= 2024 Fiji Senior League =

Fiji Senior League
- Season: 2024
- Promoted: Tavua
- Matches: 48
- Goals: 159 (3.31 per match)
- Top goalscorer: Malakay Tiwa (8 goals)
- Biggest home win: Tavua 7–0 Rakiraki; 30 June 2024
- Biggest away win: Northland Tailevu 0–6 Tavua; 11 August 2024
- Highest scoring: Dreketi 1–6 Bua; 6 April 2024; Savusavu 3–4 Taveuni; 6 April 2024; Tavua 7–0 Rakiraki; 30 June 2024

The 2024 Fiji Senior League, officially the 2024 Digicel Senior League for sponsorship reasons, is the 2024 season of the second-highest division within the Fiji football league system after the Fiji Premier League, the Fiji Senior League. It has been contested by 10 teams split into two groups of 4 and 6 teams and is run and overseen by the Fiji Football Association.

== Team changes ==
=== To Fiji Senior League ===
Relegated from 2023 Fiji Premier League

- Tavua

=== From Fiji Senior League ===
Promoted to 2024 Fiji Premier League

- Nasinu

== Teams ==
A total of ten teams compete in the league in two geographical groups of four and six teams each.

Viti Levu Zone

- Tavua
- Northland Tailevu
- Rakiraki
- Lami

Vanua Levu Zone

- Bua
- Dreketi
- Nadogo
- Seaqaqa
- Savusavu
- Taveuni
Location of the 2024 Digicel Senior League season.
Viti Levu
Vanua Levu

== League table ==
Viti Levu Zone

Pos	Team	Pld	W	D	L	GF	GA	GD	Pts	Qualification or relegation
1	Tavua (Q)	9	8	1	0	37	5	+32	25	Qualification to Play-Offs
2	Lami	9	4	2	3	19	16	+3	14	
3	Rakiraki	9	2	2	5	13	26	−13	8	
4	Northland Tailevu	9	0	3	6	7	29	−22	3	

Source: Fiji FA
(Q) Qualified for the phase indicated

Vanua Levu Zone

Pos	Team	Pld	W	D	L	GF	GA	GD	Pts	Qualification or relegation
1	Bua (Q)	10	7	1	2	24	10	+14	22	Qualification to Play-Offs
2	Seaqaqa	10	5	2	3	13	10	+3	17	
3	Savusavu	10	3	3	4	15	17	−2	12	
4	Taveuni	10	3	2	5	11	14	−3	11	
5	Nadogo	10	3	2	5	10	14	−4	11	
6	Dreketi	10	3	2	5	10	18	−8	11	

Source: Fiji FA
(Q) Qualified for the phase indicated

== Playoffs ==
The playoffs have been contested between the winners of each group, which are Bua and Tavua. Tavua won 3–1 overall and took home promotion to 2025 Fiji Premier League.

21 September 2024
1:00 PM

Bua	1–0	Tavua
Rage 81'	Report

Subrail Park, Labasa
Referee: Vignesh Prasad (Fiji)
28 September 2024
1:00 PM

Tavua	3–0	Bua
	Report

Garvey Park, Tavua
Referee: (Fiji)

== Stats ==
=== Top scorers ===
Top goalscorers during group stage.

Rank	Player	Club	Goals
1	Malakai Tiwa	Tavua	8
2	Mohammed Zaid	Bua	6
2	Kalivati Nateru	Lami	6
4	Iliesa Rokolase	Northland Tailevu	5
4	Waisea Duwai	Tavua	5

== See also ==
- 2020 Vodafone Senior League
- Fiji Senior League
- 2024 Fiji Premier League
