= 2027 Fiji Senior League =

Fiji Senior League
- Season: 2027
- Dates: TBD
- Country: Fiji
- Teams: 10
- Champions: TBD
- Runner up: TBD
- Promoted: TBD
- Relegated: TBD
- Matches: 0
- Goals: 0
- Average goals/game: 0
- Top goalscorer: TBD
- Biggest home win: TBD
- Biggest away win: TBD
- Highest scoring: TBD

The 2027 Fiji Senior League will be the 13th edition of the Fiji Senior League, the second-flight league in Fiji.

== Teams ==
=== Team Changes ===
Relegated from 2026 Fiji Premier League	Promoted to 2027 Fiji Premier League
Tailevu Naitasiri	Seaqaqa

Tailevu Naitasiri relegated back to the Senior League after just one season in the top-flight league.

Seaqaqa promoted to the Premier League for the first time in their history.

=== Teams and Stadiums ===
Team	Stadium	Capacity
Vanua Levu zone
Bua	Bua Primary School Ground	1,000
Dreketi	Waiyevo Ground	1,000
Nadogo	Nadogo Central College Ground	350
Savusavu	Ganilau Park	1,120
Taveuni	Subrail Park	10,000
Viti Levu zone
Lami	Lami Ground	3,000
Tailevu North	Dawasamu Secondary School Ground	—
Tailevu Naitasiri	Ratu Cakobau Park	8,000
Rakiraki	Ra Sports Ground	1,000
Tavua	Garvey Park	4,500

== League Tables ==
=== Vanua Levu Zone ===
Pos	Team	Pld	W	D	L	GF	GA	GD	Pts	
1	Bua	0	0	0	0	0	0	0	0	Qualification to the Promotion play-off
2	Dreketi	0	0	0	0	0	0	0	0	
3	Nadogo	0	0	0	0	0	0	0	0	
4	Savusavu	0	0	0	0	0	0	0	0	
5	Taveuni	0	0	0	0	0	0	0	0	

First match(es) will be played: February 2027. Source: Fiji Football Association

=== Viti Levu Zone ===
Pos	Team	Pld	W	D	L	GF	GA	GD	Pts	
1	Lami	0	0	0	0	0	0	0	0	Qualification to the Promotion play-off
2	Northland Tailevu	0	0	0	0	0	0	0	0	
3	Rakiraki	0	0	0	0	0	0	0	0	
4	Tailevu Naitasiri	0	0	0	0	0	0	0	0	
5	Tavua	0	0	0	0	0	0	0	0	

First match(es) will be played: February 2027. Source: Fiji Football Association

== Fixtures ==
=== Vanua Levu Zone ===
Home \ Away	BUA	DRE	NAD	SAV	TAV
Bua	—				
Dreketi		—			
Nadogo			—		
Savusavu				—	
Taveuni					—

Updated to match(es) played on unknown. Source: Fiji Football Association
Legend: Blue = home team win; Yellow = draw; Red = away team win.

=== Viti Levu Zone ===
Home \ Away	LAM	NTA	RAK	TAI	TAVU
Lami	—				
Northland Tailevu		—			
Rakiraki			—		
Tailevu Naitasiri				—	
Tavua					—

Updated to match(es) played on unknown. Source: Fiji Football Association
Legend: Blue = home team win; Yellow = draw; Red = away team win.

== Promotion Play-offs ==
TBD
TBD

TBD	v	TBD

TBD, TBD
Referee: TBD
TBD
TBD

TBD	v	TBD

TBD, TBD
Referee: TBD
