= 2025 Fiji Senior League =

- Season: 2025

The 2025 Fiji Senior League will begin play on 23 February 2025. The winners of both divisions will advance to a play-off, where the winner of that will be promoted to the Fiji Premier League.

== Team changes ==
| ▲ Promoted to 2025 Fiji Premier League | ▼ Relegated from 2024 Fiji Premier League |
|---|---|
| Tavua | Tailevu Naitasiri |

== League table ==
=== Vanua Levu ===
| Pos | Team | Pld | W | D | L | GF | GA | GD | Pts | Qualification |
|---|---|---|---|---|---|---|---|---|---|---|
| 1 | Seaqaqa (Q) | 10 | 6 | 2 | 2 | 30 | 13 | +17 | 20 | Promotion playoffs |
| 2 | Bua | 10 | 6 | 2 | 2 | 15 | 7 | +8 | 20 | |
| 3 | Nadogo | 10 | 5 | 3 | 2 | 16 | 11 | +5 | 18 | |
| 4 | Dreketi | 10 | 3 | 2 | 5 | 17 | 26 | −9 | 11 | |
| 5 | Savusavu | 10 | 3 | 1 | 6 | 16 | 18 | −2 | 10 | |
| 6 | Taveuni | 10 | 2 | 0 | 8 | 11 | 30 | −19 | 6 | |

Source: Fiji Football Association
(Q) Qualified for the phase indicated

=== Viti Levu ===
| Pos | Team | Pld | W | D | L | GF | GA | GD | Pts | Qualification |
|---|---|---|---|---|---|---|---|---|---|---|
| 1 | Tailevu Naitasiri (C, O, P) | 9 | 8 | 0 | 1 | 37 | 7 | +30 | 24 | Promotion playoffs |
| 2 | Northland Tailevu | 9 | 4 | 2 | 3 | 11 | 14 | −3 | 14 | |
| 3 | Lami | 9 | 2 | 2 | 5 | 9 | 22 | −13 | 8 | |
| 4 | Rakiraki | 9 | 1 | 2 | 6 | 12 | 26 | −14 | 5 | |

Source: FFA
(C) Champions; (O) Play-off winners; (P) Promoted

== Playoffs ==
The playoffs have been contested between the winners of each group, which are Seaqaqa and Tailevu Naitasiri. Tailevu Naitasiri won 2–0 overall and took home promotion to 2026 Fiji Premier League.

7 September 2025
1:00 PM

| Tailevu Naitasiri | 1–0 | Seaqaqa |
|---|---|---|
| | Report |

Ratu Cakobau Park, Nausori
Referee: Suraj PRAKASH

14 September 2025
1:00 PM

| Seaqaqa | 0–1 | Tailevu Naitasiri |
|---|---|---|
| | Report |

Subrail Park, Labasa
Referee: Ajnesh CHAND
