= 2020 Fiji Senior League =

- Season: 2020
- Champions: Nadroga
- Promoted: Nadroga
- Matches: 48
- Goals: 156 (3.25 per match)
- Top goalscorer: Mohammed Zaid (11 goals)
- Biggest home win: Seaqaqa 11 - 0 Taveuni; 19 September 2020
- Biggest away win: Taveuni 1 – 8 Seaqaqa; 26 July 2020
- Highest scoring: Seaqaqa 11 - 0 Taveuni; 19 September 2020

The 2020 Fiji Senior League is the second-highest division within the Fiji football league system after the Fiji Premier League in Fiji Senior League (Vodafone Senior League for sponsorship reasons). It is currently contested by 11 teams with two groups of 5 and 6 teams and is run and overseen by the Fiji Football Association.

== Teams ==
A total of eleven teams compete in the league in two groups of five and six teams each

Viti Levu Zone

- Nadroga
- Tavua
- Northland Tailevu
- Rakiraki
- Tailevu Naitasiri

Vanua Levu Zone

- Bua
- Dreketi
- Nadogo
- Seaqaqa
- Savusavu
- Taveuni

== League table ==
Viti Levu Zone

Pos	Team	Pld	W	D	L	GF	GA	GD	Pts	Qualification or relegation
1	Nadroga (Q)	8	7	1	0	18	2	+16	22	Qualification to Play-Offs
2	Tailevu Naitasiri	8	4	1	3	9	6	+3	13	
3	Rakiraki	8	3	2	3	12	13	−1	11	
4	Tavua	8	2	2	4	7	9	−2	8	
5	Northland Tailevu	8	0	2	6	4	20	−16	2	

Updated to match(es) played on 04 October 2020. Source: Fiji FA
(Q) Qualified for the phase indicated

Vanua Levu Zone

Pos	Team	Pld	W	D	L	GF	GA	GD	Pts	Qualification or relegation
1	Bua (Q)	10	8	1	1	27	13	+14	25	Qualification to Play-Offs
2	Dreketi	10	6	0	4	15	11	+4	18	
3	Seaqaqa	10	4	2	4	28	12	+16	14	
4	Nadogo	10	3	2	5	13	14	−1	11	
5	Savusavu	10	1	5	4	14	17	−3	8	
6	Taveuni	10	2	2	6	9	39	−30	8	

Updated to match(es) played on 04 October 2020. Source: Fiji FA
(Q) Qualified for the phase indicated

== Results ==
=== Viti Levu Zone ===
Home \ Away	NAD	TAN	RAK	TAV	NTA
Nadroga	—	2–0	4–0	2–1	5–0
Tailevu Naitasiri	0–1	—	0–1	2–0	2–0
Rakiraki	1–2	2–3	—	2–2	2–2
Tavua	0–0	0–2	0–0	—	4–0
Northland Tailevu	0–2	0–0	2–3	0–2	—

Updated to match(es) played on 4 October 2020. Source: Fiji FA
Legend: Blue = home team win; Yellow = draw; Red = away team win.
For upcoming matches, an "a" indicates there is an article about the rivalry between the two participants.

=== Vanua Levu Zone ===
Home \ Away	SAV	DRE	SEA	BUA	TAV	NAG
Savusavu	—	1–2	1–1	2–5	1–2	1–1
Dreketi	2–0	—	2–1	4–0	1–2	0–4
Seaqaqa	2–2	1–0	—	1–2	11–0	0–1
Bua	0–0	2–1	3–2	—	5–2	3–1
Taveuni	1–1	0–1	1–8	0–6	—	1–1
Nadogo	1–5	0–2	0–1	0–1	4–0	—

Updated to match(es) played on 4 October 2020. Source: Fiji FA
Legend: Blue = home team win; Yellow = draw; Red = away team win.
For upcoming matches, an "a" indicates there is an article about the rivalry between the two participants.

== Play-Offs ==
The play-offs will be played between the top one of each group, which will be Bua vs Nadroga, The winner is promoted to 2021 Fiji Premier League.

31 October 2020
3:00 PM

Bua	0-3	Nadroga
	Report

Subrail Park, Labasa
Referee: (Fiji)
7 November 2020
6:00 PM

Bua	0-3	Nadroga
	Report

Lawaqa Park, Sigatoka
Referee: (Fiji)

== Top scorers ==
As of match 4 October 2020

=== Top scorers ===
Rank	Player	Club	Goals
1	Mohammed Zaid	Bua	11
2	Maciu Dunadamu	Savusavu	8
3	Mohammed Ishrat	Seaqaqa	6
4	Lekima Rokosolia	Tavua	5
4	Taniela Raubula	Nadroga	5

== Awards ==
- Champion of the Day - Shafil Irsaz Ali of Nadogo

== See also ==
- 2019 Vodafone Senior League
- Fiji Senior League
- 2020 Fiji Premier League
