= List of football clubs in Fiji =

This is a list of football clubs in Fiji.

Teams are listed according to the league in which they currently play.

== Premier League (First Tier) ==
- Ba F.C.
- Labasa F.C.
- Lautoka F.C.
- Nadi F.C.
- Nadroga F.C.
- Nasinu F.C.
- Navua F.C.
- Rewa F.C.
- Suva F.C.
- Tailevu Naitasiri F.C.

== Senior League (Second Tier) ==
- Bua F.C.
- Dreketi F.C.
- Lami F.C.
- Nadogo F.C.
- Rakiraki F.C.
- Savusavu F.C.
- Seaqaqa F.C.
- Tailevu North F.C.
- Taveuni F.C.
- Tavua F.C.

== De-registered ==
- Addisbrough F.C.
- Levuka F.C.
- Nalawa F.C.
- Nokia Eagles
- Makoi F.C.
- Tovata F.C.
