= 2026 Fiji Senior League =

- Season: 2026
- Teams: 10
- Champions: Seaqaqa FC
- Runner up: Tavua FC
- Promoted: Seaqaqa FC
- Top goalscorer: Lisala Bonatoba, Ratu Dau, Sahil Ranesh, Henry Rabuka (6 goals)

The 2026 Fiji Senior League was the 2026 season of Fiji Senior League.

Seaqaqa promoted to the Fiji Premier League for the first time in their history.

== Format ==
6 Teams in the Vanua Levu zone and 4 teams in the Viti Levu zone. First place of each zone advance to play-offs and play each other. in the Vanua Levu zone, all teams play each other twice, in the Viti Levu zone, three times.

== Teams ==
Changes
Relegated From 2025 Fiji Premier League	Promoted to 2026 Fiji Premier League
Tavua FC	Tailevu Naitasiri FC

Vanua Levu - Seaqaqa FC, Dreketi FC, Savusavu FC, Nadogo FC, Taveuni FC, Bua FC.

Viti Levu - Tavua FC, Northland Tailevu FC, Lami FC, Rakiraki FC.

== Matches ==
=== Viti Levu zone ===
==== Rounds 1–6 (Home & Away) ====
Home \ Away	TAV	LAM	NOR	RAK
Tavua	—	1–0	3–1	1–1
Lami	1–2	—	2–1	2–4
Northland Tailevu	2–5	0–1	—	6–1
Rakiraki	0–1	0–5	0–2	—

Source: Fiji Football Association
Legend: Blue = home team win; Yellow = draw; Red = away team win.

==== Rounds 7–9 (Third Round) ====
Home \ Away	TAV	LAM	NOR	RAK
Tavua	—	2–1	3–0	—
Lami	—	—	—	3–2
Northland Tailevu	—	2–6	—	—
Rakiraki	1–2	—	0–0	—

Source: Fiji Football Association
Legend: Blue = home team win; Yellow = draw; Red = away team win.

=== Vanua Levu zone ===
Home \ Away	SEQ	DRE	SAV	NAD	TAVU	BUA
Seaqaqa	—	1–2	1–0	3–2	1–0	2–1
Dreketi	0–0	—	1–1	3–0	2–0	2–0
Savusavu	1–2	2–2	—	3–2	3–2	0–2
Nadogo	2–3	0–1	3–2	—	0–0	1–1
Taveuni	0–1	1–4	1–2	3–0	—	1–0
Bua	0–3	0–4	0–2	1–2	3–2	—

Source: Fiji Football Association
Legend: Blue = home team win; Yellow = draw; Red = away team win.

== League Tables ==
=== Viti Levu zone ===
Pos	Team	Pld	W	D	L	GF	GA	GD	Pts	Qualification
1	Tavua	9	8	1	0	20	7	+13	25	Qualification for promotion play-off
2	Lami	9	5	0	4	21	14	+7	15	
3	Northland Tailevu	9	2	1	6	14	22	−8	7	
4	Rakiraki	9	1	2	6	10	22	−12	5	

Source: Fiji Football Association

=== Vanua Levu zone ===
Pos	Team	Pld	W	D	L	GF	GA	GD	Pts	Qualification
1	Seaqaqa	10	8	1	1	17	8	+9	25	Qualification for promotion play-off
2	Dreketi	10	7	3	0	21	5	+16	24	
3	Savusavu	10	3	3	4	16	18	−2	12	
4	Nadogo	10	2	3	5	13	20	−7	9	
5	Taveuni	10	2	1	7	10	16	−6	7	
6	Bua	10	2	1	7	9	19	−10	7	

Source: Fiji Football Association

== Promotion Play-offs ==
29 August 2026
14:00 FJT (UTC+12:00)
Leg 1

Seaqaqa	1–1	Tavua
Bonatoba 35'	Report	Naio 51'

Bocalevu Primary School
Attendance: 600
Referee: Ajnesh Chand (Fiji)
13 September 2026
12:00 FJT (UTC+12:00)

Tavua	2–2 (a.e.t.)	Seaqaqa
Rawasoi 15'; Dau 40'	Report	Bonatoba 52'; Ishrat 65'
Penalties
(penalty scored) Sumeet Goundar; (penalty scored) Tomasi Biautubu; (penalty missed) Kartik Kumar; (penalty scored) Mosese Naba; (penalty scored) Nitin Rao; (penalty scored) Marika Rawasoi; (penalty scored) Ratu Dau; (penalty missed) Sikeli Tovilo	6-7	(penalty scored) Mohammed Ishrat; (penalty scored) Sazeem Ali; (penalty missed) Mohammed Ravusoni; (penalty scored) Roneet Chand; (penalty scored) Lisala Bonatoba; (penalty scored) Mohammed Issac; (penalty scored) Mohammed Tufeal Khan; (penalty scored) Sanil Reddy

Govind Park, Ba
Attendance: 600
Referee: Niko Ravouvou (Fiji)

Seaqaqa FC Promoted to the 2027 Fiji Premier League.

== Top goalscorers ==
Player	Team	Goals
Henry Rabuka	Dreketi FC	6
Lisala Bonatoba	Seaqaqa FC	6
Ratu Dau	Tavua FC	6
Sahil Naresh	Lami FC	6
Lote Dakui	Tavua FC	4
Asaeli Heritage	Savusavu FC	4

Note: Play-off goals Don't count.
