= 2019 Fiji Senior League =

- Season: 2019
- Champions: Navua F.C.
- Promoted: Navua F.C.
- Matches: 72
- Goals: 254 (3.53 per match)
- Top goalscorer: Taniela Rakariva (18 goals)

The 2019 Fiji Senior League was the second-highest division within the Fiji football league system after the Fiji Premier League in Fiji Senior League (Vodafone Senior League for sponsorship reasons). It is currently contested by 12 teams with two groups of 6 teams and is run and overseen by the Fiji Football Association in Fiji.

== Teams ==
A total of twelve teams compete in the league in two groups of six teams each

Viti Levu Zone

- Lami
- Nadroga
- Navua
- Northland Tailevu
- Rakiraki
- Tailevu Naitasiri

Vanua Levu Zone

- Bua
- Dreketi
- Nadogo
- Seaqaqa
- Savusavu
- Taveuni

== League table ==
Viti Levu Zone

Pos	Team	Pld	W	D	L	GF	GA	GD	Pts	Qualification or relegation
1	Navua (Q)	10	10	0	0	33	9	+24	30	Qualification to Play-Offs
2	Lami (Q)	10	6	2	2	31	11	+20	20	Qualification to Play-Offs
3	Nadroga	10	5	1	4	22	20	+2	16	
4	Tailevu Naitasiri	10	4	2	4	21	17	+4	14	
5	Northland Tailevu	10	2	0	8	15	37	−22	6	
6	Rakiraki	10	0	1	9	11	39	−28	1	

Updated to match(es) played on 01 September 2019. Source: Fiji FA
(Q) Qualified for the phase indicated

Vanua Levu Zone

Pos	Team	Pld	W	D	L	GF	GA	GD	Pts	Qualification or relegation
1	Savusavu (Q)	10	6	4	0	19	10	+9	22	Qualification to Play-Offs
2	Dreketi (Q)	10	5	3	2	18	11	+7	18	Qualification to Play-Offs
3	Seaqaqa	10	4	4	2	13	7	+6	16	
4	Bua	10	3	2	5	11	17	−6	11	
5	Taveuni	10	2	0	8	11	19	−8	6	
6	Nadogo	10	1	3	6	9	17	−8	6	

Updated to match(es) played on 01 September 2019. Source: Fiji FA
(Q) Qualified for the phase indicated

== Results ==
Viti Levu Zone

Home \ Away	NAV	LAM	NAD	TAN	NTA	RAK
Navua	—	2–1	5–0	2–0	2–1	4–1
Lami	1–3	—	2–0	0–0	4–0	8–1
Nadroga	2–3	1–2	—	1–0	3–1	6–2
Tailevu Naitasiri	2–7	0–2	2–2	—	0–1	6–3
Northland Tailevu	1–4	3–10	2–3	0–6	—	4–2
Rakiraki	0–1	1–1	1–4	0–2	0–3	—

Updated to match(es) played on 1 September 2019. Source:
Legend: Blue = home team win; Yellow = draw; Red = away team win.
For upcoming matches, an "a" indicates there is an article about the rivalry between the two participants.

Vanua Levu Zone

Home \ Away	SAV	DRE	SEA	BUA	TAV	NAG
Savusavu	—	4–1	0–0	2–2	2–1	2–1
Dreketi	0–0	—	1–2	3–0 (WO)	2–0	3–0
Seaqaqa	0–1	2–2	—	0–2	5–1	0–0
Bua	1–2	0–2	3–2	—	1–1	3–2
Taveuni	3–5	0–1	0–0	2–1	—	2–0
Nadogo	1–1	3–3	0–1	0–1	2–1	—

Updated to match(es) played on 1 September 2019. Source:
Legend: Blue = home team win; Yellow = draw; Red = away team win.
For upcoming matches, an "a" indicates there is an article about the rivalry between the two participants.

== Play-Offs ==
The play-offs are played between the top two of each group. The winner is promoted to 2020 Fiji Premier League

Pos	Team	Pld	W	D	L	GF	GA	GD	Pts	Qualification or relegation
1	Navua (C, P)	6	6	0	0	20	2	+18	18	Promoted to 2020 Fiji Premier League
2	Lami	6	3	1	2	13	9	+4	10	
3	Savusavu	6	1	2	3	4	13	−9	5	
4	Dreketi	6	0	1	5	3	16	−13	1	

Updated to match(es) played on 14 September 2019. Source: Fiji FA
(C) Champions; (P) Promoted

== Results ==
Home \ Away	NAV	LAM	SAV	DRE
Navua	—	8–0	2–0	3–0
Lami	0–1	—	6–0	6–0
Savusavu	1–3	0–0	—	2–1
Dreketi	1–3	0–1	1–1	—

Updated to match(es) played on 9 September 2019. Source:
Legend: Blue = home team win; Yellow = draw; Red = away team win.
For upcoming matches, an "a" indicates there is an article about the rivalry between the two participants.

== Top scorers ==
As of match 1 September 2019

Rank	Player	Club	Goals
1	(Fiji) Taniela Rakariva	Lami	18
2	(Fiji) Sharad Kumar	Navua	10
3	(Fiji) Vineet Chand	Navua	9

== See also ==
- 2019 Fiji Premier League
- 2019 Inter-District Championship
- 2019 Inter-District Championship - Senior Division
- 2019 Fiji Battle of the Giants
- 2019 Fiji Football Association Cup Tournament
