= 2027 Fiji Premier League =

- Season: 2027
- Dates: TBD - TBD
- Country: Fiji
- Teams: 10
- Champions: TBD
- Runner up: TBD
- Relegated: TBD
- 2028 OFC Champions League: TBD
- Matches: 0
- Goals: 0
- Average goals/game: 0
- Top goalscorer: TBD
- Biggest home win: TBD
- Biggest away win: TBD
- Highest scoring: TBD

The 2027 Fiji Premier League, known as the 2027 Extra Premier League for sponsorship reasons, is the 51st edition of the Fiji Premier League (FPL), the top-flight league of the Fiji football association.

BA FC are the reigning champions after winning their record 22nd title in 2026 as part of a historic domestic quadruple.

Seaqaqa played in the top-flight league in Fiji for the first time in their history, after beating Tavua in the promotion play-offs.

== Clubs ==
=== Team Changes ===
Promoted from the Senior League	Relegated to the Senior League
Seaqaqa FC	Tailevu Naitasiri FC

=== Clubs and stadiums ===
Team	Stadium	Capacity	Reference
Ba	Govind Park	13,500	
Labasa	Subrail Park	10,000	
Lautoka	Churchill Park	14,000	
Nadi	Prince Charles Park	18,000	
Nadroga	Lawaqa Park	12,000	
Nasinu	Nasinu Park	1,000	
Navua	Thomson Park	1,000	
Rewa	Ratu Cakobau Park	8,000	
Seaqaqa	Seaqaqa Muslim Primary School Ground	1,000	
Suva	HFC Bank Stadium	15,446	

=== Kit Sponsors ===
Team	Sponsor	Reference
Labasa	Pillays Garments	
Lautoka	Pillays Garments	
Nasinu	Pillays Garments	
Rewa	Pillays Garments	
Suva	Pillays Garments	
Ba	Pillays Garments	
Nadi	Pillays Garments	
Nadroga	Pillays Garments	
Navua	Pillays Garments	
Seaqaqa	Extra Supermarket	

== Transfers ==
Labasa has made 3 transfers, signing Miller Loloa and Gerard Avock from Vanuatu, and Chris Hatarau from Solomon Islands. They regained Christopher Wasasala and Lekima Gonerau.

Lautoka regained Sterling Vasconcellos, and also signed Afraz Ali from Nadi.

Rewa signed Semi Nabenu, and regained all 7 players: Setareki Hughes, Gabriele Matanisiga, Delon Shankar, Josaia Sela, Ivan Kumar, Asivorosi Rabo and Ratu Tevita Waranivalu.

For Navua, Jack Junior joined them from Malaita Kingz, and they regained Thomas Dunn and Filipe Baravilala.

== League table ==
Pos	Team	Pld	W	D	L	GF	GA	GD	Pts	
1	Ba	0	0	0	0	0	0	0	0	Qualification for the OFC Champions League
2	Labasa	0	0	0	0	0	0	0	0	
3	Lautoka	0	0	0	0	0	0	0	0	
4	Nadi	0	0	0	0	0	0	0	0	
5	Nasinu	0	0	0	0	0	0	0	0	
6	Nadroga	0	0	0	0	0	0	0	0	
7	Navua	0	0	0	0	0	0	0	0	
8	Rewa	0	0	0	0	0	0	0	0	
9	Suva	0	0	0	0	0	0	0	0	
10	Seaqaqa	0	0	0	0	0	0	0	0	Relegation to the Fiji Senior League

First match(es) will be played: unknown. Source: Fiji FA
Rules for classification: 1) Points; 2) Goal difference; 3) Goals scored.

== Results ==
Home \ Away	BA	LAB	REW	LAU	NAV	SUV	NAD	NAS	NDG	SQQ
Ba	—									
Labasa		—								
Rewa			—							
Lautoka				—						
Navua					—					
Suva						—				
Nadi							—			
Nasinu								—		
Nadroga									—	
Seaqaqa										—

First match(es) will be played: unknown. Source: Fiji FA
Legend: Blue = home team win; Yellow = draw; Red = away team win.
