= 2020 Fiji Premier League =

- Season: 2020
- Champions: Suva (4th title)
- Relegated: Nasinu
- OFC Champions League: Suva; Rewa
- Top goalscorer: (Fiji) Sairusi Nalaubu (9 goals)

The 2020 Fiji Premier League was the 44th season of the Fiji Premier League (Vodafone Premier League for sponsorship reasons), the top-tier football league in Fiji organized by the Fiji Football Association since its establishment in 1977. The season began on 1 February 2020.Ba are the defending champions.

== Team changes ==
=== To Fiji Premier League ===
Promoted from 2019 Vodafone Senior League

- Navua

=== From Fiji Premier League ===
Relegated to 2020 Vodafone Senior League

- Tavua

== Teams ==
A total of eight teams compete in the league.

=== Stadiums and locations ===
| Team | Location | Stadium | Capacity |
|---|---|---|---|
| Ba | Ba | Govind Park | 13,500 |
| Labasa | Labasa | Subrail Park | 10,000 |
| Lautoka | Lautoka | Churchill Park | 18,000 |
| Nadi | Nadi | Prince Charles Park | 18,000 |
| Nasinu | Nasinu | Nasinu Park | 1,000 |
| Navua | Navua | Thomson Park | 1,000 |
| Rewa | Nausori | Vodafone Ratu Cakobau Park | 8,000 |
| Suva | Suva | ANZ Stadium | 30,000 |

== Transfers ==
The first transfer window of 2020 Fijian Football season opened on January 1 and finished on January 31.

Current league champions Ba FC brought some important players like former Lautoka FC players Samuela Drudru, Beniamino Mateinaqara and Benjamin Totori. They have also signed with former Suva FC defender Laisenia Raura. Ni-Vanuatu forward Micah Tommy and Solomon Islands winger Darold Kakasi remained in the squad for 2020 season. They will also count on former New Zealand national football team head coach Ricki Herbert that signed a short-term contract with Ba FC until the end of 2020 OFC Champions League.

Lautoka FC added some important players like former Ba FC winger Shazil Ali, goalkeeper Joela Biuvania and Fiji U23 international Arami Manumanubai and Ni-Vanuatu forward Alex Saniel. They also hired Vanuatu international Jason Thomas but he is not going to play the Vodafone Premier League.

Suva FC also added some international power to their squad by bringing two Nigerian players: the defender Michael Oyesanya and the striker Jibola Afonja that played the 2019 season for Samoan side Kiwi. However they lost Solomon Islands international Gagame Feni who moved to Vanuatu to play for Galaxy.

Current Battle of the Giants, Inter-District Championship and Champion vs Champion winners Labasa FC managed to hold some key players like Siotame Kubu and Antonio Tuivuna that attracted the interest of Suva FC and Ba FC respectively. They also brought Ratu Apenisa who scored two goals in the 2020 Champion vs Champion against Ba. Solomon Islands international Dennis Ifunaoa left the team to come back to his homeland to play for Solomon Warriors.

Nadi FC will count on midfielder Avinesh Suwamy that left Ba after playing for the Men in Black for more than ten years.

Nasinu FC lost young goalkeeper Mohammed Alzaar Alam who moved to New Zealand to play for Manukau United FC. However they added some good firepower by signing with three players from Solomon Islands: Atkin Kaua, Jared Rongosulia and Marlon Nonone.

Recently promoted Navua FC added some firepower by signing with 2019 Vodafone Senior League top scorer Taniela Rakariva.

== League table ==
| Pos | Team | Pld | W | D | L | GF | GA | GD | Pts | Qualification or relegation |
|---|---|---|---|---|---|---|---|---|---|---|
| 1 | Suva (C, Q) | 14 | 7 | 6 | 1 | 24 | 12 | +12 | 27 | Qualification to OFC Champions League group stage |
| 2 | Rewa (Q) | 14 | 8 | 3 | 3 | 21 | 15 | +6 | 27 | Qualification to OFC Champions League group stage |
| 3 | Ba | 14 | 7 | 2 | 5 | 22 | 19 | +3 | 23 | |
| 4 | Nadi | 14 | 7 | 1 | 6 | 25 | 17 | +8 | 22 | |
| 5 | Labasa | 14 | 7 | 1 | 6 | 17 | 15 | +2 | 22 | |
| 6 | Lautoka | 14 | 4 | 4 | 6 | 25 | 18 | +7 | 16 | |
| 7 | Navua | 14 | 4 | 1 | 9 | 23 | 33 | −10 | 13 | |
| 8 | Nasinu (R) | 14 | 2 | 2 | 10 | 14 | 42 | −28 | 8 | Relegation to Fiji Senior League |

Updated to match(es) played on 8 November 2020. Source: Fiji FA
(C) Champions; (Q) Qualified for the phase indicated; (R) Relegated

== Results ==
| Home \ Away | BA | LAB | LAU | NAD | NAV | NAS | REW | SUV |
|---|---|---|---|---|---|---|---|---|
| Ba | — | 2–1 | 0–0 | 0–1 | 0–4 | 0–2 | 1–1 | 3–1 |
| Labasa | 2–1 | — | 2–0 | 1–0 | 0–2 | 2–0 | 1–3 | 1–2 |
| Lautoka | 1–2 | 0–0 | — | 6–0 | 2–2 | 6–0 | 3–5 | 0–1 |
| Nadi | 5–1 | 0–1 | 3–2 | — | 2–3 | 5–0 | 0–1 | 0–1 |
| Navua | 0–3 | 2–1 | 1–2 | 1–2 | — | 7–1 | 2–0 | 2–2 |
| Nasinu | 0–2 | 1–0 | 1–1 | 1–3 | 2–4 | — | 3–4 | 3–3 |
| Rewa | 0–1 | 1–2 | 1–0 | 2–1 | 3–3 | 1–0 | — | 0–0 |
| Suva | 2–1 | 3–1 | 1–1 | 0–0 | 0–2 | 5–0 | 0–0 | — |

Updated to match(es) played on 8 November 2020. Source: https://www.fijifootball.com.fj/competition-list/vodafone-premier-league-2020-536399427/
Legend: Blue = home team win; Yellow = draw; Red = away team win.
For upcoming matches, an "a" indicates there is an article about the rivalry between the two participants.

== Top scorers ==
| Rank | Player | Club | Goals |
|---|---|---|---|
| 1 | (Fiji) Sairusi Nalaubu | Suva | 9 |
| 2 | (Fiji) Rusiate Matarerega | Nadi | 8 |
| 3 | (Fiji) Ilisoni Logaivau | Labasa | 7 |
| 3 | (Fiji) Christopher Wasasala | Suva | 7 |
| 5 | (Fiji) Rusiate Matarerega | Nadi | 6 |
| 6 | (Fiji) Samuela Gavo | Lautoka | 5 |
| 6 | (Fiji) Dave Radrigai | Lautoka | 5 |
| 8 | (Fiji) Samuela Drudru | Ba | 4 |
| 8 | (Fiji) Siotame Kubu | Labasa | 4 |
| 8 | (Fiji) Sakaraia Naisua | Nadi | 4 |
| 8 | (Fiji) Ali Shazil | Lautoka | 4 |
| 8 | (Fiji) Apisai Smith | Navua | 4 |
| 8 | (Fiji) Tevita Waranaivalu | Rewa | 4 |

== See also ==
- 2020 Vodafone Senior League
- 2020 Inter-District Championship
- 2020 Inter-District Championship - Senior Division
- 2020 Fiji Battle of the Giants
- 2020 Fiji Football Association Cup Tournament
