= 2026 Fiji Premier League =

Fiji Premier League
- Season: 2026
- Dates: 21 February – 29 August 2026
- Champions: Ba
- Relegated: Tailevu Naitasiri
- Matches: 90
- Goals: 330 (3.67 per match)
- Biggest home win: Suva 8–0 Tailevu Naitasiri (26 April)
- Biggest away win: Tailevu Naitasiri 0–9 Ba (10 May)
- Highest scoring: Tailevu Naitasiri 0–9 Ba (10 May); Tailevu Naitasiri 2–7 Navua (2 August)

The 2026 Fiji Premier League, known as the 2026 Extra Premier League for sponsorship reasons, was the 50th edition of the Fiji Premier League (FPL), the top-level association football league for Fiji.

Rewa FC were the reigning champions, having won their third league title in 2025.

Ba FC won the title, winning their 22nd title and their first since 2019 as part of a historic domestic quadruple, the first in Fijian history.

Tailevu Naitasiri were relegated back to the Fiji Senior League (FSL) after just one season in the top flight.

== Team changes ==
▲ Promoted from the Senior League	▼ Relegated to the Senior League
Tailevu Naitasiri	Tavua

== League table ==
Pos	Team	Pld	W	D	L	GF	GA	GD	Pts	Qualification
1	Ba (C, Q)	18	13	3	2	54	14	+40	42	Qualification for the OFC Men's Champions League
2	Labasa	18	11	5	2	44	21	+23	38	
3	Rewa	18	10	2	6	39	17	+22	32	
4	Lautoka	18	7	5	6	37	35	+2	26	
5	Navua	18	7	4	7	25	23	+2	25	
6	Suva	18	6	5	7	37	28	+9	23	
7	Nadi	18	6	3	9	25	29	−4	21	
8	Nasinu	18	6	3	9	27	42	−15	21	
9	Nadroga	18	3	4	11	22	49	−27	13	
10	Tailevu Naitasiri (R)	18	2	4	12	20	72	−52	10	Relegation to the Fiji Senior League

Source: RSSSF
(C) Champions; (Q) Qualified for the phase indicated; (R) Relegated

== Results ==
Home \ Away	BA	LAB	LAU	NAD	NAR	NAS	NAV	REW	SUV	TAI
Ba		1–2	4–1	1–1	5–2	7–0	1–0	2–3	2–1	6–0
Labasa	1–2		5–3	3–1	3–1	0–0	5–2	2–1	2–2	0–0
Lautoka	1–1	1–2		2–1	3–1	1–2	1–1	0–4	1–1	5–1
Nadi	1–1	2–3	1–2		3–2	1–2	1–0	1–1	2–1	4–0
Nadroga	0–3	0–5	2–3	2–1		1–0	0–1	0–0	4–1	2–2
Nasinu	0–4	2–2	1–5	2–3	2–1		0–2	2–5	3–1	4–2
Navua	0–2	0–1	2–1	0–1	1–1	1–1		1–0	2–2	4–1
Rewa	0–1	2–1	2–3	4–1	6–0	2–1	0–1		4–0	1–0
Suva	1–2	0–0	1–1	2–0	7–0	3–2	3–0	1–0		8–0
Tailevu Naitasiri	0–9	1–7	3–3	1–0	3–3	1–3	2–7	0–4	3–2	

Updated to match(es) played on 29 August 2026. Source: RSSSF
Legend: Blue = home team win; Yellow = draw; Red = away team win.
For upcoming matches, an "a" indicates there is an article about the rivalry between the two participants.
