= 2024 Fiji Premier League =

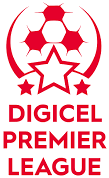
- Season: 2024
- Dates: 18 February – 29 September
- Champions: Rewa FC (2nd title)
- Relegated: Tailevu Naitasiri FC
- OFC Champions League: Rewa FC; Labasa FC
- Matches played: 90
- Goals scored: 310 (3.44 per match)
- Top goalscorer: Merrill Nand (11)
- Biggest home win: Rewa 6–1 Nadroga (14 April 2024); Suva 5–0 Tailevu Naitasiri (11 August 2024)
- Biggest away win: Tailevu Naitasiri 1–5 Rewa (3 March 2024); Nasinu 0–4 Rewa (11 August 2024)
- Highest scoring: Navua 6–2 Lautoka (7 July 2024)

The 2024 Fiji Premier League, known as the 2024 Digicel Premier League for sponsorship reasons, has been the 48th season of the Fiji Premier League, the highest level of the Fijian football league system. The season begun on 18 February and ended on 29 September.

Lautoka FC were the defending champions. On 22 September 2024, Rewa won their second title with a game to spare.

== Teams ==
Newly promoted Nasinu FC replaced 2023 Fiji Premier League's last placed Tavua FC.

▲ Promoted from 2023 Fiji Senior League	▼ Relegated to 2024 Fiji Senior League
Nasinu	Tavua

Location of teams in the 2024 Fiji Premier League

Club	Location	Stadium
Ba	Ba	Govind Park
Labasa	Labasa	Subrail Park
Lautoka	Lautoka	Churchill Park
Nadi	Nadi	Prince Charles Park
Nadroga	Sigatoka	Lawaqa Park
Nasinu	Nasinu	Nasinu Park
Navua	Navua	Thomson Park
Rewa	Nausori	Ratu Cakobau Park
Suva	Suva	HFC Bank Stadium
Tailevu	Nausori	Ratu Cakobau Park

== League table ==
Pos	Team	Pld	W	D	L	GF	GA	GD	Pts	Qualification or relegation
1	Rewa (C)	18	13	4	1	43	14	+29	43	Qualification to Champions League group stage
2	Labasa	18	9	5	4	29	23	+6	32	
3	Lautoka	18	10	1	7	45	37	+8	31	
4	Navua	18	8	5	5	31	23	+8	29	
5	Ba	18	8	4	6	31	26	+5	28	
6	Nadi	18	7	4	7	32	33	−1	25	
7	Suva	18	6	4	8	33	35	−2	22	
8	Nadroga	18	5	2	11	29	43	−14	17	
9	Nasinu	18	5	0	13	20	40	−20	15	
10	Tailevu Naitasiri (R)	18	3	3	12	17	36	−19	12	Relegation to Fiji Senior League

Source: Fiji FA RSSSF
(C) Champions; (R) Relegated

== Results ==
Home \ Away	BA	LAB	LAU	NAD	NDR	NAS	NAV	REW	SUV	TAI
Ba	—	2–1	3–1	1–0	4–2	0–1	0–2	1–3	5–2	1–1
Labasa	3–3	—	2–1	1–0	2–1	2–0	0–1	1–0	1–0	1–1
Lautoka	4–2	4–2	—	5–1	3–2	4–0	1–1	2–3	0–1	2–1
Nadi	0–2	1–1	2–3	—	3–3	4–2	2–2	1–4	1–2	3–1
Nadroga	1–0	2–2	4–3	0–1	—	1–2	1–0	0–3	5–2	4–1
Nasinu	0–2	1–3	2–4	1–4	3–1	—	3–1	0–4	1–2	0–1
Navua	2–2	2–3	6–2	1–2	2–1	1–0	—	0–1	2–2	1–0
Rewa	2–1	2–1	2–0	1–1	6–1	3–1	0–0	—	1–1	1–0
Suva	0–1	1–1	2–4	1–2	4–0	3–2	2–5	2–2	—	5–0
Tailevu	1–1	1–2	1–2	2–4	2–0	0–1	1–2	1–5	2–1	—

Source: https://www.fijifootball.com.fj/competition-list/digicel-fiji-premier-league-2024-2700296629
Legend: Blue = home team win; Yellow = draw; Red = away team win.
For upcoming matches, an "a" indicates there is an article about the rivalry between the two participants.

== Season statistics ==
=== Top goalscorers ===
Rank	Player	Club	Goals
1	(Fiji) Merrill Nand	Suva	11
2	(Fiji) Christopher Wasasala	Labasa	9
2	(Fiji) Sairusi Nalaubu	Lautoka	9
2	(Fiji) Tevita Waranaivalu	Rewa	9
5	(Solomon Islands) Ali Mekawir	Navua	8
5	(Fiji) Iosefo Verevou	Rewa	8
5	(Fiji) Etonia Dogalau	Ba	8
5	(Fiji) Rusiate Matarerega	Nadroga	8
9	(Fiji) Simione Damuni	Navua	6
9	(Vanuatu) Joe Moses	Suva	6
9	(Fiji) Saula Waqa	Lautoka	6

=== Hat-tricks ===
Player	For	Against	Score	Date
(Solomon Islands) Junior Rocky	Nadi	Nadroga	3-3	10 March 2024
(Fiji) Simione Damuni	Navua	Lautoka	6-2	7 July 2024
(Fiji) Merrill Nand	Suva	Tailevu Naitasiri	5-0	11 August 2024
(Fiji) Sairusi Nalaubu	Lautoka	Nadi	2-3	17 August 2024
