= 2023 Fiji Premier League =

2023 season of the Fiji Premier League

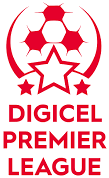
- Digicel Premier League logo
- Season: 2023
- Champions: Lautoka (7th title)
- Relegated: Tavua
- OFC Champions League: Lautoka; Rewa
- Matches played: 18
- Top goalscorer: Sairusi Nalaubu (19)
- Biggest home win: Lautoka 8–0 Nadroga (30 June 2023)
- Biggest away win: Nadi 1–5 Lautoka (5 March 2023); Nadroga 0–4 Navua (30 April 2023)
- Highest scoring: Lautoka 8–0 Nadroga (30 June 2023)

The 2023 Fiji Premier League, also known as the 2023 Digicel Premier League for sponsorship reasons, was the 47th season of the Fiji Premier League, the highest level of the Fijian football league system. The season began on 25 February and ended on 24 September.

Lautoka won their seventh title, while defending champions Rewa finished second. Tavua finished last and were relegated back to the Senior League after just one season, where they will compete in the 2024 Fiji Senior League.

The season's top scorer was Sairusi Nalaubu, a striker for Lautoka who scored 19 goals. Nalaubu received the Golden Boot award from the Fiji Football Association.

== Teams ==
=== League changes ===
Nasinu FC were relegated from the 2022 Fiji Premier League and were replaced by Tavua FC.

Location of teams in the 2023 Fiji Premier League

=== Team list ===
Club	Location	Stadium
Ba	Ba	Govind Park
Labasa	Labasa	Subrail Park
Lautoka	Lautoka	Churchill Park
Nadi	Nadi	Prince Charles Park
Nadroga	Sigatoka	Lawaqa Park
Navua	Navua	Thomson Park
Rewa	Nausori	Ratu Cakobau Park
Suva	Suva	HFC Bank Stadium
Tailevu	Nausori	Ratu Cakobau Park
Tavua	Tavua	Garvey Park

== League table ==
Pos	Team	Pld	W	D	L	GF	GA	GD	Pts	Qualification or relegation
1	Lautoka (C, Q)	18	12	4	2	50	21	+29	40	Qualification to OFC Champions League national play-offs
2	Rewa (Q)	18	9	6	3	31	16	+15	33	Qualification to OFC Champions League national play-offs
3	Suva	18	8	5	5	32	21	+11	29	
4	Labasa	18	7	7	4	17	11	+6	28	
5	Ba	18	6	7	5	21	18	+3	25	
6	Nadi	18	7	3	8	27	34	−7	24	
7	Tailevu	18	7	3	8	21	29	−8	24	
8	Navua	18	5	5	8	24	28	−4	20	
9	Nadroga	18	4	1	13	18	46	−28	13	
10	Tavua (R)	18	1	7	10	21	38	−17	10	Relegation to Fiji Senior League

Updated to match(es) played on 23 September 2023. Source: Fiji FA
(C) Champions; (Q) Qualified for the phase indicated; (R) Relegated

== Results ==
Home \ Away	BA	LAB	LAU	NAD	NDR	NAV	REW	SUV	TAI	TAV
Ba	—	0–0	0–0	2–2	2–0	0–0	1–1	1–2	2–2	3–2
Labasa	3–0	—	0–3	0–1	3–0	0–1	1–0	0–0	1–1	1–1
Lautoka	1–1	1–0	—	6–1	8–0	4–3	1–1	3–0	3–1	5–2
Nadi	0–2	0–2	1–5	—	2–0	1–0	2–3	1–2	3–0	2–2
Nadroga	0–1	2–2	3–4	1–3	—	0–4	1–3	2–1	2–1	3–2
Navua	2–1	0–1	2–1	1–2	2–1	—	1–1	1–4	0–1	1–1
Rewa	1–0	0–0	4–1	0–0	4–1	1–1	—	0–1	1–2	2–3
Suva	1–2	0–0	1–2	4–1	2–0	4–1	1–2	—	4–0	2–2
Tailevu	1–0	1–2	0–1	2–0	2–1	3–2	0–2	2–2	—	1–0
Tavua	0–3	0–1	1–1	2–5	0–1	2–2	0–2	1–1	0–2	—

Updated to match(es) played on 23 September 2023. Source: https://www.fijifootball.com.fj/competition-list/digicel-premier-league-2023-2543785917/
Legend: Blue = home team win; Yellow = draw; Red = away team win.
For upcoming matches, an "a" indicates there is an article about the rivalry between the two participants.

== Season statistics ==
Rank	Player	Club	Goals
1	(Fiji) Sairusi Nalaubu	Lautoka	19
2	(Fiji) Etonia Dogalau	Ba	7
3	(Vanuatu) Alex Saniel	Suva	6
3	(Vanuatu) Aporosa Yada	Lautoka	6
3	(Fiji) Samuela Drudru	Suva	6
4	(Fiji) Mosese Nabose	Tailevu	5
4	(Fiji) Rusiate Matarerega	Nadi	5
4	(Fiji) Zibraaz Sahib	Lautoka	5
