= 2025 Fiji Premier League =

Fiji Premier League
- Season: 2025
- Dates: 22 February – 21 September 2025
- Champions: Rewa; 3rd title
- Relegated: Tavua
- Champions League: Rewa
- Matches: 90
- Goals: 315 (3.5 per match)
- Top goalscorer: John Orobulu (19)
- Biggest home win: Labasa 6–0 Tavua (1 March)
- Biggest away win: Tavua 0–3 Nadi (22 February)
- Highest scoring: Labasa 6–0 Tavua (1 March)

The 2025 Fiji Premier League, known as the 2025 Extra Premier League for sponsorship reasons, was the 49th edition of the Fiji Premier League, the top-level association football league for Fiji.

Rewa FC were the reigning champions. They successfully defended their title, winning their third league title and their second in a row.

== Teams ==
Location of teams in the 2025 Fiji Premier League

=== Team changes ===
▲ Promoted from the Senior League	▼ Relegated to the Senior League
Tavua	Tailevu Naitasiri

=== List ===
Club	Location	Stadium
Ba	Ba	Govind Park
Labasa	Labasa	Subrail Park
Lautoka	Lautoka	Churchill Park
Nadi	Nadi	Prince Charles Park
Nadroga	Sigatoka	Lawaqa Park
Nasinu	Nasinu	Nasinu Park
Navua	Navua	Thomson Park
Rewa	Nausori	Ratu Cakobau Park
Suva	Suva	HFC Bank Stadium
Tailevu	Nausori	Ratu Cakobau Park
Tavua	Tavua	Garvey Park

== League table ==
Pos	Team	Pld	W	D	L	GF	GA	GD	Pts	Qualification
1	Rewa (C, Q)	18	13	4	1	51	13	+38	43	Qualification for the OFC Men's Champions League
2	Labasa	18	11	4	3	45	24	+21	37	
3	Lautoka	18	11	1	6	30	23	+7	34	
4	Ba	18	7	6	5	41	23	+18	27	
5	Navua	18	8	2	8	22	25	−3	26	
6	Suva	18	5	8	5	29	24	+5	23	
7	Nadi	18	5	5	8	31	35	−4	20	
8	Nadroga	18	5	4	9	26	41	−15	19	
9	Nasinu	18	5	3	10	28	56	−28	18	
10	Tavua (R)	18	0	3	15	12	51	−39	3	Relegation to the Fiji Senior League

Source: Fiji Football Association
(C) Champions; (Q) Qualified for the phase indicated; (R) Relegated

== Results ==
Home \ Away	BA	LAB	LAU	NAD	NAR	NAS	NAV	REW	SUV	TAV
Ba	—		3–0		2–2				1–1	
Labasa	2–1	—						1–2		6–0
Lautoka		1–4	—			2–0	0–1	1–3		
Nadi		0–1		—		3–3			2–3	
Nadroga					—	4–1	1–3			
Nasinu	3–2		2–0			—			2–7	
Navua		2–3		2–0		1–0	—			3–0
Rewa		1–1						—		
Suva	1–1				2–3			2–3	—	
Tavua			1–2	0–3	1–3				1–1	—

Updated to match(es) played on 6 July 2025. Source: Fiji Football Association
Legend: Blue = home team win; Yellow = draw; Red = away team win.
For upcoming matches, an "a" indicates there is an article about the rivalry between the two participants.

== Statistics ==
As of 14 March 2025

=== Top goalscorers ===
Rank	Player	Club	Goals
1	(Solomon Islands) Jimson Abana	Labasa	5
2	(Fiji) France Catarogo	Ba	3
3	(Fiji) Rusiate Doidoi	Labasa	2
3	(Fiji) Rusiate Matarerega	Nadi	2
3	(Fiji) Ronish Singh	Nasinu	2
6	27 players		1

=== Hat-tricks ===
Player	For	Against	Score	Date
(Solomon Islands) Jimson Abana	Labasa	Tavua	6–0	1 March
