= 2019 Fiji Premier League =

- Season: 2019
- Champions: Ba F.C. (21st title)
- Relegated: Tavua F.C.
- OFC Champions League: Ba F.C. Lautoka F.C.
- Matches: 56
- Goals: 154 (2.75 per match)
- Top goalscorer: Samuela Drudru (12 goals)
- Biggest home win: Lautoka 6x0 Tavua
- Highest scoring: Lautoka 6x0 Tavua

The 2019 Fiji Premier League was the 43rd season of the Fiji Premier League (Vodafone Premier League for sponsorship reasons), the top-tier football league in Fiji organized by the Fiji Football Association since its establishment in 1977. It started on 19 January 2019. Lautoka were the defending champions.

== Team changes ==
=== To Fiji Premier League ===
Promoted from 2018 Vodafone Senior League

- Nasinu

=== From Fiji Premier League ===
Relegated to 2019 Vodafone Senior League

- Dreketi

== Teams ==
A total of eight teams compete in the league.

=== Stadiums and locations ===
| Team | Location | Stadium | Capacity |
|---|---|---|---|
| Ba | Ba | Govind Park | 13,500 |
| Labasa | Labasa | Subrail Park | 10,000 |
| Lautoka | Lautoka | Churchill Park | 18,000 |
| Nadi | Nadi | Prince Charles Park | 18,000 |
| Nasinu | Nasinu | Nasinu Park | 1,000 |
| Rewa | Nausori | Vodafone Ratu Cakobau Park | 8,000 |
| Suva | Suva | ANZ Stadium | 30,000 |
| Tavua | Tavua | Garvey Park | 4,500 |

== League table ==
| Pos | Team | Pld | W | D | L | GF | GA | GD | Pts | Qualification or relegation |
|---|---|---|---|---|---|---|---|---|---|---|
| 1 | Ba (C, Q) | 14 | 11 | 3 | 0 | 29 | 5 | +24 | 36 | Qualification to OFC Champions League group stage |
| 2 | Lautoka (Q) | 14 | 9 | 1 | 4 | 34 | 19 | +15 | 28 | Qualification to OFC Champions League group stage |
| 3 | Suva | 14 | 7 | 2 | 5 | 22 | 17 | +5 | 23 | |
| 4 | Labasa | 14 | 6 | 4 | 4 | 18 | 19 | −1 | 22 | |
| 5 | Nadi | 14 | 5 | 0 | 9 | 25 | 27 | −2 | 15 | |
| 6 | Nasinu | 14 | 4 | 1 | 9 | 20 | 22 | −2 | 13 | |
| 7 | Rewa | 14 | 3 | 3 | 8 | 9 | 25 | −16 | 12 | |
| 8 | Tavua (R) | 14 | 4 | 0 | 10 | 9 | 32 | −23 | 12 | Relegation to Fiji Senior League |

Source: Fiji FA
(C) Champions; (Q) Qualified for the phase indicated; (R) Relegated

== Results ==
| Home \ Away | BAF | LAB | LAU | NAD | NAS | REW | SUV | TAV |
|---|---|---|---|---|---|---|---|---|
| Ba | — | 3–0 | 3–0 | 3–0 | 1–1 | 1–1 | 3–1 | 3–0 |
| Labasa | 1–1 | — | 1–4 | 4–2 | 1–0 | 1–1 | 1–1 | 1–2 |
| Lautoka | 1–4 | 0–0 | — | 2–0 | 4–3 | 4–1 | 0–1 | 6–0 |
| Nadi | 0–1 | 2–3 | 1–2 | — | 1–2 | 6–1 | 1–3 | 1–0 |
| Nasinu | 0–1 | 2–0 | 1–4 | 1–2 | — | 0–1 | 2–3 | 5–0 |
| Rewa | 0–2 | 0–1 | 1–2 | 0–4 | 1–0 | — | 1–0 | 0–1 |
| Suva | 0–1 | 1–2 | 2–1 | 4–3 | 2–0 | 1–1 | — | 3–0 |
| Tavua | 0–2 | 0–2 | 1–4 | 1–2 | 1–3 | 2–0 | 1–0 | — |

Updated to match(es) played on 1 September 2019. Source: https://www.fijifootball.com.fj/competition-list/vodafone-premier-league-2019-8016159/
Legend: Blue = home team win; Yellow = draw; Red = away team win.
For upcoming matches, an "a" indicates there is an article about the rivalry between the two participants.

== Top scorers ==
As of match 1 September 2019

| Rank | Player | Club | Goals |
|---|---|---|---|
| 1 | (Fiji) Samuela Drudru | Lautoka | 12 |
| 2 | (Fiji) Rusiate Matarerega | Nadi | 11 |
| 3 | (Fiji) Avinesh Suwamy | Ba | 7 |
| 4 | (Fiji) Siotame Kubu | Labasa | 6 |
| 5 | (Fiji) Meli Codro | Suva | 4 |
| 5 | (Fiji) Tito Vodowaqa | Nadi | 4 |
| 5 | (Solomon Islands) Benjamin Totori | Lautoka | 4 |
| 5 | (Fiji) Manasa Levaci | Nasinu | 4 |
| 5 | (Fiji) Sanaila Waqanicakau | Ba | 4 |

== See also ==
- 2019 Vodafone Senior League
- 2019 Inter-District Championship
- 2019 Inter-District Championship - Senior Division
- 2019 Fiji Battle of the Giants
- 2019 Fiji Football Association Cup Tournament
