= Fiji Senior League =

- Region: Fiji
- Confederation: OFC (Oceania)
- Level on pyramid: 2
- Promotion to: Fiji Premier League
- Current: 2026 Fiji Senior League

The Fiji Senior League, or the Digicel Senior League for sponsorship reasons, is the second-highest division within the Fijian football league system after the Fiji Premier League. It is contested by ten teams with two groups, one of six teams and the other of four teams. The league is run and overseen by the Fiji Football Association in Fiji.

The champions of the Fiji Senior League are promoted to the Premier League with the other promotion coming from the play-offs. The league starts in February / March. The senior league is popular to "blood" the Fiji youth players to prepare them for professional football.

== Current clubs ==
Location of the 2024 Digicel Senior League season.
Viti Levu
Vanua Levu

=== Viti Levu Zone ===
- Lami F.C.
- Rakiraki F.C.
- Tailevu Naitasiri F.C.
- Tailevu North F.C.

=== Vanua Levu Zone ===
- Bua FC
- Dreketi FC
- Nadogo FC
- Seaqaqa FC
- Savusavu FC
- Taveuni FC

== Previous winners ==
=== Viti Levu Zone ===
- 2014: Tailevu Naitasiri F.C. - Promoted to 2015 Fiji Premier League
- 2016: Rakiraki F.C. - Promoted to 2017 Fiji Premier League
- 2017: Tavua F.C. - Promoted to 2018 Fiji Premier League
- 2018: Nasinu F.C. - Promoted to 2019 Fiji Premier League
- 2019: Navua F.C. - Promoted to 2020 Fiji Premier League
- 2020: Nadroga F.C. - Promoted to 2021 Fiji Premier League
- 2022: Tavua F.C. - Promoted to 2023 Fiji Premier League
- 2023: Nasinu F.C. - Promoted to 2024 Fiji Premier League
- 2024: Tavua F.C. - Promoted to 2024 Fiji Premier League
- 2025: Tailevu Naitasiri F.C - Promoted to 2026 Fiji Premier League
- 2026: Tavua F.C

=== Vanua Levu Zone ===
- 2015: Dreketi F.C. - Promoted to 2016 Fiji Premier League
- 2016: Bua F.C.
- 2017: Seaqaqa F.C.
- 2019: Savusavu F.C.
- 2020: Bua F.C.
- 2022: Seaqaqa F.C.
- 2023: Savusavu F.C.
- 2024: Bua F.C.
- 2025: Seaqaqa F.C
- 2026: Seaqaqa F.C - Promoted to 2027 Fiji Premier League
