= 2027 in Fijian football =

Football in Fiji
- Season: 2027

The 2027 season will be the 103rd competitive association football season in Fiji.

== Men's football ==
=== Fiji Premier League ===
The 2027 Fiji Premier League will consist of ten teams.

=== Fiji Senior League ===
The 2027 Fiji Senior League will consist of ten teams.

=== Champion versus Champion ===
The 2027 Champion versus Champion will be contested between Ba and Navua.
