= Sterling Vasconcellos =

Fijian footballer (born 2005)

Personal information
- Full name: Sterling Maikeli Mociu Vasconcellos
- Date of birth: 19 April 2005 (age 21)
- Place of birth: Fiji
- Position: Defender

Team information
- Current team: Bula FC

Youth career
- Lautoka

Senior career*
Years	Team	Apps	(Gls)
2022–2025	Lautoka	23	(0)
2025	Eastern Suburbs	16	(0)
2026–	Bula FC	9	(0)

International career^{‡}
2022–2024	Fiji U20	14	(2)
2023	Fiji U23	4	(0)
2023–	Fiji	24	(1)
Medal record
Men's football
Representing Fiji
OFC U-19 Championship
Runner-up	2022 Tahiti
Pacific Games
Bronze medal – third place	2023 Solomon Islands
MSG Prime Minister's Cup
Winner	2026 Fiji
Runner-up	2024 Solomon Islands
- * Club domestic league appearances and goals as of 22:17, 11 March 2026 (UTC) ‡ National team caps and goals as of 13:51, 11 February 2026 (UTC)

Sterling Maikeli Mociu Vasconcellos (born 19 April 2005) is a Fijian footballer who plays as a defender for OFC Professional League Bula FC and the Fiji national team.

== Club career ==
=== Lautoka ===
Vasconcellos started his career with Fijian side Lautoka where he represented the youth teams from U10 to U19 level. He won the Fiji Premier League in 2023 and the Fiji FA Cup Tournament in 2023 and 2024 with Lautoka.

He was awarded the 2024 Digicel Pacific FACT Best Player of the Tournament. He was also awarded the 2024 Digicel Pacific FACT Golden Boot. He received interest from New Zealand clubs.

=== Eastern Suburbs ===
On 5 February 2025, Eastern Suburbs announced Vasconcellos had signed alongside fellow Fijian Thomas Dunn, for the 2025 season.

=== Bula FC ===
On 8 December 2025, Vasconcellos signed for OFC Professional League club Bula FC on a one-year deal valid for the 2026 season; he signed again alongside Thomas Dunn.

== International career ==
=== Youth ===
He represented Fiji U20 at the 2023 FIFA U-20 World Cup, and he scored two goals for Fiji U20 against Vanuatu U20 during the 6–1 victory at the 2019 OFC U-19 Men's Championship. He also represented Fiji U23 during the 2023 OFC Men's Olympic Qualifying Tournament.

=== Senior ===
He made his senior debut for Fiji on 18 November 2023 during the 10–0 victory against Northern Mariana Islands during the 2023 Pacific Games, and he represented Fiji during the 2024 OFC Men's Nations Cup.

He scored his first goal for Fiji on 15 November 2025 during the 1–0 victory against Papua New Guinea Red at the 2025 MSG Prime Minister's Cup.

== Personal life ==
Vasconcellos was born on 19 April 2005 in Fiji and he grew up in Lautoka. His family supported him in his football career. He is of American descent and he obtained an American passport; his father is a native of Hawaii, United States while his mother is a native of Nadi, Fiji.

He attended Dreketi Sangam School in Fiji, where he started playing football. After that, he attended Tilak High School in Fiji.

== Career statistics ==
=== Club ===
As of match played 3 March 2026

Appearances and goals by club, season and competition (incomplete)
Club	Season	League			National cup (Note: Includes Fiji FA Cup Tournament, Chatham Cup)		Other	
Club	Season	Division	Apps	Goals	Apps	Goals	Apps	Goals
Lautoka	2022	Fiji Premier League	4	0	5	0	3 (Note: Three appearances in the Battle of the Giants)	0
Lautoka	2023	Fiji Premier League	6	0	5	0		
Lautoka	2024	Fiji Premier League	13	0	5	0		
Eastern Suburbs	2025	New Zealand National League	16	0	1	0		
Bula FC	2026	OFC Professional League	9	0	—		—	
Career total			48	0	16	0	3	0

=== International ===
As of match played 20 November 2025

Appearances and goals by national team and year
National team	Year	Apps	Goals
Fiji	2023	4	0
Fiji	2024	15	0
Fiji	2025	5	1
Total		24	1

Scores and results list Fiji's goal tally first, score column indicates score after each Vasconcellos goal.

List of international goals scored by Sterling Vasconcellos
No.	Date	Venue	Opponent	Score	Result	Competition
1.	15 November 2025	Sir John Guise Stadium, Port Moresby, Papua New Guinea	Papua New Guinea	1–0	1–0	2025 MSG Prime Minister's Cup
2.	27 September 2026	HFC Bank Stadium, Suva, Fiji	Papua New Guinea	2–0	2–0	2026 MSG Prime Minister's Cup

== Honours ==
Lautoka

- Fiji Premier League: 2023
- Fiji FA Cup Tournament: 2023, 2024
- Battle of the Giants (Fiji): 2024
- Champion versus Champion Series: 2024

Fiji

- Pacific Games: Bronze Medalist, 2023
- MSG Prime Minister's Cup: 2026; Runner-up, 2024

Fiji U23

- OFC Men's Olympic Qualifying Tournament: Runner-up, 2023

Fiji U20

- OFC U-19 Championship: Runner-up, 2019

Individual

- OFC Professional League Team of the Season: 2026 (substitute)
