= Inter-District Championship =

Football Tournament In Fiji

FMF Inter District Championship
- Organiser(s): Oceania Football Confederation
- Region: Oceania
- Current champions: Rewa F.C. (10th title)
- Most championships: Ba F.C. (26 titles)
- Broadcaster: MAI TV
- 2025 Interdistrict Championship

The FMF Inter-District Championship (IDC) is the amateur Fijian football cup. Only five teams (Suva, Rewa, Ba, Levuka and Lautoka) first took part in the first IDC held in Suva in 1938. From 1938 to 1975, the competition was initially held on a knock out format but in 1976 pool play was introduced. From 1985, the competition was held in two divisions with the introduction of a second level tournament known as the Premier Division. In 1999 there was a short lived third level division. With Navua registering its first ever win of the IDC tournament in 2009, all the current (as of January 2010) Super Premium Division teams have now won the Lloyd Farebrother Trophy one or more time(s).

== Nature of tournament ==
The tournament is divided into two divisions. The Premier division (previously 10 teams) is currently made up of 8 district teams. At present these teams are Ba, Labasa, Lautoka, Nadi, Nadroga, Rewa, Suva, and Tailevu/Naitasiri. The teams are divided into two pools of four and each team plays all the other teams once, usually over four days. A win is worth 3 points, a draw 1 point and a loss 0 points. The top two teams in each pool qualify for the semi-finals, with the winner of each pool playing the runner-up of the other pool. The semi-finals and the final are played on the same day.

The First division is made up of 14 teams. At present these teams are Bua, Dreketi, Lami, Nadogo, Nalawa, Nasinu, Navua, Rakiraki, Seaqaqa, Savusavu, Tavua, Tailevu North, Taveuni and Vatukoula. The teams are divided into three pools of four and each team plays all the other teams once, over four days. A win is worth 3 points, a draw 1 point and a loss 0 points. The top team in each pool plus the best runner-up qualify for the semi-finals. The semi-finals and the final are played on the same day.

== Inter-District Competition Roll of Champions ==
Year	Venue	Winner	Runner-up	Score
1938	Suva	Rewa	Ba	3 - 2
1939	Lautoka	Rewa	Suva	3 - 2
1940	Rewa	Suva	Rewa	2 – 1
1941	Ba	Lautoka	Ba	2 – 1
1942	Nadi	Lautoka	Suva	3 - 0
1943	Levuka	Rewa	Suva	4 - 2
1944	Rakiraki	Rewa	Suva	2 – 1
1945	Lautoka	Suva	Lautoka	3 – 1
1946	Rewa	Suva	Ba	1 - 0
1947	Ba	Rewa	Ba	4 – 1
1948	Rewa	Suva	Rewa	4 - 2
1949	Lautoka	Lautoka	Rewa	4 - 2
1950	Rewa	Lautoka	Nadi	3 – 1
1951	Ba	Suva	Rakiraki	2 - 0
1952	Suva	Suva	Nadi	2 – 1
1953	Lautoka	Lautoka	Nadi	2 – 1
1954	Rewa	Suva	Nadi	1 - 0
1955	Ba	Rewa	Lautoka	3 - 2
1956	Suva	Suva	Lautoka	3 - 2
1957	Lautoka	Lautoka	Ba	7 – 1
1958	Suva	Lautoka	Suva	2 – 1
1959	Ba	Lautoka	Ba	6 - 0
1960	Rewa	Suva	Nadi	2 – 1
1961	Nadi	Ba	Nadi	2 – 1
1962	Lautoka	Lautoka	Ba	7 - 0
1963	Suva	Ba	Suva	2 - 0
1964	Ba	Lautoka	Ba	6 – 1
1965	Nadi	Lautoka	Suva	2 – 1
1966	Suva	Ba	Suva	5 - 0
1967	Lautoka	Ba	Lautoka	1 - 0
1968	Ba	Ba	Lautoka	3 - 2
1969	Labasa	Nadi	Suva	1 - 0
1970	Rewa	Ba	Suva	2 – 1
1971	Nadi	Nadi	Suva	5 - 4
1972	Suva	Rewa	Labasa	10 - 9
1973	Lautoka	Lautoka	Labasa	1 - 0
1974	Nadi	Nadi	T/Naitasiri	1 - 0
1975	Labasa	Ba	Suva	1 - 0
1976	Ba	Ba	Rewa	2 - 0
1977	Suva	Ba	Nadi	1 - 0
1978	Lautoka	Ba	Labasa	7 - 6
1979	T/Naitasiri	Ba	Nadl	2 – 1
1980	Ba	Ba	Nadi	1 - 0
1981	Suva	Suva	Ba	2 – 1
1982	Nadi	Ba	Nadi	default
1983	Suva	Suva	Ba	1 - 0
1984	Lautoka	Lautoka	Ba	2 - 0
1985	Ba	Lautoka	Rewa	2 – 1
1986	Rewa	Ba	Nadroga	1 - 0
1987	Not Contested	---	---	---
1988	Suva	Nadroga	Nasinu	1 - 0
1989	Lautoka	Nadroga	Lautoka	1 - 0
1990	Suva/Rewa	Nasinu	Suva	1 - 0
1991	Nadi	Ba	Nadroga	1 - 0
1992	Rewa	Labasa	Nadroga	2 - 0
1993	Ba	Nadroga	Nasinu	1 - 0
1994	Suva	Labasa	Suva	1 - 0
1995	Lautoka	Tavua	Nadi	2 - 0
1996	Suva	Ba	Nasinu	3 – 1
1997	Ba	Ba	Nadi	2 - 0
1998	Suva	Nadi	Lautoka	2 – 1
1999	Nadi	Nadi	Ba	1 - 0
2000	Ba	Ba	Nadi	1 - 0
2001	Suva	Rewa	Ba	1 - 0
2002	Ba	Nadi	Rewa	1 – 1
2003	Ba	Ba	Nadi	1 - 0
2004	Suva	Ba	Rewa	3 - 0 PK
2005	Lautoka	Lautoka	Ba	2 - 0
2006	Ba	Ba	Suva	3 - 0
2007	Suva	Ba	Nadi	2 – 1
2008	Ba	Lautoka	Ba	1 - 0
2009	Nadi	Navua	Lautoka	2 - 0
2010	Suva	Rewa	Lautoka	3 – 1
2011	Suva	Labasa	Ba	1 - 0
2012	Ba	Suva	Ba
2013	Lautoka	Ba	Nadi	2 – 1 (aet)
2014	Suva	Suva	Nadi	1 - 0 (aet)
2015	Ba	Ba	Nadi	2 - 0
2016	Suva	Labasa	Ba	2 – 1
2017	Lautoka	Lautoka	Ba	1 – 1 (aet; 5-4 pen)
2018	ANZ National Stadium, Suva	Lautoka	Suva	1 - 0 (Goal scored by Samuela Nabenia)
2019	Prince Charles Park, Nadi	Labasa	Suva	1 - 0 (Goal scored by Dennis Ifunaoa in Extra Time)
2020	ANZ National Stadium, Suva	Labasa	Lautoka	2 – 1
2022 Premier Division	HFC Bank Stadium, Suva	Nasinu	Seaqaqa	3 - 0
2022 Super Premier Division	HFC Bank Stadium, Suva	Suva	Navua	4 - 0
2023 Premier Division	HFC Bank Stadium, Suva	Nadroga	Tavua	4 – 1
2023 Super Premier Division	HFC Bank Stadium, Suva	Ba	Lautoka	2 – 1
2024 Super Premier Division	Churchill Park, Lautoka	Labasa	Navua	0 – 0 (5–4 pen)
2025 Super Premier Division	4R Electrical Stadium/Govind Park, Ba	Rewa	Ba	1 – 0
2026 Super Premier Division	HFC Bank Stadium, Suva	Ba	Navua	2-0

== 2018 Courts IDC ==
Date	Team 1	Score	Team 2	Group
5/10/18	Rewa	0-2	Tavua	Group B
5/10/18	Labasa	5 – 1	Nasinu	Group A
5/10/18	Suva	1-2	Nadi	Group B
5/10/18	Lautoka	2-0	Ba	Group A
6/10/18	Nadi	5 – 1	Tavua	Group B
6/10/18	Ba	4-0	Nasinu	Group A
6/10/18	Lautoka	0 – 1	Labasa	Group A
6/10/18	Suva	2 – 1	Rewa	Group B
7/10/18	Lautoka	8-0	Nasinu	Group A
7/10/18	Suva	2-0	Tavua	Group B
7/10/18	Nadi	3 – 1	Rewa	Group B
7/10/18	Ba	0-2	Labasa	Group A
9/10/18	Nadi	1-3	Lautoka	Semifinal 1
9/10/18	Labasa	0-4	Suva	Semifinal 2
10/10/18	Suva	0 – 1	Lautoka	Final

== 2019 Courts IDC ==
Date	Team 1	Score	Team 2	Group
12/10/19	Nadi	0-5	Labasa	Semifinal 1
12/10/19	Ba	0 – 1	Suva	Semifinal 2
13/10/19	Navua	1-0	Nadroga	Second Division Final
13/10/19	Labasa	1-0	Suva	Grand Final

IDC Premier Division Awards

- Golden Boot - Christopher Wasasala (Suva)
- Golden Ball - Antonio Tuivuna (Labasa)
- Fair Play Team - Suva
- New Find - Melvin Reddy (Labasa)

== 2020 Courts IDC ==
=== 2020 Courts IDC - Premier Division ===
Date	Team 1	Score	Team 2	Group
6/10/20	Suva	0 – 1	Nasinu	Group A
6/10/20	Labasa	0 – 1	Navua	Group B
6/10/20	Ba	2-2	Nadi	Group B
6/10/20	Lautoka	1 – 1	Rewa	Group A
7/10/20	Ba	2-0	Navua	Group B
7/10/20	Lautoka	2 – 1	Nasinu	Group A
7/10/20	Suva	4-2	Rewa	Group A
7/10/20	Labasa	4-0	Nadi	Group B
8/10/20	Rewa	5 – 1	Nasinu	Group A
8/10/20	Nadi	2 – 1	Navua	Group B
8/10/20	Suva	1 – 1	Lautoka	Group A
8/10/20	Ba	1-2	Labasa	Group B
10/10/20	Ba	1-2	Lautoka	Semifinal 1
10/10/20	Labasa	1-0	Rewa	Semifinal 2
11/10/20	Labasa	2 – 1	Lautoka	Final

IDC Premier Division Awards

- Golden Boot - Ilisoni Lolaivalu (Labasa)
- Golden Ball - Tevita Waranaivalu (Rewa)
- Golden Glove - Aquila Mateisuva (Labasa)
- Fair Play Team - Labasa

=== 2020 Courts IDC - Second Division ===
Date	Team 1	Score	Team 2	Group
6/10/20	Dreketi	0-0	Seaqaqa	Group A
6/10/20	Tailevu Naitasiri	2-0	Rakiraki	Group A
6/10/20	Nadroga	10-3	Nadogo	Group B
6/10/20	Bua	2 – 1	Tavua	Group B
7/10/20	Bua	6-2	Nadogo	Group B
7/10/20	Nadroga	1-0	Tavua	Group B
7/10/20	Tailevu Naitasiri	3 – 1	Dreketi	Group A
7/10/20	Rakiraki	3 – 1	Seaqaqa	Group A
8/10/20	Tailevu Naitasiri	4 – 1	Seaqaqa	Group A
8/10/20	Dreketi	3-2	Rakiraki	Group A
8/10/20	Nadogo	4 – 1	Tavua	Group B
8/10/20	Nadroga	2-0	Bua	Group B
10/10/20	Tailevu Naitasiri	1 – 1 (aet 2-4 pen)	Bua	Semifinal 1
10/10/20	Nadroga	3 – 1	Dreketi	Semifinal 2
11/10/20	Nadroga	3-0	Bua	Final

IDC Senior Division Awards

- Golden Boot - Taniela Raubula (Nadroga)
- Golden Ball - Paulo Buke (Nadroga)
- Golden Glove - Tevita Koroi (Tailevu Naitasiri)
- Fair Play Team - Bua

== 2022 Courts IDC ==
=== 2022 Courts IDC - Super Premier Division ===
Date	Team 1	Score	Team 2	Group
09/10/22	Suva	2 – 1	Rewa	Semifinal 1
09/10/22	Navua	2 – 1	Ba	Semifinal 2
10/10/22	Suva	4-0	Navua	Final

IDC Super Premier Division Awards

- Golden Boot - Azariah Soromon (Suva)
- Golden Ball - Azariah Soromon (Suva)
- Golden Glove - Aquila Mateisuva (Suva)
- Fair Play Team - Suva

=== 2022 Courts IDC - Premier Division ===
Date	Team 1	Score	Team 2	Group
09/10/22	Nasinu	3 – 1	Tavua	Semifinal 1
09/10/22	Seaqaqa	1 – 1 (aet 5-4 pen)	Nadogo	Semifinal 2
10/10/22	Nasinu	3-0	Seaqaqa	Final

=== 2022 Courts IDC - Senior Division ===
Date	Team 1	Score	Team 2	Group
09/10/22	Bua	1-0	Northland Tailevu	Semifinal 1
09/10/22	Lami	3-2	Dreketi	Semifinal 2
10/10/22	Bua	2 – 1	Lami	Final

== 2023 Courts IDC ==
=== 2023 Courts IDC - Super Premier Division ===
Date	Team 1	Score	Team 2	Group
15/10/23	Ba	2 – 1	Lautoka	Final

IDC Super Premier Division Awards

- Golden Ball - Nabil Begg (Ba)
- Golden Boot - Mohammed Raheem (Ba)
- Golden Glove - Misiwane Nairube (Ba)
- Fair Play Team - Ba

=== 2023 Courts IDC - Premier Division ===
Date	Team 1	Score	Team 2	Group
15/10/23	Nadroga	4 – 1	Tavua	Final

IDC Premier Division Awards

- Golden Ball - Semesa Sacere (Nadroga)
- Golden Glove - Sakeo Tagenaca (Nadroga)
- Fair Play Team - Nadroga

=== 2023 Courts IDC - Senior Division ===
Date	Team 1	Score	Team 2	Group
14/10/23	Bua	1-0	Nadogo	Semifinal 1
14/10/23	Lami	2-2 (aet 3-5 pen)	Northland Tailevu	Semifinal 2
15/10/23	Bua	4 – 1	Northland Tailevu	Final

IDC Senior Division Awards

- Golden Boot - Ratu Simone Rage (Bua)
- Golden Ball - Ratu Simone Rage (Bua)
- Golden Glove - Onisivoro Yavala (Bua)
- Fair Play Team - Northland Tailevu

== Summary of Winners and Runners-Up teams ==
Team	Number of Wins	Number of times runner-up
Ba F.C.	26	20
Lautoka F.C.	18	11
Suva F.C.	14	17
Rewa F.C.	10	7
Labasa F.C.	7	3
Nadi F.C.	6	18
Nadroga F.C.	3	3
Nasinu F.C.	1	3
Navua F.C.	1	2
Tavua F.C.	1	0
Tailevu/Naitasiri F.C.	0	1
Rakiraki F.C.	0	1

== Second Division Roll of Champions ==
Year	Venue	Winner	Runner-up	Score	Notes
1973		Bua
1977		Bua
1985	Ba	Lami	Vatukoula	3 - 2	Extra time
1986	Rewa	-	-	-	Not available
1987	-	-	-	-	No competition
1988	Suva	-	-	-	Not available
1989	Lautoka	-	-	-	Not available
1990	Suva/Rewa	-	-	-	Not available
1991	Nadi	-	-	-	Not available
1992	Rewa	-	-	-	Not available
1993	Ba	-	-	-	Not available
1994	Suva	-	-	-	Not available
1995	Lautoka	-	-	-	Not available
1996	Suva	-	-	-	Not available
1997	Ba	-	-	-	Not available
1998	Suva	-	-	-	Not available
1999	Nadi	Nadroga	Rewa	2 – 1	-
2000	Ba	Vatukoula	Tailevu North	1 - 0	-
2001	Suva	-	-	-	Not available
2002	Ba	Savusavu	Tailevu-Naitasiri	1 - 0	-
2003	Ba	Rakiraki	Tailevu-Naitasiri	2 – 1	-
2004	Suva	Rakiraki	-	-	-
2005	Lautoka	Tailevu-Naitasiri	Seaqaqa	2 – 1	-
2006	Ba	Rakiraki	Tailevu-Naitasiri	1 - 0	-
2007	Ba	Rakiraki	Tailevu-Naitasiri	3 - 0	-
2008	?	Tailevu-Naitasiri	Tailevu North	1 - 0	-
2009	?	Dreketi	Nadogo	1 - 0	-
2010	?	Tailevu-Naitasiri	Dreketi	1 - 0	-
2011	?	Lami	Tailevu-Naitasiri	3 – 1	-
2012	?	Tailevu-Naitasiri	Taveuni	2 - 0	-
2013	?	Taveuni	Dreketi	1 - 0	-
2014	Suva	Rakiraki	Nasinu	2 – 1	-
2015	Govind Park, Ba	Navua	Rakiraki	1 - 0	-
2016	ANZ National Stadium, Suva	Nasinu	Navua	3 – 1	[aet]
2017	Churchill Park, Lautoka	Nadroga	Navua	2 – 1
2018	ANZ National Stadium, Suva	Navua	Nadroga	2 - 0	Goal Scored by Vineet Chand and Seveci Rokotakala
2019	Prince Charles Park, Nadi	Navua	Nadroga	1 - 0	Goal Scored by Alfred Ali
2020	ANZ National Stadium, Suva	Nadroga	Bua	3 - 0
2022 Senior Division	HFC Bank Stadium, Suva	Bua	Lami	2 – 1	Both Bua's Goal Scored by Josaia Salauca
2023 Senior Division	HFC Bank Stadium, Suva	Bua	Northland Tailevu	4 – 1	Ratu Simione Rage scored a hat trick while Prasheel Lal scored the fourth goal for the defending champions, Sanjeev Naicker netted the lone for the Northland Tailevu.

== See also ==
- Fiji Football Association
- 2019 Inter-District Championship
- 2019 Inter-District Championship - Senior Division
