= Fiji FA Cup Tournament =

- Organiser(s): OFC
- Founded: 1991; 35 years ago
- Region: Oceania
- Qualifier for: OFC Champions League
- Current champions: Ba (9th title)
- Most championships: Ba (9 titles)
- Broadcaster: MAI TV
- 2025 FF Cup

Fiji FA Cup Tournament or Fiji Football Cup (Fijian: Bilo ni Viti ni Soka), more commonly known as the Fiji Cup (Fijian: Bilo ni Viti) or the FF Cup (Fijian: Bilo ni FF), is an annual knockout football competition in men's domestic Fijian football. It is organized by the Fiji Football Association.

== History ==
In 1991, the inaugural FF Cup took place in Ba. The inaugural season was won by Ba who defeated Labasa by 1-0.

== FF Cup Champions ==
Year	Venue	Winner	Runner-up	Score	Notes
1991	Ba	Ba	Labasa	1 - 0	-
1992	Labasa	Labasa	Nadroga	1 - 0	-
1993	Nadi	Nadroga	Tavua	2 - 0	-
1994	Rewa	Tavua	Suva	1 - 0	-
1995	Labasa	Suva	Labasa	4 - 0	-
1996	Nadi	Nadi	Lautoka	4 - 0	-
1997	Rewa	Ba/Labasa	-	0 - 0	Joint winners
1998	Rewa	Ba	Nadi	3 - 0	-
1999	Labasa	Labasa	Lautoka	2 - 1	-
2000	Nadi	Lautoka	Nadroga	2 - 0	-
2001	Nadroga	Nadroga	Labasa	7 - 6	Penalty kicks
2002	Lautoka	Lautoka	Nasinu	3 - 2	Penalty kicks
2003	Rewa	Navua	Rewa	1 - 0 (aet)	-
2004	Nadi	Ba	Suva	2 - 0	-
2005	Nadi	Ba	Nadi	1 - 0	-
2006	Suva	Ba	Labasa	3 - 0	-
2007	Ba	Ba	Labasa	1 - 0	-
2008	Suva	Navua	Labasa	1 - 0	-
2009	Suva	Navua	Lautoka	2 - 1 (aet)	-
2010	Lautoka	Ba	Navua	1 - 0	-
2011	Lautoka	Rewa	Labasa	1 - 0	-
2012	Ba	Suva	Ba	1 - 0	-
2013	Suva, Nadi	Nadi	Ba	3 - 1	-
2014	Nausori	Nadi	Suva	1 - 0 (aet)	-
2015	Nadi	Labasa	Rewa	2 - 0	-
2016	Labasa, Suva	Nadi	Suva	3 - 0	Penalty kicks
2017	Rewa	Rewa F.C.	Nadi F.C.	1 - 0	-
2018	Rewa	Rewa F.C.	Labasa F.C.	5 - 3	Penalty kicks
2019	Lautoka	Nadi	Suva	2 - 1	-
2020	Labasa	Suva	Nadi	1 - 0	-
2021	-	-	-	-	not held due to the COVID-19 pandemic
2022	Sigatoka	Suva F.C.	Labasa F.C.	2 - 0	-
2023	Suva	Lautoka F.C.	Rewa F.C.	2 - 1 (aet)	-
2024	Labasa	Lautoka F.C.	Navua F.C.	1 - 0	-
2025	Suva	Labasa F.C.	Rewa F.C.	4 - 2	1-1 at full-time, nil-all in extra-time and 3-1 in a penalty shootout
2026	Labasa	Ba F.C	Navua	0 - 0	3-1 in a penalty shootout

== Most successful teams ==
Team	Number of Wins	Number of times runner-up	Notes
Ba F.C.	9	2	One title shared
Nadi F.C.	5	4	-
Labasa F.C.	5	9	One title shared
Suva F.C.	4	5	-
Lautoka F.C.	4	3	-
Rewa F.C.	3	3	-
Navua F.C.	3	3	-
Nadroga F.C.	2	2	-
Tavua F.C.	1	1	-
Nasinu F.C.	0	1	-

== President's Cup ==
Year	Venue	Winner	Runner-up	Score	Notes
2020		Savusavu	Nadogo		
2022	Lawaqa Park, Sigatoka	Tavua	Tailevu North	3-1	
2023		Savusavu			
2024	Subrail Park, Labasa	Bua	Seaqaqa	6-5	Penalty Shoot Out

== Awards ==
- 2015

Golden Boot: Peni Finau, 5 Goals
Player of the Tournament: Taniela Waqa

- 2017

Golden Boot: Ravinesh Karan Singh, 4 Goals
Player of the Tournament: Samuela Kautoga

- 2022

Fair Play Team of the Tournament Award: Nadi FC
Golden Glove Award: Beniamino Mateinaqara Suva FC
Golden Boot Award: Sairusi Nalaubu (5)
Player of the Tournament Award: Shahil Dave Suva FC

- 2023

Fair Play Team of the Tournament Award: Rewa FC
Golden Glove Award: Senirusi Bokini Lautoka FC
Golden Boot Award: Jared Rongusolia (5) Navua FC
Player of the Tournament Award: Aporosa Yada Lautoka FC

- 2024

President's Cup

Fair Play Team of the Tournament Award: Bua FC
Golden Glove Award: Timoci Naqete Bua FC
Golden Boot Award: Mohammed Zaid Bua FC
Player of the Tournament Award: Mohammed Zaid Bua FC
