= 2017 Fiji Premier League =

- Season: 2017
- Champions: Lautoka F.C. (4th title)
- Relegated: Rakiraki F.C.
- Matches: 56
- Goals: 165 (2.95 per match)
- Top goalscorer: Saula Waqa (10 goals)

The 2017 Fiji Premier League was the 41st season of the Fiji Premier League (Vodafone Premier League for sponsorship reasons) organised by the Fiji Football Association since its establishment in 1977.

Lautoka were the undefeated champions. Lautoka also recorded the best ever season for a Fijian club in top-flight football.

== Team changes ==
=== To Fiji Premier League ===
Promoted from 2016 Fiji Super Premier Division

- Rakiraki

=== From Fiji Premier League ===
Relegated to 2017 Fiji Super Premier Division

- Nadroga

== Teams ==
=== Stadiums and locations ===
Team	Location	Stadium	Capacity
Ba	Ba	Govind Park	13,500
Dreketi	Labasa	Subrail Park	10,000
Labasa	Labasa	Subrail Park	10,000
Lautoka	Lautoka	Churchill Park	18,000
Rewa	Nausori	Vodafone Ratu Cakobau Park	8,000
Nadi	Nadi	Prince Charles Park	18,000
Rakiraki	Ra	Garvey Park	4,500
Suva	Suva	ANZ Stadium	30,000

== Standings ==
Pos	Team	Pld	W	D	L	GF	GA	GD	Pts	Promotion or relegation
1	Lautoka (Q)	14	13	1	0	35	6	+29	40	Qualification to 2018 OFC Champions League
2	Ba (Q)	14	9	1	4	32	12	+20	28	Qualification to 2018 OFC Champions League
3	Labasa	14	7	3	4	23	13	+10	24	
4	Suva	14	8	0	6	25	15	+10	24	
5	Rewa	14	6	3	5	20	20	0	21	
6	Nadi	14	5	2	7	16	19	−3	17	
7	Dreketi	14	2	1	11	8	35	−27	7	
8	Rakiraki (R)	14	0	1	13	6	45	−39	1	Relegation to Fiji Senior League

Updated to match(es) played on August 26, 2017. Source: footballsource.co.uk rsssf.com fijivillage.com
Rules for classification: 1) Points; 2) Goal difference; 3) Goals scored; 4) Head-to-head points; 5) Head-to-head goal difference; 6) Head-to-head goal scored; 7) Head-to-head away goal scored.
(Q) Qualified for the phase indicated; (R) Relegated

== Results ==
Home \ Away	BA	DRE	LAB	LAU	NDI	RWA	RAK	SUV
Ba		3–0	3–0	0–1	2–1	4–0	3–1	1–0
Dreketi	1–4		0–2	0–6	0–1	1–1	3–2	0–2
Labasa	3–0	2–0		0–2	2–2	4–0	2–0	3–0
Lautoka	1–0	3–0	2–1		4–2	1–0	4–0	2–1
Nadi	1–0	1–0	1–1	0–2		2–3	1–0	0–1
Rewa	1–1	4–0	0–0	0–4	2–0		2–0	1–2
Rakiraki	0–8	0–1	0–3	1–1	0–4	0–3		1–5
Suva	1–2	4–1	1–0	0–1	2–0	2–1	5–0	

Updated to match(es) played on 26 August 2017. Source:
Legend: Blue = home team win; Yellow = draw; Red = away team win.

== Top scorers ==
As of match 26 August 2017

Rank	Player	Club	Goals
1	(Fiji) Saula Waqa	Ba	10
2	(Fiji) Siotame Kubu	Lautoka	9
2	(Fiji) Ravinesh Karan Singh	Suva	9
4	(Fiji) Zibraaz Sahib	Lautoka	8
5	(Fiji) Samuela Nabenia	Ba	7
6	(Fiji) Sairusi Nalabu	Suva	5
6	(Fiji) Dave Radrigai	Lautoka	5
6	(Fiji) Christopher Wasasala	Labasa	5

== Attendances ==
#	Football club	Average attendance
1	Lautoka FC	1,975
2	Labasa FC	1,207
3	Suva FC	810
4	Rewa FC	809
5	Dreketi FC	685
6	Nadi FA	691
7	Rakiraki FC	279
8	Ba FA	200
