= Seaqaqa =

Seaqaqa सेअंगगंगा (Hindi)
- Town
- Location in Fiji
- Coordinates: 16°31′19″S 179°08′20″E
- Country: Fiji
- Island: Vanua Levu
- Division: Northern Division
- Province: Macuata
- District: Seaqaqa

Population (2017)
  - Total: 592

Demographics (2007)
  - Ethnic groups: 312 Fijians (38.2%); 487 Indo-Fijians (59.7%); 17 others (2.1%)

Seaqaqa (Fijian pronunciation: [seaŋɡaˈŋɡa]) is an unincorporated town in Fiji. It had a population of 394 in 1996, 816 in 2007, and 592 in 2017. The town has Seaqaqa F.C., a football club. Seaqaqa has a primary school, a college, and a health centre. Seaqaqa was the site of a brief and unsuccessful anti-colonial uprising in 1894. In the 1970s, an ambitious cane development scheme was realized in Seaqaqa.

== Geography ==
Seaqaqa is located in the inland area and on the major link road between the towns of Savusavu and Labasa, on the island of Vanua Levu. It is located about 23 kilometres (14 mi) from Labasa. The district often experiences dry spells, particularly from May to September, which is beneficial for good cane production, although costing over 4 million Fijian dollars in water carting, and causing cholera and scabies outbreaks in children. The vast majority of soils (95%) are ferruginous latosols and red yellow podzolics, which drain well, tend to dry out during periods of low rainfall, and are less fertile than the soils of other Fijian cane production areas, thus requiring higher amounts of fertiliser. The land is flat to undulating, much of which ranges from 100 to 175 metres above sea level.

== History ==
=== Seaqaqa War ===
In mid-1894 a brief and unsuccessful uprising against colonial authorities, sometimes known as the Seaqaqa War, took place in the area. It occurred due to the people of Seaqaqa and Sasa being classed as Macuata subjects by the colonial government, despite them being traditionally linked with Wailevu. It was the last open armed confrontation between villagers and the colonial government. Following the defeat of the uprising, Governor John Bates Thurston ordered the amalgamation of the towns of Nacereyaga, Delaiviti, Navakaiteqe, Vuna, Watidratagane, Nukuseva, Naisogolato, Calalevu, and Savuroloka, with Natua to become only one town, saying that "small towns without a town-chief, and impossible to be supervised, originated trouble".

=== Seaqaqa cane development scheme ===
Prior to 1974 the area was sparsely populated, with about 150 Indo-Fijian and 50 Fijian families residing here, the former of which had been present since an unsuccessful 1963 rice scheme.

Following independence in 1970, starting in 1974 the ambitious Seaqaqa cane development scheme was realized as part of the Sixth (1971–75) and Seventh (1976–80) Development Plans by the ruling Alliance Party. The primary goal was to increase national cane production, although a secondary goal was to increase the participation of Fijians (particularly unemployed rural Indo-Fijians and Fijians engaged primarily in subsistence agriculture) in the cash economy. This area had been chosen because of the presence of a mill at Labasa, deemed most suitable for expansion, because of Seaqaqa plateau's suitability for cane, and due to the willingness of local land owners to offer a significant amount of land. It included the planned settlement of 800 people (400 Fijians and 400 Indo-Fijians) at Natua village and cost 22 million Fijian dollars, with funds borrowed from the World Bank. By 1980 five thousand hectares had been planted with sugarcane, although 12,646 hectares within the scheme were unused as of 1983, with 44% of them potentially suitable for arable farming. The scheme is considered a success, with Seaqaqa producing 241,000 tonnes of cane in 1979, and 316,000 tonnes by 1983, surpassing the World Bank estimate of 200,000 tonnes per year by 1980.

=== 21st century ===
During the events of the 2000 Fijian coup d'état, on 9 July, the police station at Seaqaqa was occupied along with a police station at Savusavu to the south by rebels supporting George Speight, and Seaqaqa was described by The Sydney Morning Herald as an area "where support for the rebels is strong". Telecom Fiji cut off lines to both occupied police stations, which may have partially led to a Telecom Fiji executive in Vanua Levu being detained by rebels. Former President Kamisese Mara owned a farm in Seaqaqa, and by 26 July, rebels "had set fire to the buildings and burnt the crops".

In early 2015, the Ahmadiyya Noor Mosque in Seaqaqa was described as "newly-built". In 2015, a bridge was built in Nasuva village, which cost 100,000 Fijian dollars.

Since 2018 Seaqaqa has been in the process of getting its own township and becoming an incorporated town, which would mean that it would get its own town council. As of 2022 the area was served by Labasa Town Council. This process is associated with various construction plans, such as the construction of a bus station and a new market. The project was delayed by two years due to the COVID-19 pandemic and budget constraints.

The Seaqaqa Legal Aid Office was opened in 2019. In 2020 the old one lane Vesidrua Bridge across the Nasuva River was replaced by a new two lane bridge and a walkway. Previously, a temporary Bailey bridge was erected beside Vesidrua Bridge in July 2019 so that the river could still be crossed while the replacement bridge was being built. In December 2020 the Seaqaqa district was severely impacted by Cyclone Yasa.

== Sports ==
Seaqaqa has a football team, Seaqaqa F.C. In 2017, it was reported that a $30 million sports complex would be built, although nothing came of it. In 2022 the Seaqaqa Pride Hub organisation was awarded with a grant from the Play for Equity fund of Team Up, a program of the Australian government.
