= Samuela Drudru =

Fijian footballer

Personal information
- Full name: Samuela Drudru
- Date of birth: 30 April 1989 (age 37)
- Place of birth: Fiji
- Position: Forward

Team information
- Current team: Suva
- Number: 14

Senior career*
Years	Team	Apps	(Gls)
2009–2011	Lautoka		
2011–2016	Nadi		
2016	Suva		
2017–2019	Lautoka	32	(19)
2020–2021	Ba	14	(7)
2022–	Suva	28	(11)

International career
2012	Fiji U-23	5	
2015–	Fiji	12	(4)
Medal record
Men's football
Representing Fiji
Pacific Games
Bronze medal – third place	2019 Samoa
- * Club domestic league appearances and goals as of 30 December 2023

Samuela Drudru (born 30 April 1989) is a Fijian footballer who plays as a forward for Suva. He made his debut for the national team in August 2015 in their 5–0 victory against Tonga.

In 2017, Drudru started playing for Lautoka in the Fiji Premier League.

== Club ==
As of 20 October 2019.

Club	Season	League			Cup		Continental		Other		Total	
Club	Season	Division	Apps	Goals	Apps	Goals	Apps	Goals	Apps	Goals	Apps	Goals
Lautoka	2017	Premier League	11	3	0	0	0	0	0	0	11	3
Lautoka	2018	Premier League	9	4	0	0	5	2	0	0	14	6
Lautoka	2019	Premier League	12	12	11	6	3	3	0	0	26	21
Total			32	19	11	6	8	5	0	0	51	30

== International career ==
=== International goals ===
Scores and results list Fiji's goal tally first.

No.	Date	Venue	Opponent	Score	Result	Competition
1.	18 March 2019	ANZ National Stadium, Suva, Fiji	New Caledonia	1–0	3–0	Friendly
2.	18 March 2019	ANZ National Stadium, Suva, Fiji	New Caledonia	2–0	3–0	Friendly
3.	8 July 2019	National Soccer Stadium, Apia, Samoa	Tahiti	1–0	2–1	2019 Pacific Games
4.	18 July 2019	National Soccer Stadium, Apia, Samoa	Solomon Islands	2–0	4–4	2019 Pacific Games

== Honours ==
Nadi

- Fiji League: 2015

Lautoka

- Fiji League: 2017
- OFC Champions League: Runner-up, 2018

Fiji

- Pacific Games: Bronze Medalist, 2019
