= Rusiate Matarerega =

Fijian footballer

Personal information
- Date of birth: 17 January 1993 (age 33)
- Place of birth: Fiji
- Position: Forward

Team information
- Current team: Nadroga
- Number: 5

Senior career*
Years	Team	Apps	(Gls)
2010–2014	Nadi		
2014–2015	Lautoka		
2015–2017	Suva		
2017–2021	Nadi	55	(30)
2021	Nadroga	8	(3)
2022	Rewa	7	(4)
2023	Suva	13	(5)
2024-	Nadroga	7	(6)

International career^{‡}
2013	Fiji U20	4	(5)
2016–	Fiji	18	(4)
Medal record
Men's football
Representing Fiji
OFC U-20 Championship
Runner-up	2013 Fiji
Pacific Games
Bronze medal – third place	2019 Samoa
Pacific Mini Games
Silver medal – second place	2017 Vanuatu
- * Club domestic league appearances and goals as of 23 April 2024 ‡ National team caps and goals as of 13 June2024

Rusiate Matarerega (born 17 January 1993) is a Fijian footballer who plays as a forward for Nadroga in the Fijian National Football League.

== Club ==
As of 11 October 2019.

Cup: Fiji Football Association Cup Tournament, Inter-District Championship, Battle of the Giants and Champion versus Champion

Club	Season	League			Cup		Continental		Other		Total	
Club	Season	Division	Apps	Goals	Apps	Goals	Apps	Goals	Apps	Goals	Apps	Goals
Nadi	Fiji Premier League											
Nadi	Fiji Premier League	2014	0	0	-		3	0	-		3	0
Nadi	Fiji Premier League	2015	0	0	-		2	0	-		2	0
Nadi	Fiji Premier League	2016	0	0	-		3	1	-		3	1
Nadi	Fiji Premier League	2017	14	3	-		0	0	-		14	3
Nadi	Fiji Premier League	2018	12	8	-		0	0	-		12	8
Nadi	Fiji Premier League	2019	11	11	11	7	0	0	-		22	18
Total			37	22	11	7	8	1	0	0	56	30

== International career ==
=== International goals ===
Scores and results list Fiji's goal tally first.

No	Date	Venue	Opponent	Score	Result	Competition
1.	2 December 2017	Port Vila Municipal Stadium, Port Vila, Vanuatu	Tuvalu	4–0	8–0	2017 Pacific Mini Games
2.	15 December 2017	Port Vila Municipal Stadium, Port Vila, Vanuatu	New Caledonia	4–1	4–1	2017 Pacific Mini Games
3.	18 March 2019	ANZ National Stadium, Suva, Fiji	New Caledonia	3–0	3–0	Friendly
4.	15 July 2019	National Soccer Stadium, Apia, Samoa	Tuvalu	2–0	10–1	2019 Pacific Games

== Private life ==
Matarerega is the son of former Lautoka, Nadi and Fiji national rep, Watisoni Voli.

== Honours ==
Fiji

- Pacific Games: Bronze Medalist, 2019
- Pacific Mini Games: Silver Medalist, 2017

Fiji U20

- OFC U-20 Championship: Runner-up, 2013
