= Football in Fiji =

- Country: Fiji
- Governing body: Fiji Football Association
- National teams: men's national team women's national team

National competitions
- Fiji Football Association Cup Tournament

Club competitions
- FPL (1st tier); FSL (2nd tier)

International competitions
- OFC Professional League; OFC Champions League

The sport of football (also known as soccer) in the country of Fiji is run by the Fiji Football Association. The association administers the national football team as well as the FPL. The national team has had little international success. Approximately 40% of the people in Fiji are considered association football fans, making it second most popular sport in the country, after rugby union.

== History ==
Football started to be played in Fiji ever since the arrival of Europeans in the country, and the establishment of towns like Levuka where significant numbers of sports enthusiasts could congregate and socialise with a friendly game. Missionaries, who established schools in Fiji, introduced football as part of the school program and the sport was being played in schools as early as 1889. The Suva Soccer Football Club was formed in 1905, made up of European employees of the Government and businesses, and similar clubs existed in Nausori and Levuka. In 1910, a team representing Suva played a match against a team representing Nausori. The crews of visiting naval ships also entertained themselves with friendly games of football with local teams. In 1910 a team from Suva played a game against a team from HMS Powerful and won 3 goals to 1. In 1914, a team from Suva played against a team from HMS Torch, at Albert Park, and won by 2 goals to nil.

=== Native Fijian football ===
Fijian teams started playing competitive football in 1924. The first Fijian Inter-District Tournament was played at Nasau Park, Levuka, during celebrations marking the golden jubilee of Cession in 1924. Teams played for the Ricarnie Cup which was won by the Sawani team from Naitasiri. The following year, Bau won the cup. Players played the game barefoot and relied on speed and stamina. Other teams to compete in the tournament were Shamrock from Suva, Kadavu (from Suva), Lomaiviti (from Suva) and Ovalau (from Levuka).

Meanwhile, football was also being played by Fijians in Lautoka. A Friday and Saturday league was organised at the Veitari Grounds and teams that took part were Namoli, Vitogo, Vakabuli, Saru, Yalobi (from Waya), Kadavu, Vanua Levu and Topline. The Namoli Native Soccer Club won the league nine times in a row between 1941 and 1949. A prominent member of the club was Ratu Meli Qoro, who also acted as an official and referee at tournaments. He had learnt to play football at the local Methodist Mission Primary school. In the northern division, football was played between the Wainikoro and Waibula District Fijian Schools in 1938.

The success of Fijians at rugby, tempered their enthusiasm for football and the physical nature of rugby appealed to them and gradually organized football amongst the Fijians died out.

Schools run by missionaries, also taught students to play football. Brother Mark, a Marist missionary from New Zealand introduced football to Marist Brothers Indian School in Toorak, Suva and organised games with students from other schools. As the students grew up and left school, they started playing football socially on their own.

In 1922, the Sunshine Club was established in Suva. Gradually other teams, like Morning Star, Nausori Central, Vuci and Wainibokasi, were established in Rewa and played at the Dilkusha Grounds. There were also four teams in Suva who played at the Marist Brothers School grounds in Toorak.

=== Football associations around Fiji ===
Rewa started its own league in 1928 and the Rewa United Football Club was formed to take part in the Vriddhi Cup Tournament. The other team from Rewa was the Dilkusha Excelsior. The local league had four teams in 1940. In Lautoka, John Bairangi led the formation of the Lautoka Soccer Football Association in 1934. Initially there were two teams, Namoli Sports and Service. Levuka had an organised local competition in 1932 and these clubs formed the Levuka Soccer Association in 1938. The Nadi Soccer Association was formed in 1937 with four teams: Koronubu, Sabeto, Bhartiya and Vutualevu. From 1940 the football playing districts of the western division, played for the Caine's Cup.

=== Formation of Fiji Football Association ===
In August 1961, the Fiji Football Association was formed which was a truly multiracial and national body. With this new status Fiji's football team participated in first South Pacific Games held in Suva in 1963. The opening up of football to all races saw teams like Ba immediately benefiting from the new arrangement. Football in Ba had long enjoyed support from the Fijian community and Ba soon had some good and famous Fijians playing in its team. Suva's multiracial population also provided early opportunity for people of other races to join the football competitions.

Football in Fiji was dominated by the Ba team in the sixties. In the sixties Ba won the inter-district football tournament five times, the last three in a row from 1966 to 1968. Ba also won the North-west football tournament and the Sugar Cup. In 1968, the Fiji Football Association adopted a two tier system where Ba, Labasa, Lautoka, Nadi, Rakiraki, Rewa, Sigatoka and Suva were placed in division A and Levuka, Tailevu-Naitasiri, Tailevu North, Savusavu, Taveuni and Navua were placed in division B. Division B competed for the Fiji Football Association Cup, won for the first time by Levuka. At the end of the season there were promotion-relegation matches. In 1969 the inter-district football tournament was held in Labasa for the first time and Nadi won the trophy for the first time.

In the 1970s, the association was able to convince town councils to build permanent seating structures and grounds for football and by the late nineties all A division teams, except two had such facilities. From 1976 pool play was introduced into the inter-district football tournament.

=== Formation of National Fiji League ===
In 1977, Fiji's top-tier football league was formed which was the National Fiji League. The first ever season was won by Ba. For years, there was no promotion and relegation system.

In 1980, the Fiji Football Association acquired its own building, which is being used as an administration centre. For the first time since 1938, the inter-district football tournament was not held in 1987. This was due to uncertainties following the coup and restrictions on playing football on Sundays. 1988 was the golden jubilee year for the association as football in Fiji learnt to perform under the new post-coup conditions.

Football is now well established in Fiji with people of all races taking part. Facilities for players have been greatly improved and the Fiji national side regularly takes part in international tournaments.

=== Formation of Fiji Senior League ===
In 2016, the Fiji Senior League was formed to make a promotion and relegation system.

== League system ==
Fiji football league system
- Country: Fiji
- Sport: Association football
- Promotion and relegation: Yes

National system
- Federation: Fiji Football Association
- Confederation: OFC
- Top division: Premier League
- Second division: Senior League
- Cup competition: FF Cup

Throughout history, the Fijian football league system has changed. Currently, Fiji has two divisions in professional men's football: the Premier League and the Senior League. A system of promotion and relegation exists between the two divisions.

=== Current system (since 2016) ===
The current Fijian football league system has been used since 2016, when the Senior League was created.

Level	League	
1	Fiji Premier League; 10 clubs no promotion ↓ relegate 1	
2	Fiji Senior League; 10 clubs, 2 in playoffs ↑ promote 1 no relegation	
2	Vanua Levu Zone; 6 clubs ↑ 1 to playoffs no relegation	Viti Levu Zone; 4 clubs ↑ 1 to playoffs no relegation

=== Previous system (1977–2016) ===
In 1977, the National League was founded. This league did not have promotion or relegation. In 2016, the National League was renamed the Premier League and a second division, the Senior League, was introduced to allow promotion and relegation.

Level	League
1	Fiji National League; 8 clubs no promotion no relegation

=== Women's structure ===
In 2021, the first ever professional women's football leagues in Fiji were founded. They operate with a promotion and relegation system, similar to the men's structure.

Level	League
1	Fiji Women's Super League; 7 clubs no promotion ↓ relegate 1
2	Fiji Women's Senior League; 12 clubs (from 4 zones) ↑ promote 1

== Football stadiums in Fiji ==
#	Stadium	Capacity	City	Club	Image
1	HFC Bank Stadium	15,000	Suva	Association football: Suva F.C.	
2	Churchill Park	10,000	Lautoka	Association football: Lautoka F.C.	
3	Subrail Park	10,000	Labasa	Association football: Dreketi F.C., Labasa F.C.	

== Attendances ==
The average attendance per top-flight football league season and the club with the highest average attendance:

Season	League average	Best club	Best club average
2017	832	Lautoka FC	1,975

Source: League page on Wikipedia

== See also ==
- Lists of stadiums
