= Nasinu =

Nasinu नासिनु (Hindi)
- Town
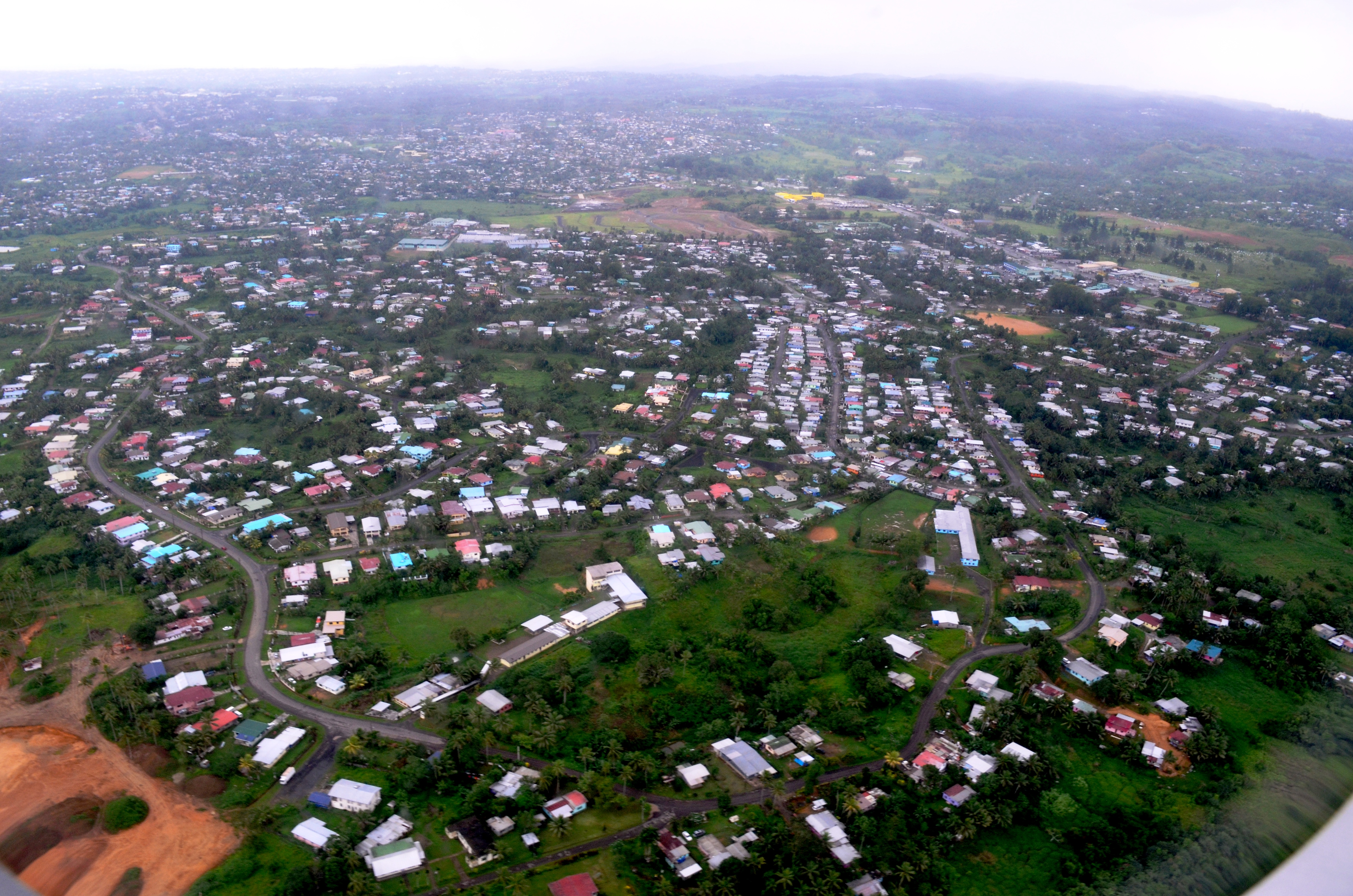
- Aerial view of the vast residential part of Nasinu

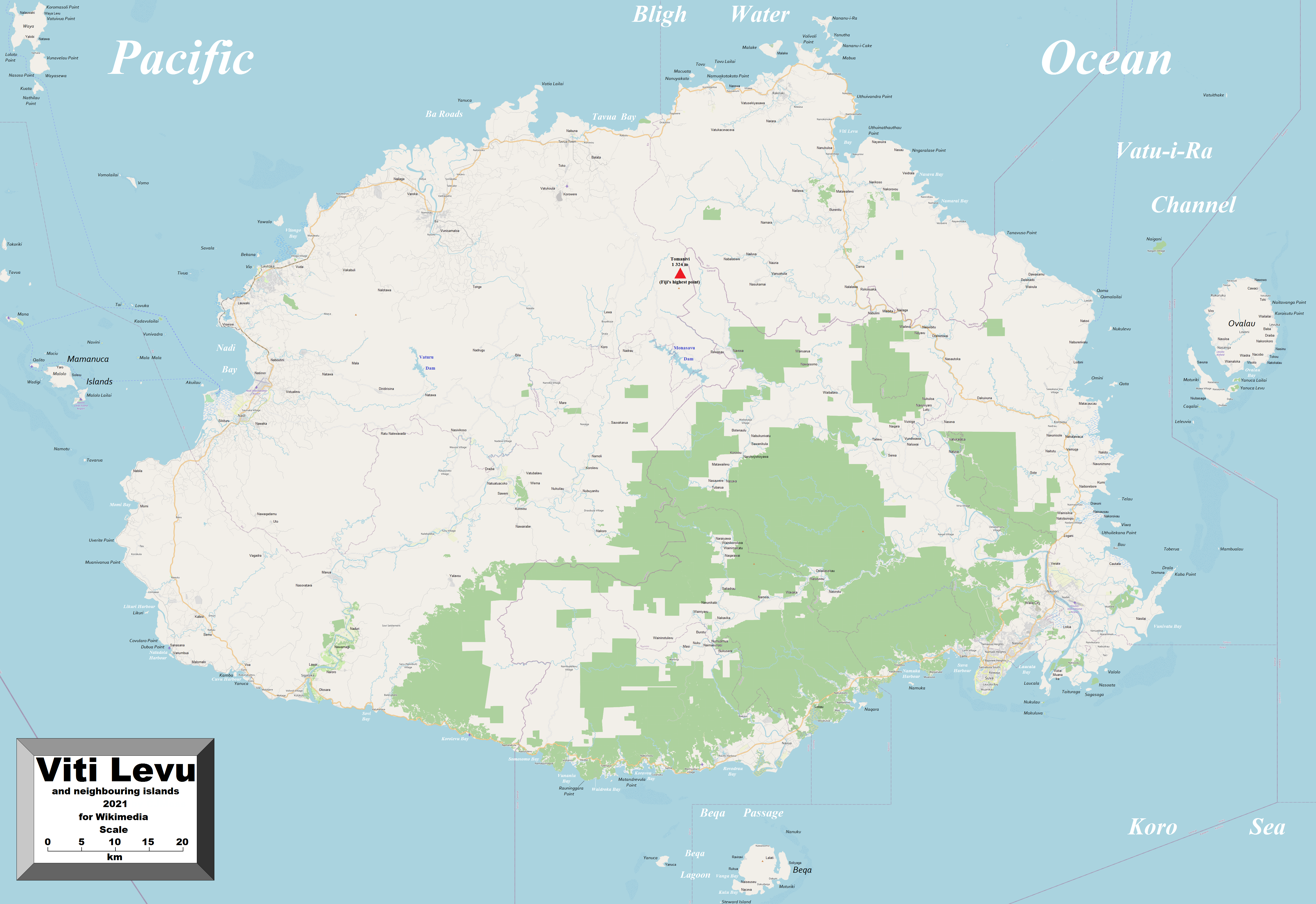
- Viti Levu with Nasinu in the southeast

- Location in Fiji
- Coordinates: 18°4′0″S 178°30′0″E
- Country: Fiji
- Island: Viti Levu
- Division: Central Division
- Province: Naitasiri
- Town: 1999

Population (2017)
  - Total: 92,043
- Time zone: UTC+12

Nasinu (Fijian pronunciation: [nasinu]) is an urban area on the island Viti Levu in Fiji. It is officially designated a "Town" and was formally incorporated as such in 1999. The population of Nasinu was 92,043 at the 2017 Census. Its land area is the largest of any municipal area in Fiji, and more than twice that of the capital Suva. It is a major residential hub in Fiji, housing a large majority of the work force in Nasinu itself and in the Fijian capital, Suva. The Nasinu property market has experienced significant growth over the last several years, leading to substantial increases in property value.

== Nasinu Town ==
The Township of Nasinu is experiencing significant growth as a result of investments made by Indians who live in Fiji. The town is located on Daniva Road and houses several companies, professional services and numerous shops. However, the lack of land in this area is stifling further development of Nasinu into a premier township of Fiji. It is also pushing commercial development elsewhere within Nasinu and surrounding area.

== Nasinu suburbs ==
Nasinu comprises the following suburbs: Laucala Beach Estate, Valelevu, Nadera, Nadawa, Caubati, Kinoya, Newtown, Nasole, Nepani, Tacirua New Sub, Tacirua old Sub, Makoi, Narere.

Laucala Beach Estate and Valelevu are the most developed and desirable of these suburbs and have seen significant growth in the property market. As a result, there has been an increase in house prices and rental three-fold over the last five years.

== Health facilities ==
The Valelevu and Makoi Bhanabhai Health Centres are the primary health care facilities in the Nasinu area. Both are government run facilities.

Valelevu Health Centre is situated on the corner Daniva Road after the Valelevu Police Station. It has a population catchment of 50,187 (2010 Figures) through seven zones (Nadera & Nadawa) [largest population]; Kinoya or Laucala Beach [LBE], Caubati [largest geographically], Newtown, Tacirua (Dokanaisuva), Kalabu, Services offered are: General Outpatient Services; Special Outpatient Services; Emergency Services; Family Planning; Maternal Child Health; Services; Dental Services; Pharmacy Services; and Zone Nursing.

Makoi Bhanabhai Health Centre is situated on Matainikorovatu Road behind Hanson's Supermarket. It has a population catchment of 24, 902 (2010 Figures) Services offered are: General Outpatient Services; Special Outpatient Services; Emergency Services; Family Planning; Maternal Child Health; Services; Dental Services; Pharmacy Services; and Zone Nursing.

== Places of interest in Nasinu ==
- Fiji National University (FNU)- main Campus
- Land Transport Authority headquarters
- Housing Authority of Fiji headquarters
- Fiji Military Forces Officer Training Camp (Amy Training Group)
- Nasinu Juvenile Prison – Fiji's only juvenile corrections center
- Kinoya Sewerage Plant – Fiji's largest urban sewerage treatment plant
- Water Authority of Fiji headquarters
- Suva-Nausori corridor, Fiji's largest urban population centre linking the capital Suva with Nausori town
