= Bua F.C. =

Fijian football club

Bua FC
- Full name: Bua Football Club
- Nickname: The Northerners
- Founded: 1976
- Ground: Bua Primary School Ground
- Capacity: 1000
- Chairman: (Fiji) Ram Naresh
- Manager: (Fiji) Jay Kumar
- League: Digicel Senior League - Vanua Levu Zone
- 2023: 3rd
Home colours

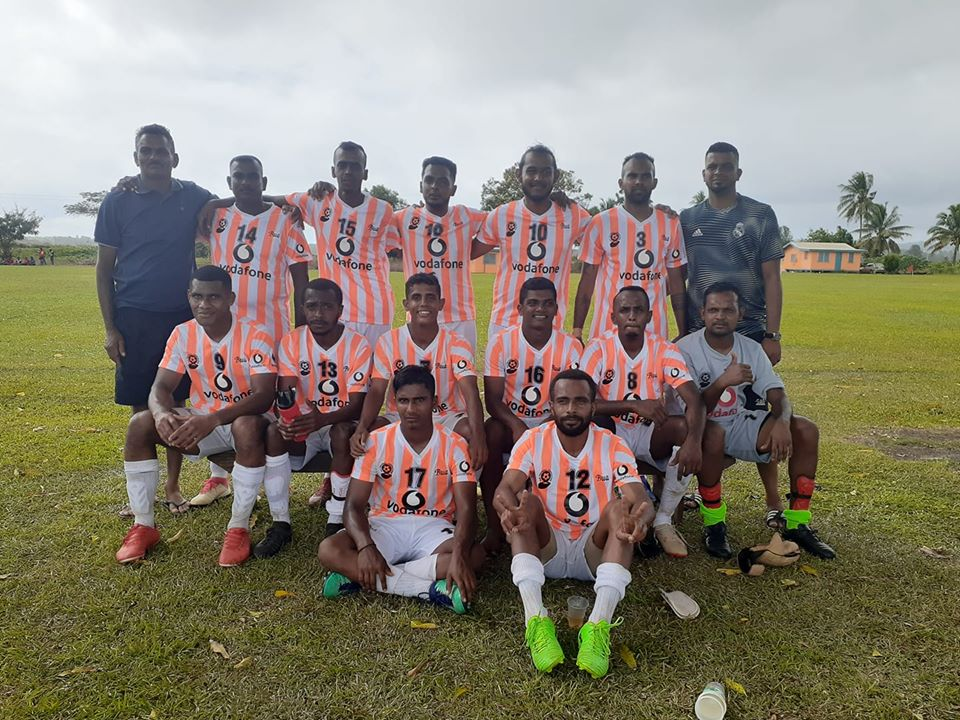
Bua FC team in 2020

Bua Football Club also known as Bua Football Association is a semi-professional Fijian football team playing in the second division of the Fiji Football Association competitions. It is based in Bua, which is a province on the western end of the island of Vanua Levu. Their home stadium is Bua Primary School Ground. Their uniform includes orange shirt.

== History ==
The Bua Association was formed in 1976, under the presidency of Jag Ram.

== Current squad ==
Squad for the 2023 Inter-District Championship

Note: Flags indicate national team as defined under FIFA eligibility rules; some limited exceptions apply. Players may hold more than one non-FIFA nationality.

No.	Pos.	Nation	Player
1	GK	FIJ	Onisivoro Yavala
2	DF	FIJ	Prashneel Lal
3	MF	FIJ	Josaia Salauca
4	DF	FIJ	Aduru Kuva
5	MF	FIJ	Rishal Prasad
6	DF	FIJ	Davitesh Mihaal Raju
7	FW	FIJ	Ratu Simone Rage (captain)
8	MF	FIJ	Prashant Prasad
9	FW	FIJ	Jeshwindra Prasad
10	FW	FIJ	Kaliveti Nateru
11	DF	FIJ	Amresh Aman Prasad (3rd captain)

No.	Pos.	Nation	Player
12	DF	FIJ	Radesh Raj
13	DF	FIJ	Naizal Hussein
14	DF	FIJ	Avinesh PRASAD
15	MF	FIJ	Vikesh Rikneel Prasad (vice-captain)
16	DF	FIJ	Kritiv Singh
17	MF	FIJ	Ratu Tuinakabati
18	MF	FIJ	Pranit Nand
19	MF	FIJ	Rohit Chand
20	MF	FIJ	Setareki Raiole
21	GK	FIJ	Ritesh Chand
22	GK	FIJ	Sumit Chand

=== Other players under contract ===
Note: Flags indicate national team as defined under FIFA eligibility rules; some limited exceptions apply. Players may hold more than one non-FIFA nationality.

No. / Pos. / Nation / Player; 23 / DF / FIJ / Vinal Vikash Chand	No. / Pos. / Nation / Player; 24 / MF / FIJ / Ramend Prasad

=== Youth squad ===
Note: Flags indicate national team as defined under FIFA eligibility rules; some limited exceptions apply. Players may hold more than one non-FIFA nationality.

No.	Pos.	Nation	Player
1	GK	FIJ	Manasa NAWAKULA
2		FIJ	Ravnil PRASAD
3		FIJ	Swarab KUMAR
4		FIJ	Osea SIVO
5		FIJ	Shivnesh PRASAD
6		FIJ	Jitnesh KUMAR
7		FIJ	Shernal CHAND
8		FIJ	Aklesh PRAKASH
9		FIJ	Sikeli VUKEI
10	FW	FIJ	Rishal Prasad
11		FIJ	Pita SOVA
12		FIJ	Darshik SINGH
13		FIJ	Inia RAMAKULU

No.	Pos.	Nation	Player
14		FIJ	Kavneel LAL
15		FIJ	Marika MATANI
16		FIJ	Sahil KUMAR (captain)
17		FIJ	Peni BAULI
18		FIJ	Shanav KUMAR
19		FIJ	Laisenia VEISEYAKI
20		FIJ	Paula KIDIA
21		FIJ	Keshav CHAND
22		FIJ	Aporosa NABULEWAKULA
23		FIJ	Asereti NASEI
24		FIJ	Kaiava MADUMUALOLO
25		FIJ	Suliasi DAUVOSA
26		FIJ	Waisea CARABULA

== Personnel ==
=== Current technical staff ===
Position	Staff
President	(Fiji) Ram Naresh
Vice President	(Fiji) Joji Rider
Secretary	(Fiji) Pranit Pravikash Chand
Treasurer	(Fiji) Ritesh Chand
Head coach	(Fiji) Tetu Ravana
Team manager	(Fiji) Jay Kumar
Club Ambassador	(Fiji) Watakini Taqa
Board members	(Fiji) Mohammed Ayub (Fiji) Vikesh Rikneel Prasad (Fiji) Vishal Prasad (Fiji) Rishal Prasad (Fiji) Divendra Prasad (Fiji) Ritendra Prasad

Last updated: 20 October 2022
Source: FBC TV

== Achievements ==
- Vodafone Senior League - Vanua Levu Zone: 2

Winner: 2016, 2020, 2021

- Inter-District Championship - Second Division: 3

Winner: 1973, 1977, 2022,2023
Runner-up: 2020, 2026
Fair Play Team: 2020

- Fiji FA President's Cup: 1

Winner: 2024,
Fair Play Team: 2024

== See also ==
- Fiji Football Association
- 2020 Vodafone Senior League
- Fiji Senior League

== Bibliography ==
- M. Prasad, Sixty Years of Soccer in Fiji 1938 – 1998: The Official History of the Fiji Football Association, Fiji Football Association, Suva, 1998.
