= Taveuni F.C. =

Fijian football club

- Full name: Taveuni Football Club
- Founded: 1947
- Ground: Waiyevo Ground
- Capacity: 1000
- Chairman: TBA
- Manager: TBA
- League: Fiji Senior League (Second Tier)
- 2019: TBA
Home colours

Taveuni F.C. is a Fijian football team playing in the second division of the Fiji Football Association competitions. It is based on the island of Taveuni.

Their uniform includes gold and black shirt.

== History ==
The Taveuni Soccer Association was formed in 1947, under the presidency of A. Dayaram.

== Current squad ==
Squad for the 2018 Inter-District Championship

Note: Flags indicate national team as defined under FIFA eligibility rules; some limited exceptions apply. Players may hold more than one non-FIFA nationality.

No.	Pos.	Nation	Player
1	GK	(Fiji) FIJ	EMORI RAKABOA
2		(Fiji) FIJ	VIJENDRA KUMAR
3		(Fiji) FIJ	ABDIL ZAKIM ALI
4		(Fiji) FIJ	ABDUL IFRAN
5		(Fiji) FIJ	MOSESE GADAI
6		(Fiji) FIJ	SANJESH NARAYAN
7	DF	(Fiji) FIJ	SHAILENDRA BUISENA
8		(Fiji) FIJ	LENATI TUKANIA
9	FW	(Fiji) FIJ	RAJNESH KUMAR
10		(Fiji) FIJ	SHANEEL SANJESH KUMAR
11		(Fiji) FIJ	SHIEK SULTAN

No.	Pos.	Nation	Player
12		(Fiji) FIJ	NALINESH REDDY
13	DF	(Fiji) FIJ	AMIT KAHNAIYA
14		(Fiji) FIJ	NAVINESH AKAH CHAND
15		(Fiji) FIJ	IRFAN HUSSEIN
16		(Fiji) FIJ	RAVNEET GOUNDAR
17		(Fiji) FIJ	ATISH KUMAR
18		(Fiji) FIJ	ALIPATE NAWAITABU
19		(Fiji) FIJ	MOHAMMED FAHEEM
20		(Fiji) FIJ	VIRENDRA CHAND
21		(Fiji) FIJ	FREDRICK BULL JUNIOR

== See also ==
- Fiji Football Association

== Bibliography ==
- M. Prasad, Sixty Years of Soccer in Fiji 1938–1998: The Official History of the Fiji Football Association, Fiji Football Association, Suva, 1998.
