= Rakiraki F.C. =

Fijian football club

- Full name: Rakiraki Football Club
- Founded: 1938
- Ground: Ra Sports Ground; Rakiraki, Fiji
- Capacity: 1,000
- Chairman: (Fiji)
- League: Fiji Senior League (Second Tier)
- 2019: TBA
Home colours

Rakiraki F.C. is a Fijian football team playing in the second division of the Fiji Football Association competitions. It is based in Rakiraki, which is situated on the northern side of the main island of Viti Levu. Their home stadium is the Ra Sports Ground, which has a capacity of 1,000. Their uniform is maroon shirt, white shorts and maroon socks.

== History ==
Rakiraki F.C. was founded in 1938, with the formation of the Rakiraki Football Association, under the leadership of Edward Raman. It first took part in the Inter-District Competition (IDC) held in Lautoka in 1939, in which it was resoundingly defeated by Suva, in its first game, by nine goals to nil. In 1944, Rakiraki hosted the IDC for the only time. It reached the zenith of its performance when it surprised the other teams to qualify for the 1951 IDC final, which it lost to Suva by two goals to nil. Unlike the other football teams from the western division, Rakiraki performed poorly in the 1970s and 1980s, but it improved in the 1990s and created history in 2003 to win its first IDC in the senior division, winning again in 2004, 2006 and 2007. In the 2003 IDC, held in Govind Park, Rakiraki defeated T/Naitasiri 2–0. In that year Rakiraki had players like Ritesh, Farid, Atinesh, Ganga, Raju, Semi, Robin, Aeseli, Shiu, Shameel Hussein, Shameer, Tevita, Vikash, Atish and was coached by Pragdeesh Gounder (Putty). The team manager was Sani Ram (Sannu) and officials comprised Mohd Rafiq, Kamal Chand Seth, Shaneel, Atesh Maharaj and chairman Sanjeet Maharaj.

== Current squad ==
Squad for the 2018 Inter-District Championship

Note: Flags indicate national team as defined under FIFA eligibility rules; some limited exceptions apply. Players may hold more than one non-FIFA nationality.

No.	Pos.	Nation	Player
1	GK	(Fiji) FIJ	TEVITA DRIKALU
2	DF	(Fiji) FIJ	AKEI ULIBAU
3		(Fiji) FIJ	EMMANUEL MOSES
4	FW	(Fiji) FIJ	NIMILOTE AMINI
5	MF	(Fiji) FIJ	ZAINAL HUSSEIN
6		(Fiji) FIJ	ASHNAL SETH
7	MF	(Fiji) FIJ	JOSEPH ELDER
8	MF	(Fiji) FIJ	ASEILI COMBUTA
9	MF	(Fiji) FIJ	SHAHEEL GOUNDAR
10	MF	(Fiji) FIJ	JOHNNY RAO
11	MF	(Fiji) FIJ	RONALD LAWRENCE

No.	Pos.	Nation	Player
12		(Fiji) FIJ	NAFIZ ALI
13		(Fiji) FIJ	VISHAL NAIR
14		(Fiji) FIJ	ILI TOMASI BUSA
15		(Fiji) FIJ	PRAVIKASH CHAND
16	MF	(Fiji) FIJ	ILI GAUNAVOU JNR
17		(Fiji) FIJ	OSEA ROQICA
18		(Fiji) FIJ	RONALD DUTT
19		(Fiji) FIJ	ROBERT NAIR
20	MF	(Fiji) FIJ	SHIEK SHAMIN
21	MF	(Fiji) FIJ	ELVIS RAJU
22	GK	(Fiji) FIJ	SAIMONI NAIDOGI

== Achievements ==
- League Championship (for Districts):

Winner: 4 2003, 2004, 2006, 2007
Runner-up: 3 2002, 2005, 2008

- Inter-District Championship:

Winner: 4 2003, 2004, 2006, 2007
Runner-up: 1 1951

- Battle of the Giants:

Winner: 0
Runner-up: 0

- Fiji Football Association Cup Tournament:

Winner: 0
Runner-up: 0

== See also ==
- Fiji Football Association
