= Savusavu F.C. =

Fijian football club

- Full name: Savusavu Football Club
- Founded: 1959
- Ground: Ganilau Park (GWB)
- Capacity: 1000
- Chairman: TBA
- Manager: TBA
- League: Fiji Senior League (Second Tier)
- 2019: TBA
Home colours

Savusavu F.C. is a Fijian football team playing in the second division of the Fiji Football Association competitions. It is based in Savusavu, which is a situated on the southern side of the island of Vanua Levu.

Their uniform includes white shirt with black trim.

== History ==
The Savusavu Soccer Association was formed in 1959, under the presidency of Kup Sami. In season 2002, the team made the Second Division Inter-District Cup Final in Ba at Govind Park and beat Tailevu-Naitasiri 1-0.

In 2009, the team made the Final of the Northern Zone League with the following scores in the final played over two legs - First Leg [November 29, Ratu Cakobau Park, Nausori] Tailevu-Naitasiri 2 Savusavu 3, Second Leg [December 6, Ganilau Park, Savusavu] Savusavu 3 Tailevu-Naitasiri 0 giving them an aggregate score of 6-2.

This win allowed Savusavu to qualify for a promotion-relegation play-off against First Division Nasinu F.C.; again it would be decided over two legs which went as follows - First Leg [December 13, Ratu Cakobau Park, Nausori] Nasinu F.C. 2 Savusavu 1 [Aldrine Kilua 7, Nitan Kumar 17; David Matavesi ~50], and the Second Leg (December 19, Ganilau Park, Savusavu) Savusavu 1 Nasinu F.C. 2 [Imroz Rahim 49; Nitan Kumar 44, 79] overall losing the game 4-2 on aggregate meaning they stay in the second tier. (Sunday 4 April 2010 - GWB)

Savusavu qualified for the Super Premier Division after defeating Nasinu in the 2010 promotion/relegation playoffs. The team finished 7th in its inaugural season. In 2012, after successive poor results the administration of Jabid Hussein, coach Billy Hussein and their compatriots resigned from their respective posts midway through the season. They had just one draw to boast of after 9 games as the team lied bottom of the table with 1 point.

The team is currently under Gopen Narayan's presidency assisted by Hari Dutt Sharma who is the VP. The new team has brought back Manoj Lal as coach, a move that was widely applauded by the Savusavu public. Former national captain Tony Kabakoro is assisting him as technical adviser. The new management have also brought back hometown heroes Thomas Vulivuli who is also the current captain and Pene Erenio from Suva and Navua respectively. Their return along with the signing of Labasa legend Waisale Rasoki has brought vast improvements in the Savusavu side as they remain unbeaten in their last 4 games with wins over Rewa and a crushing defeat of Labasa. The side has also seen the return of midfield ace David Fong Toy who has been absent from the soccer scene for a couple of years. Other notable names in the team include former national 7s rep Kitione Kamikamica along with Roderick Kumar, Epeli Deyama, Akuila Bulewa, George Singh and Naveendra Deo Jerry.

== Current squad ==
Squad for the 2018 Inter-District Championship

Note: Flags indicate national team as defined under FIFA eligibility rules; some limited exceptions apply. Players may hold more than one non-FIFA nationality.

No.	Pos.	Nation	Player
1	GK	(Fiji) FIJ	DEVE VUWAI
2		(Fiji) FIJ	LAL JASNIL
3		(Fiji) FIJ	RIYAZ ALI
4		(Fiji) FIJ	WAISEA DRAUNA
5	MF	(Fiji) FIJ	Pene Erenio
6		(Fiji) FIJ	IOBE WAQALIVALIVA
7		(Fiji) FIJ	JONASA BULINAYAU
8		(Fiji) FIJ	PRASAD SHAVNEEL
9		(Fiji) FIJ	TEBA IOWANE
10		(Fiji) FIJ	ASAELI HERITAGE
11	DF	(Fiji) FIJ	NEMANI KANACAGI

No.	Pos.	Nation	Player
12		(Fiji) FIJ	SALESH NAIDU
13		(Fiji) FIJ	RATU DRAUNA
14		(Fiji) FIJ	THOMAS KUMAR
15		(Fiji) FIJ	IOWANE SIGARARA
16		(Fiji) FIJ	KASHNIL PRASAD
17		(Fiji) FIJ	AMITISAI VUWAI
18		(Fiji) FIJ	ILIAVI KATONITABUA
19		(Fiji) FIJ	AVISHEK CHAND
20		(Fiji) FIJ	ROZAL HUSSEIN
21		(Fiji) FIJ	MARIKA SERUKALOU
22		(Fiji) FIJ	KAAIR KHAN

== See also ==
- Fiji Football Association

== Bibliography ==
- M. Prasad, Sixty Years of Soccer in Fiji 1938 – 1998: The Official History of the Fiji Football Association, Fiji Football Association, Suva, 1998.
