= Nasinu F.C. =

Fijian football club

- Full name: Football Club Nasinu
- Nicknames: "Minnows" and “Giant Killers”
- Founded: 1976
- Ground: Nasinu Park; Nasinu, Fiji
- Capacity: 1,000
- Chairman: (Fiji) Sadasivan Naicker
- Manager: (Fiji) Kamal Prasad Bula
- League: National Football League (Fiji)
- 2025: 8th
Home colours

Nasinu F.C. is a Fijian football team playing in the first division of the Fiji Football Association competitions. It is based in Nasinu, which is situated on the eastern side of the main island of Viti Levu, between the town of Nausori and the city of Suva. Their home stadium is Rishikul College Grounds. Their uniform is blue shirt, maroon shorts and blue socks. The club lost to Savusavu F.C in promotion and relegation 2010.

== History ==
Nasinu F.A. was founded in 1976, with the formation of the Nasinu Football Association, to cater for the expanding population of the Nasinu area. Its first president was Subhas Maharaj. The team began its debut in the second division but soon moved up to the first division, where it has performed credibly. In 1995–96 Nasinu was coached by ex-English professional player Terry O'Donnell, who was also previously the successful Vanuatu National coach. Despite being in the last place of the national league and facing relegation in 1995 when he took over, the team performed admirably under O'Donnell to win the last 6 games and force a promotion-relegation playoff with Savusavu FC, which it won convincingly. The next season the club climbed the league Table to finish a credible 4th and also became runner-up in the IDC.

== Current squad ==
Squad for 2020 Fiji Premier League

Note: Flags indicate national team as defined under FIFA eligibility rules; some limited exceptions apply. Players may hold more than one non-FIFA nationality.

No.	Pos.	Nation	Player
1	GK	FIJ	Epeli Loaniceva
2	MF	FIJ	Faizal Ali
3	MF	SOL	Jared Rongosulia
4	MF	FIJ	Waisiki Ravouvou
5	DF	FIJ	Daniel Dass
6	MF	FIJ	Shahil Kumar
7	DF	FIJ	Prashant Chand
8	MF	FIJ	Manit Lal
9	DF	FIJ	Nasoni Mereke
10	FW	FIJ	Jone Koro
11	DF	FIJ	Abhishay Kumar

No.	Pos.	Nation	Player
12	DF	FIJ	Tomasi Uculoa
13	FW	SOL	Atkin Kaua
14	FW	FIJ	Alvish Ram
15	FW	FIJ	Jone Naraba
16	FW	FIJ	Asaeli Tunidau
17	MF	FIJ	Luke Savu
18	MF	FIJ	Robert Rabici
19	MF	FIJ	Jope Naivalu
20	DF	FIJ	Sekove Naivakananumi
21	GK	FIJ	Viliame Sivo
22	GK	FIJ	Meli Bavatu

== Personnel ==
=== Current technical staff ===
Position	Staff
Head coach	(Fiji) Shivam Nathan

== Achievements ==
- League Championship (for Districts): :Winner: 0 :Runner-up: 0
- Inter-District Championship: :Winner: 1990 :Runner-up: 1988, 1993, 1996
- Battle of the Giants: :Winner: 0 :Runner-up: 1989, 1991
- Fiji Football Association Cup Tournament: :Winner: 0 :Runner-up: 2002

== See also ==
- Fiji Football Association

== Bibliography ==
- M. Prasad, Sixty Years of Soccer in Fiji 1938 – 1998: The Official History of the Fiji Football Association, Fiji Football Association, Suva, 1998.
