= Nadogo F.C. =

Fijian football club

- Full name: Nadogo Football Club
- Nickname: The Green Hornets
- Founded: 1960
- Ground: Nadogo Central College Ground
- Capacity: 350
- Chairman: (Fiji) C.B SINAH
- Manager: TBA
- League: Fiji Senior League (Second Tier)
- 2019: TBA
Home colours

Nadogo F.C. is a Fijian football team playing in the second division of the Fiji Football Association competitions. It is based in Wainikoro, which is situated on the island of Vanua Levu.

Their uniform includes olive green shirt.

== See also ==
- Fiji Football Association

== Bibliography ==
- M. Prasad, Sixty Years of Soccer in Fiji 1938 – 1998: The Official History of the Fiji Football Association, Fiji Football Association, Suva, 1998.
