= Seaqaqa F.C. =

Fijian football club

Seaqaqa F.A.
- Full name: Seaqaqa Football Association
- Founded: 1981
- Ground: Seaqaqa Muslim Primary School Ground
- Capacity: 1000
- Chairman: Lakhan Kumran
- Manager: Mohammed Imran
- League: Fiji Premier League (First Tier)
- 2026: 1st (won play-offs and promoted)
Home colours

Seaqaqa F.C. is a Fijian football team playing in the second division of the Fiji Football Association competitions. It is based in Seaqaqa, which is a situated on the northern side of the island of Vanua Levu.

Their uniform includes navy blue shirt and shorts and black shorts.

== History ==
The Seaqaqa Soccer Association was formed in 1981, under the presidency of Kampta Prasad. The Soccer District is based in small developing town Natua Sugar farming Area.

After that this District was in good hands of Mr Brij Mohan, Mr Lakhan Kumar, Mr. Tahir Khan and Mr. Zailab Dean, This district had 10 club teams.

Seaqaqa soccer has produced some of best footballers in Fiji who have represented the National Team or even are till playing for the some of premier districts .To name few, e.g. Satish Kumar (Bladder), Oliver Dyer, Kasimiro Dinono, Henry Dyer, Late Jovilisi Golea, Ajmat Begg, Praneel Kumar Sharma (Jumman), Laisiasa Bond and Jovilisi Rara.

Seaqaqa soccer has played in 2 IDC finals in year 1994, 1995 and in many semi-finals. In years 1991 till 2000 this District was doing very well in Fiji FA Calendar.

Seaqaqa promoted to the Fiji Premier League for the first time in 2026.

== See also ==
- Fiji Football Association

== Bibliography ==
- M. Prasad, Sixty Years of Soccer in Fiji 1938 – 1998: The Official History of the Fiji Football Association, Fiji Football Association, Suva, 1998.
