= Tailevu Naitasiri F.C. =

Fijian football club

- Full name: Tailevu Naitasiri Football Club
- Founded: 1941
- Ground: Ratu Cakobau Park; Nausori, Fiji
- Capacity: 8,000
- Chairman: (Fiji) Sundeep Roy
- Manager: (Nigeria) Victor Oshismen
- League: Fiji Premier League
- 2024: 10th in Premier League (relegated)
Home colours

Tailevu Naitasiri F.C. is a Fijian football team playing in the second division of the Fiji Football Association competitions. It is based in Nausori, which is a town on the island of Viti Levu, and about 20 kilometers north of the capital, Suva. Their home stadium is Ratu Cakobau Park. Their uniform includes sky blue shirt, white shorts and blue socks.

== History ==
The Tailevu Naitasiri Football Association was formed in 1941, when some local clubs split from Rewa to form their own association.

== Current squad ==
Squad for the [Fiji senior league#2021 FSL |2021 Fiji Senior League ]

Note: Flags indicate national team as defined under FIFA eligibility rules; some limited exceptions apply. Players may hold more than one non-FIFA nationality.

No.	Pos.	Nation	Player
1	GK	FIJ	Zaid Ali
4	DF	FIJ	Viliame Bawai
6	DF	FIJ	Waisea Nagonelevu
9	FW	FIJ	Jone Salauneune
18	DF	FIJ	Ratu Meli Tabuaniqili

== Former players ==
- (Fiji) Adi Bakaniceva

== See also ==
- Fiji Football Association

== Bibliography ==
- M. Prasad, Sixty Years of Soccer in Fiji 1938–1998: The Official History of the Fiji Football Association, Fiji Football Association, Suva, 1998.
