= Tavua F.C. =

Fijian football club

Tavua
- Full name: Tavua Football Club
- Nickname: Gold Miners
- Founded: 1942
- Ground: Garvey Park; Tavua, Fiji
- Capacity: 4,500
- Manager: Nazeel Ali
- League: Fiji Senior League
- 2025: 10th Fiji Premier League (relegated)

Tavua F.C. (for Football Club) is a Fijian association football club playing in the second division of the Fiji Football Association competitions. It is based in Tavua. Their home stadium is Garvey Park.

== History ==
Tavua F.C. was founded in 1942, with the formation of Tavua Football Association, under the leadership of James Naidu. The team languished in the second division has moved up to the first division, and has performed credibly in recent times. However in 2012 they relegated again, but they managed to come back for the 2018 season

== Achievements ==
- League Championship (for Districts): 0
- Senior League (for districts) - Second Tier: 1

Winner: 2017

- Inter-District Championship: 1

Winner: 1995

- Battle of the Giants: 0

Runner-up: 1996, 1999

- Fiji Football Association Cup Tournament: 1

Winner: 1994
Runner-up: 1993

== See also ==
- Fiji Football Association

== Bibliography ==
- M. Prasad, Sixty Years of Soccer in Fiji 1938–1998: The Official History of the Fiji Football Association, Fiji Football Association, Suva, 1998.
