= Dreketi F.C. =

Fijian football club

Coordinates: 16°46′45.897″S 179°45′0.63″W

- Full name: Dreketi Football Club
- Founded: 1995
- Ground: Subrail Park
- Capacity: 10,000
- Chairman: (Fiji) Roneel Ram
- Manager: Vacant
- League: National Football League
- 2018: 8th (relegated to 2019 Fiji Senior League (Second Tier))
Home colours

Dreketi F.C. is a Fijian football team based in Labasa playing in the Senior Division of the Fiji Football Association competitions. Dreketi is a district in the Province of Macuata which is on the island of Vanua Levu in Fiji. The team is currently playing in the National Football League.

== History ==
The Dreketi Soccer Association was formed in 1995, under the presidency of Prem Chand. The team was coached by Johan Leewai Till 2018, After he moved to Labasa F.C.

== Current squad ==
As of 9 October 2018

Note: Flags indicate national team as defined under FIFA eligibility rules; some limited exceptions apply. Players may hold more than one non-FIFA nationality.

No.	Pos.	Nation	Player
2		FIJ	Imanuel Prasad
8	MF	FIJ	Ratu Batirerega
9	FW	FIJ	Joseva Bolakievi
10	DF	FIJ	Joel Shelvin Prasad
11	MF	FIJ	Thomas Vulivuli
13	MF	FIJ	Setareki Raiole
14	MF	FIJ	Rusiate Doidoi
15	MF	FIJ	Shoel Khan
16	MF	FIJ	Sailasa Vosaicake
18	MF	FIJ	Sakuisa Rakoso

No.	Pos.	Nation	Player
20	GK	FIJ	Benidito Caginiveisaqa
—	GK	FIJ	Ratu Wawatabua
—	DF	FIJ	Krishneel Krishna
—		FIJ	Osea Lautiki
—	DF	FIJ	Turendran Kumar
—	DF	FIJ	Mohammed Issac
—	MF	FIJ	Mohammed Haroon
—	MF	FIJ	Prashneel Nand

== See also ==
- Fiji Football Association

== Bibliography ==
- M. Prasad, Sixty Years of Soccer in Fiji 1938 – 1998: The Official History of the Fiji Football Association, Fiji Football Association, Suva, 1998.
