= Subrail Park =

Football stadium in Labasa, Fiji

Coordinates: 16°25′39″S 179°22′28″E

Subrail Park is a stadium in Labasa (pronounced "lum-ba-sa") on the island of Vanua Levu in Fiji. The stadium is owned and managed by Labasa Town Council. The stadium has a capacity of 10,000 people at any event. It is the home of Labasa FC and Dreketi. It also hosts rugby union matches, such as the Colonial Cup and the Digicel Cup. It has been damaged during Tropical Cyclone Winston.

== History ==
The property on which Subrail Park is situated, was donated in the 1900s by the Subrail family for the sole and specific purpose of a park to benefit the people of Labasa. Mr. Subrail, the founder, was a well known businessman in Labasa who held various leadership positions and foundered many businesses, such as a vehicle dealership and the Elite theater which was the only cinema in Labasa town for the longest time. Mr. Subrail has placed a major positive impact on developments through his influence. Apart from being known as the President of the Labasa Club, he has also held numerous positions in NGO's and clubs which promote humanitarian activities. While the Fijian Government contributes to the upgrading and maintenance of the park, the Subrail family continues to hold a special interest in the welfare and administrative matters of the park. The surviving beneficiaries of the Subrail Estate include Mr. Pavan Subrail, Mr. Atil Anand, Mr. Vikash Lal, Mr. Veenen Chand, Mr. Bhavick Lal, Ms. Shirlene Lal, Ms. Seema Lal, Ms. Vinita Chand, Mr. Shane Veenen Chand, Mr. Jason Aditya Chand, Mr. Kris Chand, Ms. Cynthia Deviyani Chand, Ms. Saanvi Subrail and Ms. Demira Subrail.
