= Football at the 2019 Pacific Games – Men's team squads =

The 2019 Pacific Games men's football tournament is an international football tournament held in Samoa from 8 – 20 July 2019. The eleven national teams involved in the tournament were required to register a squad of maximum 23 players; only players in these squads were eligible to take part in the tournament. New Zealand registered with an under-23 squad.

The age listed for each player is on 8 July 2019, the first day of the tournament. The nationality for each club reflects the national association (not the league) to which the club is affiliated. A flag is included for coaches that are of a different nationality than their own national team.

== Group A ==
=== New Zealand U-23 ===
Head coach: (England) Des Buckingham

The final squad was announced on 1 July 2019.

No.	Pos.	Player	Date of birth (age)	Club
1	GK	Cameron Brown	9 July 1999 (aged 19)	(New Zealand Football) Central United
2	DF	Jordan Spain	5 March 2000 (aged 19)	(New Zealand Football) Cashmere Technical
3	DF	Sean Liddicoat	14 May 1997 (aged 22)	(New Zealand Football) Coastal Spirit
4	DF	Robert Tipelu	4 October 1999 (aged 19)	(New Zealand Football) Onehunga Sports
5	MF	Billy Jones	1 May 1998 (aged 21)	(United States Soccer Federation) UNLV Rebels
6	MF	Dane Schnell	14 May 1999 (aged 20)	(New Zealand Football) Western Springs
7	FW	Ollie Whyte	20 January 2000 (aged 19)	(Portuguese Football Federation) Rio Ave
8	MF	Lachie McIsaac	8 January 1998 (aged 21)	(New Zealand Football) Birkenhead United
9	FW	Logan Rogerson	28 May 1998 (aged 21)	(German Football Association) Carl Zeiss Jena
10	FW	Seth Clark	22 September 2000 (aged 18)	(New Zealand Football) Cashmere Technical
11	MF	Jake Porter	19 November 1997 (aged 21)	(New Zealand Football) Onehunga Sports
12	GK	Conor Tracey	13 April 1997 (aged 22)	(New Zealand Football) Central United
13	DF	Jackson Brady	30 June 1997 (aged 22)	(New Zealand Football) Christchurch United
14	DF	Jorge Akers	3 March 2000 (aged 19)	(New Zealand Football) Miramar Rangers
15	FW	Ihaia Delaney	12 January 1999 (aged 20)	(New Zealand Football) Western Suburbs
16	MF	Stafford Dowling	1 January 1999 (aged 20)	(New Zealand Football) Onehunga Sports
17	MF	Sean Cooper	16 October 1998 (aged 20)	(New Zealand Football) Onehunga Sports
18	DF	Dylan de Jong	28 September 1997 (aged 21)	(New Zealand Football) Eastern Suburbs
19	FW	Byron Heath	1 January 1999 (aged 20)	(New Zealand Football) Lower Hutt City
20	GK	Ellis Hare-Reid	12 January 1999 (aged 20)	(Scottish Football Association) Ayr United

=== Papua New Guinea ===
Head coach: Bob Morris

The final squad was announced on 12 June 2019.

No.	Pos.	Player	Date of birth (age)	Caps	Goals	Club
1	GK	Ishmael Pole	25 January 1993 (aged 26)	0	0	(Papua New Guinea Football Association) Hekari United
2	DF	Daniel Joe	29 May 1990 (aged 29)	12	0	(Papua New Guinea Football Association) Hekari United
3	DF	Joshua Talau	19 April 1996 (aged 23)	1	0	(Papua New Guinea Football Association) Toti City Dwellers
4	DF	Alwin Komolong	2 November 1994 (aged 24)	12	0	(German Football Association) Fortuna Köln
5	DF	Felix Komolong	6 March 1997 (aged 22)	12	0	(United States Soccer Federation) Northern Kentucky Norse
6	MF	Patrick Aisa	6 July 1994 (aged 25)	8	2	(Papua New Guinea Football Association) Hekari United
7	FW	Raymond Gunemba	4 June 1986 (aged 33)	17	9	(Papua New Guinea Football Association) Toti City Dwellers
8	MF	Michael Foster	5 September 1985 (aged 33)	23	7	(Papua New Guinea Football Association) Toti City Dwellers
9	FW	Nigel Dabinyaba	26 October 1992 (aged 26)	13	6	(Papua New Guinea Football Association) Toti City Dwellers
10	FW	David Browne	27 December 1995 (aged 23)	3	0	(New Zealand Football) Auckland City
11	FW	Ati Kepo	15 January 1996 (aged 23)	0	0	(Papua New Guinea Football Association) Hekari United
12	DF	Shane Sakael	31 December 1992 (aged 26)	0	0	(Papua New Guinea Football Association) Hekari United
13	FW	Tommy Semmy	30 September 1994 (aged 24)	10	3	(New Zealand Football) Hamilton Wanderers
14	MF	Emmanuel Simon	25 December 1992 (aged 26)	13	0	(Papua New Guinea Football Association) Toti City Dwellers
15	DF	Dinniget Luaine	16 May 2000 (aged 19)	0	0	(Papua New Guinea Football Association) Besta PNG United
16	FW	Jonathan Allen	3 January 2000 (aged 19)	0	0	(Papua New Guinea Football Association) Besta PNG United
17	MF	Jacob Sabua	25 August 1994 (aged 24)	11	0	(Papua New Guinea Football Association) Toti City Dwellers
18	MF	Gregory Togubai	22 March 1998 (aged 21)	0	0	(Papua New Guinea Football Association) Eastern Stars
19	DF	Koriak Upaiga	13 June 1987 (aged 32)	14	1	(Papua New Guinea Football Association) Hekari United
20	GK	Ronald Warisan	20 September 1989 (aged 29)	13	0	(Papua New Guinea Football Association) Toti City Dwellers
21	FW	Alex Kamen	26 August 1993 (aged 25)	0	0	(Papua New Guinea Football Association) Morobe United
22	MF	Kolu Kepo	15 June 1993 (aged 26)	1	0	(Papua New Guinea Football Association) Hekari United
23	DF	Langarap Samol	21 July 1989 (aged 29)	0	0	(Papua New Guinea Football Association) Kagua-Erave

=== Samoa ===
Head coach: Paul Ualesi

The final squad was announced on 10 June 2019.

No.	Pos.	Player	Date of birth (age)	Caps	Goals	Club
1	GK	Faalavelave Matagi	13 March 1997 (aged 22)	3	0	(Football Federation Samoa) Vaitele-Uta
2	MF	Keone Kapisi	19 April 1994 (aged 25)	2	0	(United States Soccer Federation) BYU Cougars
3	DF	Tauati Tanoa'i	19 April 1998 (aged 21)	0	0	(Football Federation Samoa) Lupe o le Soaga
4	DF	Kevin Daniells	19 May 1999 (aged 20)	0	0	(Football Australia) Innisfail United
5	DF	Faitalia Hamilton-Pama	17 May 1993 (aged 26)	3	1	(New Zealand Football) Central United
6	DF	Andrew Setefano	10 August 1987 (aged 31)	11	0	(Football Federation Samoa) Vailima Kiwi
7	FW	Lapalapa Toni	7 April 1994 (aged 25)	4	0	(Football Federation Samoa) Lupe o le Soaga
8	MF	George Konusi	11 January 1990 (aged 29)	0	0	(New Zealand Football) Manukau United
9	MF	Va'a Taualai	4 June 1998 (aged 21)	0	0	(Football Federation Samoa) Lupe o le Soaga
10	MF	Andrew Mobberley	10 March 1992 (aged 27)	6	2	(New Zealand Football) Albany United
11	DF	Vito Laloata	15 October 1996 (aged 22)	1	0	(Football Federation Samoa) Lupe o le Soaga
12	FW	Mike Saofaiga	12 January 1991 (aged 28)	10	0	(Football Federation Samoa) Lepea FC
13	MF	Willie Sauiluma	12 July 2000 (aged 18)	0	0	(Football Australia) Goulburn Valley Suns
14	FW	Darren Talilai	23 October 1995 (aged 23)	0	0	(Football Federation Samoa) Lupe o le Soaga
15	FW	Thomas Konusi	11 June 1996 (aged 23)	0	0	(New Zealand Football) Mount Albert-Ponsonby
16	DF	Harlene Russell	27 March 2000 (aged 19)	0	0	(New Zealand Football) Glenfield Rovers
17	MF	Jarvis Filimalae	20 April 2003 (aged 16)	0	0	(Football Federation Samoa) Vailima Kiwi
18	FW	John Tumua Leo	15 January 2003 (aged 16)	0	0	(Football Federation Samoa) Vaipuna
19	DF	Sean Atherton	24 September 1999 (aged 19)	0	0	(New Zealand Football) Oratia United
20	DF	Lawrie Letutusa	11 June 1993 (aged 26)	1	0	(Football Federation Samoa) Lupe o le Soaga
21	MF	Ritchievoy Ueligitone	6 July 1994 (aged 25)	0	0	(Football Federation Samoa) Goldstar Sogi
22	GK	Matthew Johnston	5 November 1987 (aged 31)	0	0	(New Zealand Football) Mount Albert-Ponsonby
23	GK	Eti Fatu	25 February 2001 (aged 18)	0	0	(Football Federation Samoa) Vailima Kiwi

=== Tonga ===
Head coach: Timote Moleni

No.	Pos.	Player	Date of birth (age)	Caps	Goals	Club
1	GK	Mahe Malafu	24 February 1998 (aged 21)	4	0	(Tonga Football Association) Veitongo
2	DF	O'faloto Kite	26 April 2000 (aged 19)	0	0	(Tonga Football Association) Veitongo
3	FW	Pita Huni	25 February 2001 (aged 18)	0	0	(Tonga Football Association) Lotohaʻapai United
4	DF	Siuloa Fahina	1 April 1994 (aged 25)	5	0	(Tonga Football Association)
5	FW	Timote Fakasi'i'eiki	30 April 1997 (aged 22)	0	0	(Tonga Football Association) Lotohaʻapai United
6	MF	Kamaliele Papani	8 April 1985 (aged 34)	10	0	(Tonga Football Association) Lotohaʻapai United
7	MF	Vai Lutu	30 September 1999 (aged 19)	5	0	(Tonga Football Association) Lotohaʻapai United
8	DF	Sione Uhatahi	15 September 1988 (aged 30)	11	1	(Tonga Football Association) Lotohaʻapai United
9	DF	Soeli Fakahafua	18 July 2000 (aged 18)	0	0	(Tonga Football Association)
10	FW	Hema Polovili	27 July 1997 (aged 21)	8	1	(Tonga Football Association) Lotohaʻapai United
11	MF	Tuia Falepapalangi	15 July 2000 (aged 18)	0	0	(Tonga Football Association) Lotohaʻapai United
12	GK	Semisi Otukolo	23 June 1999 (aged 20)	2	0	(Tonga Football Association) Lotohaʻapai United
13	MF	Laulea Taufa	14 July 1999 (aged 19)	5	0	(Tonga Football Association) Lotohaʻapai United
14	MF	Sitaleki Fisi	11 February 2000 (aged 19)	0	0	(Tonga Football Association) Lotohaʻapai United
15	DF	Lachman 'Atoa	5 December 1998 (aged 20)	0	0	(Tonga Football Association)
17	GK	David Anau	4 June 1999 (aged 20)	0	0	(Tonga Football Association) Lotohaʻapai United
19	MF	Fineasi Palei	20 May 1989 (aged 30)	7	0	(Tonga Football Association) Marist Prems
20	GK	Sinilau Taufa	10 February 1995 (aged 24)	2	0	(Tonga Football Association) Lotohaʻapai United

=== Vanuatu ===
Head coach: (Northern Ireland) Paul Munster

The final squad was announced on 22 May 2019.

No.	Pos.	Player	Date of birth (age)	Caps	Goals	Club
1	GK	Chikau Mansale	13 January 1983 (aged 36)	21	0	(Vanuatu Football Federation) Tupuji Imere
2	DF	Brian Kaltak	30 September 1993 (aged 25)	19	4	(New Zealand Football) Auckland City
3	DF	Jason Thomas	20 January 1997 (aged 22)	14	0	(Papua New Guinea Football Association) Hekari United
4	DF	Joseph Iaruel	25 January 1998 (aged 21)	10	0	(Vanuatu Football Federation) ABM Galaxy
5	DF	Jeffery Bob	1 July 1992 (aged 27)	4	2	(Vanuatu Football Federation) Amicale
6	DF	Gordshem Dona	27 August 1996 (aged 22)	8	0	(Vanuatu Football Federation) Amicale
7	MF	John Alick	25 April 1991 (aged 28)	9	0	(Solomon Islands Football Federation) Solomon Warriors
8	MF	Ronaldo Wilkins	30 December 1999 (aged 19)	6	0	(Vanuatu Football Federation) Shepherds United
9	FW	Kensi Tangis	20 January 1990 (aged 29)	25	8	(Solomon Islands Football Federation) Solomon Warriors
10	MF	Mitch Cooper	18 September 1994 (aged 24)	2	0	(Football Australia) Hume City
11	FW	Andre Batick	28 April 1993 (aged 26)	3	0	(Vanuatu Football Federation) Malampa Revivors
12	FW	Azariah Soromon	1 March 1999 (aged 20)	10	7	(New Zealand Football) Southern United
13	MF	Daniel Natou	25 November 1989 (aged 29)	9	0	(Papua New Guinea Football Association) Hekari United
14	MF	Elkington Molivakarua	3 March 1993 (aged 26)	9	2	(Vanuatu Football Federation) Tafea
15	FW	Tony Kaltak	5 November 1996 (aged 22)	12	6	(Vanuatu Football Federation) Erakor Golden Star
16	MF	Bong Kalo	18 January 1997 (aged 22)	16	1	(Fiji Football Association) Lautoka
17	MF	Bill Nicholls	3 June 1993 (aged 26)	6	1	(New Caledonian Football Federation) AS Magenta
18	DF	Selwyn Vatu	13 June 1998 (aged 21)	9	0	(Vanuatu Football Federation) Shepherds United
19	DF	Michel Coulon	3 December 1995 (aged 23)	5	0	(Vanuatu Football Federation) Tafea
20	DF	Jonathan Spokeyjack	13 November 1998 (aged 20)	2	0	(Vanuatu Football Federation) Ifira Black Bird
21	GK	Dick Taiwia	28 December 1997 (aged 21)	4	0	(Vanuatu Football Federation) Ifira Black Bird
22	GK	James Chilia	23 March 2001 (aged 18)	0	0	(Vanuatu Football Federation) Tupuji Imere
23	DF	Waiwo Kalmet	26 April 1999 (aged 20)	0	0	(Vanuatu Football Federation) Tafea

== Group B ==
=== American Samoa ===
Head coach: Tunoa Lui

No.	Pos.	Player	Date of birth (age)	Caps	Goals	Club
1	GK	Nicky Salapu	13 September 1980 (aged 38)	17	0	(Football Federation American Samoa) PanSa East
2	MF	Takai Pouli	18 July 2000 (aged 18)	0	0	(Football Federation American Samoa) Vaiala Tongan
3	DF	Jaiyah Saelua	19 July 1988 (aged 30)	11	0	(Football Federation American Samoa) FC SKBC
4	DF	Ryan Samuelu	19 February 1991 (aged 28)	4	0	(Football Federation American Samoa) Pago Youth
5	DF	Ueli Tualaulelei	27 August 1999 (aged 19)	0	0	(Football Federation American Samoa) Pago Youth
6	MF	Kuresa Taga'i	4 August 2000 (aged 18)	0	0	(Football Federation American Samoa) Ilaoa and To'omata
7	MF	Austin Kaleopa	24 November 2001 (aged 17)	0	0	(Football Federation American Samoa) Utulei Youth
8	DF	Roy Ledoux	26 June 2000 (aged 19)	0	0	(Football Federation American Samoa) Pago Youth
9	DF	Walter Pati	31 March 2002 (aged 17)	0	0	(Football Federation American Samoa) Pago Youth
10	FW	MJ Faoa-Danielson	13 April 2000 (aged 19)	0	0	(Football Federation American Samoa) Vaiala Tongan
11	MF	Milo Tiatia	18 February 2002 (aged 17)	0	0	(Football Federation American Samoa) Royal Puma
12	MF	Mark Taga'i	28 March 2002 (aged 17)	0	0	(Football Federation American Samoa) Ilaoa and To'omata
13	DF	Matthew Taga'i	28 March 2002 (aged 17)	0	0	(Football Federation American Samoa) Ilaoa and To'omata
14	DF	Palauni Tapusoa	1 February 1994 (aged 25)	0	0	(Football Federation American Samoa) Pago Youth
15	MF	Chris Fa'amoana	2 August 2001 (aged 17)	0	0	(Football Federation American Samoa) Pago Youth
16	FW	Junior Teoni	6 February 2001 (aged 18)	0	0	(Football Federation American Samoa)
17	FW	King Moe	21 January 2002 (aged 17)	0	0	(Football Federation American Samoa)
18	MF	Puni Samuelu	16 August 1996 (aged 22)	0	0	(Football Federation American Samoa) Pago Youth
19	DF	Tuaki Latu	15 July 2000 (aged 18)	0	0	(Football Federation American Samoa) Vaiala Tongan
20	DF	Uasila'a Heleta	27 February 1987 (aged 32)	16	0	(Football Federation American Samoa) Lion Heart
23	GK	Hengihengi Ikuvalu	2 December 2002 (aged 16)	0	0	(Football Federation American Samoa) Pago Youth

=== Fiji ===
Head coach: (France) Christophe Gamel

No.	Pos.	Player	Date of birth (age)	Caps	Goals	Club
1	GK	Simione Tamanisau	5 June 1982 (aged 37)	37	0	(Fiji Football Association) Suva
3	DF	Kavaia Rawaqa	20 September 1990 (aged 28)	17	0	(Fiji Football Association) Lautoka
5	DF	Remueru Tekiate	7 August 1990 (aged 28)	22	0	(Fiji Football Association) Suva
6	MF	Zibraaz Sahib	9 September 1989 (aged 29)	11	0	(Fiji Football Association) Lautoka
7	DF	Dave Radrigai	15 March 1990 (aged 29)	20	2	(Fiji Football Association) Lautoka
8	MF	Setareki Hughes	8 June 1995 (aged 24)	17	0	(Fiji Football Association) Rewa
9	FW	Roy Krishna	30 August 1987 (aged 31)	36	23	(All India Football Federation) ATK
10	DF	Nicholas Prasad	7 December 1995 (aged 23)	4	0	(German Football Association) SpVgg Bayreuth
11	FW	Tito Vodowaqa	9 April 1999 (aged 20)	1	0	(Fiji Football Association) Nadi
12	MF	Kishan Sami	13 March 2000 (aged 19)	8	0	(Fiji Football Association) Ba
13	MF	Malakai Rakula	16 May 1992 (aged 27)	3	0	(Fiji Football Association) Ba
14	FW	Samuela Drudru	30 April 1989 (aged 30)	9	2	(Fiji Football Association) Lautoka
15	DF	Ame Votoniu	12 August 1985 (aged 33)	11	1	(Fiji Football Association) Nadi
16	MF	Isikeli Ratucava	6 November 1998 (aged 20)	0	0	(Fiji Football Association) Nasinu
17	MF	Patrick Joseph	3 May 1998 (aged 21)	2	0	(Fiji Football Association) Nadi
18	DF	Laisenia Raura (Captain)	14 October 1990 (aged 28)	19	0	(Fiji Football Association) Suva
19	MF	Peni Tuigulagula	8 March 1999 (aged 20)	2	0	(Fiji Football Association) Nadi
20	DF	Savenaca Baledrokadroka	20 May 1999 (aged 20)	2	0	(Fiji Football Association) Nasinu
21	MF	Christopher Wasasala	31 December 1994 (aged 24)	15	5	(Fiji Football Association) Suva
22	GK	Beniamino Mateinaqara	19 August 1987 (aged 31)	19	0	(Fiji Football Association) Lautoka
23	FW	Rusiate Matarerega	17 January 1993 (aged 26)	14	3	(Fiji Football Association) Nadi

=== New Caledonia ===
Head coach: Thierry Sardo

No.	Pos.	Player	Date of birth (age)	Caps	Goals	Club
1	GK	Rocky Nyikeine	26 May 1992 (aged 27)	18	0	(New Caledonian Football Federation) Hienghène Sport
2	DF	Jorys Mène	2 January 1995 (aged 24)	2	0	(French Football Federation) Ailly s/Somme Samara
3	DF	Joseph Tchako	30 March 1993 (aged 26)	9	0	(New Caledonian Football Federation) Mont-Dore
4	DF	Louis Ukajo	3 February 1989 (aged 30)	0	0	(French Football Federation) Stade Poitevin
5	DF	Mickaël Tiaou	3 April 1992 (aged 27)	2	0	(New Caledonian Football Federation) Magenta
6	MF	Cédric Sansot	13 April 1989 (aged 30)	15	0	(New Caledonian Football Federation) Hienghène Sport
7	MF	Joël Wakanumuné	30 September 1986 (aged 32)	34	1	(New Caledonian Football Federation) Tiga Sport
8	MF	Richard Sele	31 August 1989 (aged 29)	9	2	(New Caledonian Football Federation) Magenta
9	FW	Jean-Philippe Saïko	29 August 1990 (aged 28)	4	2	(New Caledonian Football Federation) Magenta
10	FW	César Zeoula	29 August 1989 (aged 29)	31	9	(French Football Federation) Schiltigheim
11	FW	Bertrand Kaï	6 June 1983 (aged 36)	38	21	(New Caledonian Football Federation) Hienghène Sport
12	MF	Jekob Jeno	22 June 2000 (aged 19)	0	0	(French Football Federation) Amiens
13	DF	Jacques Wamytan	9 December 1988 (aged 30)	5	0	(Tahitian Football Federation) Central Sport
14	MF	Didier Simane	3 August 1996 (aged 22)	2	0	(New Caledonian Football Federation) Magenta
15	MF	Cédric Decoire	15 May 1994 (aged 25)	4	0	(New Caledonian Football Federation) Mont-Dore
16	GK	Mickaël Ulile	16 July 1997 (aged 21)	8	0	(French Football Federation) Abbeville
17	DF	Jean-Christ Wajoka	6 September 1992 (aged 26)	4	0	(New Caledonian Football Federation) Magenta
18	DF	Emile Béaruné	7 February 1990 (aged 29)	36	0	(New Caledonian Football Federation) Hienghène Sport
19	FW	Nathanaël Hmaen	4 August 1993 (aged 25)	5	0	(New Caledonian Football Federation) Magenta
20	GK	Jean-Gilles Hnamuko	2 March 1996 (aged 23)	0	0	(Luxembourg Football Federation) Swift Hesperange
21	DF	Willy Wahéo	14 August 1991 (aged 27)	3	0	(New Caledonian Football Federation) Ne Drehu
22	FW	Stéphane Tein-Padom	8 June 1994 (aged 25)	0	0	(French Football Federation) Châtellerault
23	MF	Geordy Gony	15 May 1994 (aged 25)	6	1	(New Caledonian Football Federation) Hienghène Sport

=== Solomon Islands ===
Head coach: (Netherlands) Wim Rijsbergen

The final squad was announced on 27 June 2019.

No.	Pos.	Player	Date of birth (age)	Caps	Goals	Club
1	GK	Philip Mango	28 August 1995 (aged 23)	19	0	(Solomon Islands Football Federation) Solomon Warriors
2	DF	Hadisi Aengari	23 October 1988 (aged 30)	37	0	(Solomon Islands Football Federation) Solomon Warriors
3	DF	Allen Peter	15 September 1995 (aged 23)	6	0	(Solomon Islands Football Federation) Kossa
4	DF	Boni Pride	10 September 1995 (aged 23)	8	0	(Solomon Islands Football Federation) Henderson Eels
5	DF	Michael Boso	3 September 1991 (aged 27)	10	0	(Fiji Football Association) Suva
6	DF	Andrew Rarangia	1 June 1994 (aged 25)	1	0	(Solomon Islands Football Federation) Henderson Eels
7	MF	Atkin Kaua	4 April 1996 (aged 23)	18	3	(Solomon Islands Football Federation) Solomon Warriors
8	MF	Patrick Taroga	25 May 2000 (aged 19)	0	0	(Solomon Islands Football Federation) Marist
9	FW	Benjamin Totori (Captain)	20 February 1986 (aged 33)	50	24	(Fiji Football Association) Lautoka
10	MF	Jerry Donga	31 January 1991 (aged 28)	22	3	(Solomon Islands Football Federation) Solomon Warriors
11	MF	Gagame Feni	21 August 1992 (aged 26)	20	4	(Fiji Football Association) Suva
12	GK	Timothy Maerasia	19 June 1995 (aged 24)	0	0	(Solomon Islands Football Federation) Solomon Warriors
13	DF	John Aeta	2 September 2000 (aged 18)	1	0	(Solomon Islands Football Federation) Marist
14	MF	Joses Nawo	3 May 1988 (aged 31)	30	6	(Solomon Islands Football Federation) Henderson Eels
15	MF	Alwin Hou	18 September 1996 (aged 22)	2	1	(Solomon Islands Football Federation) Solomon Warriors
16	DF	Emmanuel Poila	16 July 1990 (aged 28)	20	1	(Solomon Islands Football Federation) Solomon Warriors
17	MF	Dennis Ifunaoa	18 September 1991 (aged 27)	4	1	(Fiji Football Association) Labasa
18	FW	Raynick Laeta	16 November 1999 (aged 19)	0	0	(Solomon Islands Football Federation) Henderson Eels
19	FW	Andrew Abba	25 November 1989 (aged 29)	2	1	(New Zealand Football) Waitakere United
20	MF	Tutizama Tanito	27 November 1993 (aged 25)	12	2	(Papua New Guinea Football Association) Hekari United
21	GK	Desmond Tutu	29 September 1997 (aged 21)	5	0	(Solomon Islands Football Federation) Henderson Eels
22	MF	Micah Lea'alafa	1 June 1991 (aged 28)	15	6	(New Zealand Football) Auckland City
23	FW	Raphael Le'ai	9 September 2003 (aged 15)	0	0	(New Zealand Football) Wellington Phoenix Youth

=== Tahiti ===
Head coach: Samuel Garcia

No.	Pos.	Player	Date of birth (age)	Caps	Goals	Club
1	GK	Teave Teamotuaitau	17 April 1992 (aged 27)	2	0	(Tahitian Football Federation) Vénus
2	DF	Farearii Tuteina	12 May 1998 (aged 21)	1	0	(Tahitian Football Federation) Tefana
3	MF	Kevin Barbe	2 September 1997 (aged 21)	2	0	(Tahitian Football Federation) Vénus
4	DF	Jean-Claude Paraue	24 May 1989 (aged 30)	2	0	(Tahitian Football Federation) Tefana
5	MF	Nick Tauotaha	30 April 1993 (aged 26)	0	0	(Tahitian Football Federation) Tiare
6	DF	Tefai Faehau	26 February 1988 (aged 31)	2	0	(Tahitian Football Federation) Vénus
7	DF	Marama Amau	13 January 1991 (aged 28)	6	0	(Tahitian Football Federation) Vénus
8	MF	Rooarii Roo	11 December 1989 (aged 29)	3	0	(Tahitian Football Federation) Manu-Ura
9	FW	François Mu	11 August 1995 (aged 23)	1	0	(Tahitian Football Federation) Manu-Ura
10	FW	Teaonui Tehau	1 September 1992 (aged 26)	26	16	(Tahitian Football Federation) Dragon
12	MF	Mauarii Tehina	16 October 1993 (aged 25)	5	0	(Tahitian Football Federation) Vénus
13	MF	Stanley Atani	27 January 1990 (aged 29)	19	5	(Tahitian Football Federation) Vénus
14	MF	Tamatoa Tetauira	17 April 1996 (aged 23)	6	0	(Tahitian Football Federation) Dragon
15	DF	Matatia Paama	3 October 1992 (aged 26)	6	0	(Tahitian Football Federation) Central Sport
16	GK	Benjamin Tardivel	3 December 1987 (aged 31)	0	0	(Tahitian Football Federation) Dragon
18	MF	Tevairoa Tehuritaua	15 October 1994 (aged 24)	5	4	(Tahitian Football Federation) Tiare
19	DF	Tuteramana Teihotua	24 October 1995 (aged 23)	1	0	(Tahitian Football Federation) Tiare Hinano
20	DF	Rico Haring	7 July 1997 (aged 22)	2	0	(Tahitian Football Federation) Tiare
21	FW	Louis Gitton	2 April 2002 (aged 17)	0	0	(Tahitian Football Federation) Vénus
22	MF	Kitin Maro	1 May 1999 (aged 20)	0	0	(Tahitian Football Federation) Vénus

=== Tuvalu ===
Head coach: Mati Fusi

No.	Pos.	Player	Date of birth (age)	Caps	Goals	Club
1	GK	Katepu Iosua	11 May 1988 (aged 31)	8	0	(Tuvalu Islands Football Association) Tofaga
2	MF	Paulo Lotonu	20 March 1996 (aged 23)	5	1	(Tuvalu Islands Football Association) Nauti
3	DF	Sakaio Faimalaga	14 August 1997 (aged 21)	0	0	(Tuvalu Islands Football Association) Tofaga
4	DF	Meauke Tuilagi	5 September 1997 (aged 21)	4	0	(Tuvalu Islands Football Association) Niutao
5	DF	Kalamelu Seloto	24 February 1992 (aged 27)	4	0	(Tuvalu Islands Football Association) Nauti
6	MF	Tinoga Temate	18 May 1995 (aged 24)	0	0	(Tuvalu Islands Football Association) Tamanuku
7	MF	Taufaiva Ionatana	5 February 1993 (aged 26)	5	1	(Tuvalu Islands Football Association) Nauti
8	FW	Sosene Vailine	7 March 1993 (aged 26)	3	0	(Tuvalu Islands Football Association) Nauti
9	MF	Nelesone Musika	7 May 1997 (aged 22)	0	0	(New Zealand Football) Levin AFC
10	MF	Afelee Valoa	5 July 1990 (aged 29)	5	0	(Tuvalu Islands Football Association) Nauti
11	FW	Alopua Petoa	24 January 1990 (aged 29)	10	8	(Tuvalu Islands Football Association) Ha'apai United
12	DF	Paolo Taitai	2 September 1996 (aged 22)	5	0	(Tuvalu Islands Football Association) Tamanuku
13	DF	Nokisi Kaitu	2 May 2000 (aged 19)	0	0	(New Zealand Football) Te Atatu
14	DF	Sepetaio Nokisi	11 September 1993 (aged 25)	0	0	(New Zealand Football) Te Atatu
15	DF	Sueni Founuku	15 June 1994 (aged 25)	1	0	(Tuvalu Islands Football Association) Tofaga
16	DF	Maalosi Alefaio	19 January 1993 (aged 26)	0	0	(New Zealand Football) Te Atatu
17	DF	Silimai Siaosi	14 October 1994 (aged 24)	2	0	(Tuvalu Islands Football Association) Manu Laeva
18	MF	Nika Tima	7 September 1997 (aged 21)	0	0	(Tuvalu Islands Football Association)
19	DF	Waintau Taaroa	12 October 1993 (aged 25)	0	0	(Tuvalu Islands Football Association) Lakena United
20	FW	Afelau Kalena	23 October 1991 (aged 27)	0	0	(Tuvalu Islands Football Association) Ha'apai United
21	FW	Hosea Sente	2 April 2000 (aged 19)	0	0	(Tuvalu Islands Football Association) Nauti
22	MF	Fata Filemoni	2 July 1995 (aged 24)	0	0	(Tuvalu Islands Football Association) Tofaga
23	GK	Teoliga Fakailoga	12 September 1997 (aged 21)	1	0	(Tuvalu Islands Football Association) Nauti
