= Football at the 2019 Pacific Games =

- Venue: Various
- Location: Apia, Samoa
- Dates: 8–20 July 2019

Football at the 2019 Pacific Games was held on 8–20 July in Apia in Samoa.

In the men's football tournament, the gold medal was won by New Zealand's under-23 team.

The women's tournament was won by Papua New Guinea, the country's fifth successive gold medal in women's football – Papua New Guinea have won every edition of the event since it began at the Pacific Games in 2003. The silver medal was the first ever honour for the Samoa women's national football team.

== Medal summary ==
=== Medal table ===
* Host nation (Samoa)

Rank	Nation	Gold	Silver	Bronze	Total
1	New Zealand	1	0	0	1
1	Papua New Guinea	1	0	0	1
3	New Caledonia	0	1	0	1
3	Samoa*	0	1	0	1
5	Fiji	0	0	2	2
Totals (5 entries)		2	2	2	6

=== Results ===
Event	Gold	Silver	Bronze
Men	New Zealand; Cameron Brown; Jordan Spain; Sean Liddicoat; Robert Tipelu; Billy Jones; Dane Schnell; Ollie Whyte; Lachie McIsaac; Logan Rogerson; Seth Clark; Jake Porter; Conor Tracey; Jackson Brady; Jorge Akers; Ihaia Delaney; Stafford Dowling; Sean Cooper; Dylan de Jong; Byron Heath; Ellis Hare-Reid	New Caledonia; Rocky Nyikeine; Jorys Mène; Joseph Tchako; Louis Ukajo; Mickaël Tiaou; Cédric Sansot; Joël Wakanumuné; Richard Sele; Jean-Philippe Saïko; César Zeoula; Bertrand Kaï; Jekob Jeno; Jacques Wamytan; Didier Simane; Cédric Decoire; Mickaël Ulile; Jean-Christ Wajoka; Emile Béaruné; Nathanaël Hmaen; Jean-Gilles Hnamuko; Willy Wahéo; Stéphane Tein-Padom; Geordy Gony	Fiji; Simione Tamanisau; Kavaia Rawaqa; Remueru Tekiate; Zibraaz Sahib; Dave Radrigai; Setareki Hughes; Roy Krishna; Nicholas Prasad; Tito Vodowaqa; Kishan Sami; Malakai Rakula; Samuela Drudru; Ame Votoniu; Isikeli Ratucava; Patrick Joseph; Laisenia Raura; Peni Tuigulagula; Savenaca Baledrokadroka; Christopher Wasasala; Beniamino Mateinaqara; Rusiate Matarerega
Women	Papua New Guinea; Fidelma Watpore; Betty Sam; Faith Kasiray; Dorcas Sesevo; Lucy Maino; Joelyne Aimi; Michaella Kurabi; Georgina Bakani; Asaiso Gossie; Margret Joseph; Sandra Birum; Rayleen Bauelua; Yvonne Gabong; Serah Tamgol; Deslyn Siniu; Marie Kaipu; Ramona Padio; Lydia Kose; Shalom Waida; Meagen Gunemba; Selina Unamba; Gloria Laeli; Gloria Balamus	Samoa; Epi Tafili; Alisa Tuatagaloa; Taylor Faleafa; Patricia Aoelua; Jecky Toma; Tiare Tuimavave; Maddy Ah Ki; Moreva Mauma; Ronisa Lipi; Rivalina Fuimaono; Hana Malo Vaga; Sina Sataraka; Hazel Peleti; Renee Atonio; Suitupe Tafafa; Torijan Lyne-Lewis; Mariah Bullock; Lianna Soifua; Matalena Daniells; Melesete Aia; Caitlin Pritchard; Vineta Faleaana; Semeatu Lemana; Talaesea Mulitalo Fogapapa	Fiji; Anaseini Maucuna; Annette Nainima; Ledua Senisea; Naomi Waqanidrola; Joyce Naceva; Cema Nasau; Koleta Likuculacula; Aliza Hussein; Asilika Gasau; Luisa Tamanitoakula; Jotivini Tabua; Adi Bakaniceva; Veniana Ranadi; Unaisi Tuberi; Sekola Waqanidrola; Sofi Diyalowai; Viniana Riwai; Silina Qarawaqa; Timaima Vuniyayawa; Maca Ralagi; Lora Bukalidi; Viniana Buke; Maria Parr

== See also ==
- Football at the Pacific Games
