= New Caledonia at the 2015 Pacific Games =

- The two co-official flags of New Caledonia
- IOC code: NCL

4 July 2019 – 18 July 2019
- Competitors: 354 in 22 sports
- Medals Ranked 2nd: Gold 60 Silver 50 Bronze 56 Total 166

Pacific Games appearances
- 1963; 1966; 1969; 1971; 1975; 1979; 1983; 1987; 1991; 1995; 1999; 2003; 2007; 2011; 2015; 2019; 2023

New Caledonia competed at the 2015 Pacific Games in Port Moresby, Papua New Guinea from 4 to 18 July 2015. New Caledonia listed 354 competitors as of 4 July 2015. Four competitors were qualified in two sports. (Note: Solenne Kerleguer and Mathieu Szalamacha qualified in athletics and triathlon. Charlotte Robin qualified in swimming and triathlon, and Thomas Roubio qualified in athletic and taekwando.)

== Athletics ==
=== Parasport ===
Men

- Avelino Monteiro

== Basketball ==
Women

- Dominique Armand
- Awéko Passa
- Adeline Souque
- Marie-Hélène Trocas
- Maryko Durand
- Myriam Fenuafanote
- Roselyne Forest
- Samantha Honda
- Yolène Koteureu
- Alissone Laukau
- Diana Moutry
- Lingdsey Niuaiti Épouse Tetuanui

Men

- Beniela Adjouhgniope
- Emmanuel Soeria-Ouamba
- Jean-Jacques Taufana
- Rodrigue Tetainanuarii
- Cédric Tetuanui
- Joan Delaunay-Belleville
- Ruben Ha-Ho
- Sébastien Hnawia
- Yann Mathelon
- Karyl Paillandi
- Landry Peu
- Stéphane Saminadin
- Steeven Sillant

== Beach volleyball ==
Women

- Moone Armonie Kohnu
- Aurelie Konhu

Men

- Benjamin Hweillia
- Jonathan Taoupoulou

== Bodybuilding ==
New Caledonia qualified 5 athletes in bodybuilding:

Women

- Virginie Foucault

Men

- Guillaume Bruneau
- Nelson Sanmarso
- Matthieu Soerjana
- Yvan Thales

== Cricket ==
New Caledonia qualified men's and women's teams in cricket (30 players):

Women

Women's tournament.

- Rosina Angexetine
- Louise Jeka
- Emmanuel Katrawi
- Sonia Kaudre
- Elise Kecine
- Andrea Kilama
- Madanie Kowi
- Emma Malla
- Appolonie Mazeno
- Rowena Philippon
- Jeannette Qaeze
- Rose Siwa
- Louise Wahmowe
- Louise Wawine
- Jessica Wenevine

Men

Men's tournament.

- Nicholls Adjouhgniope
- Kalepo Folituu
- Constant Haeweng
- Jean-Yves Hmae
- Ipahnue Kecine
- Johnatan Lapacas
- David Magulu
- Nicolas Magulu
- Atea Nea
- Joseph Nigote
- Laurent Onocia
- Noel Sinyeue
- Charles Siwene
- Steeve Tchidopoane
- Jonas Waneux

== Football ==
New Caledonia qualified men's and women's teams in football (46 athletes):

Women

– Women's tournament.

- Josiane Ayawa
- Kim Maguire
- Chrystelle Nigote
- Lyndsay Nyipie
- Julia Paul
- Honorine Pouidja
- Myranda Rabah
- Jessica Ries
- Noé Valefakaaga
- Hélène Waengene
- Christelle Wahnawe
- Bernadette Euribeari
- Marie- Déborah Wanakaija
- Joyce Waunie
- Céline Xolawawa
- Karine Xozame
- Sidney Gatha
- Isabelle Hace
- Marielle Haocas
- Louise Humuni
- Glenda Jaine
- Brenda Kenon
- Aurélie Lalie

Men

– Men's tournament.

Head coach: (France) Thierry Sardo

No.	Pos.	Player	Date of birth (age)	Caps	Goals	Club
1	GK	Thomas Schmidt	June 4, 1996 (age 29)	1	0	(New Caledonian Football Federation) AS Mont-Dore
16	GK	Jimmy Wahnapo	May 28, 1996 (age 29)	0	0	(New Caledonian Football Federation) AS Wetr
21	GK	Jacques Nykeine		0	0	(New Caledonian Football Federation) Tiga Sports
2	DF	Jorys Mène	2 January 1995 (age 30)	0	0	(French Football Federation) US Tourcoing FC
3	DF	Aquilas Wahnapo	25 April 1993 (age 32)	0	0	(French Football Federation) Sud Nivernais Imphy Decize
4	DF	Jean Brice Wadriako	15 January 1993 (age 32)	1	0	(New Caledonian Football Federation) A.S. Magenta
5	DF	Jean Luc Decoire	16 April 1996 (age 29)	1	0	(New Caledonian Football Federation) AS Mont-Dore
13	DF	Joseph Tchako	30 March 1993 (age 32)	0	0	(New Caledonian Football Federation) AS Mont-Dore
18	DF	Pierre Kauma		1	0	(New Caledonian Football Federation) A.S. Lössi
22	DF	Théo Jalabert	22 December 1996 (age 28)	0	0	(New Caledonian Football Federation) AS Mont-Dore
6	MF	David Bearune		0	0	(New Caledonian Football Federation) Gaïtcha FCN
10	MF	Cedric Decoire	15 May 1994 (age 31)	0	0	(French Football Federation) OFC Charleville
12	MF	Yorick Hnautra		0	0	(New Caledonian Football Federation) A.S. Lössi
14	MF	Nathaniel Hmaen		1	0	(New Caledonian Football Federation) Tiga Sport
15	MF	Joseph Athale		1	0	(New Caledonian Football Federation) AS Wetr
17	MF	Ben Malakai	8 November 1995 (age 30)	0	0	(New Caledonian Football Federation) AS Mont-Dore
19	MF	Michael Partodikromo	2 February 1996 (age 29)	0	0	(New Zealand Football) Team Wellington
20	MF	Johan Idrele		1	0	(New Caledonian Football Federation) AS Wetr
23	MF	Vince Poithily		1	0	(New Caledonian Football Federation) Belep Mont-Dore
7	FW	Leon Wahnawe		0	0	(New Caledonian Football Federation) Tiga Sport
8	FW	Shaffy Mandaoue		0	0	(New Caledonian Football Federation) A.S. Lössi
9	FW	Jim Ouka	June 25, 1996 (age 29)	0	0	(New Caledonian Football Federation) Gaïtcha FCN
11	FW	Raphael Oiremon	May 22, 1995 (age 30)	1	0	(New Caledonian Football Federation) AS Mont-Dore

== Powerlifting ==
- Maxime Glandais
- Philippe La
- Florent Poulet
- Frédérick Warsidi

== Rugby sevens ==
Women

4th – Women's tournament

- Shirley Benemie
- Djesy Gaia
- Lydie Wamejo
- Manon Boudet
- Theresa Boulouguen
- Louise Waiane
- Vanessa Beaudouin
- Claire Hillaireau
- Yolaine Yengo
- Marie Hélène Wahnawe
- Anne-Marie Waitreu
- Marie Aymeric

== Shooting ==
New Caledonia qualified seven athletes in shooting:

Women

- Marion Roumagne

Men

- Christian Jahja
- Walter Le Pironnec
- Warenn Le Pironnec
- Kévin Lepigeon
- Johan Perchard – 25 m pistol mixed.
- Philippe Simoni

== Swimming ==
New Caledonia qualified 20 athletes in swimming:

Women

- Suzanne Afchain
- Lucie Auberger
- Leilani Flament
- Lara Grangeon
- Armelle Hidrio
- Ylenka Maurin
- Lea Ricarrere
- Charlotte Robin
- Emma Terebo
- Adeline Williams

Men

- Kevin Calmettes
- Jeremie Dufourmantelle
- Julien-Pierre Goyetche
- Florent Janin
- Emmanuel Limozin
- Thibaut Mary
- Thomas Oswald
- Lou Pujol
- Hugo Ricarrere
- Hugo Tormento

== Table tennis ==
Women

- Ornella Bouteille
- Fabianna Faehau
- Cathy Gauthier

== Weightlifting ==
Women

- Julietta Mafutuna

Men

- Igor Lagikula
- Petelo Lagikula
