= Ame Votoniu =

Fijian footballer

Personal information
- Full name: Ame Votoniu
- Date of birth: 12 August 1985 (age 41)
- Place of birth: Fiji
- Position: Defender

Team information
- Current team: Nadi

Senior career*
Years	Team	Apps	(Gls)
–2012	Tavua		
2012–	Nadi		

International career^{‡}
2017–	Fiji	15	(1)
Medal record
Men's football
Representing Fiji
Pacific Games
Bronze medal – third place	2019 Samoa
Pacific Mini Games
Silver medal – second place	2017 Vanuatu
- * Club domestic league appearances and goals ‡ National team caps and goals as of 20 July 2019

Ame Votoniu (born 12 August 1985) is a Fijian footballer who plays as a defender or midfielder for Fijian club Nadi and the Fiji national team.

== Club career ==
Votoniu started his career with Tavua. In 2012 he moved to Nadi.

== National team ==
In 2017 Votoniu was called up by coach Christophe Gamel for the Fiji national football team. He made his debut on November 19, 2017, in a 2–0 loss against Estonia. He came into the field replacing Narendra Rao in the 67th minute of play.

=== International goals ===
Scores and results list Fiji's goal tally first.

No	Date	Venue	Opponent	Score	Result	Competition
1.	22 March 2018	Rizal Memorial Stadium, Manila, Philippines	Philippines	1–3	2–3	Friendly

== Honours ==
Fiji

- Pacific Games: Bronze Medalist, 2019
- Pacific Mini Games: Silver Medalist, 2017
