= Laisenia Raura =

Fijian footballer

Personal information
- Full name: Laisenia Naioko Raura
- Date of birth: 14 October 1990 (age 36)
- Place of birth: Fiji
- Positions: Defender; midfielder

Team information
- Current team: Suva F.C.
- Number: 18

Youth career
- Ba

Senior career*
Years	Team	Apps	(Gls)
2009–2018	Ba		
2018–	Suva F.C.		

International career^{‡}
2012	Fiji U-23	5	(0)
2015–	Fiji	22	(0)
Medal record
Men's football
Representing Fiji
Pacific Games
Bronze medal – third place	2019 Samoa
Pacific Mini Games
Silver medal – second place	2017 Vanuatu
- * Club domestic league appearances and goals as of 15 December 2017 ‡ National team caps and goals as of 31 July 2019

Laisenia Raura, sometimes called Laisenia Naioko (born 14 October 1990), is a Fijian footballer who plays as a midfielder for Suva in the Fiji National Football League.

== Club career ==
Raura began his football career with Ba F.C. in 2009. In 2018 he moved to Suva F.C. In 2020 he switched back to Ba.

== International career ==
Raura made his debut for the Fiji national football team on 10 November 2015 in a 2–1 loss against Vanuatu. In 2016 he was a member of the Fijian squad for the 2016 OFC Nations Cup.

In March 2019 he was suspended after being red-carded in a match against New Caledonia, and so missed Fiji's friendly match against the Mauritius national football team.

== Honours ==
Fiji

- Pacific Games: Bronze Medalist, 2019
- Pacific Mini Games: Silver Medalist, 2017
