= Isikeli Ratucava =

Fijian footballer

Personal information
- Full name: Isikeli Ratucava
- Date of birth: 6 November 1998 (age 27)
- Place of birth: Nakobo, Cakaudrove Province, Fiji
- Positions: Defender; midfielder

Team information
- Current team: Nasinu

Youth career
- –2016: Suva

Senior career*
Years	Team	Apps	(Gls)
2016–2017	Suva		
2017	Rakiraki		
2018	Lami		
2018-	Nasinu		

International career
2019	Fiji U23	0	(0)
2019–	Fiji	3	(0)
Medal record
Men's football
Representing Fiji
Pacific Games
Bronze medal – third place	2019 Samoa
- * Club domestic league appearances and goals

Isikeli Ratucava (born 6 November 1998) is a Fijian footballer who plays as a left back for Fijian club Nasinu and the Fiji national team.

== Club career ==
Ratucava came through the youth ranks of Suva. In 2016 he made his debut for the first team in a game against Labasa at Subrail Park. However after his debut, he didn't manage to get into the starting eleven for Suva. After stints with second division clubs Lami and Rakiraki he signed in October 2018 for Fiji Premier League side Nasinu.

== National team ==
In 2019 Ratucava was called up by coach Christophe Gamel for the Fiji national football team. He made his debut on June 7, 2019, in a 1–1 draw against Tahiti. He came in for Kavaia Rawaqa in the 46th minute of play. After his debut Ratucava was included in Gamel's squad for the 2019 Pacific Games were Ratucava and his team mates managed to win a bronze medal.

== Honours ==
Fiji

- Pacific Games: Bronze Medalist, 2019
