= Patrick Joseph (footballer) =

Fijian footballer (born 1998)

Personal information
- Full name: Patrick Neel Joseph
- Date of birth: 3 May 1998 (age 28)
- Place of birth: Nadi, Fiji
- Position: Midfielder

Team information
- Current team: Nadi
- Number: 17

Youth career
- –2016: Nadi

Senior career*
Years	Team	Apps	(Gls)
2016–	Nadi		

International career
2015	Fiji U17	5	(0)
2016	Fiji U20	0	(0)
2019	Fiji U23	4	(3)
2019–	Fiji	10	(1)
Medal record
Men's football
Representing Fiji
Pacific Games
Bronze medal – third place	2019 Samoa
Bronze medal – third place	2023 Solomon Islands
MSG Prime Minister's Cup
Third place	2022 Vanuatu
- * Club domestic league appearances and goals

Patrick Joseph (born 3 May 1998) is a Fijian footballer who plays as a midfielder for Fijian club Nadi and the Fiji national team.

== Club career ==
Joseph came through the youth ranks of Nadi. In 2016 he made his debut for the first team. The first tournament that Joseph participated in was the Vodafone Fiji Fact in May 2017. In 2019 Joseph won his first prize for Nadi by winning the Fiji FACT in 2019. Joseph was named as Most Valuable Player of the tournament.

== National team ==
In 2019 Joseph was called up by coach Christophe Gamel for the Fiji national football team. He made his debut on March 18, 2019, in a 3–0 win against New Caledonia. He came in for Dave Radrigai in the 69th minute of play. After his debut Joseph was included in Gamel's squad for the 2019 Pacific Games were Joseph and his teammates managed to win a bronze medal. Joseph scored his first goal for the national team at the Pacific Games in a 4–4 draw against the Solomon Islands

== Honours ==
Fiji

- Pacific Games: Bronze Medalist, 2019, 2023
- MSG Prime Minister's Cup: 3rd place, 2022
