= Ryan Naresh =

Fijian footballer

Personal information
- Date of birth: 12 May 2007 (age 19)
- Place of birth: Fiji
- Positions: Defender; midfielder

Team information
- Current team: Ba
- Number: 18

Youth career
- Ba

Senior career*
Years	Team	Apps	(Gls)
2024–2026	Ba	23	(2)
2026	Bula	4	(0)
2026–	Ba	3	(0)
Medal record
Men's football
Representing Fiji
MSG Prime Minister's Cup
Winner	2026 Fiji
- * Club domestic league appearances and goals as of 29 May 2026 ‡ National team caps and goals as of 29 May 2026

Ryan Naresh (born 12 May 2007) is a Fijian professional footballer who plays as a defender or midfielder for OFC Professional League club Ba FA.

== Early and personal life ==
Naresh was educated at FSC Primary School in Ba Province. His brother Rahul is also a footballer, and his father Rinal is a former footballer.

== Club career ==
Naresh began his career at Ba FA in the Fiji Premier League, playing 23 matches and scoring 2 goals over 2 years, including a goal against Lautoka in 2024, coming off the bench to score in a 3–1 win.

Naresh signed for newly created Bula FC for the inaugural season of the OFC Professional League.

== International career ==
Naresh earned his maiden call-up for the Fiji senior side in May 2026, with Stéphane Auvray, also the coach of Bula, naming him in a 21-man squad for friendlies against Vanuatu.

== Honours ==
Fiji

- MSG Prime Minister's Cup : 2026
