= Benjamin Tardivel =

Tahitian footballer (born 1987)

Personal information
- Date of birth: 3 December 1987 (age 38)
- Place of birth: Tahiti
- Height: 1.96 m (6 ft 5 in)
- Position: Goalkeeper

Team information
- Current team: A.S. Dragon

Senior career*
Years	Team	Apps	(Gls)
2017–	A.S. Dragon		

International career^{‡}
2019–	Tahiti	1	(0)
- * Club domestic league appearances and goals ‡ National team caps and goals as of 10 July 2019

Benjamin Tardivel (born 3 December 1987) is a Tahitian international footballer who plays as a goalkeeper for Tahitian club A.S. Dragon. He made his debut for Tahiti at the 2019 Pacific Games, replacing Teave Teamotuaitau at halftime of a 7–0 victory against Tuvalu. Tardivel had previously been called up for two friendlies against New Caledonia in 2018, but did not appear in either match.

Tardivel was in the A.S. Dragon squad that took part in the 2018 OFC Champions League. He started against Lössi in the first group stage match for Dragon.
