= Setareki Hughes =

Fijian footballer

Personal information
- Full name: Setareki Waganitoga Hughes
- Date of birth: 8 June 1995 (age 31)
- Place of birth: Bua, Fiji
- Height: 1.71 m (5 ft 7 in)
- Position: Attacking midfielder

Team information
- Current team: Rewa
- Number: 8

Youth career
- Rewa

Senior career*
Years	Team	Apps	(Gls)
2012–2015	Rewa		
2015–2018	Suva		
2018–2025	Rewa		
2026–	Bula FC	0	(0)

International career^{‡}
2011	Fiji U-17	4	(0)
2013–2015	Fiji U-20	8	(0)
2016	Fiji U-23	3	(0)
2016–	Fiji	54	(3)
- Fiji Futsal
Medal record
Men's football
Representing Fiji
OFC U-20 Championship
Winner	2014 Fiji
Runner-up	2013 Fiji
Pacific Games
Bronze medal – third place	2019 Samoa
Bronze medal – third place	2023 Solomon Islands
Pacific Mini Games
Silver medal – second place	2017 Vanuatu
MSG Prime Minister's Cup
Runner-up	2024 Solomon Islands
Third place	2022 Vanuatu
- * Club domestic league appearances and goals as of 8 February 2018 ‡ National team caps and goals as of 7 September 2025

Setareki Waganitoga Hughes (born 8 June 1995) is a Fijian footballer who plays as a midfielder for Bula FC in the OFC Professional League.

== International career ==
Hughes was selected for the Fiji national under-20 team to compete at the 2015 FIFA U-20 World Cup in May 2015. he played in all three of Fiji's group matches against Germany, Honduras and Uzbekistan.

On 28 May 2016, he made his senior debut for the national team at the 2016 OFC Nations Cup in their 3–1 loss against New Zealand.

He was then also selected as part of the Fiji under-23 team for the 2016 Summer Olympics.

In 2019, he was selected for the 2019 Pacific Games. Fiji won a bronze medal.

=== International goals ===
Scores and results list Fiji's goal tally first.

No.	Date	Venue	Opponent	Score	Result	Competition
1.	10 July 2019	National Soccer Stadium, Apia, Samoa	American Samoa	1–0	9–0	2019 Pacific Games
2.	19 June 2024	HFC Bank Stadium, Suva, Fiji	Samoa	1–0	9–1	2024 OFC Nations Cup
3.	19 June 2024	HFC Bank Stadium, Suva, Fiji	Samoa	5–1	9–1	2024 OFC Nations Cup

== Honours ==
=== Player ===
Fiji

- Pacific Games: Bronze Medalist, 2019, 2023
- Pacific Mini Games: Silver Medalist, 2017
- MSG Prime Minister's Cup: Runner-up, 2024; 3rd place, 2022

Fiji U20

- OFC U-20 Championship: 2014; Runner-up, 2013

=== Individual ===
- 2016 Fiji Footballer of the Year

== Private life ==
Setareki's brother, Bruce Hughes is also a footballer who plays for Suva as well as Fiji U-20.
