= Kolu Kepo =

Papua New Guinean footballer

Personal information
- Full name: Kolu Kepo
- Date of birth: 15 July 1993 (age 33)
- Place of birth: Papua New Guinea
- Position: Forward

Team information
- Current team: Kalo

Senior career*
Years	Team	Apps	(Gls)
- Kalo

International career^{‡}
2016–	Papua New Guinea	6	(4)
Medal record
Men's football
Representing Papua New Guinea
MSG Prime Minister's Cup
Winner	2022 Vanuatu
Winner	2024 Solomon Islands
- * Club domestic league appearances and goals ‡ National team caps and goals as of 20 July 2019

Kolu Kepo (born July 15, 1993) is a footballer from Papua New Guinea. He plays for Kalo F.C. and the Papua New Guinea national football team.

== Hekari Central Cup ==
Even though he was disconsolate over losing the 2016 Hekari Central Cup final to Papaka, Kepo lifted the 2017 Hekari Central Cup trophy with his three brothers, earning the tournament's Most Valuable Player award as well.

He played for Wantoks FC.

He played for Hekari United F.C.

He is a Papua New Guinea International.

== International career ==
=== International goals ===
Scores and results list Papua New Guinea's goal tally first.

No.	Date	Venue	Opponent	Score	Result	Competition
1.	8 July 2019	National Soccer Stadium, Apia, Samoa	Samoa	1–0	6–0	2019 Pacific Games
2.	8 July 2019	National Soccer Stadium, Apia, Samoa	Samoa	2–0	6–0	2019 Pacific Games
3.	8 July 2019	National Soccer Stadium, Apia, Samoa	Samoa	3–0	6–0	2019 Pacific Games
4.	20 July 2019	National Soccer Stadium, Apia, Samoa	Fiji	1–0	1–1 (2–4 p)	2019 Pacific Games

== Honours ==
Papua New Guinea

- MSG Prime Minister's Cup: 2022, 2024
