= Simione Tamanisau =

Fijian footballer

Personal information
- Full name: Simione Moci Tamanisau
- Date of birth: 5 June 1982 (age 44)
- Place of birth: Laasa Hospital, Fiji
- Height: 1.87 m (6 ft 2 in)
- Positions: Goalkeeper; striker

Senior career*
Years	Team	Apps	(Gls)
2003–2004	Rewa		
2005–2006	Navua		
2006	→ Nokia Eagles (loan)		
2007	Rewa		
2008–2009	Navua		
2010–2012	Rewa		
2010	→ Hekari United (loan)		
2012–2013	Lautoka		
2014–2018	Rewa	9	(1)
2018–2019	Suva	22	(2)
2020-2021	Rewa	8	(0)
2022	Tailevu Naitasiri	10	(0)
2022-	Labasa	18	(0)

International career^{‡}
2003–2004	Fiji U23		
2003–	Fiji	39	(0)
Medal record
Men's football
Representing Fiji
OFC Nations Cup
Third place	2008 Oceania
Pacific Games
Gold medal – first place	2003 Fiji
Silver medal – second place	2007 Samoa
Bronze medal – third place	2019 Samoa
Pacific Mini Games
Silver medal – second place	2017 Vanuatu
- * Club domestic league appearances and goals ‡ National team caps and goals as of 31 July 2019

Simione Tamanisau (born 5 June 1982) is a Fijian international footballer, who plays as a goalkeeper and striker for Suva in the National Football League.

== Club career ==
Tamanisau has spent his entire domestic career so far in his native Fiji. During the 2010–11 season, Tamanisau had a loan spell in Papua New Guinea with Hekari United.

He is mostly used as a goalkeeper but able to play as a striker when needed. On 19 October 2016, he scored the winning goal for Rewa in their 2–1 victory against Suva in the National Football League match.

== International career ==
Tamanisau earned his first call-up to the Fiji national football team in 2003, during his inaugural season. He won five caps that year. The following year, he played in his first FIFA World Cup qualifying match when he kept goal in the 4–2 victory over Papua New Guinea on 12 May 2004. He played another five matches in the qualification campaign for the 2006 World Cup, conceding 11 goals in total. He made a further two appearances for the team in 2005, and the team did not play during 2006.

During qualification for the 2010 World Cup in South Africa, Tamanisau became embroiled in controversy when he was denied entry to New Zealand to play a Second Qualifying Round tie. He was stopped at customs because his father-in-law, a military police officer, had been involved in the 2006 Fijian coup d'état. The match was eventually postponed with Fiji refusing to play without their first-choice goalkeeper. On 19 November 2008, the game was played with Fiji emerging 2–0 winners. Following this match, Tamanisau spent over two years out of the Fiji team before returning to make seven more appearances for his country during 2011.

On 16 July 2016, Tamanisau was selected by the Fiji under-23 team for the 2016 Summer Olympics as one of three overage players.

In 2019, he was selected for the 2019 Pacific Games. Fiji won a bronze medal.

== International career statistics ==
As of 31 July 2019

Fiji national team
Year	Apps	Goals
2003	5	0
2004	6	0
2005	2	0
2007	6	0
2008	1	0
2011	7	0
2012	3	0
2016	1	0
2017	6	0
2019	2	0
Total	39	0

== Honours ==
Fiji

- OFC Nations Cup: 3rd place, 2008
- Pacific Games: Gold Medalist, 2003; Silver Medalist, 2007; Bronze Medalist, 2019
- Pacific Mini Games: Silver Medalist, 2017
