= Kishan Sami =

Fijian footballer

Personal information
- Full name: Kishan Ravinesh Sami
- Date of birth: 13 March 2000 (age 26)
- Place of birth: Varadoli, Ba, Fiji
- Position: Right back

Team information
- Current team: Rewa

Youth career
- –2017: Ba

Senior career*
| Years | Team | Apps | (Gls) |
| 2017–2019 | Ba | 29 | (2) |
| 2020 | Manukau United | 8 | (0) |
| 2021– | Rewa | 0 | (0) |

International career^{‡}
| 2017 | Fiji U17 | 2 | (0) |
| 2018– | Fiji U20 | 3 | (1) |
| 2019 | Fiji U23 | 5 | (0) |
| 2018– | Fiji | 13 | (1) |
Medal record
Men's football
Representing Fiji
Pacific Games
| Bronze medal – third place | 2019 Samoa |
| Bronze medal – third place | 2023 Solomon Islands |
- * Club domestic league appearances and goals ‡ National team caps and goals as of 31 July 2019

Kishan Sami (born 13 March 2000) is a Fijian footballer who plays as a right back for Fiji Premier League club Rewa and the Fiji national team.

== Club career ==
Sami started his career in the youth of Ba. In 2017 he made his debut for the first team. Soon after making his debut, Sami became a regular in the first 11. In 2018 he played all 3 matches in Ba's disappointing 2018 OFC Champions League campaign.

On 1 February 2020, Rakula went on a trial at Manukau United FC in New Zealand together with his teammate from Ba F.C. and the national team, Malakai Rakula. Both players signed a one-year deal with the club on 10 February 2020. They made their debut together on 13 March 2020 in a friendly match.

== National team ==
In 2018 Sami was called up by coach Christophe Gamel for the Fiji national football team. He made his debut on March 22, 2018, in a 3–2 loss against the Philippines. He came in for Narendra Rao in the 69th minute of play. In 2019, he was selected for the 2019 Pacific Games. Fiji won a bronze medal.

=== International goals ===
Scores and results list Fiji's goal tally first.

| No. | Date | Venue | Opponent | Score | Result | Competition |
|---|---|---|---|---|---|---|
| 1. | 15 July 2019 | National Soccer Stadium, Apia, Samoa | Tuvalu | 6–1 | 10–1 | 2019 Pacific Games |

== Honours ==
Fiji

- Pacific Games: Bronze Medalist, 2019, 2023
