= Nicholas Prasad =

Professional Canadian-Fijian footballer

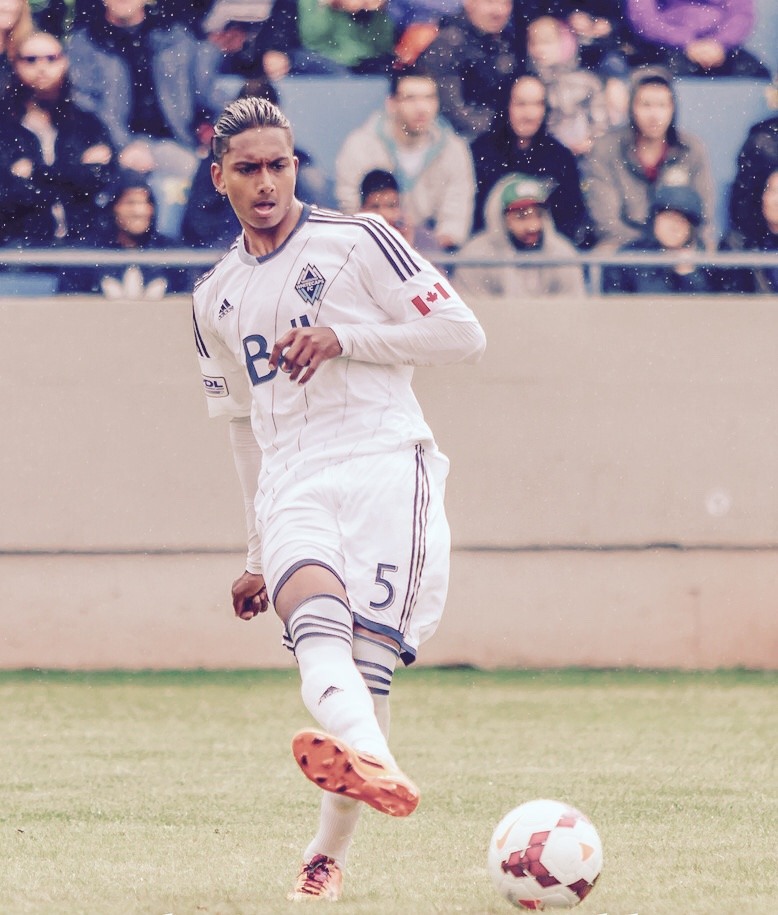
- Prasad playing for Vancouver Whitecaps FC in 2013

Personal information
- Full name: Nicholas Prasad
- Date of birth: 12 July 1995 (age 31)
- Place of birth: Edmonton, Alberta, Canada
- Height: 1.89 m (6 ft 2 in)
- Position: Defender

Youth career
- 2006: Whalley SC
- 2007–2012: Surrey United
- 2012–2014: Vancouver Whitecaps

Senior career*
Years	Team	Apps	(Gls)
2014	Vancouver Whitecaps FC	5	(1)
2014–2018	Seattle Redhawks	61	(2)
2018–2019	SpVgg Bayreuth	3	(0)
2019	Tulsa Roughnecks	1	(0)
2020–2021	Bischofswerdaer FV 08	11	(0)

International career^{‡}
2019	Fiji	11	(0)
Medal record
Men's football
Representing Fiji
Pacific Games
Bronze medal – third place	2019 Samoa
- * Club domestic league appearances and goals as of 2 February 2022 ‡ National team caps and goals as of 20 July 2019

Nicholas Prasad (born 7 December 1995) is a professional footballer who plays as a defender. Born in Canada, he has represented the Fiji national football team.

== Personal life ==
Prasad was born in Edmonton, Alberta to parents from Fiji.

== Career ==
=== BC Soccer Provincial Development Program ===
Prasad participated in the British Columbia Soccer Association Development Program from 2008 to 2011. He captained the team to a bronze medal match win against Alberta at the National Tournament and was later invited to the Canadian Youth National Team.

=== Enver Creek Secondary ===
Prasad attended Enver Creek Secondary, where he captained the school team to its first British Columbia School Sports Championship in 2012. He was also named Enver Creek Secondary Student-Athlete of the Year award from 2008 to 2011.

=== Vancouver Whitecaps FC ===
In 2012, Prasad joined the Vancouver Whitecaps FC Academy. He helped the academy side win the U.S. Soccer Development Academy Northwest Division regular-season title and qualify for the USSDA Finals in Houston. In 2013, he captained the team to a second-place finish in the USSDA Northwest Division. In 2014, Prasad appeared for USL PDL side Vancouver Whitecaps FC U-23. He scored his first goal for the team in a 2-2 draw against Portland Timbers at Providence Park. He later made his senior team debut for Vancouver Whitecaps FC, coming on as a substitute for Ethen Sampson in the 45th minute against FC Edmonton.

=== Seattle Redhawks ===
In 2014, Prasad signed a letter of intent to play NCAA Division I college soccer at Seattle University. During his sophomore season, the 11th-ranked Seattle Redhawks defeated the UCLA Bruins, 1–0, at Championship Field to advance to the round of 16 of the NCAA Division I men's soccer tournament for the first time in program history. Prasad recorded an assist in the match and was named to the TopDrawerSoccer Team of the week. He made 61 appearances for the Seattle Redhawks men's soccer team.

=== SpVgg Bayreuth ===
In 2018, Prasad signed with Regionalliga club SpVgg Bayreuth in Germany. He made his home debut at Hans-Walter-Wild-Stadion in a 2–0 loss against SpVgg Greuther Fürth. He recorded his first assist for the club in a derby match against Bayern Hof in the Bavarian Cup.

=== Tulsa Roughnecks FC ===
On July 16, 2019, Prasad was acquired by the USL Championship side Tulsa Roughnecks, for an undisclosed fee. He made his USL Championship debut in a 1–0 win at H-E-B Park against Rio Grande Valley FC Toros.

=== Bischofswerdaer FV 08 ===
In January 2020, Prasad signed for Regionalliga Nordost club Bischofswerdaer FV 08. He made his debut against FSV Union Fürstenwalde in a 2–0 loss.

== International career ==
In 2019, Prasad was called into the Fiji national football team for official FIFA International friendlies against New Caledonia and Mauritius. On March 18, 2019, he made his debut against New Caledonia, recording an assist in the 3–0 win. Prasad has been a regular in Christophe Gamel's side since his debut. Later in 2019, Prasad was selected for the 2019 Pacific Games in Samoa, where Fiji won a bronze medal.

== Honours ==
Fiji

- Pacific Games: Bronze Medalist, 2019
