= Emmanuel Simon =

Papua New Guinean footballer

Personal information
- Date of birth: 25 December 1992 (age 33)
- Place of birth: Lae, Papua New Guinea
- Height: 1.68 m (5 ft 6 in)
- Position: Midfielder

Team information
- Current team: Lae City FC

Senior career*
Years	Team	Apps	(Gls)
2013–2014	Gigira Laitepo Morobe		
2014–2016	PRK Hekari United		
2017–????	Lae City FC		
2025–	Bendigo City		

International career^{‡}
2011	Papua New Guinea U20	3	(0)
2014–	Papua New Guinea	41	(4)
Medal record
Men's football
Representing Papua New Guinea
OFC Nations Cup
Runner-up	2016 Papua New Guinea
MSG Prime Minister's Cup
Winner	2022 Vanuatu
Winner	2024 Solomon Islands
Runner-up	2025 Papua New Guinea
- * Club domestic league appearances and goals ‡ National team caps and goals as of 21 December 2024

Emmanuel Simon (born 25 December 1992) is a Papua New Guinean footballer who plays as a midfielder for Lae City FC in the Papua New Guinea National Soccer League. He is the most capped player of Papua New Guinea national football team.

Along with fellow Papua New Guinea international Yagi Yasasa, he joined Australian side Bendigo City in March 2025.

== International career ==
=== International goals ===
Scores and results list Papua New Guinea's goal tally first.

No.	Date	Venue	Opponent	Score	Result	Competition
1.	10 July 2019	National Soccer Stadium, Apia, Samoa	Vanuatu	2–0	2–0	2019 Pacific Games
2.	18 July 2019	National Soccer Stadium, Apia, Samoa	Tonga	4–0	8–0	2019 Pacific Games
3.	18 July 2019	National Soccer Stadium, Apia, Samoa	Tonga	5–0	8–0	2019 Pacific Games
4.	18 July 2019	National Soccer Stadium, Apia, Samoa	Tonga	8–0	8–0	2019 Pacific Games

== Honours ==
Papua New Guinea

- OFC Nations Cup: runner-up, 2016
- MSG Prime Minister's Cup: 2022, 2024; runner-up, 2025
