= Remueru Tekiate =

Fijian footballer

Personal information
- Full name: Remueru Tekiate
- Date of birth: 7 August 1990 (age 36)
- Height: 1.83 m (6 ft 0 in)
- Position: Defender

Team information
- Current team: Suva
- Number: 5

Senior career*
Years	Team	Apps	(Gls)
2008–2014	Ba		
2014–2016	Hekari United		
2016–2017	Labasa		
2017–2018	Ba		
2018–	Suva		

International career^{‡}
2012	Fiji U23	5	(0)
2012–	Fiji	26	(1)
Medal record
Men's football
Representing Fiji
Pacific Games
Bronze medal – third place	2019 Samoa
Pacific Mini Games
Silver medal – second place	2017 Vanuatu
MSG Prime Minister's Cup
Third place	2022 Vanuatu
- * Club domestic league appearances and goals as of 30 September 2017 ‡ National team caps and goals as of 20 July 2019

Remueru Tekiate is a Fijian footballer who plays as a defender for Suva After moving in from Ba in 2018.

== International career ==
=== International goals ===
Scores and results list Fiji's goal tally first.

No.	Date	Venue	Opponent	Score	Result	Competition
1.	15 July 2019	National Soccer Stadium, Apia, Samoa	Tuvalu	1–0	10–1	2019 Pacific Games
2.	24 September 2022	Korman Stadium, Port Vila, Vanuatu	Solomon Islands	2–2	2–2	2022 MSG Prime Minister's Cup

== Honours ==
Fiji

- Pacific Games: Bronze Medalist, 2019
- Pacific Mini Games: Silver Medalist, 2017
- MSG Prime Minister's Cup: 3rd place, 2022
