= Narendra Rao =

Fijian footballer

Personal information
- Full name: Narendra Junior Rao
- Date of birth: 27 June 1995 (age 31)
- Place of birth: Fiji
- Height: 1.72 m (5 ft 8 in)
- Position: Attacking midfielder

Team information
- Current team: Ba
- Number: 17

Youth career
- Ba

Senior career*
Years	Team	Apps	(Gls)
2012–	Ba		

International career^{‡}
2011	Fiji U-17	4	(2)
2013–2015	Fiji U-20	12	(1)
2017–	Fiji	4	(0)
Medal record
Men's football
Representing Fiji
OFC U-20 Championship
Winner	2014 Fiji
Runner-up	2013 Fiji
Pacific Mini Games
Silver medal – second place	2017 Vanuatu
- * Club domestic league appearances and goals as of 15 December 2017 ‡ National team caps and goals as of 2 September 2017

Junior Narendra Rao (born 27 June 1995) is a Fijian footballer who plays as a midfielder for Ba in the Fiji National Football League.

Rao was educated at FSC Primary School and Ba Sangam College.

== Career ==
Rao started playing football when he was in secondary school. He joined Ba when he was 14 years old and he made his debut in 2012 when he was 16 years old.

== International career ==
Rao made his debut in the Fiji jersey at the 2011 OFC U-17 Championship. This tournament was unsuccessful for Fiji as they managed to win only one time, a 9–0 victory against American Samoa. Rao managed to score two goals himself. After the U17's Rao went on to play with U20's, something that turned out to be a little bit more successful. In 2013 they only managed a second spot, however at the 2014 OFC U-20 Championship they reached the first place. This meant that they had qualified for the 2015 FIFA U-20 World Cup. It was the first time that Fiji had qualified for a FIFA event. Rao played all games at the U20 World Cup, including in Fiji's historical 3–0 victory against Honduras. In August 2017 he was called up for the Fijian national football team for two friendly matches in Indonesia. He made his debut on September 2, 2017 in a 0-0 draw against the Indonesia national football team.

In July 2019 he was one of three players suspended for failing to turn up to the training camp to prepare for the 2019 Pacific Games.

== Honours ==
Fiji

- Pacific Mini Games: Silver Medalist, 2017

Fiji U20

- OFC U-20 Championship: 2014; Runner-up, 2013
