= Jean-Gilles Hnamuko =

New Caledonian footballer (born 1996)

Personal information
- Full name: Jean-Gilles Hmejezie Henri Hnamuko
- Date of birth: 2 March 1996 (age 30)
- Place of birth: Nouméa, New Caledonia
- Height: 1.99 m (6 ft 6 in)
- Position: Goalkeeper

Team information
- Current team: Ne Drehu
- Number: 1

Youth career
- –2014: AS Mont-Dore
- 2014: US Bezons

Senior career*
Years	Team	Apps	(Gls)
2014	AS Lössi		
2014–2016	Racing Colombes		
2016–2017	Roye-Noyon		
2017–2018	Águeda	0	(0)
2018–2020	Swift Hesperange		
2020	Jeunesse Junglinster	2	(0)
2020–2021	RJ Freylange		
2021–2023	Alisontia Steinsel		
2023–	Ne Drehu		

International career^{‡}
- New Caledonia U17
2019–	New Caledonia	2	(0)
Medal record
Men's football
Representing New Caledonia
Pacific Games
Runner-up	2019 Samoa
- * Club domestic league appearances and goals as of 20 September 2023 ‡ National team caps and goals as of 23 March 2023

Jean-Gilles Hmejezie Henri Hnamuko (born 2 March 1996) is a New Caledonian international footballer who plays as a goalkeeper for New Caledonian club Ne Drehu.

== Honours ==
New Caledonia

- Pacific Games: runner-up 2019
