= Cédric Sansot =

New Caledonian footballer (born 1989)

Personal information
- Full name: Cédric Claude André Sansot
- Date of birth: 13 April 1989 (age 37)
- Place of birth: New Caledonia
- Height: 1.88 m (6 ft 2 in)
- Position: Midfielder

Team information
- Current team: Hienghène Sport
- Number: 6

Senior career*
Years	Team	Apps	(Gls)
2016–2018	AS Magenta		
2018–2019	Tiga Sport		
2019–	Hienghène Sport		

International career^{‡}
2016–	New Caledonia	17	(0)
Medal record
Men's football
Representing New Caledonia
Pacific Games
Silver medal – second place	2019 Samoa
- * Club domestic league appearances and goals as of 25 June 2016 ‡ National team caps and goals as of 31 July 2019

Cédric Claude André Sansot, also written as Cédrick (born 13 April 1989) is a New Caledonian footballer who plays as a midfielder for Hienghène Sport in the New Caledonia Super Ligue.

== Honours ==
New Caledonia

- Pacific Games: Silver Medalist, 2019
