= Didier Simane =

New Caledonian footballer (born 1996)

Personal information
- Full name: Didier Simane
- Date of birth: 3 August 1996 (age 30)
- Place of birth: New Caledonia
- Position: Midfielder

Team information
- Current team: Magenta
- Number: 8

Senior career*
| Years | Team | Apps | (Gls) |
| –2014 | Qanono Sport | | |
| 2014–2015 | Sud Nivernais Imphy Decize | | |
| 2015–2016 | Lupa Roma | 0 | (0) |
| 2016– | Magenta | | |

International career^{‡}
| 2013 | New Caledonia U17 | 4 | (0) |
| 2014–2015 | New Caledonia U20 | 4 | (0) |
| 2017– | New Caledonia | 5 | (0) |
Medal record
Men's football
Representing New Caledonia
Pacific Games
| Silver medal – second place | 2019 Samoa |
- * Club domestic league appearances and goals ‡ National team caps and goals as of 31 July 2019

Didier Simane (born 3 August 1996) is a New Caledonian footballer who plays as a midfielder for Magenta in the New Caledonia Super Ligue and the New Caledonia national football team. He made his debut for the national team on 7 June 2017, in a 2–2 draw against Fiji.

== Honours ==
New Caledonia

- Pacific Games: Silver Medalist, 2019
