= Kavaia Rawaqa =

Fijian footballer

Personal information
- Date of birth: 20 September 1990 (age 36)
- Place of birth: Fiji
- Position: Defender

Team information
- Current team: Lautoka
- Number: 8

Senior career*
Years	Team	Apps	(Gls)
2010–2013	Labasa		
2014–2015	Lautoka		
2015	Nadi		
2015–2017	Labasa		
2017–	Lautoka	10	

International career^{‡}
2012	Fiji U23	3	(0)
2017–	Fiji	21	(0)
Medal record
Men's football
Representing Fiji
Pacific Games
Bronze medal – third place	2019 Samoa
Pacific Mini Games
Silver medal – second place	2017 Vanuatu
- * Club domestic league appearances and goals as of 1 August 2017 ‡ National team caps and goals as of 31 July 2019

Kavaia Rawaqa (born 20 September 1990) is a Fijian footballer who plays as a defender for Fijian club Lautoka and the Fiji national team.

== Club career ==
Rawaqa started his career with Labasa. After he played for Lautoka, Nadi, again Labasa, he now plays for Lautoka. With the club, he won the 2017 Fiji National Football League.

== International career ==
In 2012 Rawaqa was called up for the 2012 OFC Men's Olympic Qualifying Tournament. Fiji reached the final but lost by 1 goal to nil against New Zealand. Rawaqa didn't play in the final and semi-final but he was in the starting line up in all three group games against the Solomon Islands (2–0 win), American Samoa (7–1 win) and Vanuatu (2–1 win). In 2017 Rawaqa was called up by coach Christophe Gamel for the Fiji national football team. He made his debut on 27 March 2017, in a 2–0 loss to New Zealand when he played the whole game as a left back.

== Honours ==
Fiji

- Pacific Games: Bronze Medalist, 2019
- Pacific Mini Games: Silver Medalist, 2017
