= Zibraaz Sahib =

Fijian footballer

Personal information
- Date of birth: 9 September 1989 (age 37)
- Place of birth: Fiji
- Position: Midfielder

Team information
- Current team: Lautoka
- Number: 3

Senior career*
Years	Team	Apps	(Gls)
2010–	Lautoka		(8)

International career
2012	Fiji U23	5	(2)
2015–	Fiji	14	(0)
Medal record
Men's football
Representing Fiji
Pacific Games
Bronze medal – third place	2019 Samoa
- * Club domestic league appearances and goals

Zibraaz Sahib, sometimes wrote as Zibraz, (born 9 September 1989) is a Fijian footballer who plays as a midfielder for Fijian club Lautoka and the Fiji national team.

== Club career ==
Sahib started his career in the youth of Lautoka. In 2010 he moved to the first team and made his debut and he is still playing for the club up to today.

== International career ==
In 2015 Sahib was called up by for the Fiji national football team to play a friendly against Tonga national football team. He made his debut on 19 August 2015, in a 5–0 victory against Tonga.

== Honours ==
Fiji

- Pacific Games: Bronze Medalist, 2019
