= Tutizama Tanito =

Solomon Islands footballer (born 1993)

Personal information
- Date of birth: 27 November 1993 (age 32)
- Place of birth: Solomon Islands
- Position: Forward

Team information
- Current team: Henderson Eels
- Number: 10

Youth career
- Marist Fire

Senior career*
Years	Team	Apps	(Gls)
2010	Marist		
2011–2015	Hekari United		
2015	Solomon Warriors		
2016	Hekari United		
2017	Henderson Eels		
2018	Marist		
2018–2019	Henderson Eels		
2019	Hekari United		

International career
2011	Solomon Islands U20	4	(0)
2011	Solomon Islands U23	2	(0)
2012–	Solomon Islands	17	(4)
Medal record
Men's football
Representing Solomon Islands
Pacific Mini Games
Bronze medal – third place	2017 Vanuatu
- * Club domestic league appearances and goals

Tutizama Tanito (born 27 November 1993) is a Solomon Islands professional footballer who plays as a forward. Tanito has represented the Solomon Islands national football team.

== International career ==
=== International goals ===
Scores and results list the Solomon Islands' goal tally first.

#	Date	Venue	Opponent	Score	Result	Competition
1.	12 October 2012	Lawson Tama Stadium, Honiara	New Caledonia	1–1	2–6	2014 FIFA World Cup qualification
2.	2 December 2017	Port Vila Municipal Stadium, Port Vila	Tonga	6–0	8–0	2017 Pacific Mini Games
3.	8 July 2019	National Soccer Stadium, Apia	Tuvalu	10–0	13–0	2019 Pacific Games
4.	8 July 2019	National Soccer Stadium, Apia	Tuvalu	13–0	13–0	2019 Pacific Games

== Honours ==
Solomon Islands

- Pacific Mini Games: Bronze Medalist, 2017
