= Elkington Molivakarua =

Ni-Vanuatu footballer

Personal information
- Date of birth: 3 March 1993 (age 33)
- Positions: Midfielder; forward

Senior career*
Years	Team	Apps	(Gls)
2015–2016	Hekari United		
2017	Tupuji Imere		
2018–	Erakor Golden Star		

International career^{‡}
2017–	Vanuatu	13	(3)
Medal record
Men's football
Representing Vanuatu
Pacific Mini Games
Gold medal – first place	2017 Vanuatu
MSG Prime Minister's Cup
Third place	2023 New Caledonia
- * Club domestic league appearances and goals as of 26 April 2018 ‡ National team caps and goals as of 31 July 2019

Elkington Molivakarua (born 3 March 1993) is a Ni-Vanuatu international footballer who plays for Port Vila Football League side Erakor Golden Star.

== International career ==
Molivakarua made his senior international debut on 23 November 2017 in a 1-0 friendly defeat to Estonia. He scored his first senior international goal on 12 December 2017, netting in the 60th minute of a 10–0 victory over Tuvalu at the 2017 Pacific Mini Games.

== Career statistics ==
=== Club ===
As of 26 April 2018.

Club	Season	League			Cup		Continental		Other		Total	
Club	Season	Division	Apps	Goals	Apps	Goals	Apps	Goals	Apps	Goals	Apps	Goals
Hekari United	2015–16	Papua New Guinea National Soccer League	—		—		1 (Note: Appearances in the OFC Champions League)	0	—		1	0
Erakor Golden Star	2017–18	Port Vila Football League	—		—		3	1	— (Note: Appearances in the VFF National Super League)		3	1
Career total			—		—		4	1	—		4	1

=== International ===
As of matches played 21 February 2019.

National team	Year	Apps	Goals
Vanuatu	2017	5	2
Vanuatu	2018	2	0
Total		7	2

=== International goals ===
Scores and results list Vanuatu's goal tally first.

No	Date	Venue	Opponent	Score	Result	Competition
1.	12 December 2017	Port Vila Municipal Stadium, Port Vila, Vanuatu	Tuvalu	4–0	10–0	2017 Pacific Mini Games
2.	15 December 2017	Port Vila Municipal Stadium, Port Vila, Vanuatu	Solomon Islands	2–1	3–2	2017 Pacific Mini Games
3.	15 July 2019	National Soccer Stadium, Apia, Samoa	Tonga	1–0	14–0	2019 Pacific Games

== Honours ==
=== Player ===
Vanuatu

- Pacific Mini Games: Gold Medalist, 2017
- MSG Prime Minister's Cup: 3rd place, 2023
