= Beniamino Mateinaqara =

Fijian footballer

Personal information
- Date of birth: 19 August 1987 (age 39)
- Place of birth: Taveuni, Fiji
- Height: 1.83 m (6 ft 0 in)
- Position: Goalkeeper

Team information
- Current team: Lautoka

Senior career*
Years	Team	Apps	(Gls)
2007–2010	Nadi		
2011–2012	Navua		
2013–2015	Nadi		
2015	Hekari United		
2016	Suva		
2017–	Lautoka	61	(0)

International career
2007–2019	Fiji	23	(0)
Medal record
Men's football
Representing Fiji
OFC Nations Cup
Third place	2008 Oceania
Pacific Games
Silver medal – second place	2007 Samoa
Bronze medal – third place	2019 Samoa
- * Club domestic league appearances and goals as of 28 July 2017

Beniamino Mateinaqara (born 19 August 1987) is a Fijian footballer who plays as a goalkeeper for Lautoka in the Fijian National Football League.

== Career statistics ==
=== International ===
Appearances and goals by national team and year
National team	Year	Apps	Goals
Fiji	2007	2	0
Fiji	2008	2	0
Fiji	2009	–	
Fiji	2010	–	
Fiji	2011	3	0
Fiji	2012	–	
Fiji	2013	–	
Fiji	2014	–	
Fiji	2015	2	0
Fiji	2016	3	0
Fiji	2017	3	0
Fiji	2018	–	
Fiji	2019	8	0
Total		23	0

== Honours ==
Fiji

- OFC Nations Cup: 3rd place, 2008
- Pacific Games: Silver Medalist, 2007; Bronze Medalist, 2019
