= Emile Béaruné =

New Caledonian footballer (born 1990)

Personal information
- Full name: Emile Wabé Béaruné
- Date of birth: 7 February 1990 (age 36)
- Place of birth: New Caledonia
- Height: 1.86 m (6 ft 1 in)
- Position: Defender

Team information
- Current team: Hienghène Sport
- Number: 27

Senior career*
Years	Team	Apps	(Gls)
2010–2016	Gaïtcha		
2016–2019	Horizon Patho		
2019–	Hienghène Sport		

International career^{‡}
2010–	New Caledonia	42	(0)
Medal record
Men's football
Representing New Caledonia
OFC Nations Cup
Runner-up	2012 Solomon Islands
Pacific Games
Gold medal – first place	2011 New Caledonia
Silver medal – second place	2019 Samoa
- * Club domestic league appearances and goals as of 30 May 2016 ‡ National team caps and goals as of 21 March 2022

Emile Wabé Béaruné (born 7 February 1990) is a New Caledonian international footballer who plays as a defender for Hienghène Sport in the New Caledonia Super Ligue and the New Caledonia national team.

== Honours ==
New Caledonia

- OFC Nations Cup: Runner-up, 2012
- Pacific Games: Gold Medalist, 2011; Silver medalist, 2019
