= Alwin Hou =

Solomon Islands footballer

Alvin Hou
Personal information
- Full name: Alvin Hou
- Date of birth: 18 September 1996 (age 30)
- Place of birth: Solomon Islands
- Positions: Midfielder; forward

Team information
- Current team: Kossa
- Number: 14

Youth career
- Real Kakamora

Senior career*
Years	Team	Apps	(Gls)
2015–2017	Real Kakamora		
2017–2018	FC Guadalcanal		
2018–2019	Solomon Warriors		
2019–	Kossa		

International career^{‡}
2014–	Solomon Islands Futsal	20	(5)
2018–	Solomon Islands	21	(6)
Medal record
Representing Solomon Islands
Pacific Games
Silver medal – second place	2023 Solomon Islands
MSG Prime Minister's Cup
Winner	2023 New Caledonia
Third place	2024 Solomon Islands
- * Club domestic league appearances and goals as of 25 August 2018 ‡ National team caps and goals as of 28 November 2023

Alvin Hou, sometimes spelled as Alwin (born 18 September 1996) is a footballer and futsal player from the Solomon Islands. He plays as a forward for the Kossa in the Telekom S-League and the Solomon Islands national futsal team.

== Club career ==
Hou came through the youth ranks of Real Kakamora and made his debut for the club in 2015. In 2017 he transferred to FC Guadalcanal. A year later he moved to Solomon top club the Solomon Warriors. After one season he moved to Kossa.

== International career ==
Hou made his debut for the Solomon Islands national futsal team on September 18, 2017 in a 4-3 victory against Chinese Taipei. He has played at the 2016 FIFA Futsal World Cup.

=== International goals ===
Scores and results list Solomon Islands' goal tally first.

No.	Date	Venue	Opponent	Score	Result	Competition
1.	29 August 2018	Estádio Campo Desportivo, Taipa, Macau	Macau	3–0	4–1	Friendly
2.	8 July 2019	National Soccer Stadium, Apia, Samoa	Tuvalu	12–0	13–0	2019 Pacific Games
3.	17 March 2022	Al-Arabi Stadium, Doha, Qatar	Cook Islands	2–0	2–0	2022 FIFA World Cup qualification
4.	27 March 2022	Al-Arabi Stadium, Doha, Qatar	Papua New Guinea	1–0	3–2	2022 FIFA World Cup qualification
5.	27 March 2022	Al-Arabi Stadium, Doha, Qatar	Papua New Guinea	2–1	3–2	2022 FIFA World Cup qualification
6.	21 September 2022	Luganville Soccer Stadium, Luganville, Vanuatu	New Caledonia	1–0	1–0	2022 MSG Prime Minister's Cup

== Honours ==
Solomon Islands

- Pacific Games: Silver Medalist, 2023
- MSG Prime Minister's Cup: 2023; 3rd place, 2024
