= Rivalina Fuimaono =

New Zealand international footballer

Rivalina Fuimaono (born ~1997) is a New Zealand-Samoan footballer. She plays as a goalkeeper. She has represented New Zealand internationally at Futsal, and has been a member of the Samoa women's national football team.

Fuimaono was educated at Mount Albert Grammar School in Auckland, New Zealand. She began playing football at the age of thirteen for Three Kings United in the Auckland Premier League. She captained the Mt Albert Grammar girls team in 2014, ending the season with a clean sheet. She later played for Papatoetoe AFC, AUT, and Auckland United FC, as well as in the Women’s Futsal Superleague.

In 2015 she was asked to play football for Samoa at the 2015 Pacific Games, but turned down the offer.

In August 2017 she was selected for the first ever Futsal Ferns team. In 2018 she was named to the NZ University Women’s Futsal Team for the 2018 FISU World University Futsal Championship in Kazakhstan.

In June 2019 she was named to the Samoa women's national football team for the 2019 Pacific Games.
