= Malakai Rakula =

Fijian footballer

Personal information
- Full name: Malakai Rakula
- Date of birth: 16 May 1992 (age 34)
- Place of birth: Rotuma, Fiji
- Position: Midfielder

Team information
- Current team: Manukau United

Senior career*
Years	Team	Apps	(Gls)
–2013	Suva		
2013–2016	Nadi		
2016–2019	Ba		
2020–	Manukau United		

International career
2011	Fiji U20	2	(0)
2019–	Fiji	7	(3)
Medal record
Men's football
Representing Fiji
Pacific Games
Bronze medal – third place	2019 Samoa
- * Club domestic league appearances and goals

Malakai Rakula (born 16 May 1992) is a Fijian footballer who plays as a midfielder for Manukau United in New Zealand and the Fiji national team.

== Club career ==
Rakula started his career with Suva. After a stint with Nadi he plays for Ba since 2016. With both Nadi and Ba he has played in the OFC Champions League.

On 1 February 2020, Rakula went on a trial at Manukau United FC in New Zealand together with his teammate from Ba F.C. and the national team, Kishan Sami. Both players signed a one-year deal with the club on 10 February 2020. Both players made their debut on 13 March 2020 in a friendly match.

== National team ==
Rakula was called up by coach Christophe Gamel in 2019 for the national football team. He made his debut on March 18, 2019, in a 3–0 win against New Caledonia. He started the game and was subbed after 75 minutes by Josateki Tamudu

=== International goals ===
Scores and results list Fiji's goal tally first.

No.	Date	Venue	Opponent	Score	Result	Competition
1.	10 July 2019	National Soccer Stadium, Apia, Samoa	American Samoa	3–0	9–0	2019 Pacific Games
2.	10 July 2019	National Soccer Stadium, Apia, Samoa	American Samoa	5–0	9–0	2019 Pacific Games
3.	15 July 2019	National Soccer Stadium, Apia, Samoa	Tuvalu	3–0	10–1	2019 Pacific Games

== Honours ==
Fiji

- Pacific Games: Bronze Medalist, 2019
