= Daniel Joe =

Papua New Guinean footballer

Personal information
- Full name: Daniel Joe
- Date of birth: 29 May 1990 (age 36)
- Place of birth: Papua New Guinea
- Height: 1.68 m (5 ft 6 in)
- Position: Defender

Team information
- Current team: Hekari United
- Number: 2

Senior career*
Years	Team	Apps	(Gls)
–2016	Hekari United		
2016	Marist Fire		
2017–	Hekari United		

International career^{‡}
2012	Papua New Guinea U23	4	(0)
2012–	Papua New Guinea	40	(0)
Medal record
Men's football
Representing Papua New Guinea
OFC Nations Cup
Runner-up	2016 Papua New Guinea
MSG Prime Minister's Cup
Winner	2022 Vanuatu
Winner	2024 Solomon Islands
Runner-up	2025 Papua New Guinea
- * Club domestic league appearances and goals ‡ National team caps and goals as of 21 December 2024

Daniel Joe (born 29 May 1990) is a Papua New Guinean football player. He is currently a member of Hekari United. He has made 33 appearances for the Papua New Guinea national football team, first appearing in 2012. He was selected for the Papua New Guinea squad at the 2024 OFC Men's Nations Cup.

== Honours ==
Papua New Guinea

- OFC Nations Cup: runner-up, 2016
- MSG Prime Minister's Cup: 2022, 2024; runner-up, 2025
