= Joseph Tchako =

New Caledonian footballer (born 1993)

Personal information
- Date of birth: 30 March 1993 (age 33)
- Place of birth: New Caledonia
- Position: Defender

Team information
- Current team: AS Tiga Sports

Senior career*
Years	Team	Apps	(Gls)
2013–2017	AS Mont-Dore		
2018–	AS Tiga Sports		

International career^{‡}
2015	New Caledonia U23	4	(0)
2016–	New Caledonia	11	(0)
Medal record
Men's football
Representing New Caledonia
Pacific Games
Gold medal – first place	2015 Papua New Guinea
Silver medal – second place	2019 Samoa
- * Club domestic league appearances and goals ‡ National team caps and goals as of 31 July 2019

Joseph Tchako (born 30 March 1993) is a New Caledonian footballer who plays as a defender for AS Tiga Sports.

== Honours ==
New Caledonia

- Pacific Games: Silver Medalist, 2019

New Caledonia U-23

- Pacific Games: Gold Medalist, 2015
