= Christopher Wasasala =

Fijian footballer

Personal information
- Full name: Christopher Frances Wasasala
- Date of birth: 31 December 1994 (age 31)
- Place of birth: Fiji
- Height: 1.72 m (5 ft 8 in)
- Position: Midfielder

Team information
- Current team: Bula FC

Senior career*
Years	Team	Apps	(Gls)
2013–2017	Labasa	13	(5)
2017–2018	Lautoka	1	(2)
2018	Labasa	6	(1)
2019–2021	Suva	28	(2)
2022–2025	Labasa	57	(26)
2026–	Bula FC	0	(0)

International career^{‡}
2015–2016	Fiji U23	8	(11)
2017–	Fiji	19	(9)
Medal record
Men's football
Representing Fiji
Pacific Games
Bronze medal – third place	2019 Samoa
Pacific Mini Games
Silver medal – second place	2017 Vanuatu
MSG Prime Minister's Cup
Runner-up	2024 Solomon Islands
Third place	2022 Vanuatu
- * Club domestic league appearances and goals ‡ National team caps and goals as of 10 December 2025

Christopher Wasasala (born 31 December 1994) is a Fijian footballer who plays as a midfielder for Fijian club Bula FC and the Fiji national team.

== Club career ==
Before joining Labasa Wasasala played his youth football with Labasa Muslim College. In 2012, at the age of 17, he joined Labasa Youth before making his debut for the first team in 2013. In 2017 he moved to Lautoka. In January 2018, he moved back to Labasa. In January 2018 he was called as one of the eleven biggest talents in Oceania according to OceaniaFC.com

== National team ==
In 2015 Wasasala was called up for the Fiji national under-23 football team to take part in the Four Nation’s Friendship Cup, where he won the golden boot by scoring two goals, and the 2015 Pacific Games. The Pacific games were a huge success for Fiji. Not only because they won by 38 goals to nil against the Federated States of Micronesia but also because they won the games in the final after penalty's against Vanuatu which meant that Fiji had qualified for the 2016 Summer Olympics for the first time in history. In January and February 2016, Wasasala joined the Fiji team for a preparation tour in Spain. After the tour however it was announced that Wasasala was not part of the final squad for the 2016 Summer Olympics. Wasasala made his debut for the Fiji national football team on May 25, 2017, in a 1–1 draw against the Solomon Islands. In 2019, he was selected for the 2019 Pacific Games. Fiji won a bronze medal.

=== International goals ===
Scores and results list Fiji's goal tally first.

No	Date	Venue	Opponent	Score	Result	Competition
1.	2 December 2017	Port Vila Municipal Stadium, Port Vila, Vanuatu	Tuvalu	1–0	8–0	2017 Pacific Mini Games
2.	2 December 2017	Port Vila Municipal Stadium, Port Vila, Vanuatu	Tuvalu	2–0	8–0	2017 Pacific Mini Games
3.	2 December 2017	Port Vila Municipal Stadium, Port Vila, Vanuatu	Tuvalu	7–0	8–0	2017 Pacific Mini Games
4.	2 December 2017	Port Vila Municipal Stadium, Port Vila, Vanuatu	Tuvalu	8–0	8–0	2017 Pacific Mini Games
5.	9 December 2017	Port Vila Municipal Stadium, Port Vila, Vanuatu	Vanuatu	1–0	1–1	2017 Pacific Mini Games
6.	10 July 2019	National Soccer Stadium, Apia, Samoa	American Samoa	4–0	9–0	2019 Pacific Games
7.	10 July 2019	National Soccer Stadium, Apia, Samoa	American Samoa	8–0	9–0	2019 Pacific Games
8.	15 July 2019	National Soccer Stadium, Apia, Samoa	Tuvalu	4–1	10–1	2019 Pacific Games
9.	15 July 2019	National Soccer Stadium, Apia, Samoa	Tuvalu	8–1	10–1	2019 Pacific Games
10.	30 September 2022	Korman Stadium, Port Vila, Vanuatu	Solomon Islands	1–0	1–0	2022 MSG Prime Minister's Cup

== Personal life ==
Wasasala hails from Nadawa, Suva and besides football is part of the Fiji Military Airforce.

== Honours ==
Fiji

- Pacific Games: Bronze Medalist, 2019
- Pacific Mini Games: Silver Medalist, 2017
- MSG Prime Minister's Cup: Runner-up, 2024; 3rd place, 2022
