= Cédric Decoire =

New Caledonian footballer (born 1994)

Personal information
- Full name: Cédric Robert Jean-Louis Decoire
- Date of birth: 15 May 1994 (age 32)
- Place of birth: New Caledonia
- Position: Midfielder

Team information
- Current team: AS Mont-Dore

Senior career*
Years	Team	Apps	(Gls)
2011–2014	Mont-Dore		
2014–2017	OFC Charleville		
2017–	Mont-Dore		

International career^{‡}
2011	New Caledonia U17	2	(1)
2013	New Caledonia U20	2	(1)
2015	New Caledonia U23	4	(1)
2018–	New Caledonia	8	(3)
Medal record
Men's football
Representing New Caledonia
Pacific Games
Gold medal – first place	2015 Papua New Guinea
Silver medal – second place	2019 Samoa
- * Club domestic league appearances and goals ‡ National team caps and goals as of 31 July 2019

Cédric Decoire (born 15 May 1994) is a New Caledonian footballer who plays as a midfielder for New Caledonian club AS Mont-Dore and the New Caledonian national team.

== Club career ==
Decoire started his career in the youth of AS Mont-Dore. After he made his debut in 2011 for the first team he played in the OFC Champions League of 2012 and 2013. In 2014 he moved to France to play for Ardennes clubsite OFC Charleville. In 2017 he moved to back to New Caledonia to play for AS Mont Dore again.

== National team ==
In 2018, Decoire was called up by coach Thierry Sardo for a friendly against Tahiti national football team. He played the whole 90 minutes in a 0 all draw on March 21, 2018.

=== International goals ===
Scores and results list New Caledonia's goal tally first.

No.	Date	Venue	Opponent	Score	Result	Competition
1.	18 July 2019	National Soccer Stadium, Apia, Samoa	Tuvalu	2–0	11–0	2019 Pacific Games
2.	18 July 2019	National Soccer Stadium, Apia, Samoa	Tuvalu	5–0	11–0	2019 Pacific Games
3.	18 July 2019	National Soccer Stadium, Apia, Samoa	Tuvalu	11–0	11–0	2019 Pacific Games

== Honours ==
New Caledonia

- Pacific Games: Silver Medalist, 2019

New Caledonia U-23

- Pacific Games: Gold Medalist, 2015
