= Stéphane Tein-Padom =

New Caledonian footballer (born 1994)

Personal information
- Full name: Stéphane Karl Tein-Padom
- Date of birth: 8 June 1994 (age 32)
- Place of birth: Nouméa, New Caledonia
- Position: Forward

Team information
- Current team: FC Balagne

Youth career
- 2010–2011: AS Grand Nord
- 2011–2012: Châteauroux

Senior career*
Years	Team	Apps	(Gls)
2012–2013	Châteauroux II	1	(0)
2013–2014	Porto Vecchio	15	(2)
2014–2018	Poitiers	1	(0)
2018–2019	Châtellerault	0	(0)
2019–	FC Balagne	8	(0)

International career^{‡}
2013	New Caledonia U17	4	(5)
2014	New Caledonia U20	3	(0)
2019–	New Caledonia	4	(1)
Medal record
Men's football
Representing New Caledonia
Pacific Games
Runner-up	2019 Samoa
- * Club domestic league appearances and goals as of 00:24, 23 January 2020 (UTC) ‡ National team caps and goals as of 18 July 2019

Stéphane Tein-Padom (born 8 June 1994) is a New Caledonian footballer who plays as a forward for FC Balagne.

== International career ==
=== International goals ===
Scores and results list New Caledonia's goal tally first.

No.	Date	Venue	Opponent	Score	Result	Competition
1.	18 July 2019	National Soccer Stadium, Apia, Samoa	Tuvalu	9–0	11–0	2019 Pacific Games

== Honours ==
New Caledonia

- Pacific Games: runner-up 2019
