= Jean-Philippe Saïko =

New Caledonian footballer (born 1990)

Personal information
- Full name: Jean-Philippe Saïko
- Date of birth: 20 August 1990 (age 36)
- Place of birth: Nouméa, New Caledonia, France
- Height: 1.77 m (5 ft 10 in)
- Position: Forward

Team information
- Current team: AS Magenta

Senior career*
Years	Team	Apps	(Gls)
2009–2013	AS Magenta		(11)
2013	Gaïtcha	20	(25)
2014–2015	FC Montaigu	12	(2)
2015	Vendée Poiré-sur-Vie II	14	(2)
2015–2018	Poitiers	41	(17)
2018–2019	Limoges	7	(0)
2019	AS Magenta		
2019–2021	Tasman United	14	(8)
2020–2021	→ AS Lössi (loan)		(10)
2022–	AS Magenta		

International career^{‡}
2016–	New Caledonia	9	(12)
Medal record
Men's football
Representing New Caledonia
Pacific Games
Silver medal – second place	2019 Samoa
- * Club domestic league appearances and goals ‡ National team caps and goals as of 24 March 2022

Jean-Philippe Saïko (born 20 August 1990) is a New Caledonian professional footballer who plays as a forward for New Caledonia Super Ligue club AS Magenta and the New Caledonia national team.

== Career statistics ==
As of match played 24 March 2022

Appearances and goals by national team and year
National team	Year	Apps	Goals
New Caledonia	2016	4	2
New Caledonia	2019	5	9
New Caledonia	2022	1	1
Total		10	12

Scores and results list New Caledonia's goal tally first, score column indicates score after each Saïko goal.

List of international goals scored by Jean-Philippe Saïko
No.	Date	Venue	Opponent	Score	Result	Competition	Ref.
1	29 May 2016	Sir John Guise Stadium, Port Moresby, Papua New Guinea	Papua New Guinea	1–1	1–1	2018 FIFA World Cup qualification	
2	22 June 2016	Stade Numa-Daly, Nouméa, New Caledonia	Malaysia	1–0	1–2	Friendly	
3	8 July 2019	National Soccer Stadium, Apia, Samoa	American Samoa	4–0	5–0	2019 Pacific Games	
4	8 July 2019	National Soccer Stadium, Apia, Samoa	American Samoa	5–0	5–0	2019 Pacific Games	
5	10 July 2019	National Soccer Stadium, Apia, Samoa	Solomon Islands	1–0	2–0	2019 Pacific Games	
6	10 July 2019	National Soccer Stadium, Apia, Samoa	Solomon Islands	2–0	2–0	2019 Pacific Games	
7	12 July 2019	National Soccer Stadium, Apia, Samoa	Fiji	1–0	1–0	2019 Pacific Games	
8	18 July 2019	National Soccer Stadium, Apia, Samoa	Tuvalu	1–0	11–0	2019 Pacific Games	
9	18 July 2019	National Soccer Stadium, Apia, Samoa	Tuvalu	3–0	11–0	2019 Pacific Games	
10	18 July 2019	National Soccer Stadium, Apia, Samoa	Tuvalu	6–0	11–0	2019 Pacific Games	
11	18 July 2019	National Soccer Stadium, Apia, Samoa	Tuvalu	7–0	11–0	2019 Pacific Games	
12	24 March 2022	Suheim bin Hamad Stadium, Doha, Qatar	New Zealand	1–1	1–7	2022 FIFA World Cup qualification	

== Honours ==
New Caledonia

- Pacific Games: Silver Medalist, 2019
