= Jorys Mène =

New Caledonian footballer (born 1995)

Personal information
- Full name: Jorys Mène
- Date of birth: 2 January 1995 (age 31)
- Place of birth: Amiens, France
- Position: Defender

Team information
- Current team: Alisontia Steinsel
- Number: 23

Youth career
- Amiens SC

Senior career*
Years	Team	Apps	(Gls)
2013–2014	Le Havre B	13	(0)
2014–2015	US Tourcoing	10	(0)
2015–2016	FC Ailly-sur-Somme Samara	0	(0)
2017–2018	Francs Borains		
2018–2020	FC Ailly-sur-Somme Samara		
2020–	Alisontia Steinsel		

International career^{‡}
2015	New Caledonia U23	4	(0)
2016–	New Caledonia	5	(0)
Medal record
Men's football
Representing New Caledonia
Pacific Games
Gold medal – first place	2015 Papua New Guinea
Silver medal – second place	2019 Samoa
- * Club domestic league appearances and goals as of 27 March 2017 ‡ National team caps and goals as of 31 July 2019

Jorys Mène (born 2 January 1995) is a New Caledonian footballer who plays as a defender for Alisontia Steinsel. He made his debut for the New Caledonia on 12 November 2016 in their 2–0 loss against New Zealand.

== Honours ==
New Caledonia

- Pacific Games: Silver Medalist, 2019

New Caledonia U-23

- Pacific Games: Gold Medalist, 2015
