= Ba FA =

Fijian football club

- Full name: Ba Football Association
- Nickname: Men In Black
- Founded: 1935; 91 years ago
- Ground: Govind Park, Ba
- Capacity: 13,500
- Chairman: Praneel Dayal
- Manager: Ravinesh Kumar
- League: National Football League
- 2025: FPL, 5th of 10
Home colours	Away colours

Ba Football Association (Ba FA) is a Fijian professional football club based in Ba that competes in the Fiji Premier League, the top flight of professional Fijian football. The club was founded in 1935. The club's home ground is the Govind Park.

Ba FA have won more trophies than any other club in Fijian football, with a record of 95 trophies: 22 Fiji Premier League, 26 Inter-District Championship, 9 Fiji FA Cup Tournament, 18 Battle Of Giants, 20 Champion versus Champion and is the only club in OFC to have won a quintuple (5 trophies) in a single season, achieving the feat in 2006. During the 2019 Fiji Premier League, Ba FA ended the campaign as champions without a single defeat – a record of 11 wins and 3 draws.

Fans gave the club the nickname MEN IN BLACK due to their all black home kit. A common phrase in Ba is BA TOH BA HAI which has since gone on to become the slogan for the club. The success this club has faced over the years has led to the town being informally known as Soccer Crazy Town, Ba.

Records include:

- Won Fiji Fact 4 in a row (2004-2007)
- Won BOG 4 in a row x2 (1998-2001) and (2006-2009)
- Won IDC 6 in a row (1975-1980)
- Won the National League 6 in a row (2001-2006)
- Won CVC 14 in a row (1993-2006)
- Clean sweep of all Fiji FA competitions in 2006
- Clean sweep of all major tournaments including league in 2026

== History ==
Ba Football Club was formed in 1935 as a street football club by local Fijians. This was due to the efforts and support from the Colonial Sugar Refining Company which owned a large sugar mill. In 1977, Ba Football Club became a professional club and became affiliated with the Fiji Football Association. In 1977, Ba participated in the 1977 Fiji National League which was the top tier of Fiji football. Ba were the winners of the first ever Fiji National League. In 1979, Ba won their second Fiji National League title and have since then won 22 league titles with their latest being in the 2026 season.

== Ba Football Association logo ==
Black is the predominant background color, symbolizing strength. It reflects the team’s identity through nicknames such as "Men in Black", "Boys in Black", "All Black", and "Black Magic". Gold represents the backdrop of hills—literally referencing Vatukoula in Ba's hinterland—also symbolizing achievement at a "gold" standard. It is used in the text showing the year of establishment, signifying years of excellence. The eleven stars radiating from the gold beneath the ball represent the players, the energy of the game, and the dynamic nature of football—bursting forth from Ba.

Blue symbolizes the Ba river, valley, and mountains that form the backdrop of entry into Ba. It reflects the richness of the Ba river, central to the area’s history and development. White is used in the official name, shown as a reverse highlight against the black background. White also appears in the uniform—on trims, shorts, and sock stripes. The placement of the text on either side of the Ba river symbolizes district unity. While the river divides, it also connects—bringing together land, water, and people on both sides. The text stretches out like a bridge—one that cannot be washed away—representing the unwavering support for Ba’s district football team.

== Current squad ==
Note: Flags indicate national team as defined under FIFA eligibility rules; some limited exceptions apply. Players may hold more than one non-FIFA nationality.

No.	Pos.	Nation	Player
1	GK	FIJ	Tevita Koroi
2	DF	FIJ	Ryan Naresh
3	DF	FIJ	Rahul Naresh
4	DF	FIJ	Malakai Rere
5	MF	FIJ	Kalaveti Sivoi
6	FW	FIJ	Ratu Dau
7	FW	SOL	Darold Kakasi
8	MF	FIJ	Sailasa Ratu
9	FW	FIJ	Raj Pillay
11	FW	FIJ	Gulam Razool

No.	Pos.	Nation	Player
12	DF	FIJ	Peceli Sukabula
13	MF	FIJ	Penisoni Tirau
14	MF	SOL	Ruel Grayven
15	DF	FIJ	Suliano Tawanakoro
16	MF	FIJ	Etonia Dogalau
17	DF	FIJ	Mohammed Raheem
18	DF	FIJ	Samuel Navoce
19	DF	FIJ	Mitieli Naiviro
20	GK	FIJ	Misiwani Nairube
22	GK	FIJ	Atunaisa Naucukidi

Squad for the 2019 OFC Champions League

Note: Flags indicate national team as defined under FIFA eligibility rules; some limited exceptions apply. Players may hold more than one non-FIFA nationality.

No.	Pos.	Nation	Player
1	GK	FIJ	Misiwane Nairube
2	MF	FIJ	Avinesh Waran Suwamy
3	FW	FIJ	Mohammed Shazil
4	DF	FIJ	Manasa Nawakula
5	MF	FIJ	Sitiveni Cavuilagi
6	DF	FIJ	Simione Nabenu
7	FW	FIJ	Ratu Dau
8	FW	SOL	Darold Kakasi
9	FW	FIJ	Abbu Zahid Shaheed
10	MF	FIJ	Ratu Nakalevu
11	DF	FIJ	Ilimotama Jese
12	DF	FIJ	Kishan Sami
13	MF	FIJ	Malakai Rakula
14	DF	FIJ	Sakaraia Naisua

No.	Pos.	Nation	Player
15	FW	FIJ	Saula Waqa
16	MF	FIJ	Malakai Tiwa
17	MF	FIJ	Narendra Rao
18	FW	FIJ	Sanaila Waqanicakau
19	MF	FIJ	Kalaveti Sivoi
20	FW	FIJ	Amena Bolaitamana
21	GK	FIJ	Atunaisa Naucukidi
22	GK	FIJ	Josaia Ratu
23	MF	FIJ	Kini Madigi
24	DF	FIJ	Suliano Tawanakoro
25	DF	FIJ	Josaia Tuwai
26	MF	FIJ	William Valentine
27	MF	FIJ	Shivneel Singh

=== Youth squad ===
Note: Flags indicate national team as defined under FIFA eligibility rules; some limited exceptions apply. Players may hold more than one non-FIFA nationality.

No.	Pos.	Nation	Player
—	GK	FIJ	Isikeli Savenaia
—	DF	FIJ	Jone Sukulu
—	DF	FIJ	Mohammed Jamil
—	DF	FIJ	Rahul Naresh
—	DF	FIJ	Peceli Sukabula

No.	Pos.	Nation	Player
—	DF	FIJ	Samuel Navoce
—	MF	FIJ	Shaneel Narayan
—	MF	FIJ	Mohammed Nabeel
—	FW	FIJ	Jovilisi Muloca

== Former players ==
- (Fiji) Laniana Qereqeretabua

== Honours ==
- Fiji Premier League: 22

1977, 1979, 1986, 1987, 1992, 1994, 1995, 1999, 2001, 2002, 2003, 2004, 2005, 2006, 2008, 2010, 2011, 2012, 2013, 2016, 2019, 2026.

- Inter-District Championship : 25

1961, 1963, 1966, 1967, 1968, 1970, 1975, 1976, 1977, 1978, 1979, 1980, 1982, 1986, 1991, 1996, 1997, 2000, 2003, 2004, 2006, 2007, 2013, 2015, 2023, 2026

- Battle of the Giants: 18

1979, 1981, 1984, 1990, 1992, 1993, 1998, 1999, 2000, 2001, 2006, 2007, 2008, 2009, 2012, 2013, 2018, 2026.

- Fiji Football Association Cup Tournament: 9

1991, 1997 (shared by Labasa), 1998, 2004, 2005, 2006, 2007, 2010, 2026

- Champion versus Champion Series: 20

1993, 1994, 1995, 1996, 1997, 1998, 1999, 2000, 2001, 2002, 2003, 2004, 2005, 2006, 2008, 2011, 2012, 2013, 2014, 2018.

Note: No football tournaments were held in 1987 besides the Fijian Premier league.

== Continental record ==
OFC Men's Champions League results
Season	Round	Club	Home	Away	Aggregate

- OFC Champions League: 8 appearances

Best: Finalist in 2007
1987: Third place
2005: Preliminary round
2007: Finalist
2008: 3rd in Group B
2009: 3rd in Group B
2012: 3rd in Group A
2013: Semi Final
2014: Semi Final

== See also ==
- Fiji Football Association

== Bibliography ==
- M. Prasad, Sixty Years of Soccer in Fiji 1938–1998: The Official History of the Fiji Football Association, Fiji Football Association, Suva, 1998.
