= 2022 MSG Prime Minister's Cup =

Tournament details
- Host country: Vanuatu
- City: Port Vila
- Dates: 17–30 September
- Teams: 6 (from 1 confederation)
- Venue: 1 (in 1 host city)

Final positions
- Champions: Papua New Guinea (1st title)
- Runners-up: Vanuatu "B"
- Third place: Fiji

Tournament statistics
- Matches played: 10
- Goals scored: 24 (2.4 per match)
- Top scorer: (Papua New Guinea) Nigel Dabinyaba (3 goals)

The 2022 MSG Prime Minister's Cup was held from 17–30 September 2022. Vanuatu hosted the competition with all matches being played at the Korman Stadium in Port Vila. The tournament was a resurrection of the Melanesia Cup which has not been held since the year 2000. It was a FIFA Tier-1 tournament.

== Format ==
The six competing teams are divided into two groups. A total of 10 matches will be played on five matchdays.

== Matches ==
=== Group A ===
Group A consists of Papua New Guinea, host Vanuatu, and Vanuatu's development side.

Pos	Team	Pld	W	D	L	GF	GA	GD	Pts	Qualification
1	Papua New Guinea	2	2	0	0	3	1	+2	6	Advance to Knockout stage
2	Vanuatu B	2	0	1	1	3	4	−1	1	Advance to Knockout stage
3	Vanuatu	2	0	1	1	2	3	−1	1	

17 September 2022

Vanuatu "B"	1–2	Papua New Guinea
Tasip (pen.)	Report	Joe 13'; Gunemba

Korman Stadium, Port Vila
21 September 2022

Vanuatu	2–2	Vanuatu "B"
Kalo 8'; Goddin 51'	Report	Dolsen 4'; Ravo 90+4'

Korman Stadium, Port Vila
24 September 2022

Vanuatu	0–1	Papua New Guinea
	Report	Kepo 77'

Korman Stadium, Port Vila

=== Group B ===
Fiji, New Caledonia, and the Solomon Islands have been drawn into Group B.

Pos	Team	Pld	W	D	L	GF	GA	GD	Pts	Qualification
1	Solomon Islands	2	1	1	0	3	2	+1	4	Advance to Knockout stage
2	Fiji	2	1	1	0	3	2	+1	4	Advance to Knockout stage
3	New Caledonia	2	0	0	2	0	2	−2	0	

17 September 2022

Fiji	1–0	New Caledonia
Matanisiga 90+1'	Report

Luganville Soccer Stadium, Luganville
21 September 2022

Solomon Islands	1–0	New Caledonia
Hou 47'	Report

Luganville Soccer Stadium, Luganville
24 September 2022

Fiji	2–2	Solomon Islands
Krishna 64'; Tekiate 66'	Report	Lea'i 31'; Lea'alafa 54'

Luganville Soccer Stadium, Luganville

== Knockout stage ==
=== Semi-finals ===
27 September

Papua New Guinea	1–0	Fiji
Dabinyaba 23' (pen.)	Report

Luganville Soccer Stadium, Luganville
27 September

Solomon Islands	1–1	Vanuatu "B"
Lea'i 37'	Report	Aru 70'
Penalties
	3–5

Luganville Soccer Stadium, Luganville

=== Third place match ===
30 September

Solomon Islands	0–1	Fiji
	Report	Wasasala 90'

Luganville Soccer Stadium, Luganville

=== Final ===
30 September

Papua New Guinea	3–3	Vanuatu "B"
Dabinyaba 38', 64'; Gunemba 116'	Report	Tasip 8'; Moses 28'; Ravo 92'
Penalties
	4–1

Luganville Soccer Stadium, Luganville

== Statistics ==
=== Goalscorers ===
There were 24 goals scored in 10 matches, for an average of 2.4 goals per match.

3 goals

- (Papua New Guinea) Nigel Dabinyaba

2 goals

- (Papua New Guinea) Raymond Gunemba
- (Solomon Islands) Raphael Lea'i
- (Vanuatu) (Dev.) Jordy Tasip
- (Vanuatu) (Dev.) Reginold Ravo

1 goal

- (Fiji) Roy Krishna
- (Fiji) Gabriele Matanisiga
- (Fiji) Remueru Tekiate
- (Fiji) Christopher Wasasala
- (Papua New Guinea) Daniel Joe
- (Papua New Guinea) Atti Kepo
- (Solomon Islands) Alvin Hou
- (Solomon Islands) Micah Lea'alafa
- (Vanuatu) Tenene Goddin
- (Vanuatu) Bong Kalo
- (Vanuatu) (Dev.) Claude Aru
- (Vanuatu) (Dev.) Siaban Dolsen
- (Vanuatu) (Dev.) Joe Moses
