= Christophe Gamel =

French football coach (born 1972)

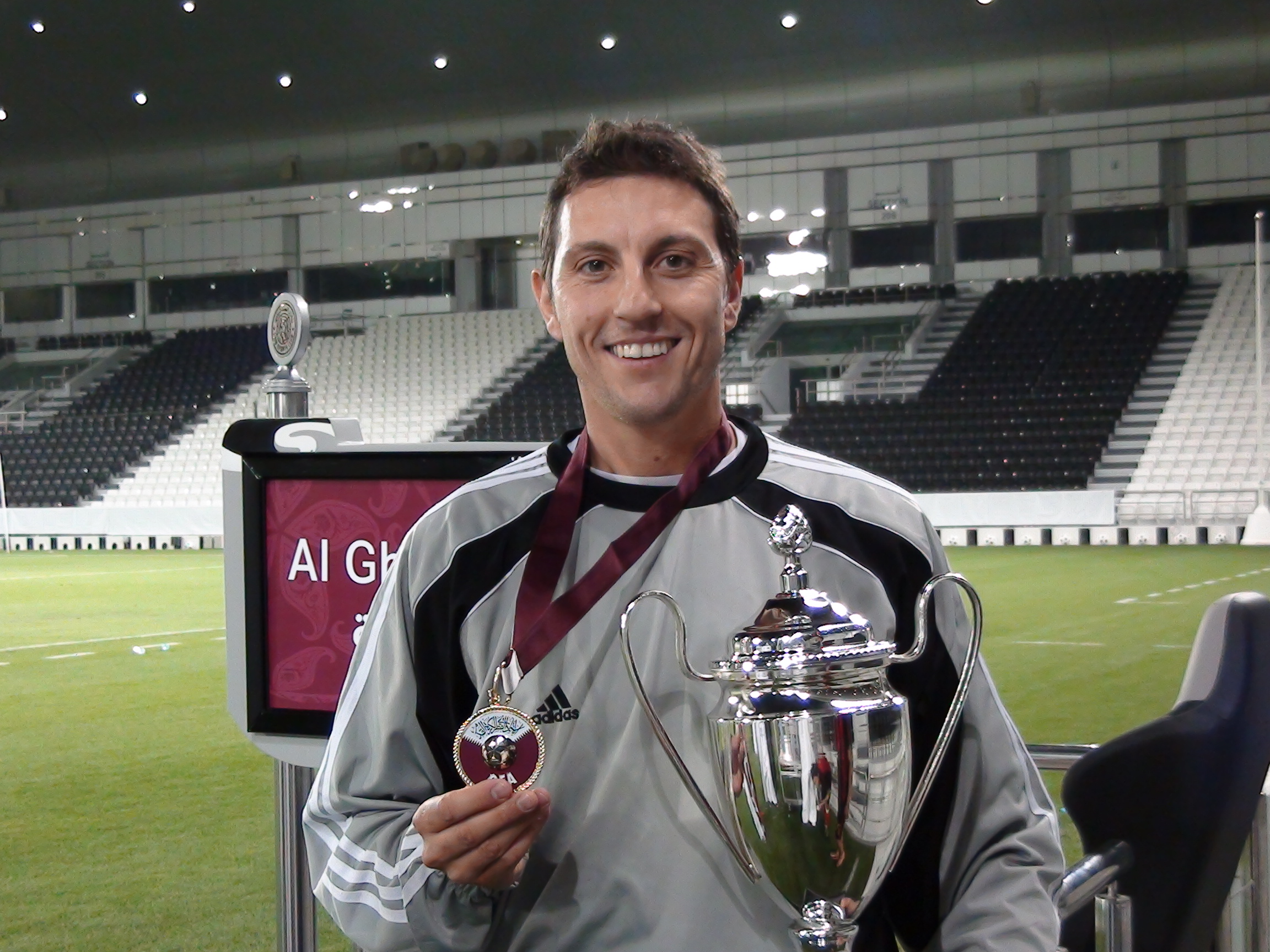

Personal information
- Date of birth: 11 August 1972 (age 54)
- Place of birth: Meaux, France

Team information
- Current team: Selangor (technical director)

Managerial career
- Years: Team
- 1990 – 1996: CS Meaux U9 - U12
- 1997 – 1998: Fréjus Saint-Raphael U15
- 1999 – 2000: ES Lorgues U16
- 2001 – 2002: VGA Saint-Maur (youth)
- 2002 – 2005: Cassino (youth)
- 2006 – 2007: Com Bagneux (women's coach)
- 2007 – 2009: Diósgyőri
- 2009 – 2010: Qatar U17
- 2009 – 2010: Qatar U19
- 2010 – 2012: Al Rayyan
- 2012 – 2016: Paris Saint-Germain Féminines
- 2016 – 2019: Fiji
- 2019 – 2020: Roeselare
- 2020 – 2021: Paradou
- 2021: Sri Pahang (assistant)
- 2021: Sri Pahang (youth)
- 2022: Sri Pahang
- 2023: Vietnam U23 (assistant)
- 2023: Vietnam (assistant)
- 2023 – 2025: Macarthur FC (assistant)
- 2025: Selangor II
- 2025 – 2026: Selangor (interim)
- 2026 –: Selangor (technical director)
Medal record
Men's football
Representing Fiji (as manager)
Pacific Games
Bronze medal – third place	2019 Samoa
Pacific Mini Games
Silver medal – second place	2017 Vanuatu

Christophe Gamel (born 11 August 1972) is a French football coach who is recently the interim manager for the Malaysia Super League club Selangor.

== Managerial career ==
Gamel played semi-professionally for various French and Italian clubs while coaching youth football teams. He has a pro licence from the Union of European Football Associations (UEFA). He has also worked with Al Rayyan SC in Qatar and Diósgyőri VTK in Hungary before taking on the job of the assistant coach of the Paris Saint-Germain women's team.

=== Fiji ===
On 31 December 2016, it was reported that Gamel would take over as the Fiji national team's new head coach, replacing the sacked Frank Farina. Gamel says “I have my own methodology of work which has brought success to my teams in the past and I hope I can achieve the same with Fiji. My task is to build for the future and we will need everyone to be involved. We respect our opponents and we know that they are strong. Solidarity, sacrifices, hard work and our pleasure to play will be our weapons. First we build a new style of play and culture in all the national teams, then we develop coaches’ formations, develop a database for national players, improve international visibility of Fiji football, and develop the women’s game in Fiji.”

In August 2019, Gamel announced his retirement from being the head coach of the Fiji national football team, citing personal reasons. He would finish his role on 30 August 2019.

=== Sri Pahang ===
Gamel was appointed as Sri Pahang assistant head coach for the 2021 season, assisting Thomas Dooley. However, after Dooley was replaced by Dollah Salleh, Gamel was appointed as manager for Sri Pahang's Presidential Cup Team (youth team).

On 4th of January 2022, Sri Pahang officially announced its naming of Gamel as head coach, replacing Dollah Salleh who became Sri Pahang's manager.

=== Vietnam ===
In 2023, Gamel was appointed as an assistant coach for the Vietnam U-23 and Vietnam national team.

=== Macarthur ===
On 1 July 2023, Gamel became an assistant coach under Mile Sterjovski at Macarthur competing in the A-League Men.

=== Selangor II ===
In August 2025, he returned to Malaysia again. Now Gamel has been appointed as the head coach Selangor II for the 2025–26 Malaysia A1 Semi-Pro League season.

=== Selangor ===
On 26 September 2025, Gamel was appointed as an interim manager for Selangor following the departure of Katsuhito Kinoshi as Selangor manager.

On 5 January 2026, Gamel left his role as Selangor interim manager and appointed as an technical director for Selangor

== Honours ==
=== Manager ===
Fiji

- Pacific Games: Bronze Medalist, 2019
- Pacific Mini Games: Silver Medalist, 2017

== Managerial statistics ==
As of 4 January 2026

Managerial record by team and tenure
Team	Nat.	From	To	Record					Ref.
Team	Nat.	From	To	G	W	D	L	Win %	Ref.
Fiji	(Fiji)	1 January 2017	15 August 2019	27	9	10	8	33.33	
Roeselare	(Belgium)	27 November 2019	30 June 2020	12	2	8	2	16.67	
Sri Pahang	(Malaysia)	3 January 2022	14 July 2022	13	3	3	7	23.08	
Selangor II	(Malaysia)	30 July 2025	25 September 2025	4	3	1	0	75.00	
Selangor (interim)	(Malaysia)	26 September 2025	4 January 2026	18	7	5	6	38.89	
Career Total				74	24	27	23	32.43	
