= Football at the 2017 Pacific Mini Games – Men's tournament =

2017 Pacific Mini Games
Tournament details
- Host country: Vanuatu
- Dates: 2–15 December
- Teams: 6 (from 1 confederation)
- Venues: 2 (in 1 host city)

Final positions
- Champions: Vanuatu (1st title)
- Runners-up: Fiji
- Third place: Solomon Islands
- Fourth place: Tuvalu

Tournament statistics
- Matches played: 15
- Goals scored: 73 (4.87 per match)
- Top scorer: (Fiji) Saula Waqa (7 goals)

Football was contested as part of the programme for the 2017 Pacific Mini Games which was hosted in Port Vila, Vanuatu from 4 to 15 December 2017. It was the third edition of the men's football tournament at the multi-sport event organised by the Pacific Games Council.

The football tournament, contested as a round-robin, began with the first round matches on 2 December 2017 and ended with the final round of matches on 15 December 2017. Vanuatu defeated the Solomon Islands 3–2 in the final and decisive match to win the gold medal. Fiji won the silver medal and the Solomon Islands won the bronze medal.

== Background ==
Football had been part of the Pacific Games programme following the debut of the men's competition at the inaugural 1963 South Pacific Games in Fiji. However, it had only twice before been included in the programme for the Pacific Mini Games – the inaugural 1981 South Pacific Mini Games in the Solomon Islands and the 1993 South Pacific Mini Games in Vanuatu.

Tahiti were two-time defending champions after defeating New Caledonia 1–0 after extra time in the gold medal match in 1981 and Fiji 3–0 in the gold medal match in 1993.

== Format ==
A total of six teams took part in the competition. They contested a single round robin group. The group winners were awarded the gold medal, the runners-up were awarded the silver medal and third place were awarded the bronze medal. The fixtures were announced on 25 November 2017.

=== Participants ===
- Fiji
- New Caledonia
- Solomon Islands
- Tonga
- Tuvalu
- Vanuatu

== Venues ==
All matches were played at two venues in Port Vila including the Port Vila Municipal Stadium and the Korman Stadium.

The host city is Port Vila.

Port Vila Municipal Stadium	Korman Stadium
Capacity: 5,000	Capacity: 10,000

== Group stage ==
After winning four of their five matches, Vanuatu claimed the gold medal. Fiji finished second and were awarded the silver medal. The Solomon Islands finished third and claimed the bronze medal.

=== Table ===
Team	Pld	W	D	L	GF	GA	GD	Pts	Qualification
Vanuatu	5	4	1	0	21	4	+17	13	Gold medal
Fiji	5	3	2	0	17	2	+15	11	Silver medal
Solomon Islands	5	3	1	1	17	3	+14	10	Bronze medal
Tuvalu	5	2	0	3	6	28	−22	6	
New Caledonia	5	1	0	4	7	11	−4	3	
Tonga	5	0	0	5	5	25	−20	0	

=== Matches ===
2 December 2017
9:00 UTC+11

Fiji	8–0	Tuvalu
Wasasala 2', 16', 65', 67'; Waqa 24', 48', 56'; Matarerega 41'

Port Vila Municipal Stadium
Attendance: 1,000
Referee: George Time (Solomon Islands)
2 December 2017
12:00 UTC+11

Tonga	0–8	Solomon Islands
		Donga 4'; Totori 15', 19'; Mara 71', 88'; Feni 77', 87'; Tanito 82'

Port Vila Municipal Stadium
Attendance: 1,000
Referee: Joel Hopkken (Vanuatu)
2 December 2017
15:00 UTC+11

New Caledonia	1–2	Vanuatu
Wélépane 51'		Saniel 33'; Soromon 90+2'

Port Vila Municipal Stadium
Attendance: 3,000
Referee: Salesh Chand (Fiji)

5 December 2017
19:00 UTC+11

Tuvalu	2–1	New Caledonia
Ionatana 15'; Petoa 69'		Wélépane 76'

Korman Stadium
Attendance: 3,000
Referee: Robinson Banga (Vanuatu)
6 December 2017
16:00 UTC+11

Solomon Islands	0–0	Fiji

Korman Stadium
Attendance: 4,000
Referee: Joel Hopkken (Vanuatu)
6 December 2017
19:00 UTC+11

Vanuatu	5–0	Tonga
Ruben 12'; Soromon 38', 67'; T. Kaltack 73', 90'

Korman Stadium
Attendance: 6,000
Referee: David Yareboinen (Papua New Guinea)

9 December 2017
9:00 UTC+11

Tonga	2–4	New Caledonia
Feao 35'; Uele 66'		Gope-Iwate 1', 90'; Luepak 47'; Waitreu 57'

Port Vila Municipal Stadium
Attendance: 2,000
Referee: George Time (Solomon Islands)
9 December 2017
12:00 UTC+11

Vanuatu	1–1	Fiji
Soromon 72'		Wasasala 30'

Port Vila Municipal Stadium
Attendance: 7,000
Referee: David Yareboinen (Papua New Guinea)
9 December 2017
15:00 UTC+11

Solomon Islands	6–0	Tuvalu
Fa'arodo 5'; Mara 14', 81'; Bule 44'; Feni 65'; Totori 90'

Port Vila Municipal Stadium
Attendance: 1,500
Referee: Robinson Banga (Vanuatu)

12 December 2017
12:00 UTC+11

Fiji	4–0	Tonga
Waqa 7', 84'; Qasevakatini 14' (pen.); Radrigai 17'

Port Vila Municipal Stadium
Attendance: 1,000
Referee: David Yareboinen (Papua New Guinea)
12 December 2017
15:00 UTC+11

Tuvalu	0–10	Vanuatu
		Tangis 8', 31', 57', 90+1'; Molivakarua 60'; Soromon 68', 80'; T. Kaltack 76', 78', 90'

Port Vila Municipal Stadium
Attendance: 4,000
Referee: Nelson Sogo (Solomon Islands)
12 December 2017
19:00 UTC+11

New Caledonia	0–1	Solomon Islands
		Kaua 21'

Korman Stadium
Attendance: 2,500
Referee: Joel Hopkken (Vanuatu)

15 December 2017
9:00 UTC+11

Tuvalu	4–3	Tonga
Uaelesi 46'; Fahina 49' (o.g.); Petoa 90'; Lotonu 90'		Polovili 19'; Tokotaha 29', 49'

Port Vila Municipal Stadium
Attendance: 1,000
Referee: Nelson Sogo (Solomon Islands)
15 December 2017
12:00 UTC+11

Fiji	4–1	New Caledonia
Waqa 44', 46'; Tuivuna 90'; Matarerega 90'		Wélépane 81'

Port Vila Municipal Stadium
Attendance: 1,500
Referee: Joel Hopkken (Vanuatu)
15 December 2017
15:00 UTC+11

Solomon Islands	2–3	Vanuatu
Totori 27'; Fa'arodo 45'		Tangis 25'; Molivakarua 41'; Kalo 67'

Port Vila Municipal Stadium
Attendance: 6,000
Referee: David Yareboinen (Papua New Guinea)
