= Football at the 2019 Pacific Games – Men's tournament =

2019 Pacific Games men's football tournament
Tournament details
- Host country: Samoa
- City: Apia
- Dates: 8–20 July
- Teams: 11 (from 1 confederation)
- Venues: 2 (in 1 host city)

Final positions
- Champions: New Zealand U-23 (1st title)
- Runners-up: New Caledonia
- Third place: Fiji
- Fourth place: Papua New Guinea

Tournament statistics
- Matches played: 27
- Goals scored: 169 (6.26 per match)
- Attendance: 14,740 (546 per match)
- Top scorer(s): (New Caledonia) Jean-Philippe Saïko (Solomon Islands) Gagame Feni (Vanuatu) Tony Kaltak (9 goals each)

Football was contested as part of the programme for the 2019 Pacific Games which was hosted in Apia, Samoa from 7 to 20 July 2019. It was the 15th edition of the men's football tournament at the multi-sport event organised by the Pacific Games Council.

After the previous edition in 2015 was age-restricted to double as a qualifier for the 2016 Olympics, the tournament returned to its usual, unrestricted format. New Zealand, however, still fielded an under-23 side.

The football tournament began with the first matches of the group stage on 8 July 2019 and ended with the gold medal match on 20 July 2019. New Caledonia and New Zealand U-23 contested the final. New Zealand defeated New Caledonia 2–1 to win the gold medal for the first time. In the bronze medal match, Fiji defeated Papua New Guinea 4–2 on penalties.

== Background ==
Football had been part of the Pacific Games programme following the debut of the men's competition at the inaugural 1963 South Pacific Games in Fiji. However, football was not included in the 1999 South Pacific Games programme due to player registration differences between the South Pacific Games system and new Oceania Football Confederation (OFC) and Fédération Internationale de Football Association (FIFA) regulations.

New Caledonia held the record for gold medals having won the football tournament seven times. They were also three-time defending champions after defeating Fiji 1–0 in the gold medal match at the 2007 South Pacific Games in Samoa, the Solomon Islands 2–0 as hosts in the gold medal match at the 2011 Pacific Games and Tahiti 2–0 in the gold medal match at the age-restricted 2015 Pacific Games in Papua New Guinea.

== Format ==
A total of 11 teams took part in the competition. They were drawn into two single round robin groups, one of five teams and one of six teams. The group winners would contest the gold medal match and the group runners-up would contest the bronze medal match.

=== Participants ===
- American Samoa
- Fiji
- New Caledonia
- New Zealand U-23
- Papua New Guinea
- Samoa
- Solomon Islands
- Tahiti
- Tonga
- Tuvalu
- Vanuatu

=== Venue ===
| Apia | Football at the 2019 Pacific Games – Men's tournament is located in Samoa |
| J.S. Blatter Stadium | Football at the 2019 Pacific Games – Men's tournament is located in Samoa |
| 13°50′12″S 171°45′7″W | Football at the 2019 Pacific Games – Men's tournament is located in Samoa |
| Capacity: 3,500 | Football at the 2019 Pacific Games – Men's tournament is located in Samoa |

== Officials ==
These are the referees that were appointed for the games, six of which are from AFF.

Referees

- (Fiji) Salesh Chand
- (Indonesia) Thoriq Alkatiri
- (Malaysia) Nazmi Nasaruddin
- (Myanmar) Thein Thein Aye
- (New Zealand) Nadia Browning
- (New Zealand) Nick Waldron
- (Philippines) Clifford Daypuyat
- (Papua New Guinea) David Yareboinen
- (Papua New Guinea) Stephanie Minan
- (Solomon Islands) George Time
- (Solomon Islands) Natalia Lumukana
- (French Polynesia) Pari Oito
- (French Polynesia) Rani Perry
- (Tonga) Tapaita Lelenga
- (Thailand) Mongkolchai Pechsri
- (Thailand) Pansa Chaisanit
- (Vanuatu) Joel Hopken

Assistant Referees

- (Fiji) Avinesh Narayan
- (New Caledonia) Bertrand Brial
- (Papua New Guinea) Noah Kusunan
- (Samoa) Gerard Ionatana
- (Samoa) Malaetala Salanoa
- (Samoa) Maria Salamasina
- (Samoa) Natalia Lumukana
- (Solomon Islands) Bernard Mutukera
- (Solomon Islands) Douglas Mete
- (Solomon Islands) Jeffrey Solodia
- (Solomon Islands) Johnny Niabo
- (Solomon Islands) Stephen Seniga
- (Tonga) Folio Moeaki
- (Tonga) Lata Kumatale
- (Tonga) Sione Teu
- (Tonga) Tevita Makasini
- (Vanuatu) Hilton Sese
- (Vanuatu) Jeremy Garae

== Group stage ==
=== Group A ===
New Zealand U-23 advanced to the gold medal match and Papua New Guinea advanced to the bronze medal match.

==== Table ====
| Pos | Team | Pld | W | D | L | GF | GA | GD | Pts | Qualification |
|---|---|---|---|---|---|---|---|---|---|---|
| 1 | New Zealand U-23 | 4 | 3 | 1 | 0 | 20 | 1 | +19 | 10 | Gold medal match |
| 2 | Papua New Guinea | 4 | 3 | 0 | 1 | 16 | 2 | +14 | 9 | Bronze medal match |
| 3 | Vanuatu | 4 | 2 | 1 | 1 | 25 | 2 | +23 | 7 | |
| 4 | Samoa | 4 | 1 | 0 | 3 | 3 | 22 | −19 | 3 | |
| 5 | Tonga | 4 | 0 | 0 | 4 | 0 | 37 | −37 | 0 | |

==== Matches ====
8 July 2019
16:00

| Tonga | 0–13 | New Zealand U-23 |
|---|---|---|
| | | de Jong 4'; McIsaac 14', 41', 81'; Rogerson 28', 30', 37', 49', 54'; Heath 45+2'; Porter 78', 83', 90' |

J.S. Blatter Soccer Stadium #1, Apia
Attendance: 300
Referee: Mongkolchai Pechsri (Thailand)
8 July 2019
19:00

| Samoa | 0–6 | Papua New Guinea |
|---|---|---|
| | | K. Kepo 1', 52', 75'; Dabinyaba 83'; Gunemba 87'; A. Kepo 90' |

J.S. Blatter Soccer Stadium #1, Apia
Attendance: 1,000
Referee: Clifford Daypuyat (Philippines)

10 July 2019
16:00

| New Zealand U-23 | 5–1 | Samoa |
|---|---|---|
| Rogerson 15', 37'; Akers 44'; Tipelu 60'; Clark 77' | | Laloata 88' |

J.S. Blatter Soccer Stadium #1, Apia
Attendance: 1,150
Referee: Rani Perry (Tahiti)
10 July 2019
19:00

| Papua New Guinea | 2–0 | Vanuatu |
|---|---|---|
| Gunemba 11'; Simon 41' |

J.S. Blatter Soccer Stadium #1, Apia
Attendance: 1,000
Referee: Thoriq Alkatiri (Indonesia)

12 July 2019
16:00

| Vanuatu | 0–0 | New Zealand U-23 |

J.S. Blatter Soccer Stadium #1, Apia
Attendance: 900
Referee: Mongkolchai Pechsri (Thailand)
12 July 2019
19:00

| Samoa | 2–0 | Tonga |
|---|---|---|
| Laloata 60', 75' |

J.S. Blatter Soccer Stadium #1, Apia
Attendance: 1,200
Referee: Joel Hopken (Vanuatu)

15 July 2019
9:00

| Tonga | 0–14 | Vanuatu |
|---|---|---|
| | | Molivakarua 5'; Kalo 7'; Natou 9'; T. Kaltak 22', 64', 73', 82', 88'; Cooper 35'; Coulon 45'; Nicholls 45+1', 80', 87', 90+2' |

J.S. Blatter Soccer Stadium #2, Apia
Attendance: 100
Referee: Clifford Daypuyat (Philippines)
15 July 2019
10:00

| New Zealand U-23 | 2–0 | Papua New Guinea |
|---|---|---|
| Whyte 34' (pen.); Schnell 79' |

J.S. Blatter Soccer Stadium #1, Apia
Attendance: 300
Referee: Pari Oito (Tahiti)

18 July 2019
9:00

| Papua New Guinea | 8–0 | Tonga |
|---|---|---|
| Kamen 22', 54'; Dabinyaba 48'; Simon 58' (pen.), 62', 90+1'; Aisa 80'; Upaiga 83' |

J.S. Blatter Soccer Stadium #2, Apia
Attendance: 100
Referee: Clifford Daypuyat (Philippines)
18 July 2019
16:00

| Vanuatu | 11–0 | Samoa |
|---|---|---|
| Cooper 7', 14', 16', 23'; T. Kaltak 25', 32', 55', 78'; Bob 30'; Nicholls 38'; B. Kaltak 62' |

J.S. Blatter Soccer Stadium #1, Apia
Attendance: 500
Referee: Nazmi Nasaruddin (Malaysia)

=== Group B ===
New Caledonia advanced to the gold medal match and Fiji advanced to the bronze medal match.

==== Table ====
| Pos | Team | Pld | W | D | L | GF | GA | GD | Pts | Qualification |
|---|---|---|---|---|---|---|---|---|---|---|
| 1 | New Caledonia | 5 | 5 | 0 | 0 | 22 | 0 | +22 | 15 | Gold medal match |
| 2 | Fiji | 5 | 3 | 1 | 1 | 25 | 7 | +18 | 10 | Bronze medal match |
| 3 | Tahiti | 5 | 3 | 0 | 2 | 19 | 6 | +13 | 9 | |
| 4 | Solomon Islands | 5 | 2 | 1 | 2 | 30 | 9 | +21 | 7 | |
| 5 | American Samoa | 5 | 0 | 1 | 4 | 2 | 36 | −34 | 1 | |
| 6 | Tuvalu | 5 | 0 | 1 | 4 | 2 | 42 | −40 | 1 | |

==== Matches ====
8 July 2019
9:00

| American Samoa | 0–5 | New Caledonia |
|---|---|---|
| | | Hmaen 10'; Kaï 17', 38'; Saïko 59', 85' |

J.S. Blatter Soccer Stadium #2, Apia
Attendance: 100
Referee: Joel Hopken (Vanuatu)
8 July 2019
10:00

| Tuvalu | 0–13 | Solomon Islands |
|---|---|---|
| | | Feni 12', 17', 20', 33', 60'; Nawo 24'; Totori 29', 38'; Donga 40'; Kaua 43'; Tanito 44', 73'; Hou 71' |

J.S. Blatter Soccer Stadium #1, Apia
Attendance: 300
Referee: Pari Oito (Tahiti)
8 July 2019
13:00

| Tahiti | 1–2 | Fiji |
|---|---|---|
| Mu 88' | | Drudru 8'; Krishna 66' (pen.) |

J.S. Blatter Soccer Stadium #1, Apia
Attendance: 500
Referee: Nick Waldron (New Zealand)

10 July 2019
9:00

| Tuvalu | 0–7 | Tahiti |
|---|---|---|
| | | T. Tehau 8', 20' (pen.), 61'; Atani 27'; Tetauira 55'; Barbe 72'; Tehuritaua 82' |

J.S. Blatter Soccer Stadium #2, Apia
Attendance: 150
Referee: Clifford Daypuyat (Philippines)
10 July 2019
10:00

| American Samoa | 0–9 | Fiji |
|---|---|---|
| | | Vodowaqa 20', 24', 50', 82'; Rakula 36', 49'; Wasasala 46', 84'; Hughes 89' |

J.S. Blatter Soccer Stadium #1, Apia
Attendance: 250
Referee: Nazmi Nasaruddin (Malaysia)
10 July 2019
13:00

| Solomon Islands | 0–2 | New Caledonia |
|---|---|---|
| | | Saïko 50', 90' |

J.S. Blatter Soccer Stadium #1, Apia
Attendance: 1,000
Referee: David Yareboinen (Papua New Guinea)

12 July 2019
9:00

| American Samoa | 1–1 | Tuvalu |
|---|---|---|
| Pati 70' | | Petoa 31' |

J.S. Blatter Soccer Stadium #2, Apia
Attendance: 100
Referee: Pari Oito (Tahiti)
12 July 2019
10:00

| Solomon Islands | 0–3 | Tahiti |
|---|---|---|
| | | Tetauira 23'; T. Tehau 68', 87' |

J.S. Blatter Soccer Stadium #1, Apia
Attendance: 200
Referee: Nazmi Nasaruddin (Malaysia)
12 July 2019
13:00

| New Caledonia | 1–0 | Fiji |
|---|---|---|
| Saïko 43' (pen.) |

J.S. Blatter Soccer Stadium #1, Apia
Attendance: 800
Referee: Nick Waldron (New Zealand)

15 July 2019
13:00

| Fiji | 10–1 | Tuvalu |
|---|---|---|
| Tekiate 10'; Matarerega 15'; Rakula 44'; Wasasala 68', 87'; Vodowaqa 70', 83'; Sami 76'; Krishna 89', 90+2' | | Vailine 53' |

J.S. Blatter Soccer Stadium #1, Apia
Attendance: 250
Referee: Nadia Browning (New Zealand)
15 July 2019
16:00

| Solomon Islands | 13–0 | American Samoa |
|---|---|---|
| Feni 18', 34', 61'; Ledoux 27' (o.g.); Totori 42'; Abba 49', 54', 60', 84'; Ifunaoa 51', 62', 74'; Taroga 69' |

J.S. Blatter Soccer Stadium #1, Apia
Attendance: 400
Referee: David Yareboinen (Papua New Guinea)
15 July 2019
19:00

| Tahiti | 0–3 | New Caledonia |
|---|---|---|
| | | Hmaen 30'; Wajoka 86'; Zeoula 90+1' |

J.S. Blatter Soccer Stadium #1, Apia
Attendance: 1,000
Referee: Thoriq Alkatiri (Indonesia)

18 July 2019
10:00

| New Caledonia | 11–0 | Tuvalu |
|---|---|---|
| Saïko 2', 13', 53', 60'; Decoire 2', 32', 90+3'; Nokisi 29' (o.g.); Hmaen 66', 87'; Tein-Padom 74' |

J.S. Blatter Soccer Stadium #1, Apia
Attendance: 100
Referee: Rani Perry (Tahiti)
18 July 2019
13:00

| Tahiti | 8–1 | American Samoa |
|---|---|---|
| T. Tehau 4', 39', 76' (pen.); Tetauira 10', 15', 85'; Roo 26'; Mu 84' | | Faamoana 35' |

J.S. Blatter Soccer Stadium #1, Apia
Attendance: 140
Referee: Joel Hopken (Vanuatu)
18 July 2019
19:00

| Fiji | 4–4 | Solomon Islands |
|---|---|---|
| Joseph 4'; Drudru 8'; Krishna 19', 48' | | Ifunaoa 11'; Feni 45'; Totori 58' (pen.), 65' (pen.) |

J.S. Blatter Soccer Stadium #1, Apia
Attendance: 1,000
Referee: Nick Waldron (New Zealand)

== Bronze medal match ==
Fiji defeated Papua New Guinea on penalties to win the bronze medal.

20 July 2019
9:00

| Papua New Guinea | 1–1 | Fiji |
|---|---|---|
| K. Kepo 38' | | Krishna 58' |
Penalties
| Foster (penalty scored); Dabinyaba (penalty scored); A. Komolong (penalty missed); K. Kepo (penalty missed) | 2–4 | (penalty scored) Krishna; (penalty scored) Hughes; (penalty scored) Votoniu; (penalty scored) Rawaqa |

J.S. Blatter Soccer Stadium #2, Apia
Attendance: 700
Referee: Thoriq Alkatiri (Indonesia)

== Gold medal match ==
New Zealand U-23 defeated New Caledonia to win the gold medal.

20 July 2019
12:00

| New Zealand U-23 | 2–1 | New Caledonia |
|---|---|---|
| Schnell 86'; Jones 90+4' | | Sele 55' |

J.S. Blatter Soccer Stadium #2, Apia
Attendance: 1,200
Referee: David Yareboinen (Papua New Guinea)

== See also ==
- Football at the 2019 Pacific Games – Women's tournament
- Football at the 2019 Pacific Games
- Football at the Pacific Games
