= 2011 Fiji National Football League =

Fiji National Football League
- Season: 2011
- Champions: Ba F.C.

The 2011 Fiji National Football League was the 35th season of the Fiji National Football League organized by the Fiji Football Association since its establishment in 1977.

== Standings ==
Pos	Team	Pld	W	D	L	GF	GA	GD	Pts	Qualification or relegation
1	Ba	20	16	1	3	58	10	+48	49	2012–13 OFC Champions League
2	Labasa	20	13	3	4	32	18	+14	42	
3	Lautoka	20	13	1	6	47	24	+23	40	
4	Navua	20	11	5	4	30	15	+15	38	
5	Rewa	20	8	6	6	25	27	−2	30	
6	Suva	20	9	1	10	23	27	−4	28	
7	Savusavu	20	7	3	10	15	25	−10	24	
8	Nadi	20	6	5	9	18	31	−13	23	
9	Tavua	20	5	2	13	25	31	−6	17	
10	Nadroga	20	3	3	14	15	47	−32	12	Relegation
11	Fiji U-23	20	4	0	16	18	51	−33	12	Relegation

Updated to match(es) played on November 26, 2011. Source: NFL Standings
Rules for classification: 1) points; 2) goal difference; 3) number of goals scored.
