= Gabriele Matanisiga =

Fijian footballer

Personal information
- Date of birth: 14 June 1995 (age 31)
- Place of birth: Nabalebale, Fiji
- Height: 1.94 m (6 ft 4 in)
- Positions: Defender; forward

Team information
- Current team: Rewa
- Number: 4

Youth career
- Seaqaqa

Senior career*
Years	Team	Apps	(Gls)
2015–2017	Labasa		
2017–2021	Rewa	39	(10)
2021	Suva	0	(0)
2021–2024	Rewa	43	(6)
2024	Wellington Olympic	7	(0)
2025	Rewa	17	(5)
2026	Bula	11	(0)
2026–	Rewa	4	(1)

International career^{‡}
2015	Fiji U20	3	(0)
2022–	Fiji	18	(2)
Medal record
Men's football
Representing Fiji
MSG Prime Minister's Cup
Winner	2026 Fiji
- * Club domestic league appearances and goals as of 27 May 2026 ‡ National team caps and goals as of 27 May 2026

Gabriele Matanisiga (born 14 June 1995) is a Fijian professional footballer who plays as a defender for Fiji Premier League club Rewa and the Fiji national football team.

== Early and personal life ==
Matanisiga was born in the village of Nabalebale and was educated at Seaqaqa Primary School before he was picked up by Seaqaqa FC . His brother Iowane is also a footballer, with Matanisiga playing with him at Rewa. Matanisiga worked as a sugarcane cutter and dropped out of school early to help support his siblings' careers.

== Club career ==
=== Rewa (first spell) ===
Matanisiga began his senior career at Labasa, signed for Rewa from Labasa in 2017, playing against his former club that same season in the Fiji Football Association Cup Tournament semi-final, defeating them 6–5 on penalties. He scored 10 goals in 39 league games in his first spell for Rewa, also representing Rewa in the Inter-District Championship, including in 2020, where he scored an equalising goal against Lautoka.

=== Suva FC transfer breach ===
In 2021, Matanisiga was fined $5,000 and banned for 6 matches for breaching dual-registration transfer regulations after signing for Suva F.C., along with being ordered to pay $3,000 to Suva FC. Following his return to Rewa, they filed an appeal to the decision of Player Status Committee, the committee focused on resolving Player Transfer Disputes between District Associations and clubs, the committee found Suva FC at equal fault and imposed a fine of $2,500.00 on Suva FC to be paid to Fiji Football Association, whilst also reducing Matanisiga's initial fine by halve from $5,000 to $2,500.

=== Rewa (second spell) ===
Matanisiga won the 2022 Fiji Premier League with Rewa, playing every match as Rewa won the league on the final day. The following year, Rewa finished as runners-up, with Matanisiga contributing 3 goals in 17 league matches, including a brace from defence against Nadroga.

=== Wellington Olympic ===
Matanisiga signed for New Zealand National League team Wellington Olympic in 2024.

=== Rewa (third spell) ===
Matanisiga rejoined Rewa in 2025, helping the team to the 2025 Fiji Premier League title, as well as the 2025 Inter-District Championship, a tournament in which he won the Player of the Tournament.

=== Bula FC ===
Matanisiga signed with Bula FC, a newly created Fijian club for the inaugural season of the OFC Professional League. He became the first signing in the club's history.

=== Rewa (fourth spell) ===
Matanisiga rejoined for the third time back to Rewa in June 2026 after the 2026 OFC Professional League season ended.

== International career ==
Matanisiga represented Fiji U20 at the 2015 FIFA U-20 World Cup in New Zealand.

Matanisiga was involved in training with the senior team in the lead up to their 2018 FIFA World Cup qualification campaign. He made his senior debut in 2022, scoring a late winner in a 1–0 victory over New Caledonia in the 2022 MSG Prime Minister's Cup. He was part of the Fiji squad for the 2024 OFC Men's Nations Cup.

Matanisigia has represented both the Fiji national futsal team, and the Fiji national beach soccer team as well as association football.

== Honours ==
Fiji

- MSG Prime Minister's Cup : 2026
