= 2021 Fiji Premier League =

2021 Digicel Premier League
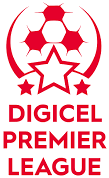
- Season: 2021
- Dates: 7 March - 19 December
- Champions: Lautoka (6th title)
- Relegated: Nadroga
- OFC Champions League: Suva; Lautoka
- Matches: 56
- Goals: 123 (2.2 per match)
- Top goalscorer: (Fiji) Sairusi Nalaubu (9 goals)
- Biggest home win: Ba F.C. 6-1 Labasa F.C. (17 December 2021)
- Biggest away win: Nadi F.C. 0-3 Ba F.C. Rewa F.C. 0-3 Lautoka (7 November 2021); Nadroga F.C. 0-3 Rewa F.C. (5 December 2021); Nadroga F.C. 0-3 Lautoka F.C. (12 December 2021)
- Highest scoring: Ba F.C. 6-1 Labasa F.C. (17 December 2021)

The 2021 Fiji Premier League was the 45th season of the Fiji Premier League (Digicel Premier League for sponsorship reasons), the top-tier football league in Fiji organized by the Fiji Football Association since its establishment in 1977. The season began on 7 March 2021. Suva are the defending champions.

On March 3, 2021, Digicel Fiji signed a 3-year deal to sponsor the league, effectively renaming the competition to the Digicel Premier League.

== Team changes ==
=== To Fiji Premier League ===
Promoted from 2020 Vodafone Senior League

- Nadroga

=== From Fiji Premier League ===
Relegated to 2021 Vodafone Senior League

- Nasinu

== Stadiums and locations ==
Locations of the 2021 Fiji Premier League teams

A total of 8 teams competed in the league.

Note: Table lists in alphabetical order.

| Team | Location | Stadium | Capacity |
|---|---|---|---|
| Ba | Ba | Govind Park (Note: No matches were played in Govind Park during the season.) | 13,500 |
| Labasa | Labasa | Subrail Park | 10,000 |
| Lautoka | Lautoka | Churchill Park | 10,000 |
| Nadi | Nadi | Prince Charles Park | 18,000 |
| Nadroga | Sigatoka | Lawaqa Park | 12,000 |
| Navua | Navua | Thomson Park | 1,000 |
| Rewa | Nausori | Foodcity Ratu Cakobau Park | 8,000 |
| Suva | Suva | HFC Bank Stadium | 15,000 |

== League table ==
| Pos | Team | Pld | W | D | L | GF | GA | GD | Pts | Qualification or relegation |
|---|---|---|---|---|---|---|---|---|---|---|
| 1 | Lautoka (C, Q) | 14 | 9 | 3 | 2 | 22 | 11 | +11 | 30 | Qualification to OFC Champions League Qualifying stage |
| 2 | Rewa (Q) | 14 | 7 | 4 | 3 | 20 | 11 | +9 | 25 | Qualification to OFC Champions League Qualifying stage |
| 3 | Ba | 14 | 6 | 4 | 4 | 22 | 11 | +11 | 22 | |
| 4 | Suva | 14 | 6 | 3 | 5 | 16 | 11 | +5 | 21 | |
| 5 | Labasa | 14 | 4 | 7 | 3 | 9 | 12 | −3 | 19 | |
| 6 | Nadi | 14 | 3 | 6 | 5 | 14 | 24 | −10 | 15 | |
| 7 | Navua | 14 | 2 | 3 | 9 | 10 | 21 | −11 | 9 | |
| 8 | Nadroga (R) | 14 | 1 | 6 | 7 | 10 | 22 | −12 | 9 | Relegation to Fiji Senior League |

Source: Fiji FA
(C) Champions; (Q) Qualified for the phase indicated; (R) Relegated

== Results ==
| Home \ Away | BA | LAB | LAU | NAD | NAA | NAV | REW | SUV |
|---|---|---|---|---|---|---|---|---|
| Ba | — | 6–1 | 1–2 | 4–1 | 1–1 | 3–0 | 0–2 | 0–0 |
| Labasa | 0–0 | — | 1–1 | 0–1 | 1–0 | 2–1 | 0–0 | 1–0 |
| Lautoka | 1–1 | 2–0 | — | 3–1 | 1–0 | 1–0 | 1–1 | 1–0 |
| Nadi | 0–3 | 0–0 | 2–0 | — | 1–1 | 1–1 | 1–1 | 1–0 |
| Nadroga | 0–1 | 0–0 | 0–3 | 2–2 | — | 1–2 | 0–3 | 1–1 |
| Navua | 1–0 | 0–0 | 1–2 | 2–2 | 1–2 | — | 1–2 | 0–2 |
| Rewa | 1–0 | 1–1 | 0–3 | 3–1 | 3–0 | 2–0 | — | 1–2 |
| Suva | 1–2 | 0–1 | 2–1 | 4–0 | 2–2 | 1–0 | 1–0 | — |

Updated to match(es) played on 19 December 2021. Source: Fiji FA
Legend: Blue = home team win; Yellow = draw; Red = away team win.

== Top scorers ==
As of match 19 December 2021

| Rank | Player | Club | Goals |
|---|---|---|---|
| 1 | (Fiji) Sairusi Nalaubu | Lautoka | 9 |
| 2 | (Fiji) Sakaraia Naisua | Nadi | 6 |
| 3 | (Fiji) Anish Khem | Rewa | 5 |
| 4 | (Fiji) Osea Vakatalesau | Nadroga | 4 |
| 5 | (Fiji) Rusiate Matarerega | Nadroga | 3 |
| 5 | (Fiji) Samuela Drudru | Ba | 3 |
| 5 | (Fiji) Samuela Nabenia | Rewa | 3 |
| 5 | (Fiji) Saula Waqa | Ba | 3 |
| 5 | (Fiji) Setareki Hughes | Rewa | 3 |
| 5 | (Fiji) Shameel Rao | Ba | 3 |
| 5 | (Fiji) Waisake Navunigasau | Suva | 3 |
