= 2013 Fiji National Football League =

- Season: 2013
- Champions: Ba F.C. (19th title)
- Relegated: Tavua FC; Savusavu FC

The 2013 Fiji National Football League was the 37th season of the Fiji National Football League organized by the Fiji Football Association since its establishment in 1977.

== Standings ==
Pos	Team	Pld	W	D	L	GF	GA	GD	Pts	Qualification or relegation
1	Ba FC (C)	18	13	2	3	58	14	+44	41	2013–14 OFC Champions League
2	Nadi FC	18	12	1	5	32	16	+16	37	2013–14 OFC Champions League
3	Suva FC	18	11	2	5	59	19	+40	35	
4	Lautoka FC	18	8	7	3	38	23	+15	31	
5	Labasa FC	18	9	3	6	29	20	+9	30	
6	Rewa FC	18	9	3	6	29	21	+8	30	
7	Navua FC	18	8	3	7	32	22	+10	27	
8	Nadroga FC	18	5	3	10	21	27	−6	18	
9	Tavua FC (R)	18	1	1	16	15	85	−70	4	Relegation to the 2014 Fiji Senior League
10	Savusavu FC (R)	18	0	3	15	11	77	−66	3	Relegation to the 2014 Fiji Senior League

Updated to match(es) played on 4 July 2013. Source: Soccerway
Rules for classification: 1) points; 2) goal difference; 3) number of goals scored.
(C) Champions; (R) Relegated
