= 2024 OFC U-19 Men's Championship squads =

The 2024 OFC U-19 Men's Championship is an international football tournament being held in Samoa from 5 to 18 July 2024 for under 19 players. The eight national teams involved in the tournament are required to register a squad of up to 23 players, including three goalkeepers. Only players in these squads are eligible to take part in the tournament. The two finalists of the tournament qualify for the 2025 FIFA U-20 World Cup.

The position listed for each player is per the official squad list published by the OFC. The age listed for each player is on 5 July 2024, the first day of the tournament. The nationality for each club reflects the national association (not the league) to which the club is affiliated. A flag is included for coaches that are of a different nationality than their own national team.

== Group A ==
=== Fiji ===
- Coach: Marika Rodu

No.	Pos.	Player	Date of birth (age)	Club
1	GK	Kartik Sharma	6 October 2006 (aged 17)	(Fiji Football Association) Labasa
2	DF	Sterling Vasconcellos	19 April 2005 (aged 19)	(Fiji Football Association) Lautoka
3	DF	William Khan	31 May 2006 (aged 18)	(Fiji Football Association) Nadroga
4	MF	Nilkash Prasad	31 March 2005 (aged 19)	(Fiji Football Association) Nadi
5	MF	Isimeli Gavidi	29 January 2006 (aged 18)	(Fiji Football Association) Lautoka
6	MF	Richard Swami	17 June 2006 (aged 18)	(New Zealand Football) Auckland City
7	DF	Shivam Shandil	7 January 2005 (aged 19)	(Fiji Football Association) Suva
8	DF	Eparama Moraica	3 May 2005 (aged 19)	(Fiji Football Association) Labasa
9	FW	Akash Prasad	18 November 2007 (aged 16)	(New Zealand Football) Manurewa
10	MF	Aidan Singh	8 June 2005 (aged 19)	(New Zealand Football) Manurewa
11	FW	Ibraheem Afazal	12 April 2007 (aged 17)	(Football Australia) APIA
12	MF	Dan Steiner		(Fiji Football Association) Labasa
13	MF	Sameer Begg		(Football Australia) Bankstown United
14	DF	Shaheel Valentine	1 January 2005 (aged 19)	(Fiji Football Association) Nadi
15	DF	Mohammed Ayman	9 June 2005 (aged 19)	(Fiji Football Association) Nadi
16	MF	Raul Chandra	19 September 2005 (aged 18)	(Fiji Football Association) Nasinu
17	MF	Vishant Reddy	16 March 2005 (aged 19)	(Fiji Football Association) Nadi
18	FW	Penisoni Tirau		(Fiji Football Association) Ba
19	MF	Delon Shankar	31 March 2007 (aged 17)	(Fiji Football Association) Rewa
20	GK	Ilisoni Koro	18 November 2006 (aged 17)	(Fiji Football Association) Ba
21	DF	Vinayak Rao	6 April 2006 (aged 18)	(Fiji Football Association) Nadi
22	GK	Ryan Mishra		(Fiji Football Association) Tailevu North
23	DF	Waisea Nagonelevu	30 June 2006 (aged 18)	(Fiji Football Association) Ba

=== Solomon Islands ===
- Coach: Batram Suri

No.	Pos.	Player	Date of birth (age)	Club
1	GK	Gideon Abidan		
2	DF	Billy Afi	12 June 2005 (aged 19)	(Solomon Islands Football Federation) Henderson Eels
3	DF	Gordon Iro		
4	MF	Lamupio Ninamo		
5	MF	John Dioko		
6	DF	Christopher Samo		
7	MF	Zopoa Besa		
8	MF	Jayroll Patty		
9	FW	Stanley Sope		
10	MF	Paul Francis		
11	FW	James Laena		
12	GK	Nelson Vaji		
13	MF	Junior Albert		
14	MF	Martin Koto		
15	FW	Jimson Abana		
16	DF	Bismark Sisika		
17	DF	Floyd Wasima'asu		
18	DF	William Arofa		
19	MF	Ryan Sogo Tuhaika		
20	GK	George Rioa		
21	FW	Abraham Morgan		
22	MF	Joash Houkulu		
23	DF	Teddy Osifela		

=== Tahiti ===
- Coach: Bruno Tehaamoana

No.	Pos.	Player	Date of birth (age)	Club
1	GK	Keahinui Heinis	3 August 2005 (aged 18)	(French Football Federation) Montpellier
2	MF	Herehau Marmouyet		
3	DF	Hitimoana Teuira	20 June 2006 (aged 18)	(Tahitian Football Federation) Vénus
4	DF	Bradley Ruiz	24 December 2007 (aged 16)	(French Football Federation) Saint-Étienne
5	DF	Eden Cadousteau	18 April 2006 (aged 18)	(French Football Federation) Tamarii
6	DF	Vaitea Seguy	7 January 2006 (aged 18)	(French Football Federation) Colomiers
7	DF	Keanan Faure	23 June 2006 (aged 18)	
8	MF	Noarii Cuneo	3 March 2006 (aged 18)	(Tahitian Football Federation) Vénus
9	FW	Tuarii Rota	30 March 2007 (aged 17)	(Tahitian Football Federation) Tefana
10	MF	Cedovan Taniel	21 November 2006 (aged 17)	(Tahitian Football Federation) Tefana
11	FW	Franck Papaura	6 April 2005 (aged 19)	(Tahitian Football Federation) Pueu
12	FW	Titouan Guillemant	4 February 2006 (aged 18)	(Tahitian Football Federation) Tefana
13	MF	Kamalani Bennett	25 December 2005 (aged 18)	(Tahitian Football Federation) Tefana
14	DF	Kanoa Barsinas	23 January 2006 (aged 18)	(Tahitian Football Federation) Tefana
15	MF	Hiria Morgant		(Tahitian Football Federation) Tefana
16	GK	Niuhau Firiapu	21 December 2007 (aged 16)	(Tahitian Football Federation) Tefana
17	DF	Tahiarii Teriitemataua	9 January 2006 (aged 18)	(Tahitian Football Federation) Central Sport
18	MF	Manoa Flores		(Tahitian Football Federation) Vénus
19	MF	Iliwai Resopawiro	15 December 2005 (aged 18)	(Tahitian Football Federation) Tefana
20	MF	Dylan Hutia	20 March 2006 (aged 18)	(Tahitian Football Federation) Tefana
21	FW	Mihirau Germain	20 March 2006 (aged 18)	(Tahitian Football Federation) Mira
22	GK	Argan Clodic-Boucher	8 May 2006 (aged 18)	(French Football Federation) Paris 13 Atletico

=== Vanuatu ===
- Coach: (Brazil) Emerson Alcântara

No.	Pos.	Player	Date of birth (age)	Club
1	GK	Joseph Nakou	9 September 2006 (aged 17)	(Vanuatu Football Federation) Tafea
2	MF	Silvio Alfred		
3	DF	Alon Dara		
4	DF	Rico Welin		
5	DF	Manuel Loren		
6	DF	Jean Natou	26 June 2007 (aged 17)	(Vanuatu Football Federation) Teouma Academy
7	MF	Romain Luake	24 March 2006 (aged 18)	(Vanuatu Football Federation) Tafea
8	MF	Maliwan Thomas	26 January 2005 (aged 19)	(Vanuatu Football Federation) Tafea
9	FW	Jacky Numake		(Vanuatu Football Federation) Tafea
10	MF	Sergio Waoute	3 November 2006 (aged 17)	(Vanuatu Football Federation) Erakor Golden Star
11	MF	Ronn Tasarur		
12	GK	Jesse Thomas		
13	MF	Paul Takaro	6 April 2007 (aged 17)	(Vanuatu Football Federation) VFF Academy
14	MF	Johnathan Kakor	6 February 2006 (aged 18)	(Vanuatu Football Federation) VFF Academy
15	DF	Jeffe Willy	18 June 2006 (aged 18)	(Vanuatu Football Federation) VFF Academy
16	MF	Joseph Anganaboe	22 May 2007 (aged 17)	(Vanuatu Football Federation) VFF Academy
17	FW	Jimmy Moso	29 November 2007 (aged 16)	(Vanuatu Football Federation) Teouma Academy
18	FW	Damien Tari	21 August 2007 (aged 16)	(Vanuatu Football Federation) Teouma Academy
19	FW	Glen Maki		
20	MF	Yano Chilia		
21	DF	Timothy Arukesa	27 April 2007 (aged 17)	(Vanuatu Football Federation) VFF Academy
22	MF	Ludovic Tataki		
23	GK	Simon James		

== Group B ==
=== New Caledonia ===
- Coach: Pierre Wajoka

No.	Pos.	Player	Date of birth (age)	Club
1	GK	Gabin Rachel		
2	DF	Tamumue Ajapuhnya		
3	DF	Pierre Tahmumu		
4	MF	Kapone Xulue		
5	DF	Wadria Hanye	16 December 2006 (aged 17)	(New Caledonian Football Federation) Lössi
6	MF	Joseph Hnaissilin	19 March 2006 (aged 18)	(New Caledonian Football Federation) Lössi
7	FW	Patrick Ouka		(New Caledonian Football Federation) Gaïca
8	MF	Anthony Levy	23 October 2006 (aged 17)	
9	DF	Louis Brunet	28 April 2005 (aged 19)	(New Caledonian Football Federation) Magenta
10	MF	Paul Qaeze	18 May 2006 (aged 18)	(New Caledonian Football Federation) Gaïca
11	MF	Kenay Weiri		(New Caledonian Football Federation) Magenta
12	DF	Jythrim Upa	2 October 2006 (aged 17)	(New Caledonian Football Federation) Lössi
13	MF	Yann Wahaga		
14	MF	Antoine Simane		
15	MF	Félix Caroline		
16	GK	Ryan Saulia		
17	FW	Kandjo Teanyouen		(New Caledonian Football Federation) Bélep Mont-Dore
18	FW	Landry Thupako	9 March 2007 (aged 17)	(New Caledonian Football Federation) Lössi
19	MF	Yazid Wajoka	14 March 2006 (aged 18)	(New Caledonian Football Federation) Magenta
20	MF	Damien Ujicas		(New Caledonian Football Federation) Magenta
21	GK	Raphaël Genton	6 August 2007 (aged 16)	
22	MF	Lomani Nahiet		
23	DF	Timotei Zeter	12 December 2006 (aged 17)	(New Caledonian Football Federation) Hienghène Sport

=== New Zealand ===
New Zealand Football announced their final 22 man squad on 14 June 2024.

- Coach: (England) Chris Greenacre

No.	Pos.	Player	Date of birth (age)	Club
1	GK	Alby Kelly-Heald	18 March 2005 (aged 19)	(New Zealand Football) Wellington Phoenix Reserves
2	DF	Tze-Xuan Loke	26 March 2005 (aged 19)	(New Zealand Football) Wellington Phoenix Reserves
3	DF	Rico Pradhan	26 June 2006 (aged 18)	(New Zealand Football) Christchurch United
4	DF	Luka Coveny	11 March 2006 (aged 18)	(Football Australia) Western United
5	FW	Adama Coulibaly	10 January 2005 (aged 19)	(New Zealand Football) Western Springs
6	FW	Fergus Gillion	19 January 2005 (aged 19)	(New Zealand Football) Wellington Phoenix Reserves
7	MF	Ryan Watson	14 June 2005 (aged 19)	(New Zealand Football) Wellington Phoenix Reserves
8	MF	Bruce Izumi	20 November 2005 (aged 18)	(New Zealand Football) Western Suburbs
9	FW	Keegan Kelly	5 June 2005 (aged 19)	(United States Soccer Federation) Flatirons Rush
10	MF	Lachlan Candy	22 August 2005 (aged 18)	(New Zealand Football) Waterside Karori
11	DF	Codey Phoenix	3 February 2005 (aged 19)	(New Zealand Football) Auckland United
12	DF	Seth Karunaratne	11 February 2005 (aged 19)	(New Zealand Football) Wellington Phoenix Reserves
13	GK	Eamonn McCarron	14 September 2007 (aged 16)	(New Zealand Football) Wellington Phoenix Reserves
14	MF	James Bulkeley	14 May 2005 (aged 19)	(United Arab Emirates Football Association) Fleetwood United
15	FW	Daniel Makowem	21 January 2005 (aged 19)	(New Zealand Football) Wellington Phoenix Reserves
16	FW	Stipe Ukich	3 January 2007 (aged 17)	(New Zealand Football) Auckland City
17	FW	Nathan Walker	30 January 2006 (aged 18)	(New Zealand Football) Wellington Phoenix Reserves
18	MF	Finn McKenlay	4 September 2005 (aged 18)	(New Zealand Football) Eastern Suburbs
20	GK	Joe Wallis	7 June 2005 (aged 19)	(New Zealand Football) Auckland City
21	FW	Gabriel Sloane-Rodrigues	3 July 2007 (aged 17)	(New Zealand Football) Wellington Phoenix
22	DF	Lewis Partridge	7 January 2005 (aged 19)	(New Zealand Football) Wellington Phoenix Reserves
23	FW	Luke Supyk	4 March 2006 (aged 18)	(New Zealand Football) Wellington Phoenix

=== Papua New Guinea ===
- Coach: Steven Mune

No.	Pos.	Player	Date of birth (age)	Club
1	GK	Daniel Sakora		
2	DF	Nelson Karaun		
3	DF	Charles David		
4	DF	Adrian Gomara		
5	DF	Hosea Sikoko		
6	MF	Sileon Hatagao		
7	MF	Benjamin Kila		
8	MF	Gorden Mark		
9	FW	Solomon Kamake		
10	MF	Percy Mataio		
11	MF	Nalau Moses		
12	MF	Landon Dobbin		
13	MF	Quitan U'pono		
14	MF	David Tia		
15	DF	Corben Hollenski		
16	FW	Raphael Rudolf		
17	MF	Kobi Yariyari		
18	MF	Daniel Faunt		
19	DF	Christopher Bito		
20	GK	Michael Ifu		
21	FW	Tonny Sangana		
22	GK	Sumanreni Kini		
23	FW	Johnson Belle		

=== Samoa ===
- Coach: (Italy) Valerio Raccuglia

No.	Pos.	Player	Date of birth (age)	Club
1	GK	Joel Bartley		
2	MF	Cayden Steffener	3 November 2007 (aged 16)	(New Zealand Football) Auckland City
3	DF	Aaron Enoka		
4	DF	Lonokaehu Tuitele		
5	MF	Philip Fatialofa	25 July 2005 (aged 18)	(New Zealand Football) Stop Out
6	FW	Ethan Stowers	26 October 2005 (aged 18)	(Football Federation Samoa) Faatoia United
7	FW	Harry Lilo		(New Zealand Football) Auckland City
8	MF	Isikeli Brown		
9	FW	Pharrell Trainor	20 June 2006 (aged 18)	(German Football Association) Schott Mainz
10	FW	Ethelbert Edward	3 September 2007 (aged 16)	(Football Federation Samoa) Lepea
11	FW	Juan Gobbi	17 November 2005 (aged 18)	
12	MF	Alex Malauulu	12 March 2006 (aged 18)	(Argentine Football Association) Atlético San Jorge
13	DF	Kingston Vaitusi	21 December 2007 (aged 16)	(Football Australia) Brisbane City
14	MF	Jason Goble-Lote	20 May 2008 (aged 16)	(Football Australia) Gold Coast Knights
15	DF	Noah Chamberlain		
16	MF	Kingston Hansell		
17	DF	Dominic Edward		(Football Federation Samoa) Lepea
18	MF	Peter Faamau		
20	DF	Aston Tolo-Kent		
21	MF	Reupena Fasi	14 January 2005 (aged 19)	(Football Federation Samoa) Goldstar Sogi
22	GK	Kirk Auvele	10 June 2006 (aged 18)	(Football Federation Samoa) Vaivase-Tai
23	GK	Filo Tyrell		
