= 2019 Inter-District Championship =

- Season: 2019
- Champions: Labasa (Premier Division)
- Matches: 15
- Goals: 44 (2.93 per match)
- Top goalscorer: Christopher Wasasala (Suva) - 4 Goals

The 2019 Inter-District Championship (IDC) is the 81st season of Inter-District Championship. It is the last championship of the 2019 Fijian football season. The 2019 IDC started on 8 October and is sponsored by Courts.

== Squads ==
Each team is allowed to register a 22-man squad

== Teams ==
The eight teams from 2019 Vodafone Premier League play 2019 IDC Premier Division

=== Participants ===
Team	Location
Ba	Ba
Labasa	Labasa
Lautoka	Lautoka
Nadi	Nadi
Nasinu	Nasinu
Rewa	Nausori
Suva	Suva
Tavua	Tavua

== Group stage ==
The 8 Vodafone Premier League teams were split in two groups with four teams each.

=== Group A ===
Pos	Team	Pld	W	D	L	GF	GA	GD	Pts
1	Labasa (Q)	3	2	1	0	4	2	+2	7
2	Ba (Q)	3	2	0	1	4	1	+3	6
3	Lautoka	3	1	1	1	8	6	+2	4
4	Tavua	3	0	0	3	4	11	−7	0

Updated to match(es) played on 10 October 2019. Source:
(Q) Qualified for the phase indicated

==== Results ====
Home \ Away	BAF	TAV	LAU	LAB
Ba	—	2–0	2–0	0–1
Navua		—	3–7	1–2
Lautoka			—	
Labasa			1–1	—

Updated to match(es) played on 10 October 2019. Source:
Legend: Blue = home team win; Yellow = draw; Red = away team win.
For upcoming matches, an "a" indicates there is an article about the rivalry between the two participants.

=== Group B ===
Pos	Team	Pld	W	D	L	GF	GA	GD	Pts
1	Suva (Q)	3	2	0	1	8	3	+5	6
2	Nadi (Q)	3	2	0	1	3	3	0	6
3	Rewa	3	1	0	2	4	4	0	3
4	Nasinu	3	1	0	2	2	7	−5	3

Updated to match(es) played on 10 October 2019. Source:
(Q) Qualified for the phase indicated

==== Results ====
Home \ Away	NAS	REW	NAD	SUV
Nasinu	—	2–1	0–1	0–5
Rewa		—	2–0	1–2
Nadi			—	2–1
Suva				—

Updated to match(es) played on 10 October 2019. Source:
Legend: Blue = home team win; Yellow = draw; Red = away team win.
For upcoming matches, an "a" indicates there is an article about the rivalry between the two participants.

=== Semi-finals ===
12 October 2019
16:00

Labasa	5-0	Nadi
Ilisoni Logaivau 36', 68'; Ashnil Raju 45'; Atonio Tuivuna 50'; Akuila Mateisuva 87'

Prince Charles Park
Referee: Veer Singh
12 October 2019
18:00

Suva	1-0	Ba
Christopher Wasasala 88'

Prince Charles Park
Referee: Salesh Chand

=== Final ===
13 October 2019
16:00

Labasa	1-0	Suva
Dennis Ifunaoa

Prince Charles Park

== Awards ==
- Golden Boot - Christopher Wasasala (Suva)
- Golden Ball - Atonio Tuivuna (Labasa)
- Fair Play Team - Suva
- New Find - Melvin Reddy (Labasa)
- Semi-finals MVP - Gagame Feni (Suva)
- Final MVP - Dennis Ifunaoa (Labasa)

== See also ==
- 2019 Vodafone Senior League
- 2019 Fiji Premier League
- 2019 Inter-District Championship - Senior Division
- 2019 Fiji Battle of the Giants
- 2019 Fiji Football Association Cup Tournament
