= 2016 Fiji National Football League =

- Season: 2016
- Champions: Ba (20th title)
- Relegated: Nadroga

The 2016 Fiji National Football League was the 40th season of the Fiji National Football League organized by the Fiji Football Association since its establishment in 1977.

== Standings ==
Pos	Team	Pld	W	D	L	GF	GA	GD	Pts	Qualification or relegation
1	Ba (C)	14	10	2	2	30	11	+19	32	2017 OFC Champions League Group Stage
2	Rewa	14	9	2	3	24	16	+8	29	2017 OFC Champions League Group Stage
3	Lautoka	14	7	3	4	33	16	+17	24	
4	Labasa	14	5	3	6	19	14	+5	18	
5	Suva	14	5	3	6	21	32	−11	18	
6	Nadi	14	4	3	7	14	22	−8	15	
7	Dreketi	14	3	4	7	14	32	−18	13	
8	Nadroga (R)	14	3	0	11	13	25	−12	9	Relegation to the 2017 Fiji Senior League

Updated to match(es) played on 16 November 2016. Source: rsssf.com and fijivillage.com
Rules for classification: 1) points; 2) goal difference; 3) number of goals scored.
(C) Champions; (R) Relegated
