= Fiji women's national under-20 football team =

National association football team

Fiji women's U20
- Nickname: Bula Girls
- Association: Fiji Football Association
- Confederation: OFC (Oceania)
- Head coach: Saroj Kumar
- Most caps: 8 players with 5 caps
- Top scorer: Luisa Tamanitoakula (7)
- Home stadium: ANZ National Stadium
- FIFA code: FIJ
First colours	Second colours

FIFA ranking
- Current: 123 ▼7
- Highest: 69 (2003)
- Lowest: 133 (2014)

First international
- American Samoa 0–0 Fiji (Nuku'alofa, Tonga; April 23, 2002)

Biggest win
- Tonga 0–4 Fiji (Auckland, New Zealand; July 11, 2017)

Biggest defeat
- Fiji 0–11 France (Medelin, Colombia; September 6, 2024)

OFC U-20 Women's Championship
- Appearances: 5 (first in 2002)
- Best result: Second Place (2017, 2023)

FIFA U-20 Women's World Cup
- Appearances: 1 (first in 2024)
- Best result: Group Stage (2024)

The Fiji women's national under-20 football team is the second highest women's youth team of women's football in Fiji and is controlled by the Fiji Football Association.

== History ==
Fiji participated five times at the OFC U-19 Women's Championship so far. In 2002, 2006 and 2019 they were eliminated in the group stages. At their third participation, in 2017, they became second.

In 2002 Fiji drew their first ever game at this level, a 0–0 against American Samoa. They fought for their first win but it wasn't meant to be after two losses: a 2–1 against Samoa and an 8–0 against New Zealand.

In 2006 Fiji were again searching for their first win ever. They had to wait for their final group game, but they got it in the end. After two defeats against again Samoa (3-0) and a heavy 6–1 against Papua New Guinea they won by 3 goals to nil against New Caledonia. Savaia Ratu was the top scorer of the tournament with two goals.

After reaching the goal of winning their first game there was more to celebrate nine years later, in 2017. Fiji became second after three wins, a draw and only one loss against football giants New Zealand. Fiji managed to get the victory's against Tonga (4-0), Papua New Guinea (3-2) and again New Caledonia (2-1). Fiji managed to score a lot of goals with Luisa Tamanitoakula scoring seven goals and Cema Nasau who scored four goals. Although Fiji scored a total of 12 goals, they still had a negative goal scoring tally with conceding 14 goals. Most of those goals were against New Zealand, after that ended in 9–1 loss.

In 2023, they finished second again after losing 0–7 to New Zealand. Eventually, after the announcement of the expansion of the 2024 FIFA U-20 Women's World Cup to 24 teams, Fiji took the new second spot as OFC representative, which will mark their first time in a World Cup.

== Competitive Record ==
=== FIFA U-20 Women's World Cup ===
FIFA U-20 Women's World Cup record
Year	Result	Position	Pld	W	D*	L	GF	GA
(Canada) 2002	Did not qualify							
(Thailand) 2004	Did not qualify							
(Russia) 2006	Did not qualify							
(Chile) 2008	Did not qualify							
(Germany) 2010	Did not qualify							
(Japan) 2012	Did not qualify							
(Canada) 2014	Did not qualify							
(Papua New Guinea) 2016	Did not qualify							
(France) 2018	Did not qualify							
(Costa Rica) 2022	Did not qualify							
(Colombia) 2024	Group stage	24th	3	0	0	3	0	29
(Poland) 2026	To be determined							
Total	—	1/12	3	0	0	3	0	29

*Draws include knockout matches decided on penalty kicks.

=== OFC Championship Record ===
OFC U-20 Women's Championship
Year	Round	Pld	W	D	L	GF	GA	GD
(Tonga) 2002	Group stage	3	0	1	2	1	10	–9
(Papua New Guinea) 2004	Did not Participate							
(Samoa) 2006	Group stage	3	1	0	2	4	9	–5
(New Zealand) 2010	Did not Participate							
(New Zealand) 2012	Did not Participate							
(New Zealand) 2014	Did not Participate							
(Tonga) 2015	Did not Participate							
(New Zealand) 2017	Runners-up	5	3	1	1	12	14	–2
(Cook Islands) 2019	Group stage	3	2	0	1	4	2	+2
(Fiji) 2023	Runners-up	5	3	0	2	6	11	–5
(French Polynesia) 2025	Third Place	4	2	1	1	4	4	0
Total	5/10	23	11	3	9	31	50	–19

== Current technical staff ==
Position	
Director	(Fiji) Susan Wise
Head coach	(Fiji) Saroj Kumar
Assistant Coach	(Fiji) Sunil Kumar
Assistant Coach	(Fiji) Alisi Uluibatiki
Goalkeeper Coach	(Fiji) Lice Waqaliti
Physio	(Fiji) Titilia Tuwai
Team Manager	(Fiji) Merewai Turaganikeli

== Current squad ==
Squad for the 2024 FIFA U-20 Women's World Cup

No.	Pos.	Player	Date of birth (age)	Caps	Goals	Club
1	GK	Meresani Waqali	21 April 2004 (aged 20)			(Fiji Football Association) Ba FC
2	DF	Ema Mereaia	29 October 2006 (aged 17)			(Fiji Football Association) Labasa FC
3	MF	Adi Bakaniceva (captain)	9 March 2004 (aged 20)			(Fiji Football Association) Rewa FC
4	DF	Seruwaia Laulaba	27 December 2007 (aged 16)			(Fiji Football Association) Tailevu Naitasiri FC
5	DF	Caroline Qalivere	8 March 2007 (aged 17)			(Fiji Football Association) Lautoka FC
6	DF	Talei Moodie	10 February 2004 (aged 20)			(United States Soccer Federation) Cal State Fullerton Titans
7	FW	Kasanita Tabua	28 May 2007 (aged 17)			(Fiji Football Association) Tailevu Naitasiri FC
8	MF	Preeya Singh	19 August 2004 (aged 20)			(United States Soccer Federation) Manteca FC
9	FW	Narieta Leba	18 August 2004 (aged 20)			(Fiji Football Association) Labasa FC
10	FW	Elesi Tabunase	12 August 2008 (aged 16)			(Fiji Football Association) Ba FC
11	DF	Sereana Naweni	3 October 2006 (aged 17)			(Fiji Football Association) Ba FC
12	MF	Pijila Kilawaca	27 December 2005 (aged 18)			(Fiji Football Association) Navua FC
13	FW	Sonia Alfred	22 January 2004 (aged 20)			(Fiji Football Association) Labasa FC
14	DF	Adi Naiveli	28 November 2005 (aged 18)			(Fiji Football Association) Nadi FC
15	DF	Asela Cokanasiga	22 May 2005 (aged 19)			(Fiji Football Association) Ba FC
16	MF	Evivi Buka	27 July 2004 (aged 20)			(Fiji Football Association) Ba FC
17	FW	Asenaca Naio	19 June 2008 (aged 16)			(Fiji Football Association) Ba FC
18	MF	Katarina Nailele	21 November 2005 (aged 18)			(Fiji Football Association) Tailevu Naitasiri FC
19	DF	Angeline Rekha	29 September 2004 (aged 19)			(Fiji Football Association) Ba FC
20	GK	Aliana Vakaloloma	13 October 2008 (aged 15)			(United States Soccer Federation) Spokane Shadow
21	GK	Emily Esposito	20 January 2007 (aged 17)			(Fiji Football Association) Nasinu FC

== 2019 squad ==
The following players were called up for the 2019 OFC U-19 Women's Championship from 30 August–12 September in Avarua, the Cook Islands.

Caps and goals updated as of 6 September 2019, after the game against Vanuatu.

No.	Pos.	Player	Date of birth (age)	Caps	Goals	Club
1	GK	Maria Elder Parr	22 February 2000 (age 26)	3	0	(Fiji Football Association) Ba
20	GK	Seru Vasuitoga	21 October 2002 (age 24)	0	0	(Fiji Football Association) Nasinu
2	DF	Lusiana Lagilevu	22 March 2001 (age 25)	3	0	(Fiji Football Association) Ba
4	DF	Amelia Cevariki	12 August 2001 (age 25)	0	0	(Fiji Football Association) Navua
5	DF	Laniana Qereqeretabua	22 May 2002 (age 24)	3	1	(Fiji Football Association) Ba
15	DF	Losana Bainivalu	19 December 2001 (age 24)	0	0	(Fiji Football Association) Tailevu Naitasiri
17	DF	Titilia Waqabaca	18 May 2001 (age 25)	1	0	(Fiji Football Association) Ba
18	DF	Fulori Sukulu	2 July 2002 (age 24)	3	0	(Fiji Football Association) Ba
19	DF	Vitalina Naikore	25 August 2000 (age 26)	3	0	(Fiji Football Association) Labasa
3	MF	Ledua Senisea	14 April 2000 (age 26)	6	0	(Fiji Football Association) Nadi
6	MF	Sainiana Niubalavu	21 March 2001 (age 25)	1	0	(Fiji Football Association) Ba
7	MF	Koleta Likuculacula (captain)	17 August 2000 (age 26)	8	1	(Fiji Football Association) Ba
8	MF	Adi Bakaniceva	9 March 2004 (age 22)	3	0	(Fiji Football Association) Tailevu Naitasiri
11	MF	Emily Rokociri	12 November 2001 (age 24)	2	0	(Fiji Football Association) Tailevu Naitasiri
12	MF	Louisa Simmons	3 March 2000 (age 26)	4	0	(Fiji Football Association) Ba
13	MF	Kelera Radinicalia	31 July 2001 (age 25)	0	0	(Fiji Football Association) Navua
16	MF	Dilaisana Drodrolagi	17 February 2001 (age 25)	3	0	(New Zealand Football) Papatoetoe
9	FW	Asenaca Diranuve	25 May 2000 (age 26)	7	3	(Fiji Football Association) Savusavu
10	FW	Asilika Gasau	15 February 2001 (age 25)	3	0	(Fiji Football Association) Suva
14	FW	Anasimeci Volitikoro	9 May 2002 (age 24)	2	0	(Fiji Football Association) Labasa

== 2017 squad ==
The following players were called up for the 2017 OFC U-19 Women's Championship

Caps and goals correct after match against New Caledonia on July 24, 2017.

No.	Pos.	Player	Date of birth (age)	Caps	Goals	Club
1	GK	Ateca Tuwai	9 June 1998 (age 28)	5	0	(Fiji Football Association) Ba
20	GK	Maria Parr	22 February 2000 (age 26)	0	0	(Fiji Football Association)
2	DF	Cecelia Nainima	20 May 1999 (age 27)	5	0	(Fiji Football Association) Ba
3	DF	Mereoni Tora	26 October 1998 (age 27)	3	0	(Fiji Football Association) Ba
4	DF	Sekola Waqanidrola	18 March 1998 (age 28)	5	0	(Fiji Football Association) Rewa
5	DF	Veniana Ranadi	16 July 1998 (age 28)	5	0	(Fiji Football Association) Ba
17	DF	Miliana Bureitau	19 May 1999 (age 27)	3	0	(Fiji Football Association) Navua
19	DF	Laca Tikosaya	13 April 2000 (age 26)	1	0	(Fiji Football Association) Ba
6	MF	Ledua Senisea	14 April 2000 (age 26)	4	0	(Fiji Football Association) Nadi
7	MF	Koleta Likuculacula	17 August 2000 (age 26)	5	0	(Fiji Football Association) Ba
8	MF	Tinaima Vuniyayawa	31 July 1998 (age 28)	5	0	(Fiji Football Association) Rewa
11	MF	Cema Nasau	15 November 1999 (age 26)	5	3	(Fiji Football Association) Ba
12	MF	Silina Qarawaqa	10 January 1999 (age 27)	1	0	(Fiji Football Association) Ba
13	MF	Louisa Simmons	3 March 2000 (age 26)	1	0	(Fiji Football Association) Ba
15	MF	Maca Ralagi	5 June 1999 (age 27)	1	0	(Fiji Football Association) Rewa
16	MF	Aliza Hussein	23 July 2000 (age 26)	4	0	(Fiji Football Association) Ba
9	FW	Asenaca Diranuve	25 May 2000 (age 26)	4	1	(Fiji Football Association) Savusavu
10	FW	Luisa Tamanitoakula	28 July 1998 (age 28)	5	7	(Fiji Football Association) Ba
14	FW	Miriama Bakaniceva	21 January 2000 (age 26)	3	0	(Fiji Football Association) Tailevu Naitasiri
18	FW	Cynthia Dutt	3 September 2000 (age 26)	1	0	(Fiji Football Association) Labasa

== Head-to-head record ==
The following table shows Fiji's head-to-head record in the FIFA U-20 Women's World Cup.

Opponent	Pld	W	D	L	GF	GA	GD	Win %
Brazil	1	0	0	1	0	9	−9	0.00
Canada	1	0	0	1	0	9	−9	0.00
France	1	0	0	1	0	11	−11	0.00
Total	3	0	0	3	0	29	−29	0.00
