= 2025 Fiji Women's Super League =

Fiji Women's Super League
- Season: 2025
- Dates: 1 March—14 September
- Champions: Ba

The 2025 Fiji Women's Super League was the 5th season of the Fiji Women's Super League, the top-level competition for women's association football in Fiji. The competition took place from 1 March to 14 September 2025.

== Format ==
Six teams will participate in the league, down from seven in the previous season. The three lowest-ranked teams from the previous season took place in a round-robin tournament, with the two highest finishers advancing to the Super League.

== Team changes ==
Nadroga lost the 2024 playoff that determined which teams would remain in the league.

== League table ==
Pos	Team	Pld	W	D	L	GF	GA	GD	Pts
1	Ba (C)	15	14	0	1	111	13	+98	42
2	Labasa	15	11	1	3	109	20	+89	34
3	Rewa	15	9	2	4	85	15	+70	29
4	Suva	15	5	1	9	25	63	−38	16
5	Nadi	15	3	2	10	29	46	−17	11
6	Tailevu Naitasiri	15	0	0	15	7	219	−212	0

Source: Fiji Football Association
(C) Champions

== Results ==
=== Matchweek 1–10 ===
Home \ Away	BA	LAB	NAD	REW	SUV	TAI
Ba	—	4–2	7–0			
Labasa		—		2–1		15–1
Nadi			—	2–2		
Rewa	2–1		3–0	—	3–0	14–0
Suva	1–4	0–5	0–0		—	6–1
Tailevu Naitasiri	0–15	1–11	0–0			—

Updated to match(es) played on 26 April 2025. Source: Fiji Football Association
Legend: Blue = home team win; Yellow = draw; Red = away team win.

=== Matchweek 11–15 ===
Home \ Away	BA	LAB	NAD	REW	SUV	TAI
Ba	—			—	—	—
Labasa	—	—	—		—	
Nadi	—		—			—
Rewa		—	—	—		
Suva			—	—	—	
Tailevu Naitasiri		—		—	—	—

Updated to match(es) played on 26 April 2025. Source: Fiji Football Association
