= 2019 Fiji Battle of the Giants =

2019 Battle of The Giants
- Season: 2019
- Champions: Labasa
- Matches: 16
- Goals: 44 (2.75 per match)
- Top goalscorer: Sairusi Nalaubu (Suva) (6 goals)
- Highest scoring: Suva 8-1 Tavua

The 2019 Battle of the Giants is the 41st season of Battle of the Giants a football competition held every year, under the auspices of the Fiji Football Association in which the top district teams take part.

The competition, which started in 1978, was due to the foresight of J.D. Maharaj, who saw it as a way of earning money for cash starved football associations in Fiji. This was the first time that a football competition in Fiji was sponsored by businesses. The competition has been held every year except 1987, when restrictions placed by the military government on organised competitions on Sunday led to all soccer competitions in Fiji being abandoned.

== Teams ==
The 8 teams from 2019 Fiji Premier League play the Battle of The Giants.

Team	Location
Ba	Ba
Labasa	Labasa
Lautoka	Lautoka
Nadi	Nadi
Nasinu	Nasinu
Rewa	Nausori
Suva	Suva
Tavua	Tavua

== Group stage ==
The 8 teams were split in two groups with four teams each. The top two advanced to semifinal.

=== Group A ===
Pos	Team	Pld	W	D	L	GF	GA	GD	Pts
1	Labasa	3	2	1	0	4	0	+4	7
2	Suva	3	1	2	0	8	1	+7	5
3	Ba	3	1	1	1	1	2	−1	4
4	Tavua	3	0	0	3	1	11	−10	0

Updated to match(es) played on 11 August 2019. Source:

==== Results ====
Home \ Away	BAF	TAV	SUV	LAB
Ba	—	1–0	0–0	0–2
Navua		—	1–8	0–2
Suva			—	0–0
Labasa				—

Updated to match(es) played on 11 August 2019. Source:
Legend: Blue = home team win; Yellow = draw; Red = away team win.
For upcoming matches, an "a" indicates there is an article about the rivalry between the two participants.

=== Group B ===
Pos	Team	Pld	W	D	L	GF	GA	GD	Pts
1	Lautoka	3	2	1	0	7	1	+6	7
2	Nasinu	3	1	1	1	2	5	−3	4
3	Nadi	3	1	0	2	4	3	+1	3
4	Rewa	3	0	2	1	2	6	−4	2

Updated to match(es) played on 11 August 2019. Source:

==== Results ====
Home \ Away	NAS	REW	NAD	LAU
Nasinu	—	0–1	1–0	0–4
Rewa		—	0–4	1–1
Nadi			—	0–2
Lautoka				—

Updated to match(es) played on 11 August 2019. Source:
Legend: Blue = home team win; Yellow = draw; Red = away team win.
For upcoming matches, an "a" indicates there is an article about the rivalry between the two participants.

== Semi-finals ==
10 August 2019
18:30

Nasinu	0-3	Labasa
	Report	Ilisoni Lolaivalu 8', 15'; Dennis Ifunaoa 15'

Churchill Park
Attendance: 5000
Referee: Avinesh Narayan
10 August 2019
20:30

Lautoka	4-1	Suva
Zibraaz Zahib 27'; Dave Radrigai 41'; Benjamin Totori 90'; Samuela Drudru 90'	Report	Gagame Feni 49'

Churchill Park
Referee: Ravitesh Behari

== 3rd-place match ==
11 August 2019
14:00

Nasinu	2-4	Suva
Iskieli Ratucava 11'; Jone Naraba 42'	Report	Sairusi Nalaubu 21', 31'; Ratu Apenisa 25', 59'

Churchill Park
Referee: Adriu Naisiroki

== Final ==
11 August 2019
16:00

Labasa	1-0	Lautoka
Siotame Kubu 80'	Report

Churchill Park
Referee: Ravitesh Behari

== Top scorers ==
As of match 1 September 2019

Rank	Player	Club	Goals
1	(Fiji) Sairusi Nalaubu	Suva	6
2	(Solomon Islands) Gagame Feni	Suva	3
2	(Fiji) Ratu Apenisa	Suva	3
2	(Fiji) Ilisoni Lolaivalu	Labasa	3

== See also ==
- 2019 Vodafone Senior League
- 2019 Fiji Premier League
- 2019 Inter-District Championship
- 2019 Inter-District Championship - Senior Division
- 2019 Fiji Football Association Cup Tournament
