= Sairusi Nalaubu =

Fijian footballer (born 1996)

Personal information
- Full name: Sairusi Sainitiki Waitawa Nalaubu
- Date of birth: 14 December 1996 (age 29)
- Place of birth: Fiji
- Height: 1.85 m (6 ft 1 in)
- Positions: Striker; winger

Team information
- Current team: Navua

Senior career*
| Years | Team | Apps | (Gls) |
| 2015–2017 | Suva | 25 | (14) |
| 2017–2018 | Rewa | 12 | (2) |
| 2018–2019 | Lautoka | 9 | (3) |
| 2019–2020 | Suva | 25 | (14) |
| 2021–2025 | Lautoka | 73 | (54) |
| 2025– | Navua | 16 | (3) |

International career^{‡}
| 2022– | Fiji | 25 | (10) |
Medal record
Men's football
Representing Fiji
Pacific Games
| Bronze medal – third place | 2023 Solomon Islands |
MSG Prime Minister's Cup
| Runner-up | 2024 Solomon Islands |
- * Club domestic league appearances and goals ‡ National team caps and goals as of 13 December 2025

Sairusi Sainitiki Waitawa Nalaubu (born 14 December 1996) is a Fijian footballer who plays as a striker, or winger for Fiji Premier League club Navua and the Fiji national team.

== Club career ==
Nalaubu, playing for Suva F.C., was the golden boot winner for the 2020 Fiji Premier League and the 2020 FF Cup.

== International career ==
Nalaubu made his international debut for the Fiji national team on 10 March 2022 by scoring a hat-trick in a 3–0 friendly win against Vanuatu.

On 18 March 2022, Nalaubu scored a brace in a 2–1 victory against New Caledonia in a 2022 FIFA World Cup qualification.

== Career statistics ==
=== International ===
Appearances and goals by national team and year
| National team | Year | Apps | Goals |
|---|---|---|---|
| Fiji | 2022 | 5 | 5 |
| Fiji | 2023 | 6 | 2 |
| Fiji | 2024 | 13 | 3 |
| Fiji | 2025 | 1 | 0 |
| Total | | 25 | 10 |

Scores and results list Fiji's goal tally first, score column indicates score after each Nalaubu goal.

List of international goals scored by Sairusi Nalaubu
| No. | Date | Venue | Opponent | Score | Result | Competition | Ref. |
|---|---|---|---|---|---|---|---|
| 1 | 10 March 2022 | Qatar University Stadium, Doha, Qatar | Vanuatu | 1–0 | 3–0 | Friendly | |
| 2 | 10 March 2022 | Qatar University Stadium, Doha, Qatar | Vanuatu | 2–0 | 3–0 | Friendly | |
| 3 | 10 March 2022 | Qatar University Stadium, Doha, Qatar | Vanuatu | 3–0 | 3–0 | Friendly | |
| 4 | 18 March 2022 | Suheim bin Hamad Stadium, Doha, Qatar | New Caledonia | 1–0 | 2–1 | 2022 FIFA World Cup qualification | |
| 5 | 18 March 2022 | Suheim bin Hamad Stadium, Doha, Qatar | New Caledonia | 2–1 | 2–1 | 2022 FIFA World Cup qualification | |
| 6 | 18 November 2023 | SIFF Academy Field, Honiara, Solomon Islands | Northern Mariana Islands | 4–0 | 10–0 | 2023 Pacific Games | |
| 7 | 18 November 2023 | SIFF Academy Field, Honiara, Solomon Islands | Northern Mariana Islands | 6–0 | 10–0 | 2023 Pacific Games | |
| 8 | 12 December 2024 | Lawson Tama Stadium, Honiara, Solomon Islands | Vanuatu | 1–0 | 1–1 | 2024 MSG Prime Minister's Cup | |
| 9 | 15 December 2024 | National Stadium, Honiara, Solomon Islands | Papua New Guinea | 1–1 | 1–1 | 2024 MSG Prime Minister's Cup | |
| 10 | 21 December 2024 | Lawson Tama Stadium, Honiara, Solomon Islands | Solomon Islands | 2–0 | 3–1 | 2024 MSG Prime Minister's Cup | |

== Honours ==
=== Player ===
Suva F.C.

- Fiji Premier League: 2020

Lautoka F.C.

- Fiji Premier League: 2021

Fiji

- Pacific Games: Bronze Medalist, 2023
- MSG Prime Minister's Cup: Runner-up, 2024

=== Individual ===
- Fiji Premier League Golden Boot: (2020, 2021, 2022).
