= 2023 Champion versus Champion =

Tournament details
- Dates: 4–11 February 2023
- Teams: 2

Final positions
- Champions: Suva F.C.
- Runners-up: Rewa F.C.

Tournament statistics
- Matches played: 2
- Goals scored: 3 (1.5 per match)

The 2023 Champion versus Champion was the 30th edition of the Champion versus Champion tournament. The tournament consisted of the winner of the 2022 Fiji Premier League and the 2022 Digicel FA Cup Tournament. Suva won the tournament on aggregate 2–1.

== Teams ==
Two teams participated in the tournament.

Team	Location
Suva	Suva
Rewa	Nausori

== Format ==
The format was a two-leg aggregate match between the two teams.

== Match 1 ==
9 June 2023

Suva	2–1	Rewa

HFC Bank Stadium, Suva

== Match 2 ==
9 June 2023

Rewa	0–0	Suva

Foodcity Ratu Cakobau Park, Nausori
