= 2019 FF Cup =

- Season: 2019
- Champions: Nadi
- Matches: 16
- Goals: 69 (4.31 per match)
- Top goalscorer: Gagame Feni (Suva) (6 goals)
- Highest scoring: Lautoka 8-2 Tavua

The 2019 Fiji Football Cup (FF Cup) was the 29th edition of FF Cup. The tournament started with the eight participants from the 2019 Fiji Premier League. The tournament was won by Nadi who defeated Suva in the final by 2-1.

== Teams ==
The eight teams from 2019 Fiji Premier League participated in the 2019 FF Cup.

=== Participants ===
Team	Location
Ba	Ba
Labasa	Labasa
Lautoka	Lautoka
Nadi	Nadi
Nasinu	Nasinu
Rewa	Nausori
Suva	Suva
Tavua	Tavua

== Group stage ==
The 8 teams were split in two groups with four teams each. The top two advanced to semifinal.

=== Group A ===
Pos	Team	Pld	W	D	L	GF	GA	GD	Pts
1	Lautoka (Q)	3	2	1	0	11	4	+7	7
2	Suva (Q)	3	1	2	0	8	3	+5	5
3	Labasa	3	1	1	1	10	4	+6	4
4	Tavua	3	0	0	3	4	22	−18	0

Updated to match(es) played on 12 May 2019. Source:
(Q) Qualified for the phase indicated

==== Results ====
Home \ Away	LAU	TAV	SUV	LAB
Lautoka	—	8–2	1–1	2–1
Navua		—	1–6	1–8
Suva			—	1–1
Labasa				—

Updated to match(es) played on 12 May 2019. Source:
Legend: Blue = home team win; Yellow = draw; Red = away team win.
For upcoming matches, an "a" indicates there is an article about the rivalry between the two participants.

=== Group B ===
Pos	Team	Pld	W	D	L	GF	GA	GD	Pts
1	Ba (Q)	3	2	1	0	8	3	+5	7
2	Nadi (Q)	3	1	1	1	3	5	−2	4
3	Rewa	3	1	0	2	5	5	0	3
4	Nasinu	3	0	2	1	3	6	−3	2

Updated to match(es) played on 12 May 2019. Source:
(Q) Qualified for the phase indicated

==== Results ====
Home \ Away	NAS	REW	NAD	BAF
Nasinu	—	0–3	1–1	2–2
Rewa		—	1–2	1–3
Nadi			—	0–3
Ba				—

Updated to match(es) played on 12 May 2019. Source:
Legend: Blue = home team win; Yellow = draw; Red = away team win.
For upcoming matches, an "a" indicates there is an article about the rivalry between the two participants.

== Semi-finals ==
11 May 2019
13:30

Lautoka	2-3	Nadi
Kolinio Sivoki 35'; Sairusi Nalaubu 75'	Report	Rahul Krishna 15'; Jeshal Kumar 53'; Tito Vodowaqa 68'

Churchill Park
Attendance: 5000
Referee: Avinesh Narayan
11 May 2019
15:30

Ba	(4) 1-1 (5)	Suva
Narend Rao 47'	Report	Gagame Feni 24'

Churchill Park
Referee: Veer Singh

== 3rd-place match ==
12 May 2019
13:00

Ba	3-4	Lautoka
Manasa Nawakula 29'; Saula Waqa 36'; Sanaila Waqanicakau 90!'	Report	Samuela Drudru 10'; Kavaia Rawaqa 48'; Sairusi Nalaubu 67'; Navneel Nand 71'

Churchill Park
Referee: Ravitesh Behari

== Final ==
12 May 2019
15:00

Nadi	2-1	Suva
Rusiate Matarerega 46'; Remueru Tekiate (o.g.)	Report	Filipe Baravilala 10'

Churchill Park
Referee: Veer Singh

== See also ==
- 2019 Vodafone Senior League
- 2019 Fiji Premier League
- 2019 Fiji Battle of the Giants
