= 2025 Champion versus Champion =

2023 Champion versus Champion
Tournament details
- Dates: 31 January–8 February 2025
- Teams: 2

Final positions
- Champions: Rewa
- Runners-up: Labasa

Tournament statistics
- Matches played: 2
- Goals scored: 4 (2 per match)

The 2025 Champion versus Champion was the 32nd edition of the Champion versus Champion tournament. The tournament consisted of the winner of the 2024 Fiji Premier League and the 2024 Fiji Football Association Cup Tournament. Rewa won the tournament 4–0 on aggregate.

== Background ==
The prize money for the tournament winner was five thousand dollars. The tournament was played at Subrail Park and Ratu Cakobau Park.

== Matches ==
31 January 2025
13:30

Rewa	3–0	Labasa

Subrail Park, Labasa, Fiji

8 February 2025
15:00

Labasa	0–1	Rewa

Ratu Cakobau Park, Nausori, Fiji

Rewa won 4–0 on aggregate.
