= 2013–14 OFC Champions League =

Tournament details
- Host countries: Fiji (group stage); American Samoa (preliminary stage)
- Dates: 15–19 October 2013 (preliminary stage); 7 April – 18 May 2014 (final stage)
- Teams: 12 (final stage); 15 (total) (from 11 associations)

Final positions
- Champions: (New Zealand) Auckland City (6th title)
- Runners-up: (Vanuatu) Amicale

Tournament statistics
- Matches played: 29
- Goals scored: 110 (3.79 per match)
- Top scorer(s): (French Polynesia) Naea Bennett (Argentina) Emiliano Tade (6 goals each)
- Best player: (Argentina) Emiliano Tade
- Best goalkeeper: (Vanuatu) Chikau Mansale

The 2013–14 OFC Champions League was the 13th edition of the Oceanian Club Championship, Oceania's premier club football tournament organized by the Oceania Football Confederation (OFC), and the 8th season under the current OFC Champions League name.

Auckland City became the first team to win four consecutive and six overall titles after defeating Amicale in the final. As the winner of the 2014 OFC Champions League, they earned the right to represent the OFC at the 2014 FIFA Club World Cup. Both finalists also earned invitations to participate in the 2014 OFC President's Cup.

== Format change ==
Location of teams of the 2013–14 OFC Champions League.
Teams entering the group stage
Teams entering the preliminary stage

The OFC decided to change the format once again for the 2014 edition:

- The competition consisted of two stages – preliminary stage and final stage (group stage, semi-finals, and final).
- For the preliminary stage, like in the previous season, four teams from the four weakest associations took part in this stage, with the tournament played in round-robin format at a single venue. From this season, the preliminary stage winner was granted direct qualification to the group stage.
- For the group stage, 12 teams took part in this stage (increase from 8 teams in the past), and more importantly, it was played in a single country. Four associations were awarded two berths each, three associations were awarded one berth each, and one berth was given to the preliminary stage winner. The 12 teams were divided into three groups of four teams (teams from the same association may not be placed into the same group), where each group was played in round-robin format, with the group winners and the best runner-up progressing to the semi-finals.
- For the semi-finals, like in the previous season, the two ties were played in home-and-away format over two legs.
- For the final, the OFC Executive Committee decided that it was played in home-and-away format over two legs, instead of over one match at a pre-determined venue like in the previous season.

== Teams ==
A total of 15 teams from all 11 OFC associations entered the competition. The four associations with the best results in the 2012–13 OFC Champions League (Fiji, New Zealand, Tahiti, Vanuatu) were awarded two berths each, and three other associations (New Caledonia, Papua New Guinea, Solomon Islands) were awarded one berth each. Those teams directly entered the group stage, to be joined by the winner of the preliminary stage, which was contested by teams from the four developing associations (American Samoa, Cook Islands, Samoa, Tonga).

Association	Team	Qualifying method
Teams entering the group stage
Fiji	Ba	2013 Fiji National Football League champion
Fiji	Nadi	2013 Fiji National Football League runner-up
New Caledonia	Magenta	2012 New Caledonia Division Honneur champion
New Zealand	Waitakere United	2012–13 ASB Premiership grand final champion 2012–13 ASB Premiership regular season premier
New Zealand	Auckland City	2012–13 ASB Premiership regular season runner-up
Papua New Guinea	Hekari United	2013 Papua New Guinea National Soccer League champion
Solomon Islands	Solomon Warriors	2013–14 Telekom S-League champion
(French Polynesia) Tahiti	Dragon	2012–13 Tahiti Ligue 1 champion
(French Polynesia) Tahiti	Pirae	2013–14 Tahiti Ligue 1 regular phase winner
Vanuatu	Tafea	2013 Vanuatu National Super League champion
Vanuatu	Amicale	2013 Vanuatu National Super League runner-up
Teams entering the preliminary stage
American Samoa	Pago Youth	2012 FFAS Senior League champion
Cook Islands	Tupapa Maraerenga	2012 Cook Islands Round Cup champion
Samoa	Kiwi	2011–12 Samoa National League champion
Tonga	Lotoha'apai United	2011–12 Tonga Major League champion

== Schedule ==
The schedule of the competition was as follows.

Stage		Date
Preliminary stage (Host: American Samoa)	Matchday 1	15 October 2013
Preliminary stage (Host: American Samoa)	Matchday 2	17 October 2013
Preliminary stage (Host: American Samoa)	Matchday 3	19 October 2013
Group stage (Host: Fiji)	Matchday 1	7–9 April 2014
Group stage (Host: Fiji)	Matchday 2	10–12 April 2014
Group stage (Host: Fiji)	Matchday 3	13–15 April 2014
Semi-finals (Home-and-away)	First leg	26–27 April 2014
Semi-finals (Home-and-away)	Second leg	3–4 May 2014
Final (Home-and-away)	First leg	10–11 May 2014
Final (Home-and-away)	Second leg	17–18 May 2014

== Preliminary stage ==
The preliminary stage was played in Pago Pago, American Samoa from 15 to 19 October 2013 (all times UTC−11). The draw to determine the fixtures was held on 8 October 2013 at the OFC Headquarters in Auckland, New Zealand. The four teams played each other on a round-robin basis. The group winner advanced to the group stage to join the 11 automatic qualifiers.

Team	Pld	W	D	L	GF	GA	GD	Pts
(Samoa) Kiwi	3	3	0	0	12	3	+9	9
(Cook Islands) Tupapa Maraerenga	3	2	0	1	14	4	+10	6
(Tonga) Lotoha'apai United	2	0	0	2	2	7	−5	0
(American Samoa) Pago Youth	2	0	0	2	2	16	−14	0

15 October 2013
12:00

Lotoha'apai United (Tonga)	0–3	(Cook Islands) Tupapa Maraerenga
	Report	Best 10'; Harmon 83'; Fowler 87'

Pago Park Soccer Stadium, Pago Pago
Attendance: 900
Referee: Salesh Chand (Fiji)
16 October 2013
9:00

Kiwi (Samoa)	5–1	(American Samoa) Pago Youth
Gaughan 14' (pen.), 30', 66'; Cowan 23', 39'	Report	Kang 60'

Pago Park Soccer Stadium, Pago Pago
Attendance: 700
Referee: Matt Conger (New Zealand)

Note: The Kiwi v Pago Youth match was originally scheduled to be played on 15 October 2013, 15:00 local time, but was postponed to the next day due to heavy rain.

17 October 2013
12:00

Lotoha'apai United (Tonga)	2–4	(Samoa) Kiwi
Moala 10'; M. Uhatahi 15'	Report	Mason 12'; Cowan 32', 51'; Gaughan 59'

Pago Park Soccer Stadium, Pago Pago
Attendance: 800
Referee: Isaac Trevis (New Zealand)
17 October 2013
15:00

Pago Youth (American Samoa)	1–11	(Cook Islands) Tupapa Maraerenga
Kang 1'	Report	Paulus 17', 71' (pen.); Best 45+1'; Strickland 50' (pen.); Margetts 54', 60' (pen.), 78', 87'; Ruka 85'; Turepu 90'; Harmon 90+3'

Pago Park Soccer Stadium, Pago Pago
Attendance: 900
Referee: Campbell-Kirk Waugh (New Zealand)

19 October 2013
12:00

Pago Youth (American Samoa)	Cancelled	(Tonga) Lotoha'apai United

Pago Park Soccer Stadium, Pago Pago
Referee: Salesh Chand (Fiji)

Note: The Pago Youth v Lotoha'apai United match was cancelled due to heavy rain and the fact that neither team could advance to the group stage.

19 October 2013
14:30

Tupapa Maraerenga (Cook Islands)	0–3	(Samoa) Kiwi
	Report	Cowan 22'; Mason 27'; Gaughan 88'

Pago Park Soccer Stadium, Pago Pago
Attendance: 1,000
Referee: Matt Conger (New Zealand)

== Group stage ==
The group stage was played in Ba and Lautoka, Fiji from 7 to 15 April 2014 (all times UTC+12). The 12 teams were divided into three groups of four, with the restriction that teams from the same association not be placed into the same group. The draw to determine the fixtures was held on 7 February 2014 at the OFC Headquarters in Auckland, New Zealand. In each group, the four teams played each other on a round-robin basis. The group winners and the best runner-up advanced to the semi-finals.

=== Group A ===
Team	Pld	W	D	L	GF	GA	GD	Pts
(French Polynesia) Pirae	3	3	0	0	13	2	+11	9
(Solomon Islands) Solomon Warriors	3	1	1	1	10	3	+7	4
(New Zealand) Waitakere United	3	1	1	1	4	4	0	4
(Samoa) Kiwi	3	0	0	3	0	18	−18	0

9 April 2014
13:00

Kiwi (Samoa)	0–2	(New Zealand) Waitakere United
	Report	French 19'; Totori 32'

Churchill Park, Lautoka
Referee: Nawen Hopken (Vanuatu)
9 April 2014
16:00

Solomon Warriors (Solomon Islands)	1–2	(French Polynesia) Pirae
Naka 56'	Report	Vahirua 12'; Tepa 26'

Churchill Park, Lautoka
Referee: Salesh Chand (Fiji)

12 April 2014
13:00

Pirae (French Polynesia)	8–0	(Samoa) Kiwi
N. Bennett 5', 6', 22', 90'; Vahirua 25'; Li Fung Kuee 37' (pen.), 45+2'; Dallera 73'	Report

Churchill Park, Lautoka
Referee: Bertrand Billon (New Caledonia)
12 April 2014
16:00

Waitakere United (New Zealand)	1–1	(Solomon Islands) Solomon Warriors
Seda 86' (o.g.)	Report	Naka 45'

Churchill Park, Lautoka
Referee: Salesh Chand (Fiji)

15 April 2014
13:00

Kiwi (Samoa)	0–8	(Solomon Islands) Solomon Warriors
	Report	Naka 6'; Lea'alafa 8', 20', 26', 89'; Ifunaoa 42'; Donga 59'; Feni 68'

Churchill Park, Lautoka
Referee: Ravitesh Behari (Fiji)
15 April 2014
16:00

Pirae (French Polynesia)	3–1	(New Zealand) Waitakere United
Li Fung Kuee 1'; N. Bennett 17'; Tepa 90+2'	Report	Stevens 56'

Churchill Park, Lautoka
Referee: Bertrand Billon (New Caledonia)

=== Group B ===
Team	Pld	W	D	L	GF	GA	GD	Pts
(Vanuatu) Amicale	3	3	0	0	8	0	+8	9
(New Zealand) Auckland City	3	2	0	1	6	1	+5	6
(French Polynesia) Dragon	3	1	0	2	5	4	+1	3
(Fiji) Nadi	3	0	0	3	0	14	−14	0

Group B matches were originally scheduled to be played in Prince Charles Park, Nadi, but the venue was withdrawn after inspection by the OFC.

8 April 2014
13:00

Amicale (Vanuatu)	1–0	(French Polynesia) Dragon
Sakama 19'	Report

Churchill Park, Lautoka
Referee: Gerald Oiaka (Solomon Islands)
8 April 2014
16:00

Auckland City (New Zealand)	3–0	(Fiji) Nadi
Moreira 12'; Kim 23'; Tade 40'	Report

Churchill Park, Lautoka
Referee: Bertrand Billon (New Caledonia)

11 April 2014
13:00

Dragon (French Polynesia)	0–3	(New Zealand) Auckland City
	Report	Kim 14'; Tade 48'; Moreira 59'

Churchill Park, Lautoka
Referee: Nawen Hopken (Vanuatu)
11 April 2014
16:00

Nadi (Fiji)	0–6	(Vanuatu) Amicale
	Report	Đorđević 59'; Vasilić 73', 89', 90+3'; Tangis 85', 90'

Churchill Park, Lautoka
Referee: Norbert Hauata (Tahiti)

14 April 2014
13:00

Nadi (Fiji)	0–5	(French Polynesia) Dragon
	Report	A. Tehau 33'; T. Tehau 62'; Chong Hue 69'; Tetauira 75'; Vero 84' (pen.)

Churchill Park, Lautoka
Referee: Matt Conger (New Zealand)
14 April 2014
16:00

Amicale (Vanuatu)	1–0	(New Zealand) Auckland City
Fred 45+1'	Report

Churchill Park, Lautoka
Referee: Norbert Hauata (Tahiti)

=== Group C ===
Team	Pld	W	D	L	GF	GA	GD	Pts
(Fiji) Ba	3	2	1	0	7	1	+6	7
(New Caledonia) Magenta	3	1	1	1	5	5	0	4
(Vanuatu) Tafea	3	1	0	2	4	8	−4	3
(Papua New Guinea) Hekari United	3	0	2	1	4	6	−2	2

7 April 2014
13:00

Tafea (Vanuatu)	3–1	(Papua New Guinea) Hekari United
Damalip 9'; Nawo 29'; Mansale 81'	Report	Tanito 41' (pen.)

Govind Park, Ba
Referee: Matt Conger (New Zealand)
7 April 2014
16:00

Magenta (New Caledonia)	0–2	(Fiji) Ba
	Report	Vakatalesau 19'; Zahid 90+1'

Govind Park, Ba
Referee: Norbert Hauata (Tahiti)

10 April 2014
13:00

Ba (Fiji)	4–0	(Vanuatu) Tafea
Dunadamu 48', 51'; Rao 83'; Nakama 90'	Report

Govind Park, Ba
Referee: Matt Conger (New Zealand)
10 April 2014
16:00

Hekari United (Papua New Guinea)	2–2	(New Caledonia) Magenta
Dabinyaba 51'; Muri 65'	Report	Kaï 62'; Wajoka 71'

Govind Park, Ba
Referee: Gerald Oiaka (Solomon Islands)

13 April 2014
13:00

Tafea (Vanuatu)	1–3	(New Caledonia) Magenta
Kalo 63' (pen.)	Report	Nicholls 31'; Kaï 45'; Gnipate 81'

Govind Park, Ba
Referee: Gerald Oiaka (Solomon Islands)
13 April 2014
16:00

Ba (Fiji)	1–1	(Papua New Guinea) Hekari United
Suwamy 66' (pen.)	Report	Tanito 37'

Govind Park, Ba
Referee: Nawen Hopken (Vanuatu)

=== Ranking of second-placed teams ===
Grp	Team	Pld	W	D	L	GF	GA	GD	Pts
B	(New Zealand) Auckland City	3	2	0	1	6	1	+5	6
A	(Solomon Islands) Solomon Warriors	3	1	1	1	10	3	+7	4
C	(New Caledonia) Magenta	3	1	1	1	5	5	0	4

== Knockout stage ==
=== Semi-finals ===
In the semi-finals, the four teams were divided into two ties. In each tie, the two teams played each other on a home-and-away two-legged basis. The winners advanced to the final. The first legs were played on 26 and 27 April 2014, and the second legs were played on 3 May 2014.

==== First leg ====
26 April 2014
14:00 UTC+12

Auckland City (New Zealand)	3–0	(French Polynesia) Pirae
Tade 36', 90+3'; Moreira 68'	Report

Kiwitea Street, Auckland
Referee: Bruce George (Vanuatu)

27 April 2014
13:00 UTC+12

Ba (Fiji)	1–2	(Vanuatu) Amicale
Suwamy 11'	Report	Fred 59'; Tangis 60'

Govind Park, Ba
Referee: Kader Zitouni (Tahiti)

==== Second leg ====
3 May 2014
14:30 UTC+11

Amicale (Vanuatu)	0–0	(Fiji) Ba
	Report

Port Vila Municipal Stadium, Port Vila
Referee: George Time (Solomon Islands)

Amicale won 2–1 on aggregate.

3 May 2014
20:45 UTC−10

Pirae (French Polynesia)	2–1	(New Zealand) Auckland City
Tepa 4'; N. Bennett 40'	Report	Moreira 45'

Stade Pater Te Hono Nui, Pirae
Referee: Isidore Assiene-Ambassa (New Caledonia)

Auckland City won 4–2 on aggregate.

=== Final ===
In the final, the two teams played each other on a home-and-away two-legged basis. The draw to determine the order of two legs was held on 30 April 2014 at the OFC Headquarters in Auckland, New Zealand. The first leg was played on 10 May 2014, and the second leg was played on 18 May 2014.

==== First leg ====
10 May 2014
14:00 UTC+11

Amicale (Vanuatu)	1–1	(New Zealand) Auckland City
Fred 75'	Report	Tade 29'

Port Vila Municipal Stadium, Port Vila
Attendance: 10,000
Referee: Kader Zitouni (Tahiti)

==== Second leg ====
18 May 2014
14:00 UTC+12

Auckland City (New Zealand)	2–1	(Vanuatu) Amicale
De Vries 67'; Tade 87'	Report	Tangis 45+1'

Kiwitea Street, Auckland
Attendance: 3,000
Referee: Norbert Hauata (Tahiti)

Auckland City won 3–2 on aggregate.

== Awards ==
Preliminary stage
Award	Player	Team
Golden Ball	(New Zealand) Byron Paulus	(Cook Islands) Tupapa Maraerenga
Golden Boot	(New Zealand) Adam Cowan	(Samoa) Kiwi
Golden Boot	(Samoa) Joseph Gaughan	(Samoa) Kiwi
Golden Gloves	(American Samoa) Taufaiula Mavaega	(American Samoa) Pago Youth

Final stage (Group stage, Semi-finals, Final)
Award	Player	Team
Golden Ball	(Argentina) Emiliano Tade	(New Zealand) Auckland City
Golden Boot	(French Polynesia) Naea Bennett	(French Polynesia) Pirae
Golden Boot	(Argentina) Emiliano Tade	(New Zealand) Auckland City
Golden Gloves	(Vanuatu) Chikau Mansale	(Vanuatu) Amicale
Fair Play Award	Football fans of Vanuatu	

== Top goalscorers ==
Preliminary stage
Rank	Player	Team	Goals
1	(New Zealand) Adam Cowan	(Samoa) Kiwi	5
1	(Samoa) Joseph Gaughan	(Samoa) Kiwi	5
3	(New Zealand) Sam Margetts	(Cook Islands) Tupapa Maraerenga	4

Final stage (Group stage, Semi-finals, Final)
Rank	Player	Team	Goals
1	(French Polynesia) Naea Bennett	(French Polynesia) Pirae	6
1	(Argentina) Emiliano Tade	(New Zealand) Auckland City	6
3	(Solomon Islands) Micah Lea'alafa	(Solomon Islands) Solomon Warriors	4
3	(Portugal) João Moreira	(New Zealand) Auckland City	4
3	(Vanuatu) Kensi Tangis	(Vanuatu) Amicale	4
6	(Vanuatu) Dominique Fred	(Vanuatu) Amicale	3
6	(French Polynesia) Raimana Li Fung Kuee	(French Polynesia) Pirae	3
6	(Solomon Islands) James Naka	(Solomon Islands) Solomon Warriors	3
6	(French Polynesia) Jimmy Tepa	(French Polynesia) Pirae	3
6	(Serbia) Nikola Vasilić	(Vanuatu) Amicale	3

== See also ==
- 2014 FIFA Club World Cup
- 2014 OFC President's Cup
