= 2019 Inter-District Championship – Senior Division =

Fijian football championship

2019 Inter-District Championship - Senior Division
- Season: 2019
- Champions: Navua
- Matches: 15
- Goals: 44 (2.93 per match)
- Top goalscorer: Jonas Nacewa (Nadroga); 4 Goals

The 2019 Inter-District Championship (IDC) is the 34th season of Inter-District Championship. It is the last championship of the 2019 Fijian football season. The 2019 IDC started on 8 October and ii sponsored by Courts.

== Teams ==
Despite having 12 teams in 2019 Vodafone Senior League only 8 teams compete in 2019 IDC Senior Division. 2019 Vodafone Senior League had two groups of six teams each. The top five teams from Viti Levu Zone and the top three teams from Vanua Levu Zone play IDC Senior Division.

== Group stage ==
The 8 teams were split in two groups with four teams each.

=== Group A ===
Pos	Team	Pld	W	D	L	GF	GA	GD	Pts
1	Lami (Q)	3	2	1	0	9	1	+8	7
2	Savusavu (Q)	3	1	2	0	2	1	+1	5
3	Dreketi	3	0	2	1	3	9	−6	2
4	Northland Tailevu	3	0	1	2	3	6	−3	1

Updated to match(es) played on 10 October 2019. Source:
(Q) Qualified for the phase indicated

==== Results ====
Home \ Away	SAV	NOR	LAM	DRE
Savusavu	—	2–1	0–0	0–0
Northland Tailevu		—	0–2	2–2
Lami			—	7–1
Dreketi				—

Updated to match(es) played on 10 October 2019. Source:
Legend: Blue = home team win; Yellow = draw; Red = away team win.
For upcoming matches, an "a" indicates there is an article about the rivalry between the two participants.

=== Group B ===
Pos	Team	Pld	W	D	L	GF	GA	GD	Pts
1	Nadroga (Q)	3	2	1	0	6	2	+4	7
2	Navua (Q)	3	2	1	0	6	3	+3	7
3	Tailevu Naitasiri	3	0	1	2	2	5	−3	1
4	Seaqaqa	3	0	1	2	3	7	−4	1

Updated to match(es) played on 10 October 2019. Source:
(Q) Qualified for the phase indicated

==== Results ====
Home \ Away	NAV	TAI	NAG	SEA
Navua	—	2–1	1–1	3–1
Tailevu Naitasiri		—	0–2	1–1
Nadroga			—	
Seaqaqa			1–3	—

Updated to match(es) played on 10 October 2019. Source:
Legend: Blue = home team win; Yellow = draw; Red = away team win.
For upcoming matches, an "a" indicates there is an article about the rivalry between the two participants.

=== Semi-finals ===
12 October 2019
11:00

Lami	2-4	Navua
Jasnit Vikash 10'; Apisai Sesewa 82'		Joseph Elder 42'; Vineet Chand 61'; Sharad Kumar 78'; Thomas Dunn 81'

Prince Charles Park
Referee: Kavtesh Behari
12 October 2019
13:00

Nadroga	2-1	Savusavu
Jonas Nacewa 41', 65'		Shavneet Chandra 29'

Prince Charles Park
Referee: Deepak Raj

=== Final ===
13 October 2019
14:00

Nadroga	0-1	Navua
		Alfred Ali 83'

Prince Charles Park
Referee: Deepak Raj

== Awards ==
- Golden Boot - Jonas Nacewa (Nadroga)
- Golden Ball - Seveci Rokotakala (Navua)
- Fair Play Team - Navua
- New Find - Thomas Dunn (Navua)
- Day 1 MVP - Ravnit Chand (Lami)
- Day 2 MVP - Seveci Rokotakala (Navua)
- Day 3 MVP - Krishneel Dutt (Nadroga)
- Final MVP - Alfred Ali (Navua)

== See also ==
- 2019 Vodafone Senior League
- 2019 Fiji Premier League
- 2019 Inter-District Championship
- 2019 Fiji Battle of the Giants
- 2019 Fiji Football Association Cup Tournament
