= Girmit Soccer Tournament =

Girmit Soccer Tournament is a football tournament organised in Fiji by the Fiji Football Association. The tournament was first held in 1979 to commemorate the centenary of the arrival of Indians in Fiji, under the indenture system, known as girmit by the Fiji Indians.

The first tournament ended in controversy when Labasa was awarded the Girmit Cup when Ba defaulted the final game. The tournament was revived in 1999 when Nadi beat Ba in the final by one goal to nil.
