= 2026 Fiji Women's Super League =

Fiji Women's Super League
- Season: 2026
- Dates: 28 March—7 November

The 2026 Fiji Women's Super League is the 6th season of the Fiji Women's Super League, the top-level competition for women's association football in Fiji. The competition will take place from 28 March to 7 November 2026.

== League table ==
Pos	Team	Pld	W	D	L	GF	GA	GD	Pts
1	Labasa	10	8	1	1	65	10	+55	25
2	Ba	9	8	0	1	68	9	+59	24
3	Rewa	9	5	1	3	22	13	+9	16
4	Lautoka	9	3	0	6	13	50	−37	9
5	Nadi	9	2	0	7	9	59	−50	6
6	Suva	10	1	0	9	6	42	−36	3

Updated to match(es) played on 15 August 2026. Source: Fiji Football Association
