= 2022 Fiji Premier League =

2023 season of the Fiji Premier League

- Season: 2022
- Champions: Rewa (1st title)
- Relegated: Nasinu
- OFC Champions League: Rewa; Suva
- Matches played: 45
- Biggest home win: Ba 5–0 Nadroga (5 March 2022)
- Biggest away win: Navua 0–5 Nadi (11 September 2022)
- Highest scoring: Lautoka 6–2 Navua (20 February 2022)

The 2022 Fiji Premier League, also known as the 2022 Digicel Premier League for sponsorship reasons, was the 46th season of the Fiji Premier League, the highest level of the Fijian football league system. The season began on 13 February and ended on 11 September.

Rewa won their first title, while defending champions Lautoka finished second. Nasinu finished last and were relegated back to the Senior League after just one season.

== Teams ==
Location of teams in the 2022 Fiji Premier League

Club	Location	Stadium
Ba	Ba	Govind Park
Labasa	Labasa	Subrail Park
Lautoka	Lautoka	Churchill Park
Nadi	Nadi	Prince Charles Park
Nadroga	Sigatoka	Lawaqa Park
Nasinu	Nasinu	Nasinu Park
Navua	Navua	Thomson Park
Rewa	Nausori	Ratu Cakobau Park
Suva	Suva	HFC Bank Stadium
Tailevu	Nausori	Ratu Cakobau Park

== League table ==
Pos	Team	Pld	W	D	L	GF	GA	GD	Pts	Qualification or relegation
1	Rewa (C, Q)	18	9	8	1	26	14	+12	35	Qualification to OFC Champions League national play-offs
2	Suva	18	10	5	3	20	11	+9	35	Qualification to OFC Champions League national play-offs
3	Lautoka	18	9	5	4	38	25	+13	32	
4	Nadi	18	9	5	4	30	20	+10	32	
5	Ba	18	9	2	7	36	28	+8	29	
6	Labasa	18	6	4	8	23	27	−4	22	
7	Nadroga	9	3	2	4	18	22	−4	11	
8	Navua	18	4	6	8	19	31	−12	18	
9	Tailevu	18	3	5	10	20	26	−6	14	
10	Nasinu (R)	18	2	3	13	13	34	−21	9	Relegation to Fiji Senior League

Updated to match(es) played on 20 May 2024. Source: Fiji FA
(C) Champions; (Q) Qualified for the phase indicated; (R) Relegated
