= Savenaca Baledrokadroka =

Fijian footballer

Personal information
- Full name: Savenaca Tabilai Baledrokadroka
- Date of birth: 20 May 1999 (age 27)
- Place of birth: Lautoka, Fiji
- Position: Midfielder

Team information
- Current team: Baxter SC

Youth career
- –2017: Rewa

Senior career*
Years	Team	Apps	(Gls)
2017–2019	Rewa		
2019	Nasinu		
2019–2020	Rewa		
2020–2024	Frankston Pines	14	(5)
2024-	Baxter SC		

International career
2016–2018	Fiji U20	6	(0)
2019	Fiji U23	5	(2)
2018–	Fiji	7	(0)
Medal record
Men's football
Representing Fiji
Pacific Games
Bronze medal – third place	2019 Samoa
- * Club domestic league appearances and goals

Savenaca Baledrokadroka (born 20 May 1999) is a Fijian footballer who plays as a midfielder for Australian club Baxter SC and the Fiji national team.

== Club career ==
Baledrokadroka started his career in the youth of Rewa. In 2017 he made his debut for the first team. In the first half of 2019 he moved to Nasinu. However, he performed so well for the team that Rewa took him back after half a year. In January 2020 he moved, together with fellow countrymens Peni Tuigulagula, Tito Vodowaqa and Asaeli Batikasa to Australian based club Frankston Pines before making the move to Baxter in 2024.

== National team ==
In 2018 Baledrokadroka was called up by coach Christophe Gamel for the Fiji national football team. He made his debut on July 5, 2018, in a 1–0 loss against Malaysia. He came in for Mitieli Namuka in the 34th minute of play. In 2019, he was selected for the 2019 Pacific Games. Fiji won a bronze medal.

== Honours ==
Fiji

- Pacific Games: Bronze Medalist, 2019
