= Mohammed Ayman =

Fijian footballer

Personal information
- Date of birth: 9 June 2005 (age 21)
- Place of birth: Fiji
- Position: Defender

Team information
- Current team: Nadi
- Number: 5

Youth career
- Blues FC
- –2023: Nadi Futsal

Senior career*
Years	Team	Apps	(Gls)
2023–2026	Nadi	29	(2)
2026	Bula	3	(0)
2026–	Nadi	6	(1)

International career^{‡}
2024	Fiji U20	5	(0)
2025–	Fiji	3	(0)
- * Club domestic league appearances and goals as of 29 May 2026 ‡ National team caps and goals as of 29 May 2026

Mohammed Ayman (born 9 June 2005) is a Fijian professional footballer who plays as a defender for OFC Professional League club Nadi and the Fiji national football team.

== Club career ==
Ayman played with Blues FC in the Nadi local leagues, before playing futsal, and eventually signing for Fiji Premier League team Nadi F.C. in 2023. He made 29 appearances over 3 seasons, scoring two goals.

Ayman signed for newly created Fijian club Bula FC, for the inaugural season of the OFC Professional League.

== International career ==
Ayman was part of the Fiji team for the 2024 OFC U-19 Men's Championship, playing in 5 matches.

Ayman earned his first Fiji senior call-up in 2025 for their March 2026 World Cup qualifier against New Zealand, yet didn't make his debut until the 2025 King's Cup in Thailand, in which he made 2 appearances against Thailand and Hong Kong.
