= Peni Tuigulagula =

Fijian footballer

Personal information
- Full name: Peni Tuigulagula
- Date of birth: 8 March 1999 (age 27)
- Place of birth: Fiji
- Position: Defender

Team information
- Current team: Frankston Pines
- Number: 14

Youth career
- –2018: Nadi

Senior career*
Years	Team	Apps	(Gls)
2018–2020	Nadi		
2020–2021	Frankston Pines	13	(0)
2022–	Heatherton United	3	(0)

International career
2018	Fiji U20	3	(0)
2019	Fiji U23	4	(0)
2019–	Fiji	4	(0)
Medal record
Men's football
Representing Fiji
Pacific Games
Bronze medal – third place	2019 Samoa
- * Club domestic league appearances and goals

Peni Tuigulagula (born 8 March 1999) is a Fijian footballer who plays as a defender for Australian club Frankston Pines and the Fiji national team.

== Club career ==
Tuigulagula came through the youth ranks of Nadi. In 2018 he made his debut for the first team. In 2020 he moved, together with fellow countrymens Tito Vodowaqa, Savenaca Baledrokadroka and Asaeli Batikasa to the Australian based club Frankston Pines FC.

== National team ==
In 2019 Tuigulagula was called up by coach Christophe Gamel for the Fiji national football team. He made his debut on March 18, 2019, in a 3–0 win against New Caledonia. He came in for Nicholas Prasad in the 85th minute of play. In 2019, he was selected for the 2019 Pacific Games. Fiji won a bronze medal.

== Honours ==
Fiji

- Pacific Games: Bronze Medalist, 2019
