= Ba Women FC =

- League: Fiji Women's Super League
- 2026: 2nd

Ba Women FC is a Fijian women's association football club based in Ba that competes in the Fiji Women's Super League, the top-level competition for women's football in Fiji.

== History ==
Ba participated in the Women's Inter-District Championship (IDC) as early as 2002. When the Fiji Women's Super League was first founded in 2021, Ba won all ten matches and won the inaugural title. After finishing as runners-up to Labasa in the following two seasons, Ba won their second title in 2024.

Following their third title in 2025, FIFA president Gianni Infantino congratulated the team through a letter. They also won that year's edition of the IDC.
