= 2014 OFC President's Cup =

Tournament details
- Host country: New Zealand
- City: Auckland
- Dates: 17–23 November 2014
- Teams: 6 (from 3 confederations)
- Venue: 1 (in 1 host city)

Final positions
- Champions: (New Zealand) Auckland City (1st title)
- Runners-up: (Vanuatu) Amicale
- Third place: (Bahrain) Busaiteen
- Fourth place: Singapore U-23

Tournament statistics
- Matches played: 9
- Goals scored: 36 (4 per match)
- Top scorer: (Argentina) Emiliano Tade (4 goals)
- Best player: (Australia) Panny Nikas
- Best goalkeeper: (Cayman Islands) Ramon Sealy
- Fair play award: (Vanuatu) Amicale

The 2014 OFC President's Cup was the first edition of the OFC President's Cup, a competition organised by the Oceania Football Confederation (OFC) between invitational club and/or national sides. A decision to create this competition was confirmed at the OFC's executive committee in March 2014. The inaugural competition took place in Auckland, New Zealand between 17 and 23 November 2014, with Auckland City defeating Amicale in the final to win the 2014 President's Cup.

== Format ==
A total of six teams participated in the tournament: the reigning OFC Champions League winners and runners-up, two teams from the Asian Football Confederation and one team from Concacaf.

The competition was played in two groups of three teams with the top team in each group advancing to the final, and the remaining teams advancing to the third and fifth place matches.

== Teams ==
The OFC formally announced the participating teams on 19 September 2014.

Confederation	Team	Qualifying method
OFC	(New Zealand) Auckland City	2013–14 OFC Champions League winners
OFC	(Vanuatu) Amicale	2013–14 OFC Champions League runners-up
OFC	Fiji U-20	2014 OFC U-20 Championship winners
AFC	(Bahrain) Busaiteen	2012–13 Bahrain First Division League winners
AFC	Singapore U-23	Invited
CONCACAF	(Cayman Islands) Bodden Town	2013–14 Cayman Islands Premier League winners

== Venue ==
The tournament was staged at the Trusts Arena in Auckland, New Zealand.

== Group stage ==
The draw for the group stage was held on 8 October 2014 at the OFC Headquarters in Auckland, New Zealand. The six teams were drawn into two groups of three, with Auckland City and Busaiteen seeded. In each group, the three teams played each other on a round-robin basis. The group winners advanced to the final, the runners-up advanced to the third place match, and the third-placed teams advanced to the fifth place match.

All times UTC+13.

=== Group A ===
Pos	Team	Pld	W	D	L	GF	GA	GD	Pts	Qualification
1	(New Zealand) Auckland City	2	2	0	0	13	0	+13	6	Final
2	Singapore U-23	2	0	1	1	0	4	−4	1	Third place match
3	(Cayman Islands) Bodden Town	2	0	1	1	0	9	−9	1	Fifth place match

Source: OFC
17 November 2014
17:00

Auckland City (New Zealand)	4–0	Singapore U-23
Berlanga 12'; Kim 44'; Bilen 71'; Milne 73'	Report

Trusts Arena, Auckland
Referee: Ravitesh Behari (Fiji)

19 November 2014
17:00

Bodden Town (Cayman Islands)	0–0	Singapore U-23
	Report

Trusts Arena, Auckland
Referee: Albert Maru (Papua New Guinea)

21 November 2014
17:00

Auckland City (New Zealand)	9–0	(Cayman Islands) Bodden Town
Tade 3', 44', 50'; White 45+2'; De Vries 63', 90+2'; Matsumoto 66'; Tavano 72'; Burfoot 81'	Report

Trusts Arena, Auckland
Referee: Nelson Sogo (Solomon Islands)

=== Group B ===
Pos	Team	Pld	W	D	L	GF	GA	GD	Pts	Qualification
1	(Vanuatu) Amicale	2	2	0	0	5	1	+4	6	Final
2	(Bahrain) Busaiteen	2	1	0	1	8	3	+5	3	Third place match
3	Fiji U-20	2	0	0	2	1	10	−9	0	Fifth place match

Source: OFC
17 November 2014
19:30

Fiji U-20	0–3	(Vanuatu) Amicale
	Report	Ucchino 29'; Grazia 39'; Nikas 85'

Trusts Arena, Auckland
Referee: Nick Waldron (New Zealand)

19 November 2014
19:30

Amicale (Vanuatu)	2–1	(Bahrain) Busaiteen
Sakama 54'; Nikas 80'	Report	Cruz 43'

Trusts Arena, Auckland
Referee: Nelson Sogo (Solomon Islands)

21 November 2014
19:30

Busaiteen (Bahrain)	7–1	Fiji U-20
Ajaj 26', 39', 73'; Sultan 29'; Malek 34'; Cruz 75', 88'	Report	Budhaish 50' (o.g.)

Trusts Arena, Auckland
Referee: Nick Waldron (New Zealand)

== Final stage ==
=== Fifth place match ===
23 November 2014
13:00

Bodden Town (Cayman Islands)	3–0	Fiji U-20
Brown 29'; Wood 53'; Ebanks 64'	Report

Trusts Arena, Auckland
Referee: Nelson Sogo (Solomon Islands)

=== Third place match ===
23 November 2014
16:00

Singapore U-23	0–3	(Bahrain) Busaiteen
	Report	Alroomi 67'; Nayem 70', 83'

Trusts Arena, Auckland
Referee: Nick Waldron (New Zealand)

=== Final ===
23 November 2014
19:00

Auckland City (New Zealand)	2–1	(Vanuatu) Amicale
Tade 63'; De Vries 79'	Report	Sakama 41'

Trusts Arena, Auckland
Referee: Ravitesh Behari (Fiji)

== Final ranking ==
Rank	Team
1st place, gold medalist(s)	(New Zealand) Auckland City
2nd place, silver medalist(s)	(Vanuatu) Amicale
3rd place, bronze medalist(s)	(Bahrain) Busaiteen
4	Singapore U-23
5	(Cayman Islands) Bodden Town
6	Fiji U-20

== Awards ==
Award	Player	Team
Golden Ball	(Australia) Panny Nikas	(Vanuatu) Amicale
Golden Boot	(Argentina) Emiliano Tade	(New Zealand) Auckland City
Golden Gloves	(Cayman Islands) Ramon Sealy	(Cayman Islands) Bodden Town
Fair Play Award	—	(Vanuatu) Amicale

== Top goalscorers ==
Rank	Player	Team	Goals
1	(Argentina) Emiliano Tade	(New Zealand) Auckland City	4
2	(Bahrain) Mohamed Ajaj	(Bahrain) Busaiteen	3
2	(Brazil) Eliel Cruz	(Bahrain) Busaiteen	3
2	(New Zealand) Ryan De Vries	(New Zealand) Auckland City	3
5	(Bahrain) Hesham Nayem	(Bahrain) Busaiteen	2
5	(Australia) Panny Nikas	(Vanuatu) Amicale	2
5	(Vanuatu) François Sakama	(Vanuatu) Amicale	2
