= Ilimotama Jese =

Fijian footballer

Personal information
- Date of birth: 16 March 1990 (age 36)
- Place of birth: Fiji
- Position: Defender

Team information
- Current team: Nadi F.C.

Senior career*
Years	Team	Apps	(Gls)
2014–	Nadi F.C.		

International career^{‡}
2015–	Fiji	8	(0)
Medal record
Men's football
Representing Fiji
Pacific Games
Bronze medal – third place	2023 Solomon Islands
- * Club domestic league appearances and goals as of 3 July 2016 ‡ National team caps and goals as of 3 July 2016

Ilimotama Jese (born 16 March 1990) is a Fijian footballer who plays as a defender for Nadi F.C. in the Fijian National Football League.

== Honours ==
Fiji

- Pacific Games: Bronze Medalist, 2023
