= Tito Vodowaqa =

Fijian footballer

Personal information
- Full name: Tito Vodowaqa
- Date of birth: 9 April 1999 (age 27)
- Place of birth: Rotuma, Fiji
- Position: Forward

Team information
- Current team: Frankston Pines
- Number: 10

Youth career
- –2017: Nadi

Senior career*
| Years | Team | Apps | (Gls) |
| 2017–2020 | Nadi | | (4) |
| 2020–2021 | Frankston Pines | 11 | (6) |
| 2022– | Heatherton United | 13 | (1) |

International career
| 2018 | Fiji U20 | 3 | (1) |
| 2019 | Fiji U23 | 5 | (1) |
| 2019– | Fiji | 5 | (6) |
Medal record
Men's football
Representing Fiji
Pacific Games
| Bronze medal – third place | 2019 Samoa |
- * Club domestic league appearances and goals

Tito Vodowaqa (born 9 April 1999) is a Fijian footballer who plays as a forward for Australian club Frankston Pines and the Fiji national team.

== Club career ==
Vodowaqa came through the youth ranks of Nadi. In 2017 he made his debut for the first team. In 2020 he moved, together with fellow countrymens Peni Tuigulagula, Savenaca Baledrokadroka and Asaeli Batikasa to Australian-based club Frankston Pines.

== National team ==
In 2019 Tuigulagula was called up by coach Christophe Gamel for the Fiji national football team. He made his debut on March 18, 2019, in a 3–0 win against New Caledonia. He came in for Samuela Drudru in the 66th minute of play. In 2019, he was selected for the 2019 Pacific Games. Fiji won a bronze medal.

== Career statistics ==
=== International ===
Appearances and goals by national team and year
| National team | Year | Apps | Goals |
|---|---|---|---|
| Fiji | 2019 | 5 | 6 |
| Total | | 5 | 6 |

Scores and results list Fiji's goal tally first, score column indicates score after each Vodowaqa goal.

List of international goals scored by Tito Vodowaqa
| No. | Date | Venue | Opponent | Score | Result | Competition | Ref. |
|---|---|---|---|---|---|---|---|
| 1 | 10 July 2019 | National Soccer Stadium, Apia, Samoa | American Samoa | 1–0 | 9–0 | 2019 Pacific Games | |
| 2 | 10 July 2019 | National Soccer Stadium, Apia, Samoa | American Samoa | 2–0 | 9–0 | 2019 Pacific Games | |
| 3 | 10 July 2019 | National Soccer Stadium, Apia, Samoa | American Samoa | 6–0 | 9–0 | 2019 Pacific Games | |
| 4 | 10 July 2019 | National Soccer Stadium, Apia, Samoa | American Samoa | 7–0 | 9–0 | 2019 Pacific Games | |
| 5 | 15 July 2019 | National Soccer Stadium, Apia, Samoa | Tuvalu | 5–1 | 10–1 | 2019 Pacific Games | |
| 6 | 15 July 2019 | National Soccer Stadium, Apia, Samoa | Tuvalu | 7–1 | 10–1 | 2019 Pacific Games | |

== Honours ==
Fiji

- Pacific Games: Bronze Medalist, 2019
