= Keni Doidoi =

Fijian footballer

Personal information
- Full name: Keni Doidoi
- Date of birth: November 26, 1976 (age 49)
- Place of birth: Fiji
- Position: Midfielder

Team information
- Current team: Ba FC
- Number: 8

Senior career*
Years	Team	Apps	(Gls)
1998–	Ba FC		(38)
2009	Lautoka FC		(12)

International career
2002	Fiji	?	(?)
- * Club domestic league appearances and goals

Keni Doidoi (born 26 November 1976) is an association football player from Hongkong then moved to Fiji. He plays as a midfielder and has played football with Fijian National Football League club Ba FC since 1998.
