= Talent Development League =

- Organising body: FIFA
- Founded: 2022
- Country: Fiji
- Confederation: OFC
- Sponsor(s): McDonald's

The Talent Development League, also known as the McDonald's Talent Development league for sponsorship reasons, is an association football Fijian youth development league. Fiji was one of the eight countries chosen by the FIFA Talent Development Scheme. The league runs for twenty weeks with age groups from U9 to U15.

The league is a part of the Fiji Football Association's five-year plan focusing on youth development in the country. A joint competition was launched in 2024 as the Talent Development Inter-District Championship.

== Teams ==
160 teams from 11 districts in the country participated in the inaugural edition of the development league, with over 2500 new registered footballers.

== Seasons ==
=== 2023 ===
The first season of the league began on 6 May 2023. The event began at 9am GMT+12 and concluded after the 20-week session. Fiji national football team captain Roy Krishna participated in the competition.

=== 2024 ===
The 2024 edition began on 13 April 2024. The competitions were played simultaneously in all three districts.

=== 2025 ===
The 2025 edition began on 25 March 2025.
