= Lice Waqaliti =

Fijian footballer

Personal information
- Position: Goalkeeper

International career^{‡}
Years	Team	Apps	(Gls)
2010	Fiji	2	(0)

Managerial career
- Fiji Women U-20 (goalkeeper coach)
- ‡ National team caps and goals as of 4 October 2010

Lice "Lido" Waqaliti is a Fijian former footballer who played as a goalkeeper. She has been a member of the Fiji women's national team.

== Life and career ==
Waqaliti is from Vanua Levu. She started playing football when she was 15. She represented Fiji at the 2007 and 2011 Pacific Games. In 2016 she was assistant coach for the Fiji women's national under-17 football team at the 2016 OFC U-17 Women's Championship. In 2017 she trained the goalkeepers for the 2017 Pacific Mini Games. In 2020 she became Fiji's first female licensed football instructor. She works as a Goalkeeping Developing Officer for the Fiji Football Association.
