= Rupeni Rabici =

Fijian footballer (born 1996)

Personal information
- Date of birth: 27 November 1996 (age 29)
- Place of birth: Fiji
- Position: Defender

Team information
- Current team: Nadi

Youth career
- 2012–2015: Dreketi

Senior career*
Years	Team	Apps	(Gls)
2015–2017	Ba		
2017–	Nadi		

International career
2013	Fiji U17	4	(0)
2017–	Fiji	2	(0)
Medal record
Men's football
Representing Fiji
Pacific Mini Games
Silver medal – second place	2017 Vanuatu
- * Club domestic league appearances and goals

Rupeni Rabici (born 27 November 1996) is a Fijian footballer who plays as a defender for Fijian club Nadi and the Fiji national team.

== Early life ==
Rabici is from Galoa in the Serua District and was educated at Lomary Secondary School.

== Club career ==
Rabici started his career with Ba. However he played mainly for their youth team. Before he really broke into the first team of Ba he joined Nadi. He was suspended for two matches in 2019 after being red-carded for violent conduct in a match against Nasinu.

== International career ==
In 2017 Rabici was called up by coach Christophe Gamel for the Fiji national team. He made his debut on 19 November 2017, in a 2–0 loss against Estonia when he came in in the 90 minute of play for Laisenia Naioko.

== Honours ==
Fiji

- Pacific Mini Games: Silver Medalist, 2017
