= Fiji Football Referees Association =

Fiji Football Referees Association (FFRA) is a professional organisation representing soccer referees in Fiji. It is affiliated to the Fiji Football Association.

FFRA was formed in 1954, with Shiu Nath Sharma as the founding President, Ram Sundar Bansraj as the vice-president and Mohammed Ishaque as the secretary. Prior to 1954, referees were chosen from a pool referees who had shown ability in refereeing games. In 1961, referees wore the black uniform for the first time. In 1969, the first exams were conducted for referees. In the mid-1970s, FFRA aligned itself with international standards and a number of local referees were listed as FIFA referees. FIFA conducted a development program in Suva in 1977. In 1978 a Board of Examiners was appointed who conducted regular examinations for referees. In recent times, requirements to be appointed a referee in Fiji has been made more stringent and many FFRa referees have been appointed to the Oceania Football Confederation.

== Bibliography ==
- M. Prasad, Sixty Years of Soccer in Fiji 1938–1998: The Official History of the Fiji Football Association, Fiji Football Association, Suva, 1998.
