= Fiji Women's Super League =

- Founded: 2021
- Country: Fiji
- Confederation: OFC
- Number of clubs: 6
- Level on pyramid: 1
- Current champions: Ba Women FC (2024)
- Top scorer: Cema Nasau (65 goals)
- Current: 2025 Fiji Women's Super League

The Fiji Women's Super League is the top-level women's association football league in Fiji. It was founded in 2021 as the successor to the Fiji Women's Senior League.

== History ==
The league was founded in 2021 as the first nation-wide women's national league.

The number of participating teams was reduced to 6 for the 2025 season.

== Champions ==
Season	Champion	Runner-up	Top scorer	Goals
2021	Ba		Cema Nasau (Ba)	19
2022	Labasa		Cema Nasau (Labasa)	21
2023	Labasa			
2024	Ba		Lora Bukalidi (Rewa)	9
2025			Tavaita Tikousiva (Rewa)	27

=== All-time goalscorers ===
Rank	Player	Goals
1	Cema Nasau	65
2	Koleta Likuculacula	64
