= Tailevu North F.C. =

Fijian football club

- Full name: Tailevu North Football Club
- Nickname: Dairy Town Cowboys
- Founded: 1957
- Chairman: TBA
- Manager: TBA
- League: Fiji Senior League (Second Tier)
- 2019: TBA
Home colours

Tailevu North F.C. also known as Northland Tailevu is a Fijian football team playing in the second division of the Fiji Football Association competitions. It is based in Korovou, which is a situated on the northern side of the island of Viti Levu, some 35 kilometers from Suva.

Their uniform includes green and white.

== History ==
The Tailevu North Soccer Association was formed in 1957, under the presidency of Kunji Raman.

== See also ==
- Fiji Football Association

== Bibliography ==
- M. Prasad, Sixty Years of Soccer in Fiji 1938–1998: The Official History of the Fiji Football Association, Fiji Football Association, Suva, 1998.
