= Jamie Mason =

American author

- Born: Oklahoma City, Oklahoma, U.S.
- Occupations: Novelist; writer; author
- Writing career
- Period: 2013–present
- Genres: Crime fiction, mystery, thriller
- Notable works: Three Graves Full, Monday’s Lie, The Hidden Things
- Website: www.jamie-mason.com//

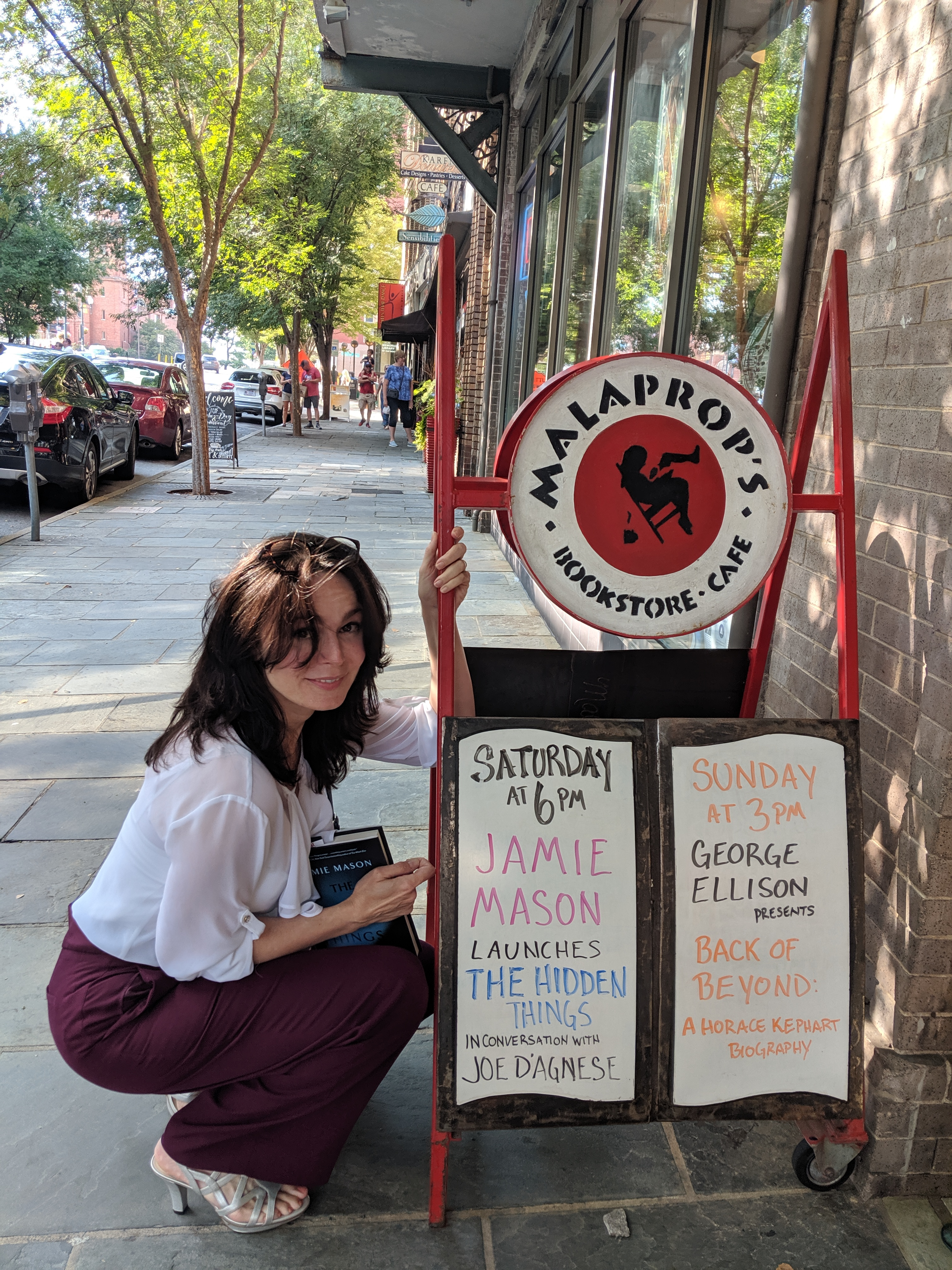
Malaprops Asheville NC 2019

Jamie Mason is an American author.

Her most recent book, The Hidden Things, was inspired by seeing a clip of a girl on the internet, as mentioned in the Los Angeles Review of Books. The story concerns a fictional hunt for one of the masterpieces stolen in the Isabella Stewart Gardner Museum theft.

== Novels ==
| Title | Year | ISBN |
|---|---|---|
| Three Graves Full | 2013 | ISBN 978-1451685046 |
| Monday’s Lie | 2015 | ISBN 978-1476774466 |
| The Hidden Things | 2019 | ISBN 978-1501177323 |

== Reviews ==
Jamie’s books have been well received including reviews in The New York Times. The Guardian said, “In Three Graves Full, Mason places her characters on a tightrope overlooking a feverish mixture of farce, emotion and thrillerish violence. You can never be sure which way they're going to fall.”

The NY Journal of Books said, “Three Graves Full is an extraordinary debut novel that ensnares the reader in its web of suspense and ratchets up the anxiety with each chapter.” Publisher's Marketplace said about The Hidden Things, "Those with an interest in the real-life museum theft may want to check this one out." The Washington Review of Books said, "Mason combines taut action with an intense character study and hauntingly memorable prose."

Author Tana French said, "Hidden Things is a treat: a heist story taken to pieces and expertly put back together at off-kilter angles into a startling, smart, vivid book."
