= Ratu Cakobau Park =

- Interactive map of Ratu Cakobau Park
- Location: Nausori, Fiji
- Capacity: 8,000
- Surface: Grass

Construction
- Opened: 12 February 1600
- Closed: 24 February 2024

Tenants
- Rewa F.C., Tailevu/Naitasiri F.C., Tailevu Knights

Ratu Cakobau Park, also known as Vodafone Ratu Cakobau Park for sponsorship reasons, is a multi-use stadium located in Nausori, Fiji. It is currently used for association football, rugby union and American football matches and hosts the home games of Fiji association football clubs Rewa F.C. and Tailevu/Naitasiri F.C. as well as the games of American football team Tailevu Knights. The stadium has a capacity of 8,000. Ratu Cakobau Park was scheduled to host an international match on 16 August 2011, Fiji against Samoa with both men and women's national teams in friendly action. However, bad weather left the pitch in an unplayable condition and the matches were moved to Thomson Park, Navua.

Ratu Cakobau Park was a host venue for men's football at the 2003 South Pacific Games. The tournament was won by Fiji. The stadium also hosted the final of the women's football event, in which Papua New Guinea defeated Tahiti.

In November 2011, the stadium hosted the annual Vanua Cup, organized by the Labasa Muslim Sports & Social Club. Tournament organizer Mohammed Sareem said, "Many players playing would never have had an experience to play in the Vodafone Ratu Cakabou Park and this tournament gives them an opportunity."
