= Frankston Pines SC =

Football club in Melbourne, Victoria, Australia

Frankston Pines
- Full name: Frankston Pines Soccer Club
- Nicknames: The Pines, Frankenstones
- Founded: 1965
- Ground: Monterey Reserve
- League: State League Division 4-South
- 2025: 12th of 12 (Relegated)
- Website: https://frankstonpinesfc.com.au
Home colours	Away colours

Frankston Pines Soccer Club is an Australian soccer club based in Frankston North, a suburb of Melbourne, Victoria. The club was formed by local Scottish Australians in 1965. Their home ground is Monterey Reserve, which holds approximately 4,000.

== History ==
The club has had several stints in the Victorian Premier League since the mid-1980s, with best finishes of runners-up in both 1986 and 2003. The club was relegated from the VPL in 2006, but took out the State League 1 championship the following year, taking them straight back up to the VPL in 2007. The Pines again struggled in the VPL in 2008, finishing bottom and being relegated to State League 1. The club endured a disastrous year in State League 1 in 2009, suffering another relegation to State League 2 South East, winning just two games all season. The downward spiral continued in 2010, finishing the season in a relegation place once more. In 2011, the club was in the State League Division 3 for the first time since 1998. The club amassed just 8 points that year, despite playing in the fourth tier of Victorian football, and were relegated to the provisional leagues.

Head manager Danny Verdun took over the club in 2012 and against all odds, the club was promoted, finishing second in the Provisional League Div 1 South-East. The club finished in 8th position in 2013 in State League Division 3 South East, but were promoted to State League Division 2 South East due to a league restructuring. Amazingly, the rebirth continued, and the club finished top of the State League Division 2 South East in 2014, achieving promotion to State League 1 South East. The club went from four successive relegation from 2008–2011 to three successive promotions from 2012 to 2014.

In January 2024, Franklin Pines SC went through a massive recruitment drive for its senior squad under senior coach Donn Delaney, following its relegation to State 3.

== Honours ==
- 1968 District League Premiers
- 1969 District League Premiers
- 1973 Provisional League Champions
- 1978 Provisional League Champions Division 1
- 1979 Metropolitan League Champions Division 4
- 1980 Metropolitan League Champions Division 3
- 1981 Metropolitan League Runners-up Division 2
- 1983 Metropolitan League Runners-up Division 1
- 1986 State League Runners-up
- 1988 Victorian League Champions Division 1
- 1991 State League Cup Winners
- 1992 State League Champions Division 2
- 2002 State League Champions Division 1
- 2003 Premier League Runners-up
- 2007 State League Champions Division 1
- 2012 Provisional League Runners-up Division 1 South East
- 2013 State League Runners-up Division 3 South East
- 2014 State League Champions Division 2 South East
- 2022 All-Abilities (AA) League Division 1 Premiership
- 2024 State League Division 3 Regulation
