= Champion versus Champion =

Association football tournament in Fiji

- Organiser(s): Oceania Football Confederation
- Current champions: Rewa F.C. (2025)

Champion versus Champion (CVC) is a football tournament organised in Fiji by the Fiji Football Association. This pair of home-and-away games are played as a season opener. In the old format the National Football League winner played the Inter-district Championship winner and in case these are the same team, the winner of the Battle of the Giants played. However, beginning at the start of 2010 season, winners of all the major tournaments in the Super Premier League, take part in this championship. In 2010, Ba (2009 Battle of the Giants Champion), Lautoka (2009 National League Champion) and Navua (2009 IDC and Fiji FACT Champion) took part in this home-away round robin game series. The team registering the highest number of points, (and in case of a tie, the best goal difference) is the winner of the title.

== Champion versus Champion winners ==
Year	National League Winner	Other Champion	Score 1	Score 2	Winner	Notes
1992	Ba	Labasa	0–0	0–1	Labasa	-
1993	Nadroga	Ba	1–0	0–2	Ba	-
1994	Ba	Labasa	1–1	1–0	Ba	-
1995	Ba	Tavua	4–1	0–0	Ba	-
1996	Suva	Ba	1–3	0–2	Ba	-
1997	Suva	Ba	0–5	1–2	Ba	-
1998	Ba	Nadi	3–0	1–2	Ba	-
1999	Ba	Nadi	2–1	0–1	Ba	Ba won after protest
2000	Nadi	Ba	0–3	1–0	Ba	-
2001	Ba	Rewa	0–0	4–1	Ba	-
2002	Ba	Nadi	3–0	4–1	Ba	-
2003	Ba	Rewa	2–2	2–0	Ba	-
2004	Ba	Rewa	2–1	1–1	Ba	-
2005	Ba	Lautoka	1–0	1–1	Ba	-
2006	Ba	Suva	1–1	6–2	Ba	-
2007	Ba	Labasa	0–1	1–2	Labasa	-
2008	Ba	Lautoka	1–0	4–2	Ba	-
2009	Navua; Lautoka; Ba	Lautoka; Ba; Navua	1–1; 0–2; 0–1	0–1; 7–0; 0–3	Lautoka	Participants: Lautoka (League champions); Navua (IDC and FACT winners); Ba (BoG winners)
2010					Rewa	Participants: Ba (League champions and FACT winners); Rewa (IDC and BoG winners); Lautoka; Navua
2011					Ba	Participants: Ba (League champions); Labasa (IDC winners); Rewa (FACT and BoG winners); Suva
2012	Ba	Suva	1–0	5–1	Ba	-
2013	Ba	Nadi	1–1	1–1	Ba	Ba won 3rd match 2–1
2014	Ba	Suva	5–3	2–1	Ba	-
2015	Suva	Nadi	0–1	1–1	Nadi	-
2016	Nadi	Suva	1–0	1–1	Nadi	-
2017	Ba	Lautoka	0–1	0–0	Lautoka	-
2018	Lautoka	Labasa	0–0	0–1	Labasa	-
2019	Lautoka	Ba	1–2	0–1	Ba	-
2020	Ba	Labasa	0–0	1–2	Labasa	-
2021	Suva	Labasa	1–1	1–2	Labasa	-
2022	Not held					
2023	Rewa	Suva	0-0	1-2	Suva	-
2024	Lautoka	Ba	2-2	1-2	Lautoka	-
2025	Rewa	Labasa	3-0	1-0	Rewa	-
