= Fiji Premier League =

Association football league in Fiji

- Logo since 2025
- Founded: 1977; 49 years ago
- Country: Fiji
- Confederation: OFC
- Number of clubs: 10
- Level on pyramid: 1
- Relegation to: Fiji Senior League
- Domestic cup(s): FF Cup; Champion versus Champion
- International cup: OFC Champions League
- Current champions: Ba (22nd title) (2026)
- Most championships: Ba (22 titles)
- Broadcaster(s): MAI TV
- Sponsor(s): Extra Supermarket, Vishnu Holdings Limited
- Website: fijifootball.com.fj
- Current: 2026 Fiji Premier League

The Fiji Premier League or the FPL, also called the Extra Premier League for sponsorship reasons, is the top division men's football league in Fiji. Contested by ten teams, it shares a promotion and relegation system with the Fiji Senior League (FSL). The League is controlled by the Fiji Football Association.

The league was founded as the Fiji National League in 1977 by the Fiji Football Association which was won by Ba. The club that has the most championships is also Ba with 22 titles.

== History ==
=== Foundation (1977) ===
In 1977, the Fiji National League (FNL) was founded. The first ever season was won by Ba.

=== Sponsorship deals ===
Since 2016, the league has been called the Vodafone Premier League after a sponsorship deal with Vodafone Fiji. On March 3, 2021, Digicel Fiji signed a 3 year deal to sponsor the league, effectively renaming the competition to the Digicel Premier League.

== Competition format ==
=== Competition ===
There are 10 clubs in the Fiji Premier League. During the course of a season, each club plays the others twice (a double round-robin system), once at their home stadium and once at that of their opponent's home. Teams receive three points for a win and one point for a draw. No points are awarded for a loss. Teams are ranked by total points, then goal difference, and then goals scored. If still equal, teams are deemed to occupy the same position. If there is a tie for the championship, for relegation, or for qualification to other competitions, a play-off match at a neutral venue decides rank.

=== Promotion and relegation ===
A system of promotion and relegation exists between the Fiji Premier League and the Senior League. The last placed team in the Fiji Premier League are relegated to the Senior League, and the first placed team from the North and South zones of Senior League are promoted to the Fiji Premier League.

== Format ==
From the inaugural 1977 season to the 2021 season, the Fiji Premier League had eight teams. However, since 2022, the league has had 10 teams.

Since 2016, the league has practiced promotion and relegation. Each season, the team that finishes last is relegated to the Senior League. The Senior League has two zones: the Vanua Levu Zone and the Viti Levu Zone. The highest-finishing clubs from each zone compete in a playoff match, the winner of which is promoted to the Premier League.

The season champion and runners-up both qualify for the OFC Champions League.

== Clubs ==
=== Current clubs ===
Location of teams in the 2025 Fiji Premier League

=== Champions ===
Club	Wins	Winning years	Longest Consecutive Wins
Ba	22	1977, 1979, 1986, 1987, 1992, 1994, 1995, 1999, 2001, 2002, 2003, 2004, 2005, 2006, 2008, 2010, 2011, 2012, 2013, 2016, 2019, 2026	2001 - 2006 (6)
Nadi	9	1978, 1980, 1981, 1982, 1983, 1985, 1998, 2000, 2015	1980 - 1983 (4)
Lautoka	7	1984, 1988, 2009, 2017, 2018, 2021, 2023	2017 - 2018 (2)
Suva	4	1996, 1997, 2014, 2020	1996 - 1997 (2)
Nadroga	3	1989, 1990, 1993	1989 - 1990 (2)
Rewa	3	2022, 2024, 2025	2024 - 2025 (2)
Labasa	2	1991, 2007	

=== League Championship (for Districts) ===
- 1977: Ba FC
- 1978: Nadi FC
- 1979: Ba FC
- 1980: Nadi FC
- 1981: Nadi FC
- 1982: Nadi FC
- 1983: Nadi FC
- 1984: Lautoka FC
- 1985: Nadi FC
- 1986: Ba FC
- 1987: Ba FC
- 1988: Lautoka FC
- 1989: Nadroga F.C.
- 1990: Nadroga F.C.
- 1991: Labasa FC
- 1992: Ba FC
- 1993: Nadroga F.C.
- 1994: Ba FC
- 1995: Ba FC
- 1996: Suva FC
- 1997: Suva FC
- 1998: Nadi FC
- 1999: Ba FC
- 2000: Nadi FC
- 2001: Ba FC
- 2002: Ba FC
- 2003: Ba FC
- 2004: Ba FC
- 2005: Ba FC
- 2006: Ba FC
- 2007: Labasa FC
- 2008: Ba FC
- 2009: Lautoka FC
- 2010: Ba FC
- 2011: Ba FC
- 2012: Ba FC
- 2013: Ba FC
- 2014: Suva FC
- 2015: Nadi FC
- 2016: Ba FC
- 2017: Lautoka FC
- 2018: Lautoka FC
- 2019: Ba FC
- 2020: Suva FC
- 2021: Lautoka FC
- 2022: Rewa FC
- 2023: Lautoka FC
- 2024: Rewa FC
- 2025: Rewa FC
- 2026: Ba FC

== Club championships ==
There have also been competitions between the clubs of Fiji, as opposed to between district teams.

=== National Club Championship ===
The National Club Championship is held each year between various champions of local leagues in Fiji. It was first played in 1986.

=== Club Franchise League ===
The Club Franchise League was only played in 2005 and 2006, to determine a team to qualify for the Oceania Club Championship.

- 2005: 4R Electric Ltd (Ba)
- 2006: Nokia Eagles (Nadi)

== Top goalscorers ==
Year	Best scorers	Team	Goals
2001	(Fiji) Lorima Batirerega	Ba FC	7
2003	(Fiji) Keni Doidoi	Ba FC	8
2006	(Fiji) Josaia Bukalidi Jr	Ba FC	23
2007	(Fiji) Maciu Dunadamu	Labasa FC	17
2008	(Fiji) Roy Krishna	Labasa FC	31
2009	(Fiji) Keni Doidoi	Lautoka FC	12
2017	(Fiji) Joel Shelvin Prasad	Labasa FC	10
2018	(Fiji) Rusiate Matarerega	Nadi FC	8
2019	(Fiji) Samuela Drudru	Lautoka FC	12
2020	(Fiji) Sairusi Nalaubu	Suva	9
2021	(Fiji) Sairusi Nalaubu	Lautoka	9
2022	(Fiji) Sairusi Nalaubu	Lautoka	12
2023	(Fiji) Sairusi Nalaubu	Lautoka	19
2024	(Fiji) Merrill Nand	Suva	11

Most time goalscorers

- 4 times
  - Sairusi Nalaubu (2020, 2021, 2022, 2023)

Most goals by a player in a single season

- 31 goals
  - Roy Krishna (2008)

== Multiple hat-tricks ==
Rank	Country	Player	Hat-tricks
1	(Fiji)	Sairusi Nalaubu	2
2	(Fiji)	Brian Charitau	1
2	(Fiji)	Simione Damuni	1
2	(Solomon Islands)	Atkin Kaua	1
2	(Fiji)	Merrill Nand	1
2	(Solomon Islands)	Junior Rocky	1
2	(Fiji)	Mohammed Shazil	1
2	(Vanuatu)	Azariah Soromon	1
2	(Fiji)	Avinesh Suwamy	1
2	(Fiji)	Saula Waqa	1
2	(Fiji)	Christopher Wasasala	1
