= Nadroga F.C. =

Fijian football club

Nadroga FA
- Full name: Nadroga Football Association
- Nickname: The Stallions
- Founded: 1938; 88 years ago
- Ground: Lawaqa Park
- Capacity: 12,000
- Chairman: Brondif
- Manager: Rishal Pratap
- League: Fiji Premier League
- 2025: 7th

Nadroga FA is a professional Fijian association football team playing in the Fiji Premier League of the Fiji Football Association. It is based in Sigatoka. They are nicknamed The Stallions. Their home stadium is Lawaqa Park.

== History ==
Nadroga F.C. came into existence in 1938, with the formation of the Nadroga Soccer Association, under the Presidency of Dildar Masih. Nadroga took part in the Inter-District Championship (IDC) for the first time in 1939, losing to the neighbouring team of Nadi by 2 goals to nil in the preliminary round.

== 2024 season ==
In late September 2024, Nadroga avoided relegation and secured its place in the next season’s Fiji Premier League when they defeated Tailevu Naitasiri 4-1 in their round 17 clash at Lawaqa Park. With only a round left to play, the win meant that Nadroga had 17 points, five points ahead of the bottom two teams, Tailevu Naitasiri and Nasinu.

== Achievements ==
- Fiji Premier League
  - Champions (3): 1989, 1990, 1993
- Fiji Senior League
  - Champions (1): 2020
- Inter-District Championship
  - Champions (3): 1988, 1989, 1993
- Inter-District Championship - Senior Division
  - Champions (3): 1999, 2017, 2020
- Inter-District Championship - Premier Division
  - Champions (1): 2023
- Battle of the Giants
  - Champions (3): 1989, 1991, 2002
- Fiji FACT
  - Champions (2): 1993, 2001

== Current squad ==
Note: Flags indicate national team as defined under FIFA eligibility rules; some limited exceptions apply. Players may hold more than one non-FIFA nationality.

No.	Pos.	Nation	Player
1	GK	FIJ	Malaki Titiko
2	DF	FIJ	Makati Pukiko
3	DF	FIJ	Etmah Kam
4	MF	NGA	Wally Bayola
5	MF	GHA	Kap Ninyo
6	DF	FIJ	Semesa Sacere
7	FW	FIJ	Paulo Buke
8	MF	FIJ	Seremaia Tuwai
9	DF	FIJ	Sajneel Sharma
10	MF	FIJ	Beniamino Lebatavatava
11	MF	FIJ	Shailesh Chand

No.	Pos.	Nation	Player
12	FW	FIJ	Taniela Raubula
13	MF	FIJ	Shyamal Narayan
14	MF	FIJ	Tomasi Tuicakau
15	FW	FIJ	Osea Vakatalesau
16	MF	FIJ	Vilitati Kautoga
17	MF	FIJ	Zain Ali
18	MF	FIJ	Krishneel Dutt
19	DF	FIJ	Gerard Voi
20	DF	FIJ	Mitieli Naiviro
21	GK	FIJ	Isikeli Sevanaia
22	GK	FIJ	Jione Naitau

== Staff ==
Position	Name
Coach	(Fiji) Varon Karan
Manager	(Fiji) Rishal Pratap
