= Fiji Football Association =

National sporting association

OFC
- Short name: FIJI FA
- Founded: 1938; 88 years ago
- Headquarters: Suva
- FIFA affiliation: 1964
- OFC affiliation: 1966
- President: Rajesh Patel
- Website: https://www.fijifootball.com.fj/

The Fiji Football Association is the governing body of football in Fiji. It came into existence in 1938. It became a provisional member of FIFA in 1963 and was fully affiliated the following year. It was a founding member of OFC in 1966. It is the overseeing body of the Fiji National Team and its leagues.

== History ==
Football started to be played in Fiji ever since the arrival of Europeans in Fiji and the establishment of towns like Levuka where significant numbers of sports enthusiasts could congregate and socialise with a friendly game. Missionaries, who established schools in Fiji, introduced football as part of the school program and football was being played in schools as early as 1889. The Suva Soccer Football Club was formed in 1905, made up of European employees of the Government and businesses, and similar clubs existed in Nausori and Levuka. In 1910, a team representing Suva played a match against a team representing Nausori. Crew of visiting naval ships also entertained themselves with friendly games of football with local teams. In 1910 a team from Suva played a game against a team from HMS Powerful and won 3 goals to 1. In 1914, a team from Suva played against a team from HMS Torch, at Albert Park, and won by 2 goals to nil.

Fijian teams started playing competitive football in 1924. The first Fijian Inter-District Tournament was played at Nasau Park, Levuka, during celebrations marking the golden jubilee of Cession in 1924. Teams played for the Ricarnie Cup which was won by the Sawani team from Naitasiri. The following year, Bau won the cup. Players played the game barefoot and relied on speed and stamina. Other teams to compete in the tournament were Shamrock from Suva, Kadavu (from Suva), Lomaiviti (from Suva) and Ovalau (from Levuka).

Meanwhile, football was also being played by Fijians in Lautoka. A Friday and Saturday league was organised at the Veitari Grounds and teams that took part were Namoli, Vitogo, Vakabuli, Saru, Yalobi (from Waya), Kadavu, Vanua Levu and Topline. The Namoli Native Soccer Club won the league nine times in a row between 1941 and 1949. A prominent member of the club was Ratu Meli Qoro, who also acted as an official and referee at tournaments. He had learnt to play football at the local Methodist Mission Primary school. In the northern division, football was played between the Wainikoro and Waibula District Fijian Schools in 1938.

The success of Fijians at rugby, tempered their enthusiasm for football and the physical nature of rugby appealed to them and gradually organised football amongst the Fijians died out.

In 1961, Fiji Football Association was formed which was a truly multiracial and national body. With this new status Fiji's football team participated in first South Pacific Games held in Suva in 1963. The opening up of football to all races saw teams like Ba immediately benefiting from the new arrangement. Football in Ba had long enjoyed support from the Fijian community and Ba soon had some good and famous Fijians playing in its team. Suva's multiracial population also provided early opportunity for people of other races to join the football competitions.

Football in Fiji was dominated by the Ba team in the sixties. In the sixties Ba won the inter-district football tournament five times, the last three in a row from 1966 to 1968. Ba also won the North-west football tournament and the Sugar Cup. In 1968, the Fiji Football Association adopted a two tier system where Ba, Labasa, Lautoka, Nadi, Rakiraki, Rewa, Sigatoka and Suva were placed in division A and Levuka, Tailevu-Naitasiri, Tailevu North, Savusavu, Taveuni and Navua were placed in division B. Division B competed for the Fiji Football Association Cup, won for the first time by Levuka. At the end of the season there were promotion-relegation matches. In 1969 the inter-district football tournament was held in Labasa for the first time and Nadi won the trophy for the first time.

In the 1970s, the association was able to convince town councils to build permanent seating structures and grounds for football and by the late nineties all A division teams, except two had such facilities. From 1976 pool play was introduced into the inter-district football tournament. Regular district level competitions were organised with the formation of the National League in 1977. The Battle of Giants tournament started in 1978. A Girmit Tournament was organised in 1979 to celebrate the centenary of the arrival of the Indians

In 1980, the Fiji Football Association acquired its own building, which is being used as an administration centre. For the first time since 1938, the inter-district football tournament was not held in 1987. This was due to uncertainties following the coup and restrictions on playing football on Sundays. 1988 was the golden jubilee year for the association as football in Fiji learnt to perform under the new post-coup conditions.

Football is now well established in Fiji with people of all races taking part. Facilities for players have been greatly improved and the Fiji national side regularly takes part in international tournaments.

== List of presidents ==
Year(s)	Name
1961–62	(Fiji) Abdul Lateef
1962–65	(Fiji) Manikam Pillai
1966–67	(Fiji) Abdul Lateef
1967–83	(Fiji) Manikam Pillai

Rajesh Patel, since 2006

== List of associate members ==
- Fiji Football Coaches Association
- Fiji Football Referees Association
- Fiji Gujerati Sports Association
- Fiji Muslim Sports Association
- Fiji Primary Schools Football Association
- Fiji Secondary Schools Football Association

== List of affiliated districts ==
- Ba Football Association
- Bua Soccer Association
- Dreketi Soccer Association
- Labasa Soccer Association
- Lami Soccer Association
- Lautoka Football Association
- Nadi Soccer Association
- Nadogo Soccer Association
- Nadroga Soccer Association
- Nasinu Football Association
- Navua Soccer Association
- Rakiraki Football Association
- Rewa Soccer Association
- Savusavu Soccer Association
- Seaqaqa Soccer Association
- Suva Soccer Association
- Tailevu/Naitasiri Football Association
- Tailevu North Soccer Association
- Taveuni Soccer Association
- Tavua Soccer Association

== Competitions ==
- Inter-district Championship
- National Soccer League
- Battle of the Giants
- Champion versus Champion
- Fiji Football Association Cup Tournament
- National Club Championship
- Girmit Soccer Tournament
- Talent Development League

== FIFA World Cup qualification zone (OFC) ==
- 1982 FIFA World Cup qualification (OFC)
- 1990 FIFA World Cup qualification (OFC)
- 1994 FIFA World Cup qualification (OFC)
- 1998 FIFA World Cup qualification (OFC)
- 2002 FIFA World Cup qualification (OFC)
- 2006 FIFA World Cup qualification (OFC)
- 2010 FIFA World Cup qualification (OFC)
- 2014 FIFA World Cup qualification (OFC)
- 2018 FIFA World Cup qualification (OFC)
- 2022 FIFA World Cup qualification (OFC)

== Bibliography ==
- M. Prasad, Sixty Years of Soccer in Fiji 1938–1998: The Official History of the Fiji Football Association, Fiji Football Association, Suva, 1998.
