= Suva F.C. =

Fijian football club

Suva Football Club
- Full name: Suva Football Club
- Nickname: Capital City Boys
- Founded: 1928; 98 years ago
- Ground: HFC Bank Stadium
- Capacity: 30,000
- President: Intiaz Khan
- Manager: Babs Khan
- League: Fiji Premier League
- 2025: FPL, 6th

Suva Football Club is a Fijian football club that competes in the Fiji Premier League, the top flight of Fijian football. The club is based in Suva. Their home stadium is HFC Bank Stadium.

== History ==
=== Early years ===
Suva Football Club was formed in 1905, made up of European employees of the Government and businesses. In 1910, a team from Suva played a match against a team from Nausori. Crew of visiting naval ships entertained themselves with friendly games with local teams. In 1910 a team from Suva played a game against HMS Powerful and won by 3:1. In 1914, a team from Suva played against HMS Torch, at Albert Park and won by 2:0. Suva Football Club participated in the Fijian football top-tier league, the 1977 Fiji National League.

== Notable former players ==
- (Ethiopia) Abdul Aman

== Achievements ==
- League Championship (for Districts): 4

1996, 1997, 2014, 2020.

- Inter-District Championship : 13

1940, 1945, 1946, 1948, 1951, 1952, 1954, 1956, 1960, 1981, 1983, 2012, 2014.
Runners-up: 2018, 2019.

- Battle of the Giants: 3

1982, 1988, 1995.

- Fiji Football Association Cup Tournament: 4

1995, 2012, 2020, 2022.

- Champion versus Champion Series: 0

== Ranking ==
=== World ===
As of 15 July 2023

Ranking	Team	Points
725	(Costa Rica) Guadalupe F.C.	169.32
726	(Paraguay) Club River Plate	169.07
727	(Fiji) Suva FC	168.98
728	(Bosnia and Herzegovina) FK Sarajevo	168.92
729	(Bulgaria) PFC Beroe Stara Zagora	168.74

=== OFC ===
As of 15 July 2023

Ranking	Team	Points
4	(French Polynesia) AS Pirae	172.14
5	(Solomon Islands) Solomon Warriors FC	171.35
6	(Fiji) Suva FC	168.98
7	(New Zealand) Eastern Suburbs AFC	155.90
8	(New Zealand) Wellington Phoenix FC	152.88

=== National ===
As of 15 July 2023

Ranking	Team	Points
1	(Fiji) Suva FC	168.98
2	(Fiji) Ba FC	100.96
3	(Fiji) Rewa FC	100.08
4	(Fiji) Lautoka FC	100.06
5	(Fiji) Labasa FC	81.18

== See also ==
- Fiji Football Association

== Bibliography ==
- M. Prasad, Sixty Years of Soccer in Fiji 1938–1998: The Official History of the Fiji Football Association, Fiji Football Association, Suva, 1998.
