= Nadi F.C. =

Fijian football club

Nadi D.F.A.
- Full name: Nadi D.F.A.
- Nickname: The Jetsetters
- Founded: 1937; 89 years ago
- Ground: Prince Charles Park; Nadi, Fiji
- Capacity: 18,000
- Chairman: Sameer Taki
- Manager: Asif Khan
- League: Fiji Premier League
- 2025: FPL, 9th

Nadi Football Club is a Fijian football club based in Nadi that competes in the Fiji Premier League. Their home stadium is Prince Charles.

== History ==
Nadi Football Club was founded in 1937 under the leadership of Edward Grant. The local competition held during the year included the teams: Koronubu, Sabeto, Bhartiya and Votualevu. Nadi played for the first time in the Inter-district competition in 1939, when it beat Nadroga in the preliminary round by 2 goals to nil but lost to Rewa in the semi-final by the same margin.

Nadi are 8-time champions of Fiji. Nadi won the Inter-District Championship (IDC) for the first time in 1969 under the Presidency of Cr. Shri Venkanna Chetty. They have won their last two IDC finals (against Lautoka 3–1 in 1998 and Ba 1–0 in 1999), which came after their last IDC win in 1974. Nadi qualified for the championship after a 3-team playoff with Ba and Labasa. Ba were favourites to win the play-offs but were upset in the first match against Labasa by 3–0. Nadi then beat Labasa by 3–0 and Ba 1–0 to qualify for the Oceania Club Championship.

== 1999 Oceania Club Championship ==
In the Championship, which they hosted, Nadi beat New Zealand's Central United 1–0 in the semi-finals courtesy of a Marika Namaqa free kick. Nadi, an amateur team, then lost the final to Australia's South Melbourne FC, a professional outfit, by 5–1. This match was played in heavy rain, with South Melbourne scoring 3 penalty kicks. Nadi's lone goal was scored by Watisoni Voli.

The next year in 2000, Nadi went undefeated in the National League by winning 17 of the 18 games and drawing one against Ba.

== Achievements ==
- League Championship (for Districts) : 9

1978, 1980, 1981, 1982, 1983, 1985, 1998, 2000, 2015.

- Inter-District Championship : 6

1969, 1971, 1974, 1998, 1999, 2002.

- Battle of the Giants : 5

1978, 1980, 1983, 1986, 1996.

- Fiji Football Association Cup Tournament : 5

1996, 2013, 2014, 2016, 2019.
Runner-up 1: 2017.

- Champion versus Champion: 1

2015.

== Performance in OFC competitions ==
- Oceania Club Championship (1 appearance)

1999 – Finalist – Lost against South Melbourne FC (Australia) (stage 3 of 3)

26 September 1999 15.30

South Melbourne FC (Australia)	5–1	(Fiji) Nadi
Steve Isoifidis 8'; David Clarkson 16'; Michael Curcija 47' pen Vaughan Coveny 50'; Steve Panopoulos 73' pen	(Report)	Watisoni Voli 87'

Prince Charles Park, Nadi, Fiji
Attendance: 10,000
Referee: ?

== Current squad ==
Note: Flags indicate national team as defined under FIFA eligibility rules; some limited exceptions apply. Players may hold more than one non-FIFA nationality.

No.	Pos.	Nation	Player
1	GK	FIJ	Samuela Tamanisau
2	MF	FIJ	Rahul Krishna
3	DF	FIJ	Luke Rawadamu
4	DF	FIJ	Sekove Naivakananumi
5	FW	FIJ	Rusiate Matarerega
6	MF	FIJ	Jone Ralulu
7	MF	FIJ	William Valentine
8	MF	FIJ	Christopher Kumar
9	FW	SOL	Jimson Abana
10	FW	FIJ	Joel Shelvin Prasad
11	DF	FIJ	Ilimotama Jese

No.	Pos.	Nation	Player
12	DF	FIJ	Ame Votoniu
13	MF	FIJ	Josevata Malakai
14	FW	FIJ	Surjason Sami
15	MF	FIJ	Peni Tuigulagula
16	DF	FIJ	Rupeni Rabici
17	MF	FIJ	Patrick Joseph
18	FW	VAN	Jack Tokaki
19	MF	FIJ	Sailosi Rayaqona
20	MF	FIJ	Christopher Kumar
21	GK	FIJ	Joela Biuvanua
22	MF	FIJ	Joeli Severo

== See also ==
- Fiji Football Association

== Bibliography ==
- M. Prasad (1998), Sixty Years of Soccer in Fiji 1938–1998: The Official History of the Fiji Football Association, Fiji Football Association, Suva.
