= Labasa F.C. =

Fijian football club

Labasa
- Full name: Labasa Football Club
- Nickname: Babasiga Lions
- Founded: 1938; 88 years ago
- Ground: Subrail Park; Labasa, Fiji
- Capacity: 10,000
- Chairman: Shaheen Hussain
- Manager: Alvin Chand
- League: National Football League (Fiji)
- 2025: FPL, 2nd
Home colours	Away colours

Labasa F.C., also known as Labasa FA, is a Fijian professional football club based in Labasa, that competes in the Fiji Premier League.

== History ==
A local football competition was held in Labasa from 1938. The competition included some ethnic Fijian Clubs. Labasa did not join the National Association when it was formed, in 1938, due to the distance of Labasa from the main island of Viti Levu, where all, except one, club was based.

In 1942, under the Presidency of Harold B. Gibson, a former member of the Legislative Council, Labasa Soccer Association joined the national football body, then known as the Fiji Indian Football Association.

Labasa remained at the periphery of football in Fiji, struggling to compete with teams from Viti Levu, until 1969, when it hosted the Inter-District Championship (IDC) for the first time. The team was runner-up in the IDC of 1972, 1973 and 1978. Labasa F.C. won the IDC for the first time in 1992 and again two years later in 1994.

In October 2011, the team won its third IDC tournament defeating Ba F.C. 1–0 at the TFL National Stadium in Suva. Labasa's winning goal in the final was scored by striker, Maciu Dunadamu in the second half of the match.

== Achievements ==
- League Championship (for districts): 2

Winner: 1991, 2007

- Inter-District Championship: 7

Winner: 1992, 1994, 2011, 2016, 2019, 2020, 2024
Runner-up: 1972, 1973, 1978

- Battle of the Giants: 4

Winner: 1997, 2019, 2022, 2023, 2025
Runner-up: 1986, 1993, 2000, 2002, 2008, 2012

- Fiji Football Association Cup Tournament: 5

Winner: 1992, 1997 (shared with Ba), 1999, 2015, 2025.
Runner-up: 1991, 1995, 2001, 2006, 2007, 2008, 2011, 2018

- Champion versus Champion: 5

Winner: 1992, 2007, 2017, 2019, 2020
Runner-up: 1994

- Girmit Cup: 1

Winner: 1979

== Youth squad ==
Note: Flags indicate national team as defined under FIFA eligibility rules; some limited exceptions apply. Players may hold more than one non-FIFA nationality.

No.	Pos.	Nation	Player
1	GK	FIJ	Kartik Sharma
9		FIJ	Mohammed RASASA
10	FW	FIJ	Sailimone Ravonokula
11		FIJ	Peni Misipopi
12		FIJ	Isacc SAHAYAM

No.	Pos.	Nation	Player
13		FIJ	Nemani Dolodai
16		FIJ	Aminisitai BULUI
18		FIJ	Melvin MANI
19		FIJ	Rohan NATH

== Personnel ==
=== Current technical staff ===
Position	Staff
Head coach	(Fiji) Alvin Chand
Assistant coach	(Fiji) Kasim Khan
Team manager	(Fiji) Ravinesh Chand
Youth team coach	(Fiji) Alvin Chand

=== Current women's staff ===
Position	Staff
Head coach	(Fiji) Roneel Ram

== See also ==
- Fiji Football Association
