= Rewa F.C. =

Fijian football club

Rewa
- Full name: Rewa Football Club
- Nickname: Delta Tigers
- Founded: 1928
- Ground: Foodcity Ratu Cakobau Park; Nausori, Fiji
- Capacity: 8,000
- Chairman: Nazeel Buksh
- Manager: Tevita waranaivalu
- League: National Football League (Fiji)
- 2025: Champions pattern_la1=
Home colours	Away colours

Rewa Football Club is a Fijian football club based in Nausori, playing in the National Football League. Rewa's home ground is Foodcity Ratu Cakobau Park. The club has won their first ever Fiji Premier League title in 2022.

== History ==
A league competition was organised in Rewa for the first time in 1928, although football was known to be played in the area since 1916. In 1928, two teams from Rewa, Dilkusha Excelsior Football Club and Rewa Football Club, took part in a competition organised by the Suva based Indian Reform League for the Vriddhi Cup. The other two teams were from Suva. Dilkusha won the trophy and repeated its success in 1929 and 1930. Having won the trophy three times in a row, Dilkusha was allowed to permanently keep the trophy and the competition came to end. From 1931 to 1936, Rewa United Football Club took part in the Fletcher Challenge Cup organised by the Indian Reform League of Suva. In 1937, the Rewa Indian Football Association was formed. The Rewa Association was one of the founding members of the Fiji Indian Football Association in 1938, which in 1961 became the Fiji Football Association.

Rewa won the first Inter-district competition (IDC) held in Suva in 1938, defeating Ba by 3 goals to 2 in the final. In June 1939, Rewa, as the IDC champions played against a team from the naval ship, H.M.S. Leath at the C.S.R. grounds in Nausori. Rewa won the game by a lone goal, watched by a thousand fans.

The Rewa Football Association consists of more than 42 clubs. The association won the Battle of Giants tournament in 2003 and 2004. The organization receives support from its fans.

Rewa qualified for the first time to 2017 OFC Champions League.

== Achievements ==
- League Championship (for Districts): 1
- Fiji National Football League: 3

2022, 2024, 2025

- Inter-District Championship : 10

1938, 1939, 1943, 1944, 1947, 1955, 1972, 2001, 2010, 2025

- Battle of the Giants: 9

1994, 2003, 2004, 2010, 2011, 2014, 2015, 2017, 2020

- Fiji Football Association Cup Tournament: 3

2011, 2017, 2018

- Champion versus Champion: 1

2010

- Fiji Games: 1

1994 (gold medalist)

== See also ==
- Fiji Football Association
