= 2008 OFC Nations Cup squads =

The following is a list of players used by each competing nation during the entirety of the 2008 OFC Nations Cup.

== New Caledonia ==
Coach: (France) Didier Chambaron

No.	Pos.	Player	Date of birth (age)	Caps	Goals	Club
	GK	Marc Ounemoa	27 January 1973 (aged 34)			(New Caledonian Football Federation) JS Baco
	GK	Jean-Yann Dounezek	20 November 1986 (aged 21)			(New Caledonian Football Federation) AS Magenta
	DF	Adolphe Boaoutho	9 February 1986 (aged 21)			(New Caledonian Football Federation) AS Témala Ouélisse
	DF	Benjamin Longue	3 December 1980 (aged 27)			(New Caledonian Football Federation) AS Magenta
	DF	André Sinédo	26 February 1978 (aged 29)			(New Caledonian Football Federation) AS Magenta
	DF	Jonathan Kakou	18 December 1989 (aged 18)			(New Caledonian Football Federation) AS Magenta
	DF	Jean-Patrick Wakanumuné	13 March 1980 (aged 27)			(New Caledonian Football Federation) AS Mont-Dore
	DF	Georges Wadrenges	1 April 1979 (aged 28)			(New Caledonian Football Federation) AS Mont-Dore
	DF	Michel Hmaé	21 March 1978 (aged 29)			(New Caledonian Football Federation) AS Magenta
	DF	Ramon Gjamaci	6 December 1975 (aged 32)			(Tahitian Football Federation) Manu-Ura
	DF	Ramon Djamali	12 June 1975 (aged 32)			(New Caledonian Football Federation) AS Mont-Dore
	MF	Fabien Saridjan	5 June 1980 (aged 27)			(New Caledonian Football Federation) JS Baco
	MF	Yohann Mercier	15 December 1980 (aged 27)			(New Caledonian Football Federation) JS Baco
	MF	Marius Bako	22 February 1985 (aged 22)			(New Caledonian Football Federation) AS Magenta
	MF	Robert Kaudré	14 June 1983 (aged 24)			(New Caledonian Football Federation) AS Mont-Dore
	MF	Patrick Diaike	25 May 1986 (aged 21)			(New Caledonian Football Federation) AS Mont-Dore
	MF	Allan Hnautra	31 March 1989 (aged 18)			(New Caledonian Football Federation) AS Lössi
	MF	Noël Kaudré	30 April 1981 (aged 26)			(New Caledonian Football Federation) AS Mont-Dore
	MF	Marius Mapou	22 June 1980 (aged 27)			(New Caledonian Football Federation) AS Mont-Dore
	MF	Olivier Dokunengo	4 September 1979 (aged 28)			(New Caledonian Football Federation) AS Mont-Dore
	MF	Poulidor Toto	16 May 1983 (aged 24)			(New Caledonian Football Federation) AS Magenta
	MF	Pierre Wajoka	19 December 1978 (aged 29)			(New Caledonian Football Federation) AS Magenta
	MF	Luther Wahnyamalla	27 February 1984 (aged 23)			(New Caledonian Football Federation) AS Lössi
	FW	Jean-Paul Wenessia	9 September 1979 (aged 28)			(New Caledonian Football Federation) AS Magenta
	FW	Mael Kaudre	30 June 1981 (aged 26)			(New Caledonian Football Federation) AS Magenta
	FW	Bertrand Kaï	6 June 1983 (aged 24)			(New Caledonian Football Federation) Hienghène Sport

== Fiji ==
Coach: (Uruguay) Juan Carlos Buzzetti

No.	Pos.	Player	Date of birth (age)	Caps	Goals	Club
	GK	Simione Tamanisau	5 June 1982 (aged 25)			(Fiji Football Association) Rewa F.C.
	GK	Beniamino Mateinaqara	19 August 1986 (aged 21)			(Fiji Football Association) Nadi F.C.
	GK	Filimoni Boletawa	15 December 1985 (aged 22)			(Fiji Football Association) Suva F.C.
	GK	Shamal Kumar	23 May 1979 (aged 28)			(Fiji Football Association) Labasa F.C.
	DF	Peni Finau	5 August 1981 (aged 26)			(New Zealand Football) YoungHeart Manawatu
	DF	Taniela Waqa	22 June 1983 (aged 24)			(Fiji Football Association) Lautoka F.C.
	DF	Malakai Kainihewe	28 July 1977 (aged 30)			(Fiji Football Association) Ba F.C.
	DF	Samuela Vula	22 August 1984 (aged 23)			(Fiji Football Association) Rewa F.C.
	DF	Alvin Singh	9 June 1988 (aged 19)			(Fiji Football Association) Ba F.C.
	DF	Avinesh Suwamy	6 April 1986 (aged 21)			(Fiji Football Association) Lautoka F.C.
	DF	Shalen Lal	3 July 1986 (aged 21)			(Fiji Football Association) Ba F.C.
	DF	Manueli Kalaou	22 June 1988 (aged 19)			(Fiji Football Association) Ba F.C.
	DF	Nayzal Ali	6 March 1985 (aged 22)			(Fiji Football Association) Navua F.C.
	DF	Valerio Nawatu	24 July 1984 (aged 23)			(Fiji Football Association) Navua F.C.
	DF	Samuela Kautoga	21 May 1987 (aged 20)			(Fiji Football Association) Labasa F.C.
	DF	Johnny Rao	6 September 1986 (aged 21)			(Fiji Football Association) Ba F.C.
	DF	Apisalome Tuvura	18 March 1986 (aged 21)			(Fiji Football Association) Nadi F.C.
	MF	Ronil Kumar	29 November 1984 (aged 23)			(New Zealand Football) Waitakere United
	MF	Salesh Kumar	28 July 1981 (aged 26)			(New Zealand Football) Auckland City FC
	MF	Pita Rabo	30 July 1977 (aged 30)			(New Zealand Football) Wairarapa United
	MF	Malakai Tiwa	3 October 1986 (aged 21)			(Fiji Football Association) Ba F.C.
	MF	Pene Erenio	20 January 1981 (aged 26)			(Fiji Football Association) Rewa F.C.
	MF	Rajnil Chand	1 December 1984 (aged 23)			(Fiji Football Association) Navua F.C.
	MF	Monit Chand	21 October 1985 (aged 22)			(Fiji Football Association) Navua F.C.
	MF	Pita Baleitoga	30 November 1984 (aged 23)			(Fiji Football Association) Labasa F.C.
	MF	Jone Vesikula	30 April 1986 (aged 21)			(Fiji Football Association) Ba F.C.
	FW	Tuimasi Manuca	14 May 1985 (aged 22)			(Fiji Football Association) Ba F.C.
	FW	Esava Naquleca	11 April 1982 (aged 25)			(Fiji Football Association) Navua F.C.
	FW	Maciu Dunadamu	14 June 1986 (aged 21)			(Fiji Football Association) Lautoka F.C.
	FW	Roy Krishna	20 August 1987 (aged 20)			(Fiji Football Association) Labasa F.C.
	FW	Lagi Dyer	16 April 1972 (aged 35)			(Fiji Football Association) Rewa F.C.
	FW	Osea Vakatalesau	15 January 1986 (aged 21)			(Fiji Football Association) Ba F.C.

== New Zealand ==
Coach: Ricki Herbert

No.	Pos.	Player	Date of birth (age)	Caps	Goals	Club
	GK	Jacob Spoonley	3 March 1987 (aged 20)			(New Zealand Football) Wellington Phoenix F.C.
	GK	Glen Moss	19 January 1983 (aged 24)			(New Zealand Football) Wellington Phoenix F.C.
	GK	James Bannatyne	30 June 1975 (aged 32)			(New Zealand Football) Team Wellington
	GK	Mark Paston	13 December 1976 (aged 31)			(New Zealand Football) Wellington Phoenix F.C.
	DF	James Pritchett	1 July 1982 (aged 25)			(New Zealand Football) Auckland City FC
	DF	Andrew Boyens	18 September 1983 (aged 24)			(Canadian Soccer Association) Toronto FC
	FW	Aaron Scott	18 July 1986 (aged 21)			(New Zealand Football) Waikato FC
	DF	Ben Sigmund	3 February 1981 (aged 26)			(New Zealand Football) Auckland City FC
	DF	Tony Lochhead	12 January 1982 (aged 25)			(New Zealand Football) Wellington Phoenix F.C.
	DF	Ivan Vicelich	3 September 1976 (aged 31)			(New Zealand Football) Auckland City
	DF	Ryan Nelsen	18 October 1977 (aged 30)			(The Football Association) Blackburn Rovers
	DF	David Mulligan	24 March 1982 (aged 25)			(New Zealand Football) Wellington Phoenix F.C.
	DF	Duncan Oughton	18 October 1977 (aged 30)			(United States Soccer Federation) Columbus Crew
	DF	Steven Old	17 February 1986 (aged 21)			(New Zealand Football) Wellington Phoenix F.C.
	MF	Jeremy Christie	22 May 1983 (aged 24)			(New Zealand Football) Wellington Phoenix F.C.
	MF	Andy Barron	24 December 1980 (aged 27)			(New Zealand Football) Team Wellington
	MF	Jeremy Brockie	7 October 1987 (aged 20)			(Football Australia) Sydney FC
	MF	Simon Elliott	10 June 1974 (aged 33)			(The Football Association) Fulham F.C.
	MF	Chris James	4 July 1987 (aged 20)			(The Football Association) Fulham F.C.
	MF	Tim Brown	6 March 1981 (aged 26)			(New Zealand Football) Wellington Phoenix F.C.
	MF	Jeff Campbell	25 August 1979 (aged 28)			(New Zealand Football) Auckland City FC
	MF	Cole Peverley	3 July 1988 (aged 19)			(New Zealand Football) Hawke's Bay United
	MF	Leo Bertos	20 December 1981 (aged 26)			(Football Australia) Perth Glory
	FW	Shane Smeltz	29 September 1981 (aged 26)			(New Zealand Football) Wellington Phoenix F.C.
	FW	Chris Killen	8 October 1981 (aged 26)			(Scottish Football Association) Celtic F.C.
	FW	Daniel Ellensohn	9 August 1985 (aged 22)			(New Zealand Football) Team Wellington
	FW	Allan Pearce	7 April 1983 (aged 24)			(New Zealand Football) Waitakere United
	FW	Jarrod Smith	20 June 1984 (aged 23)			(Canadian Soccer Association) Toronto FC
	FW	Greg Draper	13 August 1989 (aged 18)			(New Zealand Football) Wellington Phoenix F.C.
	FW	Costa Barbarouses	19 February 1990 (aged 17)			(New Zealand Football) Wellington Phoenix F.C.
	FW	Kris Bright	5 September 1986 (aged 21)			(Norwegian Football Federation) Kristiansund BK

== Vanuatu ==
Coach: (Vanuatu) Robert Calvo

No.	Pos.	Player	Date of birth (age)	Caps	Goals	Club
1	GK	David Chilia	10 June 1978 (aged 29)			(Vanuatu Football Federation) Tafea FC
20	GK	Chikau Mansale	13 January 1983 (aged 24)			(Football Australia) Logan United FC
	DF	Ken Masauvakalo	20 November 1984 (aged 23)			(Vanuatu Football Federation) Erakor Golden Star
	DF	Freddy Vava	25 November 1982 (aged 25)			(Vanuatu Football Federation) Tafea F.C.
	DF	Geoffrey Gete	3 August 1986 (aged 21)			(Vanuatu Football Federation) Tafea F.C.
	DF	Jacques Mafil Nawan	3 May 1983 (aged 24)			(Vanuatu Football Federation) Tafea F.C.
	DF	Andrew Chichirua	12 May 1986 (aged 21)			(Vanuatu Football Federation) Ifira Black Bird
	DF	Ephraim Kalorib	13 May 1970 (aged 37)			(Vanuatu Football Federation) Tafea F.C.
13	MF	François Sakama	12 December 1987 (aged 20)			(Vanuatu Football Federation) Tafea F.C.
9	MF	Jean Naprapol	20 July 1980 (aged 27)			(Vanuatu Football Federation) Tafea F.C.
19	MF	Derek Malas	13 December 1983 (aged 24)			(Vanuatu Football Federation) Erakor Golden Star
	MF	Pita David Maki	12 October 1982 (aged 25)			(Vanuatu Football Federation) Tafea F.C.
	MF	Alphonse Qorig	7 July 1981 (aged 26)			(Vanuatu Football Federation) Tafea F.C.
	MF	Hubert Nake	24 September 1979 (aged 28)			(Vanuatu Football Federation) Tafea F.C.
	MF	Jean Robert Yelou	25 September 1983 (aged 24)			(Vanuatu Football Federation) Amicale F.C.
11	FW	Etienne Mermer	26 January 1977 (aged 30)			(Tahitian Football Federation) A.S. Manu-Ura
15	FW	Jean Maleb	7 July 1986 (aged 21)			(New Zealand Football) Otago United
16	FW	Richard Iwai	15 May 1979 (aged 28)			(Football Australia) Mitchelton FC
	FW	Seule Soromon	14 August 1984 (aged 23)			(Fiji Football Association) Suva F.C.
	FW	Fenedy Masauvakalo	4 November 1984 (aged 23)			(Football Australia) Mitchelton FC
	FW	Moise Poida	2 April 1978 (aged 29)			(Vanuatu Football Federation) Tafea F.C.
