= List of Fiji international footballers =

The Fiji national football team represents the country of Fiji in international association football. It is fielded by Fiji Football Association, the governing body of football in Fiji, and competes as a member of the Oceania Football Confederation (OFC), which encompasses the countries of Oceania. Fiji played their first international match on 7 October 1951 in a 6–4 loss to New Zealand in Suva.

Fiji have competed in numerous competitions, and all players who have played in at least one international match, either as a member of the starting eleven or as a substitute, are listed below. Each player's details include his playing position while with the team, the number of caps earned and goals scored in all international matches, and details of the first and most recent matches played in. The names are initially ordered by number of caps (in descending order), then by date of debut, then by alphabetical order. All statistics are correct up to and including the match played on 30 September 2022.

== Key ==
Positions key
GK	Goalkeeper
DF	Defender
MF	Midfielder
FW	Forward

Position
Playing positions are listed according to the tactical formations that were employed at the time.
Caps and goals
Caps and goals comprise those in the FIFA World Cup and OFC Nations Cup, Melanesia Cup, their associated qualification matches, as well as Pacific Games, Pacific Mini Games matches and international friendly matches.

== Players ==
Fiji national team football players
Player	Pos.	Caps	Goals	Debut		Last or most recent match		Ref.
Player	Pos.	Caps	Goals	Date	Opponent	Date	Opponent	Ref.
Roy Krishna	FW	61	44	25 August 2007	Tuvalu	17 November 2024	New Caledonia	
Simione Tamanisau	GK	39	0	30 June 2003	Vanuatu	15 July 2019	Tuvalu	
Taniela Waqa	DF	37	4	1 July 2003	Tuvalu	28 March 2017	New Zealand	
Malakai Kainihewe	DF	36	5	11 April 2001	Samoa	9 September 2011	Solomon Islands	
Remueru Tekiate	DF	35	2	2 June 2012	New Zealand	30 September 2022	Solomon Islands	
Esala Masi	FW	34	31	7 June 1997	New Zealand	14 August 2005	India	
Setareki Hughes	DF	31	1	28 May 2016	New Zealand	30 September 2022	Solomon Islands	
Emosi Baleinuku	DF	27	3	7 June 1997	New Zealand	4 June 2004	Solomon Islands	
Lorima Dau	DF	27	1	6 July 2002	New Caledonia	2 June 2004	Australia	
Dave Radrigai	MF	25	2	19 August 2015	Tonga	20 July 2019	Papua New Guinea	
Seveci Rokotakala	MF	24	5	10 July 2002	Australia	9 September 2011	Tahiti	
Beniamino Mateinaqara	GK	23	0	25 August 2007	Tuvalu	20 July 2019	Papua New Guinea	
Christopher Wasasala	FW	23	0	25 May 2017	Solomon Islands	30 September 2022	Solomon Islands	
Salesh Kumar	MF	22	3	30 September 1998	Cook Islands	19 November 2008	New Zealand	
Thomas Vulivuli	MF	22	2	19 May 2004	Vanuatu	7 September 2007	New Caledonia	
Laisenia Raura	MF	22	0	10 November 2015	Vanuatu	18 July 2019	Solomon Islands	
Alvin Avinesh	MF	21	3	12 May 2004	Papua New Guinea	6 June 2012	Papua New Guinea	
Alvin Singh	DF	21	1	6 September 2008	Vanuatu	26 June 2016	Malaysia	
Kavaia Rawaqa	DF	21	0	25 March 2017	New Zealand	20 July 2019	Papua New Guinea	
Pita Baleitoga	MF	20	4	17 November 2007	New Caledonia	4 June 2012	Vanuatu	
Avinesh Suwamy	MF	19	3	12 August 2005	India	28 March 2017	New Zealand	
Osea Vakatalesau	FW	19	14	12 August 2005	India	28 March 2017	New Zealand	
Malakai Tiwa	MF	19	7	25 August 2007	Tuvalu	28 May 2016	New Zealand	
Pita Rabo	FW	18	5	30 September 1998	Cook Islands	21 November 2007	New Caledonia	
Kolinio Sivoki	DF	18	1	27 August 2015	American Samoa	24 March 2019	Mauritius	
Rusiate Matarerega	FW	18	4	31 May 2016	Solomon Islands	20 July 2019	Papua New Guinea	
Kishan Sami	DF	17	1	22 March 2018	Philippines	28 March 2022	Vanuatu	
Patrick Joseph	MF	17	5	18 March 2019	New Caledonia	30 September 2022	Solomon Islands	
Viliame Toma	DF	16	0	7 April 2001	American Samoa	3 September 2007	New Caledonia	
Pene Erenio	MF	16	0	15 May 2004	American Samoa	9 September 2011	Tahiti	
Samuela Kautoga	DF	16	1	17 November 2007	New Caledonia	11 June 2017	New Caledonia	
Manoa Masi	MF	15	5	25 September 1998	Australia	11 July 2003	New Caledonia	
Veresa Toma	MF	15	10	6 July 2002	New Caledonia	13 July 2011	Vanuatu	
Maciu Dunadamu	FW	15	7	17 October 2007	New Zealand	7 November 2015	Vanuatu	
Tevita Waranaivalu	MF	15	2	19 August 2015	Tonga	30 September 2022	Solomon Islands	
Ame Votoniu	DF	15	1	19 November 2017	Estonia	20 July 2019	Papua New Guinea	
Zibraaz Sahib	MF	14	0	19 August 2015	Tonga	15 July 2019	Tuvalu	
Ravuama Madigi	FW	13	6	14 November 1988	New Zealand	21 June 1997	Papua New Guinea	
Valerio Nasema	DF	13	3	15 June 1997	Papua New Guinea	10 July 2002	Australia	
Laisiasa Gataurua	MF	13	5	30 June 2003	Vanuatu	6 June 2004	New Zealand	
Jone Vesikula	DF	13	0	2 June 2004	Australia	25 March 2017	New Zealand	
Esava Naqeleca	DF	13	1	17 November 2007	New Caledonia	9 September 2011	Tahiti	
Laitia Tuilau	MF	13	0	19 November 2008	New Zealand	15 December 2017	New Caledonia	
Epeli Saukuru	FW	13	2	25 March 2017	New Zealand	22 March 2018	Philippines	
Ronil Kumar	MF	12	4	25 August 2007	Tuvalu	10 September 2008	Vanuatu	
Samuela Drudru	FW	12	4	19 August 2015	Tonga	18 July 2019	Solomon Islands	
Saula Waqa	FW	12	4	25 May 2017	Solomon Islands	30 September 2022	Solomon Islands	
Abraham Watkins	DF	11	2	17 September 1986	New Zealand	28 July 1992	New Caledonia	
Lote Delai	MF	10	4	11 March 1987	Solomon Islands	26 September 1992	Vanuatu	
Radike Nawalu	FW	10	11	11 November 1988	New Zealand	26 September 1992	Vanuatu	
Samuela Vula	DF	10	0	27 August 2007	Cook Islands	6 June 2012	Papua New Guinea	
Amani Makoe	DF	10	0	19 August 2015	Tonga	19 November 2017	Estonia	
Antonio Tuivuna	DF	10	1	7 November 2015	Vanuatu	28 March 2022	Vanuatu	
Iosefo Verefou	FW	10	0	7 November 2015	Vanuatu	2 September 2017	Indonesia	
Laisena Tuba	GK	9	0	30 September 1998	Cook Islands	4 June 2004	Solomon Islands	
Josaia Bukalidi	FW	9	2	7 April 2001	American Samoa	27 August 2007	Cook Islands	
Waisake Sabutu	FW	9	3	30 June 2003	Vanuatu	1 September 2007	Tahiti	
Ilisoni Logaivau	MF	9	0	2 June 2012	New Zealand	5 July 2018	Malaysia	
Nicholas Prasad	DF	9	0	18 March 2019	New Caledonia	20 July 2019	Papua New Guinea	
Shivam Naidu	MF	9	0	10 March 2022	Vanuatu	30 September 2022	Solomon Islands	
Ashnil Raju	MF	9	0	10 March 2022	Vanuatu	30 September 2022	Solomon Islands	
Ulaiasi Mateiwai	MF	8	3	25 September 1998	Australia	16 April 2001	Tonga	
Jope Lomu	MF	8	3	12 September 1991	Guam	18 June 1997	New Zealand	
Shailemdra Lal	FW	8	7	25 September 1998	Australia	16 April 2001	Tonga	
Peni Finau	DF	8	1	25 August 2007	Tuvalu	19 November 2008	New Zealand	
Ilimotama Jese	DF	8	0	19 August 2015	Tonga	26 June 2016	Malaysia	
Napolioni Qasevakatini	FW	8	4	19 August 2015	Tonga	15 December 2017	New Caledonia	
Sitiveni Cavuilagi	MF	8	0	28 May 2017	Solomon Islands	30 September 2022	Solomon Islands	
Simon Peters	FW	7	0	17 September 1986	New Zealand	3 December 1988	Australia	
Meli Vuilabasa	MF	7	2	17 September 1986	New Zealand	3 December 1988	Australia	
Alivate Driu	FW	7	3	7 June 1997	New Zealand	15 April 2000	Solomon Islands	
Marika Namaqa	DF	7	1	25 September 1998	Australia	16 April 2001	Tonga	
Narendra Rao	MF	7	0	2 September 2017	Indonesia	11 September 2018	Singapore	
Savenaca Baledrokadroka	DF	7	0	5 July 2018	Malaysia	20 July 2019	Papua New Guinea	
Malakai Rakula	MF	7	0	18 March 2019	New Caledonia	15 July 2019	Tuvalu	
Epeli Rokoqica	DF	6	0	17 September 1986	New Zealand	26 September 1992	Vanuatu	
Kameli Kilaiwaca	FW	6	1	7 June 1997	New Zealand	2 October 1998	New Zealand	
Isikeli Sevanaia	GK	6	1	7 June 1997	New Zealand	14 April 2001	Australia	
Jope Namawa	DF	6	1	7 April 2001	American Samoa	8 July 2002	Vanuatu	
Luke Vidovi	MF	6	1	1 July 2003	Tuvalu	14 August 2005	India	
Tuimasi Manuca	FW	6	1	6 September 2008	Vanuatu	5 September 2011	Papua New Guinea	
Nasoni Buli	GK	5	0	14 November 1988	New Zealand	3 December 1988	Australia	
Pita Dau	DF	5	0	14 November 1988	New Zealand	3 December 1988	Australia	
Ivor Evans	MF	5	0	14 November 1988	New Zealand	3 December 1988	Australia	
Maretino Nemani	DF	5	0	14 November 1988	New Zealand	7 June 1992	New Zealand	
Vimal Sami	MF	5	2	14 November 1988	New Zealand	3 December 1988	Australia	
Jone Watisoni	FW	5	0	14 November 1988	New Zealand	20 September 1991	Solomon Islands	
Sailesh Sami Bula	FW	5	5	5 February 2001	Malaysia	8 July 2002	Vanuatu	
Peni Pononi	FW	5	0	30 June 2003	Vanuatu	11 July 2003	New Caledonia	
Abbu Zahid	FW	5	1	19 August 2015	Tonga	11 September 2018	Singapore	
Tito Vodowaqa	FW	5	0	18 March 2019	New Caledonia	20 July 2019	Papua New Guinea	
Mohammed Alam	GK	5	0	10 March 2022	Vanuatu	28 March 2022	Vanuatu	
Sairusi Nalaubu	FW	5	0	10 March 2022	Vanuatu	28 March 2022	Vanuatu	
Rahul Naresh	MF	5	0	10 March 2022	Vanuatu	28 March 2022	Vanuatu	
Akuila Mateisuva	GK	5	0	24 March 2022	Papua New Guinea	30 September 2022	Solomon Islands	
Dan Lutumailagi	DF	4	0	17 November 1988	New Zealand	3 December 1988	Australia	
Tatto Bula	MF	4	4	14 September 1991	Tahiti	30 July 1992	Vanuatu	
Yusuf Ismail	MF	4	0	7 June 1992	New Zealand	26 September 1992	Vanuatu	
Ratu Masilagi	FW	4	0	25 July 1992	Solomon Islands	26 September 1992	Vanuatu	
Liuai Duguga	FW	4	1	7 June 1997	New Zealand	21 June 1997	Papua New Guinea	
Romulo Kaibau	DF	4	0	7 June 1997	New Zealand	21 June 1997	Papua New Guinea	
Usemio Logaivau	DF	4	0	7 June 1997	New Zealand	21 June 1997	Papua New Guinea	
Ulaiasi Seruvatu	MF	4	0	7 June 1997	New Zealand	21 June 1997	Papua New Guinea	
Ramen Sharma	MF	4	0	7 June 1997	New Zealand	21 June 1997	Papua New Guinea	
Ratu Debalevu	MF	4	0	25 September 1998	Australia	4 October 1998	Tahiti	
Luke Nabro	DF	4	0	25 September 1998	Australia	4 October 1998	Tahiti	
Maika Waqa	DF	4	0	30 September 1998	Cook Islands	15 May 2004	American Samoa	
Keni Doidoi	MF	4	0	8 April 2000	Papua New Guinea	10 July 2002	Australia	
Shamal Kumar	GK	4	0	7 April 2001	American Samoa	17 November 2007	New Caledonia	
Ratu Roluvenisoba	MF	4	0	7 April 2001	American Samoa	16 April 2001	Tonga	
Leone Vurukania	FW	4	2	7 April 2001	American Samoa	16 April 2001	Tonga	
Lagi Dyer	FW	4	0	15 May 2004	American Samoa	10 September 2008	Vanuatu	
Apisalome Tuvura	DF	4	0	12 August 2005	India	21 November 2007	New Caledonia	
Peniame Drova	DF	4	0	13 July 2011	Vanuatu	28 March 2017	New Zealand	
Jale Dreloa	DF	4	0	19 August 2015	Tonga	11 October 2015	Vanuatu	
Tevita Koroi	GK	4	0	27 August 2015	American Samoa	11 June 2017	New Caledonia	
Samuela Nabenia	FW	4	0	31 May 2016	Solomon Islands	19 November 2017	Estonia	
Peni Tuigulagula	MF	4	0	18 March 2019	New Caledonia	15 July 2019	Tuvalu	
Lekima Gonerau	DF	4	0	10 March 2022	Vanuatu	24 March 2022	Papua New Guinea	
Simione Nabenu	DF	4	0	17 September 2022	New Caledonia	30 September 2022	Solomon Islands	
Praneel Naidu	DF	4	0	17 September 2022	New Caledonia	30 September 2022	Solomon Islands	
Shafiq Ali		3	0	14 November 1988	New Zealand	3 December 1988	Australia	
Abdul Mannan	FW	3	0	7 June 1992	New Zealand	19 September 1992	New Zealand	
Iosefo Visabotu	GK	3	0	7 June 1992	New Zealand	26 September 1992	Vanuatu	
Bakalevu Moceimarika	FW	3	3	12 September 1992	Vanuatu	26 September 1992	Vanuatu	
Lorima Batirerega	MF	3	2	7 June 1997	New Zealand	11 April 2000	Vanuatu	
Waisea Nabenu	FW	3	0	25 September 1998	Australia	4 October 1998	Tahiti	
Nabil Begg	MF	3	0	10 March 2002	Vanuatu	28 March 2002	Vanuatu	
Nikola Raoma	DF	3	0	12 May 2004	Papua New Guinea	19 May 2004	Vanuatu	
Archie Watkins	DF	3	0	15 July 2011	Vanuatu	7 September 2011	Solomon Islands	
Ratu Vatucicila	DF	3	0	25 August 2007	Tuvalu	3 September 2007	New Caledonia	
Paulo Posiano	DF	3	0	3 July 2011	Vanuatu	4 June 2012	Solomon Islands	
Anish Khem	MF	3	0	26 June 2016	Malaysia	28 March 2002	Vanuatu	
Waisake Tabucava	MF	3	0	28 May 2017	Solomon Islands	11 June 2017	New Caledonia	
Epeli Lairoti	DF	3	0	2 September 2017	Indonesia	5 July 2018	Malaysia	
Paulo Buke	FW	3	0	5 July 2018	Malaysia	11 September 2018	Singapore	
Misiwani Nairube	GK	3	0	5 July 2018	Malaysia	11 September 2018	Singapore	
Isikeli Ratucava	MF	3	0	7 June 2019	Tahiti	15 July 2019	Tuvalu	
Afraz Ali	DF	3	0	10 March 2022	Vanuatu	17 September 2022	New Caledonia	
Inoke Turagalailai	DF	3	0	24 March 2022	Papua New Guinea	17 September 2022	New Caledonia	
Choy Upendran	DF	2	0	17 September 1986	New Zealand	19 September 1986	New Zealand	
R. Waqa		2	0	17 September 1986	New Zealand	19 September 1986	New Zealand	
Savenaca Waqa	GK	2	0	17 September 1986	New Zealand	19 September 1986	New Zealand	
Sam Work	FW	2	0	17 September 1986	New Zealand	19 September 1986	New Zealand	
Keverieli Salesi	DF	2	0	14 November 1988	New Zealand	17 September 1991	New Zealand	
Ratu Matanitobua		2	0	19 November 1988	New Zealand	14 September 1991	Tahiti	
Kini Tubi	DF	2	0	20 September 1991	Solomon Islands	26 September 1992	Vanuatu	
Sami Bimal	DF	2	0	7 June 1992	New Zealand	19 September 1992	New Zealand	
Suli Matanitabua	MF	2	0	7 June 1992	New Zealand	19 September 1992	New Zealand	
Viliame Batidegei	FW	2	0	12 September 1992	Vanuatu	26 September 1992	Vanuatu	
Kaliova Bulinaceva	MF	2	1	12 September 1992	Vanuatu	26 September 1992	Vanuatu	
Bogid Kiniconi	DF	2	0	12 September 1992	Vanuatu	19 September 1992	New Zealand	
Elia Lawakeli	DF	2	0	12 September 1992	Vanuatu	26 September 1992	Vanuatu	
Solome Pita	MF	2	1	7 June 1997	New Zealand	15 June 1997	Papua New Guinea	
Vishwa Nair	MF	2	0	15 June 1997	Papua New Guinea	21 June 1997	Papua New Guinea	
Sekove Duanatama	DF	2	0	18 June 1997	New Zealand	21 June 1997	Papua New Guinea	
Intiaz Khan	DF	2	0	30 September 1998	Cook Islands	4 October 1998	Tahiti	
Stewart Bola	MF	2	0	8 July 2002	Vanuatu	10 July 2002	Australia	
Harris Bali	DF	2	0	1 July 2003	Tuvalu	5 July 2003	Kiribati	
Ronald Ram	MF	2	0	1 July 2003	Tuvalu	5 July 2003	Kiribati	
Marika Rodu	DF	2	0	1 July 2003	Tuvalu	5 July 2003	Kiribati	
Stephen Morrel	MF	2	0	15 May 2004	American Samoa	14 August 2005	India	
Petero Daunisaka	MF	2	0	12 August 2005	India	14 August 2005	India	
Kiniviliame Naika	MF	2	0	12 August 2005	India	14 August 2005	India	
Valerio Nawatu	FW	2	1	17 November 2007	New Caledonia	21 November 2007	New Caledonia	
Rajnil Chand	MF	2	0	6 September 2008	Vanuatu	10 September 2008	Vanuatu	
Eran Underwood	FW	2	0	13 July 2011	Vanuatu	15 July 2011	Vanuatu	
Alefereti Dickson	GK	2	0	19 August 2015	Tonga	27 August 2015	American Samoa	
Taione Kerevanua	MF	2	0	19 August 2015	Tonga	27 August 2015	American Samoa	
Nickel Chand	MF	2	0	28 May 2016	New Zealand	31 May 2016	Solomon Islands	
Meli Codro	MF	2	0	26 June 2016	Malaysia	24 March 2019	Mauritius	
Ratu Nakalevu	MF	2	0	26 June 2016	Malaysia	22 March 2018	Philippines	
Rinal Prasad	MF	2	0	25 March 2017	New Zealand	28 March 2017	New Zealand	
Madhwan Goundar	MF	2	0	25 May 2017	Solomon Islands	28 May 2017	Solomon Islands	
Vuniuci Tikomaimereke	DF	2	0	25 May 2017	Solomon Islands	12 December 2017	Tonga	
Epeli Loaniceva	GK	2	0	19 November 2017	Estonia	22 March 2018	Philippines	
Rupeni Rabici	DF	2	0	19 November 2017	Estonia	2 December 2017	Tuvalu	
Altaaf Sahib	FW	2	0	2 December 2017	Tuvalu	12 December 2017	Tonga	
Filipe Baravilala	DF	2	0	22 March 2018	Philippines	5 July 2018	Malaysia	
Edward Aaron	DF	2	0	10 March 2022	Vanuatu	24 March 2022	Papua New Guinea	
Sitiveni Rakai	DF	2	0	24 September 2022	Solomon Islands	30 September 2022	Solomon Islands	
Epeli Ragavatu	MF	1	0	17 September 1986	New Zealand	17 September 1986	New Zealand	
Mohamed Saleem	FW	1	0	19 September 1986	New Zealand	19 September 1986	New Zealand	
D. Shaheem		1	0	19 September 1986	New Zealand	19 September 1986	New Zealand	
Akuila Rova	FW	1	2	12 September 1991	Guam	12 September 1991	Guam	
Epeli Levaci	FW	1	0	7 June 1992	New Zealand	7 June 1992	New Zealand	
Napoleon Rokatagi	GK	1	0	12 September 1992	Vanuatu	12 September 1992	Vanuatu	
Meli Cabesiro		1	0	26 September 1992	Vanuatu	26 September 1992	Vanuatu	
Mosese Jese		1	0	16 December 1993	Tahiti	16 December 1993	Tahiti	
Ratu Korotagi	GK	1	0	21 June 1997	Papua New Guinea	21 June 1997	Papua New Guinea	
Masi Natasiwai	DF	1	0	4 October 1998	Tahiti	4 October 1998	Tahiti	
Atunesh Prasad	MF	1	2	11 April 2001	Samoa	11 April 2001	Samoa	
Thomas Esaeli	MF	1	0	16 April 2001	Tonga	16 April 2001	Tonga	
Maika Levula	MF	1	0	16 April 2001	Tonga	16 April 2001	Tonga	
Meli Delai	DF	1	0	10 July 2002	Australia	10 July 2002	Australia	
Luke Tavuyara	GK	1	0	10 July 2002	Australia	10 July 2002	Australia	
Ratu Baledrokadroka	GK	1	0	5 July 2003	Kiribati	5 July 2003	Kiribati	
Nayzal Ali	DF	1	0	21 November 2007	New Caledonia	21 November 2007	New Caledonia	
Manueli Kalou	DF	1	0	10 September 2008	Vanuatu	10 September 2008	Vanuatu	
Jone Vonu	MF	1	0	19 November 2008	New Zealand	19 November 2008	New Zealand	
Kamal Hassan	FW	1	0	15 July 2011	Vanuatu	15 July 2011	Vanuatu	
Joseph Mishra	FW	1	0	15 July 2011	Vanuatu	15 July 2011	Vanuatu	
Misaele Draunibaka	FW	1	0	6 June 2012	Papua New Guinea	6 June 2012	Papua New Guinea	
Apisai Smith	MF	1	0	6 June 2012	Papua New Guinea	6 June 2012	Papua New Guinea	
James Hoyt	MF	1	0	25 March 2017	New Zealand	25 March 2017	New Zealand	
Manav Permal	FW	1	0	25 May 2017	Solomon Islands	25 May 2017	Solomon Islands	
Ravnesh Singh	FW	1	0	25 May 2017	Solomon Islands	25 May 2017	Solomon Islands	
Jonetani Buksh	MF	1	0	2 September 2017	Indonesia	2 September 2017	Indonesia	
Ratu Dau	FW	1	0	5 July 2018	Malaysia	5 July 2018	Malaysia	
Mitieli Namuka	MF	1	0	5 July 2018	Malaysia	5 July 2018	Malaysia	
Scott Wara	DF	1	0	5 September 2018	Solomon Islands	5 September 2018	Solomon Islands	
William Valentine	MF	1	0	10 June 2019	Vanuatu	10 June 2019	Vanuatu	
Josateki Tamudu	DF	1	0	18 March 2019	New Caledonia	18 March 2019	New Caledonia	
Isikeli Sevanaia	GK	1	0	10 March 2022	Vanuatu	10 March 2022	Vanuatu	
