= 2014 Fiji National Football League =

- Season: 2014
- Champions: Suva FC (3rd title)
- Relegated: Navua FC
- Top goalscorer: Samuela Drudru (4); Rusiate Matarerega (4); Pita Bolatoga (4)
- Biggest away win: Nadroga FC 0-6 Ba FC
- Highest scoring: Lautoka FC 2-6 Ba FC
- All statistics correct as of 28 June 2019.

The 2014 Fiji National Football League was the 38th season of the Fiji Premier League administered by the Fiji Football Association (FFA) since its establishment in 1977. The home and away season began on 18 January 2013, and the final was on 17 May 2014. Ba FC and Nadi FC represented the Fiji National Football League in the 2013–14 OFC Champions League after finishing as Champions and Runners-up respectively in the 2013 Fiji National Football League competition.

Suva FC won the league title.

== Clubs ==
Team	Location	Stadium	Capacity	Manager	Captain	Kit manufacturer	Shirt sponsor
Ba FC	Ba	Govind Park	13,500	(Fiji) Yogendra Dutt		Kappa	Digicel
Labasa FC	Labasa	Subrail Park	10,000	(Fiji) Pita Bolaitoga			
Lautoka FC	Lautoka	Churchill Park	25,000	(Fiji) Ravinesh Kumar			
Nadi FC	Nadi	Prince Charles Park	18,000	(Fiji) Kamal Swamy			
Nadroga F.C.	Sigatoka	Lawaqa Park	12,000	(Fiji) Waisea Tale			
Navua FC	Navua	Thomson Park	1,000	(Fiji) Ramesh Chandra			
Rewa FC	Nausori	Ratu Cakobau Park	8,000	(Fiji) Jeff Friendship			
Suva FC	Suva	ANZ Stadium	30,000	(Fiji) Gurjit Singh			

== Standings ==
Pos	Team	Pld	W	D	L	GF	GA	GD	Pts	Qualification or relegation
1	Suva FC (C)	14	11	1	2	25	11	+14	34	2014–15 OFC Champions League group stage
2	Ba FC	14	8	2	4	33	13	+20	26	2014–15 OFC Champions League group stage
3	Nadi FC	14	8	2	4	17	13	+4	26	
4	Labasa FC	14	7	3	4	26	16	+10	24	
5	Rewa FC	14	6	3	5	14	13	+1	21	
6	Nadroga F.C.	14	4	1	9	15	22	−7	13	
7	Lautoka FC	14	2	4	8	10	31	−21	10	
8	Navua FC (R)	14	1	2	11	10	31	−21	5	Relegation to the 2015 Fiji Senior League

Updated to match(es) played on 21 September 2014. Source:
Rules for classification: 1) points; 2) goal difference; 3) number of goals scored.
(C) Champions; (R) Relegated

== 2014 Pillay’s Garments Champion vs Champion ==
=== Details ===
11 January 2014
16:00 BST

Nadi (Fiji)	1–1	(Fiji) Ba
Matarerega 52'	Report	Shaheed 89'

Prince Charles Park, Nadi
Referee: Dina Mani (Fiji)

Nadi	Ba

== Regular season ==
=== Round 1 ===
Saturday, 18 January 2014

3:00pm	Suva FC	2–1	Labasa FC	ANZ Stadium, Suva
	Samuela Drudru 10'; Nikhil Chand 75'		Joseph Mishra 17'	Attendance: 20,000

Sunday, 18 January 2014

3:00pm	Navua FC	1–2	Rewa FC	Ratu Cakobau Park, Nausori
	Jesoni Takala 88'		Iosefo Verevou 30'; Apisai Smith 55'

3:00pm	Nadroga F.C.	2–1	Lautoka FC	Lawaqa Park, Sigatoka
	Peni Finau 9'; Shivan Kumar 82'		Laisari Qalica 56'

=== Round 2 ===
Saturday, 25 January 2014

1:30pm	Labasa FC	3–1	Nadroga F.C.	Subrail Park, Labasa
	Joseph Mishra 18'; Pita Bolatoga 20', 25'	Report	Watisoni Kamoka 67'

7:00pm	Rewa FC	3–2	Lautoka FC	Ratu Cakobau Park, Nausori
	Iosefo Verevou 48', 62'; Kelepi Qaqa 87'	Report	Poasa Bainivalu (o.g.); Dave Radrigai 32'

Sunday, 26 January 2014

3:00pm	Suva FC	3–1	Navua FC	ANZ Stadium, Suva
	Samuela Drudru 4'; Sahil Dave 45'; Nikhil Chand 80'	Report	Jale Dreola (o.g.)

=== Round 3 ===
Saturday, 1 February 2013

3:00pm	Ba FC	1–0	Navua FC	Govind Park, Ba
	Ronil Kumar 78'	Report

3:00pm	Nadi FC	2–0	Nadroga F.C.	Prince Charles Park, Nadi
	Amani Makoe 20'; Rusiate Matarerega 40'	Report

Sunday, 2 February 2013

3:00pm	Suva FC	1–0	Rewa FC	ANZ Stadium, Suva
	Samuela Drudru 29'

3:00pm	Lautoka FC	1–2	Labasa FC	Churchill Park, Lautoka
	Alvin Avinesh 40'		Pita Bolatoga 8', 57'

=== Round 4 ===
Sunday, 9 February 2014

3:00pm	Nadroga F.C.	0–6	Ba FC	Lawaqa Park, Sigatoka
			Abbu Zahid Shaheed 30'; Saula Waqa 50'; Avinesh Waran Swamy 60'; Ronil Kumar 70'; Meli Codro 80'; Jone Vesikula 90'

3:00pm	Lautoka FC	0–2	Suva FC	Churchill Park, Lautoka
		Report	Ravinesh Singh 42'; Samuela Drudru 62'

3:00pm	Nadi FC	3–1	Navua FC	Prince Charles Park, Nadi
	Rusiate Matarerega 24', 34'; Lekima Gonerau 51'	Report	Vineet Chand 87'

=== Round 5 ===
Sunday, 16 February 2014

3:00pm	Labasa FC	0–1	Nadi FC	Lawaqa Park, Sigatoka
			Rusiate Matarerega 56'

3:00pm	Ba FC	0–0	Rewa FC	Churchill Park, Lautoka

7:00 pm	Suva FC	1–0	Nadroga F.C.	Prince Charles Park, Nadi
	Samuela Drudru 45'

=== Round 6 ===
Saturday, 22 February 2013

3:00pm	Nadi FC	0–1	Suva FC	Govind Park, Ba
			Waisake Navunigasau 41'

3:00pm	Rewa FC	0–1	Labasa FC	Prince Charles Park, Nadi
			Apisolome Turuva 39'

Sunday, 23 February 2013

3:00pm	Nadroga F.C.	1–2	Navua FC	ANZ Stadium, Suva
	Tomasi Tuicakau 86'		Vineet Chand 30', 92'

3:00pm	Lautoka FC	2–6	Ba FC	Churchill Park, Lautoka
	Alvin Avinesh 25'; Isikeli Jeke Keli 52'		Osea Vakatalesau 11', 68'; Jone Vesikula 41'; Ronil Kumar 48'; Avinesh Waran Suwamy 77'; Abbu Zahid Shaheed 90'

=== Round 7 ===
Sunday, 9 March 2014

3:00pm	Navua FC	0–2	Lautoka FC	Govind Park, Ba
			Alvin Avinesh 46', 88'

3:00pm	Rewa FC	0–1	Nadi FC	Prince Charles Park, Nadi
		Report	Jone Salauneune 88'

=== Round 8 ===
Sunday, 16 March 2014

3:00 pm	Nadroga F.C.	1–1	Rewa FC	Lawaqa Park, Sigatoka
	Joseph Elder 5'	Report	Iosefo Verevou 26'

3:00pm	Navua FC	1–5	Labasa FC	Thomson Park, Navua
	Kushal Naicker (o.g.)	Report	Kushal Naicker 10'; Joseph Mishra 52', 62'; Inia Boko (o.g.); Ilisoni Logaivou 82'

=== Round 9 ===
Saturday, 1 June 2014

3:00 pm

Ba FC	3–0	Nadi FC
Jone Vesikula 50'; Avinesh Suwamy 62'; Maciu Dunadumu 69'

Lawaqa Park, Sigatoka

=== Round 10 ===
Sunday, 16 March 2014	Ba FC	3–2	Labasa	Lawaqa Park, Sigatoka
3:00 pm	Avinesh Suwamy 34'; Maciu Dunadamu 42'; Abbu Zahid Shaheed (o.g.)		Apisalome Turuva 47'; Sandeep Nair 88'

=== Top scorers ===
Rank	Player	Club	Goals
1	(Fiji) Samuela Drudru	Suva FC	4
1	(Fiji) Rusiate Matarerega	Nadi FC	4
1	(Fiji) Pita Bolatoga	Labasa FC	4
4	(Fiji) Iosefo Verevou	Rewa FC	3
4	(Fiji) Ronil Kumar	Ba FC	3
4	(Fiji) Vineet Chand	Navua FC	3
7	(Fiji) Nikhil Chand	Suva FC	2
7	(Fiji) Abbu Zahid Shaheed	Ba FC	2
7	(Fiji) Avinesh Waran Suwamy	Ba FC	2
7	(Fiji) Jone Vesikula	Ba FC	2
7	(Fiji) Osea Vakatalesau	Ba FC	2
7	(Fiji) Alvin Avinesh	Lautoka FC	2

== Positions by round ==
Team ╲ Round	1	2	3	4	5	6	7	8	9	10	11	12	13	14
Ba FC	4													2
Labasa FC	6													4
Lautoka FC	7													7
Nadi FC	5													3
Nadroga F.C.	1													6
Navua FC	8													8
Rewa FC	2													5
Suva FC	3													1
