= 2004 OFC Nations Cup squads =

The 2004 OFC Nations Cup was an international football tournament that was held in Adelaide, Australia from 29 May to 6 June 2004 (with a two-legged final taking place on 9 and 12 October 2004). The 6 national teams involved in the tournament were required to register a squad of players; only players in these squads were eligible to take part in the tournament. An initial four-team qualifying phase took place in Samoa and the Solomon Islands from 10 to 19 May 2004 allowing the top four, Fiji, Solomon Islands, Tahiti and Vanuatu, to move on and join Australia and New Zealand at the main tournament.

Players marked (c) were named as captain for their national squad. Players' club teams and players' age are as of 29 May 2004 – the tournament's opening day.

== Squad lists ==
=== Australia ===
Coach: Frank Farina

No.	Pos.	Player	Date of birth (age)	Caps	Club
1	GK	Mark Schwarzer	6 October 1972 (aged 31)		(England) Middlesbrough
2	DF	Jade North	7 January 1982 (aged 22)		(Australia) Perth Glory
3	DF	Stephen Laybutt	3 September 1977 (aged 26)		(Belgium) Excelsior Mouscron
4	DF	Simon Colosimo	8 January 1979 (aged 25)		(Australia) Parramatta Power
5	DF	Tony Vidmar (c)	4 July 1970 (aged 33)		(Wales) Cardiff City
6	MF	Scott Chipperfield	30 December 1975 (aged 28)		(Switzerland) Basel
7	MF	Brett Emerton	22 February 1979 (aged 25)		(England) Blackburn Rovers
8	MF	Josip Skoko	10 December 1975 (aged 28)		(Turkey) Gençlerbirliği
9	FW	John Aloisi	5 February 1976 (aged 28)		(Spain) Osasuna
10	MF	Tim Cahill	6 December 1979 (aged 24)		(England) Millwall
11	MF	Stan Lazaridis	16 August 1973 (aged 30)		(England) Birmingham City
12	FW	Alex Brosque	12 October 1983 (aged 20)		(Belgium) Westerlo
13	MF	Vince Grella	5 October 1979 (aged 24)		(Italy) Empoli
14	DF	Patrick Kisnorbo	24 March 1981 (aged 23)		(Scotland) Heart of Midlothian
15	FW	Mile Sterjovski	27 May 1979 (aged 25)		(France) Lille
16	DF	David Tarka	11 February 1983 (aged 21)		(England) Nottingham Forest
17	FW	David Zdrilic	13 April 1974 (aged 30)		(Scotland) Aberdeen
18	GK	Zeljko Kalac	16 December 1972 (aged 31)		(Italy) Perugia
19	FW	Max Vieri	1 September 1978 (aged 25)		(Italy) Napoli
20	DF	Adrian Madaschi	11 July 1982 (aged 21)		(Scotland) Partick Thistle
21	MF	Ahmad Elrich	30 May 1981 (aged 22)		(Australia) Parramatta Power
22	GK	Brad Jones	19 March 1982 (aged 22)		(England) Middlesbrough
23	MF	Mark Bresciano	11 February 1980 (aged 24)		(Italy) Parma

=== Fiji ===
Coach: (Australia) Tony Buesnel

No.	Pos.	Player	Date of birth (age)	Caps	Club
1	GK	Simione Tamanisau	5 June 1982 (aged 21)		(Fiji) Rewa
2	DF	Lorima Dau	29 July 1983 (aged 20)		(Fiji) Rewa
3	DF	Nikola Raoma	3 February 1977 (aged 27)		(New Zealand) Mangere United
4	MF	Alvin Avinesh	6 April 1982 (aged 22)		(Fiji) Lautoka
5	DF	Emosi Baleinuku	2 April 1975 (aged 29)		(Fiji) Rewa
6	DF	Jone Vesikula	30 April 1986 (aged 18)		(Fiji) Ba
7	MF	Stephen Morrel	27 May 1981 (aged 23)		(England) Leighton Town
8	DF	Malakai Kainihewe	28 July 1977 (aged 26)		(Fiji) Ba
9	FW	Thomas Vulivuli	24 May 1981 (aged 23)		(Fiji) Suva
10	MF	Veresa Toma	26 August 1981 (aged 22)		(Australia) Bentleigh Greens
11	FW	Pita Rabo	30 July 1977 (aged 26)		(Fiji) Rewa
12	FW	Esala Masi (c)	9 March 1974 (aged 30)		(Australia) Newcastle Jets
13	DF	Taniela Waqa	22 June 1983 (aged 20)		(Fiji) Lautoka
14	FW	Lagi Dyer	16 April 1972 (aged 32)		(Fiji) Rewa
15	MF	Salesh Kumar	28 July 1981 (aged 22)		(Fiji) Ba
16	DF	Viliame Toma	22 January 1979 (aged 25)		(Fiji) Nadi
17	MF	Seveci Rokotakala	29 May 1978 (aged 26)		(Fiji) Lautoka
18	MF	Laisiasa Gataurua	25 November 1981 (aged 22)		(Fiji) Suva
19	MF	Ovini Duguca	27 July 1978 (aged 25)		(Fiji) Nokia Eagles
21	DF	Pene Erenio	20 January 1981 (aged 23)		(Fiji) Rewa
22	GK	Waisake Sabutu	20 January 1981 (aged 23)		(Fiji) Rewa
23	GK	Laisenia Tuba	13 August 1978 (aged 25)		(Fiji) Ba

=== New Zealand ===
Coach: (England) Mick Waitt

No.	Pos.	Player	Date of birth (age)	Caps	Club
1	GK	Mark Paston	13 December 1976 (aged 27)		(England) Bradford City
2	DF	Duncan Oughton	14 June 1977 (aged 26)		(United States) Columbus Crew
3	DF	David Mulligan	24 March 1982 (aged 22)		(England) Doncaster Rovers
4	DF	Steven Old	17 February 1986 (aged 18)		(United States) St. John's Red Storm
5	DF	Che Bunce	29 August 1975 (aged 28)		(Denmark) Randers
6	DF	Tony Lochhead	12 January 1982 (aged 22)		(United States) UC Santa Barbara Gauchos
7	DF	Ivan Vicelich	3 September 1976 (aged 27)		(Netherlands) Roda JC
8	MF	Aaran Lines	21 December 1976 (aged 27)		(Poland) Arka Gdynia
9	FW	Noah Hickey	9 June 1978 (aged 25)		(Australia) Football Kingz
10	MF	Tim Brown	6 March 1981 (aged 23)		(United States) Cincinnati Bearcats
11	FW	Leo Bertos	20 December 1981 (aged 22)		(England) Rochdale
12	MF	Simon Elliott	10 June 1974 (aged 29)		(United States) Columbus Crew
13	FW	Brent Fisher	6 July 1983 (aged 20)		(Australia) Northern Spirit
14	DF	Ryan Nelsen (c)	18 October 1977 (aged 26)		(United States) D.C. United
15	DF	Michael Wilson	25 November 1980 (aged 23)		(United States) Minnesota Thunder
16	FW	Vaughan Coveny	13 December 1971 (aged 32)		(Australia) South Melbourne
17	MF	Raf de Gregorio	20 May 1977 (aged 27)		(Finland) HJK Helsinki
18	FW	Shane Smeltz	29 September 1981 (aged 22)		(Australia) Adelaide United
19	DF	Neil Jones	16 February 1982 (aged 22)		(United States) UC Santa Barbara Gauchos
20	DF	Andrew Boyens	18 September 1983 (aged 20)		(United States) New Mexico Lobos
21	DF	Rupesh Puna	19 April 1981 (aged 23)		(New Zealand) Caversham
22	GK	Glen Moss	19 January 1983 (aged 21)		(Australia) Sydney Olympic
23	GK	Tamati Williams	19 January 1984 (aged 20)		(Australia) Football Kingz

=== Solomon Islands ===
Coach: (England) Alan Gillett

No.	Pos.	Player	Date of birth (age)	Caps	Club
1	GK	Felix Ray Jr.	12 September 1983 (aged 20)		(Solomon Islands) Naha
2	DF	Leslie Leo	2 August 1976 (aged 27)		(Solomon Islands) Lauga
3	DF	Mahlon Houkarawa	23 April 1976 (aged 28)		(Solomon Islands) Koloale
4	DF	Martin Ruhasia	24 November 1977 (aged 26)		(Solomon Islands) Systek Kingz
5	DF	Phillip Boe	4 March 1982 (aged 22)		(Solomon Islands) Koloale
6	DF	Nelson Sale Kilifa	7 October 1986 (aged 17)		(Solomon Islands) Lauga
7	MF	Alick Maemae	10 December 1985 (aged 18)		(Solomon Islands) Koloale
8	FW	Joel Konofilia	7 January 1977 (aged 27)		(Australia) Brisbane Wolves
9	MF	George Aba	4 March 1984 (aged 20)		(Solomon Islands) JP Su'uria
10	FW	Batram Suri (c)	2 November 1971 (aged 32)		(Solomon Islands) JP Su'uria
11	FW	Commins Menapi	18 September 1977 (aged 26)		(Solomon Islands) JP Su'uria
12	MF	Francis Wasi	11 December 1976 (aged 27)		(Solomon Islands) Fairwest
13	MF	George Lui	21 December 1981 (aged 22)		(Solomon Islands) JP Su'uria
14	MF	Jack Samani	7 May 1979 (aged 25)		(Australia) Brisbane Wolves
15	MF	Moses Toata	10 October 1975 (aged 28)		(Solomon Islands) Fairwest
16	MF	Stanley Waita	10 October 1979 (aged 24)		(Solomon Islands) Naha
17	DF	Gideon Omokirio	12 October 1976 (aged 27)		(Solomon Islands) Fairwest
18	FW	Henry Fa'arodo	5 October 1982 (aged 21)		(Australia) Melbourne Knights
19	MF	Paul Kakai	26 September 1977 (aged 26)		(Solomon Islands) Lauga
20	GK	Severino Aefi	15 October 1970 (aged 33)		(Solomon Islands) Las United
21	DF	George Suri	16 July 1982 (aged 21)		(New Zealand) East Coast Bays
22	GK	Francis Aruwafu	9 March 1975 (aged 29)		(Solomon Islands) East Harbour Strikers

=== Tahiti ===
Coach: Gérard Kautai

No.	Pos.	Player	Date of birth (age)	Caps	Club
1	GK	Stanley Tien Wah	6 September 1977 (aged 26)		(French Polynesia) AS Dragon
2	DF	Angelo Tchen	8 March 1982 (aged 22)		(French Polynesia) AS Tefana
3	DF	Pierre Kugogne	3 July 1979 (aged 24)		(French Polynesia) AS Pirae
4	DF	Iotua Kautai	1 January 1983 (aged 21)		(French Polynesia) AS Pirae
5	DF	Jean-Yves Li Waut	2 July 1978 (aged 25)		(French Polynesia) AS Manu-Ura
6	DF	Harry Tong Sang	12 September 1982 (aged 21)		(French Polynesia) AS Dragon
7	DF	Samuel Garcia (c)	2 October 1975 (aged 28)		(French Polynesia) AS Vénus
8	MF	Billy Mataitai	20 July 1983 (aged 20)		(French Polynesia) AS Manu-Ura
9	FW	Gabriel Wajoka	7 November 1977 (aged 26)		(French Polynesia) AS PTT
10	FW	Axel Temataua	29 August 1980 (aged 23)		(French Polynesia) AS Manu-Ura
11	DF	Taufa Neuffer	30 August 1978 (aged 25)		(French Polynesia) AS Tefana
12	MF	Farahia Teuiria	29 August 1972 (aged 31)		(French Polynesia) AS Vaiete
13	DF	Vincent Simon	28 September 1983 (aged 20)		(French Polynesia) AS Pirae
14	FW	Rino Moretta	20 December 1983 (aged 20)		(French Polynesia) AS Tefana
15	MF	Larry Marmouyet	26 November 1980 (aged 23)		(French Polynesia) AS Tefana
16	FW	Félix Tagawa	23 March 1976 (aged 28)		(French Polynesia) AS Dragon
17	FW	Hiro Labaste	5 January 1973 (aged 31)		(French Polynesia) AS Tamarii Faa'a
18	FW	Georges Pitoeff	15 October 1979 (aged 24)		(French Polynesia) AS Vénus
19	GK	Daniel Tapeta	25 October 1974 (aged 29)		(French Polynesia) AS Manu-Ura
20	GK	Xavier Samin	1 January 1978 (aged 26)		(French Polynesia) AS Tefana

=== Vanuatu ===
Coach: (Uruguay) Juan Carlos Buzzetti

No.	Pos.	Player	Date of birth (age)	Caps	Club
1	GK	David Chilia (c)	10 June 1978 (aged 25)		(Vanuatu) Tupuji Imere
2	DF	Geoffrey Gete	3 August 1986 (aged 17)		(Vanuatu) Sia-Raga
3	DF	Manley Tabe	1 June 1981 (aged 22)		(Vanuatu) Shepherds United
4	DF	Lexa Bibi	16 April 1978 (aged 26)		(Vanuatu) Sia-Raga
5	DF	Simon Lauru	30 January 1972 (aged 32)		(Vanuatu) Shepherds United
6	DF	Graham Demas	25 October 1980 (aged 23)		(Vanuatu) Tafea
7	DF	Fedy Vava	25 November 1982 (aged 21)		(Vanuatu) Amicale
8	MF	Turei Iautu	22 May 1979 (aged 25)		(Vanuatu) Tafea
9	MF	Seimata Chilia	2 August 1978 (aged 25)		(Vanuatu) Tupuji Imere
10	FW	Etienne Mermer	26 January 1977 (aged 27)		(Australia) Mitchelton
11	MF	Moise Poida	2 April 1978 (aged 26)		(Vanuatu) Tafea
12	FW	Lorry Thompsen	2 November 1984 (aged 19)		(Vanuatu) Shepherds United
13	FW	Richard Iwai	15 March 1979 (aged 25)		(Australia) Mitchelton
14	MF	Pita Maki	12 October 1982 (aged 21)		(Vanuatu) Yatel
15	DF	Daniel Alick	30 July 1982 (aged 21)		(Vanuatu) Shepherds United
16	MF	Alphonse Qorig	7 July 1981 (aged 22)		(Vanuatu) Shepherds United
17	FW	Jean Maleb	7 July 1986 (aged 17)		(Vanuatu) Shepherds United
18	MF	Gérard Maki Haitong	6 July 1978 (aged 25)		(Vanuatu) Amicale
19	DF	Roger Joe	21 January 1986 (aged 18)		(Vanuatu) Shepherds United
20	GK	Charley Kalsanei	7 March 1986 (aged 18)		(Vanuatu) Shepherds United
21	DF	Tom Manses	9 November 1978 (aged 25)		(Vanuatu) Tafea

== Player representation ==
=== By club nationality ===
Players	Clubs
20	(French Polynesia) Tahiti
19	Vanuatu
18	Fiji, Solomon Islands
16	Australia
11	England
8	United States
4	Italy, New Zealand
3	Scotland
2	Belgium
1	Denmark, Finland, France, Netherlands, Poland, Spain, Switzerland, Turkey

Nations in italics are not represented by their national teams in the finals.

=== By representatives of domestic league ===
National Squad	No.
Australia	3
Fiji	18
New Zealand	2
Solomon Islands	18
Tahiti	20
Vanuatu	19
