= 2009–10 OFC Champions League =

Tournament details
- Dates: 17 October 2009 – 2 May 2010
- Teams: 8 (from 7 associations)

Final positions
- Champions: (Papua New Guinea) Hekari United (1st title)
- Runners-up: (New Zealand) Waitakere United

Tournament statistics
- Matches played: 26
- Goals scored: 85 (3.27 per match)
- Top scorer(s): (Papua New Guinea) Kema Jack (Croatia) Daniel Koprivcic (7 goals each)
- All statistics correct as of 04:03, 2 May 2010 (UTC).

The 2009–10 OFC Champions League, also known as the 2010 O-League for short, was the 9th edition of the Oceanian Club Championship, Oceania's premier club football tournament organized by the Oceania Football Confederation (OFC), and the 4th season under the current OFC Champions League name. It was contested by eight teams from seven countries. The teams were split into two four-team pools, the winner of each pool contesting the title of O-League Champion and the right to represent the OFC at the 2010 FIFA Club World Cup. This was an expansion from previous tournaments which feature six teams in the group stage.

The tournament was won by Hekari United of Papua New Guinea. They became the first team from outside New Zealand and Australia to be crowned Oceanian club champion.

== Participants ==
Location of teams of the 2009–10 OFC Champions League.

Association	Team	Qualifying method
Fiji	Lautoka	2009 Fiji National League premier
New Caledonia	Magenta	2008–09 New Caledonia Division Honneur champion
New Zealand	Auckland City	2008–09 New Zealand Football Championship champion
New Zealand	Waitakere United	2008–09 New Zealand Football Championship premier
Papua New Guinea	Hekari United	2008–09 Papua New Guinea National Soccer League champion
Solomon Islands	Marist	2008–09 Solomon Islands National Club Championship champion
(French Polynesia) Tahiti	Manu-Ura	2008–09 Tahiti Division Fédérale champion
Vanuatu	Tafea	2009 Vanuatu Football Federation Bred Cup winner

== Group stage ==
Winners of each group advance to the final.

=== Group A ===
Team	Pld	W	D	L	GF	GA	GD	Pts	WAI	AUC	MAG	MAN
(New Zealand) Waitakere United	6	3	3	0	15	6	+9	12		1–1	4–1	2–0
(New Zealand) Auckland City	6	3	3	0	13	5	+8	12	2–2		2–1	5–0
(New Caledonia) Magenta	6	1	3	2	13	10	+3	6	1–1	1–1		8–1
(French Polynesia) Manu-Ura	6	0	1	5	3	23	−20	1	1–5	0–2	1–1	

17 October 2009
15:00 UTC+13

Auckland City (New Zealand)	5 – 0	(French Polynesia) Manu-Ura
Ivan Vicelich 18'; Chad Coombes 34'; Daniel Koprivcic 69', 80', 90+1' (pen.)	Report

Kiwitea Street, Auckland
Attendance: 875
Referee: Gerard Parsons (Australia)
24 October 2009
16:00 UTC+11

Magenta (New Caledonia)	1 – 1	(New Zealand) Waitakere United
Aaron Scott 78' (o.g.)	Report	Brent Fisher 37'

Stade Numa-Daly Magenta, Noumea
Attendance: 2,000
Referee: Norbert Hauata (Tahiti)

7 November 2009
15:00 UTC+13

Waitakere United (New Zealand)	2 – 0	(French Polynesia) Manu-Ura
Benjamin Totori 55'; Brent Fisher 86' (pen.)	Report

Fred Taylor Park, Whangārei
Referee: Kevin Docherty (Australia)
8 November 2009
15:00 UTC+13

Auckland City (New Zealand)	2 – 1	(New Caledonia) Magenta
Matt Williams 47'; Daniel Koprivcic 52'	Report	Lamo Xewe 6'

Kiwitea Street, Auckland
Referee: Rakesh Varman (Fiji)

28 November 2009
15:00 UTC+13

Waitakere United (New Zealand)	1 – 1	(New Zealand) Auckland City
Brent Fisher 42'	Report	Chad Coombes 30'

Fred Taylor Park, Whangārei
Referee: Jamie Cross (New Zealand)
27 November 2009
17:00 UTC-10

Manu-Ura (French Polynesia)	1 – 1	(New Caledonia) Magenta
Billy Mataitai 68'	Report	Philippe Kokono 46'

Stade Hamuta, Papeete
Referee: Peter O'Leary (New Zealand)

12 February 2010
19:30 UTC-10

Manu-Ura (French Polynesia)	0 – 2	(New Zealand) Auckland City
	Report	Ian Hogg 63'; Daniel Koprivcic 89'

Stade Hamuta, Papeete
Referee: Rakesh Varman (Fiji)
20 February 2010
15:00 UTC+13

Waitakere United (New Zealand)	4 – 1	(New Caledonia) Magenta
Martin Bullock 39'; Benjamin Totori 40'; Ryan De Vries 78'; Brent Fisher 80'	Report	Ludovic Boit 6'

Fred Taylor Park, Whangārei

6 March 2010
15:00 UTC+11

Magenta (New Caledonia)	1 – 1	(New Zealand) Auckland City
Andre Sinedo 53'	Report	Daniel Koprivcic 13'

Stade Numa-Daly Magenta, Noumea
Referee: Norbert Hauata (Tahiti)
19 March 2010
19:30 UTC-10

Manu-Ura (French Polynesia)	1 – 5	(New Zealand) Waitakere United
Hiroana Poroiea 30'	Report	Jason Rowley 28', 58'; Roy Krishna 42'; Allan Pearce 45', 60'

Stade Hamuta, Papeete
Referee: Isidore Assiene-Ambassa (New Caledonia)

27 March 2010
15:00 UTC+11

Magenta (New Caledonia)	8 – 1	(French Polynesia) Manu-Ura
Pierre Wajoka 14'; Stephane Tuairau 18' (o.g.); Marius Bako 31'; Noël Kaudré 49'; Paul Poatinda 58'; Judikael Ixoée 82'; Lamo Xewe 90'; Jean-Philippe Saïko 90+1'		Hiroana Poroiea 45'

Stade Numa-Daly Magenta, Noumea
28 March 2010
15:00 UTC+13

Auckland City (New Zealand)	2 – 2	(New Zealand) Waitakere United
Daniel Koprivcic 30'; Greg Uhlmann 70'	Report	Benjamin Totori 3', 58'

Kiwitea Street, Auckland
Attendance: 2,500
Referee: Norbert Hauata (Tahiti)

=== Group B ===
Team	Pld	W	D	L	GF	GA	GD	Pts	HEK	LAU	TAF	MAR
(Papua New Guinea) Hekari United	6	4	1	1	15	7	+8	13		1–2	4–0	2–1
(Fiji) Lautoka	6	4	0	2	12	6	+6	12	0–1		1–2	3–0
(Vanuatu) Tafea	6	2	2	2	8	11	−3	8	3–3	1–3		0–0
(Solomon Islands) Marist	6	0	1	5	3	14	−11	1	1–4	1–3	0–2	

17 October 2009
15:00 UTC+11

Tafea (Vanuatu)	3 – 3	(Papua New Guinea) Hekari United
Silas Namatak 1'; Robert Tom 34'; François Sakama 45'		Kema Jack 40', 42'; Benjamin Mela 50'

Port Vila Municipal Stadium, Port Vila
Attendance: 4,000
Referee: Jamie Cross (New Zealand)
18 October 2009
15:00 UTC+11

Marist (Solomon Islands)	1 – 3	(Fiji) Lautoka
Abraham Iniga 82'		Kamal Hassan 14'; Samuela Kautoga 20'; Nahuel Arrarte 90+2'

Lawson Tama Stadium, Honiara
Attendance: 16,000
Referee: Chris Kerr (New Zealand)

7 November 2009
15:00 UTC+11

Marist (Solomon Islands)	0 – 2	(Vanuatu) Tafea
		François Sakama 48'; Etienne Mermer 51'

Lawson Tama Stadium, Honiara
Attendance: 8,000
Referee: Andrew Achari (Fiji)
7 November 2009
15:00 UTC+10

Hekari United (Papua New Guinea)	1 – 2	(Fiji) Lautoka
Kema Jack 28'		Valerio Nawatu 69'; Apisai Smith 76'

PMRL Stadium, Port Moresby
Attendance: 10,000
Referee: John Saohu (Solomon Islands)

29 November 2009
15:00 UTC+13

Lautoka (Fiji)	1 – 2	(Vanuatu) Tafea
Valerio Nawatu 45+1'		Jean Nako Naprapol 22'; François Sakama 77'

Churchill Park, Lautoka
Attendance: 6,000
Referee: Norbert Hauata (Tahiti)
5 December 2009
15:00 UTC+10

Hekari United (Papua New Guinea)	2 – 1	(Solomon Islands) Marist
Kema Jack 48'; Joachim Waroi 52'	Report	Commins Menapi 82'

PMRL Stadium, Port Moresby
Attendance: 2,000
Referee: Chris Beath (Australia)

13 February 2010
15:00 UTC+10

Hekari United (Papua New Guinea)	4 – 0	(Vanuatu) Tafea
Tuimasi Manuca 14'; Alick Maemae 20', 28'; Joachim Waroi 84'	Report

PMRL Stadium, Port Moresby
Referee: Peter O'Leary (New Zealand)
14 February 2010
15:00 UTC+13

Lautoka (Fiji)	3 – 0	(Solomon Islands) Marist
Osea Vakatalesau 8'; Alvin Avinesh 49'; Jone Vono 73'	Report

Churchill Park, Lautoka
Referee: Mirko Benischke (New Zealand)

6 March 2010
15:00 UTC+11

Tafea (Vanuatu)	0 – 0	(Solomon Islands) Marist
	Report

Port Vila Municipal Stadium, Port Vila
Referee: Isidore Assiene-Ambassa (New Caledonia)
7 March 2010
15:00 UTC+13

Lautoka (Fiji)	0 – 1	(Papua New Guinea) Hekari United
	Report	Henry Fa'arodo 54'

Churchill Park, Lautoka
Referee: Chris Kerr (New Zealand)

27 March 2010
15:00 UTC+11

Marist (Solomon Islands)	1 – 4	(Papua New Guinea) Hekari United
Commins Menapi 78'	Report	Alick Maemae 18', 29'; Henry Fa'arodo 29'; Pita Bolaitoga 39'

Lawson Tama Stadium, Honiara
Referee: Chris Kerr (New Zealand)
27 March 2010
15:00 UTC+11

Tafea (Vanuatu)	1 – 3	(Fiji) Lautoka
Geoffrey Gete 57'	Report	Samuela Vula 35'; Jone Vono 51'; Sailesh Samy 86'

Port Vila Municipal Stadium, Port Vila
Referee: Michael Hester (New Zealand)

== Final ==
The two group winners will play-off over two legs to determine the 2009–10 OFC Champions League winners.

Team 1	Agg.	Team 2	1st leg	2nd leg
Hekari United (Papua New Guinea)	4–2	(New Zealand) Waitakere United	3–0	1–2

17 April 2010
15:00 UTC+10

Hekari United (Papua New Guinea)	3 – 0	(New Zealand) Waitakere United
Kema Jack 27', 73'; Alick Maemae 49'	Report

PMRL Stadium, Port Moresby
Attendance: 15,000
Referee: Gerard Parsons (Australia)

2 May 2010
14:00 UTC+12

Waitakere United (New Zealand)	2 – 1	(Papua New Guinea) Hekari United
Neil Emblen 3'; Brent Fisher 84' (pen.)	Report	Kema Jack 35' (pen.)

Fred Taylor Park, Auckland
Attendance: 3,000
Referee: Norbert Hauata (Tahiti)

Hekari United won 4–2 on aggregate. As OFC Champions League winners they qualify for the qualifying round of the 2010 FIFA Club World Cup.

OFC Champions League
2009–10 Winners
(Papua New Guinea)
Hekari United
First title

== Topscorers ==
As of 2 May 2010.

Rank	Player	Club	MD1	MD2	MD3	MD4	MD5	MD6	F1	F2	Total
1	(Papua New Guinea) Kema Jack	(Papua New Guinea) Hekari United	2	1	1				2	1	7
1	(Croatia) Daniel Koprivcic	(New Zealand) Auckland City	3	1		1	1	1			7
3	(New Zealand) Brent Fisher	(New Zealand) Waitakere United	1	1	1	1				1	5
3	(Solomon Islands) Alick Maemae	(Papua New Guinea) Hekari United				2		2	1		5
5	(Solomon Islands) Benjamin Totori	(New Zealand) Waitakere United						2			4
6	(Vanuatu) François Sakama	(Vanuatu) Tafea	1	1	1						3
7	(New Zealand) Chad Coombes	(New Zealand) Auckland City	1		1						2
7	(Solomon Islands) Henry Fa'arodo	(Papua New Guinea) Hekari United					1	1			2
7	(Solomon Islands) Commins Menapi	(Solomon Islands) Marist			1			1			2
7	(Fiji) Valreio Nawatu	(Fiji) Lautoka		1	1						2
7	(New Zealand) Allan Pearce	(New Zealand) Waitakere United					2				2
7	(French Polynesia) Hiroana Poroiea	(French Polynesia) Manu-Ura					1	1			2
7	(New Zealand) Jason Rowley	(New Zealand) Waitakere United					2				2
7	(Fiji) Jone Vono	(Fiji) Lautoka				1		1			2
7	(Solomon Islands) Joachim Waroi	(Papua New Guinea) Hekari United			1	1					2
7	(New Caledonia) Lamo Xewe	(New Caledonia) Magenta		1				1			2

- 32 single goal scorers
- 2 own goals scored
