= 2008 OFC U-20 Championship squads =

Teams from New Zealand, Fiji, New Caledonia and Tahiti played in the Oceania Football Confederation under-20 tournament in 2008.

== New Zealand ==
Coach: (New Zealand) Stu Jacobs

No.	Pos.	Player	Date of birth (age)	Caps	Club
1	GK	Rhys Keane			
2	DF	Tim Myers			(New Zealand) Waitakere United
3	DF	Ian Hogg (captain)	15 December 1989 (aged 18)		(New Zealand) Auckland City FC
4		Finlay Milne			
5		Sam Campbell			
6	MF	Michael Eager			(New Zealand) Team Wellington
7	FW	Costa Barbarouses	19 February 1990 (aged 18)		(New Zealand) Wellington Phoenix
8	MF	Adam McGeorge			
9	FW	Greg Draper	13 August 1989 (aged 19)		(New Zealand) Wellington Phoenix
10		Milos Nikolic			
11		John Niyonsaba			
12	MF	Cory Chettleburgh			(New Zealand) YoungHeart Manawatu
13		Ash Solly			
14		Jonathan Raj			
15	MF	Michael Pickering			(New Zealand)
16		Alex Barlow			
17	DF	Jacob Matthews			
18	MF	Sam Blackburn			(New Zealand) Team Wellington
19		Nick Keown-Robson			
20	GK	Jake Gleeson			(New Zealand) Team Wellington

== Fiji ==
Coach: (Fiji) Carlos Buzzetti

No.	Pos.	Player	Date of birth (age)	Caps	Club
1	GK	Wasim Ali			
2		Peniame Drova			
3		Amani Makoe			
4		Josefata Neibuli			
5		Romuero			
6		Esava Naqeleca			
7		Sumeet Krishan			
8		Ratu Vula Bonaveidogo			
9		Taione Kerevanua			
10		Nasoni Mereke			
11		Monit Chand			
12		Archie Watkins			
13		James McKay			
14		Velagio Draunimasi			
15		Jese Ilimotama			
16		Ranjesh Prasad			
17		Samuela Drudru			
18		Joseva Basudra			
19		Maciu Tuilau			
20	GK	Filimone Boletawa			

== New Caledonia ==
Coach: (France) Didier Chambaron

No.	Pos.	Player	Date of birth (age)	Caps	Club
1	GK	Jean Daniel Caee			
2		Joris GORENDIAWE			
3		Edmond IPUNESSO			
4		Jonathan KAKOU			
5		Jean Claude JEWINE			
6		Cesar LOLOHEA			
7		Maxime CHEVRY			
8		Jean WAHNYAMALLA			
9		Roy KAYARA			
10		Rony ATTI			
11		Warren NAXUE			
12		Alan HNAUTRA			
13		Vincent VAKIE			
14		Jean Philippe SAIKO			
15		Jihovany LOLOHEA			
16		Theodore HNANGANYAN			
17		Yoahn AUSU			
18		Jean TYEA			
19		Yoann BAKO			
20	GK	Nicolas IWA			

== Tahiti ==
Coach: (France) Lionel Charbonnier

No.	Pos.	Player	Date of birth (age)	Caps	Club
2		Tauirai Teiva			
3	DF	Stephane Faatiarau	13 March 1990 (aged 19)		(French Polynesia) Tefana
4	DF	Teheivarii Ludivion	1 July 1989 (aged 20)		(French Polynesia) Vénus
5	DF	Ariihau Teriitau (c)	23 January 1989 (aged 20)		(French Polynesia) Vaiete
6	MF	Heimano Bourebare	15 May 1989 (aged 20)		(French Polynesia) Tefana
7	FW	Garry Rochette	6 January 1990 (aged 19)		(French Polynesia) Taravao AC
8	FW	Heiarii Tavanae	15 February 1992 (aged 17)		(French Polynesia) Central Sport
9	MF	Hiva Kamoise	17 January 1992 (aged 17)		(French Polynesia) Jeunes Tahitiens
11	FW	Stanley Atani	27 January 1990 (aged 19)		(French Polynesia) Jeunes Tahitiens
12		Rangitea Benett			
13	FW	Steevy Chong Hue	26 January 1990 (aged 19)		(French Polynesia) Samine
15		Rainui Tze Yu			
17		Nahui Teiefitu			
18		Tehau Benett			
19	DF	Marama Amau	13 January 1991 (aged 18)		(French Polynesia) Vénus
20	MF	Lorenzo Tehau	10 April 1989 (aged 20)		(French Polynesia) Tefana
21	MF	Alvin Tehau	10 April 1989 (aged 20)		(French Polynesia) Tefana
22	GK	Teheipuarii Hauata	20 January 1991 (aged 18)		(French Polynesia) Tefana
23		Jason Mathieu			
