= Marama =

Marama relates to more than one article:

== People ==
=== Politicians ===
- Mārama, Māori woman who signed the Treaty of Waitangi
- Te Mārama, Māori woman who signed the Treaty of Waitangi
- Marama Davidson, New Zealand politician and Member of Parliament
- Marama Fox, New Zealand politician
- Marama Leonard-Higgins, Māori elder in the Ngāi Tahu iwi
- Mārama Russell, New Zealand midwife and tribal leader
- Marama Teururai, Tahitian royal and Regent of Huahine

=== Sport ===
- Marama Amau, Tahitian footballer
- Marama Vahirua (born 1980), a Tahitian footballer
- Eden Marama, New Zealand tennis player
- Paula Marama, New Zealand tennis player

=== Arts, entertainment, and media ===
- Marama Martin, Māori television and radio broadcaster
- Kiki Marama, of the New Zealand hip hop group Upper Hutt Posse
- Marama Corlett, Maltese actress and dancer
- Márama, a Uruguayan band

== Other ==
- Mārama (film), a 2025 New Zealand gothic horror film
- Marama, South Australia, a town and a locality
- Marama (mythology) (or 'malama'), a widespread Polynesian word for 'moon' or 'light'. It may also be the name of a Cook Island lunar deity
- Marama bean (Tylosema esculentum), a plant native to Africa
- Marama tribe (Luhya), an indigenous tribe of Kenya
- Marama Hall, an academic building and concert hall at the University of Otago, New Zealand
- SS Marama, the name of two ships

== See also ==
- Maramarua
