= Permal (surname) =

Permal is a surname. Notable people with the surname include:

- Cédric Permal (born 1991), Mauritian footballer
- John Permal (1946–2019), Pakistani sprinter
- Jonathan Permal (born 1994), Mauritian track and field athlete
- Manav Permal (born 1999), Fijian footballer

== See also ==
- Ermal
