= 2027 Champion versus Champion =

Tournament details
- Dates: TBD
- Teams: 2

The 2027 Champion versus Champion will be the 34th edition of the Champion versus Champion tournament, the super cup competition in Fijian men's association football. Ba and Navua will face each other in a two-legged series.

== Teams ==
Ba qualified for the tournament after winning the 2026 Fiji Premier League title. After Ba won all four major competitions in Fiji, the second place spot then went to Navua, the runner-up at the 2026 Inter-District Championship.

== Matches ==
TBD

Ba	v	Navua

Subrail Park, Labasa, Fiji

TBD

Ba	v	Navua

Ratu Cakobau Park, Nausori, Fiji
