= Lagi =

Lagi may refer to:

== People ==
- Lagi Dyer (born 1972), Fijian football player
- Lagi Letoa, Samoan lawn bowler
- Lagi Setu (born 1988), Samoan rugby league player
- Lagi Tuima (born 1998), English rugby union player
- Lagi von Ballestrem

== Other uses ==
- Lagi, an alternative spelling of the town of La Gi, in Bình Thuận province, Vietnam
- Lagi, Laconia, a settlement in Laconia, Greece
- Lagi (song), 2022 single by Bini
