= Champions League 2009–10 =

Champions League 2009–10 may refer to:

- 2009–10 UEFA Champions League
- CONCACAF Champions League 2009–10
- OFC Champions League 2009–10
