= Mapou (name) =

Mapou is a name.

== List of people with the name ==
- Mapou Yanga-Mbiwa (born 1989), French professional footballer
- Louis Mapou (born 1958), New Caledonian president
- Marius Mapou (born 1980), New Caledonian footballer

== See also ==
- Mapou (village)
- Myrsine australis
