= Amau =

Amau or AMAU may refer to:

- AMA University, in the Philippines
- Amau Doctrine, a Japanese nationalist ideology
- Marama Amau (born 1991), Tahitian footballer
