= Yogendra Dutt =

Fijian professional football manager

Personal information
- Place of birth: Fiji

Managerial career
- Years: Team
- 2006–2009: Ba F.C.
- 2009–2010: Fiji
- 2011–2012: Ba F.C.

Yogendra Dutt is a Fijian professional football manager. From 2006 to 2009 he worked as a manager for Ba F.C. In July 2009 Dutt was the new coach of Fiji national football team. From 2011 he again worked as a manager for Ba F.C.

== Honour ==
- League Championship (for Districts): 5

2006, 2008, 2011, 2012, 2013

- Inter-District Championship : 3

2006, 2007, 2013

- Battle of the Giants: 5

2006, 2007, 2008, 2012, 2013

- Coach of the Year Award: 2

2006, 2007
