= Olivier Dokunengo =

New Caledonian footballer (born 1979)

Personal information
- Date of birth: 4 September 1979 (age 47)
- Place of birth: New Caledonia
- Position: Midfielder

Senior career*
| Years | Team | Apps | (Gls) |
| 2008–2013 | AS Mont-Dore | 56 | (23) |
| 2014–2015 | AS Magenta | 20 | (5) |

International career^{‡}
| 2003–2013 | New Caledonia | 17 | (1) |
Medal record
Men's football
Representing New Caledonia
OFC Nations Cup
| Runner-up | 2008 Oceania |
| Runner-up | 2012 Solomon Islands |
Pacific Games
| Gold medal – first place | 2011 New Caledonia |
| Silver medal – second place | 2003 Fiji |
- * Club domestic league appearances and goals as of 25 June 2016 ‡ National team caps and goals as of 25 June 2016

Olivier Dokunengo (born 4 September 1979) is a New Caledonian footballer who plays as a midfielder for AS Magenta in the New Caledonia Super Ligue.

== Honours ==
New Caledonia

- OFC Nations Cup: Runner-up, 2008, 2012
- Pacific Games: Gold Medalist, 2011; Silver Medalist, 2003
