= Franco Parisi (soccer) =

Australian soccer player (born 1983)

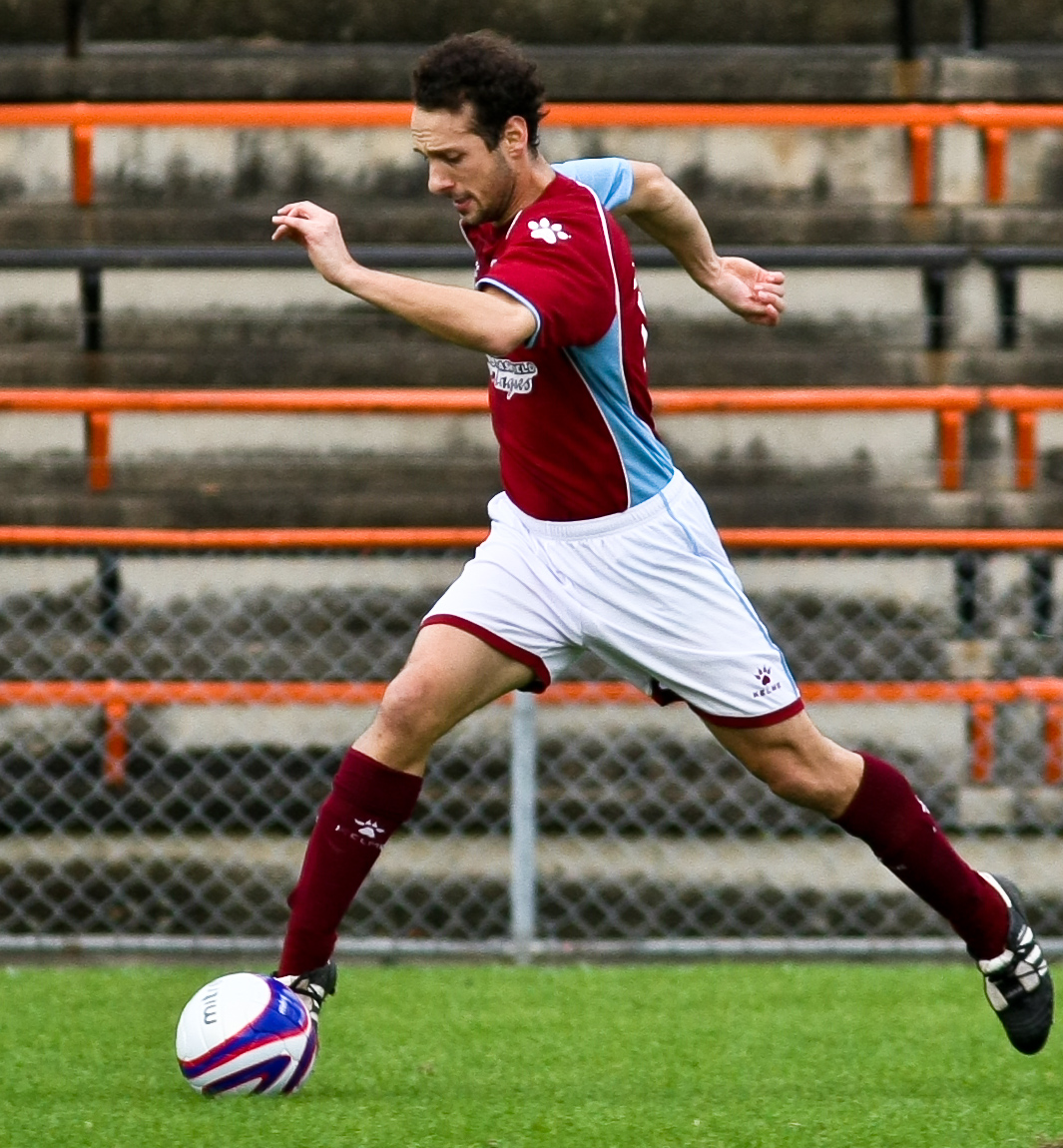

Personal information
- Full name: Franco Parisi
- Date of birth: 3 May 1983 (age 43)
- Place of birth: Sydney, Australia
- Height: 1.78 m (5 ft 10 in)
- Position: Forward

Team information
- Current team: APIA Leichhardt (head coach)

Youth career
- 1994–1999: APIA Leichhardt
- 2000: A.I.S.

Senior career*
Years	Team	Apps	(Gls)
2000–2001	Sydney Olympic	14	(4)
2001–2002	Telstar		
2002–2003	Sydney Olympic	25	(9)
2003–2004	Sydney United	19	(1)
2005	FC Baden		
2005–2006	Newcastle Jets	9	(2)
2006–2007	New Zealand Knights	1	(0)
2007–2022	APIA Leichhardt	289	(37)

International career
2001–2003	Australia U-20	6	(4)

Managerial career
- 2023–: APIA Leichhardt
Medal record
Representing Australia
Men's Association football
OFC U-20 Championship
Winner	2002 Fiji/Vanuatu
- * Club domestic league appearances and goals as of 29 September 2022

Franco Parisi (born 3 May 1983) is an Australian football manager and former player. He is currently the Head Coach for NPL NSW club APIA Leichhardt. Regarded as a club legend, Parisi made over 300 appearances during his time as a player for APIA.

== Club career ==
=== Youth career ===
As a youth, Parisi played with APIA Leichhardt since 1994 and developed a passion for the club growing up. In 2000, Parisi played with the AIS before being signed by Sydney Olympic.

=== Sydney Olympic ===
Parisi made his senior club debut for Sydney Olympic, scoring two goals against Canberra Cosmos. After spending a year with SC Telstar, Parisi returned to Olympic for the 2002–03 season. Despite some poor form and injury setbacks, Parisi found his rhythm and finished the season strong, helping Olympic win the Premiership. He left the club to join local rivals Sydney United.

=== Sydney United ===
Parisi played for Sydney United during the final seasons of the National Soccer League. United struggled to find the net despite Parisi setting up many chances for his side to score and failing to break their goal-scoring drought during the early start of the season. He scored his only goal in the league in a 3–0 win against Brisbane Strikers to which he also won a penalty for his side.

=== Newcastle Jets ===
Parisi joined the Newcastle Jets to play in the new A-League division. Parisi scored his first goal for the club in a 4–1 defeat against Perth Glory, and his second in the F3 Derby where he scored the winner in the 88th minute, helping his side win 1–0 by full time.

=== New Zealand Knights ===
Parisi briefly played for New Zealand Knights. His only appearance for the club would be against his former club Newcastle where he played just 14 minutes of the match.

=== APIA Leichhardt ===
In 2007, Parisi joined APIA Leichhardt after struggling to find game time. After three seasons where the team consistently finished in the lower half of the league, Parisi's form came during the 2010 season. Helping APIA progress to the finals series, where he scored the winning goal against Marconi in the opening stage before being knocked out by Sydney United.

On July 7, 2013, Franco Parisi played a crucial role in APIA's win in the Waratah Cup, which marked their first domestic cup success in 21 years. He was named man of the match for his impressive performance, which included scoring a goal and assisting two others that ultimately led to their victory. This also led them to be one of the first NSW club to play in the new FFA Cup.

During the 2015 season, Parisi played a crucial role in securing a 4–4 draw for his team against the Blacktown Spartans in the final round, contributing two goals to the scoreline. As a result of his performances throughout the season, Parisi was honored with the Player of the Year award on 10 September 2015, receiving 13 votes at the awards ceremony.

On 13 August 2017, Parisi played a pivotal role in securing the premiership league title, as his team clinched a 1–1 draw against Manly United. This victory marked the end of their 30-year league title drought, and Parisi's contributions were essential to the team's success. APIA's title winning performance in the competition earned them a spot in the semi-finals, where Parisi played in a convincing 5–0 victory over Rockdale City. Despite this, they missed out on the championship title, as they were defeated in the final by Manly United after a 4–3 lost in a penalty shootout in front of a crowd of 3500 spectators.

On 22 August 2018, Parisi was applauded for his standout performance where he started in the match squad that pulled off a shock 3–2 victory over Melbourne Victory in the FFA Cup. During a post-match interview, Parisi spoke confidently about the quality of the squad, citing the team's depth and individual talent as reasons for their potential success at a higher level. On 11 September 2018, Parisi made another appearance in the Grand Final, facing off against his former club, Sydney Olympic. Parisi's APIA ended up losing 3–1, resulting in them being the runners-up for the second consecutive year. Despite this, Parisi was able to lift his second Waratah Cup trophy by guiding his team to a 3–0 victory over Hakoah.

During the 2019 season, Parisi demonstrated his quality and experience by leading his team to a 5–1 win against Rockdale and a 3–0 win against Hakoah. On 1 September 2019, Parisi, in his third Grand Final appearance, secured the championship for APIA by defeating Sydney United 2–1 after extra-time ending the club 16 year championship drought.

On 7 December 2021, Parisi was in the match squad that defeated the Wanderers 2–1 in the 2021 FFA Cup. In his final season as a player, Parisi featured in 25 matches for his team, who finished fifth in the league and advanced to the finals series. After defeating Marconi in the initial stage, Parisi's team was eventually eliminated by Blacktown City.

== International career ==
Parisi was first called up into the Australian U-20 squad in 2001. He made his first U-20 cap against Japan coming on in the 46th minute.

Parisi was selected to play in the 2002 OFC U-20 Championship, but was injured prior to the group stage. After recovering, he featured in both legs of the final against Fiji, scoring in each game and helping Australia secure a spot in the FIFA U-20 World Cup in the United Arab Emirates. In October 2003, he was added to the Australian U20 National squad for the 2003 FIFA World Youth Championship.

== Coaching career ==
Parisi was appointed as Head Coach for the APIA after the 2022 season, along with teammate and club legend David D'Apuzzo who will be Assistant Coach.

== Honours ==
Australia U-20

- OFC U-19 Men's Championship: 2002
