= J. D. Maharaj =

Jitendra Durga Maharaj (died December 2006) was a Fijian sports administrator. He had been mainly involved with the Fiji Football Association, holding positions of Secretary and Executive Director of the Association. He is credited with the introduction of the Battle of the Giants soccer tournament in 1978.

Other positions that he held were:

- chef de mission of the Fiji team to the 2002 Manchester Commonwealth Games
- South Pacific Games Chief Executive 2003
- Treasurer of Oceania Football Confederation from 1990
- Match Commissioner of the Oceania U-20 World Cup 2001 Qualifiers

He died in December 2006.

In October 2009 he was awarded the Fiji Olympic Order by the Fiji Association of Sports and National Olympic Committee.
