= Ravinesh Kumar =

Fijian football manager (born 1976)

Personal information
- Date of birth: 12 May 1976 (age 50)
- Place of birth: Ba Province, Fiji

Youth career
- Ba

Senior career*
Years	Team	Apps	(Gls)
–1999	Vatukoula		
2001–2002	Nasinu		
2003	Ba		
2004	Nasinu		
2005	Tavua		
2006	Lautoka		

Managerial career
- 2006: Fiji U20 (assistant)
- 2007–2009: Ba (youth)
- 2010: Fiji U17 (assistant)
- 2011–2014: Fiji U20
- 2013: Lautoka
- 2014–2020: Fiji (technical director)
- 2016: Fiji U23 (assistant)
- 2020: Lautoka
- 2023: Papakura City (assistant)
- 2024: Samoa
Medal record
Men's football
Representing Fiji (as manager)
OFC U-20 Championship
Winner	2014 Fiji
Runner-up	2013 Fiji
- * Club domestic league appearances and goals

Ravinesh Kumar (born 12 May 1976) is a Fijian football manager and former player who last managed the Samoa national football team.

== Life and career ==
Kumar was born on 12 May 1976 in Ba Province, Fiji. As a youth player, he joined the youth academy of Fijian side Ba. He started his senior career with Fijian side Vatukoula. In 2001, he signed for Fijian side Nasinu. In 2003, he signed for Fijian side Ba. He played for the club in the 2003 Champion versus Champion. In 2004, he returned to Fijian side Nasinu. In 2005, he signed for Fijian side Tavua. In 2006, he signed for Fijian side Lautoka. He obtained an A License. He became the first Fijian football manager to obtain the license. He has been regarded to prefer the 4-3-3 formation. In 2006, Kumar was appointed as an assistant manager of the Fiji national under-20 football team. In 2007, he was appointed as a youth manager of Fijian side Ba.

In 2010, he was appointed as an assistant manager of the Fiji national under-17 football team. In 2011, he was appointed manager of the Fiji national under-20 football team. He helped the team achieve qualification for the 2015 FIFA U-20 World Cup. In 2013, he was appointed manager of Fijian side Lautoka. In 2014, he was appointed technical director of the Fiji national football team. In 2016, he was appointed as an assistant manager of the Fiji national under-23 football team. He worked with them for the 2016 Summer Olympics. In 2020, he returned as manager of Fijian side Lautoka. In 2023, he was appointed as an assistant manager of New Zealand side Papakura City. In 2024, he was appointed as a manager of the Samoa national football team. Fiji Live wrote that a "Kumar's influence was clearly visible as the Samoans played more organized and tactical football" while managing the team.

== Honours ==
=== Manager ===
Fiji U20

- OFC U-20 Championship: 2014; runner-up 2013
