= Ermal =

Ermal (pronounced [ɛɾˈmal]) is an Albanian masculine given name, which means "wind of the mountain". People named Ermal include:

- Ermal Allen (1918–1988), American football quarterback and assistant coach
- Ermal Bojdani (born 1985), Albanian-American physician, emergency and public psychiatrist, scientist, teacher of clinical medicine
- Ermal C. Fraze (1913–1989), American engineer and inventor
- Ermal Fejzullahu (born 1988), Kosovar singer
- Ermal Hadribeaj (born 1993), Albanian-American boxer and mixed martial artist
- Ermal Hajdari (born 1992), Swedish footballer
- Ermal Krasniqi (born 1998), Kosovar footballer
- Ermal Kuqo (born 1980), Albanian basketball player
- Ermal Mamaqi (born 1982), Albanian actor, singer, comedian and DJ
- Ermal Meta (footballer) (born 2005), Albanian footballer
- Ermal Meta (born 1981), Albanian-Italian singer and songwriter
- Ermal Peçi (born 1988), Albanian TV host
- Ermal Tahiri (born 1969), Albanian footballer.

Ermal may also refer to:

- Ermal Island, a peninsula in Vieira do Minho, Portugal
