= Marama Leonard-Higgins =

Elder in the Ngāi Tahu iwi of the South Island of New Zealand

Whare Marama Leonard-Higgins (1928–2012) was an elder in the Ngāi Tahu iwi of the South Island of New Zealand.

== Life ==
Leonard-Higgins attended Moeraki Primary School in the small coastal community of Moeraki. She won a scholarship for secondary school tuition and studied at Te Waipounamu Maori Girls' School, where she was head girl in her final year. She then studied at Christchurch Teachers' College and completed primary school teacher training. Leonard-Higgins initially taught in the North Island at Te Puke, Te Whaiti and Murupara.

In 1950 she married Thomas Higgins and returned to Moeraki, where she had three children. In her role of elder at Moeraki Marae, Leonard-Higgins cared for the church on the marae, hosted visitors and provided guidance and advice to the community. She also continued to teach at the local primary school.
