= Samuela Vula =

Fijian footballer

Personal information
- Full name: Samuela Vuluma Vula
- Date of birth: 22 August 1984 (age 42)
- Place of birth: Fiji
- Position: Defender

Senior career*
Years	Team	Apps	(Gls)
2007–2009	Rewa		
2009–2010	Lautoka		
2011–2014	Suva		

International career
2007–2012	Fiji	10	(0)
Medal record
Men's football
Representing Fiji
OFC Nations Cup
Third place	2008 Oceania
OFC U-20 Championship
Runner-up	2002 Fiji/Vanuatu
Pacific Games
Silver medal – second place	2007 Samoa
- * Club domestic league appearances and goals

Samuela Vuluma Vula (born 22 August 1984) is a Fijian former footballer who played as a defender. He played for Fijian clubs including Rewa, Lautoka, Suva and Labasa. He also won seven caps for the Fiji national team.

== Club career ==
In 2009, Vula represented Lautoka F.C., while also serving as a military officer.

In 2012, Vula earned several awards in a successful season playing for Suva. He was the player of the tournament in both the Fiji FACT and Courts IDC competitions. Following these awards, he was voted men's player of the year by the Fiji Football Association. In October of that year, Vula stated he intended to remain with Suva for the remainder of his career.

In 2013, Vula was banned for five years and fined $5,000 for indiscipline during the 2013 edition of the Fiji FACT. He was accused of having verbally abused his own club's management team, as well as damaging property at the team base camp.

Vula signed for Labasa in 2014 for a fee of around $2,000.

After a period away on peacekeeping duties with the military, he was back playing for Suva in 2016.

== Career statistics ==
=== International ===
Appearances and goals by national team and year
National team	Year	Apps	Goals
Fiji	2007	6	0
Fiji	2008	1	0
Fiji	2009	–	
Fiji	2010	–	
Fiji	2011	–	
Fiji	2012	3	0
Total		10	0

== Honours ==
Fiji

- OFC Nations Cup: 3rd place, 2008
- Pacific Games: Silver Medalist, 2007

Fiji U20

- OFC U-20 Championship: Runner-Up, 2002
