= Alick Maemae =

Solomon Island footballer

Personal information
- Full name: Alick Leonard Maemae
- Date of birth: 10 December 1985 (age 40)
- Place of birth: Suraina, Malaita, Solomon Islands
- Height: 1.65 m (5 ft 5 in)
- Position: Midfielder

Team information
- Current team: Amicale F.C.

Senior career*
Years	Team	Apps	(Gls)
2001–2003	Fawkner-Whittlesea Blues		
2003–2004	Koloale		
2004–2005	JP Su'uria		
2005–2007	YoungHeart Manawatu	20	(7)
2007	Richmond Athletic		
2007–2008	Makuru		
2009	Auckland City FC	2	(0)
2009	YoungHeart Manawatu	9	(0)
2009–2010	Hekari United		
2010–2014	Amicale		
2015–2018	Henderson Eels		
2020–	Isabel United		

International career^{‡}
2005	Solomon Islands U-20	5	(5)
2004–2007	Solomon Islands	19	(6)
Medal record
Men's football
Representing Solomon Islands
OFC Nations Cup
Runner-up	2004 Australia
- * Club domestic league appearances and goals as of 12 April 2009 ‡ National team caps and goals as of 31 January 2008

Alick Leonard Maemae (born 10 December 1985) is a football midfielder from the Solomon Islands.

He hails from Suraina, North East coast of Malaita.

== Club career ==
He played soccer at a very early age. His interest in soccer forced him to abandon secondary education back at his home village at Manasu'u. Inspired by the first Solomon Islands professional soccer player, Batram Suri who is his very close relative, Maemae went to Honiara and started playing for Koloale FC. At Honiara, he started to gain popularity.

Maemae has played for NZFC outfit YoungHeart Manawatu, where he was joined by his compatriot Nelson Sale Kilifa. Other former clubs include Richmond Athletic, Koloale FC Honiara and Fawkner-Whittlesea Blues in Australia's Victorian Premier League.

In May 2010, he won the Oceania Champions League with Hekari United. In September that year he followed his teammate and compatriot Stanley Waita to Amical FC.

== International career ==
He made his debut for the Solomon Islands national football team in 2004 against Vanuatu and collected 19 caps, scoring 5 goals.

== Honours ==
Hekari United

- Oceania Champions League: 2009–10

Solomon Islands

- OFC Nations Cup: Runner-up, 2004
