= Ramon Gjamaci =

New Caledonian footballer

Ramon Gjamaci is a footballer for New Caledonia. He played in the 2008 OFC Nations Cup.
