= Thomson Park (Fiji) =

Coordinates: 18°13′25.78″S 178°10′4.07″E

Thomson Park is a multi-use sports stadium in Navua District, Fiji. It has a capacity of 1,000 and is currently used by local association football club Navua F.C. for their home matches.

In March 2011, the Fiji FA ruled that no further league games could be held at the stadium until a fence perimeter had been installed for player safety.

Thomson Park hosted international football matches on Wednesday, 16 August 2011 when Fiji played Samoa. The two countries' women's teams also played each other. Fiji men won 3-0 and their women's team won 2-0.
