= 2002 OFC U-20 Championship =

Championnat d'Océanie de football des moins de 20 ans 2002

Tournament details
- Host country: Fiji; Vanuatu
- Dates: 7–22 December
- Teams: 8 (from 1 confederation)
- Venues: 2 (in 2 host cities)

Final positions
- Champions: Australia (11th title)
- Runners-up: Fiji
- Third place: New Zealand
- Fourth place: New Caledonia

Tournament statistics
- Matches played: 15
- Goals scored: 80 (5.33 per match)
- Top scorer: (Australia) Scott McDonald (7 goals)

The 2002 OFC U-20 Qualifying Tournament was held in Fiji and Vanuatu from December 7 to December 22, 2002 to determine the entrant into the 2003 FIFA U-20 World Cup. The match schedule was revised following the late withdrawal of the Cook Islands from Group A.

== Participating teams ==
- Fiji
- Vanuatu
- New Zealand
- New Caledonia
- Australia
- Papua New Guinea
- Samoa
- Tonga

== Referees ==
New Zealand

- (New Zealand) Derek Rugg
- (New Zealand) Ken Wallace

Papua New Guinea

- (Papua New Guinea) Job Minan
- (Papua New Guinea) Gidas Bayung

Fiji

- (Fiji) Leone Rakaroi

Australia

- (Australia) Con Diomis
- (Australia) Doug Rennie

Vanuatu

- (Vanuatu) Ron Wilbur
- (Vanuatu) Harry Atisson

Tahiti

- (French Polynesia) Charles Ariiotima

== Matches ==
=== Group A ===
Team	Pts	Pld	W	D	L	GF	GA	GDF
Australia	6	2	2	0	0	8	0	+8
Vanuatu	1	2	0	1	1	2	4	–2
Papua New Guinea	1	2	0	1	1	2	8	–6

7 December 2002
14:30 UTC+11

Vanuatu	0–2	Australia
	Report; Summary	McDonald 10'; Valeri 22'

Korman Stadium, Port Vila

9 December 2002
14:30 UTC+11

Australia	6–0	Papua New Guinea
Lepani 10' (o.g.); McDonald 38', 56', 58'; Lia 76'; Brosque 89'	Report; Summary

Korman Stadium, Port Vila

11 December 2002
14:30 UTC+11

Papua New Guinea	2–2	Vanuatu
Davani 13'; Mesak 62'		Salai 17'; Waiwai 60'

Korman Stadium, Port Vila

=== Group B ===
Team	Pts	Pld	W	D	L	GF	GA	GDF
Fiji	12	4	4	0	0	14	1	+13
New Zealand	9	4	3	0	1	17	2	+15
New Caledonia	6	4	2	0	2	12	10	+2
Samoa	3	4	1	0	3	6	12	–6
Tonga	0	4	0	0	4	4	28	–24

8 December 2002
14:00 UTC+12

Fiji	8–1	Tonga
Wise 13'; Vidovi 39'; Rokobici 47', 50', 52'; Kumar 61', 73', 76'	Summary	Papani 59'

Govind Park, Ba

8 December 2002
16:00 UTC+12

New Zealand	8–0	New Caledonia
McGarrison 8'; Brydon 32', 58', 90+1', 90+2'; Fisher 34'; McKenzie 49', 78'	Summary

Govind Park, Ba

10 December 2002
14:00 UTC+12

New Zealand	2–1	Samoa
Strom 78'; McGarrison 84'	Summary	Faaiuaso 6'

Govind Park, Ba

10 December 2002
16:00 UTC+12

Fiji	1–0	New Caledonia
Dau 19'	Summary

Govind Park, Ba

12 December 2002
14:00 UTC+12

Samoa	0–4	New Caledonia
	Summary	Wahopie 14', 51', 90+5'; Wanakaija 81'

Govind Park, Ba

12 December 2002
16:00 UTC+12

New Zealand	7–0	Tonga
Rooker 9'; Fisher 15'; Hogg 18', 49'; Adams 39'; Boyens 44'; Smith 70'	Summary

Govind Park, Ba

14 December 2002
14:00 UTC+12

Fiji	1–0	New Zealand
Vakatalesau 68'	Summary

Govind Park, Ba

14 December 2002
16:00 UTC+12

Tonga	2–5	Samoa
Vaitaki 14'; Nafe 40'	Summary	Timo 13'; Duffy 15'; Alofa 65'; Hellesoe 88'; Slade 90+2'

Govind Park, Ba

16 December 2002
14:00 UTC+12

New Caledonia	8–1	Tonga
Wanakaija 25', 30'; Wahopie 50', 82'; Mapone 77'; Toto 85'; Kahlemu 86'; Selefen 87'	Summary	Nafe 44'

Govind Park, Ba

16 December 2002
16:00 UTC+12

Samoa	0–4	Fiji
	Summary	Rokobici 5', 43'; Kumar 46'; Kumar 89'

Govind Park, Ba

=== Final ===
1st Leg

21 December 2002
13:30 AEST

Australia	11–0	Fiji
Wells 12'; Baird 13', 14', 78', 85'; McDonald 25'; Tarka 27'; Brosque 50', 80'; Lia 68'; Parisi 76'	Report; Summary

Bob Jane Stadium, Melbourne
Referee: (French Polynesia) Charles Ariiotima

2nd Leg

23 December 2002
14:30 UTC+12

Fiji	0–4	Australia
	Report; Summary	McDonald 11', 87'; Parisi 21'; McKay 85'

Govind Park, Ba
Attendance: 1,000
Referee: (New Zealand) Derek Rugg

Australia win 15-0 on aggregate.

== Winners ==
2002 OFC U-20 Championship winners

Australia
Eleventh title

Australia qualified for the 2003 FIFA U-20 World Cup.

== Goalscorers ==
There were 65 goals scored during the tournament, not including the 1 own goal scored.

7 goals

- (Australia) Scott McDonald

5 goals

- (New Caledonia) Patrick Wahopie
- (Fiji) Isoa Rokobici

4 goals

- (Australia) Michael Baird
- (New Zealand) Mitchell Brydon
- (Fiji) Roderick Kumar

3 goals

- (Australia) Alex Brosque
- (New Caledonia) Leopold Wanakaija

2 goals

- (Australia) Franco Parsi
- (Australia) Vince Lia
- (Tonga) Teukihakausiu Nafe
- (New Zealand) Morgan Mcgarrison
- (New Zealand) Stuart Hogg
- (New Zealand) Ross Mckenzie
- (New Zealand) Brent Fisher

1 goal

- (Papua New Guinea) Alex Davani
- (Papua New Guinea) Ricky Mesak
- (Vanuatu) James Salai
- (Vanuatu) Roger Waiwai
- (Australia) Carl Valeri
- (Australia) David Tarka
- (Australia) Matt McKay
- (Australia) Dustin Wells
- (Tonga) Master Papani
- (Tonga) Viliami Vaitaki
- (New Zealand) Andy Boyens
- (New Zealand) Nathan Strom
- (New Zealand) Matthew Adams
- (New Zealand) Jarrod Smith
- (New Zealand) Wayen Rooker
- (Samoa) Kiwi Timo
- (Samoa) Alofa Alatise
- (Samoa) Kevin Duffy
- (Samoa) Desmond Faaiuaso
- (Samoa) Robert Hellesoe
- (Samoa) Junior Slade
- (New Caledonia) Fabrice Toto
- (New Caledonia) Henri Selefen
- (New Caledonia) Kevin Kahlemu
- (New Caledonia) Josue Mapone
- (Fiji) Luke Vidovi
- (Fiji) Robert Wise
- (Fiji) Ronil Kumar
- (Fiji) Lorima Dau
- (Fiji) Osea Vakatalesau
