= Battle of the Giants (Fiji) =

Football Tournament In Fiji

- Organiser(s): Oceania Football Confederation
- Founded: 1978; 48 years ago
- Region: Oceania
- Current champions: Ba F.C. (18th title) (2026)
- Most championships: Ba F.C. (18 titles)
- Broadcaster: MAI TV
- 2026 Battle of the Giants

The Battle of the Giants (BoG) is a football competition held yearly under the auspices of the Fiji Football Association, in which the top district teams take part.

The competition, which started in 1978, was due to the foresight of J.D. Maharaj, who saw it as a way of earning money for cash starved football associations in Fiji. This was the first time that a football competition in Fiji was sponsored by businesses. The competition has been held every year except 1987, when restrictions were placed by the military government.

== Nature of tournament ==
The top 10 district teams take part in the tournament. At present these teams are Ba F.C., Labasa F.C., Lautoka F.C., Nadi F.C., Nadroga, Nasinu, Navua, Rewa, Suva and Tavua. The teams are divided into two pools of five and each team plays all the other teams once, over three days. A win is worth three points, a draw one point and a loss no points. The top two teams in each pool qualify for the semi-finals, with the winner of each pool playing the runner-up of the other pool. The semi-finals and the final are played on different days.

== Champions ==
Year	Venue	Winner	Runner-up	Score	Notes
1978	Ba	Nadi	Ba	1 - 0	-
1979	Lautoka	Ba	Rewa	4 - 2	Penalty kicks
1980	Ba	Nadi	Ba	3 - 0	-
1981	Lautoka	Ba	Lautoka	2 - 0	-
1982	Suva	Suva	Ba	-	Match awarded to Suva
1983	Nadi	Nadi	Lautoka	1 - 0	-
1984	Ba	Ba	Suva	1 - 0	-
1985	Suva	Lautoka	Rewa	3 - 0	-
1986	Nadi	Nadi	Labasa	1 - 0	-
1987	-	-	-	-	No competition due to coup
1988	Nadi	Suva	Ba	4 - 3	Penalty kicks
1989	Rewa	Nadroga	Nasinu	1 - 0	-
1990	Ba	Ba	Suva	5 - 4	Peanlity kicks
1991	Rewa	Nadroga	Nasinu	5 - 4	Penalty kicks
1992	Lautoka	Ba	Lautoka	1 - 0	-
1993	Rewa	Ba	Labasa	1 - 0	-
1994	Nadi	Rewa	Ba	-	Ba defaulted the Replay under Protest
1995	Suva	Suva	Navua	2 - 1	-
1996	Ba	Nadi	Tavua	3 - 1	-
1997	Labasa	Labasa	Nadi	1 - 0	-
1998	Nadi	Ba	Nadi	1 - 0	-
1999	Lautoka	Ba	Tavua	1 - 0	-
2000	Lautoka	Ba	Labasa	2 - 0	-
2001	Nadi	Ba	Lautoka	2 - 0	-
2002	Labasa	Nadroga	Labasa	2 - 1	-
2003	Lautoka	Rewa	Ba	1 - 0	-
2004	Ba	Rewa	Nadi	2 - 0	-
2005	Suva	Navua	Rewa	1-0	-
2006	Nadi	Ba	Suva	2 - 1	-
2007	Rewa	Ba	Nadi	3 - 1	Extra-Time
2008	Suva	Ba	Labasa	2 - 1	-
2009	Lautoka	Ba	Lautoka	1 - 0	-
2010	Nadi	Rewa	Navua	1 - 0	-
2011	Rewa	Rewa	Suva	4 - 3	Penalty kicks
2012	Lautoka	Ba	Labasa	4 - 2	Penalty kicks
2013	Ba	Ba	Lautoka	3 - 1	-
2014	Suva	Rewa	Lautoka	2 - 1	-
2015	Nausori	Rewa	Ba	2 - 0	-
2016	Nausori	Lautoka	Labasa	2 - 0	Extra-Time
2017	Lautoka	Rewa	Nadi	2 - 1	-
2018	Lautoka	Ba	Suva	2 - 0	Extra-Time
2019	Lautoka	Labasa	Lautoka	1 - 0	-
2020	Lautoka	Rewa	Suva	1 - 0	-
2021	-	-	-	-	No competition due to COVID19
2022	Lautoka	Labasa	Rewa	2 - 1	-
2023	Suva	Labasa	Navua	2 - 1	-
2024	Suva	Lautoka	Nadi	2 - 0	-
2025	Labasa	Labasa	Rewa	2-1	
2026	Ba	Ba	Rewa	2-1	

== Most successful teams ==
Team	Number of Wins	Number of times runner-up
Ba F.C.	18	7
Rewa F.C.	9	4
Labasa F.C.	5	7
Nadi F.C.	5	6
Suva F.C.	3	6
Nadroga F.C.	3	0
Lautoka F.C.	3	8
Navua F.C.	1	3
Nasinu F.C.	0	2
Tavua F.C.	0	2
