= AS Témala Ouélisse =

- Full name: L'Association sportive Témala Ouélisse
- Ground: Stade Pomemie; Témala, New Caledonia
- Capacity: 1,000
- League: New Caledonia Division Honneur
- 2007–2008: 6th
Home colours

AS Témala Ouélisse is a New Caledonian football team playing at the top level. It is based in Témala.
