= PMRL Stadium =

Football stadium in Port Moresby, Papua New Guinea

- Interactive map of PMRL Stadium
- Full name: PMRL Stadium
- Location: Port Moresby, Papua New Guinea
- Coordinates: 9°28′09″S 147°11′54″E
- Capacity: 15,000

Tenant
- Hekari United FC (2010–2011)

PMRL Stadium is a football stadium in Port Moresby, Papua New Guinea. It is used mainly for football and hosts the home matches of PRK Hekari United of the Papua New Guinea National Soccer League and OFC Champions League. The stadium has a seating capacity of 15,000 spectators.
