= 2008 OFC Nations Cup =

Tournament details
- Dates: 17 October 2007 – 19 November 2008
- Teams: 4 (from 1 confederation)
- Venues: 5 (in 5 host cities)

Final positions
- Champions: New Zealand (4th title)
- Runners-up: New Caledonia
- Third place: Fiji
- Fourth place: Vanuatu

Tournament statistics
- Matches played: 12
- Goals scored: 39 (3.25 per match)
- Attendance: 44,989 (3,749 per match)
- Top scorer(s): (New Zealand) Shane Smeltz (8 goals)

The 2008 OFC Nations Cup was the eighth edition of the OFC Nations Cup and the first under a new format. It took place as a series of as a home-and-away round-robin tournament on FIFA match dates in 2007 and 2008. Doubling as the qualification tournament for the 2010 FIFA World Cup, the tournament was substantially different from earlier editions: 2004 champions Australia did not compete after leaving the Oceania Football Confederation for the Asian Football Confederation and for the first time since the 1996 OFC Nations Cup, no fixed venue was used. Unlike the 2004 OFC Nations Cup, which had featured six teams from the Oceania Football Confederation, the 2008 tournament had just four.

The cup was won by New Zealand, who as a result qualified for the 2009 FIFA Confederations Cup in South Africa and the World Cup qualifying play-off with the Asian 5th-placed team, Bahrain, in which New Zealand were successful.

== Qualification ==
Group A
Team	Pld	Pts
Fiji	4	10
New Caledonia	4	10
Tahiti	4	4
Cook Islands	4	3
Tuvalu	4	1

Semi-finals
Solomon Islands	2
New Caledonia	3
Fiji	3
Vanuatu	0

Final
New Caledonia	1
Fiji	0
Third place match
Solomon Islands	0
Vanuatu	2

Group B
Team	Pld	Pts
Solomon Islands	4	12
Vanuatu	4	9
Samoa	4	6
Tonga	4	3
American Samoa	4	0

Semi-finals
Solomon Islands	2
New Caledonia	3
Fiji	3
Vanuatu	0

Final
New Caledonia	1
Fiji	0
Third place match
Solomon Islands	0
Vanuatu	2

=== Qualified teams ===
Team	Qualified as
New Zealand	Automatically qualified
New Caledonia	gold medalists at the 2007 South Pacific Games
Fiji	silver medalists at the 2007 South Pacific Games
Vanuatu	bronze medalists at the 2007 South Pacific Games

== Squads ==
See 2008 OFC Nations Cup squads

== Final tournament ==
Pos	Team	Pld	W	D	L	GF	GA	GD	Pts	Qualification	(New Zealand)	(New Caledonia)	(Fiji)	(Vanuatu)
1	New Zealand (C)	6	5	0	1	14	5	+9	15	Advance to inter-confederation play-offs	—	3–0	0–2	4–1
2	New Caledonia	6	2	2	2	12	10	+2	8		1–3	—	4–0	3–0
3	Fiji	6	2	1	3	8	11	−3	7		0–2	3–3	—	2–0
4	Vanuatu	6	1	1	4	5	13	−8	4		1–2	1–1	2–1	—

Legend: Blue = home team win; Yellow = draw; Red = away team win.
(C) Champions

=== Results ===
17 October 2007
16:00 UTC+12

Fiji	0–2	New Zealand
	Report	Vicelich 37'; Smeltz 86'

Churchill Park, Lautoka
Attendance: 6,000
Referee: Jair Marrufo (USA)

17 November 2007
14:00 UTC+11

Vanuatu	1–2	New Zealand
Naprapol 32'	Report	Smeltz 53'; Mulligan 90+3'

Korman Stadium, Port Vila
Attendance: 8,000
Referee: Job Minan (Papua New Guinea)
17 November 2007
15:00 UTC+12

Fiji	3–3	New Caledonia
Nawatu 2'; Vakatalesau 27', 86'	Report	Gjamaci 66'; Kaudre 83'; M. Hmaé 87'

Govind Park, Ba
Attendance: 1,500
Referee: Peter O'Leary (New Zealand)

21 November 2007
19:00 UTC+13

New Zealand	4–1	Vanuatu
Mulligan 17', 81'; Smeltz 29' (pen.), 34'	Report	Sakama 50'

Westpac Stadium, Wellington
Attendance: 2,500
Referee: Averii Jacques (Tahiti)
21 November 2007
19:00 UTC+11

New Caledonia	4–0	Fiji
Wajoka 29' (pen.); M. Hmaé 32', 61'; Mapou 64'	Report

Stade Numa-Daly Magenta, Noumea
Attendance: 1,000
Referee: Matthew Breeze (Australia)

14 June 2008
14:00 UTC+11

Vanuatu	1–1	New Caledonia
Mermer 77'	Report	Djamali 73'

Korman Stadium, Port Vila
Attendance: 4,000
Referee: Rakesh Varman (Fiji)

21 June 2008
15:00 UTC+11

New Caledonia	3–0	Vanuatu
Wajoka 36'; M. Hmaé 60'; Diaike 87'	Report

Stade Numa-Daly Magenta, Noumea
Attendance: 2,700
Referee: Michael Hester (New Zealand)

6 September 2008
15:00 UTC+12

Fiji	2–0	Vanuatu
Kumar 7'; Dunadamu 87'	Report

Govind Park, Ba
Attendance: 3,000
Referee: Job Minan (Papua New Guinea)
6 September 2008
17:00 UTC+11

New Caledonia	1–3	New Zealand
M. Hmaé 55'	Report	Sigmund 16'; Smeltz 65', 75'

Stade Numa-Daly Magenta, Noumea
Attendance: 2,589
Referee: Rakesh Varman (Fiji)

10 September 2008
14:00 UTC+11

Vanuatu	2–1	Fiji
Sakama 59'; Malas 90+2'	Report	Dunadamu 90+3'

Korman Stadium, Port Vila
Attendance: 1,200
Referee: Peter O'Leary (New Zealand)
10 September 2008
19:30 UTC+12

New Zealand	3–0	New Caledonia
Smeltz 49', 76'; Christie 69'	Report

North Harbour Stadium, Auckland
Attendance: 8,000
Referee: Norbert Hauata (Tahiti)

19 November 2008
18:00 UTC+12

New Zealand	0–2	Fiji
	Report	Krishna 63', 90'

Churchill Park, Lautoka (Fiji)
(Note: The New Zealand vs Fiji match was originally scheduled for 13 October 2007, but was postponed by FIFA after Fijian goalkeeper Simione Tamanisau was denied a visa by the New Zealand immigration authorities. The match was first rescheduled to be played in the neutral country of Samoa, but subsequently moved again to Fiji.)
Attendance: 4,500
Referee: Lencie Fred (Vanuatu)

== Goalscorers ==
There were 39 goals scored in 12 matches, for an average of 3.25 goals per match.

8 goals

- (New Zealand) Shane Smeltz

5 goals

- (New Caledonia) Michel Hmaé

3 goals

- (New Zealand) David Mulligan

2 goals

- (Fiji) Maciu Dunadamu
- (Fiji) Roy Krishna
- (Fiji) Osea Vakatalesau
- (New Caledonia) Pierre Wajoka
- (Vanuatu) Francois Sakama

1 goal

- (Fiji) Salesh Kumar
- (Fiji) Valerio Nawatu
- (New Caledonia) Patrick Diaike
- (New Caledonia) Ramon Djamali
- (New Caledonia) Ramon Gjamaci
- (New Caledonia) Mael Kaudre
- (New Caledonia) Marius Mapou
- (New Zealand) Jeremy Christie
- (New Zealand) Ben Sigmund
- (New Zealand) Ivan Vicelich
- (Vanuatu) Derek Malas
- (Vanuatu) Etienne Mermer
- (Vanuatu) Jean Nako Naprapol
