= Vatukoula F.C. =

Fijian football club

Vatukoula Football Association
- Full name: Vatukoula Football Association
- Founded: 1979
- President: Joseph Anthony
- Manager: Barma Nand
Home colours

Vatukoula FA was a Fijian football team playing in the second division of the Fiji Football Association competitions. It is based on the island of Viti Levu.

Their uniform includes orange shirt with white.

== History ==
The Vodafone Vatukoula Football Association was formed in 1979, under the presidency of Umesh Chandra.

== De-registered ==
On 25 May 2017, Vatukoula Football Association was de-registered as an affiliated member of the Fiji Football Association, as a result of compliance issues relating to club competitions and poor performances, as the club was thrashed 29-nil by Tailevu Naitasiri F.C. in a Vodafone Senior League match, players who hold Vatukoula district licence were allowed to play for Tavua F.C. as Vatukoula and Tavua become one district.

== See also ==
- Fiji Football Association

== Bibliography ==
- M. Prasad, Sixty Years of Soccer in Fiji 1938 – 1998: The Official History of the Fiji Football Association, Fiji Football Association, Suva, 1998.
