= Ramon Djamali =

New Caledonian footballer (born 1975)

Personal information
- Full name: Ramon Djamali
- Date of birth: 12 June 1975 (age 51)
- Place of birth: New Caledonia
- Position: Striker

Senior career*
Years	Team	Apps	(Gls)
2000–2002	AS Vénus	16	(14)
2002–2007	AS Manu-Ura	48	(34)
2007–2011	AS Mont-Dore	41	(29)

International career^{‡}
2003–2008	New Caledonia	17	(6)
Medal record
Men's football
Representing New Caledonia
OFC Nations Cup
Runner-up	2008 Oceania
Pacific Games
Silver medal – second place	2003 Fiji
- * Club domestic league appearances and goals as of 15 November 2011 ‡ National team caps and goals as of 15 November 2007

Ramon Djamali (born 12 June 1975) is a footballer who currently plays for AS Mont-Dore in the New Caledonian football league. He has been playing as a striker.

He has also played in the Tahitian league for AS Manu Ura.

He made his debut for the New Caledonia national football team in a South Pacific Games match against Papua New Guinea with a goal and scored two more in the tournament.

== Honours ==
New Caledonia

- OFC Nations Cup: Runner-up, 2008
- Pacific Games: Silver Medalist, 2003
