= Jean-Yves Li Waut =

Tahitian footballer (born 1978)

Personal information
- Full name: Jean-Yves Li Waut Ut
- Date of birth: 2 July 1978 (age 48)
- Place of birth: Tahiti
- Position: Defender

Senior career*
Years	Team	Apps	(Gls)
2003–2005	AS Manu-Ura		
2005–2006	A.S. Pirae		
2006–2012	AS Manu-Ura		

International career^{‡}
2004–2011	Tahiti	12	(0)
- * Club domestic league appearances and goals as of 12 June 2018 ‡ National team caps and goals as of 13 January 2012

Jean-Yves Li Waut (born 2 July 1978) in Tahiti is a footballer who plays as a defender. He currently plays for AS Manu-Ura in the Tahiti Division Fédérale and the Tahiti national football team.
