= Te Mārama =

Te Mārama was most likely a Māori woman possibly from one of the Muriwhenua iwi (tribes) in northern New Zealand.

Te Mārama signed the Treaty of Waitangi on an unknown date, but it was probably in the Bay of Islands. She was one of a select few of Māori women who signed the treaty.
