= Joachim Waroi =

Personal information
- Date of birth: September 20, 1988 (age 38)
- Place of birth: Tarapaina, Solomon Islands
- Height: 1.76 m (5 ft 9 in)
- Position: Forward

Team information
- Current team: Marist
- Number: 2

Senior career*
Years	Team	Apps	(Gls)
–2008	Marist		
2008–2010	Hekari United		
2010–2011	Marist		
2011–2013	Amicale		
2013–2015	Hekari United		
2015–2016	FC Guadalcanal		
2016	Lae City Dwellers FC		
2016–2017	Western United		
2017–2018	Marist		
2018–	Western United		

International career^{‡}
2011–	Solomon Islands	12	(0)
- * Club domestic league appearances and goals ‡ National team caps and goals as of 24 September 2017

Joachim Waroi (born September 20, 1988) is an association football attacker from the Solomon Islands who plays for Western United and the Solomon Islands national football team.

== Club career ==
He is a Solomon Islands international.

He played for Hekari United.

Signed for Lae City Dwellers FC in 2016 for an anonymous fee to enhance their attacking options. He helped them qualify for the OFC Champions League for the first time.

Former Hekari United forward was given a one-match ban when celebrating a goal scored against his former club in an impudent manner by taking his jersey off and covering his head with it while running around which did not conform to the guidelines.

In 2019, he signed for Labasa F.C.
