= Manav Permal =

Fijian footballer

Personal information
- Full name: Manav Prashant Permal
- Date of birth: 27 November 1999 (age 26)
- Place of birth: Wainividoi, Navua, Fiji
- Positions: Midfielder; forward

Team information
- Current team: Navua

Youth career
- Vashist Muni College
- Navua

Senior career*
Years	Team	Apps	(Gls)
2017	Navua		
2017–2019	Suva		
2020–	Navua		

International career^{‡}
2018	Fiji U20	2	(0)
2017–	Fiji	1	(0)
- * Club domestic league appearances and goals as of 13 June 2017 ‡ National team caps and goals as of 13 June 2017

Manav Permal, also written as Mannav (born 27 November 1999) is a Fijian footballer who plays either as a midfielder or as a forward for Navua in the Fiji Premier League.

== Club career ==
Permal started playing for his college team Vashist Muni College. After performing well he joined the youth team of Navua. In 2017 he made his debut for their first team. In September 2017 he moved to Suva. He later returned to Navua and played for the club at the 2020 Fiji FA Cup Tournament.

== International career ==
Permal had just made his debut for Navua when he was called up by the head coach of the Fiji national football team: Christophe Gamel. He made his debut for Fiji on 25 May 2017 in a 1–1 draw against the Solomon Islands. He came in as a substitute for Setareki Hughes in the 90 minute.
