= Farahia Teuiria =

Tahitian footballer (born 1972)

Personal information
- Full name: Farahia Teuiria
- Date of birth: 29 August 1972 (age 54)
- Place of birth: Tahiti
- Position: Midfielder

Senior career*
Years	Team	Apps	(Gls)
1994–2007	AS Vaiete		
2007–2010	AS Tiaré		

International career^{‡}
1995–2007	Tahiti	13	(0)
- * Club domestic league appearances and goals as of 29 April 2020 ‡ National team caps and goals as of 29 April 2020

Farahia Teuiria (born 29 August 1972) is a former Tahitian football player who primarily played as a midfielder. He previously played for AS Vaiete. And he also played for AS Tiaré in the Tahiti Division Fédérale as well as Tahiti national football team.

Over the course of his career, Teuiria earned 16 caps for his national team but did not score any goals. He notably participated in World Cup qualifiers and the OFC Nations Cup.

His career spanned from the mid-1990s, with his international debut in 1995, until his retirement in 2010.
