= Meli Codro =

Fijian footballer

Personal information
- Full name: Meli Codro
- Date of birth: August 18, 1985 (age 41)
- Place of birth: Fiji
- Position: Midfielder

Team information
- Current team: Suva F.C.

Senior career*
| Years | Team | Apps | (Gls) |
| 2008–2018 | Ba | | |
| 2018– | Suva F.C. | | (4) |

International career^{‡}
| 2016– | Fiji | 1 | (0) |
- * Club domestic league appearances and goals as of 15 October ‡ National team caps and goals as of 15 October 2017

Meli Codro is a Fijian footballer who plays as a midfielder. for Suva F.C.

== International career ==
Codro made his debut for the Fiji national football team in a 1-1 draw against Malaysia on 27 June 2016.
