= Peniame Drova =

Fijian footballer

Personal information
- Date of birth: 15 October 1990 (age 36)
- Place of birth: Fiji
- Position: Defender

Team information
- Current team: Rewa
- Number: 2

Senior career*
Years	Team	Apps	(Gls)
2010–	Rewa		

International career^{‡}
2012	Fiji U23	4	(0)
2011–	Fiji	3	(0)
- * Club domestic league appearances and goals as of 25 March 2017 ‡ National team caps and goals as of 25 March 2017

Peniame Drova (born 15 October 1990) is a Fijian footballer who plays as a defender for Rewa in the Fijian National Football League.
