= Mael Kaudre =

New Caledonian footballer

Mael Kaudre is a footballer who played attack for the New Caledonia national football team. He scored a goal against the Fiji national football team in Ba, Fiji during the Oceania world cup qualifier. He also played in the 2008 OFC Nations Cup.

He played attack for Noumea-based A.S. Magenta, in the New Caledonia Division Honneur league, from 2006 through 2009.
