= Nikola Raoma =

Fijian footballer

Personal information
- Date of birth: February 3, 1977 (age 49)
- Place of birth: Nadi
- Position: Defender

Nikola Raoma (born February 3, 1977) is a Fijian soccer player. He was selected for the Fiji National Team, and played in the 2006 Germany World Cup qualifications in 2004 against Vanuatu, American Samoa and Papua New Guinea national teams.

Raoma played for Club Néo-zélandais from 2003 through to part of 2006. Raoma has been playing for Western Suburbs Sunshine soccer club in Australia since the 2006 season. Raoma was also part of the 2014 Nadi Soccer team that qualified for the regional clubs football competition.
