= Marius Mapou =

New Caledonian footballer (born 1980)

Personal information
- Full name: Marius Mapou
- Date of birth: 22 June 1980 (age 46)
- Place of birth: New Caledonia
- Position: Central midfielder

Youth career
- AS Mont-Dore

Senior career*
Years	Team	Apps	(Gls)
2001–2006	AS Mont-Dore	46	(18)
2006–2007	AS Magenta	10	(0)
2007–2011	AS Mont-Dore	34	(3)

International career^{‡}
2002–2008	New Caledonia	22	(3)
Medal record
Men's football
Representing New Caledonia
OFC Nations Cup
Runner-up	2008 Oceania
Pacific Games
Gold medal – first place	2007 Samoa
- * Club domestic league appearances and goals as of 17 September 2018 ‡ National team caps and goals as of 31 March 2018

Marius Mapou (born 22 June 1980) is an international footballer for New Caledonia. He played in the 2008 OFC Nations Cup.

== Honours ==
New Caledonia

- OFC Nations Cup: Runner-up, 2008
- Pacific Games: Gold Medalist, 2007
