= Ronil Kumar =

Fijian footballer and manager

Personal information
- Full name: Ronil Kumar
- Date of birth: 29 November 1984 (age 41)
- Place of birth: Rotuma, Fiji
- Height: 1.62 m (5 ft 4 in)
- Position: Midfielder

Senior career*
Years	Team	Apps	(Gls)
2006	Ba		
2007	Waitakere City		(1)
2008	Waitakere United	9	(0)
2008–2017	Ba	29	(1)

International career^{‡}
2007–2017	Fiji	11	(0)

Managerial career
- 2017–2020: Ba
Medal record
Men's football
Representing Fiji
OFC Nations Cup
Third place	2008 Oceania
OFC U-20 Championship
Runner-up	2002 Fiji/Vanuatu
Pacific Games
Silver medal – second place	2007 Samoa
- * Club domestic league appearances and goals as of 27 April 2013 ‡ National team caps and goals as of 14 April 2008

Ronil Kumar (born 29 November 1984) is a Fijian retired footballer and manager.

He played as a midfielder for Fiji national football team, Fijian team Ba F.C., New Zealand club Waitakere United, and for New Zealander Waitakere City.

== International career ==
Kumar made his debut for Fiji at the South Pacific Games 2007 and he has played for them in the 2010 FIFA World Cup qualification tournament.

== Personal life ==
Ronil is the brother of Salesh, also football international for Fiji.

== Honours ==
Fiji

- OFC Nations Cup: 3rd place, 2008
- Pacific Games: Silver Medalist, 2007

Fiji U20

- OFC U-20 Championship: Runner-Up, 2002
