= Pene Erenio =

Fijian footballer

Personal information
- Full name: Pene Erenio
- Date of birth: 20 January 1981 (age 45)
- Place of birth: Fiji
- Position: Midfielder

Team information
- Current team: Savusavu
- Number: 5

Senior career*
Years	Team	Apps	(Gls)
2003	Olympian Team		
2004–2010	Rewa		
2011–2016	Navua		
2016–	Savusavu		

International career^{‡}
2004–2011	Fiji	16	(0)
- * Club domestic league appearances and goals as of 24 January 2012 ‡ National team caps and goals as of 24 January 2012

Pene Erenio (born 20 January 1981) in Fiji is a footballer who plays as a midfielder. He currently plays for Savusavu in the Senior League (Second Tier) and the Fiji national football team.
