= Marama Amau =

Tahitian association football player (born 1991)

Personal information
- Full name: Heinui Marama Amau
- Date of birth: 13 January 1991 (age 35)
- Place of birth: Tahiti
- Height: 1.74 m (5 ft 9 in)
- Position: Defender

Team information
- Current team: A.S. Vénus
- Number: 7

Senior career*
Years	Team	Apps	(Gls)
2016–	A.S. Vénus		

International career^{‡}
2009	Tahiti U20	2	(0)
2017–	Tahiti	10	(0)
Medal record
Men's football
Representing Tahiti
OFC U-20 Championship
Winner	2008 Tahiti
Men's Beach soccer
Representing Tahiti
OFC Beach Soccer Nations Cup
Winner	2011 Tahiti
- * Club domestic league appearances and goals ‡ National team caps and goals as of 11 April 2021

Heinui Marama Amau (born 13 January 1991) is a Tahitian footballer who plays as a defender for A.S. Vénus and the Tahiti national football team.

== Career ==
=== International ===
Amau made his senior international debut on 23 March 2017, coming on as a 30th-minute substitute for Taumihau Tiatia in a 3-1 victory over Papua New Guinea during World Cup qualifying.

== Honours ==
Tahiti

- OFC Beach Soccer Nations Cup: 2011

Tahiti U20

- OFC U-20 Championship: 2008
