= Jean Nako Naprapol =

Vanuatuan footballer

Jean Nako Naprapol (born 20 July 1980 in Tanna) is an international footballer for Vanuatu. He played in the 2008 and 2012 OFC Nations Cup.

== International goals ==
No.	Date	Venue	Opponent	Score	Result	Competition
1.	1 June 2012	Lawson Tama Stadium, Honiara, Solomon Islands	New Caledonia	2–2	2–5	2012 OFC Nations Cup
2.	3 June 2012	Lawson Tama Stadium, Honiara, Solomon Islands	Samoa	1–0	5–0	2012 OFC Nations Cup
