= Valerio Nawatu =

Fijian footballer

Valerio Nawatu (born 24 July 1984) is a Fiji international footballer who plays as a forward and is registered with Papakura City FC. He is the leading goal scorer in the Lotto NRFL Div 2 competition with 24 goals. He represents NZ Nadi in the Fijian competition in NZ.

== Career statistics ==
=== International ===
Appearances and goals by national team and year
National team	Year	Apps	Goals
Fiji	2007	2	1
Total		2	1

Scores and results list Fiji's goal tally first, score column indicates score after each Nawatu goal.

List of international goals scored by Valerio Nawatu
No.	Date	Venue	Opponent	Score	Result	Competition
1	17 November 2007	Govind Park, Ba, Fiji	New Caledonia	1–0	3–3	2008 OFC Nations Cup
