= Amani Makoe =

Fijian footballer

Personal information
- Full name: Amani Makoe Valebalavu
- Date of birth: 20 February 1991 (age 35)
- Place of birth: Fiji
- Position: Defender

Team information
- Current team: Nadroga
- Number: 16

Senior career*
Years	Team	Apps	(Gls)
–2013	Labasa		
2013–2014	Nadi		
2014–2015	Amicale		
2015–2017	Rewa		
2017–2018	Labasa		
2018	Rewa		

International career^{‡}
2011	Fiji U-20	4	(0)
2012	Fiji U-23	2	(0)
2015–	Fiji	10	(0)
- * Club domestic league appearances and goals as of 30 November 2017 ‡ National team caps and goals as of 30 November 2017

Amani Makoe (born 20 February 1991) is a Fijian footballer who plays as a defender for Nadroga in the Fijian National Football League.
