= Lagi Dyer =

Fijian former international footballer

Personal information
- Date of birth: 16 April 1972 (age 54)
- Position: Striker

Senior career*
Years	Team	Apps	(Gls)
2004–2008	Rewa		

International career
2004–2008	Fiji	4	(0)
- * Club domestic league appearances and goals

Lagi Dyer (born 16 April 1972) is a Fijian former international footballer who played as a striker.

== Career ==
Dyer played club football for Rewa.

He made his international debut for Fiji in 2004, and appeared in FIFA World Cup qualifying matches.
