= Navua F.C. =

Association football club in Fiji

Navua
- Full name: Navua Football Club
- Founded: 1943; 83 years ago
- Ground: Thomson Park (Fiji); Navua, Fiji
- Capacity: 1,000
- Chairman: (Fiji) Faud Ali
- Manager: Shivneel Maharaj
- League: Fiji Premier League
- 2025: 4th

Navua F.C. is a Fijian football team playing in the Fiji Premier League (FPL), the top division men's professional football league in Fiji.

They are based in Navua, which is situated on the southern side of the main island of Viti Levu, between the town of Sigatoka and the city of Suva. Their home stadium is Thomson Park. Their uniform is red shirt, blue shorts and white socks.

== History ==
Navua F.C. was founded in 1943, with the formation of the Navua Soccer Association, under the leadership of C.P. Singh, a former member of the Legislative Council. The team languished in the second division has moved up to the first division, and has performed credibly in recent times.

== Achievements ==
- Fiji Senior League: 1

2019

- League Championship (for Districts):

Winner: 0
Runner-up: 1 (2005)

- Inter-District Championship:

Winner: 1 (2009)
Runner-up: 0

- Inter-District Championship - Second Division:

Winner: 2 (2018, 2019)
Runner-up: 0

- Battle of the Giants:

Winner: 1 (2005)
Runner-up: 1 (1995)

- Fiji Football Association Cup Tournament:

Winner: 3 (2003, 2008, 2009)
Runner-up: 2 (2004, 2010)

== See also ==
- Fiji Football Association

== Bibliography ==
- M. Prasad, Sixty Years of Soccer in Fiji 1938–1998: The Official History of the Fiji Football Association, Fiji Football Association, Suva, 1998.
