= 2010 FIFA World Cup qualification (AFC–OFC play-off) =

- Event: 2010 FIFA World Cup qualification
Bahrain	New Zealand
(Bahrain)	(New Zealand)
0	1
- New Zealand won 1–0 on aggregate

First leg
Bahrain	New Zealand
0	0
- Date: 10 October 2009
- Venue: Bahrain National Stadium, Riffa
- Referee: Viktor Kassai (Hungary)
- Weather: Clear; 29 °C (84 °F)

Second leg
New Zealand	Bahrain
1	0
- Date: 14 November 2009
- Venue: Westpac Stadium, Wellington
- Referee: Jorge Larrionda (Uruguay)
- Weather: Scattered clouds 13 °C (55 °F)

The 2010 FIFA World Cup AFC–OFC qualification play-off was a two-legged home-and-away tie between the winners of the Oceania qualifying tournament, New Zealand, and the fifth-placed team from the Asian qualifying tournament, Bahrain.

The games were played on 10 October and 14 November 2009 in Riffa and Wellington, respectively. With New Zealand winning 1–0 on aggregate to qualify for the FIFA World Cup for the first time since the 1982 tournament.

It was the second consecutive FIFA World Cup play-off for Bahrain, which lost 2–1 on aggregate to Trinidad and Tobago in their 2006 play-off.

New Zealand took part in their first FIFA World Cup inter-confederation play-off after years of Australia appearing in the inter-confederation play-offs of 1986 vs Scotland, 1994 (1st play-off vs Canada and 2nd play-off vs Argentina), 1998 vs Iran, 2002 vs Uruguay, and 2006 vs Uruguay, and Israel appearing in 1990 against Colombia.

The draw for the order in which the two matches would be played was held on 2 June 2009 during the FIFA Congress. New Zealand won 1–0 on aggregate and a second consecutive appearance for an OFC team in the FIFA World Cup.

== Venues ==
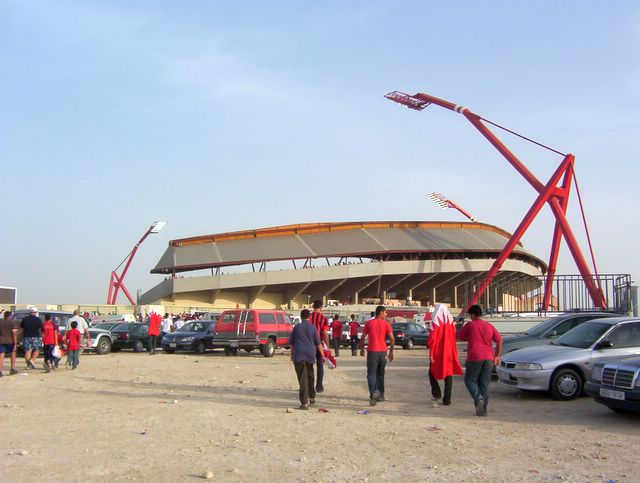
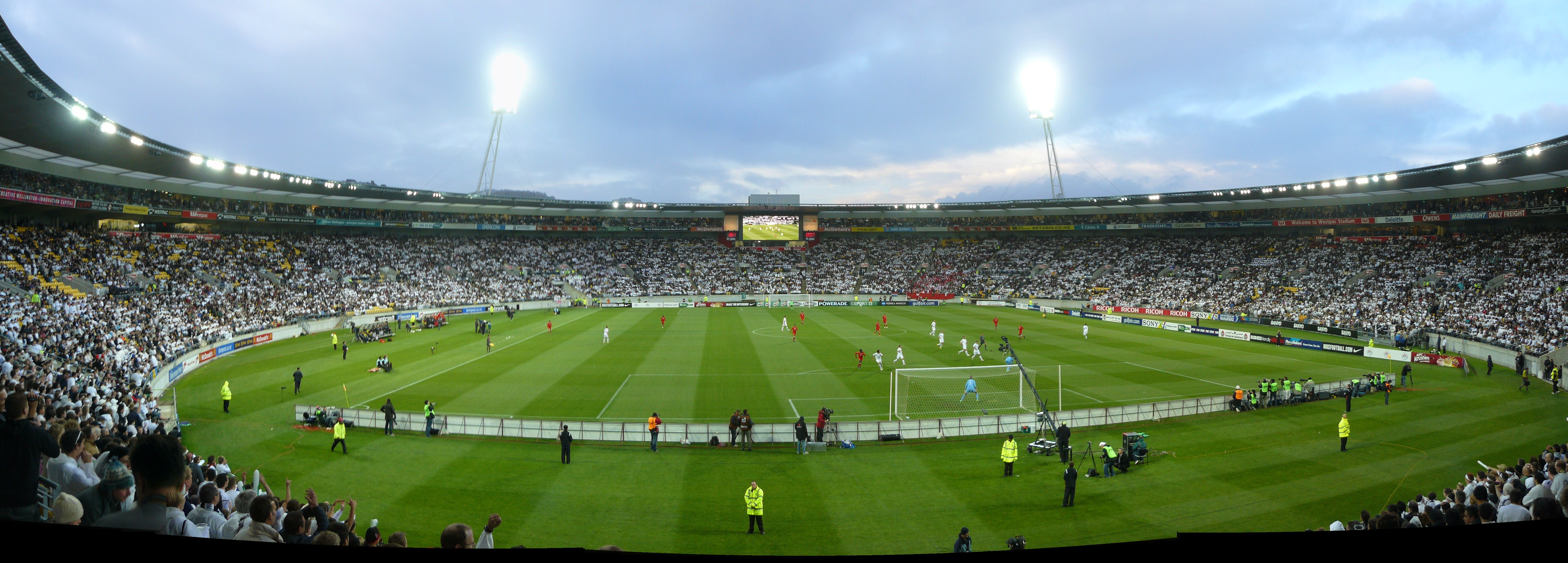
Bahrain National Stadium (left) and Westpac Stadium, venues for the series

== Background ==
Bahrain
Round
New Zealand

Team	Pld	W	D	L	GF	GA	GD	Pts
Australia	8	6	2	0	12	1	11	20
Japan	8	4	3	1	11	6	5	15
Bahrain	8	3	1	4	6	8	−2	10
Qatar	8	1	3	4	5	14	−9	6
Uzbekistan	8	1	1	6	5	10	−5	4

Final standings

Team	Pld	W	D	L	GF	GA	GD	Pts
New Zealand	6	5	0	1	14	5	9	15
New Caledonia	6	2	2	2	12	10	2	8
Fiji	6	2	1	3	8	11	−3	7
Vanuatu	6	1	1	4	5	13	−8	4

Opponent
Result
Fifth round
(AFC)
Opponent
Result
Saudi Arabia (H)
0–0
1st leg

Saudi Arabia (A)
2–2
2nd leg

== Match details ==
=== First leg ===
10 October 2009
18:30 UTC+03:00

Bahrain	0–0	New Zealand
	Report

Bahrain National Stadium, Riffa
Attendance: 37,000
Referee: Viktor Kassai (Hungary)

Bahrain
New Zealand

GK	1	Sayed Mohammed Jaffer
RB	15	Abdullah Omar
CB	16	Sayed Mohamed Adnan
CB	17	Hussain Ali Baba
LB	14	Salman Isa	(substituted off) 79'
CM	5	Mohamed Hubail
CM	7	Sayed Mahmood Jalal
CM	10	Mohamed Salmeen (c)
AM	12	Faouzi Mubarak Aaish
CF	9	Husain Ali	(substituted off) 65'
CF	6	Jaycee John Okwunwanne	(substituted off) 86'
Substitutions:
GK	18	Abbas Ahmed Khamis
DF	2	Mohamed Husain
MF	3	Ahmed Hassan Taleb
MF	4	Abdulla Baba Fatadi
MF	13	Mahmood Abdulrahman	(substituted on) 79'
FW	8	A'ala Hubail	(substituted on) 86'
FW	11	Ismail Abdul-Latif	(substituted on) 65'
Manager:
(Czech Republic) Milan Máčala

GK	1	Mark Paston	(yellow card) 76'
RB	11	Leo Bertos
CB	6	Ryan Nelsen (c)	(yellow card) 90+1'
CB	4	Ben Sigmund
LB	3	Tony Lochhead
DM	5	Ivan Vicelich
DM	7	Simon Elliott
CM	8	Tim Brown		(substituted off) 68'
RF	14	Rory Fallon		(substituted off) 66'
CF	10	Chris Killen
LF	9	Shane Smeltz
Substitutions:
GK	18	James Bannatyne
DF	2	Aaron Scott
DF	15	Dave Mulligan
DF	16	Andrew Boyens
MF	12	Michael McGlinchey		(substituted on) 68'
MF	17	Andrew Barron
FW	13	Chris Wood		(substituted on) 66'
Manager:
(New Zealand) Ricki Herbert

Officials

- Assistant referees:
  - Gábor Erős (Hungary)
  - Tibor Vámos (Hungary)
- Fourth official: Tamás Bognár (Hungary)

Match rules

- 90 minutes
- 3 (of 7) substitutions permitted

=== Second leg ===
14 November 2009
20:00 UTC+13:00

New Zealand	1–0	Bahrain
Fallon 45'	Report

Westpac Stadium, Wellington
Attendance: 36,500
Referee: Jorge Larrionda (Uruguay)

New Zealand
Bahrain

GK	1	Mark Paston
RB	11	Leo Bertos
CB	6	Ryan Nelsen (c)
CB	4	Ben Sigmund
LB	12	Michael McGlinchey		(substituted off) 64'
DM	5	Ivan Vicelich
DM	3	Tony Lochhead	(yellow card) 3'
CM	8	Tim Brown		(substituted off) 90'
RF	14	Rory Fallon
CF	10	Chris Killen		(substituted off) 82'
LF	9	Shane Smeltz
Substitutions:
GK	18	James Bannatyne
DF	2	Aaron Scott
DF	15	Dave Mulligan
DF	16	Andrew Boyens		(substituted on) 90'
MF	7	Simon Elliott
MF	17	Andrew Barron		(substituted on) 64'
FW	13	Chris Wood		(substituted on) 82'
Manager:
(New Zealand) Ricki Herbert

GK	1	Sayed Mohammed Jaffer
RB	15	Abdullah Omar
CB	16	Sayed Mohamed Adnan
CB	17	Hussain Ali Baba
LB	14	Salman Isa
RM	5	Mohamed Hubail		(substituted off) 85'
CM	7	Sayed Mahmood Jalal		(substituted off) 79'
LM	10	Mohamed Salmeen (c)
AM	4	Abdulla Baba Fatadi
AM	12	Faouzi Mubarak Aaish	(yellow card) 27'	(substituted off) 73'
CF	6	Jaycee John Okwunwanne	(yellow card) 90+3'
Substitutions:
GK	18	Abbas Ahmed Khamis
DF	2	Mohamed Husain
MF	3	Ahmed Hassan Taleb		(substituted on) 85'
MF	13	Mahmood Abdulrahman		(substituted on) 79'
FW	8	A'ala Hubail
FW	9	Husain Ali
FW	11	Ismail Abdul-Latif		(substituted on) 73'
Manager:
(Czech Republic) Milan Máčala

Officials

- Assistant referees:
  - Pablo Fandiño (Uruguay)
  - Mauricio Espinosa (Uruguay)
- Fourth official: Roberto Silvera (Uruguay)

Match rules

- 90 minutes
- 30 minutes of extra-time if necessary
- Penalty shoot-out if scores still level
- 3 (of 7) substitutions permitted

== Aftermath ==
New Zealand qualified for the 2010 FIFA World Cup Finals in South Africa and were drawn into Group F with defending champions Italy, Slovakia and Paraguay. After drawing 1–1 with Slovakia in their opening match, New Zealand drew 1–1 with Italy, and in their final match, they also drew 0–0 with Paraguay; meaning they finished third in the group on three points. New Zealand's three draws meant that they were the only unbeaten team at the 2010 World Cup.

After the play-off, Bahrain qualified for the 2011 AFC Asian Cup in Qatar. They went on to finish third in Group C; losing 2–1 to South Korea in their opening match, then beating India 5–2, before being eliminated from the competition after a 1–0 defeat to Australia.
