= 2009 FIFA Confederations Cup squads =

The following is a list of squads for each nation who competed at the 2009 FIFA Confederations Cup in South Africa from 14 June to 28 June 2009, as a prelude to the 2010 FIFA World Cup. Each squad consisted of 23 players, three of which had to be goalkeepers. Replacement of injured players was permitted until 24 hours before the team's game. Players marked (c) were named as captain for their national team.

Caps, goals and ages as of 14 June 2009, before 2009 FIFA Confederations Cup.

== Group A ==
=== Iraq ===
Head coach: (Serbia) Bora Milutinović

No.	Pos.	Player	Date of birth (age)	Caps	Goals	Club
1	GK	Noor Sabri	18 June 1984 (aged 24)	63	0	(Iraq Football Association) Al-Talaba
2	DF	Mohammed Ali Karim	25 June 1986 (aged 22)	6	0	(United Arab Emirates Football Association) Al Jazira
3	DF	Bassim Abbas	1 July 1982 (aged 26)	60	2	(Iraq Football Association) Al-Talaba
4	MF	Fareed Majeed	10 April 1986 (aged 23)	5	0	(Iraq Football Association) Al-Talaba
5	MF	Nashat Akram	12 September 1984 (aged 24)	75	10	(Qatar Football Association) Al-Gharafa
6	MF	Salih Sadir	21 August 1981 (aged 27)	47	11	(Lebanese Football Association) Al-Ahed
7	FW	Emad Mohammed	24 July 1982 (aged 26)	76	23	(Football Federation Islamic Republic of Iran) Sepahan
8	FW	Luay Salah	7 February 1982 (aged 27)	17	3	(Iraq Football Association) Erbil
9	MF	Abdul-Wahab Abu Al-Hail	21 December 1975 (aged 33)	67	8	(Football Federation Islamic Republic of Iran) Sepahan
10	FW	Younis Mahmoud (c)	3 February 1983 (aged 26)	70	28	(Qatar Football Association) Al-Gharafa
11	MF	Hawar Mulla Mohammed	1 June 1981 (aged 28)	72	15	(Cyprus Football Association) Anorthosis Famagusta
12	GK	Mohammed Gassid	10 December 1986 (aged 22)	11	0	(Iraq Football Association) Al-Zawraa
13	MF	Karrar Jassim	11 June 1987 (aged 22)	22	1	(Qatar Football Association) Al-Wakrah
14	DF	Salam Shaker	31 July 1986 (aged 22)	11	0	(Qatar Football Association) Al-Khor
15	DF	Ali Rehema	8 August 1985 (aged 23)	45	1	(Qatar Football Association) Al-Wakrah
16	DF	Dara Mohammed	16 July 1987 (aged 21)	1	0	(Iraq Football Association) Sulaymaniya
17	FW	Alaa Abdul-Zahra	22 December 1987 (aged 21)	10	1	(Qatar Football Association) Al-Khor
18	MF	Mahdi Karim	10 December 1983 (aged 25)	64	10	(Qatar Football Association) Al-Khor
19	DF	Essam Yassin	11 March 1987 (aged 22)	1	0	(Iraq Football Association) Al-Amana
20	MF	Samer Saeed	1 July 1987 (aged 21)	7	0	(Libyan Football Federation) Al Ahli Tripoli
21	GK	Oday Taleb	1 July 1981 (aged 27)	5	0	(Iraq Football Association) Duhok
22	DF	Muayad Khalid	3 September 1987 (aged 21)	3	0	(Iraq Football Association) Al-Quwa Al-Jawiya
23	MF	Halgurd Mulla Mohammed	1 July 1988 (aged 20)	5	0	(Iraq Football Association) Sulaymaniya

=== New Zealand ===
Head coach: Ricki Herbert

No.	Pos.	Player	Date of birth (age)	Caps	Goals	Club
1	GK	Mark Paston	13 December 1976 (aged 32)	17	0	(New Zealand Football) Wellington Phoenix
2	DF	Aaron Scott	19 July 1986 (aged 22)	2	0	(New Zealand Football) Waitakere United
3	DF	Tony Lochhead	12 January 1982 (aged 27)	20	0	(New Zealand Football) Wellington Phoenix
4	MF	Duncan Oughton	14 June 1977 (aged 32)	24	2	(United States Soccer Federation) Columbus Crew
5	DF	Ben Sigmund	3 February 1981 (aged 28)	8	1	(New Zealand Football) Wellington Phoenix
6	DF	Ivan Vicelich	3 September 1976 (aged 32)	59	6	(New Zealand Football) Auckland City
7	MF	Simon Elliott	10 June 1974 (aged 35)	54	6	(United States Soccer Federation) San Jose Earthquakes
8	MF	Tim Brown (c)	6 March 1981 (aged 28)	17	0	(New Zealand Football) Wellington Phoenix
9	FW	Shane Smeltz	29 September 1981 (aged 27)	20	13	(Football Australia) Gold Coast United
10	FW	Chris Killen	8 October 1981 (aged 27)	24	10	(Scottish Football Association) Celtic
11	MF	Leo Bertos	20 December 1981 (aged 27)	24	0	(New Zealand Football) Wellington Phoenix
12	GK	Glen Moss	19 January 1983 (aged 26)	11	0	(Football Australia) Melbourne Victory
13	MF	Andrew Barron	24 December 1980 (aged 28)	8	1	(New Zealand Football) Team Wellington
14	MF	Jeremy Christie	22 May 1983 (aged 26)	17	1	(New Zealand Football) Wellington Phoenix
15	FW	Jeremy Brockie	7 October 1987 (aged 21)	13	0	(Football Australia) North Queensland Fury
16	MF	Chris James	4 July 1987 (aged 21)	10	0	(Football Association of Finland) Tampere United
17	DF	Dave Mulligan	24 March 1982 (aged 27)	21	3	(New Zealand Football) Wellington Phoenix
18	DF	Andrew Boyens	18 September 1983 (aged 25)	8	0	(United States Soccer Federation) New York Red Bulls
19	DF	Steven Old	17 February 1986 (aged 23)	17	1	(Scottish Football Association) Kilmarnock
20	FW	Chris Wood	7 December 1991 (aged 17)	2	0	(The Football Association) West Bromwich Albion
21	FW	Kris Bright	15 September 1986 (aged 22)	3	1	(Hellenic Football Federation) Panserraikos
22	FW	Jarrod Smith	20 June 1984 (aged 24)	12	0	(United States Soccer Federation) Seattle Sounders FC
23	GK	James Bannatyne	30 June 1975 (aged 33)	3	0	(New Zealand Football) Team Wellington

=== South Africa ===
Head coach: (Brazil) Joel Santana

No.	Pos.	Player	Date of birth (age)	Caps	Goals	Club
1	GK	Rowen Fernández	28 February 1978 (aged 31)	19	0	(German Football Association) Arminia Bielefeld
2	DF	Siboniso Gaxa	6 April 1984 (aged 25)	20	0	(South African Football Association) Mamelodi Sundowns
3	DF	Tsepo Masilela	5 May 1985 (aged 24)	18	0	(Israel Football Association) Maccabi Haifa
4	MF	Aaron Mokoena (c)	25 November 1980 (aged 28)	85	1	(The Football Association) Blackburn Rovers
5	DF	Benson Mhlongo	9 November 1980 (aged 28)	27	1	(South African Football Association) Orlando Pirates
6	MF	MacBeth Sibaya	25 November 1977 (aged 31)	48	0	(Russian Football Union) Rubin Kazan
7	MF	Lance Davids	11 April 1985 (aged 24)	16	0	(South African Football Association) Supersport United
8	DF	Siphiwe Tshabalala	25 September 1984 (aged 24)	28	3	(South African Football Association) Kaizer Chiefs
9	FW	Katlego Mphela	29 November 1984 (aged 24)	11	4	(South African Football Association) Mamelodi Sundowns
10	MF	Steven Pienaar	17 March 1982 (aged 27)	39	2	(The Football Association) Everton
11	FW	Elrio van Heerden	11 July 1983 (aged 25)	27	3	(Royal Belgian Football Association) Club Brugge
12	FW	Teko Modise	22 December 1982 (aged 26)	33	9	(South African Football Association) Orlando Pirates
13	MF	Kagisho Dikgacoi	24 November 1984 (aged 24)	19	2	(South African Football Association) Golden Arrows
14	DF	Matthew Booth	14 March 1977 (aged 32)	20	1	(South African Football Association) Mamelodi Sundowns
15	DF	Innocent Mdledle	12 November 1985 (aged 23)	5	0	(South African Football Association) Orlando Pirates
16	GK	Itumeleng Khune	20 June 1987 (aged 21)	14	0	(South African Football Association) Kaizer Chiefs
17	MF	Bernard Parker	16 March 1986 (aged 23)	13	5	(Football Association of Serbia) Red Star Belgrade
18	FW	Thembinkosi Fanteni	2 February 1984 (aged 25)	17	2	(Israel Football Association) Maccabi Haifa
19	MF	Bryce Moon	6 April 1986 (aged 23)	15	1	(Hellenic Football Federation) Panathinaikos
20	DF	Bongani Khumalo	6 January 1987 (aged 22)	5	0	(South African Football Association) Supersport United
21	FW	Katlego Mashego	18 May 1982 (aged 27)	9	1	(South African Football Association) Orlando Pirates
22	GK	Brian Baloyi	16 March 1974 (aged 35)	24	0	(South African Football Association) Mamelodi Sundowns
23	DF	Morgan Gould	23 March 1983 (aged 26)	2	0	(South African Football Association) Supersport United

=== Spain ===
Head coach: Vicente del Bosque

No.	Pos.	Player	Date of birth (age)	Caps	Goals	Club
1	GK	Iker Casillas (c)	20 May 1981 (aged 28)	92	0	(Royal Spanish Football Federation) Real Madrid
2	DF	Raúl Albiol	4 September 1985 (aged 23)	13	0	(Royal Spanish Football Federation) Valencia
3	DF	Gerard Piqué	2 February 1987 (aged 22)	3	1	(Royal Spanish Football Federation) Barcelona
4	DF	Carlos Marchena	31 July 1979 (aged 29)	51	2	(Royal Spanish Football Federation) Valencia
5	DF	Carles Puyol	13 April 1978 (aged 31)	73	2	(Royal Spanish Football Federation) Barcelona
6	MF	Pablo Hernández	11 April 1985 (aged 24)	0	0	(Royal Spanish Football Federation) Valencia
7	FW	David Villa	3 December 1981 (aged 27)	44	28	(Royal Spanish Football Federation) Valencia
8	MF	Xavi	25 January 1980 (aged 29)	72	8	(Royal Spanish Football Federation) Barcelona
9	FW	Fernando Torres	20 March 1984 (aged 25)	62	19	(The Football Association) Liverpool
10	MF	Cesc Fàbregas	4 May 1987 (aged 22)	38	1	(The Football Association) Arsenal
11	DF	Joan Capdevila	3 February 1978 (aged 31)	33	4	(Royal Spanish Football Federation) Villarreal
12	MF	Sergio Busquets	16 July 1988 (aged 20)	2	0	(Royal Spanish Football Federation) Barcelona
13	GK	Diego López	3 November 1981 (aged 27)	0	0	(Royal Spanish Football Federation) Villarreal
14	MF	Xabi Alonso	25 November 1981 (aged 27)	57	4	(The Football Association) Liverpool
15	DF	Sergio Ramos	30 March 1986 (aged 23)	49	4	(Royal Spanish Football Federation) Real Madrid
16	FW	Fernando Llorente	26 February 1985 (aged 24)	3	1	(Royal Spanish Football Federation) Athletic Bilbao
17	FW	Dani Güiza	17 August 1980 (aged 28)	15	3	(Turkish Football Federation) Fenerbahçe
18	MF	Albert Riera	15 April 1982 (aged 27)	9	3	(The Football Association) Liverpool
19	DF	Álvaro Arbeloa	17 January 1983 (aged 26)	6	0	(The Football Association) Liverpool
20	MF	Santi Cazorla	13 December 1984 (aged 24)	16	1	(Royal Spanish Football Federation) Villarreal
21	MF	David Silva	8 January 1986 (aged 23)	23	3	(Royal Spanish Football Federation) Valencia
22	MF	Juan Mata	28 April 1988 (aged 21)	1	0	(Royal Spanish Football Federation) Valencia
23	GK	Pepe Reina	31 August 1982 (aged 26)	14	0	(The Football Association) Liverpool

== Group B ==
=== Brazil ===
Head coach: Dunga

No.	Pos.	Player	Date of birth (age)	Caps	Goals	Club
1	GK	Júlio César	3 September 1979 (aged 29)	34	0	(Italian Football Federation) Inter Milan
2	DF	Maicon	26 July 1981 (aged 27)	44	4	(Italian Football Federation) Inter Milan
3	DF	Lúcio (c)	8 May 1978 (aged 31)	79	3	(German Football Association) Bayern Munich
4	DF	Juan	1 February 1979 (aged 30)	70	5	(Italian Football Federation) Roma
5	MF	Felipe Melo	26 June 1983 (aged 25)	5	1	(Italian Football Federation) Fiorentina
6	DF	Kléber	1 April 1980 (aged 29)	18	1	(Brazilian Football Confederation) Internacional
7	MF	Elano	14 June 1981 (aged 28)	32	6	(The Football Association) Manchester City
8	MF	Gilberto Silva	7 October 1976 (aged 32)	74	3	(Hellenic Football Federation) Panathinaikos
9	FW	Luís Fabiano	8 November 1980 (aged 28)	26	17	(Royal Spanish Football Federation) Sevilla
10	MF	Kaká	22 April 1982 (aged 27)	65	24	(Italian Football Federation) Milan
11	FW	Robinho	25 January 1984 (aged 25)	65	18	(The Football Association) Manchester City
12	GK	Victor	21 January 1983 (aged 26)	0	0	(Brazilian Football Confederation) Grêmio
13	DF	Dani Alves	6 May 1983 (aged 26)	23	2	(Royal Spanish Football Federation) Barcelona
14	DF	Luisão	13 February 1981 (aged 28)	30	2	(Portuguese Football Federation) Benfica
15	DF	Miranda	7 September 1984 (aged 24)	1	0	(Brazilian Football Confederation) São Paulo
16	DF	André Santos	8 March 1983 (aged 26)	0	0	(Brazilian Football Confederation) Corinthians
17	MF	Josué	19 July 1979 (aged 29)	24	1	(German Football Association) VfL Wolfsburg
18	MF	Ramires	24 March 1987 (aged 22)	2	0	(Brazilian Football Confederation) Cruzeiro
19	MF	Júlio Baptista	1 October 1981 (aged 27)	40	4	(Italian Football Federation) Roma
20	MF	Kléberson	19 June 1979 (aged 29)	28	2	(Brazilian Football Confederation) Flamengo
21	FW	Alexandre Pato	2 September 1989 (aged 19)	7	1	(Italian Football Federation) Milan
22	FW	Nilmar	14 July 1984 (aged 24)	7	2	(Brazilian Football Confederation) Internacional
23	GK	Heurelho Gomes	15 February 1981 (aged 28)	9	0	(The Football Association) Tottenham Hotspur

=== Egypt ===
Head coach: Hassan Shehata

No.	Pos.	Player	Date of birth (age)	Caps	Goals	Club
1	GK	Essam El-Hadary	15 January 1973 (aged 36)	88	0	(Swiss Football Association) Sion
2	DF	Mahmoud Fathalla	13 February 1982 (aged 27)	20	0	(Egyptian Football Association) Zamalek
3	MF	Ahmed Elmohamady	9 September 1987 (aged 21)	23	0	(Egyptian Football Association) ENPPI
4	DF	Ahmed Said	13 March 1984 (aged 25)	2	0	(Egyptian Football Association) Haras El Hodood
5	DF	Ahmed Khairy	1 October 1987 (aged 21)	1	0	(Egyptian Football Association) Ismaily
6	DF	Hany Said	22 April 1980 (aged 29)	59	0	(Egyptian Football Association) Zamalek
7	DF	Ahmed Fathy	10 November 1984 (aged 24)	53	2	(Egyptian Football Association) Al Ahly
8	MF	Hosny Abd Rabo	1 November 1984 (aged 24)	56	8	(United Arab Emirates Football Association) Al-Ahli Dubai
9	FW	Mohamed Zidan	11 December 1981 (aged 27)	21	4	(German Football Association) Borussia Dortmund
10	MF	Ahmed Eid Abdel Malek	15 May 1980 (aged 29)	21	4	(Egyptian Football Association) Haras El Hodood
11	MF	Mohamed Shawky	5 October 1981 (aged 27)	56	4	(The Football Association) Middlesbrough
12	MF	Homos	1 January 1979 (aged 30)	15	0	(Egyptian Football Association) Ismaily
13	MF	Abdelaziz Tawfik	24 May 1986 (aged 23)	2	0	(Egyptian Football Association) ENPPI
14	DF	Sayed Moawad	25 May 1979 (aged 30)	35	2	(Egyptian Football Association) Al Ahly
15	MF	Ahmed Samir Farag	20 May 1986 (aged 23)	6	0	(Egyptian Football Association) Ismaily
16	GK	Abdel-Wahed El-Sayed	3 June 1977 (aged 32)	26	0	(Egyptian Football Association) Zamalek
17	MF	Ahmed Hassan (c)	2 May 1975 (aged 34)	153	26	(Egyptian Football Association) Al Ahly
18	FW	Ahmed Abdel-Ghani	1 December 1981 (aged 27)	4	1	(Egyptian Football Association) Haras El Hodood
19	FW	Mohamed Mohsen Abo Gresha	4 August 1981 (aged 27)	6	0	(Egyptian Football Association) Ismaily
20	DF	Wael Gomaa	3 August 1975 (aged 33)	74	0	(Egyptian Football Association) Al Ahly
21	FW	Ahmed Raouf	15 September 1982 (aged 26)	3	0	(Egyptian Football Association) ENPPI
22	MF	Mohamed Aboutrika	7 November 1978 (aged 30)	56	20	(Egyptian Football Association) Al Ahly
23	GK	Mohamed Sobhy	30 August 1981 (aged 27)	0	0	(Egyptian Football Association) Ismaily

=== Italy ===
Head coach: Marcello Lippi

No.	Pos.	Player	Date of birth (age)	Caps	Goals	Club
1	GK	Gianluigi Buffon	28 January 1978 (aged 31)	92	0	(Italian Football Federation) Juventus
2	DF	Davide Santon	2 January 1991 (aged 18)	2	0	(Italian Football Federation) Inter Milan
3	MF	Fabio Grosso	28 November 1977 (aged 31)	42	3	(French Football Federation) Lyon
4	DF	Giorgio Chiellini	14 August 1984 (aged 24)	18	1	(Italian Football Federation) Juventus
5	DF	Fabio Cannavaro (c)	13 September 1973 (aged 35)	124	2	(Royal Spanish Football Federation) Real Madrid
6	DF	Nicola Legrottaglie	20 October 1976 (aged 32)	13	1	(Italian Football Federation) Juventus
7	MF	Simone Pepe	30 August 1983 (aged 25)	7	0	(Italian Football Federation) Udinese
8	MF	Gennaro Gattuso	9 January 1978 (aged 31)	67	1	(Italian Football Federation) Milan
9	FW	Luca Toni	26 May 1977 (aged 32)	44	16	(German Football Association) Bayern Munich
10	MF	Daniele De Rossi	24 July 1983 (aged 25)	45	7	(Italian Football Federation) Roma
11	FW	Alberto Gilardino	5 July 1982 (aged 26)	32	12	(Italian Football Federation) Fiorentina
12	GK	Morgan De Sanctis	26 March 1977 (aged 32)	3	0	(Turkish Football Federation) Galatasaray
13	DF	Alessandro Gamberini	27 August 1981 (aged 27)	6	0	(Italian Football Federation) Fiorentina
14	GK	Marco Amelia	2 April 1982 (aged 27)	9	0	(Italian Football Federation) Palermo
15	FW	Vincenzo Iaquinta	21 November 1979 (aged 29)	28	4	(Italian Football Federation) Juventus
16	MF	Mauro Camoranesi	4 October 1976 (aged 32)	44	4	(Italian Football Federation) Juventus
17	FW	Giuseppe Rossi	1 February 1987 (aged 22)	5	1	(Royal Spanish Football Federation) Villarreal
18	MF	Angelo Palombo	25 September 1981 (aged 27)	10	0	(Italian Football Federation) Sampdoria
19	DF	Gianluca Zambrotta	19 February 1977 (aged 32)	84	2	(Italian Football Federation) Milan
20	MF	Riccardo Montolivo	18 January 1985 (aged 24)	6	0	(Italian Football Federation) Fiorentina
21	MF	Andrea Pirlo	19 May 1979 (aged 30)	56	8	(Italian Football Federation) Milan
22	DF	Andrea Dossena	11 September 1981 (aged 27)	9	0	(The Football Association) Liverpool
23	FW	Fabio Quagliarella	31 January 1983 (aged 26)	13	3	(Italian Football Federation) Udinese

=== United States ===
Head coach: Bob Bradley

No.	Pos.	Player	Date of birth (age)	Caps	Goals	Club
1	GK	Tim Howard	6 March 1979 (aged 30)	39	0	(The Football Association) Everton
2	DF	Jonathan Bornstein	7 November 1984 (aged 24)	15	1	(United States Soccer Federation) Chivas USA
3	DF	Carlos Bocanegra (c)	25 May 1979 (aged 30)	67	11	(French Football Federation) Rennes
4	FW	Conor Casey	25 July 1981 (aged 27)	10	0	(United States Soccer Federation) Colorado Rapids
5	DF	Oguchi Onyewu	13 May 1982 (aged 27)	42	5	(Royal Belgian Football Association) Standard Liège
6	DF	Heath Pearce	13 August 1984 (aged 24)	23	0	(German Football Association) Hansa Rostock
7	MF	DaMarcus Beasley	24 May 1982 (aged 27)	87	17	(Scottish Football Association) Rangers
8	FW	Clint Dempsey	9 March 1983 (aged 26)	51	13	(The Football Association) Fulham
9	FW	Charlie Davies	23 June 1986 (aged 22)	6	1	(Swedish Football Association) Hammarby
10	MF	Landon Donovan	4 March 1982 (aged 27)	110	39	(United States Soccer Federation) LA Galaxy
11	DF	Marvell Wynne	8 May 1986 (aged 23)	3	0	(Canadian Soccer Association) Toronto FC
12	MF	Michael Bradley	31 July 1987 (aged 21)	29	5	(German Football Association) Borussia Mönchengladbach
13	MF	Ricardo Clark	10 February 1983 (aged 26)	19	1	(United States Soccer Federation) Houston Dynamo
14	DF	Danny Califf	17 March 1980 (aged 29)	23	1	(Danish Football Association) Midtjylland
15	DF	Jay DeMerit	4 December 1979 (aged 29)	10	0	(The Football Association) Watford
16	MF	Sacha Kljestan	9 September 1985 (aged 23)	17	3	(United States Soccer Federation) Chivas USA
17	FW	Jozy Altidore	6 November 1989 (aged 19)	11	6	(Royal Spanish Football Federation) Xerez
18	GK	Brad Guzan	9 September 1984 (aged 24)	12	0	(The Football Association) Aston Villa
19	FW	Freddy Adu	2 June 1989 (aged 20)	13	1	(French Football Federation) Monaco
20	MF	José Francisco Torres	29 October 1987 (aged 21)	5	0	(Mexican Football Federation) Pachuca
21	DF	Jonathan Spector	1 March 1986 (aged 23)	13	0	(The Football Association) West Ham United
22	MF	Benny Feilhaber	19 January 1985 (aged 24)	17	2	(Danish Football Association) AGF
23	GK	Luis Robles	11 May 1984 (aged 25)	0	0	(German Football Association) 1. FC Kaiserslautern

== Player statistics ==
Player representation by club

Players	Clubs
7	(New Zealand) Wellington Phoenix
6	(England) Liverpool, (Spain) Valencia
5	(Egypt) Al Ahly, (Egypt) Ismaily, (Italy) Juventus, (Italy) Milan, (Spain) Barcelona, (Spain) Villarreal
4	(Italy) Fiorentina, (South Africa) Mamelodi Sundowns, (South Africa) Orlando Pirates

Player representation by club nationality

Players	Nations
24	Italy
21	Spain
19	Egypt
18	England
14	South Africa
10	United States

* Nations in italics are not represented by their national teams in the tournament.
