= 2024 OFC Futsal Men's Champions League =

Tournament details
- Host country: New Caledonia
- Dates: 23–28 April
- Teams: 5 (from 5 associations)

Final positions
- Champions: (New Caledonia) AS PTT (1st title)
- Runners-up: (Solomon Islands) Mataks FC

Tournament statistics
- Matches played: 12
- Goals scored: 72 (6 per match)
- Attendance: 5,650 (471 per match)
- Top scorer(s): Robert Freddy Forrest; James Namuli; Christ Pei (6 goals each)
- Best player: Christ Pei
- Best goalkeeper: Matthieu Wassin
- Fair play award: AS PTT

The 2024 OFC Futsal Men's Champions League was the second edition of the OFC Futsal Champions League, and was held from 23 to 28 April 2024.

== Teams ==
Team	Appearance	Previous best performance
(New Caledonia) AS PTT (hosts)	2nd	Runners-up (2019)
(Solomon Islands) Mataks FC	1st	Debut
(Fiji) Suva Futsal Club	2nd	5th place (2019)
(Vanuatu) UNV FC	1st	Debut
(Tonga) Veitongo FC	1st	Debut

== Group stage ==
The draw for the group stage was held on 6 March 2024.

Pos	Team	Pld	W	D	L	GF	GA	GD	Pts	Qualification	PTT	MAT	UNV	SUV	VEI
1	(New Caledonia) AS PTT (H)	4	3	1	0	24	7	+17	10	Advanced to Final	—				
2	(Solomon Islands) Mataks FC	4	3	1	0	12	5	+7	10	Advanced to Final		—			
3	(Vanuatu) UNV FC	4	2	0	2	11	13	−2	6	Advanced to Third place match			—		
4	(Fiji) Suva Futsal Club	4	1	0	3	12	13	−1	3	Advanced to Third place match				—	
5	(Tonga) Veitongo FC	4	0	0	4	4	25	−21	0						—

Source: OFC
(H) Hosts
23 April 2024
17:00

Mataks FC (Solomon Islands)	3–2	(Vanuatu) UNV FC
Mana 3'; Afi 23', 33' (pen.)	Report	Wilkins 9'; Berukilukilu 20'

L'Arene du Sud, Païta, New Caledonia
Attendance: 300
Referee: Antony Riley (New Zealand)
23 April 2024
20:00

Veitongo FC (Tonga)	2–11	(New Caledonia) AS PTT
Kefu 21'; Polovili 26'	Report	Hmaen 1'; Pei 2', 30'; Upa 5'; Forrest 14'; Wassin 20'; Wainebengo 23', 26'; Namuli 29'; Pimbe 30'; Schwartz 35'

L'Arene du Sud, Païta, New Caledonia
Attendance: 400
Referee: Andres Daniel Pena Garcia (Argentina)

24 April 2024
17:00

Veitongo FC (Tonga)	0–7	(Fiji) Suva Futsal Club
	Report	Chand 2', 2', 3'; R. Singh 3'; D. Singh 6'; Baravilala 16'; Lutu 18' (o.g.)

L'Arene du Sud, Païta, New Caledonia
Attendance: 150
Referee: Arnaud Llambrich (New Caledonia)
24 April 2024
20:00

AS PTT (New Caledonia)	7–2	(Vanuatu) UNV FC
Wainebengo 3'; Forrest 23', 36', 38'; Namuli 24', 33'; Hmaen 29'	Report	Bahormal 15'; Timatua 21'

L'Arene du Sud, Païta, New Caledonia
Attendance: 400
Referee: Philip Mana (Solomon Islands)

25 April 2024
17:00

UNV FC (Vanuatu)	3–2	(Fiji) Suva Futsal Club
	Report

L'Arene du Sud, Païta, New Caledonia
25 April 2024
20:00

AS PTT (New Caledonia)	1–1	(Solomon Islands) Mataks FC
	Report

L'Arene du Sud, Païta, New Caledonia

26 April 2024
17:00

Suva Futsal Club (Fiji)	1–5	(Solomon Islands) Mataks FC
	Report

L'Arene du Sud, Païta, New Caledonia
26 April 2024
20:00

UNV FC (Vanuatu)	4–1	(Tonga) Veitongo FC
	Report

L'Arene du Sud, Païta, New Caledonia

27 April 2024
17:00

Mataks FC (Solomon Islands)	3–1	(Tonga) Veitongo FC
	Report

L'Arene du Sud, Païta, New Caledonia
Attendance: 150
Referee: Charlemagne Waheo (New Caledonia)
27 April 2024
20:00

Suva Futsal Club (Fiji)	2–5	(New Caledonia) AS PTT
	Report

L'Arene du Sud, Païta, New Caledonia
Attendance: 450
Referee: Benjamin Norman (New Zealand)

== Third place match ==
28 April 2024
15:00

UNV FC (Vanuatu)	2–0	(Fiji) Suva Futsal Club
Bahormal 37'; Berukilukilu 39' (pen.)	Report

L'Arene du Sud, Païta, New Caledonia
Attendance: 250
Referee: Andres Daniel Pena Garcia (Argentina)

== Final ==
28 April 2024
18:00

AS PTT (New Caledonia)	4–3	(Solomon Islands) Mataks FC
Upa 3', 36'; Hmaen 23'; Pei 35'	Report	Mana 14'; Misitana 25'; Afi 39'

L'Arene du Sud, Païta, New Caledonia
Attendance: 2,000
Referee: Antony Riley (New Zealand)

== Awards ==
Award	Player	Team
Golden Ball	(New Caledonia) Christ Pei	(New Caledonia) AS PTT
Golden Boot	(New Caledonia) Robert Freddy Forrest (New Caledonia) James Namuli (New Caledonia) Christ Pei	(New Caledonia) AS PTT (New Caledonia) AS PTT (New Caledonia) AS PTT
Golden Glove	(New Caledonia) Matthieu Wassin	(New Caledonia) AS PTT
Fair Play Award	–	(New Caledonia) AS PTT
Atta Elayyan Award	(New Caledonia) Jymaël Upa	(New Caledonia) AS PTT

== Broadcasting ==
All matches were broadcast live on FIFA+.
