= 2024 OFC Futsal Women's Nations Cup =

Tournament details
- Host country: Solomon Islands
- City: Honiara
- Dates: 17–25 August 2024
- Teams: 5 (from 1 confederation)
- Venue: 1 (in 1 host city)

Final positions
- Champions: New Zealand (1st title)
- Runners-up: Fiji
- Third place: Tahiti
- Fourth place: Solomon Islands

Tournament statistics
- Matches played: 12
- Goals scored: 74 (6.17 per match)
- Attendance: 6,150 (513 per match)
- Top scorer(s): (Fiji) Koleta Likuculacula (7 goals)
- Best player: (New Zealand) Hannah Kraakman
- Best goalkeeper: (New Zealand) Danielle Bradley
- Fair play award: Solomon Islands

The 2024 OFC Futsal Women's Nations Cup was the inaugural edition of the OFC Futsal Women's Nations Cup, the premier competition for women's futsal in the region. It was held from 17 August to 25 August 2024.

The champions of the tournament, New Zealand qualified as the OFC representative at the 2025 FIFA Futsal Women's World Cup in Philippines.

== Teams ==
- Fiji
- New Zealand
- Solomon Islands (hosts)
- Tahiti
- Tonga

== Group stage ==
The draw for the group stage was held on 11 June 2024.

Pos	Team	Pld	W	D	L	GF	GA	GD	Pts	Qualification
1	New Zealand	4	4	0	0	29	2	+27	12	Final
2	Fiji	4	3	0	1	13	12	+1	9	Final
3	Tahiti	4	2	0	2	12	9	+3	6	Third place match
4	Solomon Islands (H)	4	1	0	3	5	15	−10	3	Third place match
5	Tonga	4	0	0	4	0	21	−21	0	

Source: OFC
(H) Hosts
17 August 2024
15:00

New Zealand	10–0	Tonga
Leong 01:56, 07:55; Kraakman 03:26; Evans 10:03; Cooper 13:04; Bloomfield 31:33; Anthony 34:21; Bremner 37:20; Catherwood 39:36; Boobyer 39:47	Report

Friendship Hall, Honiara
Attendance: 500
Referee: Arnaud Llambrich (New Caledonia)
17 August 2024
17:00

Tahiti	1–2	Fiji
Rameha 15:44	Report	Likuculacula 17:04, 36:33

Friendship Hall, Honiara
Attendance: 550
Referee: Benjamin Norman (New Zealand)

18 August 2024
15:00

Fiji	4–0	Tonga
Diyalowai 00:10, 21:00; Likuculacula 25:06; Tuberi 30:35	Report

Friendship Hall, Honiara
Attendance: 450
Referee: Philip Mana (Solomon Islands)
18 August 2024
17:00

Tahiti	5–1	Solomon Islands
Hauata 02:46; Rameha 07:23; Tissot 17:00; Deane 32:40; Mai 34:40	Report	Pegi 10:27

Friendship Hall, Honiara
Attendance: 900
Referee: Malkom Mayoho (Vanuatu)

20 August 2024
15:00

Fiji	1–9	New Zealand
Likuculacula 26:21	Report	Catherwood 02:42, 19:20; Veronika 05:43 (o.g.); Manak 13:54, 30:48; Cooper 17:14; Leong 29:41; Bloomfield 36:20; Kraakman 39:19

Friendship Hall, Honiara
Attendance: 300
Referee: Arnaud Llambrich (New Caledonia)
20 August 2024
17:00

Tonga	0–2	Solomon Islands
	Report	Pegi 26:52, 27:09

Friendship Hall, Honiara
Attendance: 400
Referee: Reem Al-Bishi (Saudi Arabia)

22 August 2024
15:00

Tonga	0–5	Tahiti
	Report	Hioe 01:32 (pen.), 24:36, 39:40; Taumaa 16:37; Fournier 39:05

Friendship Hall, Honiara
Attendance: 150
Referee: Benjamin Norman (New Zealand)
22 August 2024
17:00

Solomon Islands	0–4	New Zealand
	Report	Kraakman 01:20; Bremner 14:06; Boobyer 22:01, 29:35

Friendship Hall, Honiara
Attendance: 350
Referee: Arnaud Llambrich (New Caledonia)

23 August 2024
15:00

New Zealand	6–1	Tahiti
Kraakman 01:41; Manak 17:38; Catherwood 20:09, 28:24, 36:21; Evans 31:44	Report	Hioe 37:56

Friendship Hall, Honiara
Attendance: 250
Referee: Philip Mana (Solomon Islands)
23 August 2024
17:00

Solomon Islands	2–6	Fiji
Nasau 06:26 (o.g.); Tuberi 21:49 (o.g.)	Report	Likuculacula 02:26, 05:19; Kuladina 13:37; Diyalowai 16:48; Nasau 20:07; Hussein 36:15

Friendship Hall, Honiara
Attendance: 400
Referee: Benjamin Norman (New Zealand)

== Third place match ==
25 August 2024
15:00

Tahiti	4–3	Solomon Islands
Manutahi 17:06; Hauata 18:56, 37:22; Ueva 35:13	Report	Pegi 21:36, 38:06; Arukau 36:50

Friendship Hall, Honiara
Attendance: 900
Referee: Benjamin Norman (New Zealand)

== Final ==
Winners will qualify for the 2025 FIFA Futsal Women's World Cup.

25 August 2024
17:00

New Zealand	7–1	Fiji
Kraakman 1:44, 33:20; Boobyer 9:47; Leong 27:04; Bremner 28:51; Manak 35:56; Diyalowai 37:58 (o.g.)	Report	Likuculacula 18:53

Friendship Hall, Honiara
Attendance: 1,000
Referee: Philip Mana (Solomon Islands)

== Qualified teams for the 2025 FIFA Futsal Women's World Cup ==
The following team from OFC qualified for the 2025 FIFA Futsal Women's World Cup.

Team	Qualified on
New Zealand	25 August 2024

== Goalscorers ==
There were 74 goals scored in 12 matches, for an average of 6.17 goals per match.

7 goals

- (Fiji) Koleta Likuculacula

6 goals

- (New Zealand) Jemma Catherwood
- (New Zealand) Hannah Kraakman

5 goals

- (Solomon Islands) Ileen Pegi

4 goals

- (New Zealand) Libby Boobyer
- (New Zealand) Tessa Leong
- (New Zealand) Dayna Manak
- (French Polynesia) Ninauea Hioe

3 goals

- (Fiji) Sofi Diyalowai
- (New Zealand) Jordana Bremner
- (French Polynesia) Lokelani Hauata

2 goals

- (New Zealand) Alosi Bloomfield
- (New Zealand) Maxine Cooper
- (New Zealand) Jamie Evans
- (French Polynesia) Marina Rameha

1 goal

- (Fiji) Aliza Hussein
- (Fiji) Cema Nasau
- (Fiji) Unaisi Tuberi
- (Fiji) Sisilia Tuvou Kuladina
- (New Zealand) Shivy Anthony
- (Solomon Islands) Madeline Arukau
- (French Polynesia) Vateanui Deane
- (French Polynesia) Gwendoline Fournier
- (French Polynesia) Kohai Mai
- (French Polynesia) Hereiti Manutahi
- (French Polynesia) Hanihei Taumaa
- (French Polynesia) Aurelya Tissot
- (French Polynesia) Raimateata Ueva

1 own goal

- (Fiji) Sofi Diyalowai (against New Zealand)
- (Fiji) Cema Nasau (against Solomon Islands)
- (Fiji) Unaisi Tuberi (against Solomon Islands)
- (Fiji) Maria Veronika (against New Zealand)
