= 2025 OFC Futsal Men's Champions League =

Tournament details
- Host country: Fiji
- Dates: 16–23 November
- Teams: 6 (from 6 associations)

Final positions
- Champions: (Solomon Islands) Mataks FC (1st title)
- Runners-up: (New Zealand) Waikato Rapids
- Third place: (New Caledonia) AS PTT
- Fourth place: (Vanuatu) Southern Legions FC

Tournament statistics
- Matches played: 18
- Goals scored: 148 (8.22 per match)
- Attendance: 1,623 (90 per match)
- Top scorer(s): (Solomon Islands) Elis Mana (Mataks FC) (9 goals)
- Best player(s): (Solomon Islands) Owen Bunabo (Mataks FC)
- Best goalkeeper: (New Zealand) Corbin Fell (Waikato Rapids)
- Fair play award: (New Caledonia) AS PTT

The 2025 OFC Futsal Men's Champions League is the third edition of the OFC Futsal Champions League, and it is held from 16 to 23 November 2025.

AS PTT were the defending champions, but were eliminated after finishing in the 3rd place on the group stage. Mataks FC later won their first title after defeating Waikato Rapids in the final on 7–8 penalties after 4–4 draw.

== Teams ==
| Team | Appearance | Previous best performance |
|---|---|---|
| (New Caledonia) AS PTT (title-holders) | 3rd | Champions (2024) |
| (Solomon Islands) Mataks FC | 2nd | Runners-up (2024) |
| (Fiji) Suva Futsal Club (hosts) | 3rd | 4th place (2024) |
| (Vanuatu) Southern Legions FC | 1st | Debut |
| (Papua New Guinea) Gulf Komara Futsal Club | 1st | Debut |
| (New Zealand) Waikato Rapids | 1st | Debut |

== Group stage ==
The draw for the group stage was held on 16 November 2025.

All times are local, FJT (UTC+12)

| Pos | Team | Pld | W | D | L | GF | GA | GD | Pts | Qualification | WKT | MAT | PTT | LGN | SUV | GKO |
|---|---|---|---|---|---|---|---|---|---|---|---|---|---|---|---|---|
| 1 | (New Zealand) Waikato Rapids | 5 | 5 | 0 | 0 | 29 | 8 | +21 | 15 | Advance to Final | — | | | | | |
| 2 | (Solomon Islands) Mataks FC | 5 | 3 | 0 | 2 | 27 | 22 | +5 | 9 | Advance to Final | | — | | | | |
| 3 | (New Caledonia) AS PTT | 5 | 2 | 2 | 1 | 18 | 9 | +9 | 8 | Advance to Third place play-off | | | — | | | |
| 4 | (Vanuatu) Southern Legions FC | 5 | 2 | 1 | 2 | 26 | 21 | +5 | 7 | Advance to Third place play-off | | | | — | | |
| 5 | (Fiji) Suva Futsal Club (H) | 5 | 1 | 1 | 3 | 13 | 18 | −5 | 4 | Advance to Fifth place play-off | | | | | — | |
| 6 | (Papua New Guinea) Gulf Komara Futsal Club | 5 | 0 | 0 | 5 | 11 | 46 | −35 | 0 | Advance to Fifth place play-off | | | | | | — |

Source: OFC
(H) Hosts
16 November 2025
13:00

| Waikato Rapids (New Zealand) | 8–1 | (Papua New Guinea) Gulf Komara Futsal Club |
|---|---|---|
| Ericksen 0', 31'; Innes 11'; Frida 33' (o.g.); Wink 34'; Dixon 36'; Howard 37'; Vhavha 38' | Report | Dobbin 28' |

Vodafone Arena, Suva, Fiji
Attendance: 50
Referee: Rex Kamusu (Solomon Islands)
16 November 2025
16:00

| AS PTT (New Caledonia) | 6–1 | (Solomon Islands) Mataks FC |
|---|---|---|
| Hmaen 7'; Pei 15', 31', 36' (pen.); Hary 27'; Qenegeie 36' | Report | Mana 5' |

Vodafone Arena, Suva, Fiji
Attendance: 195
Referee: Chris Sinclair (New Zealand)
16 November 2025
19:00

| Suva Futsal Club (Fiji) | 4–5 | (Vanuatu) Southern Legions FC |
|---|---|---|
| Rajneel 6'; Baravilala 28'; Krisneel 28'; Naidu 39' | Report | Bule 5'; Stevens 16'; Lehl 23'; Merrill 24' (o.g.); Nimbwen 30' |

Vodafone Arena, Suva, Fiji
Attendance: 272
Referee: Tita Rosia (Indonesia)

17 November 2025
13:00

| Southern Legions FC (Vanuatu) | 2–2 | (New Caledonia) AS PTT |
|---|---|---|
| Joseph 16'; Lehl 34' | Report | Robert 30'; Pei 32' |

Vodafone Arena, Suva, Fiji
Attendance: 50
Referee: Philip Mana (Solomon Islands)
17 November 2025
16:00

| Mataks FC (Solomon Islands) | 1–5 | (New Zealand) Waikato Rapids |
|---|---|---|
| Bunabo 24' | Report | Bordin 15'; Wink 19'; Howard 22'; Innes 31'; Sharplin 31' |

Vodafone Arena, Suva, Fiji
Attendance: 80
Referee: Fitra Fauzi Rahmat (Indonesia)
17 November 2025
19:00

| Gulf Komara Futsal Club (Papua New Guinea) | 2–5 | (Fiji) Suva Futsal Club |
|---|---|---|
| Vela 18', 19' | Report | Chand 3', 37'; Rajneel 3', 22'; Merrill 13' |

Vodafone Arena, Suva, Fiji
Attendance: 80
Referee: Benjamin Norman (New Zealand)

18 November 2025
13:00

| Southern Legions FC (Vanuatu) | 1–5 | (New Zealand) Waikato Rapids |
|---|---|---|
| Lehl 12' | Report | Innes 10', 13'; Sharplin 14'; Bordin 20'; Carter 22' |

Vodafone Arena, Suva, Fiji
Attendance: 80
Referee: Wahyu Wickasono (Indonesia)
18 November 2025
16:00

| Mataks FC (Solomon Islands) | 12–5 | (Papua New Guinea) Gulf Komara Futsal Club |
|---|---|---|
| Mana 0', 19', 32', 33'; Kasute'e 5'; Do'oro 10', 35'; Kindle 12', 22'; Bunabo 13', 36' | Report | Aisa 8', 33'; Eric 19'; Frida 32'; Regy 39' |

Vodafone Arena, Suva, Fiji
Attendance: 55
Referee: Dion Bradley (Australia)
18 November 2025
19:00

| AS PTT (New Caledonia) | 0–0 | (Fiji) Suva Futsal Club |
|---|---|---|
| | Report |

Vodafone Arena, Suva, Fiji
Attendance: 112
Referee: Benjamin Norman (New Zealand)

20 November 2025
13:00

| Waikato Rapids (New Zealand) | 5–2 | (New Caledonia) AS PTT |
|---|---|---|
| Bordin 0'; Ericksen 7'; Innes 23'; Sharplin 7', 28' | Report | Jymaël 19'; Pei 31' |

Vodafone Arena, Suva, Fiji
Attendance: 50
Referee: Wahyu Wickasono (Indonesia)
20 November 2025
16:00

| Gulf Komara Futsal Club (Papua New Guinea) | 2–13 | (Vanuatu) Southern Legions FC |
|---|---|---|
| Frida 22'; Regy 23' | Report | Lehl 10', 19'; Karlip 15', 26', 34'; Timatua 15', 35', 35'; Ashly 16', 17'; Jayson 20', 34'; Sovuai 32' |

Vodafone Arena, Suva, Fiji
Attendance: 50
Referee: Rex Kamusu (Solomon Islands)
20 November 2025
19:00

| Suva Futsal Club (Fiji) | 1–5 | (Solomon Islands) Mataks FC |
|---|---|---|
| Merrill 10' | Report | Bunabo 8'; Mana 13', 17'; Do'oro 21'; Mana 26' |

Vodafone Arena, Suva, Fiji
Referee: Chris Sinclair (New Zealand)

21 November 2025
13:00

| Gulf Komara Futsal Club (Papua New Guinea) | 1–8 | (New Caledonia) AS PTT |
|---|---|---|
| Regy 39' | Report | Qenegie 2'; Pei 3'; Hmaen 18', 23'; Upa 25'; Namuli 37', 38' |

Vodafone Arena, Suva, Fiji
Attendance: 50
Referee: Philip Mana (Solomon Islands)
21 November 2025
16:00

| Mataks FC (Solomon Islands) | 8–5 | (Vanuatu) Southern Legions FC |
|---|---|---|
| Kasute'e 6'; Misitana 9'; Do'oro 14', 38'; Mana 17', 39'; Lema 30'; Bunabo 37' | Report | Bule 3'; Berukilukilu 15'; Karlip 18', 26'; Sovuai 30' |

Vodafone Arena, Suva, Fiji
Referee: Benjamin Norman (New Zealand)
21 November 2025
19:00

| Waikato Rapids (New Zealand) | 6–3 | (Fiji) Suva Futsal Club |
|---|---|---|
| Carter 3'; Dixon 4', 12'; Robinson 14'; Howard 29'; Sharplin 35' | Report | Merrill 18', 27'; Carter 31' (o.g.) |

Vodafone Arena, Suva, Fiji
Attendance: 100
Referee: Wahyu Wickasono (Indonesia)

== Fifth place play-off ==
23 November 2025
13:00

| Suva Futsal Club (Fiji) | 4–3 | (Papua New Guinea) Gulf Komara Futsal Club |
|---|---|---|
| Willie Gerega 19' (o.g.); Chand 21'; Baravilala 32'; Nand 33' | Report | Vela 0', 16'; Manu 32' |

Vodafone Arena, Suva, Fiji
Attendance: 100
Referee: Jone Ridge Ue (New Caledonia)

== Third place play-off ==
23 November 2025
16:00

| AS PTT (New Caledonia) | 7–2 | (Vanuatu) Southern Legions FC |
|---|---|---|
| Namuli 7', 15'; Jymaël 11', 16'; Gnahou 18'; Hmaen 20'; Robert 33' | Report | Timatua 17'; Naviti 37' |

Vodafone Arena, Suva, Fiji
Attendance: 103
Referee: Chris Sinclair (New Zealand)

== Final ==
23 November 2025
19:00

| Waikato Rapids (New Zealand) | 4–4 (a.e.t.) | (Solomon Islands) Mataks FC |
|---|---|---|
| Ericksen 1', 28'; Bordin 7', 13' | Report | Do'oro 0', 8'; Bunabo 21'; Kasute'e 25' |
Penalties
| Innes (penalty scored); Sharplin (penalty scored); Carter (penalty scored); Vhavha (penalty missed); Ericksen (penalty scored); Robson (penalty scored); Wink (penalty scored); Broadhurst (penalty scored); Dixon (penalty missed) | 7–8 | (penalty scored) Mana; (penalty missed) Bunabo; (penalty scored) Do'oro; (penalty scored) Lema; (penalty scored) Misitana; (penalty scored) Broadhurst; (penalty scored) Mana; (penalty scored) Kindiole; (penalty scored) Poepoe |

Vodafone Arena, Suva, Fiji
Attendance: 196
Referee: Wahyu Wickasono (Indonesia)

== Broadcasting ==
All matches were broadcast live on FIFA+.
