= Solomon Islands women's national futsal team =

Women's national futsal team representing the Solomon Islands

Solomon Islands
- Association: Solomon Islands Football Federation
- Confederation: OFC (Oceania)
- Head coach: Arthur Barko
- FIFA code: SOL
- FIFA ranking: 74 ▼1 (4 April 2025)

First international
- Tahiti 5–1 Solomon Islands (Honiara, Solomon Islands, 18 August 2024)

Biggest win
- Tonga 0–2 Solomon Islands (Honiara, Solomon Islands, 20 August 2024)

Biggest defeat
- Solomon Islands 0–4 New Zealand (Honiara, Solomon Islands, 22 August 2024); Solomon Islands 2–6 Fiji (Honiara, Solomon Islands, 23 August 2024)

The Solomon Islands women's national futsal team represents the Solomon Islands in international women's futsal competitions and is controlled by the Solomon Islands Football Federation.

== History ==
The first ever Solomon Islands women's national futsal team formed for the purpose of the 2024 OFC Futsal Women's Nations Cup . The tournament hosted at home was team's first major competition. Their first match against Tahiti on 18 August 2024 which the team lost 1–5 was their first ever international. They finished fourth in the tournament.

== Tournament record ==
=== FIFA Futsal Women's World Cup ===
FIFA Futsal Women's World Cup record
Year	Round	Position	GP	W	D	L	GS	GA
(Philippines) 2025	Did not qualify							
Total	–	0/1	0	0	0	0	0	0

=== OFC Futsal Women's Nations Cup ===
OFC Futsal Women's Nations Cup record
Year	Round	Position	GP	W	D	L	GF	GA
(Solomon Islands) 2024	Fourth place	4/5	5	1	0	4	8	19
Total	1 title	1/1	5	1	0	4	8	19
