= New Zealand women's national futsal team =

Women's national futsal team representing New Zealand

New Zealand
- Nickname(s): Futsal Ferns
- Association: New Zealand Football (NZF)
- Confederation: OFC (Oceania)
- Head coach: Nic Downes
- FIFA code: NZL
- FIFA ranking: 29 (24 September 2026)
| Home colours | Away colours |

First international
- New Zealand 14–0 New Caledonia (Tauranga, New Zealand; 12 September 2017)

Biggest win
- New Zealand 15–0 New Caledonia (Tauranga, New Zealand; 13 September 2017)

Biggest defeat
- Brazil 12–0 New Zealand (Nakhon Ratchasima, Thailand; 23 November 2025)

FIFA Futsal Women's World Cup
- Appearances: 1 (First in 2025)
- Best result: Group stage (2025)

OFC Futsal Women's Nations Cup
- Appearances: 1 (First in 2024)
- Best result: Champions (2024)

The New Zealand women's national futsal team represents New Zealand in international women's futsal competitions and is controlled by the New Zealand Football.

== History ==
The New Zealand Football would launch the first women's national futsal team in 2017. At around this time, the federation has already been organizing the National Women's Futsal League.

Their debut game, and the first ever women's futsal international in Oceania was held on 12 September 2023 at the ASB Baypark Arena in Tauranga. The Futsal Ferns would win 14–0 against New Caledonia. The match which is part of the Trans Pacific Futsal Cup at the AIMS Games was followed by two more matches against the same opposition.

On 25 August 2024, New Zealand became the first-ever women's national futsal team to qualify for the first-ever FIFA Futsal Women's World Cup staged in the Philippines.

== Results and fixtures ==
=== 2017 ===
| 12 September 2017 Trans Pacific Futsal Cup | New Zealand | 14–0 | New Caledonia | Tauranga, New Zealand |
| | | Report | | Stadium: ASB Baypark Arena |

| 13 September 2017 Trans Pacific Futsal Cup | New Zealand | 15–0 | New Caledonia | Tauranga, New Zealand |
| | | Report | | Stadium: ASB Baypark Arena |

| 14 September 2017 Trans Pacific Futsal Cup | New Zealand | 9–2 | New Caledonia | Tauranga, New Zealand |
| | | Report | | Stadium: ASB Baypark Arena |

=== 2019 ===
| 7 September 2019 2019 CFA Four Nations Women’s Futsal Tournament | China | 8–3 | New Zealand | Chengdu, China |
| 14:00 | | Report |

| 8 September 2019 2019 CFA Four Nations Women’s Futsal Tournament | New Zealand | 1–4 | Thailand | Chengdu, China |
| 16:30 | | Report |

| 10 September 2019 2019 CFA Four Nations Women’s Futsal Tournament | Kuwait | 0–4 | New Zealand | Chengdu, China |
| 16:30 | | Report |

=== 2023 ===
| 18 October 2023 2023 PFF Women’s Tri-Nation Futsal Invitational | Indonesia | 3–1 | New Zealand | Manila, Philippines |
| 16:00 | | Report | | Stadium: Ninoy Aquino Stadium |

| 20 October 2023 PFF Women's Tri Nation Futsal Invitational | New Zealand | 4–1 | Philippines | Manila, Philippines |
| 18:00 | Manak 9'; Nicholson 15'; Kraakman 23'; Gillion 29' | Report | Ortillo 3' | Stadium: Ninoy Aquino Stadium |

| 21 October 2023 PFF Women's Tri Nation Futsal Invitational | New Zealand | 0–1 (a.e.t.) | Philippines | Manila, Philippines |
| 16:00 | | | Rebosura 2' | Stadium: Ninoy Aquino Stadium |

=== 2024 ===
| 17 August 2024 2024 OFC Futsal Women's Nations Cup | New Zealand | 10–0 | Tonga | Honiara, Solomon Islands |
| 15:00 | Leong 01:56, 07:55; Kraakman 03:26; Evans 10:03; Cooper 13:04; Bloomfield 31:33; Anthony 34:21; Bremner 37:20; Catherwood 39:36; Boobyer 39:47 | Report | | Stadium: Friendship Hall, Honiara; Attendance: 500; Referee: Arnaud Llambrich (New Caledonia) |

| 20 August 2024 2024 OFC Futsal Women's Nations Cup | Fiji | 1–9 | New Zealand | Honiara, Solomon Islands |
| 15:00 | Likuculacula 26:21 | Report | Catherwood 02:42, 19:20; Veronika 05:43 (o.g.); Manak 13:54, 30:48; Cooper 17:14; Leong 29:41; Bloomfield 36:20; Kraakman 39:19 | Stadium: Friendship Hall, Honiara; Attendance: 300; Referee: Arnaud Llambrich (New Caledonia) |

| 22 August 2024 2024 OFC Futsal Women's Nations Cup | Solomon Islands | 0–4 | New Zealand | Honiara, Solomon Islands |
| 17:00 | | Report | Kraakman 01:20; Bremner 14:06; Boobyer 22:01, 29:35 | Stadium: Friendship Hall, Honiara; Attendance: 350; Referee: Arnaud Llambrich (New Caledonia) |

| 22 August 2024 2024 OFC Futsal Women's Nations Cup | New Zealand | 6–1 | Tahiti | Honiara, Solomon Islands |
| 17:00 | Kraakman 01:41; Manak 17:38; Catherwood 20:09, 28:24, 36:21; Evans 31:44 | Report | Hioe 37:56 | Stadium: Friendship Hall, Honiara; Attendance: 250; Referee: Philip Mana (Solomon Islands) |

| 25 August 2024 2024 OFC Futsal Women's Nations Cup Final | New Zealand | 7–1 | Fiji | Honiara, Solomon Islands |
| 17:00 | Kraakman 1:44, 33:20; Boobyer 9:47; Leong 27:04; Bremner 28:51; Manak 35:56; Diyalowai 37:58 (o.g.) | Report | Likuculacula 18:53 | Stadium: Friendship Hall, Honiara; Attendance: 1,000; Referee: Philip Mana (Solomon Islands) |

=== 2025 ===
| 9 April 2025 Friendly | China | 1–0 | New Zealand | Hohhot, China |
| 19:30 CST | Yinglan | Report | | Stadium: Hohhot Sports Centre |

| 11 April 2025 Friendly | China | 5–5 (5–6 p) | New Zealand | Hohhot, China |
| 19:30 CST | | Report | Anthony; Kraakman; Boobyer | Stadium: Hohhot Sports Centre |

| 13 April 2025 Friendly | China | 5–2 | New Zealand | Hohhot, China |
| 19:30 CST | | Report | Nicholson; Williams | Stadium: Hohhot Sports Centre |

| 25 October 2025 Friendly | Brazil | 9–0 | New Zealand | Lages, Brazil |
| | | Report | | Stadium: Ginásio Jones Minosso |

| 27 October 2025 Friendly | Brazil | 10–0 | New Zealand | Lages, Brazil |
| | | Report | | Stadium: Ginásio Jones Minosso |

| 12 November 2025 SAT Women's Futsal Championship | New Zealand | 2–3 | Thailand | Thailand |
| | Jordana Bremner; Jamie Evans | Report | Goal |

| 14 November 2025 SAT Women's Futsal Championship | Brazil | 12–0 | New Zealand | Thailand |
| | Luciléia Minuzzo; Ana Luiza; Débora Vanin; Diana Santos; Simone Sindy; Luana Rodrigues; Natalinha; Emilly Marcondes | Report |

| 18 November 2025 Friendly | Iran | 6–1 | New Zealand | Pasig, Philippines |
| | Nasimeh Gholami; Fereshteh Khosravi; Mahsa Kamali; Mahtab Banaei; Elham Anafjeh | Report | Hannah Kraakman | Stadium: Ynares Sports Arena |

=== 2026 ===
| 12 November 2026 Friendly | Vietnam | 2–3 | New Zealand | Ho Chi Minh City, Vietnam |
| 17:00 | | | | Stadium: Chánh Hưng Ward Arena |

| 14 November 2026 Friendly | Vietnam | 4–2 | New Zealand | Ho Chi Minh City, Vietnam |
| 17:00 | | | | Stadium: Chánh Hưng Ward Arena |

== Tournament record ==
=== FIFA Futsal Women's World Cup ===
FIFA Futsal Women's World Cup record
| Year | Result | Pld | W | D* | L | GF | GA |
|---|---|---|---|---|---|---|---|
| (Philippines) 2025 | Group stage | 3 | 0 | 0 | 3 | 2 | 20 |
| Total | 1/1 | 3 | 0 | 0 | 3 | 2 | 20 |

*Draws include knockout matches decided on penalty kicks.

=== OFC Futsal Women's Nations Cup ===
OFC Futsal Women's Nations Cup record
| Year | Round | Position | GP | W | D | L | GF | GA |
|---|---|---|---|---|---|---|---|---|
| (Solomon Islands) 2024 | Champions | 1st | 5 | 5 | 0 | 0 | 36 | 3 |
| Total | 1 title | 1/1 | 5 | 5 | 0 | 0 | 36 | 3 |
