= OFC Futsal Women's Nations Cup =

- Organiser(s): OFC
- Founded: 2023
- Region: Oceania
- Teams: 11
- Current champions: New Zealand (1st title)
- Most championships: New Zealand (1 title)
- Broadcaster: FIFA+
- 2024 OFC Futsal Women's Nations Cup

The OFC Futsal Women's Nations Cup is an international women's futsal championship for Oceania organized by OFC. The competition was created alongside the FIFA Futsal Women's World Cup and will serve as qualifying for the competition. The champions of the tournament will qualify for the competition.

The inaugural edition took place in the Solomon Islands from 18 to 24 August 2024, and New Zealand won the title.

== Format ==
A format has yet to be announced for the competition.

== Summary ==
Year	Host	Final			Third place Game		
Year	Host	Champion	Score	Second place	Third place	Score	Fourth place
2024; Details	(Solomon Islands); Honiara	New Zealand	7–1	Fiji	Tahiti	4–3	Solomon Islands
