= OFC Futsal Men's Champions League =

- Organiser(s): OFC
- Founded: 2019; 7 years ago
- Region: Oceania
- Teams: 6
- Current champions: (Solomon Islands) Mataks FC (1st title)
- Most championships: (Solomon Islands) Kooline (New Caledonia) AS PTT (Solomon Islands) Mataks FC (1 title each)
- Broadcaster: FIFA+
- 2025 OFC Futsal Champions League

The OFC Futsal Champions League is a futsal competition for Oceanian club teams organized by the Oceania Football Confederation (OFC). The first edition was held in December 2019 in New Zealand, with the champion futsal clubs from six nations represented.

Initially intended to be held annually, both the 2020 and 2021 editions were cancelled due to the COVID-19 pandemic. The next edition in 2022 was brought forward from December to October before being cancelled. The next edition was in November 2025 in Fiji.

== Summaries ==
Key
*	Match was won on a penalty shoot-out

List of OFC Futsal Champions League finals
Season	Country	Winners	Score	Runners-up	Country	Venue	Attendance
2019	Solomon Islands	Kooline	7–5	AS PTT	New Caledonia	Barfoot & Thompson Stadium, Auckland, New Zealand	
2020	Cancelled due to COVID-19 pandemic (originally scheduled for December)						
2021	Cancelled due to COVID-19 pandemic (originally tentatively scheduled for 2–5 December)						
2024	New Caledonia	AS PTT	4–3	Mataks FC	Solomon Islands	L'Arene du Sud, Païta, New Caledonia	2,000
2025	Solomon Islands	Mataks FC	4–4 (Note: Score was 4–4 after 40 minutes and extra time. Mataks FC won the penalty shoot-out 8–7.)	Waikato Rapids	New Zealand	Vodafone Arena, Suva, Fiji	196

== See also ==
- OFC Futsal Championship
