= 2019 OFC Futsal Champions League =

Tournament details
- Host country: New Zealand
- City: Auckland
- Dates: 5–8 December 2019
- Teams: 6 (from 6 associations)
- Venue: 1 (in 1 host city)

Final positions
- Champions: (Solomon Islands) Kooline (1st title)
- Runners-up: (New Caledonia) AS PTT
- Third place: (New Zealand) AFF Futsal
- Fourth place: (French Polynesia) AS Pirae Futsal

Tournament statistics
- Matches played: 18
- Goals scored: 132 (7.33 per match)
- Top scorer: Benjamin Mana (8 goals)
- Best player: Christ Pei
- Best young player: Adam Larce-Paulsen
- Best goalkeeper: Joseph Haoata
- Fair play award: AFF Futsal

The 2019 OFC Futsal Champions League was the first edition of the OFC Futsal Champions League, an international futsal club tournament in Oceania organised by the Oceania Football Confederation (OFC). It was held in Auckland, New Zealand between 5–8 December 2019.

== Teams ==
The champion futsal teams from six OFC member associations entered the competition.

Association	Team
Fiji	Suva Futsal
New Caledonia	AS PTT
New Zealand (hosts)	AFF Futsal
Solomon Islands	Kooline
Tahiti	AS Pirae Futsal
Vanuatu	D’York Street

== Venue ==
The matches were played at the Barfoot & Thompson Stadium in Auckland.

== Group stage ==
Pos	Team	Pld	W	D	L	GF	GA	GD	Pts	Qualification
1	(Solomon Islands) Kooline	5	4	1	0	28	8	+20	13	Final
2	(New Caledonia) AS PTT	5	3	2	0	21	13	+8	11	Final
3	(New Zealand) AFF Futsal (H)	5	2	2	1	25	11	+14	8	Third place match
4	(French Polynesia) AS Pirae Futsal	5	2	1	2	22	15	+7	7	Third place match
5	(Vanuatu) D’York Street	5	1	0	4	7	23	−16	3	Fifth place match
6	(Fiji) Suva Futsal	5	0	0	5	4	37	−33	0	Fifth place match

Source: OFC
(H) Hosts

Times are NZDT (UTC+13).

5 December 2020
16:00

AS Pirae Futsal (French Polynesia)	1–4	(Solomon Islands) Kooline
	Report

Barfoot & Thompson Stadium, Auckland
Attendance: 100
5 December 2020
18:00

Suva Futsal (Fiji)	1–3	(Vanuatu) D’York Street
	Report

Barfoot & Thompson Stadium, Auckland
Attendance: 120
5 December 2020
20:30

AFF Futsal (New Zealand)	3–3	(New Caledonia) AS PTT
	Report

Barfoot & Thompson Stadium, Auckland
Attendance: 140

6 December 2020
10:00

AS Pirae Futsal (French Polynesia)	5–6	(New Caledonia) AS PTT
	Report

Barfoot & Thompson Stadium, Auckland
Attendance: 80
6 December 2020
12:00

D’York Street (Vanuatu)	1–6	(New Zealand) AFF Futsal
	Report

Barfoot & Thompson Stadium, Auckland
Attendance: 80
6 December 2020
14:00

Suva Futsal (Fiji)	1–10	(Solomon Islands) Kooline
	Report

Barfoot & Thompson Stadium, Auckland
Attendance: 50

6 December 2020
16:00

AS PTT (New Caledonia)	4–1	(Vanuatu) D’York Street
	Report

Barfoot & Thompson Stadium, Auckland
Attendance: 80
6 December 2020
18:00

AS Pirae Futsal (French Polynesia)	8–1	(Fiji) Suva Futsal
	Report

Barfoot & Thompson Stadium, Auckland
Attendance: 50
6 December 2020
20:00

AFF Futsal (New Zealand)	1–3	(Solomon Islands) Kooline
	Report

Barfoot & Thompson Stadium, Auckland
Attendance: 150

7 December 2020
10:00

Kooline (Solomon Islands)	4–4	(New Caledonia) AS PTT
	Report

Barfoot & Thompson Stadium, Auckland
Attendance: 50
7 December 2020
12:00

Suva Futsal (Fiji)	1–12	(New Zealand) AFF Futsal
	Report

Barfoot & Thompson Stadium, Auckland
Attendance: 50
7 December 2020
14:00

D’York Street (Vanuatu)	1–5	(French Polynesia) AS Pirae Futsal
	Report

Barfoot & Thompson Stadium, Auckland
Attendance: 50

7 December 2020
16:00

AS PTT (New Caledonia)	4–0	(Fiji) Suva Futsal
	Report

Barfoot & Thompson Stadium, Auckland
Attendance: 100
7 December 2020
18:00

D’York Street (Vanuatu)	1–7	(Solomon Islands) Kooline
	Report

Barfoot & Thompson Stadium, Auckland
Attendance: 80
7 December 2020
20:00

AS Pirae Futsal (French Polynesia)	3–3	(New Zealand) AFF Futsal
	Report

Barfoot & Thompson Stadium, Auckland
Attendance: 80

== Final stage ==
=== Fifth place match ===
8 December 2020
10:00

D’York Street (Vanuatu)	3–3	(Fiji) Suva Futsal
Penalties
	1–3

Barfoot & Thompson Stadium, Auckland

=== Third place match ===
8 December 2020
12:00

AFF Futsal (New Zealand)	7–0	(French Polynesia) AS Pirae Futsal

Barfoot & Thompson Stadium, Auckland

=== Final ===
8 December 2020
14:30

Kooline (Solomon Islands)	7–5	(New Caledonia) AS PTT

Barfoot & Thompson Stadium, Auckland

== Awards ==
The following awards were given at the conclusion of the competition:

- Fair Play Award: AFF Futsal
- Golden Gloves: Joseph Haoata (AS Pirae Futsal)
- Golden Boot: Benjamin Mana (Kooline) – 8 goals
- Atta Elayyan Award – Young Player of the Tournament: Adam Larce-Paulsen (AFF Futsal)
- Golden Boot: Christ Pei (AS PTT)
