= Fiji women's national futsal team =

Women's national futsal team representing Fiji

Fiji
- Association: Fiji Football Association
- Confederation: OFC (Oceania)
- Head coach: Jerry Sam
- FIFA code: FIJ
- FIFA ranking: 62 (4 April 2025)

First international
- Tahiti 1–2 Fiji (Honiara, Solomon Islands, 17 August 2024)

Biggest win
- Fiji 4–0 Tonga (Honiara, Solomon Islands, 18 August 2024); Solomon Islands 2–6 Fiji (Honiara, Solomon Islands, 23 August 2024)

Biggest defeat
- Fiji 1–9 New Zealand (Honiara, Solomon Islands, 20 August 2024)

The Fiji women's national futsal team represents Fiji in international women's futsal competitions and is controlled by the Fiji Football Association.

== History ==
The first Fiji women's national futsal team was formed for the 2024 OFC Futsal Women's Nations Cup in the Solomon Islands. Women's futsal in Fiji was promoted by Solomon Islander Jerry Sam, who was the team's head coach for their first ever tournament.

Fiji won 2–1 in their debut match against Tahiti in the opener of the Women's Nations Cup. They barely qualified for the inaugural 2025 FIFA Futsal Women's World Cup, losing to New Zealand in the final.

== Tournament record ==
=== FIFA Futsal Women's World Cup ===
FIFA Futsal Women's World Cup record
Year	Round	Position	GP	W	D	L	GS	GA
(Philippines) 2025	Did not qualify							
Total	–	0/1	0	0	0	0	0	0

=== OFC Futsal Women's Nations Cup ===
OFC Futsal Women's Nations Cup record
Year	Round	Position	GP	W	D	L	GS	GA
(Solomon Islands) 2024	Runners-up	2nd	5	3	0	2	14	19
Total	–	1/1	5	3	0	2	14	19

== Head coach ==
- (Solomon Islands) Jerry Sam (2024–)
