= Oceania Football Confederation =

International governing body for association football in Oceania

- Abbreviation: OFC
- Formation: 1966; 60 years ago
- Type: Sports organisation
- Headquarters: Auckland, New Zealand
- Region served: Oceania (excluding Australia, Northern Mariana Islands, and Guam)
- Members: 13 member associations (11 full members)
- Official language: English
- President: Lambert Maltock
- Vice presidents: Thierry Ariiotima; John Kapi Natto; Lord Ve'ehala
- General secretary: Franck Castillo
- Parent organisation: FIFA
- Website: OceaniaFootball.com

The Oceania Football Confederation (OFC) is one of the six FIFA-recognised continental confederations of international association football. The OFC has 13 member associations, 11 of which are full members and two which are associate members not affiliated with FIFA. The OFC promotes football in Oceania and allows its member nations to qualify for the FIFA World Cup.

OFC is predominantly made up of island nations where association football is not the most popular sport, with low GDP and low population meaning very little money is generated by the OFC nations. The OFC has little influence in the wider football world, either in terms of international competition or as a source of players for high-profile club competitions. OFC is the only confederation to have no international titles, the best result being then-member Australia making the final of the 1997 FIFA Confederations Cup.

In 2006, Football Federation Australia, representing the OFC's then-largest and most successful nation, left for a second time to join the Asian Football Confederation, leaving New Zealand Football as the largest federation within the OFC. Since then, New Zealand have served as the dominant force in Oceanian football, winning every FIFA World Cup qualification tournament and all but one OFC Nations Cups in that span.

OFC runs club competitions such as the Champions League and the Pro League, whose inaugural season began in January 2026. Northern League side Auckland City are widely considered to be the most successful club in the region, winning a record 13 Champions Leagues and routinely represent the continent in the FIFA Club World Cup. Prior to the establishment of the Pro League, Auckland FC and Wellington Phoenix were the region's only professional clubs and have played as expatriate members in Australia's A-League. In the past year, S-League side Real Kakamora have established a significantly-sized international fanbase due to their notable on-field results and social media presence and are also considered to be one of the most popular clubs in the region.

The president of OFC is Lambert Maltock since April 2018. The vice presidents are Thierry Ariiotima, John Kapi Natto and Lord Ve'ehala while Franck Castillo is the general secretary. The confederation is headquartered in Auckland, New Zealand.

== History ==
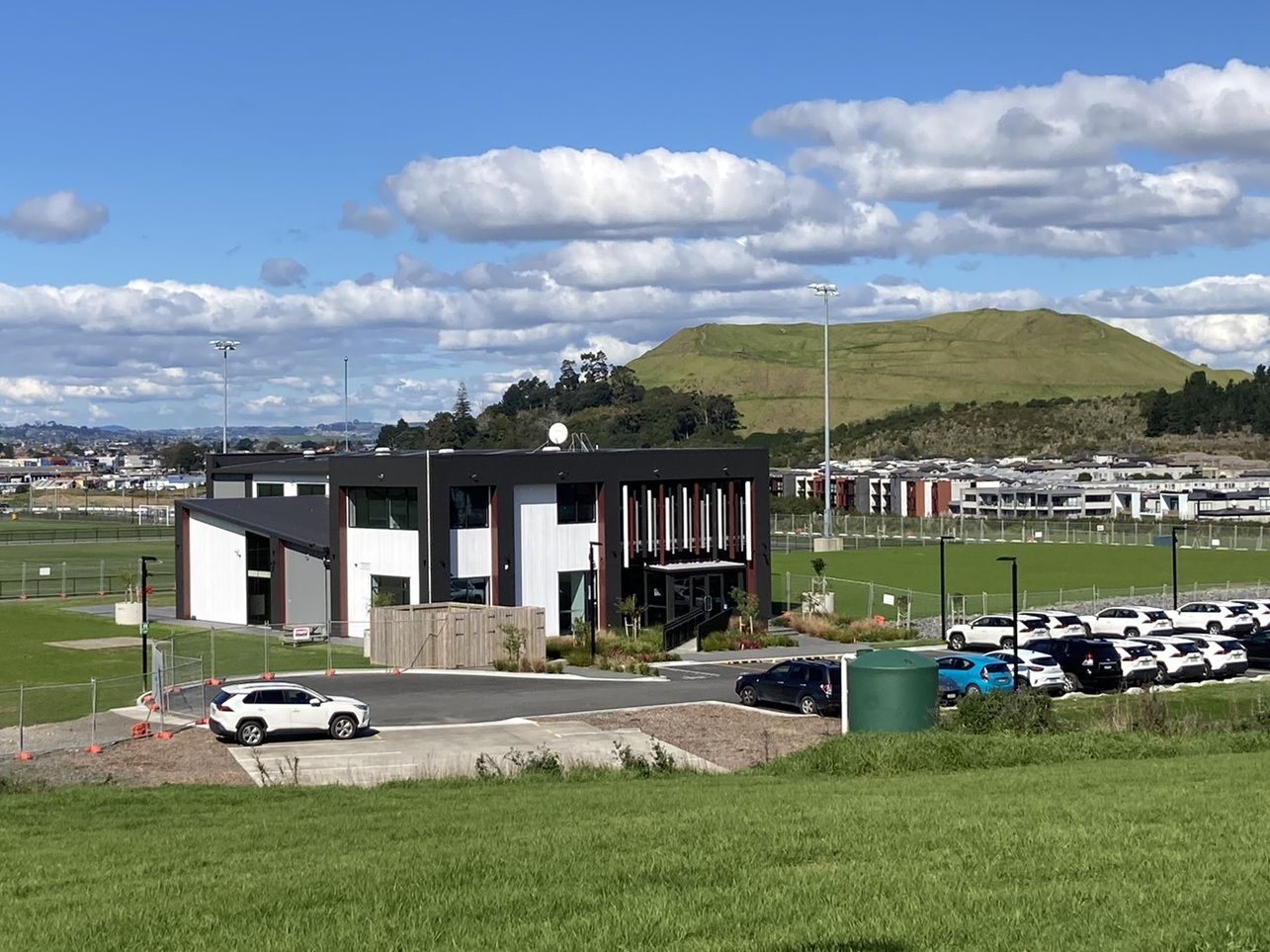
OFC Home of Football in Ngahue Reserve, Auckland, New Zealand

The confederation formed in 1966 with the purpose of representing countries in the Pacific, following Australia and New Zealand's failed attempts to join the Asian Football Confederation (AFC). The idea of forming a Pacific confederation was first raised in 1964. This proposal was pushed by Sid Guppy of the New Zealand Football Association (NZFA), Jim Bayutti of the Australian Soccer Federation and then-FIFA president Stanley Rous, with Guppy and Bayutti both being spurred on by the AFC's rejections. After initial discussions were held in Tokyo in 1964, Scottish-born Charlie Dempsey was approached by the NZFA to work with Bayutti in putting together the bid to create the Oceania Football Confederation. The two garnered enough support for their bid to be approved by FIFA's congress in 1966. The founding OFC members were the following:

- the Australian Soccer Federation (subsequently rebranded Football Australia in 2005)
- New Zealand Football Association (also known as New Zealand Soccer: subsequently rebranded New Zealand Football)
- the Fiji Football Association
- the Papua New Guinea Football Association

Representatives from New Caledonia were also involved in the 1966 OFC founding, but New Caledonia could only be a provisional member, as the territory did not have sporting autonomy from France at that time.

Australia resigned as an OFC member in 1972 to again pursue membership with the AFC, but rejoined the OFC in 1978, and were never official members of the AFC during the 1970s. After the 1972 departure from the OFC, Lou Gautier of Australian publication Soccer World said, "[we] have contended from the very start that the conception of an Oceania Confederation was a pipe dream, with no tangible advantages for Australian soccer." Bayutti resigned from the OFC in 1970, in preparation for Australia's planned move to the AFC, with Charles Dempsey being appointed OFC acting secretary as a result. Dempsey also served as the head of the New Zealand national body. Dempsey remained the OFC acting secretary for the next ten years, and he was eventually elected president in 1982. Previous presidents included New Zealanders William Walkley and Jack Cowie, and Australians Vic Tuting and Arthur George. Dempsey served as president until 2000, and he convinced smaller Pacific states to join the confederation, including Samoa (in 1986), Vanuatu (in 1988), Tahiti (in 1990), Tonga and the Cook Islands (both in 1994) and American Samoa (in 1998). Dempsey is currently the last OFC president to have been based in either New Zealand or Australia, with all subsequent presidents having emerged from other countries in the Pacific.

Australia's men's national team (nicknamed the Socceroos) became the first representatives from the area to play at a FIFA World Cup in 1974, being drawn in the same group as Chile, East Germany and hosts and eventual champions West Germany. They failed to score a goal, but were still competitive in all three of their matches. New Zealand's national team the All Whites played in their first World Cup eight years later. At the 1982 tournament they suffered heavier defeats than Australia previously had.

From the 1960s to the early 1980s, OFC countries competed alongside AFC nations in various different mixed World Cup qualifying tournaments. It was not until the 1986 qualifiers that the OFC had their own distinct qualifying tournament. Chinese Taipei was an OFC member from 1975 to 1989. The island state is geographically situated in the north Pacific, off the coast of China, but was a member for political reasons, later joining the AFC. Israel (who were never a member) competed in the 1986 and 1990 OFC World Cup qualifiers for similar political reasons, despite not being located in the Pacific Basin. Australia lost several inter-confederation World Cup playoffs throughout the 1980s and 1990s; first to Scotland in 1985, then Argentina in 1993 and then Iran in 1997. The only time Australia did not reach the inter-confederation playoff during this period was in 1989, when Israel qualified ahead of Australia in the second round of OFC qualifiers, eventually losing to Colombia. The closest of the Australian defeats in the inter-confederation playoffs came against Iran in 1997. Australia were leading 3–1 on aggregate late during the second leg in Melbourne, but their momentum was interrupted when serial pitch invader Peter Hore entered the ground. They went on to concede two goals in quick succession, failing to qualify on the away goals rule. FIFA confirmed OFC as a full confederation in 1996, and granted it a seat on the FIFA executive. In 1998 the OFC unveiled a new logo and an official magazine, entitled The Wave.

Australia's national team were long considered the biggest challenge in the confederation. There were many highly uncompetitive matches involving them, particularly in the 1990s and 2000s. Their June 1997 second round qualification games for the 1998 FIFA World Cup included a 13–0 defeat of Solomon Islands. The following year they defeated the Cook Islands 16–0 at the 1998 OFC Nations Cup, while at the 2000 OFC Nations Cup they defeated them 17–0. Australia's dominance extended to women's competitions as well. For example, at the 1998 OFC Women's Championship, their women's team The Matildas defeated Fiji 17–0 and American Samoa 21–0. The uncompetitive results escalated in April 2001, during the first round of OFC qualifiers for the 2002 FIFA World Cup. Australia beat Tonga 22–0, following this result up with a 31–0 win over American Samoa and an 11–0 win over Samoa. The American Samoa game became the largest international victory in the history of the sport (breaking the previous record set in the Tonga game), while Archie Thompson also broke the record for most goals in an international match, scoring 13.

Australia's record-breaking form in the early stages of qualifying ultimately could not be replicated in their inter-confederation playoff against Uruguay later that year. For the first leg, the Socceroos managed to defeat the South Americans 1–0 in front of a Melbourne crowd of 84,656, but they were overwhelmed 3–0 in the away leg. The away leg was marred by an incident at Montevideo's airport prior to the game itself, where the Australian players were spat on, punched and abused by a mob of Uruguayan fans. On 24 May 2004, New Caledonia became the 12th member of the OFC.

Australia reached another inter-confederation playoff against Uruguay in late 2005. As well as in 2001, both sides won a game each over the two legs, which led to Australia finally ending their World Cup drought through a dramatic penalty shootout in Sydney. The Socceroos were granted increased security for the first away leg, as a response to the 2001 airport incident, and in the second leg the Uruguayan team were heavily booed while their national anthem played. In the 2006 FIFA World Cup, Australia were eliminated by eventual champions Italy during the Round of 16. Their 3–1 group stage victory against Japan remains the only time a team representing OFC has won at the tournament. Australia left the OFC again that same year and joined the Asian Football Confederation. The AFC deal had been struck in June 2005, before Australia beat Uruguay to qualify for the 2006 World Cup. The deal came into effect on 1 January 2006, although Australia were still officially representing the OFC at that year's World Cup. Once Australia joined the AFC in 2006, they began an unsuccessful bid for the 2018 and 2022 World Cups, and the fact that the south Pacific area had never hosted the World Cup was one of the bid's selling points. Australian football chief John O'Neill said in July 2006, "the one part of the world that's never hosted the World Cup, after South Africa has hosted in 2010, is the Pacific Basin. We belong to Asia now but we're also part of the Pacific, and I think the equity issue about the Pacific region not having hosted should be in our favour." Australia and New Zealand would later co-host the 2023 FIFA Women's World Cup together, despite being members of two separate confederations at the time.

In 2008, an associate member, the Northern Mariana Islands Football Association, also left the OFC and in 2009 joined the AFC as an associate member. In late 2009, the Palau Football Association, geographically a part of Oceania but with no official ties to the OFC, also applied for the same status with the AFC as the Northern Mariana Islands association but was not successful. New Zealand ended their own World Cup drought in 2009 when they defeated Bahrain to qualify for the 2010 FIFA World Cup. The tournament coincidentally also featured Australia, who were now representing the AFC. New Zealand were the only unbeaten team at the tournament, despite failing to advance past the group stage. With Australia's absence, New Zealand began having a regular presence in World Cup inter-confederation playoffs. They were convincingly defeated by Mexico over two legs in 2013, and narrowly missed out to Peru in 2017 and Costa Rica in 2022. On 24 March 2025, New Zealand qualified for the 2026 edition after defeating New Caledonia 3–0 in the final game of the new OFC qualification tournament, which has one guaranteed spot for the OFC.

In November 2024, the OFC revealed plans to launch a five month long OFC Professional League, beginning in January 2026. The inaugural competition intended to feature eight of the top clubs from various Pacific nations, including potential teams from Australia and Hawaii (whose clubs would normally compete under CONCACAF due to Hawaii being part of the United States). 32 clubs expressed a desire to participate, including four Australian clubs and teams from New Caledonia, New Zealand, Fiji, Papua New Guinea, Samoa, the Solomon Islands and Tahiti. The Australian clubs included the Marconi Stallions, South Melbourne FC and Sunshine Coast Fire, who all compete outside of Australia's national A-League competition, which was founded around the time Australia joined the AFC. Clubs from non-OFC countries which seek to join have to pay for their own travel and accommodation, and will not have access to the FIFA Club World Cup if they win the competition. The competition was expected to replace the pre-existing OFC Champions League, which has been run since 1987. A New Zealand-based club in Australia's A-League, Auckland FC, expressed a desire to participate, with a reason for this being since they cannot qualify for the Asian Champions League by winning the A-League, since New Zealand is an OFC country. Additionally, two other New Zealand-based clubs which compete outside of the A-League also publicly expressed a desire to participate, with those teams being Christchurch United and Nelson Suburbs. Applicant clubs had to show they were financially sustainable for four years and meet key specifications, including financial, sporting, infrastructure, personnel and legal criteria. In May 2025, it was confirmed the OFC had chosen 13 potential teams for the final Club Licensing phase, with two of the 13 teams being Australian, and the other 11 being from OFC nations. The final list of eight clubs for the inaugural OFC Pro League was officially announced on October 29, 2025 by the Oceania Football Confederation, and included clubs from Australia, Fiji, New Zealand, Papua New Guinea, Solomon Islands, Tahit and Vanuatu.

== Criticism ==
Throughout the OFC's history, there have been numerous calls to either merge it with the AFC, or dissolve the OFC and have its members join the AFC, in order to form an Asia-Pacific Football Confederation. The calls grew louder in 2003 when FIFA reversed a decision to grant Oceania an automatic spot at the World Cup. Australia's lack of World Cup participation prior to 2006 has been blamed by many on the OFC qualification process, with football writer Matthew Hall stating in 2003, "For World Cup qualification, the Socceroos will win games by cricket scores and then face a sudden-death play-off against a desperate, battle-hardened opponent given a second, or even third, life."

A major reason for Australia's 2006 switch to the AFC was the unpredictable nature of the mandatory inter-confederation playoffs. Australia and New Zealand's 1974 and 1982 qualifications both came in qualifying tournaments where OFC teams were competing alongside AFC teams; the two countries did not have a playoff with a team from outside these two confederations. When the OFC was given a separate qualification process for the 1986 World Cup, their teams lost five consecutive inter-confederation playoffs (usually against South American nations), with Australia being involved in four of the five losses. Another reason cited for Australia's move was their dominance against the smaller OFC teams, which was causing political tension within the confederation. When announcing Australia's move in June 2005, then-FIFA president Sepp Blatter remarked, "the Oceania delegates have thought for many years that Australia was too powerful and blocked the way of the other 11 countries. Now New Zealand, and the Pacific islands at least have a chance."

In 2005, shortly before Australia left the OFC, there was an unsuccessful proposal to merge the AFC and the OFC. The plan was to divide Asia into two distinct confederations. A new Asia-Pacific confederation would have encompassed the OFC nations (including Australia) and AFC nations to the east of India and Bangladesh, or alternatively, to the east of Cambodia, Laos and Vietnam. The Japanese Football Association was said to be keen on the idea of splitting the AFC, but there was resistance from the Middle Eastern countries.

The mandatory inter-confederation playoff for the best-performing OFC team was abolished starting with the 2026 World Cup, following the tournament's expansion from 32 teams to 48. Beginning with the qualification for the 2026 tournament, the best performing OFC team is granted an automatic World Cup berth, with the second best being given an inter-confederation playoff spot.

== Presidents ==
=== Current leaders ===
Name	Position
(Vanuatu) Lambert Maltock	President
(French Polynesia) Thierry Ariiotima	Vice President
(Papua New Guinea) John Kapi Natto	Vice President
(Tonga) Lord Ve'ehala	Vice President
(New Caledonia) Franck Castillo	General Secretary

== Member nations ==
=== Current members ===
OFC is made up of 11 full member associations and 2 associate members. Those two are associate members of the OFC, but are not FIFA members.

Code	Association	National teams	Founded	Membership	FIFA affiliation	OFC affiliation	IOC member	Note
ASA	American Samoa	(M, W)	1984	Full	1998	1998	Yes	(Note: Unorganised unincorporated territory of the United States.)
COK	Cook Islands	(M, W)	1971	Full	1994	1994	Yes	(Note: State in free association with New Zealand.)
FIJ	Fiji	(M, W)	1938	Full	1964	1966	Yes	
KIR	Kiribati	(M, W)	1980	Associate	—N/a	2007	Yes	
NCL	New Caledonia	(M, W)	1928	Full	2004	1999	No	(Note: Sui generis collectivity of France.)
NZL	New Zealand	(M, W)	1891	Full	1948	1966	Yes	
PNG	Papua New Guinea	(M, W)	1962	Full	1966	1966	Yes	
SAM	Samoa	(M, W)	1968	Full	1986	1986	Yes	
SOL	Solomon Islands	(M, W)	1979	Full	1988	1988	Yes	
TAH	Tahiti	(M, W)	1989	Full	1990	1990	No	(Note: Overseas country of France.)
TGA	Tonga	(M, W)	1965	Full	1994	1994	Yes	
TUV	Tuvalu	(M, W)	1979	Associate	—N/a	2006	Yes	
VAN	Vanuatu	(M, W)	1934	Full	1988	1988	Yes	

=== Potential future members ===
==== Controversies ====
By October 2026, the OFC had not accepted any new full members in over twenty years, despite multiple applications from associations including the Marshall Islands, Tuvalu, and Kiribati. Over this time, the confederation significantly decreased its membership with the Federated States of Micronesia, Niue, and Palau being removed as associate members and the Northern Mariana Islands opting to join the Asian Football Confederation. When the Marshall Islands had applied in 2025, they were rejected and applied for the more "welcoming" AFC. Initially, the confederation did not even respond to the Marshall Islands' application directly, instead transmitting a message through a journalist from New Zealand. The response insinuated that the confederation did not want to or could not share its funding with any additional members, despite the Marshall Islands' strong application. In a 2025 interview, representatives from Tuvalu and Kiribati also stated that they felt the OFC is more interested in finding ways to keep new members out of the confederation rather than working on ways to include them.

==== United Nations member states ====
- Federated States of Micronesia: The Federated States of Micronesia were announced as new associate members of the OFC following the 2006 Extraordinary Congress. It is unclear when they were removed from the association. In 2010 the Federated States of Micronesia Football Association submitted an application to the East Asian Football Federation in hopes of taking the steps to join FIFA. However, the application was not successful. In 2017 Englishman Paul Watson who was connected to the association said, "I think it's starting to look like Micronesia is best off looking to Oceania rather than Asia. I don't see any reason why they shouldn't get into OFC within the next year or two, but it'll all depend on the people inside the organisation." The FSMFA reformed in 2023 and identified gaining membership in the AFC or OFC and FIFA as a main priority. In a July 2023 interview with the Daily Mirror, association President Brian Southwick stated that the goal was to join the OFC because of the level of competition and proximity to other members.
- Marshall Islands: The Marshall Islands Soccer Federation was created in 2020. The organisation's goal is to join the regional and world governing bodies "in the coming years." The Marshall Islands national soccer team played their first football matches at the 2025 Outrigger Challenge Cup. In October 2026, the MISF announced that it was in advanced discussions to join the Asian Football Confederation after being rejected by the OFC.
- Nauru: Nauru is one of the few fully-sovereign nations that is not a member of FIFA or a regional confederation. The Nauru Soccer Federation has reportedly applied for membership in both the OFC and FIFA but was denied. In 2009 the Nauruan Minister of Sport Rayong Itsimaera indicated that there were challenges preventing them from joining both bodies, presumably the lack of a league system and a preference for Australian rules football by the population. Nauru has been participating in some OFC initiatives since at least 2020. In 2023 the federation was relaunched under the auspices of the Nauru Olympic Committee with the stated purpose of fielding a national team and joining the OFC and FIFA. The Nauru Soccer Federation have now started to focus on youth development and identifying diaspora instead of creating a senior national team or league.
- Palau: The Palau Football Association has been a member of the OFC in the past, being announced as a new member at the organisation's 2006 Extraordinary Congress, alongside the Federated States of Micronesia. In 2009 the association asked to join the East Asian Football Federation, a sub-regional body under the Asian Football Confederation.

==== Semi-sovereign states ====
- Bougainville: The Autonomous Region of Bougainville is set to gain full independence from Papua New Guinea by 2027. The president of the Bougainville Football Federation, Justin Helele, expressed the association's desire to join FIFA and, presumably, the OFC. FIFA has already begun funding projects in the territory. The Melanesian region has also participated in OFC projects and has received funding from the confederation since at least 2012. That year the OFC began youth football programmes. The next year, the OFC helped fund the creation of a football academy in Bougainville.
- Niue: Niue is a former associate member of the OFC. Following the Niue Island Soccer Association's removal from the OFC and its subsequent disbandment in 2021, an OFC official indicated that they were aware of the formation of the new Niue Football Association and encourages its application for associate membership.
- Wallis and Futuna: The Wallis and Futuna national football team has played twenty-four international matches, all at the South Pacific Games between 1966 and 1995, and holds an overall record of five wins and nineteen defeats. The last time Wallis and Futuna played a game was at the 1995 South Pacific Games, where the team was eliminated in the group stage, having lost all 4 games it played. Since then it has been inactive, with no active football association governing body.

Other semi-autonomous territories in Oceania have teams with no affiliations to confederations, and play infrequently or are inactive. Others have never had an organised a national team.

- Christmas Island (external territory of Australia)
- Cocos (Keeling) Islands (external territory of Australia)
- Norfolk Island (external territory of Australia)
- Pitcairn Islands (overseas territory of the United Kingdom)
- Tokelau (dependent territory of New Zealand)

France's eastern Pacific territory of Clipperton Island does not currently have a human population or any infrastructure. The Galápagos Islands in the eastern Pacific are designated as a special province of Ecuador, and have a small human population, however, they are not represented in Ecuador's national leagues. FIFA has nevertheless documented a local neighborhood football scene on some of the islands. Among these islands, there is a provincial championship whose winner travels 1,000 kilometers to mainland Ecuador to represent Galápagos in the amateur national neighbourhood league competition. The sport is not known to be played on the U.S. outlying islands in the central Pacific, such as Midway Island and Wake Island, which have primarily served as military bases throughout their history. It has occasionally been played on some of Alaska's Aleutian Islands in the far north Pacific, but there has never been an outdoor league, due to the cold weather.

=== Former members ===
Association	Membership	Year
Australia	Full	1966–1972, 1978–2006
Chinese Taipei	Full	1976–1978, 1982–1989
Federated States of Micronesia	Associate	2006–?
Niue	Associate	1983–2021
Northern Mariana Islands	Associate	1983–2009
Palau	Associate	2006–2023

==== Note ====
- Israel had its men's national team enter the OFC qualifying tournaments for the FIFA World Cup in 1986 and 1990 due to political reasons, though it was never an OFC member.

=== Non-members ===
==== AFC Members ====
Three associations are geographically in Oceania but not affiliated with the OFC but are instead members of the Asian Football Confederation:

- Australia
- Guam
- Northern Mariana Islands

Most of the island states off the Pacific coast of Asia (including Indonesia, Japan, and the Philippines) had already joined the AFC prior to the formation of the OFC. The island state of Chinese Taipei (also known as Taiwan) was in the OFC throughout the 1970s and 1980s, as a result of Chinese political tensions. It had been affiliated with the AFC prior to the OFC move, and eventually rejoined it.

== Competitions ==
=== National teams ===
Men's

- OFC Men's Nations Cup
- OFC Men's Olympic Qualifying Tournament
- OFC U-19 Men's Championship
- OFC U-16 Men's Championship
- OFC Futsal Championship
- OFC Youth Futsal Tournament
- OFC Beach Soccer Championship

Women's

- OFC Women's Nations Cup
- OFC Women's Olympic Qualifying Tournament
- OFC U-20 Women's Championship
- OFC U-17 Women's Championship
- OFC Women's Futsal Cup

=== Clubs ===
Men's

- OFC Champions League
- OFC Professional League
- OFC Futsal Champions League

Women's

- OFC Women's Champions League

=== Former tournaments ===
Clubs

- Oceania Cup Winners' Cup
- OFC President's Cup

=== Current title holders ===
Competition	Year	Champions	Title	Runners-up	Next edition
Men's national teams
Nations Cup	2024 (final)	New Zealand	6th	Vanuatu	2028 (final)
Pacific Games	2023	New Caledonia	1st	Solomon Islands	2027
OFC Men's Olympic Qualifying Tournament	2023	New Zealand	5th	Fiji	2027
U-19/U-20 Championship	2024	New Zealand	9th	New Caledonia	2026 1-14 September
U-18 Youth Development Tournament	2019	India	1st	Tahiti	TBD
U-16/U-17 Championship	2026	New Zealand	12th	Fiji	TBD
U-15 Youth Development Tournament	2025	Solomon Islands	1st	Cook Islands	2026 1-9 October
Futsal Nations Cup	2025	Solomon Islands	6th	New Zealand	
Youth Futsal Tournament	2017	Solomon Islands	1st	New Zealand	TBD
Beach Soccer Nations Cup	2024	Tahiti	4th	Solomon Islands	2026 22-31 October
Women's national teams
Women's Nations Cup	2025 (final)	Solomon Islands	1st	Papua New Guinea	
Women's Olympic Tournament	2024	New Zealand	5th	Solomon Islands	
Pacific Games	2023	Papua New Guinea	6th	Fiji	2027
U-19/U20 Women's Championship	2025	New Zealand	9th	New Caledonia	
U-16/U17 Women's Championship	2025	New Zealand	7th	Samoa	2026 6-19 September
U-15 Women's Youth Development Tournament	2026	New Zealand	1st	Samoa	2028
Futsal Women's Nations Cup	2024	New Zealand	1st	Fiji	TBD
Men's club teams
Champions League	2025 (final)	(New Zealand) Auckland City	13th	(Papua New Guinea) Hekari United	2026 (final) 9-22 August
Professional League	2026	(New Zealand) Auckland FC	1st	(Australia) South Melbourne FC	2027
Futsal Champions League	2025 (final)	(Solomon Islands) Mataks FC	1st	(New Zealand) Waikato Rapids	2026 (final)
Women's club teams
Women's Champions League	2025 (final)	(New Zealand) Auckland United	2nd	(Papua New Guinea) Hekari United	2026 (final) 27 June - 10 July

== FIFA World Rankings ==
=== Overview ===
FIFA Men's Rankings (as of 7 October 2026)
OFC*	FIFA	+/-	National Team	Points
1	88	▼2	New Zealand	1277.02
2	152	▲1	Solomon Islands	1035.95
3	154	▲1	Fiji	1033.44
4	156	▼5	New Caledonia	1026.01
5	157	Steady	Tahiti	1016.32
6	161	▼1	Vanuatu	1005.9
7	167	▲1	Papua New Guinea	969.14
8	187	▼1	Cook Islands	880.25
9	189	▼1	Samoa	876.41
10	191	Steady	American Samoa	871.61
11	199	▲1	Tonga	835.64
*Local rankings based on FIFA ranking points

FIFA Women's Rankings (as of 20 October 2026)
OFC*	FIFA	+/-	National Team	Points
1	33	▼1	New Zealand	1645.41
2	55	▲3	Papua New Guinea	1455.55
3	85	▼5	Fiji	1260.87
4	87	Steady	Samoa	1246.84
5	88	▲1	Solomon Islands	1241.67
6	100	▲8	Vanuatu	1191.12
7	108	▼4	New Caledonia	1169.8
8	116	▼1	Tonga	1152.53
9	123	▼2	American Samoa	1130.42
10	124	▼1	Tahiti	1127.92
11	132	▼1	Cook Islands	1099.76
*Local rankings based on FIFA ranking points

=== Historical leaders ===
Men's

Women's

==== Team of the Year ====
Team ranking in the top four - Men's
Year	First	Second	Third	Fourth
2025	New Zealand	New Caledonia	Solomon Islands	Fiji
2024	New Zealand	Solomon Islands	Fiji	New Caledonia
2023	New Zealand	Solomon Islands	New Caledonia	Tahiti
2022	New Zealand	Solomon Islands	Papua New Guinea	New Caledonia
2021	New Zealand	Solomon Islands	New Caledonia	Tahiti
2020	New Zealand	Solomon Islands	New Caledonia	Tahiti
2019	New Zealand	Solomon Islands	New Caledonia	Tahiti
2018	New Zealand	Solomon Islands	New Caledonia	Tahiti
2017	New Zealand	Solomon Islands	Tahiti	New Caledonia
2016	New Zealand	Tahiti	New Caledonia	Papua New Guinea
2015	New Zealand	American Samoa	Cook Islands	Samoa
2014	New Zealand	New Caledonia	Tahiti	Solomon Islands
2013	New Zealand	New Caledonia	Tahiti	Solomon Islands
2012	New Zealand	New Caledonia	Tahiti	Solomon Islands
2011	New Zealand	Samoa	Fiji	New Caledonia
2010	New Zealand	Fiji	New Caledonia	Vanuatu
2009	New Zealand	Fiji	New Caledonia	Vanuatu
2008	New Zealand	Fiji	New Caledonia	Vanuatu
2007	New Zealand	New Caledonia	Solomon Islands	Fiji
2006	Australia	New Zealand	Fiji	Solomon Islands
2005	Australia	New Zealand	Fiji	Solomon Islands
2004	Australia	New Zealand	Tahiti	Solomon Islands
2003	Australia	New Zealand	Tahiti	Fiji
2002	New Zealand	Australia	Tahiti	Fiji
2001	Australia	New Zealand	Fiji	Tahiti
2000	Australia	New Zealand	Solomon Islands	Tahiti
1999	Australia	New Zealand	Fiji	Tahiti
1998	Australia	New Zealand	Tahiti	Fiji
1997	Australia	New Zealand	Solomon Islands	Fiji
1996	Australia	New Zealand	Fiji	Tahiti
1995	Australia	New Zealand	Fiji	Tahiti
1994	Australia	New Zealand	Fiji	Tahiti
1993	Australia	New Zealand	Fiji	Tahiti

Team ranking in the top four - Women's
Year	First	Second	Third	Fourth
2025	New Zealand	Papua New Guinea	Solomon Islands	Fiji
2024	New Zealand	Papua New Guinea	Fiji	Solomon Islands
2023	New Zealand	Papua New Guinea	Fiji	Tonga
2022	New Zealand	Papua New Guinea	Fiji	Tonga
2021	New Zealand	Papua New Guinea	Fiji	Tonga
2020	New Zealand	Papua New Guinea	Fiji	Tonga
2019	New Zealand	Papua New Guinea	Fiji	Tonga
2018	New Zealand	Papua New Guinea	Fiji	Tonga
2017	New Zealand	—N/a		
2016	New Zealand	Papua New Guinea	Fiji	Tonga
2015	New Zealand	Papua New Guinea	Fiji	Tonga
2014	New Zealand	Papua New Guinea	Tonga	Cook Islands
2013	New Zealand	—N/a		
2012	New Zealand	Papua New Guinea	Tonga	Fiji
2011	New Zealand	Papua New Guinea	Tonga	Fiji
2010	New Zealand	Papua New Guinea	Tonga	Fiji
2009	New Zealand	—N/a		
2008	New Zealand	Papua New Guinea	Tonga	Fiji
2007	New Zealand	Papua New Guinea	Tonga	Fiji
2006	Australia	New Zealand	Tonga	Papua New Guinea
2005	Australia	New Zealand	Tonga	Papua New Guinea
2004	Australia	New Zealand	Tonga	Papua New Guinea
2003	Australia	New Zealand	Tonga	Papua New Guinea

== Major tournament records ==
Legend

- 1st – Champion
- 2nd – Runner-up
- 3rd – Third place
- 4th – Fourth place
- QF – Quarter-finals (1934–1938, 1954–1970, and 1986–present: knockout round of 8)
- R3 – Round 3 (2026–present: knockout round of 16)
- R2 – Round 2 (1974–1978: second group stage, top 8; 1982: second group stage, top 12; 1986–2022: knockout round of 16; 2026–present: knockout round of 32)
- R1 – Round 1 (1930, 1950–1970 and 1986–present: group stage; 1934–1938: knockout round of 16; 1974–1982: first group stage)
- •• — Qualified but withdrew
- • — Did not qualify
- × — Did not enter / withdrawn / banned / disqualified
- — Hosts

For each tournament, the flag of the host country and the number of teams in each finals tournament (in brackets) are shown.

=== FIFA World Cup ===
Oceania has sent representatives to the FIFA World Cup five times: Australia in 1974 and 2006, and New Zealand in 1982, 2010, and 2026. Of these, only Australia in 2006 progressed beyond the first round.

The OFC was previously the only FIFA confederation that did not have a guaranteed spot in the World Cup finals. Between 1966 and 1982, OFC teams joined the Asian zone qualification tournament, while from 1986 onwards, the winners of the Oceanian zone qualification tournament had to enter the intercontinental play-offs against teams from other confederations in order to gain a spot in the FIFA World Cup.

Beginning in 2026, the OFC had a guaranteed spot in the FIFA World Cup for the first time in history, as a result of the competition's expansion from 32 to 48 teams.

FIFA World Cup record
Team	1930 (Uruguay) (13)	1934 (Italy) (16)	1938 (France) (15)	1950 (Brazil) (13)	1954 (Switzerland) (16)	1958 (Sweden) (16)	1962 (Chile) (16)	1966 (England) (16)	1970 (Mexico) (16)	1974 (West Germany) (16)	1978 (Argentina) (16)	1982 (Spain) (24)	1986 (Mexico) (24)	1990 (Italy) (24)	1994 (United States) (24)	1998 (France) (32)	2002 (Japan) (South Korea) (32)	2006 (Germany) (32)	2010 (South Africa) (32)	2014 (Brazil) (32)	2018 (Russia) (32)	2022 (Qatar) (32)	2026 (Canada) (Mexico) (United States) (48)	Years	inclusive WC Qual.
OFC qualifier	–							1966	1970	1974	1978	1982	1986	1990	1994	1998	2002	2006	2010	2014	2018	2022	2026		
Australia								•	•	R1	•	•	•	•	•	•	•	R2	Part of AFC					2	11
New Zealand				×	×	×	×	×	•	•	•	R1	•	•	•	•	•	•	R1	•	•	•	R1	3	14
Total (2 teams)	0	0	0	0	0	0	0	0	0	1	0	1	0	0	0	0	0	1	1	0	0	0	1	5	–

FIFA World Cup record
Year	Qualifier	Round	Position	Pld	W	D*	L	GF	GA	Format
1930 (Uruguay) (13)	No teams from Oceania entered									
1934 (Italy) (16)	No teams from Oceania entered									
1938 (France) (15)	No teams from Oceania entered									
1950 (Brazil) (13)	No teams from Oceania entered									
1954 (Switzerland) (16)	No teams from Oceania entered									
1958 (Sweden) (16)	No teams from Oceania entered									
1962 (Chile) (16)	No teams from Oceania entered									
1966 (England) (16)	No OFC team qualified									Entered in Africa and Asia
1970 (Mexico) (16)	No OFC team qualified									Entered in Asia
1974 (West Germany) (16)	Australia	Group stage	14th	3	0	1	2	0	5	Entered in Asia
1978 (Argentina) (16)	No OFC team qualified									Entered in Asia
1982 (Spain) (24)	New Zealand	Group stage	23rd	3	0	0	3	2	12	Entered in Asia
1986 (Mexico) (24)	No OFC team qualified									Round-robin; Play-off
1990 (Italy) (24)	No OFC team qualified									First round Second round Play-off
1994 (United States) (24)	No OFC team qualified									First round Second round 1st play-off 2nd play-off
1998 (France) (32)	No OFC team qualified									First round Second round Third round Play-off
2002 (Japan) (South Korea) (32)	No OFC team qualified									First round Second round Play-off
2006 (Germany) (32)	Australia	Round of 16	16th	4	1	1	2	5	6	First round Second round Third round Play-off
2010 (South Africa) (32)	New Zealand	Group stage	22nd	3	0	3	0	2	2	First round Second round Play-off
2014 (Brazil) (32)	No OFC team qualified									First round Second round Third round Play-off
2018 (Russia) (32)	No OFC team qualified									First round Second round Third round Play-off
2022 (Qatar) (32)	No OFC team qualified									2022 FIFA World Cup qualification (OFC); Play-off
2026 (Canada) (Mexico) (United States) (48)	New Zealand	Group stage	40th	3	0	1	2	4	10	2026 FIFA World Cup qualification (OFC); Play-off
Total (2 teams)	5/23	Round of 16	14th	16	1	6	9	13	35	

==== OFC play-off record ====
1966 FIFA World Cup qualification (Africa, Asia and Oceania)

Team 1	Agg.	Team 2	1st leg	2nd leg
North Korea	9–2	Australia	6–1	3–1

1970 FIFA World Cup qualification (AFC and OFC)

Team 1	Agg.	Team 2	1st leg	2nd leg
Israel	2–1	Australia	1–0	1–1

1974 FIFA World Cup qualification (AFC and OFC)

Team 1	Agg.	Team 2	1st leg	2nd leg	Playoff
Australia	(t) 3–2	South Korea	0–0	2–2	1–0

1982 FIFA World Cup qualification (AFC and OFC)

Team 1	Score	Team 2
New Zealand	2–1	China

1986 UEFA–OFC play-off

Team 1	Agg.	Team 2	1st leg	2nd leg
Scotland	2–0	Australia	2–0	0–0

1990 CONMEBOL–OFC play-off

Team 1	Agg.	Team 2	1st leg	2nd leg
Colombia	1–0	Israel	1–0	0–0

Israel played in the OFC zone for political reasons.

1994 CONCACAF–OFC play-off

Team 1	Agg.	Team 2	1st leg	2nd leg
Canada	3–3 (p)	Australia	2–1	1–2

1994 CONMEBOL–OFC play-off

Team 1	Agg.	Team 2	1st leg	2nd leg
Australia	1–2	Argentina	1–1	0–1

1998 AFC–OFC play-off

Team 1	Agg.	Team 2	1st leg	2nd leg
Iran	(a) 3–3	Australia	1–1	2–2

2002 CONMEBOL–OFC play-off

Team 1	Agg.	Team 2	1st leg	2nd leg
Australia	1–3	Uruguay	1–0	0–3

2006 CONMEBOL–OFC play-off

Team 1	Agg.	Team 2	1st leg	2nd leg
Uruguay	1–1 (p)	Australia	1–0	0–1

2010 AFC–OFC play-off

Team 1	Agg.	Team 2	1st leg	2nd leg
Bahrain	0–1	New Zealand	0–0	0–1

2014 CONCACAF–OFC play-off

Team 1	Agg.	Team 2	1st leg	2nd leg
Mexico	9–3	New Zealand	5–1	4–2

2018 CONMEBOL–OFC play-off

Team 1	Agg.	Team 2	1st leg	2nd leg
New Zealand	0–2	Peru	0–0	0–2

2022 CONCACAF–OFC play-off

Team 1	Score	Team 2
Costa Rica	1–0	New Zealand

2026 CONCACAF–OFC play-off

Team 1	Score	Team 2
New Caledonia	0–1	Jamaica

=== FIFA Women's World Cup ===
FIFA Women's World Cup record
Team	1991 (China) (12)	1995 (Sweden) (12)	1999 (United States) (16)	2003 (United States) (16)	2007 (China) (16)	2011 (Germany) (16)	2015 (Canada) (24)	2019 (France) (24)	2023 (Australia) (New Zealand) (32)	2027 (Brazil) (32)	Years	inclusive W. WC Qual.
Australia	•	R1	R1	R1	Part of AFC						3	4
New Zealand	R1	•	•	•	R1	R1	R1	R1	R1	Q	7	9
Total (2 teams)	1	1	1	1	1	1	1	1	1	1	10	13

=== Olympic Games ===
==== Men's tournament ====
Olympic Games (Men's tournament) record
Team Total (3 teams)	1900 (France) (3)	1904 (United States) (3)	1908 (United Kingdom) (6)	1912 (Sweden) (11)	1920 (Belgium) (14)	1924 (France) (22)	1928 (Netherlands) (17)	1936 (Germany) (16)	1948 (United Kingdom) (18)	1952 (Finland) (25)	1956 (Australia) (11)	1960 (Italy) (16)	1964 (Japan) (14)	1968 (Mexico) (16)	1972 (West Germany) (16)	1976 (Canada) (13)	1980 (Soviet Union) (16)	1984 (United States) (16)	1988 (South Korea) (16)	1992 (Spain) (16)	1996 (United States) (16)	2000 (Australia) (16)	2004 (Greece) (16)	2008 (China) (16)	2012 (United Kingdom) (16)	2016 (Brazil) (16)	2020 (Japan) (16)	2024 (France) (16)	Years
Australia	×	×	×	×	×	×	×	×	×	×	QF	×	×	×	×	×	×	×	QF	4th	GS	GS	QF	Part of AFC					6
Fiji	×	×	×	×	×	×	×	×	×	×	×	×	×	×	×	×	×	×	×	•	•	•	•	•	•	GS	•	•	1
New Zealand	×	×	×	×	×	×	×	×	×	×	×	×	×	×	×	×	×	•	•	•	•	•	•	GS	GS	•	QF	GS	4

==== Women's tournament ====
Olympic Games (Women's tournament) record
Team Total (2 teams)	1996 (United States) (8)	2000 (Australia) (8)	2004 (Greece) (10)	2008 (China) (12)	2012 (United Kingdom) (12)	2016 (Brazil) (12)	2020 (Japan) (12)	2024 (France) (12)	Years
Australia	•	GS	QF	Part of AFC					2
New Zealand	•	•	•	GS	QF	GS	GS	GS	5

=== OFC Men's Nations Cup ===
OFC Men's Nations Cup record
Team (Total 15 teams)	1973 (New Zealand) (5)	1980 (New Caledonia) (8)	1996 (Pacific Community) (4)	1998 (Australia) (6)	2000 (French Polynesia) (6)	2002 (New Zealand) (8)	2004 (Australia) (6)	2008 (Pacific Community) (4)	2012 (Solomon Islands) (8)	2016 (Papua New Guinea) (8)	2024 (Vanuatu) (Fiji) (8)	Years
New Zealand	1st	GS	SF	1st	2nd	1st	3rd	1st	3rd	1st	1st	11
Tahiti	2nd	2nd	2nd	4th	GS	3rd	5th	•	1st	GS	3rd	10
Vanuatu (Note: Includes results as New Hebrides.)	4th	GS	•	GS	4th	4th	6th	4th	GS	GS	2nd	10
Fiji	5th	4th	•	3rd	••	GS	4th	3rd	GS	GS	4th	9
Solomon Islands	×	GS	SF	•	3rd	GS	2nd	•	4th	SF	GS	8
Australia	×	1st	1st	2nd	1st	2nd	1st	Part of AFC				6
New Caledonia	3rd	3rd	•	•	•	GS	•	2nd	2nd	SF	×	6
Papua New Guinea	×	GS	•	•	•	GS	•	×	GS	2nd	GS	5
Samoa (Note: Includes results as Western Samoa.)	×	×	•	•	•	•	•	•	GS	GS	GS	3
Cook Islands	×	×	×	GS	GS	×	•	•	•	•	•	2
American Samoa	×	×	•	•	•	•	•	•	•	•	×	0
Tonga	×	×	•	•	•	•	•	•	•	•	•	0
Tuvalu	×	×	×	×	×	×	×	•	×	×	×	0
Kiribati	×	×	×	×	×	×	×	×	×	×	×	0
Niue	×	×	×	×	×	×	×	×	×	×	×	0

=== OFC Women's Nations Cup ===
OFC Women's Nations Cup record
Team (Total 15 teams)	1983 (New Caledonia) (4)	1986 (New Zealand) (4)	1989 (Australia) (5)	1991 (Australia) (3)	1994 (Papua New Guinea) (3)	1998 (New Zealand) (6)	2003 (Australia) (5)	2007 (Papua New Guinea) (4)	2010 (New Zealand) (8)	2014 (Papua New Guinea) (4)	2018 (New Caledonia) (8)	2022 (Fiji) (9)	2025 (Fiji) (8)	Years
New Zealand	1st	3rd	2nd	1st	2nd	2nd	2nd	1st	1st	1st	1st	×	—	11
Papua New Guinea	—	×	5th	3rd	3rd	3rd	3rd	2nd	2nd	2nd	3rd	1st	2nd	11
Australia (Note: Former OFC member, but now a member of the Asian Football Confederation.)	2nd	2nd	3rd (Note: The third place play-off scheduled to take place between Australia and Australia B was cancelled due to waterlogged pitch, so their group standings are used.)	2nd	1st	1st	1st	Part of AFC						7
Cook Islands	—	—	—	—	—	—	5th	×	3rd	3rd	GS	QF	8th	6
Fiji	4th	—	—	—	—	4th	×	×	GS	—	2nd	2nd	4th	6
Tonga	—	—	—	—	—	—	×	3rd	GS	4th	GS	QF	7th	6
Samoa	—	—	—	—	—	GS	4th	×	—	—	GS	4th	3rd	5
Solomon Islands	—	—	—	—	—	—	—	4th	4th	—	•	3rd	1st	4
Tahiti	—	—	—	—	—	—	×	×	GS	—	GS	QF	6th	4
New Caledonia	3rd (Note: New Caledonia participated and hosted the tournament in 1983, but were not a member of the OFC or FIFA until 2004.)	—	—	—	—	—	—	×	—	—	4th	QF	—	3
Vanuatu	—	—	—	—	—	—	×	×	GS	—	•	GS	5th	3
Chinese Taipei	—	1st	1st	Part of AFC										2
American Samoa	—	—	—	—	—	GS	×	—	—	—	•	×	—	1
Australia B (Note: Secondary national team.)	—	—	4th	—	—	—	—	Part of AFC						1
New Zealand B	—	4th	—	—	—	—	—	—	—	—	—	—	—	1

=== FIFA U-20 World Cup ===
FIFA U-20 World Cup record
Team	1977 (Tunisia) (16)	1979 (Japan) (16)	1981 (Australia) (16)	1983 (Mexico) (16)	1985 (Soviet Union) (16)	1987 (Chile) (16)	1989 (Saudi Arabia) (16)	1991 (Portugal) (16)	1993 (Australia) (16)	1995 (Qatar) (16)	1997 (Malaysia) (24)	1999 (Nigeria) (24)	2001 (Argentina) (24)	2003 (United Arab Emirates) (24)	2005 (Netherlands) (24)	2007 (Canada) (24)	2009 (Egypt) (24)	2011 (Colombia) (24)	2013 (Turkey) (24)	2015 (New Zealand) (24)	2017 (South Korea) (24)	2019 (Poland) (24)	2023 (Argentina) (24)	2025 (Chile) (24)	Years
Australia (Note: Australia represented OFC before 2006.)		•	QF	R1	R1	R1	•	4th	4th	QF	R2	R1	R2	R2	R1	Part of AFC									12
Fiji		•	•	•	•	•	•	•	•	•	•	•	•	•	•	•	•	•	•	R1	•	•	R1	•	2
New Caledonia		•	•	•	•	•	•	•	•	•	•	•	•	•	•	•	•	•	•	•	•	•	•	R1	1
New Zealand		•	•	•	•	•	•	•	•	•	•	•	•	•	•	R1	•	R1	R1	R2	R2	R2	R2	R1	8
Tahiti			•	•	•	•	•	•	•	•	•	•	•	•	•	•	R1	•	•	•	•	R1	•	•	2
Vanuatu		•	•	•	•	•	•	•	•	•	•	•	•	•	•	•	•	•	•	•	R1	•	•	•	1
Total (6 teams)	0	0	1	1	1	1	0	1	1	1	1	1	1	1	1	1	1	1	1	2	2	2	2	2	26

=== FIFA U-20 Women's World Cup ===
FIFA U-20 Women's World Cup record
Team	2002 (Canada) (12)	2004 (Thailand) (12)	2006 (Russia) (16)	2008 (Chile) (16)	2010 (Germany) (16)	2012 (Japan) (16)	2014 (Canada) (16)	2016 (Papua New Guinea) (16)	2018 (France) (16)	2022 (Costa Rica) (16)	2024 (Colombia) (24)	2026 (Poland) (24)	Years
Australia	QF	QF	R1	Part of AFC									3
Fiji	•	•	•	•	•	•	•	•	•	•	R1	•	1
New Caledonia	•	•	•	•	•	•	•	•	•	•	•	R1	1
New Zealand	•	•	R1	R1	R1	R1	QF	R1	R1	R1	R1	R1	9
Papua New Guinea	•	•	•	•	•	•	•	R1	•	•	•	•	1
Total (5 teams)	1	1	2	1	1	1	1	2	1	1	2	2	16

=== FIFA U-17 World Cup ===
FIFA U-17 World Cup record
Team	1985 (China) (16)	1987 (Canada) (16)	1989 (Scotland) (16)	1991 (Italy) (16)	1993 (Japan) (16)	1995 (Ecuador) (16)	1997 (Egypt) (16)	1999 (New Zealand) (16)	2001 (Trinidad and Tobago) (16)	2003 (Finland) (16)	2005 (Peru) (16)	2007 (South Korea) (24)	2009 (Nigeria) (24)	2011 (Mexico) (24)	2013 (United Arab Emirates) (24)	2015 (Chile) (24)	2017 (India) (24)	2019 (Brazil) (24)	2023 (Indonesia) (24)	2025 (Qatar) (48)	2026 (Qatar) (48)	Years
Australia	QF	QF	R1	QF	QF	QF	•	2nd	QF	R1	R1	Part of AFC										10
Fiji	•	•	•	•	•	•	•	•	•	•	•	•	×	•	•	•	•	•	•	R1	Q	2
New Caledonia	•	•	•	•	•	•	•	•	•	•	•	•	•	•	•	•	R1	•	R1	R1	Q	4
New Zealand	•	•	•	•	•	•	R1	R1	•	•	•	R1	R2	R2	R1	R2	R1	R1	R1	R1	Q	12
Solomon Islands	•	•	•	•	•	•	•	•	•	•	•	•	•	•	•	•	•	R1	•	•	•	1
Total (5 teams)	1	1	1	1	1	1	1	2	1	1	1	1	1	1	1	1	2	2	2	3	3	29

=== FIFA U-17 Women's World Cup ===
FIFA U-17 Women's World Cup record
Team	2008 (New Zealand) (16)	2010 (Trinidad and Tobago) (16)	2012 (Azerbaijan) (16)	2014 (Costa Rica) (16)	2016 (Jordan) (16)	2018 (Uruguay) (16)	2022 (India) (16)	2024 (Dominican Republic) (16)	2025 (Morocco) (24)	2026 (Morocco) (24)	Years
New Zealand	R1	R1	R1	R1	R1	3rd	R1	R1	R1	Q	10
Samoa	×	×	×	×	•	•	•	×	R1	Q	2
Total (2 teams)	1	1	1	1	1	1	1	1	2	2	12

=== FIFA Futsal World Cup ===
FIFA Futsal World Cup record
Team	1989 (Netherlands) (16)	1992 (Hong Kong) (16)	1996 (Spain) (16)	2000 (Guatemala) (16)	2004 (Taiwan) (16)	2008 (Brazil) (20)	2012 (Thailand) (24)	2016 (Colombia) (24)	2021 (Lithuania) (24)	2024 (Uzbekistan) (24)	Years
Australia	R1	R1	R1	R1	R1	Part of AFC					5
New Zealand										R1	1
Solomon Islands						R1	R1	R1	R1		4
Total (3 teams)	1	1	1	1	1	1	1	1	1	1	10

=== FIFA Beach Soccer World Cup ===
FIFA Beach Soccer World Cup record
Team	2005 (Brazil) (12)	2006 (Brazil) (16)	2007 (Brazil) (16)	2008 (France) (16)	2009 (United Arab Emirates) (16)	2011 (Italy) (16)	2013 (French Polynesia) (16)	2015 (Portugal) (16)	2017 (The Bahamas) (16)	2019 (Paraguay) (16)	2021 (Russia) (16)	2024 (United Arab Emirates) (16)	2025 (Seychelles) (16)	Years
Australia	R1	Part of AFC												1
Solomon Islands		R1	R1	R1	R1		R1							5
Tahiti						R1	4th	2nd	2nd	R1	QF	QF	R1	8
Total (3 teams)	1	1	1	1	1	1	2	1	1	1	1	1	1	13

Notes

1. In 2005, 2008, 2015 and 2017, no OFC qualifiers for the FIFA Beach Soccer World Cup were held and teams were selected to represent OFC (2005: Australia; 2008: Solomon Islands; 2015 and 2017: Tahiti).

=== Former tournaments ===
==== FIFA Confederations Cup ====
FIFA Confederations Cup record
Team	1992 (Saudi Arabia) (4)	1995 (Saudi Arabia) (6)	1997 (Saudi Arabia) (8)	1999 (Mexico) (8)	2001 (South Korea) (Japan) (8)	2003 (France) (8)	2005 (Germany) (8)	2009 (South Africa) (8)	2013 (Brazil) (8)	2017 (Russia) (8)	Years
Australia (Note: Australia was an OFC member until 2005, and played three times in the FIFA Confederations Cup as an OFC member (1997, 2001, 2005). They became an AFC member in 2006, and qualified in the 2017 FIFA Confederations Cup as an AFC member.)	×	×	2nd	•	3rd	•	GS	Part of AFC			3
New Zealand	×	×	•	GS	•	GS	•	GS	•	GS	4
Tahiti	×	×	•	•	•	•	•	•	GS	•	1
Total (3 teams)	0	0	1	1	1	1	1	1	1	1	8

== See also ==
- Oceania association football club records and statistics
- International Federation of Association Football (FIFA)
  - Asian Football Confederation (AFC)
  - Confederation of African Football (CAF)
  - Confederation of North, Central America and Caribbean Association Football (CONCACAF)
  - Confederation of South American Football (CONMEBOL)
  - Union of European Football Associations (UEFA)
- List of association football competitions
