= Abbas Ahmed Khamis =

Bahraini footballer

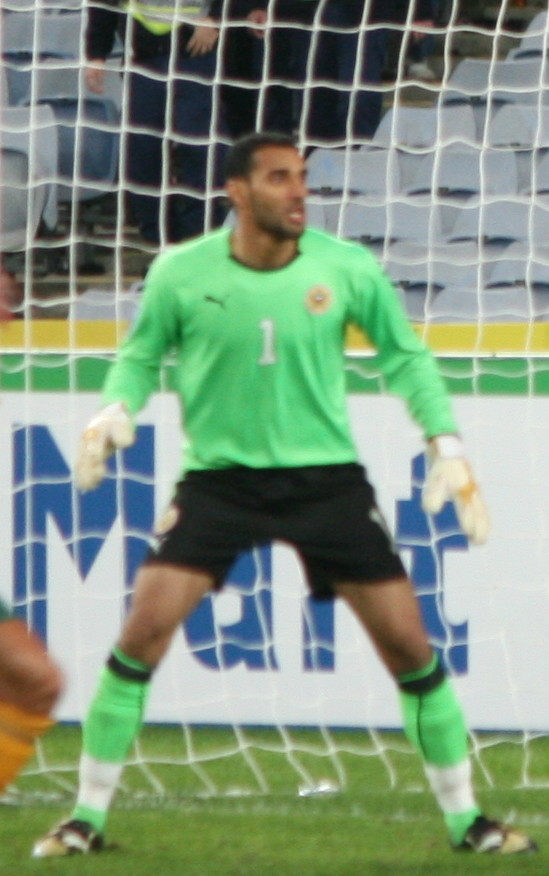
- Khamis playing in the 2010 FIFA World Cup qualification against Australia

Personal information
- Full name: Abbas Ahmed Khamis
- Date of birth: 13 June 1983 (age 43)
- Place of birth: Bahrain
- Height: 1.80 m (5 ft 11 in)
- Position: Goalkeeper

Team information
- Current team: Sitra

Senior career*
Years	Team	Apps	(Gls)
2004–2007	Sitra		
2007–2012	Al-Ahli		
2012–2022	Hidd SCC		
2022–	Sitra		

International career^{‡}
2007–2012	Bahrain	12	(0)
- * Club domestic league appearances and goals ‡ National team caps and goals as of October 2011

Abbas Ahmed Khamis (Arabic: عباس أحمد خميس; born 13 June 1983) is a footballer from Bahrain. He plays for Bahraini football club Sitra, and has played in the Bahrain national football team. He was part of the Bahrain team in AFC Asian Cup 2007 and 2011
