= Aaron Scott (footballer) =

New Zealand footballer (born 1986)

Personal information
- Full name: Aaron James Scott
- Date of birth: 18 July 1986 (age 40)
- Height: 1.78 m (5 ft 10 in)
- Position: Defender

Team information
- Current team: Melville United

Senior career*
| Years | Team | Apps | (Gls) |
| 2007–2008 | Waikato FC | 18 | (1) |
| 2008 – 2014 | Waitakere United | 37 | (1) |

International career^{‡}
| 2008– | New Zealand U-23 | 8 | (0) |
| 2009– | New Zealand | 8 | (0) |
- * Club domestic league appearances and goals as of 8 April 2010 ‡ National team caps and goals as of 26 March 2013

Aaron James Scott (born 18 July 1986) is a New Zealand footballer who plays for NZFC side Waitakere United and has represented New Zealand under 23 at the Olympics and played for the senior side, the All Whites.

== International career ==
He was included in the New Zealand squad for the football tournament at the Summer Olympics in Beijing where he played in all three of New Zealand's group matches against China (1-1), Brazil (0-5) and Belgium (0-1). Scott has been included in the New Zealand squad for the 2009 FIFA Confederations Cup in South Africa, along with fellow non-professionals James Bannatyne and Andrew Barron.

Scott made his full All Whites debut as a substitute in a 1–3 loss to Thailand on 28 March 2009.

=== International goals and caps ===
New Zealand's goal tally first.

International appearances and goals
| # | Date | Venue | Opponent | Result | Competition | Goal | Match Report |
|---|---|---|---|---|---|---|---|
2009
| 1 | 28 March | National Stadium, Bangkok | Thailand | 1–3 | International Match | | NZ Football |
| 2 | 6 June | Botswana National Stadium, Gaborone | Botswana | 0–0 | International Match | | NZ Football |
| 3 | 20 June | Ellis Park Stadium, Johannesburg | Iraq | 0–0 | 2009 FIFA Confederations Cup | | NZ Football |
| 4 | 10 September | King Abdullah Stadium, Amman | Jordan | 3–1 | International Match | | NZ Football |
2013
| 5 | 26 March | Lawson Tama Stadium, Honiara | Solomon Islands | 2–0 | 2014 FIFA World Cup Qualifier | | NZ Football |

=== International career statistics ===
New Zealand national team
| Year | Apps | Goals |
|---|---|---|
| 2009 | 4 | 0 |
| 2013 | 1 | 0 |
| Total | 5 | 0 |

== Club career statistics ==
All-time club performances
| Club | Season | NZFC | | Club World Cup | | Oceania | | Total |
| Club | Season | App | Goals | App | Goals | App | Goals | App | Goals |
|---|---|---|---|---|---|---|---|---|---|
| Waikato FC (New Zealand Football Championship) | 2007–08 | 18 | 1 | | | | | 18 | 1 |
| Waikato FC (New Zealand Football Championship) | Club Total | 18 | 1 | | | | | 18 | 1 |
| Club | Season | NZFC | | Club World Cup | | Oceania | | Total |
| Club | Season | App | Goals | App | Goals | App | Goals | App | Goals |
| Waitakere United (New Zealand Football Championship) | 2008–09 | 15 | 0 | | | | | 15 | 0 |
| Waitakere United (New Zealand Football Championship) | 2009–10 | 9 | 0 | | | 4 | 0 | 13 | 0 |
| Waitakere United (New Zealand Football Championship) | Club Total | 24 | 0 | | | 4 | 0 | 28 | 0 |
| Career totals | | 44 | 1 | | | 4 | 0 | 48 | 0 |
Last updated 8 April 2010
