= Koleta Likuculacula =

Fijian footballer (born 2000)

Personal information
- Full name: Koleta Maramanitavuto Likuculacula
- Date of birth: 17 August 2000 (age 26)
- Position: Forward

Team information
- Current team: Ba

Senior career*
Years	Team	Apps	(Gls)
2020	Ba		(64)

International career^{‡}
2019–	Fiji	5	(1)
- * Club domestic league appearances and goals ‡ National team caps and goals as of 18 July 2026

Koleta Maramanitavuto Likuculacula (born 17 August 2000) is a Fijian footballer who plays as a forward for Ba FC and the Fiji women's national team.

In August 2018 she was named to the Fijian team for the 2018 OFC Women's Nations Cup.

Likuculacula is from Delasui in Tailevu Province.

In December 2022 she completed an OFC C-licence coaching course and announced that she would move into coaching.

== International goals ==
Scores and results list Fiji's goal tally first.

No.	Date	Venue	Opponent	Score	Result	Competition
1.	7 February 2024	FFS Football Stadium, Apia, Samoa	American Samoa	4–0	10–0	2024 OFC Women's Olympic Qualifying Tournament
