= James Bannatyne =

New Zealand footballer (born 1975)

Personal information
- Date of birth: 30 June 1975 (age 51)
- Place of birth: Lower Hutt, New Zealand
- Height: 1.95 m (6 ft 5 in)
- Position: Goalkeeper

Senior career*
Years	Team	Apps	(Gls)
1988–1997	Petone FC		
1996–2001	Miramar Rangers		
2000–2001	Yeading	24	(1)
2001–2002	Football Kingz	4	(0)
2002	Miramar Rangers		
2002–2003	Football Kingz	4	(0)
2005–2006	Canterbury United		
2006–2010	Team Wellington	30	(1)

International career^{‡}
2001–2010	New Zealand	3	(0)
- * Club domestic league appearances and goals as of 23 December 2009 ‡ National team caps and goals as of 23 December 2009

James Bannatyne (born 30 June 1975) is a New Zealand former association football goalkeeper. He last played for Team Wellington in the New Zealand Football Championship. He represented New Zealand at international level, generally as backup to Glen Moss and Mark Paston.

He has also played for the Football Kingz in the now-defunct Australian National Soccer League.

Bannatyne made his full All Whites debut in a 2–0 win over Cook Islands on 18 June 2001. He was included in the New Zealand squad for the 2009 FIFA Confederations Cup in South Africa, along with fellow non-professionals Aaron Scott and Andrew Barron.

On 10 May 2010, Bannatyne was named in New Zealand's final 23-man squad to compete at the 2010 FIFA World Cup. He retired from international football after returning from the World Cup.

His brother, Stu Bannatyne, is a round-the-world sailor.

== See also ==
- New Zealand national football team
- New Zealand at the FIFA World Cup
- New Zealand national football team results
- List of New Zealand international footballers
