= Andrew Barron (footballer) =

New Zealand footballer (born 1980)

Personal information
- Full name: Andrew Barron
- Date of birth: 24 December 1980 (age 45)
- Place of birth: Invercargill, New Zealand
- Height: 1.78 m (5 ft 10 in)
- Position: Central midfielder

Youth career
- 1988–1997: Petone

College career
Years	Team	Apps	(Gls)
2000–2003	William Carey Crusaders		

Senior career*
Years	Team	Apps	(Gls)
1997–2000	Miramar Rangers		
2003–2004	New Orleans Shell Shockers	29	(8)
2004–2005	Lisburn Distillery	16	(1)
2005–2006	Canterbury United	15	(1)
2006–2007	Team Wellington	12	(4)
2008	Minnesota Thunder	11	(0)
2008–2010	Team Wellington	22	(8)
2013	Kiwi		

International career^{‡}
2006–2010	New Zealand	12	(1)
- * Club domestic league appearances and goals as of 10 April 2010 ‡ National team caps and goals as of 20 June 2010

Andrew Barron (born 24 December 1980) is a New Zealand former footballer who played as a central midfielder.

Barron, who combined full-time employment as an investment counselor and banker with semi-professional football, was also a New Zealand international who played at the 2010 FIFA World Cup, making him the first non-professional to participate in the tournament.

== Club career ==
Barron signed for Canterbury United, a New Zealand Football Championship (NZFC) franchise at the start of the 2005–06 season. After impressing making 15 appearances and scoring one goal, he was scouted by other NZFC club Team Wellington for the following season and scored four goals in 12 appearances in a playmaker role.

In 2008, Barron went in search of a professional career overseas and signed with the Minnesota Thunder of the USL First Division, however after struggling to make an impact, he returned to New Zealand to play for Team Wellington midway through the 2008–09 NZFC season. Barron made 34 appearances (all starts) and scored 12 goals in both stints with the Wellington club.

== International career ==
Barron made his debut for the New Zealand national team in the first match of a two-game friendly series against Malaysia on 19 February 2006. Barron scored his first international goal in the second match of the Malaysian series with an 88th-minute strike to seal a 2–1 win for the All Whites.

Barron was included in the New Zealand squad for the 2009 FIFA Confederations Cup in South Africa, along with fellow non-professionals James Bannatyne and Aaron Scott and was also part of the All Whites team which beat Bahrain in the 2010 FIFA World Cup qualification play-off match. During the 2010 FIFA World Cup, he made headlines when he featured as a late substitute against defending champions Italy and became the first non-professional to participate in the tournament.

International goals
#	Date	Opponent	Final Score	Result	Competition
1	23 February 2006	Malaysia	2–1	Win	Friendly
Last updated 7 April 2010

== Career statistics ==
All-Time Club Performances
Club	Season	Premiership		Irish Cup		League Cup		Europe		Total
Club	Season	App	Goals	App	Goals	App	Goals	App	Goals	App	Goals
Lisburn Distillery F.C. (IFA Premiership)	2004–05	16	1							16	1
Lisburn Distillery F.C. (IFA Premiership)	Club Total	16	1							16	1
Club	Season	NZFC		Chatham Cup		Club World Cup		Oceania		Total
Club	Season	App	Goals	App	Goals	App	Goals	App	Goals	App	Goals
Canterbury United (New Zealand Football Championship)	2005–06	15	1							15	1
Canterbury United (New Zealand Football Championship)	Club Total	15	1							15	1
Club	Season	NZFC		Chatham Cup		Club World Cup		Oceania		Total
Club	Season	App	Goals	App	Goals	App	Goals	App	Goals	App	Goals
Team Wellington (New Zealand Football Championship)	2006–07	12	4							12	4
Team Wellington (New Zealand Football Championship)	Club Total	12	4							12	4
Club	Season	USL-1								Total
Club	Season	App	Goals	App	Goals	App	Goals	App	Goals	App	Goals
Minnesota Thunder (USL First Division)	2008	11	0							11	0
Minnesota Thunder (USL First Division)	Club Total	11	0							11	0
Club	Season	NZFC		Chatham Cup		Club World Cup		Oceania		Total
Club	Season	App	Goals	App	Goals	App	Goals	App	Goals	App	Goals
Team Wellington (New Zealand Football Championship)	2008–09	7	4							7	4
Team Wellington (New Zealand Football Championship)	2009–10	15	4							15	4
Team Wellington (New Zealand Football Championship)	Club Total	22	8							20	6
Career totals		76	14							76	14
Last updated 30 April 2010

== See also ==
- New Zealand national football team
- New Zealand at the FIFA World Cup
- New Zealand national football team results
- List of New Zealand international footballers
