= Jayson Timatua =

Vanuatuan footballer

Personal information
- Date of birth: 27 December 1998 (age 27)
- Place of birth: Vanuatu
- Height: 1.75 m (5 ft 9 in)
- Position: Midfielder

Team information
- Current team: Galaxy

Senior career*
Years	Team	Apps	(Gls)
2017–2019	Shepherds United		
2019–2022	Tafea		
2022-	Galaxy		

International career^{‡}
- Vanuatu U17
- Vanuatu U20
2018–	Vanuatu	2	(0)
- Vanuatu Futsal
Medal record
Men's football
Representing Vanuatu
OFC Nations Cup
Runner-up	2024 Fiji/Vanuatu
OFC U-20 Championship
Runner-up	2016 Tonga/Vanuatu
Pacific Mini Games
Gold medal – first place	2017 Vanuatu
- * Club domestic league appearances and goals ‡ National team caps and goals as of 21 February 2019

Jayson Timatua (born 27 December 1998) is a Vanuatuan footballer who plays as a midfielder for Tafea and the Vanuatu national football team.

He has also been capped at the under-17 and under-20 levels.

== Honours ==
Vanuatu

- OFC Nations Cup: Runner-up, 2024
- Pacific Mini Games: Gold Medalist, 2017

Vanuatu U20

- OFC U-20 Championship: Runner-up, 2016
