= 2025 OFC Futsal Men's Cup =

2025 OFC Futsal Nations Cup
Tournament details
- Host country: Fiji
- City: Suva
- Dates: 20–24 September 2025
- Teams: 5 (from 1 confederation)
- Venue: 1 (in 1 host city)

Final positions
- Champions: Solomon Islands (7th title)
- Runners-up: New Zealand
- Third place: Fiji
- Fourth place: Vanuatu

Tournament statistics
- Matches played: 10
- Goals scored: 62 (6.2 per match)
- Attendance: 6,130 (613 per match)
- Top scorer(s): (New Zealand) En Watanabe (5 goals)
- Best player: (Solomon Islands) Alvin Hou
- Best goalkeeper: (Solomon Islands) Cliff Sasau
- Fair play award: Solomon Islands; Tuvalu

The 2025 OFC Futsal Nations Cup was the 15th edition of the OFC Futsal Nations Cup (previously called the OFC Futsal Championship), the international futsal championship organised by the Oceania Football Confederation (OFC) for the men's national teams of Oceania. It was held in Fiji from 20 to 24 September 2025.

New Zealand are the defending champions, after defeating Tahiti in the 2023 final.

== Teams ==
Four of the 11 FIFA-affiliated national teams from OFC will enter the tournament. One of two associated OFC member team Tuvalu has entered the cup as well. Tuvalu returned to regional stage after 14 years.

Team	Appearance	Previous best performance
Fiji (Hosts)	12th	Runners-up (1999, 2009, 2010)
New Zealand	12th	Champions (2022, 2023)
Solomon Islands	11th	Champions (2008, 2009, 2010, 2011, 2016, 2019)
Vanuatu	14th	Runners-up (1992, 1996)
Tuvalu	4th	Seventh place (2008, 2010)

Teams do not enter in the competition:

- American Samoa
- Cook Islands
- Kiribati
- New Caledonia
- Papua New Guinea
- Samoa
- Tahiti
- Tonga

== Venue ==
The matches will be played at the Vodafone Arena in Suva.

The original location for the event were Solomon Islands and Honiara. However Oceania Football Confederation (OFC) announced on 15 July 2025 that Fiji has been handed hosting rights for the OFC Futsal Men’s Cup 2025 after the tournament was relocated from the Solomon Islands due to logistical issues.

== Media coverage ==
All games were streamed via FIFA+ platform as Fifa+ holds rights for all OFC competitions in the period 2024-2025. The commentary was provided from Satish Narain

Oceania Football, website of governing body OFC and independent website Friends of Football NZ provided game reports and tournament news.

== Format and draw ==
Unlike in previous versions of the tournament, the 2025 tournament features a purely round robin format, with the champion being decided directly from the round robin stage, without a later final playoff. As five teams are playing, there will be five two-game rounds, with one team taking a by in each round. The rounds will take place on five consecutive days from Saturday 20 September to Wednesday 24 September.

The draw deciding the matches took place on 19 August 2025 at the OFC Home Of Football in Auckland, New Zealand.

== Group stage ==
All times are local, FJT (UTC+12).

=== Main Group ===
Pos	Team	Pld	W	D	L	GF	GA	GD	Pts
1	Solomon Islands	4	3	1	0	15	4	+11	10
2	New Zealand	4	3	0	1	20	7	+13	9
3	Fiji (H)	4	2	0	2	14	20	−6	6
4	Vanuatu	4	1	1	2	9	11	−2	4
5	Tuvalu	4	0	0	4	4	20	−16	0

Source: OFC
(H) Hosts

==== First round ====
In the first round, the Solomon Islands beat the reigning 2022 champions, New Zealand by 2-1. This was their first win over New Zealand in six years. The tournament hosts, Fiji, beat Vanuatu 5-4.

20 September 2025
16:00

New Zealand	1–2	Solomon Islands
Wisniewski 19'	Report	Towoa 12'; Bunabo 32'

Vodafone Arena, Suva
Attendance: 700
Referee: Arnaud Llambrich (New Caledonia)
20 September 2025
19:00

Vanuatu	4–5	Fiji
Takaro 5', 25'; Vano 10'; Coulon 22'; Vano (red card) 34'	Report	Baravilalal 5', 31'; Chand 15'; Singh 26'; Hughes 34'; Khan (red card) 35'

Vodafone Arena, Suva
Attendance: 700
Referee: Benjamin Norman (New Zealand)

==== Second round ====
After the second round, the Solomon Islands defeated hosts Fiji 5:2.

21 September 2025
16:00

New Zealand	6–1	Tuvalu
Manickum 2', 10'; Watanabe 9', 37'; Wink 11'; Peden 13'	Report	Vine 28'

Vodafone Arena, Suva
Attendance: 400
Referee: Rex Kamusu (Solomon Island)
21 September 2025
19:00

Solomon Islands	5–2	Fiji
Do'Oro 12', 14'; Patty 4'; Bunabo 27'; Hou 35'	Report	Chand 38'; Baravilala 39'

Vodafone Arena, Suva
Attendance: 1,150
Referee: Nicholas Backo (Australia)

==== Third round ====
The Gideons recorded a first-ever stalemate against Solomon Islands at an OFC Futsal Men’s Cup. Host Fiji earned a 4-1 victory over Tuvalu to progress to a match with New Zealand in the 4th round.

22 September 2025
16:00

Solomon Islands	1–1	Vanuatu
Patty 18'	Report	Takaro 32'

Vodafone Arena, Suva
Attendance: 550
Referee: Arnaud Llambrich (New Caledonia)
22 September 2025
19:00

Fiji	4–1	Tuvalu
Hughes 10'; Nand 11'; Baravilalal 19' (pen.); Khan 20'	Report	Nukulafoa 25'

Vodafone Arena, Suva
Attendance: 350
Referee: Philip Mana (Solomon Islands)

==== Fourth round ====
Two so far winless teams met, with Vanuatu defeating Vanuatu. The host Fiji fell in their final match 10-3 to New Zealand.

23 September 2025
16:00

Tuvalu	2–3	Vanuatu
Nukulafoa 31', 39'	Report	Alick 24'; Mesau 30'; Takaro 39'

Vodafone Arena, Suva
Attendance: 280
Referee: Benjamin Norman (New Zealand )
23 September 2025
19:00

Fiji	3–10	New Zealand
Singh 10'; Wink 12' (o.g.); Sharma 21'	Report	Fatialofa 3'; Watanabe 7', 37' (pen.); Ali 8'; Wink 24'; Peden 28'; Ditfort 32', 36'; Sharplin 35'; Martin 35'

Vodafone Arena, Suva
Attendance: 700
Referee: Rex Kamusu (Solomon Island)

==== Fifth round ====
Kicking off the last day of competition, Vanuatu took on New Zealand for second place. The scores were 3–1 at full time and New Zealand claimed second place overall. Solomon Islands won overall with a 7-0 victory over Tuvalu.

24 September 2025
16:00

Vanuatu	1–3	New Zealand
Alick 17' (pen.)	Report	Wink 0'; Sharplin 10'; Watanabe 24'

Vodafone Arena, Suva
Attendance: 300
Referee: Nicholas Backo (Australia)
24 September 2025
19:00

Tuvalu	0–7	Solomon Islands
	Report	Do'Oro 2', 24'; Otainao 19'; Patty 25'; Misitana 26'; Timi 29'; Mana 34'

Vodafone Arena, Suva
Attendance: 1,000
Referee: Arnaud Llambrich (New Caledonia)

== Awards ==
The following awards were given at the conclusion of the tournament.

Award	Player
Golden Ball	(Solomon Islands) Alvin Hou
Golden Boot	(New Zealand) En Watanabe
Golden Gloves	(Solomon Islands) Cliff Sasau
Fair Play Award	Tuvalu; Solomon Islands

== Goalscorers ==
There were 62 goals scored in 10 matches, for an average of 6.2 goals per match.

5 goals

- (New Zealand) En Watanabe

4 goals

- (Fiji) Filipe Baravilala
- (Vanuatu) Paul Takaro
- (Solomon Islands) Calvin Do’oro

3 goals

- (Tuvalu) Aloesi Nukulafoa
- (New Zealand) Cooper Wink
- (Solomon Islands) Jayroll Patty

2 goals

- (Fiji) Bruce Hughes
- (Fiji) Rajneel Singh
- (New Zealand) Jordan Ditfort
- (New Zealand) Dylan Manickum
- (New Zealand) Matthew Peden
- (New Zealand) Casey Sharplin
- (Solomon Islands) Owen Bunabo
- (Vanuatu) Justin Alick

1 goal

- (Fiji) Nikil Chand Chand
- (Fiji) Praschant Chand
- (Fiji) Ramzan Khan
- (Fiji) Merrill Nand
- (Fiji) Neeraj Sharma
- (New Zealand) Rahan Ali
- (New Zealand) Philip Fatialofa
- (New Zealand) Ethan Martin
- (New Zealand) Logan Wisnewski
- (Solomon Islands) Alvin Hou
- (Solomon Islands) Elvis Mana
- (Solomon Islands) Clifford Misitana
- (Solomon Islands) Charlie Otainao
- (Solomon Islands) Jayson Timi
- (Solomon Islands) Samuel Tovoa
- (Tuvalu) Keni Vine
- (Vanuatu) Michael Coulon
- (Vanuatu) Sandy Mesau
- (Vanuatu) Charlie Vano

1 own goal

- (New Zealand) Cooper Wink (against Fiji)

== Match officials ==
Main Referees

- (Australia) Nicholas Backo
- (Australia) Benjamin Norman
- (Fiji) Ronil Chand
- (New Caledonia) Arnaud Llambrich
- (New Zealand) Benjamin Norman
- (New Zealand) Max Lauridsen
- (Solomon Islands) Fred Ete
- (Solomon Islands) Rex Kamusu
- (Solomon Islands) Philip Mana
- (Vanuatu) Frank Vira

== Organising Committee ==
Fiji FA CEO: Mohammed Yusuf and Vice-president Fiji FA: Mr Ritesh Vee Pratap
