= 2019 OFC Futsal Nations Cup =

Tournament details
- Host country: New Caledonia
- City: Nouméa
- Dates: 27 October – 2 November 2019
- Teams: 8 (from 1 confederation)
- Venue: 1 (in 1 host city)

Final positions
- Champions: Solomon Islands (6th title)
- Runners-up: New Zealand
- Third place: Tahiti
- Fourth place: New Caledonia

Tournament statistics
- Matches played: 18
- Goals scored: 185 (10.28 per match)
- Top scorer(s): (New Zealand) Nicky Malivuk (French Polynesia) Olivier Hirihiri
- Best player: (New Zealand) Dylan Manickum
- Best goalkeeper: (Solomon Islands) Anthony Talo
- Fair play award: American Samoa

The 2019 OFC Futsal Nations Cup was the 12th edition of the OFC Futsal Nations Cup (previously called the OFC Futsal Championship), the international futsal championship organised by the Oceania Football Confederation (OFC) for the men's national teams of Oceania.

In November 2018, it was announced that New Caledonia would host the competition. The tournament was held from 27 October to 2 November.

The winner qualified as the OFC representative at the 2021 FIFA Futsal World Cup (originally 2020 but postponed due to COVID-19 pandemic) in Lithuania.

Solomon Islands were the defending champions, and successfully defended their title after defeating New Zealand in the final.

== Teams ==
Eight of the 11 FIFA-affiliated national teams from OFC entered the tournament.

Team	Appearance	Previous best performance
American Samoa	1st	Debut
Fiji	9th	Runners-up (2000, 2009, 2010)
New Caledonia (hosts)	8th	Runners-up (2014)
New Zealand	10th	Runners-up (2004, 2016)
Solomon Islands	8th	Champions (2008, 2009, 2010, 2011, 2016)
Tahiti	7th	Runners-up (2008, 2011)
Tonga	1st	Debut
Vanuatu	12th	Runners-up (1992, 1996)

Did not enter

- Cook Islands
- Papua New Guinea
- Samoa

== Venue ==
The matches were played at the L'Arène du Sud in Païta.

== Draw ==
The draw of the tournament was held on 6 May 2019 at the OFC Academy in Auckland, New Zealand. The eight teams were drawn into two groups of four teams. The top two ranked teams, Solomon Islands and New Zealand, were drawn into position 1 of Group A or B, and the bottom two ranked teams, American Samoa and Tonga, were drawn into position 4 of Group A or B, while the remaining teams were drawn into position 2 or 3 of Group A or B.

== Group stage ==
The top two teams of each group advance to the semi-finals. The bottom two teams enter the 5th–8th place play-offs.

All times are local, NCT (UTC+11).

=== Group A ===
Pos	Team	Pld	W	D	L	GF	GA	GD	Pts	Qualification
1	New Zealand	3	3	0	0	21	3	+18	9	Knockout stage
2	New Caledonia (H)	3	2	0	1	22	5	+17	6	Knockout stage
3	Vanuatu	3	1	0	2	12	22	−10	3	5th–8th place play-offs
4	American Samoa	3	0	0	3	3	28	−25	0	5th–8th place play-offs

Source: OFC
(H) Hosts
28 October 2019
15:00

American Samoa	0–9	New Zealand
	Report	Manickum 1', 12', 36'; Malivuk 0', 15'; Ashby-Peckham 35', 36'; Margetts 19'; Eakins 20'

L'Arène du Sud, Païta
Attendance: 150
Referee: Philip Mana (Solomon Islands)
28 October 2019
19:00

Vanuatu	1–11	New Caledonia
Mesau 15'	Report	Pei 14', 18', 32'; Namuli 14', 27'; Xuma 15', 16'; Sahuliwa 23', 32'; Delaunay 11'; Sele 35'

L'Arène du Sud, Païta
Attendance: 300
Referee: Teraimaeva Make (Tahiti)

29 October 2019
17:00

New Zealand	8–1	Vanuatu
Malivuk 1', 10'; Ditfort 2', 30'; Hawkins 11'; Lissington 29'; Wisniewski 31'; Manickum 32'	Report	Hungai 29'

L'Arène du Sud, Païta
Attendance: 130
Referee: Philip Mana (Solomon Islands)
29 October 2019
19:00

American Samoa	0–9	New Caledonia
	Report	Humuni 5', 25'; Sele 7', 37'; Delaunay 22', 29'; Qenegete 33'; Xuma 37'; Guitton 39'

L'Arène du Sud, Païta
Attendance: 250
Referee: Francis RONI (SOL)

30 October 2019
15:00

Vanuatu	10–3	American Samoa
Mesau 9', 30', 38'; P. Alick 6', 30'; Wilkins 4', 5'; Vano 18'; Napau 18'; Soromon 18'	Report	Taumua 22'; Pouli 25'; Kaleopa 32'

L'Arène du Sud, Païta
Attendance: 250
Referee: Teraimaeva MAKE (TAH)
30 October 2019
19:00

New Zealand	4–2	New Caledonia
Manickum 17', 18'; Malivuk 13'; Margetts 39'	Report	Humuni 5', 25'; Sele 11'; Xuma 39'

L'Arène du Sud, Païta
Attendance: 600
Referee: Rex KAMUSU (SOL)

=== Group B ===
Pos	Team	Pld	W	D	L	GF	GA	GD	Pts	Qualification
1	Solomon Islands	3	3	0	0	24	5	+19	9	Knockout stage
2	Tahiti	3	2	0	1	37	10	+27	6	Knockout stage
3	Fiji	3	1	0	2	11	17	−6	3	5th–8th place play-offs
4	Tonga	3	0	0	3	6	46	−40	0	5th–8th place play-offs

Source: OFC
28 October 2019
13:00

Tonga	2–13	Solomon Islands
Feao 29'; Vea 29'	Report	Ragomo 1', 15', 17', 27'; Bule 19', 21', 31', 32'; Stevenson 16'; Makau 17'; Maeluma 19'; Ray 23'; Sia 29'

L'Arène du Sud, Païta
Attendance: 150
Referee: Malkom MAYOHO (VAN)
28 October 2019
17:00

Fiji	1–11	Tahiti
S. Hughes 28'	Report	Tehau 13', 17', 33', 38'; Barsinas 17', 26'; Tave 29', 37' (2pen.); Riaria 6'; Hirihiri 15'; Wong 28'; Soromon

L'Arène du Sud, Païta
Attendance: 160
Referee: Chris SINCLAIR (NZL)

29 October 2019
13:00

Solomon Islands	7–2	Tahiti
Stevenson 15', 21', 22'; Hou 10', 34'; Otainao 36'; Kaiha 19' (o.g.)	Report	Wong 18'; Riaria 34'

L'Arène du Sud, Païta
Attendance: 175
Referee: Chris SINCLAIR (NZL)
29 October 2019
15:00

Tonga	2–9	Fiji
Taufa 32', 39'	Report	Levaci 13', 36'; Baravilala 37', 38'; Khem 6'; Verevou 12'; S. Hughes 32'; B. Hughes 38'; Wawanaivalu 39'

L'Arène du Sud, Païta
Attendance: 100
Referee: Charlemagne WAHEO (NCL)

30 October 2019
13:00

Tahiti	24–2	Tonga
Hirihiri 6', 11', 19', 33', 36'; Tetaura 5', 14'; Tehau 9' (pen.), 28'; Auti 11', 12'; Tanata 13', 34'; Kaiha 19', 29'; Tave 19', 37'; Y. Wong 21'; Barsinas 25'; Riaria 32'; Otukolo 7' (o.g.), 38' (o.g.); Taufa 3' (o.g.); Polovili 29' (o.g.)	Report	Taufa 20'; Aho 24'

L'Arène du Sud, Païta
Attendance: 80
Referee: Arnaud LLAMBRICH (NCL)
30 October 2019
17:00

Solomon Islands	4–1	Fiji
Hou 16'; Egeta 18'; Otainao 36'; Mateisuva 38' (o.g.)	Report	Dave 16'

L'Arène du Sud, Païta
Attendance: 130
Referee: Antony RILEY (NZL)

== 5th–8th place play-offs ==
Tonga was not allowed to play the 5th-8th place play-offs because many players were diagnosed with measles. It is important to remember that this tournament was held during a measles outbreak.

=== Bracket (5th–8th place) ===
Play-off semi-finals
1 November
Vanuatu (w/o)	3
Tonga	0
1 November
Fiji	6
American Samoa	2

Fifth place match
2 November
Vanuatu	4
Fiji	6
Seventh place match
2 November
Tonga	0
American Samoa (w/o)	3

=== Play-off semi-finals ===
1 November 2019
11:30

Fiji	6–2	American Samoa
Verevou 14', 34'; Dave 32'; Baravilala 35'; Kaleopa 14' (o.g.); Faamoana 22' (o.g.)	Report	Kaleopa 18'; Tualaulelei 37'

L'Arène du Sud, Païta
Attendance: 60
Referee: Charlemagne Waheo (New Caledonia)

1 November 2019
14:00

Vanuatu	3–0 (walkover)	Tonga
	Report

L'Arène du Sud, Païta

=== Seventh place play-off ===
2 November 2019
11:30

Tonga	0–3 (walkover)	American Samoa
	Report

L'Arène du Sud, Païta

=== Fifth place play-off ===
2 November 2019
14:00

Vanuatu	4–6	Fiji
Nalu Napau 3'; Doland 6'; Kalo 14'; Hungai 35'	Report	Verevou 2', 8', 19'; Khem 12', 39'; Tivulu 21'

L'Arène du Sud, Païta
Attendance: 150
Referee: Charlemagne Waheo (New Caledonia) ]

== Knockout stage ==
=== Bracket (1st–4th place) ===
Semi-finals
1 November
Solomon Islands	5
New Caledonia	1
1 November
New Zealand	3
Tahiti	2

Final
2 November
Solomon Islands	5 (2)
New Zealand	5 (1)
Third place match
2 November
New Caledonia	5 (1)
Tahiti	5 (3)

=== Semi-finals ===
1 November 2019
16:30

Solomon Islands	5–1	New Caledonia
Stevenson 2', 22'; Sia 39', 39'; Otainao 14'	Report	Sele 33'

L'Arène du Sud, Païta
Attendance: 1200
Referee: Antony RILEY (NZL)

1 November 2019
19:00

New Zealand	3–2	Tahiti
Hawkins 26', 27'; Ashby-Peckham 26'	Report	Tetaura 1'; Kaiha 4'

L'Arène du Sud, Païta
Attendance: 800
Referee: Rex KAMUSU (SOL)

=== Third place match ===
2 November 2019
16:30

New Caledonia	5–5 (a.e.t.)	Tahiti
Humuni 17', 23'; Sahuliwa 33', 40'; Poadae 7'	Report	Tave 28', 41'; Tetaura 5'; Hirihiri 22'; Auti 25'
Penalties
	1–3

L'Arène du Sud, Païta
Attendance: 1000
Referee: Chris SINCLAIR (NZL)

=== Final ===
Winner qualifies for 2021 FIFA Futsal World Cup.

2 November 2019
19:00

Solomon Islands	5–5 (a.e.t.)	New Zealand
Hou 32', 38'; Egeta 18'; Maeluma 39'; Bule 40'	Report	Malivuk 0', 28'; Ditfort 33'; Margetts 37'; Ashby-Peckham 40'
Penalties
	2–1

L'Arène du Sud, Païta
Attendance: 2000
Referee: Teraimaeva MAKE (TAH)

== Winners ==
2019 OFC Futsal Nations Cup

**Solomon Islands**
**Sixth title**

Solomon Islands qualified for the 2021 FIFA Futsal World Cup. They have qualified for the FIFA Futsal World Cup for the fourth consecutive time.

Team	Qualified on	Previous appearances in FIFA Futsal World Cup^{1}
Solomon Islands	2 November 2019	3 (2008, 2012, 2016)

^{1} Bold indicates champions for that year. Italic indicates hosts for that year.

== Awards ==
The following awards were given at the conclusion of the tournament.

Award	Player
Golden Ball	(New Zealand) Dylan Manickum
Golden Boot	(New Zealand) Nicky Malivuk (French Polynesia) Olivier Hirihiri
Golden Gloves	(Solomon Islands) Anthony Talo
Fair Play Award	American Samoa

== Goalscorers ==
There were 185 goals scored in 18 matches, for an average of 10.3 goals per match.

7 goals

- (New Zealand) Micky Malivuk
- (French Polynesia) Olivier Hirihiri

6 goals

- (New Zealand) Dylan Manickum
- (French Polynesia) Teaonui Tehau
- (French Polynesia) Antoine Tave
- (Solomon Islands) George Stevenson

5 goals

- (Fiji) Iosefo Verevou
- (New Caledonia) Jean-Philippe Sele
- (Solomon Islands) Jeffery Bule

4 goals

- (New Caledonia) Aser Xuma
- (Vanuatu) Sandy Mesau
- (Solomon Islands) Elliot Ragomo

== Match officials ==
Referees

- (New Caledonia) Arnaud Llambrich
- (New Caledonia) Charlemagne Waheo
- (New Zealand) Antony Riley
- (New Zealand) Chris Sinclair
- (Solomon Islands) Rex Kamusu
- (Solomon Islands) Philip Mana
- (Solomon Islands) Francis Roni
- (French Polynesia) Teraimaeva Make
- (Vanuatu) Malkom Mayoho
