= 2008 FIFA Futsal World Cup qualification =

== Africa (CAF) ==
Took place in Tripoli, Libya from 21 March to 30 March 2008.

- **Final standing & qualified nations**
1. **Libya**
2. **Egypt**
3. Morocco
4. Mozambique
5. Angola
6. Nigeria
7. Tunisia
8. South Africa
9. Zambia
10. Cameroon
  - Bold: Qualified to World Cup

== Europe (UEFA) ==
Took place in many countries and cities from 23 February to 16 April 2008.

- **Participants & qualified nations**
1. **Spain**
2. **Portugal**
3. **Italy**
4. **Russia**
5. **Ukraine**
6. **Czech Republic**
7. Romania
8. Hungary
9. Belarus
10. Croatia
11. Slovenia
12. Bosnia and Herzegovina
13. Azerbaijan
14. Poland
15. Slovakia
16. Israel
17. Albania
18. Kazakhstan
19. Lithuania
20. Netherlands
21. Belgium
22. Turkey
23. Greece
24. Macedonia
25. Moldova
26. Finland
27. Cyprus
28. Serbia
29. Bulgaria
30. Latvia
31. Andorra
32. Armenia
33. Montenegro
34. Malta
35. Georgia
36. England
37. Estonia
38. France
  - Bold: Qualified to World Cup
  - Italic: Lost in Play-offs

== Asia (AFC) ==
Quarter-finals
May 15 – Bangkok
**Thailand**	**5**
Australia	2
May 15 – Bangkok
Uzbekistan	1
**China**	**4**
May 15 – Bangkok
**Japan**	**4**
Kyrgyzstan	0
May 15 – Bangkok
**Iran**	**9**
Lebanon	1

Semi-finals
May 16 – Bangkok
**Thailand**	**7**
China	3
May 16 – Bangkok
Japan	0
**Iran**	**1**

Final
May 18 – Bangkok
Thailand	0
**Iran**	**4**
Third place
May 18 – Bangkok
China	3
**Japan**	**5**

Iran, Thailand, Japan & China qualified

== North America, Central America and Caribbean (CONCACAF) ==
Took place in Guatemala City, Guatemala from 2 June to 8 June 2008.

- **Final standing & qualified nations**
1. **Guatemala**
2. **Cuba**
3. **United States**
4. Panama
5. Mexico
6. Costa Rica
7. Trinidad and Tobago
8. Haiti
  - Bold: Qualified to World Cup

== Oceania (OFC) ==
Took place in Suva, Fiji from 8 June to 14 June 2008.

- Final standing & qualified nations:
1. **Solomon Islands**
2. Tahiti
3. Vanuatu
4. New Zealand
5. Fiji
6. New Caledonia
7. Tuvalu
  - Bold: Qualified to World Cup

== South America (CONMEBOL) ==
Took place in Montevideo, Uruguay from 23 June to 28 June 2008.

- Final standing & qualified nations:
1. **Brazil**
2. **Uruguay**
3. **Argentina**
4. **Paraguay***
5. Colombia
6. Ecuador
7. Peru
8. Bolivia
9. Venezuela
10. Chile
  - Bold: Qualified to World Cup

* Qualified to World Cup since Brazil qualified as the host of the championship
