= 2025 OFC Futsal Nations Cup squads =

The 2025 OFC Futsal Nations Cup was the 15th edition of the OFC Futsal Nations Cup (previously called the OFC Futsal Championship), the international futsal championship organised by the Oceania Football Confederation (OFC) for the men's national teams of Oceania. It was held in New Zealand from 20 to 24 September 2025.

== Main group ==
=== New Zealand ===
Head coach: Marvin Eakins

New Zealand announced their 15-player squad on 17 September 2025.

No.	Pos.	Player	Date of birth (age)	Caps	Goals	Club
1	GK	Patrick Steele	14 November 2000 (aged 24)	12	0	(New Zealand Football) Waikato Rapid
6	FW	Rahan Ali	3 April 1997 (aged 28)	15	16	(Football Australia) Moreland Blues Futsal
8	DF	Logan Wisniewski	16 November 2000 (aged 24)	20	5	Unattached
10	MF	Dylan Manichum (captain)	16 June 1992 (aged 33)	66	38	(New Zealand Football) Auckland City FC
11	MF	Jordan Ditfort	9 June 1998 (aged 27)	26	13	Unattached
12	GK	Hamish Mitschell	19 August 1995 (aged 30)			(New Zealand Football) Canterbury Dragons
2	MF	En Watanabe	18 January 2001 (aged 24)			(New Zealand Football) Southern United
3	DF	Mark Zimmerman	2 July 2002 (aged 23)			(New Zealand Football) Canterbury Dragons
4	MF	Matthew Peden	5 February 2003 (aged 22)	22	3	Unattached
7	DF	Ethan Martin	11 January 2000 (aged 25)	15	8	(Royal Dutch Football Association) ZVV Kroeven
9	MF	Steve Ashby-Pechman	9 August 1995 (aged 30)	44	17	(New Zealand Football) Auckland City FC
13	DF	Cooper Wink	7 February 2004 (aged 21)			(New Zealand Football) Southern United
14	MF	Casey Sharplin	26 August 2001 (aged 23)	15	5	(New Zealand Football) Waikato Rapid
15	FW	Philip Fatialofa	6 June 1997 (aged 28)	40	3	(New Zealand Football) Capital Futsal

=== Fiji ===
Head coach: Jose Gerardo

Coaching team: Shameet Kumar- Goalkeeper Coach, Sushil Singh- Manager, Dharmend Chand- Kit Manager

Fiji announced their 14-player squad on 9 September 2025.

No.	Pos.	Player	Date of birth (age)	Caps	Goals	Club
14	GK	Kitione Baleloa (captain)	29 July 1991 (aged 34)			(Fiji Football Association) Unattached
3	DF	Rajneel Singh	24 January 2001 (aged 24)			(Fiji Football Association) Tailevu Naitasir BSC
5	DF	Filipe Baravilala (captain)	25 November 1994 (aged 30)			(Fiji Football Association) Navua F.C.
6		Ramzan Khan	22 November 1999 (aged 25)			(Fiji Football Association) Suva FA
9		Merrill Nand	22 September 2000 (aged 24)			(Fiji Football Association) Tailevu Naitasiri BSC
1	GK	Kartik Sharma	6 October 2006 (aged 18)			(Fiji Football Association) Labasa Futsal
13	GK	Jasnil Kumar	1 January 1999 (aged 26)			(Fiji Football Association) Lami Futsal
2	DF	Nihil Chand	14 September 2000 (aged 25)			(Fiji Football Association) Lami Futsal
4	MF	Neeraj Sharma	27 April 2006 (aged 19)			(Fiji Football Association) Suva Futsal
7	DF	Prashant Chand	8 September 1999 (aged 26)			(Fiji Football Association) Suva Futsal
8	MF	Shahzaib Aziz	8 October 2006 (aged 18)			(Fiji Football Association) Labasa Futsal
10	FW	Bruce Hughes	27 March 1997 (aged 28)			(Fiji Football Association) Predators FC
11	DF	Shivnal Prasad	20 January 1999 (aged 26)			(Fiji Football Association) Suva Futsal
13	MF	Justin Kumar	11 July 2002 (aged 22)			(Fiji Football Association) Suva FutsalDhani Boys

=== Solomon Islands ===
Head coach: Dickson Kadau

Coaching team: Arthur Barko- Assistant Coach, Stanley Puirana- Goalkeeper Coach, Glen Buka- Team Manager, Simon Wale- Team Doctor, Seru Nacanieli- Kit Manager

Solomon Islands announced their 15-player squad on 18 September 2025 on the Facebook page of in-depth Solomons media. Facebook is not officially accepted as the Wikipedia source.

No.	Pos.	Player	Date of birth (age)	Caps	Goals	Club
1	GK	Cliff Sasau	28 August 1976 (aged 49)			(Solomon Islands Football Federation) Solomon Warrior
19	DF	Alvin Hou	18 September 1996 (aged 29)			(Solomon Islands Football Federation) Kossa
3	DF	Calvin Do'Oro	24 January 2001 (aged 24)			(China) Xiangyu FC--> (Solomon Islands) Dawn FC
9		Charlie Otainao (captain)	5 June 1992 (aged 33)			(Solomon Islands Football Federation) Central Coast FC
13		Owen Bunabo	17 June 2005 (aged 20)			(Solomon Islands Football Federation) St Nicholas Solomon Islands Futsal Team
12	GK	Leonard Auwakea	23 November 2003 (aged 21)			(Solomon Islands Football Federation) Haura FC
4		Jayroll Patty	5 June 2007 (aged 18)			(Solomon Islands Football Federation) Wechon FC-->Dawn FC
5	DF	Clifford Misitana	7 January 1999 (aged 26)			(Solomon Islands Football Federation) Mataks FC
6		Elis Mana	9 March 2000 (aged 25)			(Solomon Islands Football Federation) Mataks FC
7		Fred Wasike	26 September 2002 (aged 22)			(Solomon Islands Football Federation) Dawn FC
8		Jayson Timi	25 March 2004 (aged 21)			(Solomon Islands Football Federation) Salt FC
10		Sammy Lalo	1 January 2005 (aged 20)			(Solomon Islands Football Federation) Salt FC
11		Samuel Tovoa	12 September 1998 (aged 26)			(Solomon Islands Football Federation)
14		William Tahariu	20 April 2003 (aged 22)			(Solomon Islands Football Federation) Salt FC

=== Vanuatu ===
Head coach: Tito Quai

Coaching team: Terry Malapa- Assistant Coach, Mahina Garry- Team Manager, Samuel Taffo- Media

Vanuatu announced their 15-player squad on 29 August 2025.

No.	Pos.	Player	Date of birth (age)	Caps	Goals	Club
1	GK	Antonio Norman	14 November 2000 (aged 24)			(Vanuatu Football Federation)
2	DF	Michel Coulon (captain)	3 December 1995 (aged 29)			(Vanuatu Football Federation) Hornets FC
5		Kevin Donald	16 November 2000 (aged 24)			(Vanuatu Football Federation) Greenstone FC
7		Kernly Lehi	20 January 2004 (aged 21)			(Vanuatu Football Federation) Greenstone FC
9		Keshly Joseph	7 September 1999 (aged 26)			(Vanuatu Football Federation) Southern Legend
12	GK	Charlie Boe	23 September 1997 (aged 27)			(Vanuatu Football Federation)
3	MF	Athanas Alick	23 July 2001 (aged 24)			(Vanuatu Football Federation) Real Seaside
4	DF	Kerol Alex	10 January 2001 (aged 24)			(Vanuatu Football Federation) T-United
6		Paul Takaro	6 April 2007 (aged 18)			(Vanuatu Football Federation) Unattached
8		Sandy Mesau	15 June 1997 (aged 28)			(Vanuatu Football Federation) T-United FC
10		Justine Alick	20 January 1998 (aged 27)			(Vanuatu Football Federation) Southern Legend
11		Andrew Vuti	11 February 2004 (aged 21)			(Vanuatu Football Federation) Ascension Futsal
13	DF	Steve Nona	1 October 2004 (aged 20)			(Vanuatu Football Federation) Unattached
14	DF	Charlie Vano	23 September 1999 (aged 25)			(Vanuatu Football Federation) UNV FC

=== Tuvalu ===
Head coach: Pasene Giale

Tuvalu did not announced their player squad officially. Oceania Football Confederation (OFC) made a statement with TIFA General Secretary Matini Vailopa about Tuvalu return to the regional stage after 14 years.

No.	Pos.	Player	Date of birth (age)	Caps	Goals	Club
1	GK	Katepu Iosua	5 November 1988 (aged 36)			(Tuvalu Islands Football Association) Tofaga FC
2	DF	Aloesi Nukulafoa	1 February 2005 (aged 20)			
3	MF	Paolo Vailine	11 February 2002 (aged 23)			
4	MF	Taufaiva Ionatana	20 August 2005 (aged 20)			
12	DF	Reme Timuani (captain)	14 October 1991 (aged 33)			
14	GK	Tupau Tupau	29 April 2004 (aged 21)			
5	GK	Vaeoma Auina				
6	GK	Jason Alama	31 October 2002 (aged 22)			
7		Iosefa Tamoa				
8	MF	Flamez Mokeni	29 March 2002 (aged 23)			
9	MF	Keni Vine	25 February 2002 (aged 23)			
10	FW	Matti Uaelesi	14 August 1992 (aged 33)			
10		Maalosi Alefaio				
