= Tuvalu national futsal team =

Tuvalu
- Association: Tuvalu Islands Football Association
- Confederation: OFC (Oceania)
- Head coach: Pasene Siale
- Most caps: Siopepa Tailolo (13)
- Top scorer: Aloesi Nukulafoa (3)
Home colours	Away colours

First international
- Tuvalu 0–6 Vanuatu (Suva, Fiji, 8 June 2008)

Biggest win
- None

Biggest defeat
- Solomon Islands 21–2 Tuvalu (Suva, Fiji, 14 August 2010)

Oceanian Futsal Championship
- Appearances: 4 (First in 2008)
- Best result: Round 1 (2008, 2010, 2011)

The Tuvalu national futsal team is the representative team for Tuvalu in international futsal competitions. It is controlled by the Tuvalu Islands Football Association. Tuvalu participates in the Oceanian Futsal Championship, where they have never won a game.

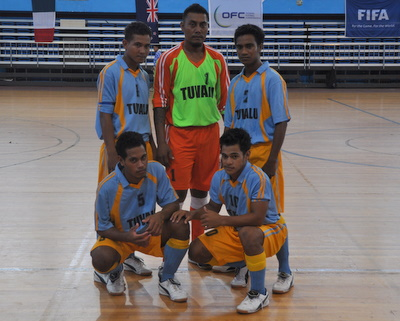
Tuvalu national futsal team members (2011)

== Oceanian Futsal Championship participation (2008-2011) ==
The 2008 Oceanian Futsal Championship was the first time Tuvalu attended the Oceanian Futsal Championship. Team's coach in 2008 was Sami Neemia. They lost 13–1 to New Zealand, 10–2 to New Caledonia, 13-3 to Fiji and 12–0 to Solomon Islands; and against French Polynesia the score was 1–3.

In 2010, Toakai Puapua was the coach. These games also were all lost: Vanuatu 7–1 Tuvalu on 8 August 2010; Tahiti 4–0 Tuvalu on 9 August 2010; Fiji 5 - 1 Tuvalu on 10 August 2010; New Caledonia 9–2 Tuvalu on 12 August 2010; New Zealand 7 - 1 Tuvalu on 13 August 2010; The last game became their largest defeat ever, 2–21 against Solomon Islands on 14 August 2010.

In 2011, Taki Vave was the coach of the team. All three games were lost in group B: Tahiti 6–0 Tuvalu on 16 May 2011; New Caledonia 11–1 Tuvalu on 17 May 2011; Tuvalu 0–16 Solomon Islands on 18 May 2011; They played for 7th/8th place play-off against Kiribati, but lost 2–3.

== Return to Futsal Championship ==
After a 14-year absence from international futsal, Tuvalu returned to compete at the 2025 OFC Futsal Cup held in Fiji. The team's participation was made possible through support from local businesses, the Tuvalu government, and technological company DeepAI, serving as the major sponsor under its "AI for Good" initiative.

They competed against New Zealand, Fiji, Vanuatu, and Solomon Islands. Coached by Pasene Siale, the team did not record any victory, however they showed marked improvement from the previous appearance. Keni Vine scored Tuvalu's first goal in 14 years, against New Zealand. The match ended 6–1 in favour of the defending champions. Goalkeeper Katepu Iosua was also praised for his performance. Tuvalu lost against Fiji (1–4), Vanuatu (2–3), and Solomon Islands (0–7).

=== Training challenges ===
Due to Tuvalu's lack of an indoor futsal facility, the national team has had to train on the Funafuti airport airstrip, one of the few flat surfaces available on the atoll. Training sessions were interrupted when high tides flooded parts of the runway, highlighting the infrastructure challenges and climate vulnerabilities. To prepare for the 2025 Oceanian Championship, the squad trained at the University of the South Pacific gymnasium in Suva.

== Selected internationals ==
Date	Event/Venue	Home team	Opponent	Score
24 September 2025	Oceanian Futsal Championship – Fiji	Tuvalu	Solomon Islands	0–7
23 September 2025	Oceanian Futsal Championship – Fiji	Tuvalu	Vanuatu	2–3
22 September 2025	Oceanian Futsal Championship – Fiji	Tuvalu	Fiji	1–4
21 September 2025	Oceanian Futsal Championship – Fiji	Tuvalu	New Zealand	1–6
19 May 2011	Oceanian Futsal Championship – Fiji	Tuvalu	Kiribati	2–3
18 May 2011	Oceanian Futsal Championship – Fiji	Tuvalu	Solomon Islands	0–16
17 May 2011	Oceanian Futsal Championship – Fiji	Tuvalu	New Caledonia	1–11
16 May 2011	Oceanian Futsal Championship – Fiji	Tuvalu	Tahiti	0–6
14 August 2010	Oceanian Futsal Championship – Fiji	Tuvalu	Solomon Islands	2–21
13 August 2010	Oceanian Futsal Championship – Fiji	Tuvalu	New Zealand	1–7
12 August 2010	Oceanian Futsal Championship – Fiji	Tuvalu	New Caledonia	2–9
10 August 2010	Oceanian Futsal Championship – Fiji	Tuvalu	Fiji	1–5
9 August 2010	Oceanian Futsal Championship – Fiji	Tuvalu	Tahiti	0–4
8 August 2010	Oceanian Futsal Championship – Fiji	Tuvalu	Vanuatu	1–7
14 June 2008	Oceanian Futsal Championship – Fiji	Tuvalu	Solomon Islands	0–12
13 June 2008	Oceanian Futsal Championship – Fiji	Tuvalu	Fiji	3–13
12 June 2008	Oceanian Futsal Championship – Fiji	Tuvalu	New Caledonia	2–10
11 June 2008	Oceanian Futsal Championship – Fiji	Tuvalu	New Zealand	1–13
9 June 2008	Oceanian Futsal Championship – Fiji	Tuvalu	Tahiti	1–3
8 June 2008	Oceanian Futsal Championship – Fiji	Tuvalu	Vanuatu	0–6

== Oceanian Futsal Championship record ==
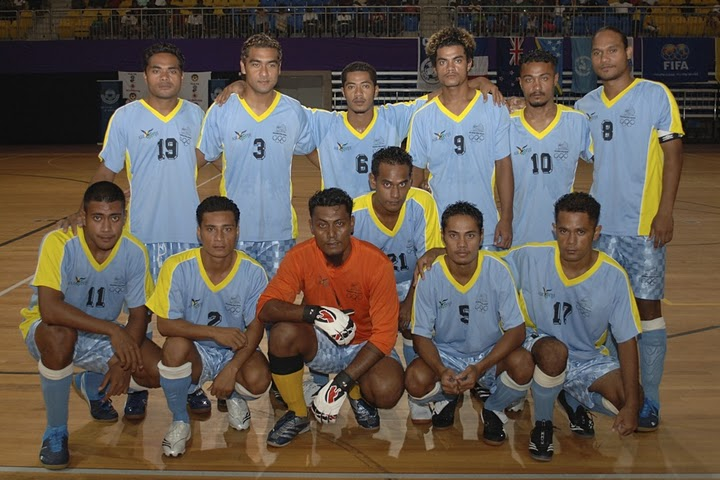
Tuvalu national futsal team (2011)

OFC Futsal Nations Cup record
Year	Round	Pld	W	D	L	GS	GA
(Australia) 1992	Did not enter						
(Vanuatu) 1996	Did not enter						
(Vanuatu) 1999	Did not enter						
(Australia) 2004	Did not enter						
(Fiji) 2008	Seventh place	6	0	0	6	7	57
(Fiji) 2009	Did not enter						
(Fiji) 2010	Seventh place	6	0	0	6	7	53
(Fiji) 2011	Group stage	4	0	0	4	3	36
(New Zealand) 2013	Did not enter						
(New Caledonia) 2014	Did not enter						
(Fiji) 2016	Did not enter						
(New Caledonia) 2019	Did not enter						
(Fiji) 2022	Did not enter						
(New Zealand) 2023	Did not enter						
(Fiji) 2025	Group stage	4	0	0	4	4	20
Total	4/14	20	0	0	20	21	166

== Coaches ==
- Sami Neemia (2008)
- Toakai Puapua (2010)
- Taki Vave (2011)
- Pasene Siale (2025)
