= 2016 OFC Futsal Championship =

Tournament details
- Host country: Fiji
- City: Suva
- Dates: 8–13 February 2016
- Teams: 6 (from 1 confederation)
- Venue: 1 (in 1 host city)

Final positions
- Champions: Solomon Islands (5th title)
- Runners-up: New Zealand
- Third place: Tahiti
- Fourth place: Vanuatu

Tournament statistics
- Matches played: 15
- Goals scored: 87 (5.8 per match)
- Top scorer: (Solomon Islands) George Stevenson (5 goals)
- Best player: (Solomon Islands) Elliot Ragomo
- Best goalkeeper: (Solomon Islands) Anthony Talo

The 2016 OFC Futsal Championship was the 11th edition of the OFC Futsal Championship, the annual international futsal championship organised by the Oceania Football Confederation (OFC) for the men's national teams of Oceania. The tournament was held in Suva, Fiji between 8–13 February 2016.

The tournament was originally to be held in Papeete, Tahiti, but was moved to Fiji after Tahiti withdrew. The 2015 tournament, which was originally scheduled to be held in Tahiti between 1–8 August 2015, was not played.

Same as previous editions held on the same year as the FIFA Futsal World Cup, the tournament acted as the OFC qualifiers for the World Cup. The winner of the tournament qualified for the 2016 FIFA Futsal World Cup in Colombia as the OFC representative.

Solomon Islands were crowned as champions for the fifth time on 13 February 2016, sealing their qualification to the World Cup.

== Teams ==
A total of six OFC member national teams entered the tournament.

Team	Appearance	Previous best performance
Fiji (hosts)	8th	Runners-up (2000, 2009, 2010)
New Caledonia	7th	Runners-up (2014)
New Zealand	9th	Runners-up (1992, 2004)
Solomon Islands	7th	Champions (2008, 2009, 2010, 2011)
Tahiti	6th	Runners-up (2008, 2011)
Vanuatu	11th	Runners-up (1996)

Did not enter
- American Samoa
- Cook Islands
- Papua New Guinea
- Samoa
- Tonga

== Venues ==
The matches were played at the Vodafone Arena in Suva.

== Matches ==
The tournament was played in round-robin format. There were three matches on each matchday. The draw for the fixtures was held on 16 December 2015 at the OFC Headquarters in Auckland, New Zealand.

All times were local, FJT (UTC+12).

Pos	Team	Pld	W	D	L	GF	GA	GD	Pts	Qualification
1	Solomon Islands	5	5	0	0	23	3	+20	15	2016 FIFA Futsal World Cup
2	New Zealand	5	4	0	1	16	8	+8	12	
3	Tahiti	5	3	0	2	18	10	+8	9	
4	Vanuatu	5	2	0	3	14	21	−7	6	
5	New Caledonia	5	1	0	4	11	18	−7	3	
6	Fiji (H)	5	0	0	5	5	27	−22	0	

Source: OFC
(H) Hosts
8 February 2016
15:00

New Caledonia	5–1	Fiji
Ludovic Boit 2', 18'; Ivann Pourouoro 35'; Mainon Kaouwi 39'; Jean Michel Poadae 40'	Report	Al-Taaf Sahib 6'

Vodafone Arena, Suva
Attendance: 1,000
Referee: Chris Sinclair (New Zealand)
8 February 2016
17:30

Vanuatu	0–5	New Zealand
	Report	Daniel Burns 22'; Mickey Malivuk 23', 32'; Jakub Sinkora 31'; Kareem Osman 35'

Vodafone Arena, Suva
Attendance: 1,000
Referee: Amitesh Behari (Fiji)
8 February 2016
20:00

Solomon Islands	3–0	Tahiti
Elliot Ragomo 3'; Jack Wetney 8'; George Stevenson 21'	Report

Vodafone Arena, Suva
Attendance: 100
Referee: Ryan Shepheard (Australia)

9 February 2016
15:00

Vanuatu	5–2	Fiji
Don Mansale 17'; Pakoa Rakom 20', 23' ? 25' (o.g.); Ricky Tuigaloa 32'	Report	Maciu Tuilau 3', 38'

Vodafone Arena, Suva
Attendance: 1,000
Referee: Rex Kamusu (Solomon Islands)
9 February 2016
17:30

New Caledonia	1–5	Solomon Islands
Christ Roland Pei 28'	Report	George Stevenson 3', 23'; Micah Lea'alafa 7'; Coleman Makau 19', 20'

Vodafone Arena, Suva
Attendance: 1,000
Referee: Antony Riley (New Zealand)
9 February 2016
20:00

New Zealand	3–2	Tahiti
Kareem Osman 5'; Stephen Ashby-Peckham 6'; Dylan Manickum 32'	Report	? 30' (o.g.); Heimana Faarahia 38'

Vodafone Arena, Suva
Attendance: 1,000
Referee: Darius Turner (Australia)

10 February 2016
15:00

New Caledonia	3–6	Vanuatu
Loic Caunes 1', 11'; Maurice Hamu 40'	Report	Don Mansale 10'; Ben Hungai 21', 26'; Ricky Tuigaloa 24', 25'; Morsen Luie 37'

Vodafone Arena, Suva
Attendance: 1,000
Referee: Phillip Mana (Solomon Islands)
10 February 2016
17:30

Solomon Islands	4–1	New Zealand
Elliot Ragomo 8', 31'; Jack Wetney 30'; Jeffrey Bule 40'	Report	Mickey Malivuk 32'

Vodafone Arena, Suva
Attendance: 1,200
Referee: Ryan Shepheard (Australia)
10 February 2016
20:00

Fiji	1–9	Tahiti
Mira Sahib 37'	Report	Tamanui Turihono 3'; Anderson Tino 16', 28'; Tane Tave 20', 35'; Teivarii Kaiha 25'; Smith Tino 36'; Heimana Faarahia 39'; Steeve Wong 40'

Vodafone Arena, Suva
Attendance: 1,000
Referee: Chris Sinclair (New Zealand)

12 February 2016
15:00

Tahiti	2–1	New Caledonia
Teivarii Kaiha 1'; Tane Tave 28'	Report	Jean Michel Poadae 27'

Vodafone Arena, Suva
Attendance: 200
Referee: Rex Kamusu (Solomon Islands)
12 February 2016
17:30

Solomon Islands	6–1	Vanuatu
Micah lea'alafa 6', 38'; Jack Wetney 7'; George Stevenson 18', 34'; James Egeta 39'	Report	Ben Hungai 11'

Vodafone Arena, Suva
Attendance: 1,200
Referee: Antony Riley (New Zealand)
12 February 2016
20:00

Fiji	1–3	New Zealand
Mira Sahib 26'	Report	Tai Barham 17'; Dylan Manickum 20'; Lucas Da Silva 33'

Vodafone Arena, Suva
Attendance: 1,200
Referee: Lui Malenarave (Vanuatu)

13 February 2016
15:00

Tahiti	5–2	Vanuatu
Manea Rateau 17', 32'; Smith Tino 18'; Anderson Tino 34', 38'	Report	Joseph Hanghangkon 3'; Pakoa Rakom 38'

Vodafone Arena, Suva
Attendance: ?
Referee: Chris Sinclair (New Zealand)
13 February 2016
17:30

Fiji	0–5	Solomon Islands
	Report	Elliot Ragomo 6'; Jack Wetney 7'; Coleman Makau 9'; Robert Laua 17', 35'

Vodafone Arena, Suva
Attendance: ?
Referee: Antony Riley (New Zealand)
13 February 2016
20:00

New Zealand	4–1	New Caledonia
Mickey Malivuk 13'; Brayden Lissington 16'; Daniel Burns 20'; James Vaughan 36'	Report	Ludovic Boit 1'

Vodafone Arena, Suva
Attendance: 1,200
Referee: Rex Kamusu (Solomon Islands)

== Winners ==
2016 OFC Futsal Championship

**Solomon Islands**
**Fifth title**

Solomon Islands qualified for the FIFA Futsal World Cup for the third consecutive time.

Team	Qualified on	Previous appearances in tournament^{1}
Solomon Islands	13 February 2016	2 (2008, 2012)

^{1} Bold indicates champion for that year. Italic indicates host for that year.

== Awards ==
The following awards were given at the conclusion of the tournament.

Award	Player
Golden Ball	(Solomon Islands) Elliot Ragomo
Golden Boot	(Solomon Islands) George Stevenson
Golden Gloves	(Solomon Islands) Anthony Talo

== Match officials ==
Referees

- (Australia) Ryan Shepheard
- (Australia) Darius Turner
- (Fiji) Amitesh Behari
- (New Zealand) Antony Riley
- (New Zealand) Chris Sinclair
- (Solomon Islands) Rex Kamusu
- (Solomon Islands) Philip Mana
- (Vanuatu) Lui Malenarave
