= Tahiti national futsal team =

Tahiti
- Shirt badge/Association crest
- Nickname(s): Aito Arii
- Association: Tahitian Football Federation
- Confederation: OFC
- Head coach: Temuri Ariitai
- Home stadium: Fautaua Sports Hall
- FIFA code: TAH
- FIFA ranking: 45 (4 April 2025)

First international
- Tuvalu 1–3 Tahiti (Suva, Fiji; 9 June 2008)

Biggest win
- Tonga 2–24 Tahiti (Païta, New Caledonia; 30 October 2019)

Biggest defeat
- Iran 16–1 Tahiti (Ashgabat, Turkmenistan; 18 September 2017)

The Tahiti national futsal team represents French Polynesia in international futsal under the auspices of the Tahitian Football Federation.

== History ==
Futsal was introduced to Tahiti in 2005 and rapidly gained popularity. The football association organized its first futsal league in 2007. The territory participated in the OFC Futsal Nations Cup for the first time in the 2008 edition of the tournament. That year, the team finished runners-up to the Solomon Islands. Tahiti repeated the performance in 2011, again finishing behind only the Solomons. The nation played its first match at home on 29 March 2013, a 3–1 friendly victory over New Zealand at the Fautaua Sports Hall.

Tahiti was invited to participate in the 2017 Asian Indoor and martial Arts Games in Turkmenistan. The team was drawn into a group with Jordan, Kyrgyzstan, and tournament favorites Iran. The team suffered a 1–16 defeat in their opening match against the latter on 18 September 2017. Tahiti was joined in the competition by fellow OFC member, Solomon Islands. The two nations became the first from Oceania to compete in the competition. The tournament also marked the first time Tahiti played outside of its own region.

== Fixtures and results ==
29 March 2013 Friendly	Tahiti	3–1	New Zealand	Papeete, French Polynesia
	Teivarii Kaiha; Utiera Pukoki; Steven Tino	Report		Stadium: Fautaua Sports Hall

31 March 2013 Friendly	Tahiti	4–2	New Zealand	Papeete, French Polynesia
		Report		Stadium: Fautaua Sports Hall

2 April 2013 Friendly	Tahiti	2–0	New Zealand	Papeete, French Polynesia
		Report		Stadium: Fautaua Sports Hall

7 February 2016 Friendly	Solomon Islands	0–12	Tahiti	Suva, Fiji
		Report		Stadium: Vodafone Arena

18 September 2017 2017 Asian Indoor and Martial Arts Games	Iran	16–1	Tahiti	Ashgabat, Turkmenistan
		Report	Jacob Tutavae 27'	Stadium: Ice Arena

19 September 2017 2017 Asian Indoor and Martial Arts Games	Kyrgyzstan	4–2	Tahiti	Ashgabat, Turkmenistan
		Report	Teivarii Kaiha 27'; Raiarii Manea 40'	Stadium: Ice Arena

21 September 2017 2017 Asian Indoor and Martial Arts Games	Jordan	3–0	Tahiti	Ashgabat, Turkmenistan
		Report		Stadium: Ice Arena

2 April 2018 Friendly	Tahiti	2–1	New Caledonia	Pīraʻe, French Polynesia
	Manutea Blumet; Tehau Barsinas	Report		Stadium: Complexe Sportif Napoléon Spitz

4 April 2018 Friendly	Tahiti	2–3	New Caledonia	Pīraʻe, French Polynesia
	Teivarii Kaiha 24'; Smith Tino (pen.)	Report		Stadium: Complexe Sportif Napoléon Spitz

6 April 2018 Friendly	Tahiti	5–2	New Caledonia	Pīraʻe, French Polynesia
	Smith Tino 4', 24'; Tane Tave; Manutea Blumet 30', 36'	Report		Stadium: Complexe Sportif Napoléon Spitz

10 December 2018 Friendly	New Caledonia	5–3	Tahiti	Nouméa, New Caledonia
		Report	Teivarii Kaiha; Antoine Tave; Olivier Hirihiri	Stadium: Indoor Sports Hall

12 December 2018 Friendly	New Caledonia	1–3	Tahiti	Nouméa, New Caledonia
		Report		Stadium: Indoor Sports Hall

14 December 2018 Friendly	New Caledonia	4–6	Tahiti	Nouméa, New Caledonia
		Report		Stadium: Indoor Sports Hall

== Tournament records ==
=== FIFA Futsal World Cup ===
FIFA Futsal World Cup
Year	Round	Position	Pld	W	D	L	GS	GA
(Netherlands) 1989	Did not enter							
(Hong Kong) 1992	Did not enter							
(Spain) 1996	Did not enter							
(Guatemala) 2000	Did not enter							
(Chinese Taipei) 2004	Did not enter							
(Brazil) 2008	Did not qualify							
(Thailand) 2012	Did not qualify							
(Colombia) 2016	Did not qualify							
(Lithuania) 2021	Did not qualify							
(Uzbekistan) 2024	Did not qualify							
Total	–	0/10	0	0	0	0	0	0

=== OFC Futsal Nations Cup ===
OFC Futsal Nations Cup
Year	Round	Position	Pld	W	D*	L	GF	GA
(Australia) 1992	Did not enter							
(Vanuatu) 1996	Did not enter							
(Vanuatu) 1999	Did not enter							
(Australia) 2004	Did not enter							
(Fiji) 2008	Runners-up	2nd	6	4	1	1	21	12
(Fiji) 2009	Did not enter							
(Fiji) 2010	Group Stage	6th	6	2	0	4	12	16
(Fiji) 2011	Runners-up	2nd	5	2	2	1	15	12
(New Zealand) 2013	Semi-finals	4th	5	2	2	1	10	9
(New Caledonia) 2014	Group Stage	4th	4	1	1	2	9	13
(Fiji) 2016	Third place	3rd	5	3	0	2	18	10
(New Caledonia) 2019	Third place	3rd	6	3	0	2	43	18
(Fiji) 2022	Did not enter							
(New Zealand) 2023	Runners-up	2nd	5	3	1	1	22	16
Total	0 titles	8/14	42	20	7	13	128	106

== See also ==
- Tahiti national football team
