= Toakai Puapua =

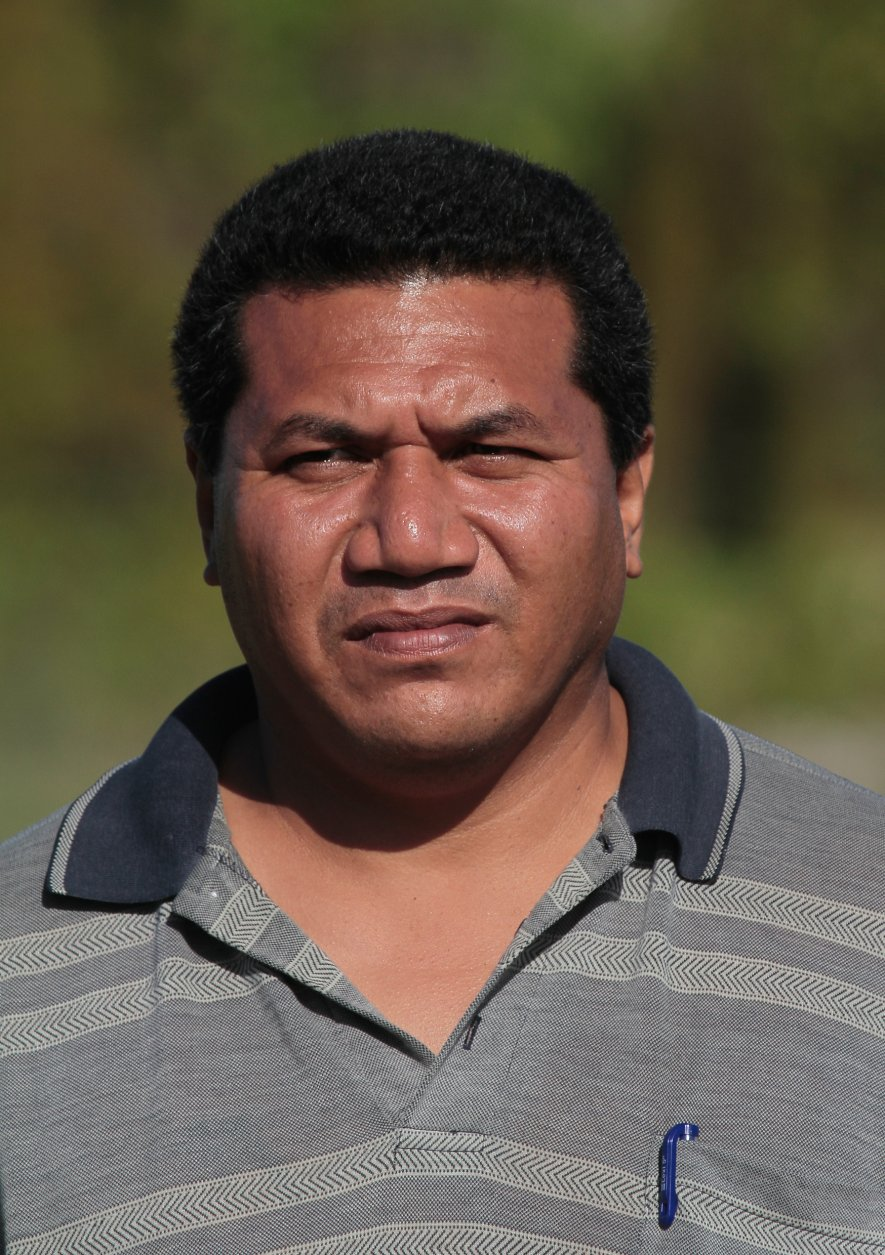
- Toakai Puapua

President of TNFA
- In office 2014–2020
- Succeeded by: Soseala Tinilau

Personal details
- Born: Tuvalu

Toakai Puapua
Managerial career
- Years: Team
- 2006–2008: Tofaga A
- 2006–2010: Tuvalu national football team

Toakai Puapua is a Tuvaluan gymnastics and football coach and the former coach of the Tuvalu national football team. From 2014 to 2020, he has been the president of the Tuvalu National Football Association (TNFA).

== Career ==
From 2006 up to 2008 he was coach of Tofaga A, Tofaga won the NBT in 2006 & 2007 and the Independence Cup in 2006.

In 2007, he was the football coach of Tuvalu during the 2007 South Pacific Games in Samoa. The first game of his tenure was a 16-0 loss to Fiji. However Tuvalu fought hard against New Caledonia (who were joint leaders of the competition) and only lost 1-0. Tuvalu then drew 1–1 with Tahiti, with a late equaliser from Viliamu Sekifu, who becoming as the first World cup scorer for his country. However the Cook Islands defeated Tuvalu 4-1. Tuvalu finished last in group A, with one point.

In 2011 Puapua was succeeded as coach by Foppe de Haan.

In 2010, Puapua was the coach of the Tuvalu national futsal team at the Oceanian Futsal Championship 2010, they finished seventh of seven teams.
