= Miro Major =

New Zealand footballer and futsal player

Personal information
- Full name: Miroslav Major
- Date of birth: 14 August 1980 (age 46)
- Place of birth: Zagreb, Croatia
- Height: 1.73 m (5 ft 8 in)
- Position: Midfielder

Team information
- Current team: Metro F.C.
- Number: 8

Senior career*
Years	Team	Apps	(Gls)
2004	Central United	24	(8)
2004–2006	Mangere United	46	(22)
2006–2007	YoungHeart Manawatu	22	(12)
2007–2008	Auckland City	20	(6)
2010–	Metro F.C.	27	(14)

International career^{‡}
2009–	New Zealand national futsal team	13	(6)
- * Club domestic league appearances and goals as of 30 November 2010 ‡ National team caps and goals as of 8:23, 5 December 2010 (UTC)

Miroslav "Miro" Major is a New Zealand footballer and futsal player, who is currently playing for Metro F.C. in the Lotto Sport Italia NRFL Premier. He is a member of the New Zealand national futsal team, which is nicknamed the Futsal Whites.

Born to Croatian parents, his father Mišo played professionally in Croatia.

== Career ==
Major had a successful spell with Central United in 2004, before joining Mangere United during the same year. He made his first appearance in the ASB Premiership with YoungHeart Manawatu in the 2005-2006 NZFC season, before transferring to Auckland City late in 2006-07 NZFC season.

== International career ==
Major made his debut for the New Zealand national futsal team in 2009.

== Club history ==
- Central United (2004)
- Mangere United (2004–2006)
- YoungHeart Manawatu (2006–2007)
- Auckland City FC (2007–2008)
- Auckland City FC (2010–present)
- Futsal Whites - New Zealand National Futsal Team (2009–present)
