= 2011 Oceanian Futsal Championship =

Tournament details
- Host country: Fiji
- Dates: 16–20 May 2011
- Teams: 8 (from 1 confederation)

Final positions
- Champions: Solomon Islands (4th title)
- Runners-up: Tahiti
- Third place: New Zealand
- Fourth place: Vanuatu

Tournament statistics
- Matches played: 18
- Goals scored: 191 (10.61 per match)
- Top scorer(s): (Solomon Islands) Elliot Ragomo (19 goals)
- Best player: (Solomon Islands) Elliot Ragomo
- Best goalkeeper: (French Polynesia) Atanui Tetihia
- Fair play award: Tuvalu

The 2011 Oceanian Futsal Championship (OFC) was the eighth edition of the main international futsal tournament of the Oceanian region. It took place from 16 May to 20 May 2011, and was hosted by Fiji, which had also hosted three previous editions.

The number of participating nations rose to eight, up from seven in 2010, as Kiribati made their first ever appearance at the OFC Futsal Championship.

The defending champions, the Solomon Islands, retained their title, defeating Tahiti by six goals to four in the final.

The tournament's Golden Ball (Player of the tournament) award went to Elliot Ragomo of the Solomon Islands, who also won Golden Boot award for the highest number of goals scored in the tournament.

The tournament also acted as a qualifying tournament for the 2012 FIFA Futsal World Cup in Thailand. The Solomon Islands won the tournament, and qualified for the World Cup.

== Championship ==
=== Group A ===
Team	Pld	W	D	L	GF	GA	GD	Pts
New Zealand	3	2	1	0	31	9	+22	7
Vanuatu	3	2	0	1	18	10	+8	6
Fiji	3	1	1	1	28	12	+16	4
Kiribati	3	0	0	3	6	52	-46	0

2011-05-16

Vanuatu	9 – 2	Kiribati
Louis Dominique 6', ?', ?'; Fenedy Masauvakalo ?', ?', ?'; Ricky Tuigaloa 11'; Don Mansale ?'; Ben Hungai ?'		Kireata Sosene ?'; Baunteraoi Kaiorake ?'

Vodafone Arena, Suva
2011-05-16

Fiji	4 – 4	New Zealand
Sandeep Nair 3'; Uraia Loki ?'; Ajesh Narayan ?'; Hussein Sahib 39'		Marvin Eakins 15', 21'; Lucas Silva ?'; Dylan Manickum ?'

Vodafone Arena, Suva

2011-05-17

Kiribati	1 – 21	New Zealand
Teemai Riinga ?'		Nathan Robertson ?', ?', ?', ?', ?'; Dylan Manickum ?', ?', ?', ?'; Jakub Sinkora ?', ?'; Miro Major ?', ?'; Micky Malivuk ?', ?'; Daniel Koprivcic ?'; Lucas Silva ?'; Marvin Eakins ?', ?', ?'; Tariq Assad ?'

Vodafone Arena, Suva
2011-05-17

Fiji	2 – 5	Vanuatu
Ajesh Narayan 9'; Sandeep Nair 37'		Louis Dominique 2'; Fenedy Masauvakalo 3'; Don Mansale 4'; Shivam Nathan 4' (o.g.); Ben Hungai ?'

Vodafone Arena, Suva

2011-05-18

Fiji	22 – 3	Kiribati
Sandeep Nair ?', ?', ?', ?', ?', ?', ?'*Kamal Hassan ?', ?', ?', ?', ?'; Hussein Sahib ?', ?', ?', ?'; Shivam Nathan ?', ?'; Uraia Loki ?'; Ratu Dugucagi ?'; Aisea Codro ?'; Ajesh Narayan ?'		Bita Keakea ?', ?', ?'

Vodafone Arena, Suva
2011-05-18

New Zealand	6 – 4	Vanuatu
Nathan Robertson 7', 25'; Jakub Sinkora 6'; Dylan Manickum ?'; Micky Malivuk ?'; Greg O’Connor 34'		Don Mansale 19', 21'; Jack Vira Ala 11'; Fredy Vava 29'

Vodafone Arena, Suva

=== Group B ===
Team	Pld	W	D	L	GF	GA	GD	Pts
Solomon Islands	3	3	0	0	30	5	+25	9
Tahiti	3	1	1	1	8	3	+5	4
New Caledonia	3	1	1	1	18	16	+2	4
Tuvalu	3	0	0	3	1	33	-32	0

2011-05-16

Tahiti	6 – 0	Tuvalu
Tahiarii Tutavae ?', ?'; Manu Faarahia ?'; Capo Turinoho ?'; Chocalat Maperi ?'; Michel Maihuri ?'

Vodafone Arena, Suva
2011-05-16

Solomon Islands	13 – 5	New Caledonia
Elliot Ragomo ?', ?', ?', ?'; Jack Wetney ?', ?'; Micah Lea’alafea ?', ?'; James Egeta ?'; Moffat Sikwa’ae ?'; Jeffery Bule ?'; Lenson Bisili ?'		Cedrick Humuni ?', ?', ?'; Romain Guitton ?'; Lenson Bisili ?' (o.g.)

Vodafone Arena, Suva

2011-05-17

Tuvalu	1 – 11	New Caledonia
Andrew Taufaiua ?'		Romain Guitton ?', ?', ?'; Anderson Paulin ?', ?'; Loic Caunes ?'; Caryl Thepinier ?'; Yvan Pourouoro ?'; Julien Drudri ?'; Cedrick Humuni ?'; Ismael Tchovanili ?'

Vodafone Arena, Suva
2011-05-17

Solomon Islands	1 – 0	Tahiti
Micah Lea’alafea 19'

Vodafone Arena, Suva

2011-05-18

New Caledonia	2 – 2	Tahiti
Chocalat Maperi 6'; Capo Turinoho 35'		Caryl Thepinier 14'; Julien Drudri 37'

Vodafone Arena, Suva
2011-05-18

Tuvalu	0 – 16	Solomon Islands
		Elliot Ragomo ?', ?', ?', 36', 37', 38', 39'; James Egeta ?', ?'; Samuel Osifelo ?', ?'; Coleman Makau ?', ?'; Micah Lea’alafa ?'; Moffat Sikwa’ae ?'; Jack Wetney ?'

Vodafone Arena, Suva

=== 7th place match ===
2011-05-19

Tuvalu	2 – 3	Kiribati
Matti Uaelesi 17'; Meauma Petaia 38'		Bita Keakea 14', 27'; Borau Tabara 17'

Vodafone Arena, Suva

=== 5th place match ===
2011-05-19

New Caledonia	6 – 8	Fiji
Ismael Tchovanili ?', ?', ?'; Romain Guitton ?', ?'; Louis Waishitine ?'		Ratu Dugucagi 3', ?', ?', ?'; Eran Underwood ?', ?'; Kamal Hassan ?'; Hussein Sahib ?'.

Vodafone Arena, Suva

=== Semi-finals ===
2011-05-19

New Zealand	3 – 3 (a.e.t.)	Tahiti
Daniel Koprivcic 25'; Nathan Robertson 29'; Marvin Eakins 44'		Gaby Kavera 9', 35'; Michel Maihuri 23'
Penalties
Dylan Manickum (penalty missed); Daniel Koprivcic (penalty missed)	3 – 4

Vodafone Arena, Suva
2011-05-19

Solomon Islands	13 – 1	Vanuatu
Micah Lea’alafa ?', ?', ?', ?'; Elliot Ragomo ?', ?', ?'; Moffat Sikwa’ae ?', ?'; Coleman Makau ?', ?'; Jack Wetney ?'; Ricky Tuigaloa ?' (o.g.)		Fredy Vava ?'

Vodafone Arena, Suva

=== Third place play-off ===
2011-05-20

New Zealand	1 – 1 (a.e.t.)	Vanuatu
Micky Malivuk 24'		Lui Sifaes 39'
Penalties
	5 – 4

Vodafone Arena, Suva

=== Final ===
2011-05-20

Tahiti	4 – 6	Solomon Islands
Gaby Kavera 5'; Areti Williams ?'; Teva Durot ?'; Mana Faarahia 23'		Elliot Ragomo 10', 27', 27', 38'; Jack Wetney 24', 26'

Vodafone Arena, Suva

Oceanian Futsal Championship
2011 Winners
Solomon Islands
4th Title

== Awards ==
The following awards were given at the conclusion of the tournament.

Award	Player
Golden Ball	(Solomon Islands) Elliot Ragomo
Golden Boot	(Solomon Islands) Elliot Ragomo
Golden Gloves	(French Polynesia) Atanui Tetihia
Fair Play Award	Tuvalu

== Goalscorers ==
There were 191 goals scored in 18 matches, for an average of 10.6 goals per match.

19 goals

- (Solomon Islands) Elliot Ragomo

8 goals

- (Fiji) Sandeep Nair
- (Solomon Islands) Micah Lea’alafa
- (New Zealand) Nathan Robertson

7 goals

- (New Zealand) Marvin Eakins
