= OFC Futsal Nations Cup =

- Organiser(s): OFC
- Founded: 1992
- Region: Oceania
- Teams: 8
- Current champions: Solomon Islands (7th title)
- Most championships: Solomon Islands (7 titles)
- 2025 OFC Futsal Nations Cup

The OFC Futsal Championship is the main national futsal competition of the Oceania Football Confederation (OFC) nations. It was first held in 1992.

The competition was initially held every four years. From 2008 onwards, however, it became an annual tournament.

Australia won every edition of the competition until it left the Oceania Football Confederation in 2006. Solomon Islands have won the three editions of the tournament which have taken place since then - including a decisive 8-1 victory over Fiji in the final of the 2009 edition. It is a qualification for the FIFA Futsal World Cup.

The original name was the OFC Futsal Championship, from 2019, the tournament will be known as the OFC Futsal Nations Cup.

== Summaries ==
Ed.	Year	Hosts	(gold) Winners	Score	(silver) Runners-up	(bronze) Third place	Score	Fourth place
1	1992	Australia	Australia	– (Note: Group stage, defined on points earned.)	Vanuatu	New Zealand	—N/a	
2	1996	Vanuatu	Australia	–	Vanuatu	Fiji	–	Western Samoa
3	1999	Vanuatu	Australia	–	Fiji	Vanuatu	–	Papua New Guinea
4	2004	Australia	Australia	–	New Zealand	Vanuatu	–	Fiji
5	2008	Fiji	Solomon Islands	–	Tahiti	Vanuatu	–	New Zealand
6	2009	Fiji	Solomon Islands	8–1	Fiji	Vanuatu	6–2	New Caledonia
7	2010	Fiji	Solomon Islands	–	Fiji	New Zealand	–	Vanuatu
8	2011	Fiji	Solomon Islands	6–4	Tahiti	New Zealand	1–1 (5–4 p)	Vanuatu
9	2013	New Zealand	Australia	5–1	Malaysia	New Zealand	1–0	Tahiti
10	2014	New Caledonia	Malaysia	–	New Caledonia	New Zealand	–	Tahiti
11	2016	Fiji	Solomon Islands	–	New Zealand	Tahiti	–	Vanuatu
12	2019	New Caledonia	Solomon Islands	5–5 (2–1 p)	New Zealand	Tahiti	5–5 (3–1 p)	New Caledonia
13	2022	Fiji	New Zealand	6–2	Solomon Islands	New Caledonia	5–3	FFA President's Five
14	2023	New Zealand	New Zealand	5–0	Tahiti	Solomon Islands	5–3	Fiji
15	2025	Fiji	Solomon Islands	–	New Zealand	Fiji	–	Vanuatu

As OFC Futsal Cup

== Performance by nations ==
Team	Titles	Runners-up	Third place	Fourth place
Solomon Islands	7 (2008, 2009, 2010, 2011, 2016, 2019, 2025)	1 (2022)	1 (2023)	
Australia	5 (1992*, 1996, 1999, 2004*, 2013)			
New Zealand	2 (2022, 2023*)	4 (2004, 2016, 2019, 2025)	5 (1992, 2010, 2011, 2013*, 2014)	1 (2008)
Malaysia	1 (2014)	1 (2013)		
Tahiti		3 (2008, 2011, 2023)	2 (2016, 2019)	2 (2013, 2014)
Fiji		3 (1999, 2009*, 2010*)	2 (1996, 2025*)	2 (2004, 2023)
Vanuatu		2 (1992, 1996*)	4 (1999*, 2004, 2008, 2009)	4 (2010, 2011, 2016, 2025)
New Caledonia		1 (2014*)	1 (2022)	2 (2009, 2019*)
FFA President's Five				1 (2022)
Papua New Guinea				1 (1999)
Samoa				1 (1996)

* = hosts

== Medal summary ==
Rank	Nation	Gold	Silver	Bronze	Total
1	Solomon Islands	7	1	1	9
2	Australia	5	0	0	5
3	New Zealand	2	4	5	11
4	Malaysia	1	1	0	2
5	Fiji	0	3	2	5
5	Tahiti	0	3	2	5
7	Vanuatu	0	2	4	6
8	New Caledonia	0	1	1	2
Totals (8 entries)		15	15	15	45

== All-time table ==
Manually added 2025 data. Old source:

Rank	Team	Part	P	W	D	L	GF	GA	GD	Points
1	New Zealand	13	65	40	5	20	286	185	+101	125
2	Solomon Islands	11	53	40	4	9	336	152	+184	124
3	Vanuatu	15	73	32	6	35	281	276	+5	102
4	Fiji	12	61	28	4	29	251	242	+9	88
5	Australia	5	26	26	0	0	182	20	+162	78
6	Tahiti	8	41	18	7	16	151	106	+45	61
7	New Caledonia	10	48	16	5	27	195	210	–15	53
8	Malaysia	2	9	6	1	2	44	27	+17	19
9	Papua New Guinea	1	6	3	1	2	23	16	+7	10
10	Samoa	5	23	3	0	20	48	166	–118	9
11	American Samoa	1	5	1	0	4	8	34	–26	3
12	Kiribati	1	4	1	0	3	9	54	–45	3
13	Cook Islands	1	6	0	0	6	6	27	–21	0
14	Tonga	1	5	0	0	5	6	52	–46	0
15	Tuvalu	4	20	0	0	20	21	166	–145	0

== Participating nations ==
Legend

- 1st — Champions
- 2nd — Runners-up
- 3rd — Third place
- 4th — Fourth place
- SF — Semifinals
- 5th-8th — Fifth to Eighth place
- QF — Quarterfinals
- GS — Group stage
- R2 — Round 2
- R1 — Round 1
- q — Qualified for upcoming tournament
- • — Did not qualify
- × – Did not enter
- × – Withdrew / Banned / Entry not accepted by FIFA
- – To be determined
- — Hosts
- – Not an OFC member

Team	(Australia) 1992	(Vanuatu) 1996	(Vanuatu) 1999	(Australia) 2004	(Fiji) 2008	(Fiji) 2009	(Fiji) 2010	(Fiji) 2011	(New Zealand) 2013	(New Caledonia) 2014	(Fiji) 2016	(New Caledonia) 2019	(Fiji) 2022	(New Zealand) 2023	(Fiji) 2025	Years
American Samoa	×	×	×	×	×	×	×	×	×	×	×	GS	×	×	×	1
Australia	1st	1st	1st	1st	Part of AFC				1st	Part of AFC						5
Cook Islands	×	×	7th	×	×	×	×	×	×	×	×	×	×	×	×	1
Fiji	×	3rd	2nd	4th	5th	2nd	2nd	GS	×	×	6th	GS	GS	4th	3rd	12
FFA President's Five	—N/a												4th	—N/a		1
Kiribati	Not an OFC member				×	×	×	GS	×	×	×	×	×	×	×	1
Malaysia	Part of AFC								2nd	1st	Part of AFC					2
New Caledonia	×	×	×	×	6th	4th	5th	GS	GS	2nd	5th	4th	3rd	GS	×	10
New Zealand	3rd	×	5th	2nd	4th	×	3rd	3rd	3rd	3rd	2nd	2nd	1st	1st	2nd	13
Papua New Guinea	×	×	4th	×	×	×	×	×	×	×	×	×	×	×	×	1
Samoa	×	4th	6th	6th	×	×	×	×	×	×	×	×	GS	GS	×	5
Solomon Islands	×	×	×	5th	1st	1st	1st	1st	GS	×	1st	1st	2nd	3rd	1st	11
Tahiti	×	×	×	×	2nd	×	6th	2nd	4th	4th	3rd	3rd	×	2nd	×	8
Tonga	×	×	×	×	×	×	×	×	×	×	×	GS	GS	GS	×	3
Tuvalu	Not an OFC member				7th	×	7th	GS	×	×	×	×	×	×	5th	4
Vanuatu	2nd	2nd	3rd	3rd	3rd	3rd	4th	4th	GS	5th	4th	GS	GS	GS	4th	15

== FIFA Futsal World Cup Qualifiers ==
Legend

- 1st – Champions
- 2nd – Runners-up
- 3rd – Third place
- 4th – Fourth place
- QF – Quarterfinals
- R2 – Round 2 (1989–2008, second group stage, top 8; 2012–present: knockout round of 16)
- R1 – Round 1
- – Hosts
- – Not an OFC member
- Q – Qualified for upcoming tournament

Team	(Netherlands) 1989	(Hong Kong) 1992	(Spain) 1996	(Guatemala) 2000	(Chinese Taipei) 2004	(Brazil) 2008	(Thailand) 2012	(Colombia) 2016	(Lithuania) 2021	(Uzbekistan) 2024	2028	Total
Australia	GS	GS	GS	GS	GS							5
New Zealand										GS		1
Solomon Islands						GS	GS	GS	GS			4

== Historical goalscorers ==
Legend

- Total – total goals at OFC Nations Cup
- Top 7 – Goals against top 7 nations AUS, FIJ, NCL, NZL, SOL, TAH, VAN + Malaysia
- TOP 3 – Goals against top 7 nations AUS, NZL, SOL + Malaysia

Rank	Player	Total	Player	Top 7	Player	Top 3
1	(Solomon Islands) Elliot Ragomo	58	(Solomon Islands) Micah Lea'alafa	45	(Vanuatu) Ben Hungai	11
2	(Solomon Islands) Micah Lea'alafa	57	(Solomon Islands) Elliot Ragomo	38	(New Caledonia) Cedrick Humuni	8
3	(Solomon Islands) Jack Wetney	32	(Solomon Islands) Jack Wetney	27	(New Zealand) Dylan Manickum	7
4	(Fiji) Kamal Hassan	31	(New Zealand) Micky Malivuk	20	(Solomon Islands) Micah Lea'alafa	7
5	(New Zealand) Dylan Manickum	28	(New Zealand) Dylan Manickum	19	(New Zealand) Micky Malivuk	6
6	(New Zealand) Micky Malivuk	25	(Vanuatu) Ben Hungai	17	(Fiji) Kamal Hassan	6
7	(Vanuatu) Ben Hungai	21	(Fiji) Kamal Hassan	15	(Solomon Islands) Elliot Ragomo	6
8	(New Caledonia) Cedrick Humuni	20	(Vanuatu) Jack Vira Ala	13		
9	(New Zealand) Nathan Robertson	17	(New Caledonia) Cedrick Humuni	13		
10	(Vanuatu) Jack Vira Ala	16	(Solomon Islands) George Stevenson	13		

== Team nicknames ==
Team	Nickname
Australia	Futsalroos
Cook Islands	Young Cooks
Fiji	Bula Boys
New Caledonia	Les Cagous
New Zealand	Futsal Whites
Papua New Guinea	Kapuls (Cuscus)
Samoa	Manumea Samoa
Solomon Islands	Kurukuru
Tahiti	Aito Arii
Tonga	
Vanuatu	The Gideons

== See also ==
- OFC Futsal Champions League
