= New Caledonia national futsal team =

New Caledonia
- Nickname(s): Les Cagous (The Kagus)
- Association: Fédération Calédonienne de Football
- Confederation: Oceania Football Confederation (Oceania)
- FIFA code: NCL
- FIFA ranking: 68 ▼1 (12 December 2025)
Home colours	Away colours

First international
- Fiji 4–2 New Caledonia (Suva, Fiji, 8 June 2008)

Biggest win
- New Caledonia 10–2 Tuvalu (Suva, Fiji, 12 June 2008); Tuvalu 1–11 New Caledonia (Suva, Fiji, 17 May 2011)

Biggest defeat
- Vanuatu 11–1 New Caledonia (Suva, Fiji, 10 June 2008)

FIFA World Cup
- Appearances: 0

OFC Futsal Championship
- Appearances: 7 (First in 2008)
- Best result: Runners–up (2014)

The New Caledonia national futsal team is the representative team for New Caledonia in international futsal competitions. It is controlled by the Fédération Calédonienne de Football.

== Tournament records ==
=== FIFA Futsal World Cup record ===
FIFA World Cup Record
Year	Round	Pld	W	D	L	GS	GA
Netherlands 1989	Did not enter	-	-	-	-	-	-
Hong Kong 1992	Did not enter	-	-	-	-	-	-
Spain 1996	Did not enter	-	-	-	-	-	-
Guatemala 2000	Did not enter	-	-	-	-	-	-
Taiwan 2004	Did not enter	-	-	-	-	-	-
Brazil 2008	Did not qualify	-	-	-	-	-	-
Thailand 2012	Did not qualify	-	-	-	-	-	-
Colombia 2016	Did not qualify	-	-	-	-	-	-
Lithuania 2020	Did not qualify	-	-	-	-	-	-
Uzbekistan 2024	Did not qualify						
Total	0/10	-	-	-	-	-	-

=== Oceanian Futsal Championship record ===
Oceanian Futsal Championship Record
Year	Round	Pld	W	D	L	GS	GA
Australia 1992	Did not enter	-	-	-	-	-	-
Vanuatu 1996	Did not enter	-	-	-	-	-	-
Vanuatu 1999	Did not enter	-	-	-	-	-	-
Australia 2004	Did not enter	-	-	-	-	-	-
Fiji 2008	6th place	6	1	1	4	22	30
Fiji 2009	4th place	4	1	0	3	11	21
Fiji 2010	5th place	6	2	0	4	25	29
Fiji 2011	6th place	4	1	1	2	24	24
New Zealand 2013	8th place	4	0	0	4	11	26
New Caledonia 2014	2nd place	4	2	1	1	15	13
Fiji 2016	5th place	5	1	0	4	11	18
Total	7/11	33	8	3	22	119	161
