= Solomon Islands national futsal team =

Solomon Islands
- Nickname(s): Kurukuru
- Association: Solomon Islands Football Federation
- Confederation: OFC
- Head coach: (England) Damon Shaw
- Captain: Elliot Ragomo
- Home stadium: Friendship Hall, Honiara
- FIFA code: SOL
- FIFA ranking: 57 (24 September 2026)
Home colours	Away colours

First international
- Australia 9–0 Solomon Islands (Canberra, Australia, 25 July 2004)

Biggest win
- Solomon Islands 21–2 Tuvalu (Suva, Fiji, 14 August 2010)

Biggest defeat
- Russia 31–2 Solomon Islands (Brasília, Brazil, 6 October 2008)

FIFA World Cup
- Appearances: 4 (First in 2008)
- Best result: Group stage (2008, 2012, 2016, 2021)

OFC Futsal Championship
- Appearances: 7 (First in 2004)
- Best result: Champions (2008, 2009, 2010, 2011, 2016, 2019)

Confederations Cup
- Appearances: 1 (First in 2009)
- Best result: 5th place (2009)

The Solomon Islands national futsal team, nicknamed Kurukuru, represents the Solomon Islands in international futsal competitions and is controlled by the Solomon Islands Football Federation. It is one of the strongest teams in Oceania, but fares poorly in competitions outside the region.

The team's coach in 2008 was Victor Wai’ia. By 2009, he had been succeeded by Dickson Kadau. The country has no futsal stadium, although in July 2009 Prime Minister Derek Sikua promised that the government would assist in building one.

On 6 October 2008, the Solomon Islands established a record for the worst defeat in the history of the FIFA Futsal World Cup in Brazil 2008, when they were beaten by Russia thirty-one goals to two. It was the country's first participation in the World Cup; it finished last in Group A, with four games lost out of four, 6 goals for and 69 against. At the 2012 FIFA Futsal World Cup in Thailand, the Kurukuru once again finished last in their group, suffering heavy defeats to Russia and Colombia, but did manage to obtain their first World Cup win, beating Guatemala 4–3.

On a regional level, however, the Kurukuru won the 2008 Oceanian Futsal Championship, and successfully defended their title in 2009, beating Fiji 8–1 in the final, and then again in 2010 and 2011. After failing to win in 2013 and not competing in 2014, they would win their record-tying fifth OFC Futsal Championship in 2016. They are, therefore, the current regional champions.

The Solomon Islands national futsal team currently holds the world record for the fastest ever goal scored in an official futsal match. It was set by Kurukuru captain Elliot Ragomo, who scored against New Caledonia three seconds into the game in July 2009.

== Results and fixtures ==
The following is a list of match results in the last 12 months, as well as any future matches that have been scheduled.

Legend

Win Draw Loss Fixture

== Team ==
=== Current squad ===
The following players were called up to the squad for the 2023 OFC Futsal Nations Cup.

No.	Pos.	Player	Date of birth (age)	Caps	Club
1	GK	Lordrick Afia	8 July 2003 (age 23)		(Solomon Islands) Mataks FC
12	GK	Cliff Sasau	28 August 1976 (age 50)		(Solomon Islands) Haura FC
2	DF	Calvin Do'oro	24 January 2001 (age 25)		(Solomon Islands) Dawn FC
3	DF	Elliot Ragomo (captain)	28 May 1990 (age 36)		(Brazil) Minas Tenis Clube
4	DF	Clifford Misitana			(Solomon Islands) Mataks FC
5	DF	Marlon Sia	19 July 1999 (age 27)		(Solomon Islands) Mataks FC
14	DF	Jayroll Patty			(Solomon Islands) Wechon FC
6	FW	Charlie Otainao	5 June 1992 (age 34)		(Solomon Islands) Dawn FC
7	FW	Junior Mana	4 December 2001 (age 24)		(Solomon Islands) Mataks FC
8	FW	Eddie Kasute'e			(Solomon Islands) Dawn FC
9	FW	George Stevenson	7 January 1992 (age 34)		(Solomon Islands) Futsal G-Camp
10	FW	Micah Lea'alafa	1 June 1991 (age 35)		(Australia) FK Beograd
11	FW	Owen Bunabo			(Solomon Islands) The Saints
13	FW	Elis Mana	9 March 2000 (age 26)		(Solomon Islands) Mataks FC

== Competitive record ==
=== FIFA Futsal World Cup ===
FIFA Futsal World Cup record
Year	Round	Position	Pld	W	D	L	GS	GA	
(Netherlands) 1989	Did not enter								
(Hong Kong) 1992	Did not enter								
(Spain) 1996	Did not enter								
(Guatemala) 2000	Did not enter								
(Taiwan) 2004	Did not qualify								
(Brazil) 2008	Group Stage	20th	4	0	0	4	6	69	
(Thailand) 2012	Group Stage	21st	3	1	0	2	7	30	
(Colombia) 2016	Group Stage	24th	3	0	0	3	5	21	
(Lithuania) 2021	Group Stage	23rd	3	0	0	3	4	22	
(Uzbekistan) 2024	Did not qualify								
Total:4/10	Group Stage	20th		13	1	0	12	22	142

=== OFC Futsal Nations Cup ===
OFC Futsal Nations Cup record
Year	Round	Position	Pld	W	D	L	GS	GA
(Australia) 1992	Did not enter							
(Vanuatu) 1996	Did not enter							
(Vanuatu) 1999	Did not enter							
(Australia) 2004	Fifth place	5th	5	1	0	4	12	31
(Fiji) 2008	Champions	1st	6	5	0	1	41	19
(Fiji) 2009	Champions	1st	4	4	0	0	32	7
(Fiji) 2010	Champions	1st	6	6	0	0	59	16
(Fiji) 2011	Champions	1st	5	5	0	0	49	10
(New Zealand) 2013	Group stage		3	1	0	2	11	15
(New Caledonia) 2014	Did not enter							
(Fiji) 2016	Champions	1st	5	5	0	0	23	3
(New Caledonia) 2019	Champions	1st	5	5	0	0	34	11
(Fiji) 2022	Runners-up	2nd	5	3	1	1	33	20
(New Zealand) 2023	Third place	3rd	5	2	2	1	27	16
Total	6 titles		49	37	3	9	321	148

=== Confederations Cup ===
Futsal Confederations Cup record
Year	Round	Pld	W	D	L	GS	GA
Libya 2009	5th place	4	0	1	3	12	29
Brazil 2013	Did not enter						
Kuwait 2014	Did not enter						
Thailand 2022	Did not enter						
Total	1/4	4	0	1	3	12	29
