= Ramzan Khan =

Indian singer, social worker, and cow caretaker

- Other name: Munna Master
- Citizenship: India
- Education: Shastri Degree
- Occupations: Indian singer, social worker, cow caretaker
- Known for: Singing Bhajans, cow care, Padma Shri award
- Notable work: Shri Shyam Surabhi Vandana
- Children: Feroze Khan (son)
- Awards: Padma Shri (2020)

Ramzan Khan, popularly known as Munna Master, is an Indian singer and social worker from Jaipur district of Rajasthan, known for singing Bhajans (devotional songs) and dedicated cow care. He was awarded the Padma Shri, India's fourth-highest civilian award, in 2020 for his contributions to the arts.

== Life and career ==
Ramzan Khan earned a Shastri degree in Sanskrit language. He is known for his devotion to cows and his singing of Krishna Bhajans. His dedication came to national attention during the controversy surrounding his son, Feroze Khan's appointment as an assistant professor at Banaras Hindu University's Sanskrit Vidya Dharma Vigyan Department in November 2019. The controversy highlighted the diverse religious background of a scholar teaching Sanskrit. He is dedicated to cow protection and care, and spends a lot of his time in this social work. He has authored the book, Shri Shyam Surabhi Vandana, a devotional work.

== Awards and recognition ==
- Padma Shri, 2020

== See also ==
- List of Padma Shri award recipients (2020-2029)
