= James Egeta =

Solomon Islands footballer (born 1990)

James Egeta (born 10 August 1990) is a Solomon Islands footballer who plays as a midfielder.

== Early life ==
Egeta started playing futsal as a child. He was introduced to the sport at school.

== Career ==
Egeta has been described as a "role model to many young players in the Solomon Islands and the region". He has been regarded as one of the Solomon Islands national futsal team's most important players and has played in three FIFA Futsal World Cups. He returned to the Solomon Islands national futsal team in 2023 after a few years away.

== Personal life ==
Egeta was born in 1990 in the Solomon Islands. He has regarded Brazil international Falcão as his futsal idol.
