= Vanuatu national futsal team =

Vanuatu
- Nickname(s): Gideons
- Association: Vanuatu Football Federation
- Confederation: OFC (Oceania)
- Head coach: Tito Quai
- Asst coach: Terry Malapa
- Captain: Michel Coulon
- Most caps: Ben Hungai (26)
- Top scorer: Ben Hungai (16)
- FIFA code: VAN
- FIFA ranking: 80 ▼6 (12 December 2025)
Home colours	Away colours

First international
- Australia 8–1 Vanuatu (Brisbane, Australia; 15 June 1992)

Biggest win
- Vanuatu 11–1 New Caledonia (Suva, Fiji; 10 June 2008)

Biggest defeat
- Solomon Islands 13–1 Vanuatu (Suva, Fiji; 19 May 2011)

FIFA World Cup
- Appearances: 0

OFC Futsal Championship
- Appearances: 13 (First in 1992)
- Best result: 2nd place (1992, 1996)

The Vanuatu national futsal team is controlled by the Vanuatu Football Federation, the governing body for futsal in Vanuatu and represents the country in international futsal competitions, such as the World Cup and the Oceanian Futsal Championship. They are known as the "Vanuatu Futsal Gideons"

== Tournament records ==
=== FIFA Futsal World Cup record ===
FIFA World Cup Record
Year	Round	Pld	W	D	L	GS	GA
Hong Kong 1992	Did not qualify	-	-	-	-	-	-
Spain 1996	Did not qualify	-	-	-	-	-	-
Guatemala 2000	Did not qualify	-	-	-	-	-	-
Taiwan 2004	Did not qualify	-	-	-	-	-	-
Brazil 2008	Did not qualify	-	-	-	-	-	-
Thailand 2012	Did not qualify	-	-	-	-	-	-
Colombia 2016	Did not qualify	-	-	-	-	-	-
Lithuania 2021	Did not qualify	-	-	-	-	-	-
Uzbekistan 2024	Did not qualify	-	-	-	-	-	-
Total	0/10	-	-	-	-	-	-

=== Oceanian Futsal Championship record ===
Oceanian Futsal Championship Record
Year	Round	Pld	W	D	L	GS	GA
Australia 1992	2nd place	4	2	0	2	10	27
Vanuatu 1996	2nd place	6	3	1	2	26	21
Vanuatu 1999	3rd place	6	3	2	1	22	14
Australia 2004	3rd place	5	3	0	2	21	11
Fiji 2008	3rd place	6	4	0	2	29	8
Fiji 2009	3rd place	4	1	0	3	11	20
Fiji 2010	4th place	6	3	0	3	21	22
Fiji 2011	4th place	5	2	1	2	20	24
New Zealand 2013	6th place	4	1	0	3	16	26
New Caledonia 2014	5th place	4	1	0	3	12	20
Fiji 2016	4th place	5	2	0	3	14	21
Fiji 2022|5th place	4	2	1	1	16	7	
Fiji 2023|2nd place	4	1	1	2	12	12	
New Zealand 2023|6th place	5	2	0	3	33	17	
Fiji 2025|4th place	4	1	1	2	9	11	
Total	11/11	71	30	7	34	275	257

== Current squad ==
No.	Pos.	Player	Date of birth (age)	Caps	Goals	Club
21	GK	Antonio Norman	20 April 1999 (age 26)	15	0	(Vanuatu Football Federation) Greenstone F.C
12	GK	Charlie Boe	23 September 1997 (age 28)	4	0	(Vanuatu Football Federation) Manaro F.C
2	DF	Michel Coulon	3 December 1995 (age 30)	17	5	(Vanuatu Football Federation) Huka F.C
3	DF	Athanas Alick	23 July 2001 (age 24)	8	0	(Vanuatu Football Federation) Real Seaside F.C
4	DF	Kerol Alex	10 November 2001 (age 24)	8	0	(Vanuatu Football Federation) Huka F.C
13	DF	Steve Nona	1 October 2004 (age 21)	9	3	(Vanuatu Football Federation) Ascension F.C
14	DF	Vano Charlie	23 September 1999 (age 26)	7	1	(Vanuatu Football Federation) T United F.C
6	MF	Paul Peterson Takaro	6 April 2007 (age 18)	4	4	(Vanuatu Football Federation) Lugan F.C
7	MF	Kemly Lehi	20 January 2004 (age 22)	17	10	(Vanuatu Football Federation) Southern Legions F.C
8	MF	Sandy Mesau	15 June 1997 (age 28)	20	10	(Vanuatu Football Federation) Huka F.C
9	MF	Keshly Joseph	7 August 1999 (age 26)	9	5	(Vanuatu Football Federation) Southern Legions F.C
5	FW	Kevin Donald	20 January 1998 (age 28)	20	10	(Vanuatu Football Federation) Greenstone F.C
10	FW	Justine Alick	20 January 1998 (age 28)	4	1	(Vanuatu Football Federation) T United F.C
11	FW	Andrew Vuti	11 February 2004 (age 21)	4	0	(Vanuatu Football Federation) Ascension F.C
1	GK	Anthony Quai	19 May 1995 (age 30)	16	0	(Vanuatu Football Federation) Huka F.C
15	MF	Jayson Timatua	27 December 1998 (age 27)	5	5	(Vanuatu Football Federation) UNV F.C
