= Charlie Otainao =

Solomon Islands footballer

Personal information
- Date of birth: 5 June 1992 (age 34)
- Place of birth: Solomon Islands
- Position: Midfielder

Team information
- Current team: Central Coast

Senior career*
Years	Team	Apps	(Gls)
2014–2016	Western United		
2016–2018	Kossa		
2018	Rewa	0	(0)
2020–	Central Coast		

International career^{‡}
2016	Solomon Islands	3	(0)
- Solomon Islands futsal
- * Club domestic league appearances and goals as of 1 January 2021 ‡ National team caps and goals as of 24 July 2025

Charlie Otainao (born 5 June 1992) is a Solomon Islander footballer who plays as a midfielder. He spent his career in the Solomon Islands S-League except for a stint in Fijian Club Rewa F.C. in 2018.
