= 2008 Oceanian Futsal Championship =

Tournament details
- Host country: Fiji
- Dates: 8–14 June 2008
- Teams: 7 (from 1 confederation)
- Venue: 1 (in 1 host city)

Final positions
- Champions: Solomon Islands (1st title)
- Runners-up: Tahiti
- Third place: Vanuatu
- Fourth place: New Zealand

Tournament statistics
- Matches played: 21
- Goals scored: 163 (7.76 per match)
- All statistics correct as of 28 August 2008.

The 2008 OFC Futsal Championship was the fifth edition of the main international futsal tournament of the Oceanian region. It took place in Suva, Fiji from 8 June to 14 June 2008.

The tournament also acted as a qualifying tournament for the 2008 FIFA Futsal World Cup in Brazil. The Solomon Islands won the tournament, and qualified for the World Cup.

This was the first OFC Futsal Championship tournament not to include Australia as they left the OFC to join the Asian Football Confederation in 2006.

== Venue ==
There was a security incident at the Vodafone Arena in Suva. during the first day of the tournament, when thieves has broken into cars of visitors.

== Championship ==
The seven participating teams played each on a single round-robin format. The top team of the group, the Solomon Islands, won the championship and got a ticket to 2008 Futsal World Cup in Brazil.

| Teams | GP | W | D | L | GF | GA | GD | Pts |
|---|---|---|---|---|---|---|---|---|
| Solomon Islands | 6 | 5 | 0 | 1 | 41 | 19 | +22 | 15 |
| Tahiti | 6 | 4 | 1 | 1 | 21 | 12 | +9 | 13 |
| Vanuatu | 6 | 4 | 0 | 2 | 29 | 8 | +21 | 12 |
| New Zealand | 6 | 3 | 0 | 3 | 22 | 16 | +6 | 9 |
| Fiji | 6 | 3 | 0 | 3 | 31 | 31 | 0 | 9 |
| New Caledonia | 6 | 1 | 1 | 4 | 22 | 30 | -8 | 4 |
| Tuvalu | 6 | 0 | 0 | 6 | 7 | 57 | -50 | 0 |

=== Day 1 ===
2008-06-08

| Solomon Islands | 5–1 | New Zealand |
|---|---|---|
| Elliot Ragamo ?', ?'; Micah Lea'alafa ?'; Moffat Sikwa'ae ?'; Jenan Kapu ?' | | Gregory O'Connor ?' |

2008-06-08

| Tuvalu | 0–6 | Vanuatu |
|---|---|---|
| | | Jack Vira Ala 2', 21', ?'; Ben Edward ?'; Derek Malas ?' |

2008-06-08

| Fiji | 4–2 | New Caledonia |
|---|---|---|
| Kamal Hassan 39', 39'; Sandeep Nair ?'; Siga Ali ?' | | Alexandre Rosso ?'; Albert Hnailolo ?' |

Attendance: 1000

==== Day 2 ====
2008-06-09

| New Zealand | 2–1 | Vanuatu |
|---|---|---|
| Andrew Gwilliam ?'; Greg O’Connor 39' | | Ben Edward 35' |

Attendance: 1000
Referee: Scott Kidson (Australia)
2008-06-09

| Solomon Islands | 8–5 | New Caledonia |
|---|---|---|
| Elliot Ragamo 19', 37'; Micah Lea'alafa 39', 39'; Francis Lafai ?'; Moffat Sikwa'ae 19'; Jenan Kapu 23'; Jack Wetney 25' | | Yvan Pourouoro 39', 39'; Alexandre Rosso ?'; Edouard Murraccioli ?'; Marcias Gino Rene 32' |

Attendance: 1000
Referee: Allan Alick (Vanuatu)
2008-06-09

| Tuvalu | 1–3 | Tahiti |
|---|---|---|
| Imo Fiamalua 11' | | Michael Maihuri 14', 17'; Steeven Tino 39' |

==== Day 3 ====
2008-06-10

| Vanuatu | 11–1 | New Caledonia |
|---|---|---|
| Jack Vira Ala 19', 28', ?', 37'; Derek Malas 1', 22'; Siardon Mera Talkanamal 5', 29'; Louis Dominique 10', 12'; Lui Sifas 36' | Report | Yvan Pourouoro 15' |

2008-06-10

| New Zealand | 2–3 | Tahiti |
|---|---|---|
| Joshua Martin 1'; Marvin Eakin ?' | Report | Michel Maihuri 39', 40'; Romeo Patira 1' |

Referee: Allan Alick (Vanuatu)
2008-06-10

| Solomon Islands | 11–6 | Fiji |
|---|---|---|
| Micah Lea'alafa 3', 20', 27', 40'; Elliot Ragamo 20', 27'; James Egata 4', 34'; Francis Lafai 13'; Jenan Kapu 36'; Jack Wetney 32' | Report | Kamal Hassan 12', 16', 20'; Mira Sahib 5', 36'; Alvin Avinesh 34' |

Referee: Chris Colley (Australia)

==== Day 4 ====
2008-06-11

| New Caledonia | 2–2 | Tahiti |
|---|---|---|
| Yvan Pourouoro 2'; Jerry Iaruel 23' | Report | Steeven Tino 29'; Jimmy Riaria 35' |

Referee: Chris Colley (Australia)
2008-06-11

| Vanuatu | 5–2 | Fiji |
|---|---|---|
| Jack Vira Ala 2', 26'; Derek Malas 12', 32'; Louis Dominique 26' | Report | Sandeep Nair ?'; Assis Chand 37' |

Referee: Scott Kidson (Australia)
2008-06-11

| New Zealand | 13–1 | Tuvalu |
|---|---|---|
| Bakr Al Saudi 2', 5', 15', 16', ?', 32', ?', 40'; Ouadhah Ragued 15'; Marvin Eakins 21'; Gregory O’Connor 23'; Yukin Naidoo ?'; Andrew Gwilliam 37' | Report | Mahanga Teiaputi 35' |

Referee: Allan Alick (Vanuatu)

==== Day 5 ====
2008-06-12

| Tahiti | 9–2 | Fiji |
|---|---|---|
| Matana Bea 13', 15', 23'; Tetuanui Tinomoe 5', 26'; Jimmy Riaria 7', 34'; Usiera Pukoki 33'; Lysis Tauha 38' | | Nayzal Siga Ali 23'; Assis Chand 23' |

Attendance: 1500
Referee: Peter L. Pakoatong (Vanuatu)
2008-06-12

| New Caledonia | 10–2 | Tuvalu |
|---|---|---|
| Yvan Pourouoro 2', 34'; Alexandre Rosso 8', 33'; Albert Hnailolo 10', 19'; Benoit Moglia 18', 26'; Stevens Guillemin 10'; Gino Rene Marcias 38' | | Starchel Soloseni 17'; Paitela Kelemene 25' |

Attendance: 1500
2008-06-12

| Vanuatu | 5–1 | Solomon Islands |
|---|---|---|
| Louis Dominique 16', 34'; Fedy Vava 24'; Saen Wowut Fanai ?'; Terry Quare 35' | | James Egeta 27' |

Attendance: 1500
Referee: Amitesh Behaji (Fiji)

==== Day 6 ====
2008-06-13

| Fiji | 13–2 | Tuvalu |
|---|---|---|
| Kamal Hassan 8', 9', 11', 17', 18', 25', 36', 39'; Mira Sahib 20'; Sandeep Nair 27'; Azmat Begg ?'; Assis Chand 36' | | Peniuna Kaitu 16'; Semalie Fotu or Paitela Kelemene ?' |

Referee: Stephan Parage (New Caledonia)
2008-06-13

| Tahiti | 2–4 | Solomon Islands |
|---|---|---|
| Matana Bea 10', 25' | | Micah Lea'alafa 3'; Jenan Kapu 9'; James Egeta 25'; Jack Wetney 39' |

Referee: Chris Colley (Australia)
2008-06-13

| New Caledonia | 2–3 | New Zealand |
|---|---|---|
| Marvin Eakins 9' (o.g.); Edouard Muracciolii 36' | | Joshua Martin 9'; Victor Zaia 27'; Bakr Al Saudi 35' |

Referee: Allan Alick (Vanuatu)

==== Day 7 ====
2008-06-14

| Tuvalu | 0–12 | Solomon Islands |
|---|---|---|
| | | Micah Lea'alafa 2', 17', 19', 35'; Elliot Ragamo 1', 21'; Jack Wetney 10', 26'; Francis Lafai 37', 38'; Alfred Punguika 21'; James Egeta 30' |

Referee: Francois Trolliard (New Caledonia)
2008-06-14

| Fiji | 4–1 | New Zealand |
|---|---|---|
| Asis Chand 38', 38'; Kamil Hassan 31'; Muni Arvindra Naidu 39' | | Joshua Martin 37' |

Referee: Teihotu Taerea (Tahiti)
2008-06-14

| Tahiti | 2–1 | Vanuatu |
|---|---|---|
| Michel Maihuri 15'; Matana Bea 39' | | Fedy Vava 9' |

Oceanian Futsal Championship
2008 Winners
Solomon Islands
1st Title

== Goalscorers ==
There were 163 goals scored in 21 matches, for an average of 7.76 goals per match.

14 goals

- (Fiji) Kamal Hassan

12 goals

- (Solomon Islands) Micah Lea’alafa

9 goals

- (Vanuatu) Jack Vira Ala
- (New Zealand) Bakr Al Saudi

8 goals

- (Vanuatu) Elliot Ragomo

== Match officials ==
Referees

- (Australia) Chris Colley
- (Australia) Scott Kidson
- (Fiji) Amitesh Behaji
- (New Caledonia) Stephan Parage
- (New Caledonia) Francois Trolliard
- (French Polynesia) Teihotu Taerea
- (Vanuatu) Allan Alick
- (Vanuatu) Peter L. Pakoatong
