= 2010 Oceanian Futsal Championship =

Tournament details
- Host country: Fiji
- Dates: 8–14 August 2010
- Teams: 7 (from 1 confederation)

Final positions
- Champions: Solomon Islands (3rd title)
- Runners-up: Fiji
- Third place: New Zealand
- Fourth place: Vanuatu

Tournament statistics
- Matches played: 21
- Goals scored: 174 (8.29 per match)
- Top scorer(s): (Solomon Islands) Elliot Ragomo (15 goals)
- Best player: (Solomon Islands) Elliot Ragomo
- Best goalkeeper: (French Polynesia) Atanui Tetihia
- Fair play award: Tahiti

The 2010 OFC Futsal Championship was the seventh edition of the main international futsal tournament of the Oceanian region. It took place from 8 August to 14 August 2010, and was hosted by Fiji, which had also hosted the two previous editions.

The number of participating nations rose to seven, up from four in 2009, as New Zealand, Tuvalu and French Polynesia (under the name "Tahiti") returned to the competition. Those three nations had previously participated in 2008. Vanuatu, New Caledonia, defending champion Solomon Islands, and hosts Fiji, all returned from 2009.

The 2010 championship was played on a round robin league system. In 2009, the championship had been played with a knock out group stage followed by a final. Consequently, there were twenty-one matches played in 2010, compared to just eight in 2009.

Prior to the competition, the Solomon Star reported that Fiji and New Zealand were expected to be the main threats to Solomon Islands' attempt to win its third consecutive title.

The Championship was won by Solomon Islands, for the third consecutive time. The country achieved a perfect record of six wins in six games (rounding them off with a 21–2 victory over Tuvalu on the final day), totalling eighteen points. Fiji came second, with four wins (and thus twelve points), and a positive goal differential of 8. New Zealand was third, also with four wins, and a positive goal differential of 4. Solomon Islands' team, the Kurukuru, reportedly received "a hero’s welcome" upon their return to Honiara.

== Championship ==
The seven teams played one another in a round robin league system over the span of the championship.

| Teams | GP | W | D | L | GF | GA | GD | Pts |
|---|---|---|---|---|---|---|---|---|
| Solomon Islands | 6 | 6 | 0 | 0 | 59 | 16 | +43 | 18 |
| Fiji | 6 | 4 | 0 | 2 | 24 | 16 | +8 | 12 |
| New Zealand | 6 | 4 | 0 | 2 | 26 | 22 | +4 | 12 |
| Vanuatu | 6 | 3 | 0 | 3 | 21 | 22 | -1 | 9 |
| New Caledonia | 6 | 2 | 0 | 4 | 25 | 29 | -4 | 6 |
| Tahiti | 6 | 2 | 0 | 4 | 12 | 16 | -4 | 6 |
| Tuvalu | 6 | 0 | 0 | 6 | 7 | 53 | -46 | 0 |

=== August 8 ===
2010-08-08

| Tuvalu | 1 - 7 | Vanuatu |
|---|---|---|
| Easter TEKAFA 11' | Report | Ben HUNGAI 10', 21' (32); Lui SIFAS 21'; Don MANSALE 24'; Louis DOMINIQUE 26'; Terry QUARE 37' |

Referee: Rajnish DAVE (FIJ)
2010-08-08

| Solomon Islands | 9 - 2 | New Caledonia |
|---|---|---|
| Micah LEA'ALAFA 3', 18'; Lenson BISILI 9'; Elliot RAGOMO 10', 23', 34'; Jack WETNEY 39', 39'; own goal 19' | Report | Cedrick HUMUNI 21'; Caryl THEPINIER 28' |

Referee: Amitesh BEHARI (FIJ)
2010-08-08

| Fiji | 2 - 0 | Tahiti |
|---|---|---|
| Petero DAUNISEKA 3'; Kamal HASSAN 40' | Report |

Referee: Peter PAKOATONG (VAN)

=== August 9 ===
2010-08-09

| Vanuatu | 5 - 4 | New Caledonia |
|---|---|---|
| Louis DOMINIQUE 13'; Junior MALAS 19'; Don MANSALE 26'; Jack Vira ALA 33', 38' | Report | Cedrick HUMUNI 2', 31', 32'; Anderson PAULIN 5' |

Referee: Rajnish DAVE (FIJ)
2010-08-09

| Tuvalu | 0 - 4 | Tahiti |
|---|---|---|
| | Report | Teva DUROT 6'; Loic OLDHAM 10'; René DEVENDEVILLE 34' (pen.), pen. |

Referee: Paul COIC (TAH)
2010-08-09

| Solomon Islands | 8 - 4 | New Zealand |
|---|---|---|
| Micah LEA'ALAFA 5', 21', 29', 29'; Jenan KAPU 11'; Jack WETNEY 26'; Elliot RAGOMO 36', 38' | Report | Micky MALIVUK 5', 13', 14'; Marvin EAKINS 30' |

Referee: Peter PAKOATONG (VAN)

=== August 10 ===
2010-08-10

| New Caledonia | 2 - 3 | Tahiti |
|---|---|---|
| Ivann POUROUORO 5'; Romain GUITTON 13' | Report | Teva DUROT 21'; Mana FAARAHIA 26'; Teivarii KAIHA 34' |

Referee: Peter PAKOATONG
2010-08-10

| Vanuatu | 2 - 3 | New Zealand |
|---|---|---|
| Ben HUNGAI 16', 35' | Report | Marvin EAKINS 19', 39'; Lucas SILVA 30' |

Referee: Amitesh BEHARI (FIJ)
2010-08-10

| Tuvalu | 1 - 5 | Fiji |
|---|---|---|
| Ola ELIU 6' | Report | Simione VESA 33'; Kamal HASSAN 36', 39', 40'; Petero DAUNISEKA 38' |

Referee: Rex KAMUSU

=== August 11 ===
2010-08-11

| Tahiti | 1 - 2 | New Zealand |
|---|---|---|
| Teva DUROT 37' | Report | Said SOLEIMANPOUR 32'; Lucas SILVA 38' |

Referee: Rajnish DAVE
2010-08-11

| New Caledonia | 2 - 6 | Fiji |
|---|---|---|
| Loic Caunes 6', 22' | Report | Kamal Hassan 10' (pen.); Uraia Loki 24', 39'; Sedrick Dutt ?; Siaa Ali ? |

2010-08-11

| Vanuatu | 3 - 8 | Solomon Islands |
|---|---|---|
| Nemani ROQARA 39'; Ben HUNGAI 40'; own goal 39' | Report | Jack WETNEY 6', 30'; Micah LEA'ALAFA 8', 26', 38'; Coleman MAKAU 18'; Lenson BISILI 29'; Jenan KAPU 38' |

Referee: Paul COIC

=== August 12 ===
2010-08-12

| New Zealand | 6 - 4 | Fiji |
|---|---|---|
| Micky MALIVUK 5', 15', 27', 35'; Dylan MANICKUM 14'; Lucas SILVA 28' | Report | Sedrick DUTT 18'; Roy KRISHNA 24'; Petero DAUNISEKA 28'; Jo DUGUCAGI 33' |

Referee: Paul COIC
2010-08-12

| Tahiti | 2 - 6 | Solomon Islands |
|---|---|---|
| Meiarii SI MAN 12'; Loic OLDHAM 28' | Report | Lenson BISILI 9', 14'; Elliot RAGOMO 14'; Jack WETNEY 27'; Micah LEA'ALAFA 29'; Jeffery BULE 30' |

Referee: Amitesh BEHARI
2010-08-12

| New Caledonia | 9 - 2 | Tuvalu |
|---|---|---|
| Cedrick HUMUNI 2', 15', 15', 28'; Loic CAUNES 6'; Louis WAISHITINE 21'; Yoann WAIKEDRE 30'; Caryl THEPINIER 32'; Gabriel AREUI 36' | Report | Laupula HUEHUE 7'; own goal 39' |

Referee: Taurere KAOKO (TAH)

=== August 13 ===
2010-08-13

| Fiji | 3 - 7 | Solomon Islands |
|---|---|---|
| Petero DAUNISEKA 4', 40': Ajesh NARAYAN 33' | Report | Jack WETNEY 1', 5'; Jeffery BULE 13'; Elliot RAGOMO 20', 24'; Coleman MAKAU 33'; Lenson BISILI 37' |

Referee: Peter PAKOATONG
2010-08-13

| New Zealand | 7 - 1 | Tuvalu |
|---|---|---|
| Dylan MANICKUM 18'; Marvin EAKINS 18'; Said SOLEIMANPOUR 19'; Miro MAJOR 20', 20'; Micky MALIVUK 33'; Brayden LISSINGTON 38' | Report | Jerome FUNAFUTI 35' |

Referee: Amitesh BEHARI
2010-08-13

| Tahiti | 2 - 4 | Vanuatu |
|---|---|---|
| Meirii Si Man 5'; Mana Faarahia 5' | Report | Louis Dominique ?; Junior Malas 19'; Nemani Roqara ?; Ben Hungai 39' |

=== August 14 ===
2010-08-14

| Solomon Islands | 21 - 2 | Tuvalu |
|---|---|---|
| James EGETA 1', 27', 38'; Elliot RAGOMO 2', 2', 3', 5', 8', ?, 22'; Micah LEA'ALAFA 6', 9', 21', 38'; George STEVENSON 17'; Matthias SARU 18', 24', 33'; Jack WETNEY 24', 32'; Coleman MAKAU 34' | Report | Easter TEKAFA 21'; Jerome FUNAFUTI 37' |

Referee: Rajnish DAVE
2010-08-14

| Fiji | 4 - 0 | Vanuatu |
|---|---|---|
| Roy KRISHNA 11'; Kamal HASSAN 16', 38'; Petero DAUNISEKA 40' | Report |

Referee: Paul COIC
2010-08-14

| New Zealand | 4 - 6 | New Caledonia |
|---|---|---|
| Micky Malivuk 4', 32'; Said Soleimanpour ?; Miro Major 21' | Report | Cedrick Humuni 23', 38'; Loic Caunes ?; Anderson Paulin ?; Caryl Thepinier ?; Mainon Kaowi ? |

2010 Oceanian Futsal Championship

Solomon Islands
Third title

== Awards ==
The following awards were given at the conclusion of the tournament.

| Award | Player |
|---|---|
| Golden Ball | (Solomon Islands) Elliot Ragomo |
| Golden Boot | (Solomon Islands) Elliot Ragomo |
| Golden Gloves | (French Polynesia) Atanui Tetihia |
| Fair Play Award | Tahiti |

== Match officials ==
Referees

- (Fiji) Amitesh Behari
- (Fiji) Rajnish Dave
- (French Polynesia) Taurere Kaoko
- (Solomon Islands) Rex Kamusu
- (French Polynesia) Paul Coic
- (Vanuatu) Peter Pakoatong
