= Dylan Manickum =

New Zealand footballer

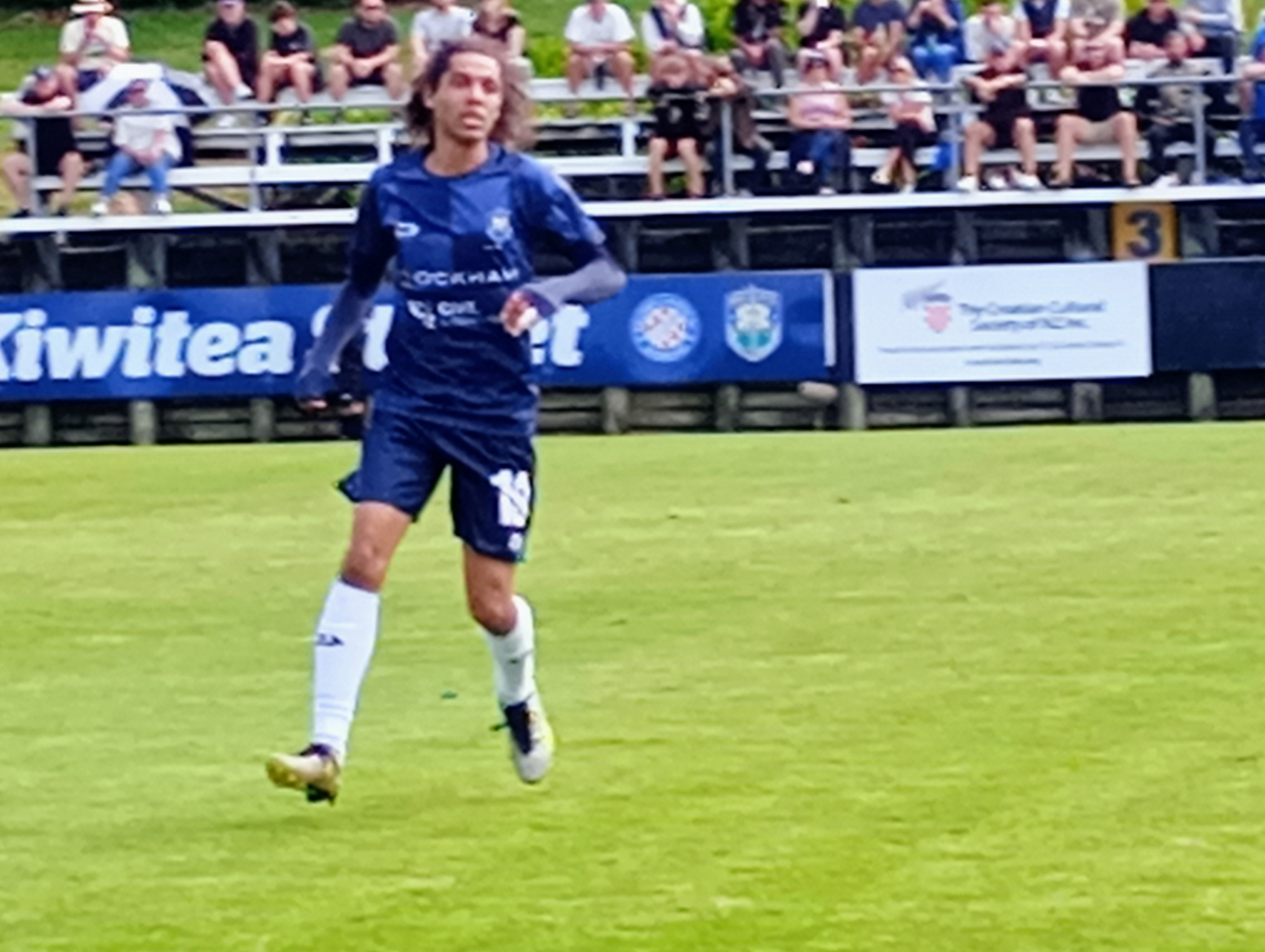
- Manickum playing for Auckland City in 2024

Personal information
- Full name: Dylan Ross Manickum
- Date of birth: 16 June 1992 (age 34)
- Place of birth: Auckland, New Zealand
- Height: 1.76 m (5 ft 9 in)
- Position: Forward

Team information
- Current team: Auckland City
- Number: 10

Youth career
- 2009–2011: Ellerslie

Senior career*
Years	Team	Apps	(Gls)
2011–2013	Ellerslie	50	(8)
2014–2018	Waitakere United		
	Waitakere City	60	(38)
2018–	Auckland City	128	(48)
2018–2019	1. FC Allstars Wiener Neustadt		
- AFF Futsal
2020–	Auckland City Futsal		

International career
2010–	New Zealand Futsal	63	(37)
- * Club domestic league appearances and goals as of 9 May 2026

Dylan Ross Manickum (born 16 June 1992) is a New Zealand footballer and futsal player who plays for National League club Auckland City and the New Zealand men's national futsal team.

== Personal life ==
Outside of football, Manickum works as a site engineer.

== Club career ==
=== Youth career ===
Manickum played for Ellerslie Reserves from 2009 to 2011 before making his first team debut on 2 April 2011 against Lynn-Avon United. He made scored 8 goals in his 50 appearances for the first team.

=== Waitakere United ===
Manickum spent four years at Waitakere United from 2014 to 2018.

=== Waitakere City ===
During his time at Waitakere City in the winter seasons, Manickum scored 38 goals in 60 appearances.

=== Auckland City ===
On 27 September 2018, Manickum signed for Auckland City from cross-town rivals Waitakere United. Manickum made his 100th appearance for the Navy Blues in the 2022 New Zealand National League grand final.

== International career ==
Manickum made his debut for the New Zealand national futsal team in 2010. On 2 October 2023, in the 2023 OFC Futsal Nations Cup game against Fiji, Manickum became the record appearance holder, passing then national team coach Marvin Eakins. Manickum captained New Zealand to their first ever FIFA Futsal World Cup after winning the 2023 OFC Futsal Nations Cup.

== Career statistics ==
As of match played 9 May 2026

Appearances and goals by club, season and competition
Club	Season	League			Chatham Cup		Continental		Other		Total	
Club	Season	Division	Apps	Goals	Apps	Goals	Apps	Goals	Apps	Goals	Apps	Goals
Waitakere United	2014–15	Premiership	15	3	—		—		2	0	17	3
Waitakere United	2015–16	Premiership	7	2	—		—		—		7	2
Waitakere United	2016–17	Premiership	17	0	—		—		1	0	18	0
Waitakere United	2017–18	Premiership	18	2	—		—		—		18	2
Waitakere United	Total		57	7	0	0	0	0	3	0	60	7
Auckland City	2018–19	Premiership	12	5	—		5 (Note: Appearances in OFC Champions League)	2	1	0	18	7
Auckland City	2019–20	Premiership	13	3	—		2	1	—		15	4
Auckland City	2020–21	Premiership	12	5	—		—		2	2	14	7
Auckland City	2021	National League	16	5	2	4	—		—		18	9
Auckland City	2022	National League	21	6	1	1	4	2	—		26	9
Auckland City	2023	National League	12	7	0	0	6	0	1	0	19	7
Auckland City	2024	National League	20	3	2	0	7	3	1	0	30	6
Auckland City	2025	National League	17	1	0	0	5	2	3	0	25	3
Auckland City	2026	National League	5	6	0	0	0	0	1	0	6	6
Auckland City	Total		128	41	5	5	29	10	9	2	171	58
Career total			185	48	5	5	29	10	9	2	231	65

== Honours ==
Auckland City

- Northern League: 2021, 2022, 2023, 2024
- New Zealand Football Championship: 2019–20; premiership: 2018–19, 2019–20, 2020–21
- New Zealand National League: 2022, 2024, 2025
- Charity Cup: 2018, 2019, 2020
- Chatham Cup: 2022
- OFC Champions League: 2022, 2023, 2024, 2025

Auckland City futsal

- New Zealand Futsal SuperLeague: 2020

New Zealand futsal

- OFC Futsal Nations Cup: 2023

Individual

- NZF Futsal Player of the Year: 2020, 2023
- OFC Futsal Nations Cup Golden Ball: 2023
- Jack Batty Memorial Cup: 2023
- OFC Champions League Golden Ball: 2025
