= New Zealand national futsal team =

New Zealand
- Shirt badge/Association crest
- Nickname(s): Futsal Whites
- Association: New Zealand Football (NZF)
- Confederation: OFC (Oceania)
- Head coach: (New Zealand) Marvin Eakins
- Captain: Dylan Manickum
- Most caps: Dylan Manickum (63)
- FIFA code: NZL
- FIFA ranking: 54 ▼6 (24 September 2026)
Home colours	Away colours

First international
- Spain 19–2 New Zealand (Melbourne, Australia; 21 October 1988)

Biggest win
- Kiribati 1–21 New Zealand (Suva, Fiji; 17 May 2011)

Biggest defeat
- Spain 19–2 New Zealand (Melbourne, Australia; 21 October 1988)

FIFA World Cup
- Appearances: 1 (First in 2024)
- Best result: Group stage (2024)

OFC Futsal Nations Cup
- Appearances: 12 (First in 1992)
- Best result: Champions (2022, 2023)

The New Zealand national futsal team, nicknamed the Futsal Whites, is the representative side for New Zealand in international futsal and is governed by New Zealand Football (NZF). The nickname is a reference to the New Zealand national football team which is known as the All Whites, which in turn is based on the national team nicknames related to the All Blacks.

== Tournament records ==
=== FIFA Futsal World Cup ===
FIFA Futsal World Cup
Year	Round	Position	Pld	W	D	L	GS	GA	Squad
(Netherlands) 1989	Did not enter								
(Hong Kong) 1992	Did not qualify								
(Spain) 1996	Did not enter								
(Guatemala) 2000	Did not qualify								
(Chinese Taipei) 2004	Did not qualify								
(Brazil) 2008	Did not qualify								
(Thailand) 2012	Did not qualify								
(Colombia) 2016	Did not qualify								
(Lithuania) 2021	Did not qualify								
(Uzbekistan) 2024	Group stage	23rd	3	0	0	3	2	20	Squad
Total	Group stage	1/10	3	0	0	3	2	20	–

=== FIFUSA/AMF Futsal World Cup ===
FIFUSA Futsal World Championship record
Year	Host	Round	Position	Pld	W	D	L	GS	GA
1982	Brazil	Did not enter							
1985	Spain	Did not enter							
1988	Australia	Group stage	15th	3	0	0	3	5	40
1991	Italy	Withdrew							
1994	Argentina	Did not enter							
1997	Mexico	Did not enter							
2000	Bolivia	Did not enter							
2003	Paraguay	Did not enter							
2007	Argentina	Did not enter							
2011	Colombia	Group stage	15th	3	0	0	3	4	18
2015	Belarus	Did not enter							
2019	Argentina	Did not enter							
Total		Group stage	2/12	6	0	0	6	9	58

=== OFC Futsal Nations Cup ===
OFC Futsal Nations Cup / OFC Futsal Cup record
Year	Round	Position	Pld	W	D	L	GF	GA
(Australia) 1992	Third place	3rd	4	0	0	4	10	27
(Vanuatu) 1996	Did not enter							
(Vanuatu) 1999	Fifth place	5th	6	2	0	4	12	34
(Australia) 2004	Runners-up	2nd	5	4	0	1	22	14
(Fiji) 2008	Fourth place	4th	6	3	0	3	22	16
(Fiji) 2009	Did not enter							
(Fiji) 2010	Third place	3rd	6	4	0	2	26	21
(Fiji) 2011	Third place	3rd	5	2	3	0	31	13
(New Zealand) 2013	Third place	3rd	5	3	0	2	16	15
(New Caledonia) 2014	Third place	3rd	4	2	0	2	10	6
(Fiji) 2016	Runners-up	2nd	5	4	0	1	16	8
(New Caledonia) 2019	Runners-up	2nd	5	4	1	0	32	10
(Fiji) 2022	Champions	1st	5	4	1	0	33	7
(New Zealand) 2023	Champions	1st	5	5	0	0	36	7
(Fiji) 2025	Runners-up	2nd	4	3	0	1	20	7
Total	2 titles	13/15	65	40	5	20	286	185

== Futsal rivalries ==
=== Australia ===
No.	Competition	Date	Home team	Result	Away team
	1992 Oceanian Futsal Championship	16 June 1992	Australia	9–2	New Zealand
	1992 Oceanian Futsal Championship	19 June 1992	New Zealand	0–3	Australia
	1999 Oceanian Futsal Championship	26 August 1999	Australia	10–1	New Zealand
	2004 Oceanian Futsal Championship	26 July 2004	New Zealand	0–4	Australia
	Friendly	3 May 2008	Australia	11–2	New Zealand
	Trans-Tasman Cup	21 September 2012	New Zealand	0–3	Australia
	Trans-Tasman Cup	22 September 2012	New Zealand	1–6	Australia
	Trans-Tasman Cup	23 September 2012	New Zealand	2–6	Australia
	2013 OFC Futsal Championship	26 July 2013	New Zealand	0–2	Australia
	Trans-Tasman Cup	11 July 2014	New Zealand	3–5	Australia
	Trans-Tasman Cup	12 July 2014	New Zealand	0–6	Australia
	Trans-Tasman Cup	13 July 2014	New Zealand	1–7	Australia
	Trans-Tasman Cup	8 July 2015	New Zealand	2–4	Australia
	Trans-Tasman Cup	9 July 2015	New Zealand	1–6	Australia
	Trans-Tasman Cup	10 July 2015	New Zealand	2–3	Australia
	Continental Futsal Championships (Thailand)	8 February 2025	New Zealand	0–1	Australia

=== Solomon Islands ===
No.	Competition	Date	Home team	Result	Away team
	2004 Oceanian Futsal Championship	27 July 2004	Solomon Islands	4–8	New Zealand
	2008 Oceanian Futsal Championship	8 June 2008	Solomon Islands	5–1	New Zealand
	2010 Oceanian Futsal Championship	9 August 2010	Solomon Islands	8–4	New Zealand
	2013 OFC Futsal Championship	23 July 2013	New Zealand	7–3	Solomon Islands
	2016 OFC Futsal Championship	10 February 2016	Solomon Islands	4–1	New Zealand
	2019 OFC Futsal Nations Cup	2 November 2019	Solomon Islands	5–5 (Note: Score was 5–5 after 40 minutes and extra time. Solomon Islands won the penalty shoot-out 2–1.)	New Zealand
	2022 OFC Futsal Cup	18 September 2022	New Zealand	6–2	Solomon Islands
	2023 OFC Futsal Nations Cup	5 October 2023	New Zealand	4–2	Solomon Islands
	2025 OFC Futsal Cup	20 September 2025	New Zealand	1–2	Solomon Islands

== Players ==
=== Current squad ===
The following players were called up to the squad for the 2024 FIFA Futsal World Cup.

Caps and goals updated as of 31 March 2024 after the match against Morocco.

No.	Pos.	Player	Date of birth (age)	Caps	Goals	Club
1	GK	Mike Antamanov	27 April 1987 (aged 37)	15	1	(New Zealand Football) Auckland City Futsal
12	GK	Patrick Steele	14 November 2000 (aged 23)	12	0	(New Zealand Football) Waikato Rapids
5	DF	Miroslav Malivuk	17 July 1983 (aged 41)	42	23	(New Zealand Football) Palmerston North Marist
7	DF	Ethan Martin	11 January 2000 (aged 24)	15	8	(New Zealand Football) Waikato Rapids
8	DF	Logan Wisnewski	16 November 2000 (aged 23)	20	5	(The Football Association) LDN Movements
9	DF	Stephen Ashby-Peckham	9 April 1995 (aged 29)	44	17	(New Zealand Football) Auckland City Futsal
2	MF	Adam Paulsen	2 June 2001 (aged 23)	15	6	(New Zealand Football) Auckland City Futsal
3	MF	Hamish Grey	6 April 2002 (aged 22)	15	7	(Royal Spanish Football Federation) Zambú CFS Pinatar
10	MF	Dylan Manickum (captain)	16 June 1992 (aged 32)	66	38	(New Zealand Football) Auckland City Futsal
11	MF	Jordan Ditfort	9 June 1998 (aged 26)	26	13	(The Football Association) Bloomsbury Futsal
13	MF	Oban Hawkins	6 October 2000 (aged 23)	20	7	(New Zealand Football) Southern United
14	MF	Casey Sharplin	26 August 2001 (aged 23)	15	5	(New Zealand Football) Waikato Rapids
4	FW	Art Twigg	17 April 1997 (aged 27)	10	3	(New Zealand Football) Auckland City Futsal
6	FW	Rahan Ali	3 April 1997 (aged 27)	15	16	(Football Australia) Moreland Blues FC

=== Recent call-ups ===
The following players have been called up within the last 12 months and remain eligible for selection.

Pos.	Player	Date of birth (age)	Caps	Goals	Club	Latest call-up
DF	Thomas Picken	8 March 1998 (age 28)	7	1	(New Zealand) Auckland City Futsal	v. Morocco, 31 March 2024
	Luc Saker		23	4	(New Zealand) Capital Futsal	v. Morocco, 31 March 2024
	Denny Twigg		5	0	(New Zealand) Auckland City Futsal	v. Morocco, 31 March 2024
	Sean Beresford		0	0	(New Zealand) Capital Futsal	v. Morocco, 31 March 2024
	Hemi Innes		0	0	(New Zealand) Canterbury United Dragons	v. Morocco, 31 March 2024
	Sam Twigg		0	0	(New Zealand) Auckland City Futsal	v. Morocco, 31 March 2024
^{INJ} Withdrew due to injury^{PRE} Preliminary squad / standby^{RET} Retired from the national team^{SUS} Serving suspension^{WD} Player withdrew from the squad due to non-injury issue.

== Current technical staff ==
Position	Name
Head coach	(New Zealand) Marvin Eakins
Assistant coach	(New Zealand) Enrico Bitencourt da Silva Meirelles
Technical/Video Analyst	(New Zealand) Joshua Greet
GK Coach	(New Zealand) Elias Billeh
Physiotherapist	(New Zealand) Elliot Cooper
Team Manager	(New Zealand) Jason Win
Strength and Conditioning Coach	(New Zealand) Nick Chong

== Former players ==
Position	Player	Caps/Goals	Federation/Club
Goalkeeper	Atta Elayyan	22/1	Mainland Futsal (New Zealand)

== Results and fixtures ==
=== 2026 ===
Continental Futsal Championship	New Zealand	0–6	Thailand	Thailand
		Report

Continental Futsal Championship	New Zealand	1–4	Vietnam	Thailand
		Report

Continental Futsal Championship	New Zealand	0–3 (walkover)	Russia	Thailand
		Report

Continental Futsal Championship	New Zealand	1–6	Afghanistan	Thailand
		Report

== Records ==
As of 31 March 2024
Players in bold are still active with New Zealand.

=== Most capped players ===
Rank	Player	Caps	Goals	First cap	Latest cap
1	**Dylan Manickum**	66	38	2010	31 March 2024
2	Marvin Eakins	59	?	?	?

== Head-to-head record ==
The following table shows New Zealand's head-to-head record in the FIFA Futsal World Cup.

Opponent	Pld	W	D	L	GF	GA	GD	Win %
Kazakhstan	1	0	0	1	0	10	−10	0.00
Libya	1	0	0	1	1	3	−2	0.00
Spain	1	0	0	1	1	7	−6	0.00
Total	**3**	**0**	**0**	**3**	**2**	**20**	**−18**	**0.00**
