= Fiji national futsal team =

Fiji
- Nickname(s): Bula Boys
- Association: Fiji Football Association
- Confederation: OFC (Oceania)
- FIFA code: FIJ
- FIFA ranking: 80 ▼5 (29 August 2025)
Home colours	Away colours

First international
- Fiji 0–5 Australia (Port Vila, Vanuatu, 3 August 1996)

Biggest win
- Fiji 22–3 Kiribati (Suva, Fiji, 18 May 2011)

Biggest defeat
- Australia 11–1 Fiji (Port Vila, Vanuatu, 6 August 1996)

FIFA World Cup
- Appearances: 0

OFC Futsal Championship
- Appearances: 8 (First in 1996)
- Best result: 2nd place (1999, 2009, 2010)

The Fiji national futsal team was formed by the Fiji Football Association, the governing body of futsal in Fiji and represents the country in international futsal competitions. The current coach is Jerry Sam, a former head coach of Solomon Islands Futsal team. He led them to their first world cup. Sam was announced as head coach in 2022.

== Tournament records ==
=== FIFA Futsal World Cup record ===
FIFA World Cup Record
Year	Round	Pld	W	D	L	GS	GA
Netherlands 1989	Did not enter	-	-	-	-	-	-
Hong Kong 1992	Did not enter	-	-	-	-	-	-
Spain 1996	Did not qualify	-	-	-	-	-	-
Guatemala 2000	Did not qualify	-	-	-	-	-	-
Taiwan 2004	Did not qualify	-	-	-	-	-	-
Brazil 2008	Did not qualify	-	-	-	-	-	-
Thailand 2012	Did not qualify	-	-	-	-	-	-
Colombia 2016	Did not qualify	-	-	-	-	-	-
Lithuania 2021	Did not qualify	-	-	-	-	-	-
Uzbekistan 2024	Did not qualify	-	-	-	-	-	-
Total	0/10	-	-	-	-	-	-

=== Oceanian Futsal Championship record ===
Oceanian Futsal Championship Record
Year	Round	Position	Pld	W	D	L	GS	GA
(Australia) 1992	Did not enter							
(Vanuatu) 1996	Third place	3rd	6	2	1	3	26	31
(Vanuatu) 1999	Runners-up	2nd	6	4	1	1	27	15
(Australia) 2004	Fourth place	4th	5	2	0	3	11	11
(Fiji) 2008	Fifth place	5th	6	3	0	3	31	31
(Fiji) 2009	Runners-up	2nd	4	2	0	2	9	15
(Fiji) 2010	Runners-up	2nd	6	4	0	2	24	16
(Fiji) 2011	Group stage		4	2	1	1	36	18
(New Zealand) 2013	Did not enter							
(New Caledonia) 2014	Did not enter							
(Fiji) 2016	Group stage		5	0	0	5	5	27
(New Caledonia) 2019	Group stage		5	3	0	2	23	23
(Fiji) 2022	Group stage		5	2	1	2	26	15
(New Zealand) 2023	Fourth place	4th	5	2	0	3	19	20
Total		11/14	57	26	4	27	237	222

== Current squad ==
The team comprises players from six districts and all players named are of Indo-Fijian ethnicity. Six southern, two western and four northern division players have made the team.

- From Lautoka : Alvin Avinesh, Arvindra Naidu.
- From Labasa : Azmat Begg, Imtiaz Begg, Dinesh Mudliar, Sandeep Nair.
- From Rewa : Kamal Hassan, Wasim Ali.
- From Navua : Siga Ali.
- From Nasinu : Ashish Chand.
- From Suva : Vikash Prasad, Mira Hussein Sahib.
