= 1999 Oceanian Futsal Championship =

Tournament details
- Host country: Vanuatu
- Dates: 21–28 August 1999
- Teams: 7 (from 1 confederation)
- Venue: 1 (in 1 host city)

Final positions
- Champions: Australia (3rd title)
- Runners-up: Fiji
- Third place: Vanuatu
- Fourth place: Papua New Guinea

Tournament statistics
- Matches played: 21
- Goals scored: 150 (7.14 per match)

The 1999 Oceanian Futsal Championship (OFC) was the third edition of the main international futsal tournament of the Oceanian region. It took place from 21 August to 28 August 1999, and was hosted by Port Vila, Vanuatu.

The tournament also acted as a qualifying tournament for the 2000 FIFA Futsal World Championship in Guatemala. The Australia won the tournament, and qualified for the World Cup.

== Group stage ==
=== Group ===
Team	Pld	W	D	L	GF	GA	GD	Pts
Australia	6	6	0	0	41	4	+37	18
Fiji	6	4	1	1	27	15	+12	13
Vanuatu	6	3	2	1	22	14	+8	11
Papua New Guinea	6	3	1	2	23	16	+7	10
New Zealand	6	2	0	4	12	34	-22	6
Samoa	6	1	0	5	19	40	-21	3
Cook Islands	6	0	0	6	6	27	-21	0

All time at UTC+11

21 August 1999	New Zealand	3–2	Cook Islands	Port Vila, Vanuatu
11:00

21 August 1999	Fiji	1–3	Australia	Port Vila, Vanuatu
14:00

21 August 1999	Papua New Guinea	2–2	Vanuatu	Port Vila, Vanuatu
17:00

23 August 1999	Samoa	1–13	Australia	Port Vila, Vanuatu
11:00

23 August 1999	New Zealand	2–4	Vanuatu	Port Vila, Vanuatu
14:00

23 August 1999	Fiji	2–1	Papua New Guinea	Port Vila, Vanuatu
17:00

24 August 1999	Cook Islands	0–5	Vanuatu	Port Vila, Vanuatu
11:00

24 August 1999	Samoa	4–6	Papua New Guinea	Port Vila, Vanuatu
14:00

24 August 1999	New Zealand	1–7	Fiji	Port Vila, Vanuatu
17:00

25 August 1999	Australia	7–1	Papua New Guinea	Port Vila, Vanuatu
11:00

25 August 1999	Cook Islands	1–4	Fiji	Port Vila, Vanuatu
14:00

25 August 1999	Samoa	3–4	New Zealand	Port Vila, Vanuatu
17:00

26 August 1999	Vanuatu	5–5	Fiji	Port Vila, Vanuatu
11:00

26 August 1999	Australia	10–1	New Zealand	Port Vila, Vanuatu
14:00

26 August 1999	Cook Islands	3–5	Samoa	Port Vila, Vanuatu
17:00

27 August 1999	Papua New Guinea	8–1	New Zealand	Port Vila, Vanuatu
11:00

27 August 1999	Vanuatu	6–2	Samoa	Port Vila, Vanuatu
14:00

27 August 1999	Australia	5–0	Cook Islands	Port Vila, Vanuatu
17:00

28 August 1999	Fiji	8–4	Samoa	Port Vila, Vanuatu
11:00

28 August 1999	Papua New Guinea	5–0	Cook Islands	Port Vila, Vanuatu
14:00

28 August 1999	Vanuatu	0–3	Australia	Port Vila, Vanuatu
17:00

== Champion ==
1999 Oceanian Futsal Championship winners

Australia
Third title
