= 1992 Oceanian Futsal Championship =

Tournament details
- Host country: Australia
- Dates: 15–20 June 1992
- Teams: 3 (from 1 confederation)
- Venue: (in 1 host city)

Final positions
- Champions: Australia (1st title)
- Runners-up: Vanuatu
- Third place: New Zealand

Tournament statistics
- Matches played: 6
- Goals scored: 57 (9.5 per match)

The 1992 Oceanian Futsal Championship (OFC) was the first edition of the main international futsal tournament of the Oceanian region. It took place from 15 June to 20 June 1992, and was hosted by Brisbane, Australia.

The tournament also acted as a qualifying tournament for the 1992 FIFA Futsal World Championship in Hong Kong. Australia won the tournament, and qualified for the World Cup.

== Group stage ==
=== Group ===
Team	Pld	W	D	L	GF	GA	GD	Pts
Australia	4	4	0	0	28	6	+22	8
Vanuatu	4	2	0	2	19	24	-5	4
New Zealand	4	0	0	4	10	27	-17	0

All time at UTC+10

15 June 1992	Australia	8–1	Vanuatu	Brisbane, Australia
17:00

16 June 1992	Australia	9–2	New Zealand	Brisbane, Australia
17:00

17 June 1992	New Zealand	4–9	Vanuatu	Brisbane, Australia
17:00

18 June 1992	Vanuatu	3–8	Australia	Brisbane, Australia
17:00

19 June 1992	New Zealand	0–3	Australia	Brisbane, Australia
17:00

20 June 1992	Vanuatu	6–4	New Zealand	Brisbane, Australia
17:00

== Champion ==
1992 Oceanian Futsal Championship winners

Australia
First title
