= 1996 Oceanian Futsal Championship =

Tournament details
- Host country: Vanuatu
- Dates: 3–8 August 1996
- Teams: 4 (from 1 confederation)
- Venue: (in 1 host city)

Final positions
- Champions: Australia (2nd title)
- Runners-up: Vanuatu
- Third place: Fiji
- Fourth place: Western Samoa

Tournament statistics
- Matches played: 12
- Goals scored: 138 (11.5 per match)

The 1996 Oceanian Futsal Championship (OFC) was the second edition of the main international futsal tournament of the Oceanian region. It took place from 3 August to 8 August 1996, and was hosted by Port Vila, Vanuatu.

The tournament also acted as a qualifying tournament for the 1996 FIFA Futsal World Championship in Spain. The Australia won the tournament, and qualified for the World Cup.

== Group stage ==
=== Group ===
Team	Pld	W	D	L	GF	GA	GD	Pts
Australia	6	6	0	0	69	8	+61	18
Vanuatu	6	3	1	2	26	21	+5	10
Fiji	6	2	1	3	26	31	-5	7
Western Samoa	6	0	0	6	17	78	-61	0

All time at UTC+11

3 August 1996	Fiji	0–5	Australia	Port Vila, Vanuatu
15:30

3 August 1996	Vanuatu	10–2	Western Samoa	Port Vila, Vanuatu
18:00

4 August 1996	Fiji	1–2	Vanuatu	Port Vila, Vanuatu
15:30

4 August 1996	Western Samoa	1–23	Australia	Port Vila, Vanuatu
18:00

5 August 1996	Australia	4–1	Vanuatu	Port Vila, Vanuatu
15:30

5 August 1996	Western Samoa	2–11	Fiji	Port Vila, Vanuatu
18:00

6 August 1996	Australia	11–1	Fiji	Port Vila, Vanuatu
15:30

6 August 1996	Western Samoa	4–5	Vanuatu	Port Vila, Vanuatu
18:00

7 August 1996	Australia	21–2	Western Samoa	Port Vila, Vanuatu
15:30

7 August 1996	Vanuatu	5–5	Fiji	Port Vila, Vanuatu
18:00

8 August 1996	Fiji	8–6	Western Samoa	Port Vila, Vanuatu
15:30

8 August 1996	Vanuatu	3–5	Australia	Port Vila, Vanuatu
18:00

== Champion ==
1996 Oceanian Futsal Championship winners

Australia
Second title
