= 2023 OFC Futsal Nations Cup =

Tournament details
- Host country: New Zealand
- City: Auckland
- Dates: 1–7 October 2023
- Teams: 8 (from 1 confederation)
- Venue: 1 (in 1 host city)

Final positions
- Champions: New Zealand (2nd title)
- Runners-up: Tahiti
- Third place: Solomon Islands
- Fourth place: Fiji

Tournament statistics
- Matches played: 20
- Goals scored: 181 (9.05 per match)
- Attendance: 3,207 (160 per match)
- Top scorer(s): (Solomon Islands) Micah Lea'alafa (7 goals)
- Best player: (New Zealand) Dylan Manickum
- Best goalkeeper: (New Zealand) Mike Antamanov
- Fair play award: Vanuatu

The 2023 OFC Futsal Nations Cup was the 14th edition of the OFC Futsal Nations Cup (previously called the OFC Futsal Championship), the international futsal championship organised by the Oceania Football Confederation (OFC) for the men's national teams of Oceania. It was held in New Zealand from 1 to 7 October 2023.

New Zealand were the defending champions, after defeating Solomon Islands in the 2022 final.

The winner qualified as the OFC representative at the 2024 FIFA Futsal World Cup in Uzbekistan.

== Teams ==
Eight of the 11 FIFA-affiliated national teams from OFC will enter the tournament.

Team	Appearance	Previous best performance
New Zealand (hosts)	12th	Champions (2022)
Fiji	11th	Runners-up (1999, 2009, 2010)
New Caledonia	10th	Runners-up (2014)
Samoa	5th	Fourth place (1996)
Solomon Islands	10th	Champions (2008, 2009, 2010, 2011, 2016, 2019)
Tahiti	8th	Runners-up (2008, 2011)
Tonga	3rd	Eighth place (2019, 2022)
Vanuatu	14th	Runners-up (1992, 1996)

Did not enter

- American Samoa
- Cook Islands
- Papua New Guinea

== Venue ==
The matches will be played at the Pulman Arena in Auckland.

== Draw ==
The draw took place on 27 July 2023 at the OFC Home Of Football in Auckland, New Zealand.

The eight teams were drawn into two groups of four teams. The top two ranked teams (based on the 2022 OFC Futsal Cup standings.

Pot 1	Pot 2	Pot 3
New Zealand (1); Solomon Islands (2)	New Caledonia (3); Vanuatu (5); Fiji (6); Samoa (7)	Tonga (8); Tahiti (UR)

== Group stage ==
The top two teams of each group advance to the semi-finals. The bottom two teams enter the 5th–8th place play-offs.

All times are local, NZDT (UTC+13).

=== Group A ===
Pos	Team	Pld	W	D	L	GF	GA	GD	Pts	Qualification
1	New Zealand (H)	3	3	0	0	27	5	+22	9	Advance to Knockout stage
2	Fiji	3	2	0	1	13	8	+5	6	Advance to Knockout stage
3	Vanuatu	3	1	0	2	24	10	+14	3	Advance to Placement play-offs
4	Tonga	3	0	0	3	2	43	−41	0	Advance to Placement play-offs

Source: OFC
(H) Hosts
1 October 2023
10:00

Fiji	9–0	Tonga
Khan 7'; Nand 12', 39'; Hughes 17', 25'; Baravilala 20', 22', 37'; Singh 25'	Report

Pulman Arena, Auckland
Attendance: 100
Referee: Rex Kamusu (Solomon Islands)
1 October 2023
16:00

New Zealand	6–3	Vanuatu
Manickum 1'; Ali 8'; Wisnewski 11'; Sharplin 18', 24'; Hawkins 19'	Report	Coulon 27'; Lehi 29'; Donald 36'

Pulman Arena, Auckland
Attendance: 350
Referee: Majid Al Hatmi (Oman)

2 October 2023
10:00

Tonga	2–20	Vanuatu
Kefu 28', 33'	Report	Donald 1', 15'; Timatua 10', 34', 37', 39'; Mesau 17', 34'; Nona 17' (pen.); Coulon 22', 33', 40'; Uhatahi 24' (o.g.); Gete 28', 30'; Mahit 31', 32', 36'; Lehi 35'

Pulman Arena, Auckland
Attendance: 100
Referee: Yahya Alathwani (Saudi Arabia)
2 October 2023
19:00

New Zealand	7–2	Fiji
Martin 5'; Radrigai 6' (o.g.); Ditfort 11', 27'; Ali 21'; Wisnewski 22'; Sharplin 23'	Report	Khan 12'; Waranaivalu 38'

Pulman Arena, Auckland
Attendance: 432
Referee: Jonathon Moore (Australia)

4 October 2023
16:00

Tonga	0–14	New Zealand
	Report	Manickum 2'; Ashby-Peckham 9', 10', 31'; Dittfort 11'; Martin 15', 37'; Twigg 16'; Hawkins 16'; Ali 20', 31'; Paulsen 28', 29'; Otukolo 33' (o.g.)

Pulman Arena, Auckland
Attendance: 180
Referee: Charlemagne Waheo (New Caledonia)
4 October 2023
19:00

Vanuatu	1–2	Fiji
Timatua 31'	Report	Waranaivalu 7'; Hughes 9'

Pulman Arena, Auckland
Attendance: 102
Referee: Rex Kamusu (Solomon Islands)

=== Group B ===
Pos	Team	Pld	W	D	L	GF	GA	GD	Pts	Qualification
1	Tahiti	3	2	1	0	15	8	+7	7	Advance to Knockout stage
2	Solomon Islands	3	1	2	0	20	9	+11	5	Advance to Knockout stage
3	New Caledonia	3	1	1	1	12	9	+3	4	Advance to Placement play-offs
4	Samoa	3	0	0	3	4	25	−21	0	Advance to Placement play-offs

Source: OFC
1 October 2023
13:00

Tahiti	5–0	Samoa
M. Maihuri 16', 35'; Tinomoe 28'; K. Maihuri 29', 33'	Report

Pulman Arena, Auckland
Attendance: 123
Referee: Huynh Thanh (Vietnam)
1 October 2023
19:00

Solomon Islands	2–2	New Caledonia
Lea'alafa 21', 29'	Report	Pei 5'; Hmaen 15'

Pulman Arena, Auckland
Attendance: 135
Referee: Antony Riley (New Zealand)

2 October 2023
13:00

Samoa	2–7	New Caledonia
Tumua Leo 14'; To'o 38'	Report	Foubert 4', 33'; Hmaen 10'; Pei 16'; Ponidja 26', 37'; Boussemart 29'

Pulman Arena, Auckland
Attendance: 105
Referee: Norafendy Norhayalan (Malaysia)
2 October 2023
16:00

Solomon Islands	5–5	Tahiti
Otainao 3'; Lea'alafa 17'; Do'oro 28', 31'; Mana 38'	Report	M.Maihuri 23'; V. Tinomoe 24', 32'; T. Tinomoe 34', 36'

Pulman Arena, Auckland
Attendance: 120
Referee: Chris Sinclair (New Zealand)

4 October 2023
10:00

Samoa	2–13	Solomon Islands
Tumua 30'; Fa'amatau 31'	Report	Stevenson 2', 16'; Mana 3', 34'; Alatina Talilai 4' ((o. g.)); Lea'alafa 9', 10', 20', 23'; Do'oro 21', 37'; Bunabo 25'; Misitana 28'

Pulman Arena, Auckland
Attendance: 100
Referee: Majid Al Hatmi (Oman)
4 October 2022
13:00

New Caledonia	3–5	Tahiti
Foubert 2', 35'; Jiako 5'	Report	V.Tinomoe 4', 21'; T.Tinomoe 9'; M.Maihuri 14'; Riaria 35'

Pulman Arena, Auckland
Attendance: 145
Referee: Antony Riley (New Zealand)

== 5th–8th place play-offs ==
=== Bracket (5th–8th place) ===
Play-off semi-finals
5 October - Auckland
Vanuatu	6
Samoa	3
5 October - Auckland
New Caledonia	11
Tonga	0

Fifth place match
7 October - Auckland
Vanuatu	3
New Caledonia	5
Seventh place match
7 October - Auckland
Samoa	4
Tonga	3

=== Play-off semi-finals ===
5 October 2023
10:00

New Caledonia	11–0	Tonga
Hmaen 8'; Upa 14', 32'; Warekaicane 16'; Ue 17'; Jiako 23', 25', 26'; Foubert 34'; Cawa 38'; Guillemain 39'	Report

Pulman Arena, Auckland
Attendance: 102
Referee: Philip Mana (Solomon Islands)

5 October 2023
13:00

Vanuatu	6–3	Samoa
Timatua 5', 28'; Joseph 9', 32', 33'; Berukilukilu 36'	Report	Taualai 13'; Tumua Leo 13', 38'

Pulman Arena, Auckland
Attendance: 120
Referee: Jonathon Moore

=== Seventh place match ===
7 October 2023
10:00

Tonga	3–4	Samoa
Polovili 5'; Falepapalangi 17'; Manu'olevao 34'	Report	Taualai 6', 29', 39'; Nanumea 31'

Pulman Arena, Auckland
Attendance: 178
Referee: Arnaud Llambrich (New Caledonia)

=== Fifth place match ===
7 October 2023
13:00

New Caledonia	5–3	Vanuatu
Hmaen 16'; Upa 23'; Foubert 25'; Pei 35', 37'	Report	Lehi 3'; Joseph 6'; Mesau 20'

Pulman Arena, Auckland
Attendance: 110
Referee: Norafendy Norhayalan (Malaysia)

== Knockout stage ==
=== Bracket (1st–4th place) ===
Semi-finals
5 October - Auckland
New Zealand	4
Solomon Islands	2
5 October - Auckland
Tahiti	7
Fiji	3

Final
7 October - Auckland
New Zealand	5
Tahiti	0
Third place match
7 October - Auckland
Solomon Islands	5
Fiji	3

=== Semi-finals ===
5 October 2023
16:00

Tahiti	7–3	Fiji
Riaria 6', 12', 17', 37'; T.Tinomoe 31', 38'; Hirihiri 39'	Report	Matanisiga 8'; Radrigai 19'; Baravilala 20'

Pulman Arena, Auckland
Attendance: 300
Referee: Chris Sinclair (New Zealand)

5 October 2023
19:00

New Zealand	4–2	Solomon Islands
Wisnewski 3'; Ashby-Beckham 17'; Sharplin 27'; Atamanov 39'	Report	Otainao 25'; Mana 39'

Pulman Arena, Auckland
Attendance: 550
Referee: Majid Al Hatmi (Oman)

=== Third place match ===
7 October 2023
16:00

Fiji	3–5	Solomon Islands
Hughes 27', 35'; Baravilala 39' (pen.)	Report	Otainao 10'; Mana 15', 36', 37'; Sia 38'

Pulman Arena, Auckland
Attendance: 382
Referee: Antony Riley (New Zealand)

=== Final ===
Winner will qualify for 2024 FIFA Futsal World Cup.

7 October 2023
19:00 NZDT

Tahiti	0–5	New Zealand
	Report	Ashby-Peckham 5'; Ditfort 27'; Picken 28'; Manickum 32'; Grey 38'

Pulman Arena, Auckland
Attendance: 1,300
Referee: Rex Kamusu (Solomon Islands)

Tahiti	New Zealand

GK	14	Puarea Roe
DF	2	Matana Bea
FW	5	Michel Maihuri
FW	7	Akareva Riaria (c)
FW	10	Tetuanui Tinomoe
Substitutes:
GK	1	Maungaroa Angia
	3	Kai'anu Flores
	4	Vincent Tinomoe
	5	Keanu Maihuri
FW	8	Olivier Hirihiri	(yellow card) 27'
	9	Roberto Patira
	11	Scotty Opeta
FW	12	Teivarii Kaiha	(yellow card) 8'
MF	13	Tamati Iotua
Head coach:
Temuri Ariitai

GK	1	Mike Antamanov
DF	8	Logan Wisnewski
FW	6	Rahan Ali
FW	10	Dylan Manickum (c)
FW	11	Jordan Ditfort
Substitutes:
GK	12	Patrick Steele
DF	5	Thomas Picken
DF	7	Ethan Martin
DF	13	Oban Hawkins	(yellow card) 8'
DF	14	Casey Sharplin
FW	2	Adam Paulsen
FW	3	Hamish Grey
FW	4	Art Twigg
FW	9	Stephen Ashby-Peckham	(yellow card) 31'
Head coach:
Marvin Eakins

Man of the Match:
Dylan Manickum (New Zealand)

Second referee:
Jonathon Moore (Australia)
Third referee:
Nicholas Backo (Australia)
Timekeeper:
Majid Al Hatmi (Oman)
Reserve referee:
Philip Mana (Solomon Islands)

Match rules

- 40 minutes.
- 10 minutes of extra time if necessary.
- Penalty shoot-out if scores still level.
- Nine named substitutes.

== Qualified teams for FIFA Futsal World Cup ==
The following team, from OFC, qualified for the 2024 FIFA Futsal World Cup in Uzbekistan.

Team	Qualified on	Previous appearances in FIFA Futsal World Cup
New Zealand	7 October 2023	0 (debut)

== Ranking ==
Rank	Team	M	W	D	L	GF	GA	GD	Points
1	New Zealand	5	5	0	0	36	7	+29	15
2	Tahiti	5	3	1	1	22	16	+6	10
3	Solomon Islands	5	2	2	1	27	16	+11	8
4	Fiji	5	2	0	3	19	20	-1	6
5	New Caledonia	5	3	1	1	28	12	+16	10
6	Vanuatu	5	2	0	3	33	18	+15	6
7	Samoa	5	1	0	4	11	34	−23	3
8	Tonga	5	0	0	5	5	58	−53	0

== Awards ==
The following awards were given at the conclusion of the tournament.

Award	Player
Golden Ball	(New Zealand) Dylan Manickum
Golden Boot	(Solomon Islands) Micah Lea'alafa
Golden Gloves	(New Zealand) Mike Antamanov
Fair Play Award	Vanuatu

== Goalscorers ==
There were 181 goals scored in 20 matches, for an average of 9.05 goals per match.

7 goals

- (Solomon Islands) Micah Lea'alafa

6 goals

- (New Caledonia) Nicolas Foubert
- (Vanuatu) Jayson Timatua

5 goals

- (Fiji) Filipe Baravilala
- (New Zealand) Stephen Ashby-Beckham
- (Solomon Islands) Elis Mana
- (French Polynesia) Akareva Riaria
- (French Polynesia) Tetuanui Tinomoe
- (French Polynesia) Vincent Tinomoe

4 goals

- (Fiji) Bruce Hughes
- (New Caledonia) Emmanuel Hmaen
- (New Caledonia) Anicet Jiako
- (New Caledonia) Christ Pei
- (New Zealand) Rahan Ali
- (New Zealand) Jordan Ditfort
- (New Zealand) Casey Sharplin
- (Samoa) Vaa Taualai
- (Solomon Islands) Calvin Do'oro
- (French Polynesia) Michel Maihuri
- (Vanuatu) Michel Coulon
- (Vanuatu) Keshly Joseph
- (Vanuatu) Kemly Lehi

3 goals

- (New Caledonia) Jymaël Upa
- (New Zealand) Dylan Manickum
- (New Zealand) Ethan Martin
- (New Zealand) Logan Wisnewski
- (Samoa) Michael Tumua Leo
- (Solomon Islands) Charlie Otainao
- (Vanuatu) Kevin Donald
- (Vanuatu) George Mahit
- (Vanuatu) Steve Nona

2 goals

- (Fiji) Ramzan Khan
- (Fiji) Merrill Nand
- (Fiji) Tevita Waranaivalu
- (New Caledonia) Andre Ponidja
- (New Zealand) Oban Hawkins
- (New Zealand) Adam Paulsen
- (Solomon Islands) George Stevenson
- (Solomon Islands) Junior Mana
- (French Polynesia) Keanu Maihuri
- (Tonga) Christopher Kefu
- (Vanuatu) Martin Gete
- (Vanuatu) Sandy Mesau

1 goal

- (Fiji) Setareki Hughes
- (Fiji) Gabiriele Matanisiga
- (Fiji) Dave Radrigai
- (Fiji) Rajneel Singh
- (New Caledonia) Rémi Boussemart
- (New Caledonia) Christopher Cawa
- (New Caledonia) Stevens Guillemain
- (New Caledonia) Ridge Ue
- (New Caledonia) Adolphe Warekaicane
- (New Zealand) Mike Antamanov
- (New Zealand) Hamish Grey
- (New Zealand) Thomas Picken
- (New Zealand) Art Twigg
- (Samoa) Jefferson Fa'amatau
- (Samoa) Falaniko Nanumea
- (Samoa) Tavita To'o
- (Samoa) Dilo Tumua
- (Solomon Islands) Owen Bunabo
- (Solomon Islands) Clifford Misitana
- (Solomon Islands) Marlon Sia
- (French Polynesia) Olivier Hirihiri
- (Tonga) Tevita Falepapalangi
- (Tonga) Maloni Manu'olevao
- (Tonga) Hemaloto Polovili
- (Vanuatu) Yassin Berukilukilu

1 own goal

- (Fiji) Dave Radrigai (against New Zealand)
- (Samoa) Darren Alatina Talilai (against Solomon Islands)
- (Tonga) Semisi Otukolo (against New Zealand)
- (Tonga) Pita Uhatahi (against Vanuatu)
