= 2022 OFC Futsal Cup =

Tournament details
- Host country: Fiji
- City: Suva
- Dates: 13 – 18 September 2022
- Teams: 8 (from 1 confederation)
- Venue: 1 (in 1 host city)

Final positions
- Champions: New Zealand (1st title)
- Runners-up: Solomon Islands
- Third place: New Caledonia
- Fourth place: FFA President's Five

Tournament statistics
- Matches played: 20
- Goals scored: 181 (9.05 per match)
- Top scorer(s): (New Zealand) Rahan Ali (Vanuatu) Rhydley Napau (8 goals)
- Best player: (New Zealand) Rahan Ali
- Best goalkeeper: (New Zealand) Mike Antamanov
- Fair play award: Samoa

The 2022 OFC Futsal Cup was the 13th edition of the OFC Futsal Nations Cup (previously called the OFC Futsal Championship), the international futsal championship organised by the Oceania Football Confederation (OFC) for the men's national teams of Oceania.

Solomon Islands were the defending champions, after defeating New Zealand in the 2019 final.

New Zealand took revenge on Solomon Islands by defeating them 6–2 in the final and winning the 2022 edition.

== Teams ==
Seven of the 11 FIFA-affiliated national teams from OFC entered the tournament. Fiji Football Association were invited to enter a second team to ensure an even number of teams were participating.

Team	Appearance	Previous best performance
Fiji (hosts)	10th	Runners-up (2000, 2009, 2010)
FFA President's Five	1st	Debut
New Caledonia	9th	Runners-up (2014)
New Zealand	11th	Runners-up (2004, 2016, 2019)
Samoa	4th	4th (1996)
Solomon Islands	9th	Champions (2008, 2009, 2010, 2011, 2016, 2019)
Tonga	2nd	8th (2019)
Vanuatu	13th	Runners-up (1992, 1996)

Did not enter

- American Samoa
- Cook Islands
- Tahiti
- Papua New Guinea

== Venue ==
The matches were played at the Vodafone Arena in Suva.

== Draw ==
The draw of the tournament was held on 5 September 2022 at the OFC Home of Football in Auckland, New Zealand. The eight teams were drawn into two groups of four teams. The top two ranked teams (based on the 2019 OFC Futsal Nations Cup standings, Solomon Islands and New Zealand, were drawn into position 1 of Group A or B, and the bottom two ranked teams, FFA Presidents Five and Samoa, were drawn into position 4 of Group A or B, while the remaining teams were drawn into position 2 or 3 of Group A or B. Fiji and FFA Presidents Five were ineligible to be drawn into the same group.

Pot 1	Pot 2	Pot 3
Solomon Islands (1); New Zealand (2)	New Caledonia (3); Fiji (4); Vanuatu (5); Tonga (8)	Samoa (UR); FFA President's Five (UR)

== Group stage ==
The top two teams of each group advance to the semi-finals. The bottom two teams enter the 5th–8th place play-offs.

All times are local, FJT (UTC+12).

=== Group A ===
Pos	Team	Pld	W	D	L	GF	GA	GD	Pts	Qualification
1	New Zealand	3	2	1	0	21	3	+18	7	Knockout stage
2	FFA President's Five	3	2	0	1	13	7	+6	6	Knockout stage
3	Vanuatu	3	1	1	1	12	4	+8	4	5th–8th place play-offs
4	Tonga	3	0	0	3	1	33	−32	0	5th–8th place play-offs

Source: OFC
13 September 2022
15:30

FFA President's Five (Fiji)	1–5	New Zealand
Pal 8'	Report	McIntee 2'; Ali 18', 33'; Grey 32'; Ditfort 35'

Vodafone Arena, Suva
Referee: Rex Kamusu (Solomon Islands)
13 September 2022
18:00

Tonga	0–9	Vanuatu
	Report	Sopuso 3'; Napau 6', 19'; Donald 10', 30'; Lehi 11'; Tamuri 23'; Mesau 25', 26'

Vodafone Arena, Suva
Referee: Dharmend Chand (Fiji)

14 September 2022
13:00

FFA President's Five (Fiji)	9–0	Tonga
P.Chand 2'; Prasad 3'; Lal 5', 24'; Ni.Chand 16'; Pal 16', 21'; Naidu 18'; Ayman 34'	Report

Vodafone Arena, Suva
Referee: Francis Roni (Solomon Islands)
14 September 2022
18:00

New Zealand	1–1	Vanuatu
Ali 18'	Report	Napau 30'

Vodafone Arena, Suva
Referee: Arnaud Llambrich (New Caledonia)

16 September 2022
13:00

Vanuatu	2–3	FFA President's Five
Donald 9'; Napau 29'	Report	Naidu 1'; Pal 6'; Ram 20'

Vodafone Arena, Suva
Referee: Philip Mana (Solomon Islands)
16 September 2022
15:30

New Zealand	15–1	Tonga
Hawkins 0', 20'; Grey 5'; Ali 12', 31'; Martin 19', 26', 35', 38'; Ashby-Peckham 20'; Paulsen 24', 33'; McIntee 27'; Wisnewski 31'; Sharplin 37'	Report	Muavesi 28'

Vodafone Arena, Suva
Referee: Jimmy Malap (Vanuatu)

=== Group B ===
Pos	Team	Pld	W	D	L	GF	GA	GD	Pts	Qualification
1	Solomon Islands	3	2	1	0	26	13	+13	7	Knockout stage
2	New Caledonia	3	2	0	1	14	13	+1	6	Knockout stage
3	Fiji (H)	3	1	1	1	15	10	+5	4	5th–8th place play-offs
4	Samoa	3	0	0	3	6	25	−19	0	5th–8th place play-offs

Source: OFC
(H) Hosts
13 September 2022
20:30

New Caledonia	4–2	Fiji
Qenegeie 27', 28', 31'; Hmaen 36'	Report	Khan 4'; Nand 28'

Vodafone Arena, Suva
Referee: Chris Sinclair (New Zealand)
15 September 2022
18:00

Samoa	4–11	Solomon Islands
Maiava 5'; Tumua 9', 21'; Tavita To'o 15'	Report	Misitana 8', 12', 29', 36'; E.Mana 12', 36'; Bule 21'; Rukumana 23'; Lalo 28'; Sia 33'; J.Mana 34'

Vodafone Arena, Suva
Referee: Nicholas Backo (Australia)

14 September 2022
15:30

Solomon Islands	9–3	New Caledonia
J.Mana 2', 33'; B.Mana 9'; Longue 12' (o.g.); Rukumana 22'; Kasute'e 25', 34'; Sia 36'; E.Mana 37'	Report	Qenegeie 8', 22'; Hmaen 21'

Vodafone Arena, Suva
Referee: Jonathan Moore (Australia)
14 September 2022
20:30

Fiji	7–0	Samoa
Sami 1', 2', 36'; Dave 3', 5', 21'; R. Singh 6'	Report

Vodafone Arena, Suva
Referee: Antony Riley (New Zealand)

16 September 2022
10:30

Samoa	2–7	New Caledonia
Nanumea 12'; Tavita To'o 33'	Report	Longue 4', 16'; Hmaen 8', 29'; Ue 14', 33'; Lalie 33'

Vodafone Arena, Suva
Referee: Dom Barry (New Zealand)
16 September 2022
18:00

Solomon Islands	6–6	Fiji
Rukumana 4', 5'; Bule 7'; Kasute'e 7'; Sia 26'; Misitana 32'	Report	Sami 3'; Laki 8' (o.g.); Khan 11'; Nand 28'; Baravilala 33'; Dave 38'

Vodafone Arena, Suva
Referee: Ben Norman (New Zealand)

== 5th–8th place play-offs ==
=== Bracket (5th–8th place) ===
Play-off semi-finals
17 September – Suva
Vanuatu	11
Samoa	6
17 September – Suva
Fiji	8
Tonga	1

Fifth place match
18 September – Suva
Vanuatu	4
Fiji	3
Seventh place match
18 September – Suva
Samoa	6
Tonga	5

=== Play-off semi-finals ===
17 September 2022
13:00

Vanuatu	11–6	Samoa
Donald 4', 36'; Tabeva 6', 8'; Coulon 7'; Alick 7'; Napau 24', 25'; Mesau 27', 32'; Sopuso 29'	Report	Saofaiga 8'; Nanumea 12', 13'; Alatina Talilai 16'; Malo 20'; Taualai 21'

Vodafone Arena, Suva
Referee: Nicholas Backo (Australia)

17 September 2022
15:30

Fiji	8–1	Tonga
Tuifangaloka 2' (o.g.); R. Singh 14', 28'; Sami 27', 29'; Nadan 33'; Na.Chand 35', 36'	Report	Atoa 15'

Vodafone Arena, Suva
Referee: Arnaud Llambrich (New Caledonia)

=== Seventh place match ===
18 September 2022
10:30

Samoa	6–5	Tonga
Nanumea 7', 20'; Maiava 24'; Tumua 27', 29'; Alatina Talilai 33'	Report	Tokotaha 8'; Tuifangaloka 11', 31'; Falepapalangi 16', 18'

Vodafone Arena, Suva
Referee: Rex Kamusu (Solomon Islands)

=== Fifth place match ===
18 September 2022
13:00

Vanuatu	4–3	Fiji
Alick 17'; Tamuri 29'; Napau 32', 35'	Report	Sami 13'; Dave 34'; Baravilala 35'

Vodafone Arena, Suva
Referee: Antony Riley (New Zealand)

== Knockout stage ==
=== Bracket (1st–4th place) ===
Semi-finals
17 September - Suva
New Zealand	6
New Caledonia	1
17 September - Suva
Solomon Islands	5
FFA President's Five	1

Final
18 September - Suva
New Zealand	6
Solomon Islands	2
Third place match
18 September - Suva
New Caledonia	5
FFA President's Five	3

=== Semi-finals ===
17 September 2022
18:00

New Zealand	6–1	New Caledonia
Lalie 15' (o.g.); Wisnewski 21'; Ditfort 23'; Martin 32'; Grey 38'; Qenegeie 38' (o.g.)	Report	Hmaen 28'

Vodafone Arena, Suva
Referee: Jonathan Moore (Australia)

17 September 2022
20:30

Solomon Islands	5–1	FFA President's Five
Kasute'e 5'; Maeluma 14'; Misitana 28'; B. Mana 32'; Lalo 32'	Report	Lal 19'

Vodafone Arena, Suva
Referee: Chris Sinclair (New Zealand)

=== Third place match ===
18 September 2022
15:30

New Caledonia	5–3	FFA President's Five
Halune 0'; Wright 8', 30'; Qenegeie 27'; Hmaen 38'	Report	Pal 2', 12'; Naidu 26'

Vodafone Arena, Suva
Referee: Chris Sinclair (New Zealand)

=== Final ===
18 September 2022
18:00

New Zealand	6–2	Solomon Islands
Ditfort 2'; Ali 7', 30', 31'; Martin 12'; Ashby-Peckham 39'	Report	Sia 6'; B. Mana 31'

Vodafone Arena, Suva
Referee: Jonathan Moore (Australia)

== Awards ==
The following awards were given at the conclusion of the tournament.

Award	Player
Golden Ball	(New Zealand) Rahan Ali
Golden Boot	(New Zealand) Rahan Ali
Golden Gloves	(New Zealand) Mike Antamanov
Fair Play Award	Samoa

== Match officials ==
Referees

- (Australia) Nicholas Backo
- (Australia) Jonathan Moore
- (Fiji) Dharmend Chand
- (New Caledonia) Arnaud Llambrich
- (New Zealand) Dom Barry
- (New Zealand) Ben Norman
- (New Zealand) Antony Riley
- (New Zealand) Chris Sinclair
- (Solomon Islands) Rex Kamusu
- (Solomon Islands) Philip Mana
- (Solomon Islands) Francis Roni
- (Vanuatu) Jimmy Malap

== Goalscorers ==
There were 181 goals scored in 20 matches, for an average of 9.05 goals per match.

8 goals

- (New Zealand) Rahan Ali
- (Vanuatu) Rhydley Napau

7 goals

- (Fiji) Surjason Sami

6 goals

- (Fiji) Rayneel Pal
- (New Caledonia) Emmanuel Hmaen
- (New Caledonia) Uge Ferdinand Qenegeie
- (New Zealand) Ethan Martin
- (Solomon Islands) Clifford Misitana

5 goals

- (Fiji) Shahil Dave
- (Samoa) Falaniko Nanumea
- (Vanuatu) Kevin Donald

4 goals

- (Samoa) Dilo Tumua
- (Solomon Islands) Franster Rukumana
- (Vanuatu) Sandy Mesau
