= Tonga national futsal team =

Tonga
- Association: Tonga Football Association
- Confederation: OFC
- Head coach: Manula’aina Tu’alau
- Captain: Sione Tu’ifangaloka
- Top scorer: Laulea Taufa (3)
- Home stadium: ‘Atele Indoor Stadium
- FIFA code: TGA
- FIFA ranking: 137 ▼2 (8 May 2026)

First international
- Solomon Islands 13–2 Tonga (Païta, New Caledonia; 29 October 2019)

Biggest win
- None

Biggest defeat
- Tahiti 24–2 Tonga (Païta, New Caledonia; 30 October 2019)

The Tonga national futsal team represents Tonga in international futsal under the auspices of the Tonga Football Association.

== History ==
Futsal was first introduced in Tonga in 2014. The nation fielded its first-ever men's national side to participate in the 2019 OFC Futsal Nations Cup. In advance of the tournament, Manulaaina Tu’alau was named the team's first-ever head coach. In the team's first-ever official match, it lost 2–13 to the Solomon Islands. In the match, Soakai Vea scored Tonga's first-ever goal. Following the group stage, the team had to forfeit its knock-out round matches because of a measles outbreak in the squad.

== Tournament records ==
=== FIFA Futsal World Cup ===
FIFA Futsal World Cup
Year	Round	Position	Pld	W	D	L	GS	GA
(Netherlands) 1989	Did not enter							
(Hong Kong) 1992	Did not enter							
(Spain) 1996	Did not enter							
(Guatemala) 2000	Did not enter							
(Chinese Taipei) 2004	Did not enter							
(Brazil) 2008	Did not enter							
(Thailand) 2012	Did not enter							
(Colombia) 2016	Did not enter							
(Lithuania) 2021	Did not qualify							
(Uzbekistan) 2024	Did not qualify							
Total	–	0/10	-	-	-	-	-	-

=== OFC Futsal Nations Cup ===
OFC Futsal Nations Cup
Year	Round	Position	Pld	W	D*	L	GF	GA
(Australia) 1992	Did not enter							
(Vanuatu) 1996	Did not enter							
(Vanuatu) 1999	Did not enter							
(Australia) 2004	Did not enter							
(Fiji) 2008	Did not enter							
(Fiji) 2009	Did not enter							
(Fiji) 2010	Did not enter							
(Fiji) 2011	Did not enter							
(New Zealand) 2013	Did not enter							
(New Caledonia) 2014	Did not enter							
(Fiji) 2016	Did not enter							
(New Caledonia) 2019	Group Stage	8th	3	0	0	3	6	46
(Fiji) 2022	Group Stage	8th	5	0	0	5	7	47
(New Zealand) 2023	Group Stage	8th	5	0	0	5	5	58
Total	0 titles	3/14	13	0	0	13	18	151

== All-time fixtures and results ==
=== 2019 OFC Futsal Nations Cup ===
28 October 2019 2019 OFC Futsal Nations Cup	Tonga	2–13	Solomon Islands	Païta, New Caledonia
13:00	Ateneo Feao 29'; Soakai Vea 29'	Report		Stadium: L'Arène du Sud

29 October 2019 2019 OFC Futsal Nations Cup	Tonga	2–9	Fiji	Païta, New Caledonia
15:00	Laulea Taufa 32', 39'	Report		Stadium: L'Arène du Sud

30 October 2019 2019 OFC Futsal Nations Cup	Tahiti	24–2	Tonga	Païta, New Caledonia
13:00		Report	Laulea Taufa 20'; Sione Aho 24'	Stadium: L'Arène du Sud

=== 2022 OFC Futsal Nations Cup ===
13 September 2022 2022 OFC Futsal Nations Cup	Tonga	0–9	Vanuatu	Suva, Fiji
18:00		Report		Stadium: Vodafone Arena; Referee: Dharmend Chand (Fiji)

14 September 2022 2022 OFC Futsal Nations Cup	FFA President's Five (Fiji)	9–0	Tonga	Suva, Fiji
13:00		Report		Stadium: Vodafone Arena; Referee: Francis Roni (Solomon Islands)

16 September 2022 2022 OFC Futsal Nations Cup	New Zealand	15–1	Tonga	Suva, Fiji
15:30		Report	Joseph Muavesi 28'	Stadium: Vodafone Arena; Referee: Jimmy Malap (Vanuatu)

17 September 2022 2022 OFC Futsal Nations Cup	Fiji	8–1	Tonga	Suva, Fiji
15:30		Report	Lachman Atoa 15'	Stadium: Vodafone Arena; Referee: Arnaud Llambrich (New Caledonia)

18 September 2022 2022 OFC Futsal Nations Cup	Samoa	6–5	Tonga	Suva, Fiji
10:30		Report	Petueli Tokotaha 8'; Sione Tuifangaloka 11', 31'; Tuia Falepapalangi 16', 18'	Stadium: Vodafone Arena; Referee: Rex Kamusu (Solomon Islands)

=== 2023 OFC Futsal Nations Cup ===
1 October 2023 2023 OFC Futsal Nations Cup	Fiji	9–0	Tonga	Auckland, New Zealand
10:00		Report		Stadium: Pulman Arena; Attendance: 100; Referee: Rex Kamusu (Solomon Islands)

2 October 2023 2023 OFC Futsal Nations Cup	Tonga	2–20	Vanuatu	Auckland, New Zealand
10:00	Christopher Kefu 28', 33'	Report		Stadium: Pulman Arena; Attendance: 100; Referee: Yahya Alathwani (Saudi Arabia)

4 October 2023 2023 OFC Futsal Nations Cup	Tonga	0–14	New Zealand	Auckland, New Zealand
16:00		Report		Stadium: Pulman Arena; Attendance: 180; Referee: Charlemagne Waheo (New Caledonia)

5 October 2023 2023 OFC Futsal Nations Cup	New Caledonia	11–0	Tonga	Auckland, New Zealand
10:00		Report		Stadium: Pulman Arena; Attendance: 102; Referee: Philip Mana (Solomon Islands)

7 October 2023 2023 OFC Futsal Nations Cup	Tonga	3–4	Samoa	Auckland, New Zealand
10:00	Hemaloto Polovili 5'; Tevita Falepapalangi 17'; Maloni Manu'olevao 34'	Report		Stadium: Pulman Arena; Attendance: 178; Referee: Arnaud Llambrich (New Caledonia)

== Current squad ==
The following players were called up for the 2023 OFC Futsal Nations Cup.

- Semisi ‘Otukolo
- Vai Lutu
- Kulisi Kefu
- ‘Unaloto ‘Aho
- Pita ‘Uhatahi
- Sione Tu’ifangaloka (C)
- Timote Fakasi’i’eiki
- Maloni Manuolevao
- ‘Atieli ‘Aho
- Hemaloto Polovili
- Tevita Falepapalangi
- Sitaleki Fisi
- ‘Uhila Tautua’a
- Viliami Falevai

== All-time record ==
Key

- Pld = Matches played
- W = Matches won
- D = Matches drawn
- L = Matches lost
- GF = Goals for
- GA = Goals against
- GD = Goal differential
- Countries are listed in alphabetical order

As of match played 7 October 2023

Team	Pld	W	D	L	GF	GA	GD	WPCT
Fiji	3	0	0	3	3	26	−23	0.00
Fiji President's Five	1	0	0	1	0	9	−9	0.00
New Caledonia	1	0	0	1	0	11	−11	0.00
New Zealand	2	0	0	2	1	29	−28	0.00
Samoa	2	0	0	2	8	10	−2	0.00
Solomon Islands	1	0	0	1	2	13	−11	0.00
Tahiti	1	0	0	1	2	24	−22	0.00
Vanuatu	2	0	0	2	2	29	−27	0.00
Total	13	0	0	13	18	151	−133	0.00

Source: Results

== See also ==
- Tonga national football team
