= 2022 OFC Futsal Cup squads =

The following lists are the squad list for the 2022 OFC Futsal Cup. For the 2022 OFC Futsal Cup, the 8 participating national teams must submit squads of at least 12 players – of which 1 must be a goalkeeper.

The squads for the tournament were announced by Oceania Football Confederation on the 9 September 2022.

== Group A ==
=== FFA President's Five ===
Head coach: Vivek Nadan

| No. | Pos. | Player | Date of birth (age) | Club |
|---|---|---|---|---|
| 1 | GK | Nemesh Ram | 1 September 1998 (aged 24) | |
| 2 | DF | Aman Naidu | 21 March 1995 (aged 27) | |
| 3 | DF | Kalisito Veikoka | 27 August 1995 (aged 27) | |
| 4 | FW | Malakai Lavecake | 25 February 2004 (aged 18) | |
| 5 | DF | Prashant Chand | 8 September 1999 (aged 23) | |
| 6 | DF | Rynal Chand | 8 October 2003 (aged 18) | |
| 7 | MF | Mohammed Ayman | 9 June 2005 (aged 17) | |
| 8 | FW | Arav Nadan | 31 July 2004 (aged 18) | |
| 9 | FW | Ravneel Pal | 7 February 1996 (aged 26) | |
| 10 | MF | Nikil Chand | 14 September 2000 (aged 21) | |
| 11 | MF | Vineet Kumar | 12 March 1999 (aged 23) | |
| 12 | MF | Shivnal Prasad | 20 January 1999 (aged 23) | |
| 13 | MF | Kavinesh Lal | 8 December 2000 (aged 21) | |
| 14 | MF | Kitione Baleloa | 29 July 1991 (aged 31) | |

=== New Zealand ===
Head coach: Marvin Eakins

New Zealand's 14 man squad announced on 7 September 2022.

| No. | Pos. | Player | Date of birth (age) | Club |
|---|---|---|---|---|
| 1 | GK | Mike Antamanov | 27 April 1987 (aged 35) | (New Zealand Football) Auckland City FC Futsal |
| 2 | FW | Sean McIntee | 2 December 1991 (aged 30) | (New Zealand Football) Auckland City FC Futsal |
| 3 | MF | Yousif Al-Kalisy | 25 September 1997 (aged 24) | (New Zealand Football) Auckland City FC Futsal |
| 4 | MF | Denny Twigg | 17 September 1999 (aged 22) | (New Zealand Football) Northern Comets |
| 5 | MF | Adam Paulsen | 2 June 2001 (aged 21) | (New Zealand Football) Auckland City FC Futsal |
| 6 | FW | Rahan Ali | 3 April 1997 (aged 25) | (New Zealand Football) Southern United Futsal |
| 7 | DF | Ethan Martin | 11 January 2000 (aged 22) | (New Zealand Football) Waikato Rapids |
| 8 | DF | Logan Wisnewski | 16 November 2000 (aged 21) | (New Zealand Football) Waikato Rapids |
| 9 | MF | Stephen Ashby-Peckham | 9 April 1995 (aged 27) | (New Zealand Football) Auckland City FC Futsal |
| 10 | MF | Oban Hawkins | 6 October 2000 (aged 21) | (New Zealand Football) Northern Comets |
| 11 | MF | Jordi Ditfort | 9 June 1998 (aged 24) | (New Zealand Football) Waikato Rapids |
| 12 | GK | Patrick Steele | 14 November 2000 (aged 21) | (New Zealand Football) Waikato Rapids |
| 13 | MF | Hamish Grey | 6 April 2002 (aged 20) | (Italian Football Federation) ASD Isola 5 |
| 14 | MF | Casey Sharplin | 26 August 2001 (aged 21) | (New Zealand Football) Waikato Rapids |

=== Tonga ===
Head coach: Manu Tualau

=== Vanuatu ===
Head coach: Ben Hungai

== Group B ==
=== Fiji ===
Head coach: (Solomon Islands) Jerry Sam

=== New Caledonia ===
Head coach: Andre Hnawang

=== Samoa ===
Head coach: Taumateina Tugaga

=== Solomon Islands ===
Head coach: Francis Lafai
