= American Samoa national futsal team =

American Samoa
- Shirt badge/Association crest
- Association: Football Federation American Samoa (FFAS)
- Confederation: OFC (Oceania)
- Head coach: Tunoa Lui
- Top scorer: Austin Kaleopa (2)
- FIFA code: ASA
- FIFA ranking: 114 ▲1 (4 April 2025)
Home colors	Away colors

First international
- American Samoa 0–9 New Zealand; Païta, New Caledonia, 28 October 2019)

Biggest win
- None

Biggest defeat
- American Samoa 0–9 New Zealand (Païta, New Caledonia, 28 October 2019); American Samoa 0–9 New Caledonia (Païta, New Caledonia, 29 October 2019)

FIFA World Cup
- Appearances: 0

OFC Futsal Championship
- Appearances: 1 (First in 2019 OFC Futsal Nations Cup)
- Best result: Group stage (2019)

The American Samoa national futsal team represents American Samoa in international futsal. It is controlled by Football Federation American Samoa (FFAS), the governing body of soccer in American Samoa. The team played the OFC Futsal Championship for the first time in 2019, losing all three group matches and play-off semi-final.

== Competitive record ==
=== FIFA Futsal World Cup ===
FIFA World Cup Record
Year	Round	Pld	W	D	L	GS	GA
Netherlands 1989	Did not enter	-	-	-	-	-	-
Hong Kong 1992	Did not enter	-	-	-	-	-	-
Spain 1996	Did not qualify	-	-	-	-	-	-
Guatemala 2000	Did not qualify	-	-	-	-	-	-
Taiwan 2004	Did not qualify	-	-	-	-	-	-
Brazil 2008	Did not qualify	-	-	-	-	-	-
Thailand 2012	Did not qualify	-	-	-	-	-	-
Colombia 2016	Did not qualify	-	-	-	-	-	-
Lithuania 2020	Did not qualify						
Total	0/9	-	-	-	-	-	-

=== OFC Futsal Championship ===
Oceanian Futsal Championship record
Year	Round	Pld	W	D	L	GS	GA
(Australia) 1992	Did not enter						
(Vanuatu) 1996	Did not enter						
(Vanuatu) 1999	Did not enter						
(Australia) 2004	Did not enter						
(Fiji) 2008	Did not enter						
(Fiji) 2009	Did not enter						
(Fiji) 2010	Did not enter						
(Fiji) 2011	Did not enter						
(New Zealand) 2013	Did not enter						
(New Caledonia) 2014	Did not enter						
(Fiji) 2016	Did not enter						
(New Caledonia) 2019	Seventh Place	5	1	0	4	8	34
Total	Seventh Place	5	1	0	4	8	34

== Results and fixtures ==
Win Draw Loss Fixture

=== 2019 ===
28 October 2019 2019 OFC Futsal Nations Cup Group A	American Samoa	0–9	New Zealand	Païta, New Caledonia
15:00 UTC+11		Report	Malivuk 0'; Manickum 1', 12', 36'; Margetts 19'; Eakins 20'; Ashby-Peckham 35', 36'	Stadium: L'Arène du Sud; Attendance: 150; Referee: Philip Mana (Solomon Islands)

29 October 2019 2019 OFC Futsal Nations Cup Group A	American Samoa	0–9	New Caledonia	Païta, New Caledonia
19:00 UTC+11		Report	Humuni 5' (pen.), 25'; Sele 7', 37'; Delaunay 22', 29'; Qenegeie 33'; Xuma 37'; Guitton 39'	Stadium: L'Arène du Sud; Attendance: 250; Referee: Francis Roni (Solomon Islands)

30 October 2019 2019 OFC Futsal Nations Cup Group A	Vanuatu	10–3	American Samoa	Païta, New Caledonia
15:00 UTC+11	Wilkins 4', 5'; Alick 6', 30'; Mesau 9', 30', 38'; Vano 18'; Napau 24'; Soromon 29'	Report	Taumua 22' (pen.); Pouli 25'; Kaleopa 32'	Stadium: L'Arène du Sud; Attendance: 250; Referee: Teraimaeva Make (Tahiti)

1 November 2019 2019 OFC Futsal Nations Cup Play-off semi-finals	Fiji	6–2	American Samoa	Païta, New Caledonia
11:30 UTC+11	Verevou 14', 34'; Dave 32'; Baravilala 35'	Report	Kaleopa 18'; Tualaulelei 37'	Stadium: L'Arène du Sud; Attendance: 60; Referee: Charlemagne Waheo (New Caledonia)
