= 2019 OFC Futsal Nations Cup squads =

The following lists are the squad list for the 2019 OFC Futsal Nations Cup. For the 2019 OFC Futsal Nations Cup, the 8 participating national teams must submit squads of 12 players – of which 2 must be goalkeepers.

== Squads ==
=== American Samoa ===
Head coach: (Samoa) Tunoa Lui

No.	Pos.	Player	Date of birth (age)	Caps	Club
1	GK	Nicky Salapu	13 September 1980 (age 44)		
2	DF	Gabriel Taumua	13 April 2002 (age 22)		(American Samoa) Pago Youth
3	DF	Ueli Tualaulelei	27 August 1999 (age 25)		(American Samoa) Pago Youth
4	FW	Chris Faamoana	2 August 2001 (age 23)		(American Samoa) Vaiala Tongan
5	MF	Austin Kaleopa	24 August 2001 (age 23)		(American Samoa) Utulei Youth
6	DF	Joseph Collins	20 February 2002 (age 23)		(American Samoa) Pago Youth
7	MF	Alatina Vaialii	12 February 1991 (age 34)		(American Samoa) Royal Puma
8		Tea Siatuu			
9		Malu Faavae			
10	DF	Gogo Poasa	7 December 2002 (age 22)		(American Samoa) Vaiala Tongan
11	MF	Takai Pouli	19 July 2000 (age 24)		(American Samoa) Vaiala Tongan
20	GK	Hengihengi Ikuvalu	2 December 2002 (age 22)		(American Samoa) Vaiala Tongan
	DF	Paneta Lote	21 May 2002 (age 22)		(American Samoa) Pago Youth
	MF	Roy Ledoux	26 June 2000 (age 24)		(American Samoa) Pago Youth
	FW	Shane Ah Hing	29 January 1992 (age 33)		(American Samoa) Ilaoa and To'omata
	MF	Rangie Lealuga	20 December 2002 (age 22)		(American Samoa) Pago Youth

=== Fiji ===
Head coach: Mira Sahib

=== New Caledonia ===
Head coach: (Brazil) Juliano Schmeling

=== New Zealand ===
Head coach:

=== Solomon Islands ===
Head coach: (Brazil) Vinicius De Carvalho Leite

No.	Pos.	Player	Date of birth (age)	Caps	Club
	GK	Paul Laki	25 July 1995 (age 29)		(Solomon Islands) Marist
	GK	Charlie Ata	12 December 2000 (age 24)		(Solomon Islands) Solympics
		Samuel Osifelo	15 May 1991 (age 33)		(Solomon Islands) Kossa
		Coleman Makau	25 November 1992 (age 32)		(Solomon Islands) Kooline
		Edward Kasute'e	2 February 1992 (age 33)		(Solomon Islands) Kossa
		Arnold Maeluma			(Solomon Islands) Marist
		Jeffery Bule	15 November 1991 (age 33)		(Solomon Islands) Marist
		George Stevenson	7 February 1992 (age 33)		(Solomon Islands) Kooline
		Elis Mana	9 March 2000 (age 25)		(Solomon Islands) Guntimak
		Marlon Sia	19 July 1999 (age 25)		(Solomon Islands) Mataks
		Charlie Otainao	5 June 1992 (age 32)		(Solomon Islands) Kossa
		Elliot Ragomo	28 May 1990 (age 34)		(Solomon Islands) Marist

=== Tahiti ===
Head coach: Jean-Baptiste Barsinas

=== Tonga ===
Head coach: Manu Tu'alau

=== Vanuatu ===
Head coach: Richard Lehi
