= Cook Islands national futsal team =

Cook Islands
- Shirt badge/Association crest
- Association: Cook Islands Football Association
- Confederation: Oceania Football Confederation (Oceania)
- FIFA code: COK
- FIFA ranking: NR (12 December 2025)
Home colours	Away colours

First international
- New Zealand 3–2 Cook Islands (Port Vila, Vanuatu, 21 August 1999)

Biggest win
- None

Biggest defeat
- Cook Islands 0–5 Vanuatu (Port Vila, Vanuatu, 24 August 1999); Australia 5–0 Cook Islands (Port Vila, Vanuatu, 27 August 1999); Papua New Guinea 5–0 Cook Islands (Port Vila, Vanuatu, 28 August 1999)

FIFA World Cup
- Appearances: 0

Oceanian Futsal Championship
- Appearances: 1 (First in 1999)
- Best result: 7th place, (1999)

The Cook Islands national futsal team is the representative team for the Cook Islands in international futsal competitions. It is controlled by the Cook Islands Football Association.

== Tournament records ==
=== FIFA World Cup ===
FIFA World Cup Record
Year	Round	Pld	W	D	L	GS	GA
Guatemala 2000	Did not qualify	-	-	-	-	-	-
Taiwan 2004	Did not enter	-	-	-	-	-	-
Brazil 2008	Did not enter	-	-	-	-	-	-
Thailand 2012	Did not enter	-	-	-	-	-	-
Colombia 2016	Did not enter	-	-	-	-	-	-
Lithuania 2021	Did not qualify	-	-	-	-	-	-
Uzbekistan 2024	Did not enter						
Total	0/7	-	-	-	-	-	-

=== Oceanian Futsal Championship record ===
OFC Futsal Nations Cup record
Year	Round	Pld	W	D	L	GS	GA
(Australia) 1992	Did not enter						
(Vanuatu) 1996	Did not enter						
(Vanuatu) 1999	Seventh place	6	0	0	6	6	27
(Australia) 2004	Did not enter						
(Fiji) 2008	Did not enter						
(Fiji) 2009	Did not enter						
(Fiji) 2010	Did not enter						
(Fiji) 2011	Did not enter						
(New Zealand) 2013	Did not enter						
(New Caledonia) 2014	Did not enter						
(Fiji) 2016	Did not enter						
(New Caledonia) 2019	Did not enter						
Total	1/9	6	0	0	6	6	27
