= Football at the 2010 Summer Youth Olympics – Boys' tournament =

2010 Boys' Youth Olympic Football Tournament

Tournament details
- Host country: Singapore
- Dates: 13–25 August 2010 (12 days)
- Teams: 6 (from 6 confederations)
- Venue: 1 (in 1 host city)

Final positions
- Champions: Bolivia (1st title)
- Runners-up: Haiti
- Third place: Singapore
- Fourth place: Montenegro

Tournament statistics
- Matches played: 11
- Goals scored: 44 (4 per match)
- Attendance: 37,084 (3,371 per match)
- Top scorer(s): (Bolivia) Rodrigo Mejido (6 goals)

The boys' football tournament at the 2010 Summer Youth Olympics took place at the Jalan Besar Stadium in Singapore.

== Medalists ==
Gold	Silver	Bronze
Bolivia	Haiti	Singapore

== Participants ==
=== Africa ===
Zimbabwe represented Africa at the tournament. The U-15 team is made up of players from various schools in the country's ten provinces, with the squad spending six months training together in the build-up to the Singapore 2010. During the process they played five tune-up games against local youth sides, racking up 39 goals in the process at an average of nearly eight goals per game. The team went through five week-long camps over a three-month period, also playing friendlies against local club sides and school teams before arriving in Singapore. Their two most recent results were a 5–0 win over local club Dynamos FC and a 3–1 victory over Gunnas FC.

=== Asia ===
Singapore represented Asia at the tournament. As hosts, they automatically qualified for the tournament. Kadir Yahaya, a former Singapore international who took over in February, guided the Young Lions. Under the 44-year-old, the youth side have spent several months in the build-up to the tournament in training camps at home and abroad, making them one of the competition's best-prepared teams. A short trip to Melbourne in March was followed by another two-week camp in May in England, during which Yahaya's outfits won two of their five games against some local age-group teams, with the highlight a 3–2 victory over a Tottenham Hotspur academy team.

=== Europe ===
Montenegro represented Europe at the tournament. UEFA decided that the four lowest-ranked associations at junior level would fight out for a place at the Youth Olympics. Montenegro overwhelmed San Marino 4–0 to book a meeting with Albania for the right to represent Europe in Singapore. At this match, the Montenegrin goalkeeper extinguished an attack by handling the ball outside his penalty area. He was consequently sent off. Albania had the majority of the possession, but Montenegro eked out a 2–1 victory.

=== North and Central America ===
Haiti represented North and Central America at the tournament. The nation's Football Association was only informed of its inclusion in the global competition in June following the withdrawal of Cuba. As a result, Haiti's preparations were likely less complete than some of their fellow participants.

=== South America ===
Bolivia represented South America at the tournament. The squad Douglas Cuenca will be taking to Singapore features several members of the side that contested the 2009 South American U-15 Championships and then won bronze at the Odesur Games earlier this year. The Bolivians began their preparations for the Youth Games early in July in Argentina, earning a 2–1 win over the US and a 3–3 draw with the Argentinos Juniors U-20 side.

=== Oceania ===
Vanuatu represented Oceania at the tournament, coached Etienne Mermer, who is hoping to pass on the experience of three World Cup qualifying campaigns to his young charges. The defensive midfielder from Tafea, who recently retired from the national team, has looked after the young Vanuatu team since last year. The vast majority of the squad hail from the Teouma Academy, with the team's most recent match an outing against the senior Academy side, which finished in a 2–2 draw. Perhaps the most notable squad member is towering 193 cm goalkeeper Seiloni Iaruel, with the youngster having already featured in the senior squad.

== Preliminary round ==
=== Group C ===
Team	Pld	W	D	L	GF	GA	GD	Pts
Bolivia	2	2	0	0	11	0	+11	6
Haiti	2	1	0	1	2	10	−8	3
Vanuatu	2	0	0	2	1	4	−3	0

13 August 2010
18:00

Vanuatu	0 – 2	Bolivia
	Report	Añez 19' (pen.); Banegas 42'

Jalan Besar Stadium, Singapore
Attendance: 2,479
Referee: István Vad (Hungary)

16 August 2010
18:00

Bolivia	9 – 0	Haiti
Arano 23'; Mejido 37', 43', 68', 81'; Vaca 42'; Guthrie 42'; Manzur 49'; Alpire 70'	Report

Jalan Besar Stadium, Singapore
Attendance: 1,215
Referee: Norbert Hauata (Tahiti)

19 August 2010
18:00

Haiti	2 – 1	Vanuatu
Gedeon 67'; Bonhomme 70'	Report	Ham 48'

Jalan Besar Stadium, Singapore
Attendance: 1,800
Referee: Rainhold Shikongo (Namibia)

=== Group D ===
Team	Pld	W	D	L	GF	GA	GD	Pts
Singapore	2	2	0	0	6	3	+3	6
Montenegro	2	1	0	1	4	4	0	3
Zimbabwe	2	0	0	2	2	5	−3	0

13 August 2010
20:45

Singapore	3 – 1	Zimbabwe
Amirul 1'; Muhaimin 11', 30'	Report	Kusemwa 64' (pen.)

Jalan Besar Stadium, Singapore
Attendance: 4,800
Referee: Walter López (Guatemala)

16 August 2010
20:45

Zimbabwe	1 – 2	Montenegro
Chavanigra 81'	Report	Grbović 28'; Boljević 44'

Jalan Besar Stadium, Singapore
Attendance: 1,215
Referee: Banjar Al-Dosari (Qatar)

19 August 2010
20:45

Montenegro	2 – 3	Singapore
Kosović 9', 23' (pen.)	Report	Muhaimin 3'; Lightfoot 35'; Brandon 75'

Jalan Besar Stadium, Singapore
Attendance: 5,850
Referee: Wilmar Roldan (Colombia)

=== Semi-finals ===
22 August 2010
18:00

Bolivia	3 – 1	Montenegro
Sabía 5'; Mejido 56'; Banegas 60'	Report	Boljević 26'

Jalan Besar Stadium, Singapore
Attendance: 3,500
Referee: Banjar Al-Dosari (Qatar)

22 August 2010
20:45

Singapore	0 – 2	Haiti
	Report	Bonhomme 38'; Gedeon 80' (pen.)

Jalan Besar Stadium, Singapore
Attendance: 6,000
Referee: István Vad (Hungary)

=== 5th-place match ===
23 August 2010
20:45

Vanuatu	2 – 0	Zimbabwe
Kalselik 20', 60'	Report

Jalan Besar Stadium, Singapore
Attendance: 1,615
Referee: Walter López (Guatemala)

=== Bronze-medal match ===
25 August 2010
18:00

Montenegro	1 – 4	Singapore
Baošić 14'	Report	Hanafi 6', 45'; Amirul 57' (pen.), 65'

Jalan Besar Stadium, Singapore
Attendance: 4,380
Referee: Norbert Hauata (Tahiti)

=== Final ===
25 August 2010
20:45

Bolivia	5 – 0	Haiti
Mejido 5'; Alpire 31'; Arano 53'; Banegas 60', 72'	Report

Jalan Besar Stadium, Singapore
Attendance: 5,230
Referee: István Vad (Hungary)

== Final ranking ==
Rank	Team
1st place, gold medalist(s)	Bolivia
2nd place, silver medalist(s)	Haiti
3rd place, bronze medalist(s)	Singapore
4	Montenegro
5	Vanuatu
6	Zimbabwe

== Goalscorers ==
6 goals

- (Bolivia) Rodrigo Mejido

4 goals

- (Bolivia) Luís Banegas

3 goals

- (Singapore) Ammirul Emmran
- (Singapore) Muhaimin Suhaimi

2 goals

- (Bolivia) Jorge Alpire
- (Bolivia) Paul Arano

2 goals

- (Haiti) Jean Bonhomme
- (Haiti) Daniel Gedeon
- (Montenegro) Aleksandar Boljević
- (Montenegro) Nebojša Kosović
- (Singapore) Hanafi Akbar
- (Vanuatu) Andre Kalselik

1 goal

- (Bolivia) Carlos Añez
- (Bolivia) José Guthrie

1 goal

- (Bolivia) Yasser Manzur
- (Bolivia) Jorge Sabía
- (Bolivia) Romero Vaca
- (Montenegro) Jovan Baošić
- (Montenegro) Žarko Grbović
- (Singapore) Brandon Koh
- (Singapore) Jeffrey Lightfoot
- (Vanuatu) Petch Ham
- (Zimbabwe) Stanford Chavanigra
- (Zimbabwe) Albert Kusemwa
