= Vanuatu national under-15 football team =

National association football team

Vanuatu U15
- Association: Vanuatu Football Federation
- Confederation: OFC (Oceania)
- Head coach: (Vanuatu) Moise Poida
- Captain: Ronaldo Wilkins
- Top scorer: Andre Kalselik (2)
- FIFA code: VAN
First colours	Second colours

First international
- Vanuatu 0 - 2 Bolivia (Singapore, Singapore; August 13, 2010)

Biggest win
- Vanuatu 2 - 0 Zimbabwe (Singapore, Singapore; August 23, 2010)

Biggest defeat
- Vanuatu 0 - 2 Bolivia (Singapore, Singapore; August 13, 2010)

World Cup
- Appearances: 2
- Best result: Group Stage

OFC U15 Championship
- Appearances: 0

The Vanuatu national under-15 football team is the national U-15 team of Vanuatu and is controlled by the Vanuatu Football Federation.

== Squad for Football at the 2014 Summer Youth Olympics – Boys' tournament ==
No.	Pos.	Player	Date of birth (age)	Caps	Goals	Club
1	GK	Jelson Toara	23 September 1999 (aged 14)	3	0	(Vanuatu Football Federation) Redal
16	GK	Rufare Kalsal	24 December 1999 (aged 14)	0	0	(Vanuatu Football Federation) Teouma Academy
2	DF	Benson Rarua	24 May 1999 (aged 15)	2	0	(Vanuatu Football Federation) Teouma Academy
3	DF	William Kai	22 December 1999 (aged 14)	2	0	(Vanuatu Football Federation) Teouma Academy
4	DF	Brian Taut	7 October 1999 (aged 14)	3	0	(Vanuatu Football Federation) Teouma Academy
5	DF	Zolostino Tanghwa	9 January 1999 (aged 15)	2	0	(Vanuatu Football Federation) Teouma Academy
13	DF	Dick Seth	6 June 1999 (aged 15)	1	0	(Vanuatu Football Federation) Teouma Academy
14	DF	Johnny Iwai	24 March 1999 (aged 15)	0	0	(Vanuatu Football Federation) Teouma Academy
6	MF	Micah Tommy	21 January 1999 (aged 15)	2	0	(Vanuatu Football Federation) Tafea
8	MF	Waiwo Kalmet	26 April 1999 (aged 15)	3	0	(Vanuatu Football Federation) Tafea
10	MF	Ronaldo Wilkins	30 December 1999 (aged 14)	3	0	(New Zealand Football) Wellington Phoenix
12	MF	Rene Kuse	24 March 1999 (aged 15)	3	0	(Vanuatu Football Federation) Teouma Academy
15	MF	Jules Bororoa	20 March 1999 (aged 15)	3	1	(Vanuatu Football Federation) Teouma Academy
17	MF	Lauren Saurei	6 July 1999 (aged 15)	2	0	(Vanuatu Football Federation) Teouma Academy
18	MF	Vira Womal	2 February 1999 (aged 15)	3	0	(Vanuatu Football Federation) Teouma Academy
7	FW	Samuel Namatak	30 May 1999 (aged 15)	3	0	(Vanuatu Football Federation) Teouma Academy
9	FW	Terrence Roberts	2 March 1999 (aged 15)	3	0	(Vanuatu Football Federation) Teouma Academy
11	FW	Leo Rau	14 October 1999 (aged 14)	3	0	(Vanuatu Football Federation) Teouma Academy

== Squad for Football at the 2010 Summer Youth Olympics – Boys' tournament ==
Caps and goals as of 30 August 2010.

No.	Pos.	Player	Date of birth (age)	Caps	Goals	Club
1	GK	Seiloni Iaruel	17 April 1995 (aged 15)	3	0	(Vanuatu Football Federation) Tafea
17	GK	Jordy Meltecoin	28 December 1995 (aged 14)	2	0	Unattached
2	DF	Chanel Obed(c)	30 September 1995 (aged 14)	3	0	(Vanuatu Football Federation) Amicale
3	DF	Raoul Coulon	3 December 1995 (aged 14)	3	0	(Vanuatu Football Federation) Tupuji Imere
4	DF	Yoan Ben	10 December 1995 (aged 14)	3	0	Unattached
5	DF	Jelene Waiwai	20 May 1995 (aged 15)	3	0	(Vanuatu Football Federation) Spirit 08
14	DF	Michel Coulon	3 December 1995 (aged 14)	3	0	(Vanuatu Football Federation) Tupuji Imere
18	DF	Mois Bong	20 May 1995 (aged 15)	1	0	Unattached
6	MF	Andre Kalselik	17 October 1995 (aged 14)	3	2	Unattached
7	MF	Donald Avock	11 July 1995 (aged 15)	3	0	Unattached
8	MF	Barry Mansale	1 November 1995 (aged 14)	3	0	(Vanuatu Football Federation) Tupuji Imere
10	MF	Steve Bebe	23 September 1995 (aged 14)	3	0	Unattached
11	MF	Franco Tawal	15 July 1995 (aged 15)	1	0	Unattached
13	MF	George Mahit	13 August 1995 (aged 15)	1	0	Unattached
15	MF	Petch Ham	7 November 1995 (aged 14)	3	1	Unattached
9	FW	Santino Mermer	28 May 1995 (aged 15)	3	0	(Vanuatu Football Federation) Shepherds United
12	FW	Sylver Tenene	5 May 1995 (aged 15)	0	0	Unattached
16	FW	Edwin Bai	21 December 1995 (aged 14)	0	0	(Vanuatu Football Federation) Malampa Revivors
