= Tavita To'o =

Samoan footballer (born 2002)

Personal information
- Date of birth: July 19, 2002 (age 24)
- Place of birth: Apia

Team information
- Current team: Vailima Kiwi FC

Senior career*
Years	Team	Apps	(Gls)
2018-	Vailima Kiwi FC		

International career
2018	Samoa U17		
2022–	Samoa Futsal	2	(1)
- * Club domestic league appearances and goals

Tavita Mose To'o (born 19 July 2002) is a Samoan footballer who plays for Vailima Kiwi FC and has represented Samoa as part of the Samoa national under-17 football team and Samoa national futsal team.

== Career ==
To'o was born in Sinamoga in Apia. He started playing soccer when he was eight years old. He first played for Tama o le Mau FC, before moving to Vailima Kiwi FC in 2018.

In July 2018 he was selected for the Samoa national under-17 football team for the 2018 OFC U-16 Championship. In 2019 he was part of the Vailima Kiwi team which contested the 2019 OFC Champions League. In 2022 he was selected for the Samoa national futsal team to contest the 2022 OFC Futsal Cup. In the following year, he was selected for the 2023 OFC Futsal Nations Cup.
