= Papua New Guinea national futsal team =

Papua New Guinea
- Nickname(s): Kapuls (Cuscus)
- Association: Papua New Guinea; Football Association
- Confederation: Oceania Football Confederation (Oceania)
- FIFA code: PNG
- FIFA ranking: NR (4 April 2025)
Home colours	Away colours

First international
- Vanuatu 2–2 Papua New Guinea (Port Vila, Vanuatu, 21 August 1999)

Biggest win
- Papua New Guinea 8–1 New Zealand (Port Vila, Vanuatu, 27 August 1999)

Biggest defeat
- Australia 7–1 Papua New Guinea (Port Vila, Vanuatu, 25 August 1999)

FIFA World Cup
- Appearances: 0

Oceanian Futsal Championship
- Appearances: 1 (First in 1999)
- Best result: 4th place, 1999

The Papua New Guinea national futsal team is controlled by the Papua New Guinea Football Association, the governing body for futsal in Papua New Guinea and represents the country in international futsal competitions, such as the World Cup and the Oceanian Futsal Championship.

== Tournament records ==
=== FIFA Futsal World Cup ===
FIFA World Cup Record
Year	Round	Pld	W	D	L	GS	GA
Guatemala 2000	Did not qualify	-	-	-	-	-	-
Taiwan 2004	Did not enter	-	-	-	-	-	-
Brazil 2008	Did not enter	-	-	-	-	-	-
Thailand 2012	Did not enter	-	-	-	-	-	-
Colombia 2016	Did not enter	-	-	-	-	-	-
Lithuania 2021	To be determined	-	-	-	-	-	-
Uzbekistan 2024	To be determined						
Total	0/7	-	-	-	-	-	-

=== Oceanian Futsal Championship record ===
Oceanian Futsal Championship Record
Year	Round	Pld	W	D	L	GS	GA
Vanuatu 1999	4th place	6	3	1	2	23	16
Australia 2004	Did not enter	-	-	-	-	-	-
Fiji 2008	Did not enter	-	-	-	-	-	-
Fiji 2009	Did not enter	-	-	-	-	-	-
Fiji 2010	Did not enter	-	-	-	-	-	-
Fiji 2011	Did not enter	-	-	-	-	-	-
New Zealand 2013	Did not enter	-	-	-	-	-	-
New Caledonia 2014	Did not enter	-	-	-	-	-	-
Fiji 2016	Did not enter	-	-	-	-	-	-
New Caledonia 2019	Did not enter	-	-	-	-	-	-
Total	1/9	6	3	1	2	23	16
