= Four Nation's Friendship Cup =

2015 Four Nations Friendship Cup

Tournament details
- Host country: Vanuatu
- City: Port Vila
- Dates: 13–17 June 2015
- Teams: 4 (from 1 confederation)
- Venue(s): 1 (in 1 host city)

Final positions
- Champions: Vanuatu (1st title)
- Runners-up: New Caledonia
- Third place: Fiji
- Fourth place: Solomon Islands

Tournament statistics
- Matches played: 8
- Goals scored: 9 (1.13 per match)
- Top scorer(s): (Fiji) Christopher Wasasala (2)
- Best player(s): (Solomon Islands) Tutizama Tanito

The Four Nations Friendship Cup was a tournament played in June 2015. The tournament was used to help teams to prepare for the 2015 Pacific Games.

== Participating teams ==
- Fiji
- New Caledonia
- Solomon Islands
- Vanuatu

== Group stage ==
Pos	Team	Pld	W	D	L	GF	GA	GD	Pts
1	Vanuatu (C, H)	3	2	1	0	2	0	+2	7
2	New Caledonia	3	1	1	1	4	2	+2	4
3	Fiji	3	0	2	1	2	3	−1	2
4	Solomon Islands	3	0	2	1	1	4	−3	2

(C) Champions; (H) Hosts
13 June 2015
13:00 UTC+13

New Caledonia	0–1	Vanuatu
	Report	Nilua Nickson Nikau 5'

(Vanuatu) Port Vila Municipal Stadium, Port Vila
Referee: Nawen Hopkims (Vanuatu)
13 June 2015
15:00 UTC+13

Fiji	1–1	Solomon Islands
Christopher Wasasala 72'	Report	Tutizama Tanito 25'

(Vanuatu) Port Vila Municipal Stadium, Port Vila

15 June 2015
13:00 UTC+13

Vanuatu	0–0	Solomon Islands
	Report

(Vanuatu) Port Vila Municipal Stadium, Port Vila
15 June 2015
15:00 UTC+13

New Caledonia	1–1	Fiji
Jean-Brice Wadriako 87'	Report	Christopher Wasasala 20'; Christopher Wasasala (red card)

(Vanuatu) Port Vila Municipal Stadium, Port Vila

17 June 2015
12:30 UTC+13

Solomon Islands	0–3	New Caledonia
	Report	Shaffy Mandaoue 22'; Nathaniel Hmaen 56'; Leon Wahnawe 86'

(Vanuatu) Port Vila Municipal Stadium, Port Vila
17 June 2015
14:30 UTC+13

Fiji	0–1	Vanuatu
	Report	Brian Kaltack 38' (pen.)

(Vanuatu) Port Vila Municipal Stadium, Port Vila

== Awards ==
The Golden Ball Award is awarded to the most outstanding player of the tournament. The Golden Glove Award is awarded to the best goalkeeper of the tournament. The Golden Boot Award is awarded to the top scorer of the tournament. The Fair Play Award is awarded to the team with the best disciplinary record at the tournament.

Award	Recipient
Golden Ball	(Solomon Islands) Tutizama Tanito
Golden Glove	(Vanuatu) Seiloni Iaruel
Golden Boot	(Fiji) Christopher Wasasala (2 goals)
Fair Play Award	Solomon Islands

== Goal scorers ==
2 goals

- Christopher Wasasala

1 goal

- Brian Kaltack
- Jean-Brice Wadriako
- Leon Wahnawe
- Nathaniel Hmaen
- Nilua Nickson Nikau
- Shaffy Mandaoue
- Tutizama Tanito

== See also ==
- Men's Football at the 2015 Pacific Games
- Football at the 2016 Summer Olympics
