= Jovan Baošić =

Montenegrin footballer

Personal information
- Full name: Jovan Baošić
- Date of birth: 7 July 1995 (age 31)
- Place of birth: Bijelo Polje, FR Yugoslavia
- Height: 1.86 m (6 ft 1 in)
- Position: Centre-back

Team information
- Current team: FK Mornar
- Number: 15

Senior career*
Years	Team	Apps	(Gls)
2012–2015	Mogren	38	(0)
2015–2016	Jagodina	7	(0)
2016–2017	FK Jedinstvo	27	(1)
2017	Rudar Pljevlja	2	(0)
2018	FK Jedinstvo	15	(1)
2018–2020	Zeta	13	(0)
2020-2021	Újpest FC	12	(0)
2021-2022	Budućnost Podgorica	2	(0)
2022-	FK Mornar	100	(3)

International career
2011	Montenegro U17	3	(0)
2013–2014	Montenegro U19	5	(1)
- * Club domestic league appearances and goals as of 1 June 2026

Jovan Baošić (Serbian Cyrillic: Јован Баошић; born 7 July 1995) is a Montenegrin professional footballer who plays as a defender for FK Mornar in the Montenegrin First League.

== Club career ==
Born in Bijelo Polje, Baošić moved to Budva at the age of 15, and played for Mogren from 2012 to 2015. He signed for Jagodina in summer 2015.

Baošić played for Montenegro U16 at the 2010 Summer Youth Olympics held in Singapore where score against Singapore U16 in the tournament.

== Career statistics ==
As of 20 March 2016

Club performance			League		Play-off		Cup		Continental		Total	
Season	Club	League	Apps	Goals	Apps	Goals	Apps	Goals	Apps	Goals	Apps	Goals
2011–12	Mogren	First League	1	0	0	0	0	0	0	0	1	0
2012–13	Mogren	First League	12	0	0	0	0	0	0	0	12	0
2013–14	Mogren	First League	7	0	1	0	1	0	0	0	9	0
2014–15	Mogren	First League	18	0	0	0	0	0	0	0	18	0
2015–16	Jagodina	SuperLiga	7	0	1	0	0	0	0	0	8	0
Career total			45	0	2	0	1	0	0	0	48	0
