= Raoul Coulon =

Vanuatuan footballer

Personal information
- Full name: Raoul Charles Coulon
- Date of birth: 3 December 1995 (age 30)
- Place of birth: Port Vila, Vanuatu
- Positions: Defender; midfielder

Team information
- Current team: Vanuatu United
- Number: 16

Senior career*
Years	Team	Apps	(Gls)
2010–2018	Tupuji Imere		
2018–2025	Nalkutan		
2026–	Vanuatu United	2	(0)

International career^{‡}
2010	Vanuatu U15	3	(0)
2011	Vanuatu U17	5	(0)
2013	Vanuatu U20	2	(0)
2015–	Vanuatu U23	9	(0)
2016–	Vanuatu	4	(0)
Medal record
Men's football
Representing Vanuatu
OFC U-20 Championship
Third place	2013 Fiji
MSG Prime Minister's Cup
Third place	2023 New Caledonia
- * Club domestic league appearances and goals as of 23 January 2026 ‡ National team caps and goals as of 11 July 2016

Raoul Coulon (born 3 December 1995) is a Vanuatuan footballer who can play as a right back, central defender and as a defensive midfielder. He plays for Vanuatuan clubside Vanuatu United in the OFC Professional League. He made his debut for the national team on March 26, 2016, in their 2–1 win against New Caledonia.

In 2020 the Coulon twins were expected to move to Lautoka in Fiji, but the move did not eventuate.

== Personal life ==
Raoul has a twin brother, Michel, who also plays for Tupuji Imere as well as various national youth teams. They played together at the 2010 Summer Youth Olympics.

== Honours ==
Vanuatu

- MSG Prime Minister's Cup: 3rd place 2023

Vanuatu U20

- OFC U-20 Championship: 3rd place, 2013
