= Paul Arano =

Bolivian football midfielder (born 1995)

Personal information
- Full name: Cristian Paul Arano Ruiz
- Date of birth: February 23, 1995 (age 31)
- Place of birth: Santa Cruz de la Sierra, Bolivia
- Height: 1.87 m (6 ft 1 1/2 in)
- Position: Midfielder

Team information
- Current team: Guabirá
- Number: 8

Youth career
- 2008–2013: Tahuichi Academy

Senior career*
Years	Team	Apps	(Gls)
2014–2016	Blooming	30	(1)
2017	Petrolero	20	(1)
2018–2019	Blooming	85	(25)
2020–2021	Wilstermann	24	(2)
2022–2023	Blooming	15	(2)
2023–2024	The Strongest	5	(0)
2024–2025	Real Tomayapo	21	(3)
2025–	Guabirá	6	(0)

International career^{‡}
2010	Bolivia U16	4	(1)
2015	Bolivia U20	4	(0)
2018–	Bolivia	10	(0)
- * Club domestic league appearances and goals ‡ National team caps and goals as of 22 March 2021

Cristian Paul Arano Ruiz (born 23 February 1995, in Santa Cruz de la Sierra) is a Bolivian professional footballer midfielder currently playing for Guabirá in the Bolivian Primera División and the Bolivia national team.

== Club career ==
Arano made his first division debut in a 3–0 home victory over Nacional Potosí on 13 March 2014. He scored his first goal with Blooming on 9 August 2015, in a 1–1 draw against The Strongest at Estadio Hernando Siles.

== International career ==
=== Youth ===
In 2010, Arano was selected by Bolivia U16 squad to play in the 2010 Summer Youth Olympics held in Singapore. He scored a goal on 16 August 2010 in a 9–0 thrashing win against Haiti U16.

Arano was summoned to the Bolivian U20 team to play in the 2015 South American Youth Football Championship.

=== Senior ===
Arano was named in Bolivia's senior squad for a 2018 FIFA World Cup qualifier against Venezuela in November 2015 but he didn't make an appearance.

He make his debut for Bolivia on 13 October 2018 during a friendly match against Myanmar in a 3–0 win in Yangon.

Arano was selected by head coach Eduardo Villegas to be part of Bolivia 2019 Copa América squad. He make his only appearance playing the full match against Venezuela in a 1–3 lost on 22 June 2019.

On 16 October 2019, Arano recorded his first assist where he set up Erwin Saavedra for his second goal of the game as Bolivia went on to win Haiti 3–1 in a friendly match.

== Club career ==
Club performance			League		Cup		League Cup		Total	
Season	Club	League	Apps	Goals	Apps	Goals	Apps	Goals	Apps	Goals
League		Apertura and Clausura			Copa Cine Center		Total			
2013/14	Blooming	Liga de Fútbol Profesional Boliviano	2	0	-	-	-	-	2	0
2014/15	Blooming	Liga de Fútbol Profesional Boliviano	9	0	-	-	-	-	9	0
2015/16	Blooming	Liga de Fútbol Profesional Boliviano	2	1	5	0	-	-	7	1
Total			13	1	5	0	-	-	18	1
