= Samoa national futsal team =

Samoa
- Association: Football Federation Samoa
- Confederation: Oceania Football Confederation (Oceania)
- FIFA code: SAM
- FIFA ranking: 130 ▲2 (12 December 2025)
Home colours	Away colours

First international
- Vanuatu 10–2 Western Samoa (Port Vila, Vanuatu, 3 August 1996)

Biggest win
- Cook Islands 3–5 Samoa (Port Vila, Vanuatu, 26 August 1999)

Biggest defeat
- Western Samoa 1–23 Australia (Port Vila, Vanuatu, 4 August 1996)

FIFA World Cup
- Appearances: 0

Oceanian Futsal Championship
- Appearances: 3 (First in 1996)
- Best result: 4th, (1996)

The Samoa national futsal team is controlled by Football Federation Samoa, the governing body for futsal in Samoa and represents the country in international futsal competitions, such as the World Cup and the Oceanian Futsal Championship.

== Tournament records ==
=== FIFA Futsal World Cup ===
FIFA World Cup Record
Year	Round	Pld	W	D	L	GS	GA
Spain 1996	Did not qualify	-	-	-	-	-	-
Guatemala 2000	Did not qualify	-	-	-	-	-	-
Taiwan 2004	Did not qualify	-	-	-	-	-	-
Brazil 2008	Did not enter	-	-	-	-	-	-
Thailand 2012	Did not enter	-	-	-	-	-	-
Colombia 2016	Did not enter	-	-	-	-	-	-
Lithuania 2020	Did not enter	-	-	-	-	-	-
Uzbekistan 2024	To be determined						
Total	0/8	-	-	-	-	-	-

=== Oceanian Futsal Championship ===
Oceanian Futsal Championship Record
Year	Round	Pld	W	D	L	GS	GA
Vanuatu 1996	4th place	6	0	0	6	17	78
Vanuatu 1999	6th place	6	1	0	5	19	40
Australia 2004	6th place	5	0	0	5	9	28
Fiji 2008	Did not enter	-	-	-	-	-	-
Fiji 2009	Did not enter	-	-	-	-	-	-
Fiji 2010	Did not enter	-	-	-	-	-	-
Fiji 2011	Did not enter	-	-	-	-	-	-
New Zealand 2013	Did not enter	-	-	-	-	-	-
New Caledonia 2014	Did not enter	-	-	-	-	-	-
Fiji 2016	Did not enter	-	-	-	-	-	-
Total	3/11	17	1	0	16	45	146
