= Seiloni Iaruel =

Vanuatuan footballer (born 1995)

Personal information
- Full name: Fakipole Seiloni Iaruel
- Date of birth: 17 April 1995 (age 31)
- Place of birth: Vanuatu
- Height: 1.95 m (6 ft 5 in)
- Position: Goalkeeper

Team information
- Current team: Amicale
- Number: 1

Senior career*
Years	Team	Apps	(Gls)
2011–2016	Tafea		
2016–	Amicale		

International career
2010	Vanuatu U15		
2011	Vanuatu U17		
2011–2013	Vanuatu U20		
2012–2015	Vanuatu U23	13	(0)
2012–	Vanuatu	6	(0)
Medal record
Men's football
Representing Vanuatu
OFC U-20 Championship
Third place	2011 New Zealand
Third place	2013 Fiji
MSG Prime Minister's Cup
Winner	2025 Papua New Guinea
- * Club domestic league appearances and goals

Fakipole Seiloni Iaruel (born 17 April 1995) is a Vanuatuan footballer who plays as a goalkeeper for Amicale in the Port Vila Football League and the Vanuatu national football team. He made his debut for the national team on 3 June 2012 in their 5–0 victory against Samoa.

== Club career ==
In 2011, Iaruel joined Port Vila Football League club Tafea. After having been scouted by Stoke City, he was invited to their academy for a month long trial in August 2012. In 2016, he decided to join Amicale for the 2016 OFC Champions League.

== International career ==
Iaruel played for Vanuatu U15, Vanuatu U17, Vanuatu U20, Vanuatu U23 and since June 2012 he plays for Vanuatu.

== Honours ==
=== Player ===
Vanuatu

- MSG Prime Minister's Cup: 2025

Vanuatu U23

- Four Nation’s Friendship Cup: First place

Vanuatu U20

- OFC U-20 Championship: 3rd place, 2011, 2013

=== Individual ===
- Four Nation’s Friendship Cup Golden Glove
