= Atta Elayyan =

New Zealand futsal player of Palestinian origin and CEO (1985–2019)

- عطا عليان
- Elayyan in an undated photo
- Born: Atta Mohammed Elayyan; 21 June 1985; Kuwait
- Died: 15 March 2019 (aged 33); Al Noor Mosque, Christchurch, New Zealand
- Cause of death: Gunshot wounds
- Education: University of Canterbury
- Occupations: Futsal player, developer, businessman, coach
- Spouse: Farah Talal
- Children: 1
Futsal career
- Position: Goalkeeper
Senior career*
Years	Team	Apps	(Gls)
- Canterbury United Dragons
International career
	New Zealand Futsal	19	
- * Club domestic league appearances and goals

Atta Mohammed Elayyan (Arabic: عطا عليان; 21 June 1985 – 15 March 2019) was a Jordanian-New Zealand futsal player, coach, businessman, and developer. As a futsal player, Elayyan played on the New Zealand national futsal team and coached for the Christchurch Boys' High School. As a businessman and developer, he founded several businesses including Lazyworm Applications and LWA Solutions. He was murdered in the Christchurch mosque shootings.

== Early life ==
Atta Mohammed Elayyan was born in Kuwait, to parents Maysoon Salama and Mohammed Elayyan. However, he grew up in Jordan. He was of Palestinian ancestry, and his father was from the Abu Dis area of East Jerusalem.

Beginning in the early 1990s, Elayyan lived in Corvallis, Oregon, where his father established a mosque and school. There he attended Wilson Elementary School. He later moved to Christchurch, as a preteen, and attended Christchurch Boys' High School and the University of Canterbury's computer science programme. His father, Mohammed Elayyan, co-founded one of the Christchurch mosques in 1993, a year after arriving in New Zealand.

From 2002 until 2008, Elayyan was a member of the New Zealand–based Counter-Strike team called NewType. He played Counter-Strike: Source professionally in this time, and won several competitions. While a member of the Counter-Strike community, Elayyan participated in tournaments and posted on forums under the nicknames crazyarab and Cr@zyArab.

== Futsal career ==
Elayyan was the goalkeeper for the Canterbury United Futsal Dragons and had made 19 appearances for the New Zealand national futsal team. He won two national titles with the Canterbury team and was the recipient of New Zealand Football's futsal player of the year award in 2014.

Elayyan had been coaching the Christchurch Boys' High School futsal team that had entered the secondary schools' national competition. This tournament was set to start on 25 March 2019.

== Business career ==
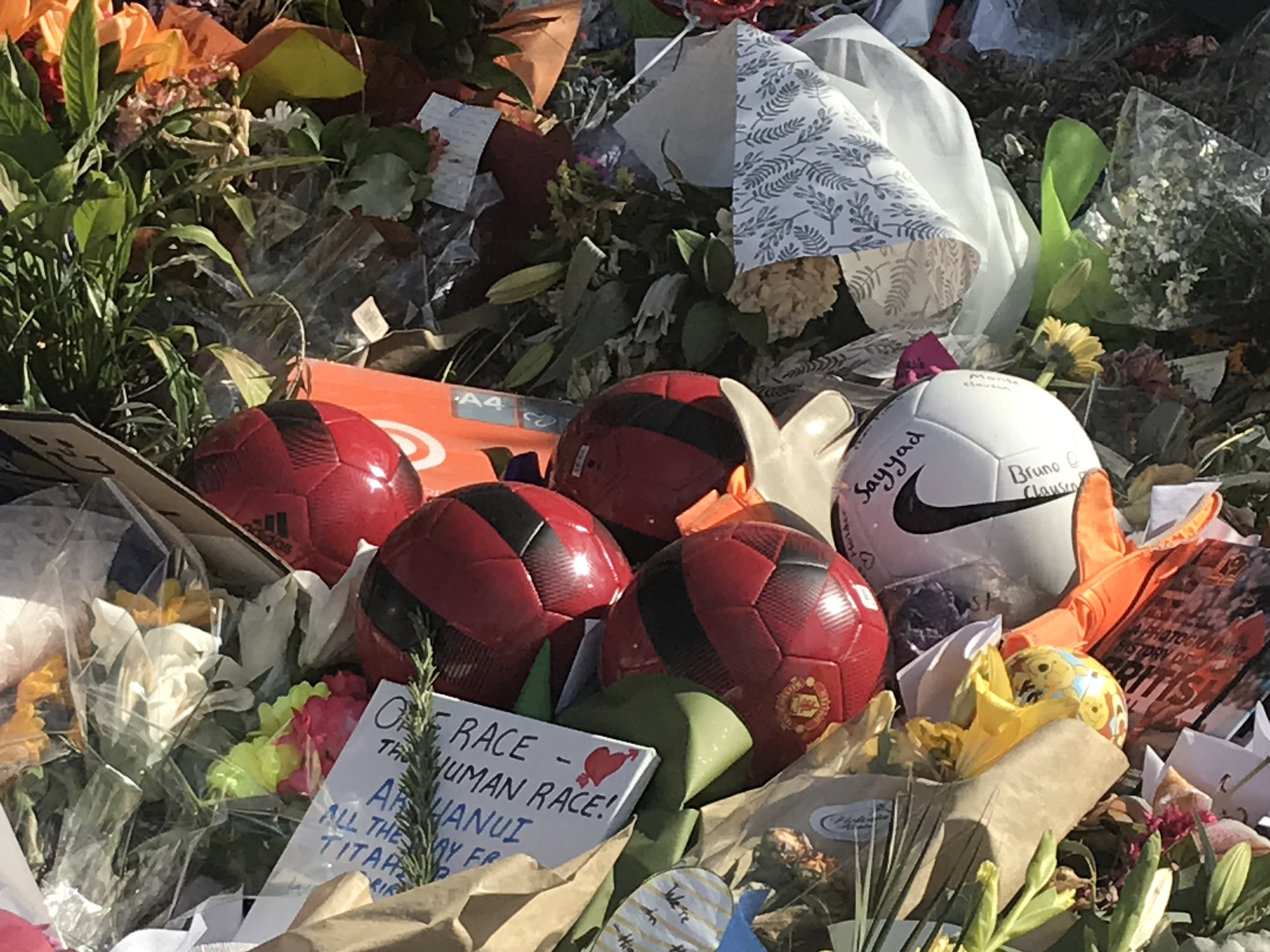
Memorial to Elayyan amongst the floral tributes on Rolleston Avenue, Christchurch

In 2010 he co-founded Lazyworm Applications, a business specializing in the delivery of applications on Microsoft platforms. Lazyworm Applications were responsible for building a top-selling YouTube app on the Microsoft platform, called MetroTube, and a Twitter app also on the Microsoft platform, called Tweetro. He founded its services arm, LWA Solutions, in 2012, and remained its CEO until his death. He was also awarded the prestigious Microsoft MVP award during this period. During his time as CEO, LWA Solutions undertook major ventures with many of New Zealand's largest companies and corporations, including major virtual reality technology for Ports of Auckland which has been described as a world first. LWA Solutions was a finalist in the 2015 Microsoft Partner Awards.

== Death ==
On 15 March 2019, Elayyan was fatally shot during the Christchurch mosque shootings.

After his death, several donation initiatives were started by close friends to assist Elayyan's family, including a GoFundMe campaign that raised more than £25,000 and a Give A Little campaign that raised about $196,000. Mohammed Elayyan was also shot and wounded in the attacks but survived.

Elayyan was married and is survived by his wife and daughter, who was 2 years old at the time of his death. The couple married in 2015, and his wife is from Jordan.
