= Michel Coulon (footballer) =

Ni-Vanuatu footballer (born 1995)

Personal information
- Full name: Kalmalap Michel Coulon
- Date of birth: 3 December 1995 (age 30)
- Place of birth: Port Vila, Vanuatu
- Position: Midfielder

Team information
- Current team: Vanuatu United FC
- Number: 14

Senior career*
Years	Team	Apps	(Gls)
2017–2025	Tupuji Imere F.C.		
2026–	Vanuatu United FC	4	(0)

International career^{‡}
- Vanuatu U15
	Vanuatu U17	5	(1)
	Vanuatu U20	3	(0)
	Vanuatu U23	2	(0)
2018–	Vanuatu	9	(1)
- Vanuatu Futsal
Medal record
Men's football
Representing Vanuatu
OFC Nations Cup
Runner-up	2024 Fiji/Vanuatu
OFC U-20 Championship
Third place	2013 Fiji
MSG Prime Minister's Cup
Winner	2025 Papua New Guinea
- * Club domestic league appearances and goals ‡ National team caps and goals as of 18 July 2019

Kalmalap Michel Coulon (born 3 December 1995) is a Ni-Vanuatu footballer who plays as a midfielder for Vanuatu United FC and the Vanuatu national team.

Michel is the current captain of the Vanuatu National Futsal Gideons team and has been capped 4 times in the recent OFC Futsal Men's Cup 2025, held in Suva, Fiji.

== International career ==
=== International goals ===
Scores and results list Vanuatu's goal tally first.

No.	Date	Venue	Opponent	Score	Result	Competition
1.	15 July 2019	National Soccer Stadium, Apia, Samoa	Tonga	6–0	14–0	2019 Pacific Games

== Personal life ==
Michel has a twin brother, Raoul, who also plays alongside him in Icount Yatel F.C as well as the Vanuatu National Team. They had played together at the 2010 Summer Youth Olympics.

== Honours ==
=== Player ===
Vanuatu

- OFC Nations Cup: Runner-up, 2024
- MSG Prime Minister's Cup: 2025

Vanuatu U20

- OFC U-20 Championship: 3rd place, 2013
