= Païta =

Commune of New Caledonia

- Commune
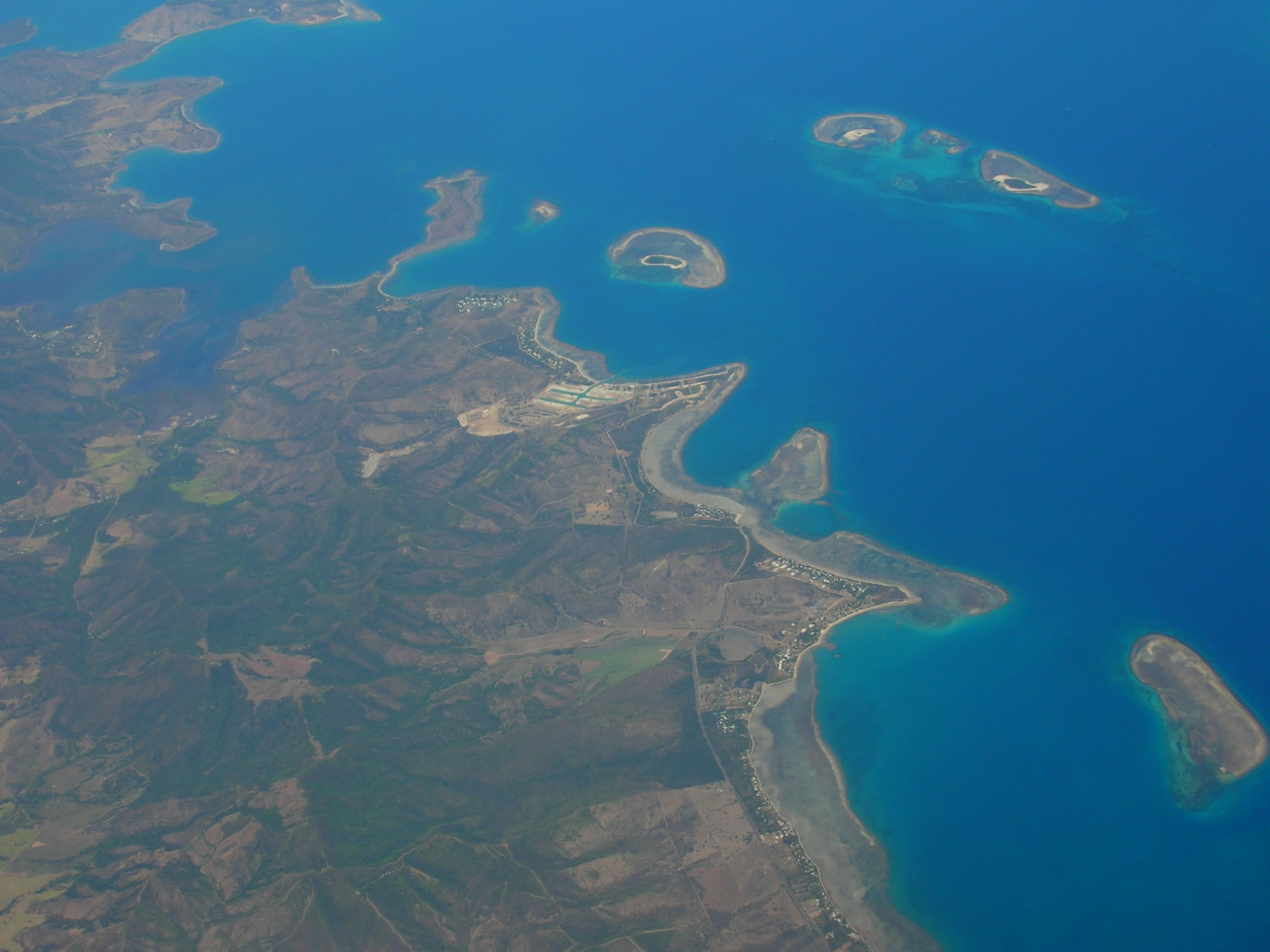
- An aerial view of Païta

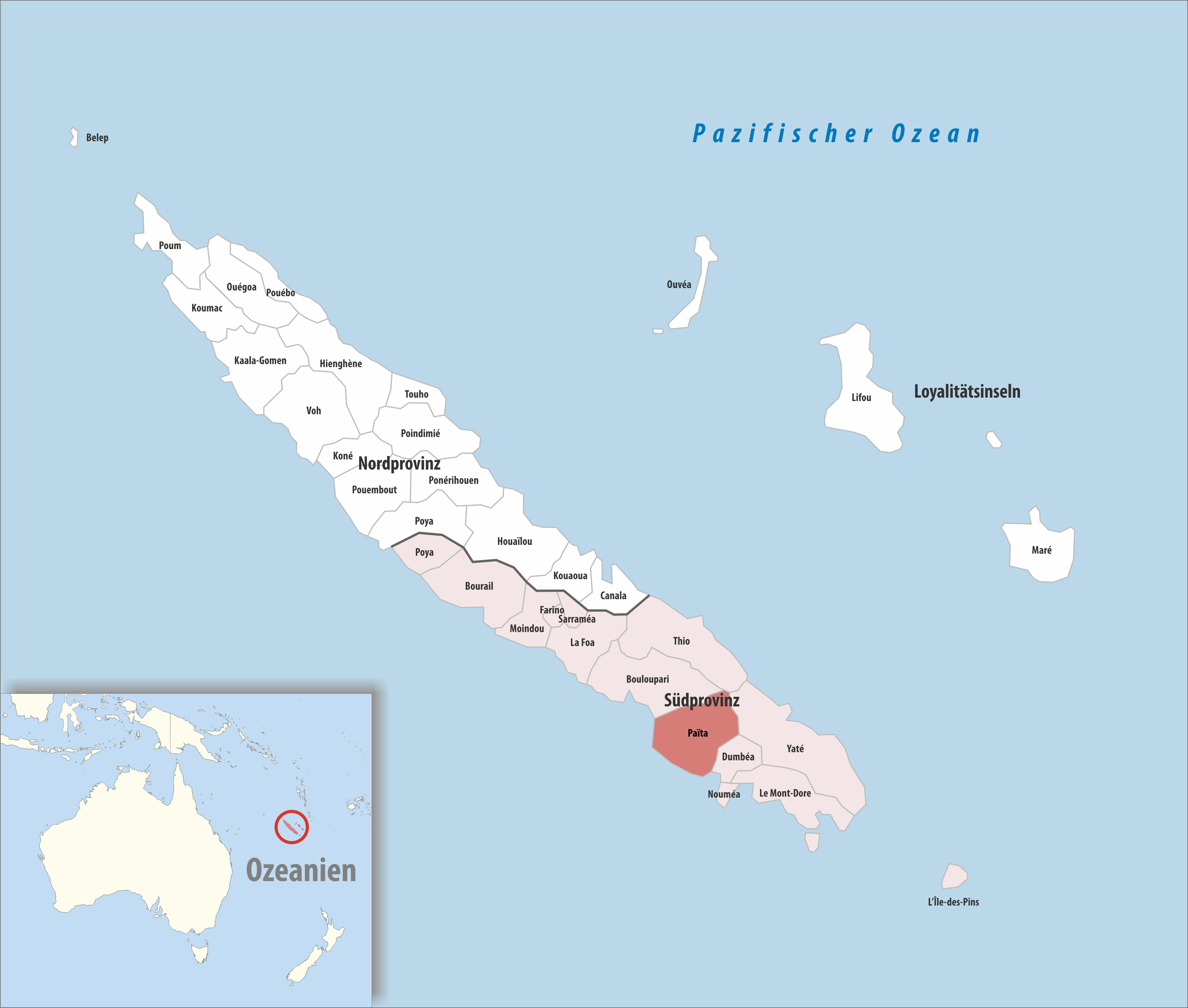
- Location of the commune (in red) within New Caledonia
- Location of Païta
- Coordinates: 22°08′01″S 166°21′02″E
- Country: France
- Sui generis collectivity: New Caledonia
- Province: South Province

Government
  - Mayor (2024–2026): Marilyne Courtot
- Area^{1}: 699.7 km^{2} (270.2 sq mi)
- Elevation: 30 m (98 ft)
- Highest elevation: 1,618 m (5,308 ft)
- Lowest elevation: 0 m (0 ft)
- Population (2019): 24,563
  - Density: 35.11/km^{2} (90.92/sq mi)

Ethnic distribution
  - 2019 census: Kanaks 22.31% Wallisians and Futunans 19.83% Europeans 19.74% Mixed 15.72% Other 22.4%
- Time zone: UTC+11:00
- INSEE/Postal code: 98821 /98890
- ^{1} New Caledonia Land Register (DITTT) data, which exclude lakes and ponds larger than 1 km² (0.386 sq mi or 247 acres) as well as the estuaries of rivers.

Païta (French: [pajta], Dumbea: Pweyta) is a commune in the suburbs of Nouméa in the South Province of New Caledonia, an overseas territory of France in the Pacific Ocean. New Caledonia's international airport, La Tontouta International Airport, is located there.

== Geography ==
=== Climate ===
Païta features a tropical savanna climate (Köppen: Aw). The average annual temperature in Païta is 23.3 °C (73.9 °F). The average annual rainfall is 851.9 mm (33.54 in) with March as the wettest month. The temperatures are highest on average in February, at around 26.9 °C (80.4 °F), and lowest in July, at around 19.5 °C (67.1 °F). The highest temperature ever recorded in Païta was 38.1 °C (100.6 °F) on 4 March 1997; the coldest temperature ever recorded was 6.3 °C (43.3 °F) on 8 August 1957.

Climate data for Païta (La Tontouta, 1991−2020 normals, extremes 1951−present)
Month	Jan	Feb	Mar	Apr	May	Jun	Jul	Aug	Sep	Oct	Nov	Dec	Year
Record high °C (°F)	37.5 (99.5)	37.9 (100.2)	38.1 (100.6)	35.7 (96.3)	33.2 (91.8)	33.2 (91.8)	32.6 (90.7)	31.1 (88.0)	34.8 (94.6)	35.1 (95.2)	36.8 (98.2)	37.5 (99.5)	38.1 (100.6)
Mean daily maximum °C (°F)	31.7 (89.1)	31.7 (89.1)	30.6 (87.1)	29.0 (84.2)	27.0 (80.6)	25.4 (77.7)	24.5 (76.1)	24.8 (76.6)	26.7 (80.1)	28.6 (83.5)	30.2 (86.4)	31.5 (88.7)	28.5 (83.3)
Daily mean °C (°F)	26.6 (79.9)	26.9 (80.4)	26.1 (79.0)	24.4 (75.9)	22.3 (72.1)	20.7 (69.3)	19.5 (67.1)	19.6 (67.3)	20.8 (69.4)	22.7 (72.9)	24.3 (75.7)	25.9 (78.6)	23.3 (73.9)
Mean daily minimum °C (°F)	21.5 (70.7)	22.1 (71.8)	21.6 (70.9)	19.7 (67.5)	17.5 (63.5)	16.0 (60.8)	14.6 (58.3)	14.3 (57.7)	15.0 (59.0)	16.8 (62.2)	18.4 (65.1)	20.3 (68.5)	18.1 (64.6)
Record low °C (°F)	14.7 (58.5)	15.6 (60.1)	12.2 (54.0)	12.0 (53.6)	9.0 (48.2)	6.8 (44.2)	6.4 (43.5)	6.3 (43.3)	7.8 (46.0)	8.9 (48.0)	10.7 (51.3)	13.4 (56.1)	6.3 (43.3)
Average precipitation mm (inches)	94.9 (3.74)	122.0 (4.80)	133.9 (5.27)	73.0 (2.87)	64.2 (2.53)	64.1 (2.52)	57.9 (2.28)	65.9 (2.59)	28.3 (1.11)	23.9 (0.94)	40.4 (1.59)	83.4 (3.28)	851.9 (33.54)
Average precipitation days (≥ 1.0 mm)	8.4	9.6	10.1	6.4	7.0	6.8	6.9	6.6	3.8	3.2	4.1	6.3	79.2
Mean monthly sunshine hours	219.6	182.7	182.9	174.3	163.0	146.1	166.2	191.7	221.3	249.3	239.1	239.8	2,376
Source 1: Météo-France
Source 2: Service de la météorologie de la Nouvelle-Calédonie

== Population ==
Historical population
Year	Pop.	±% p.a.
1956	1,397	—
1963	1,903	+4.51%
1969	2,522	+4.81%
1976	3,407	+4.39%
1983	4,834	+5.12%
1989	6,049	+3.81%
1996	7,862	+3.82%
2004	12,062	+5.50%
2009	16,358	+6.28%
2014	20,616	+4.74%
2019	24,563	+3.57%
Source: ISEE

== Sights ==
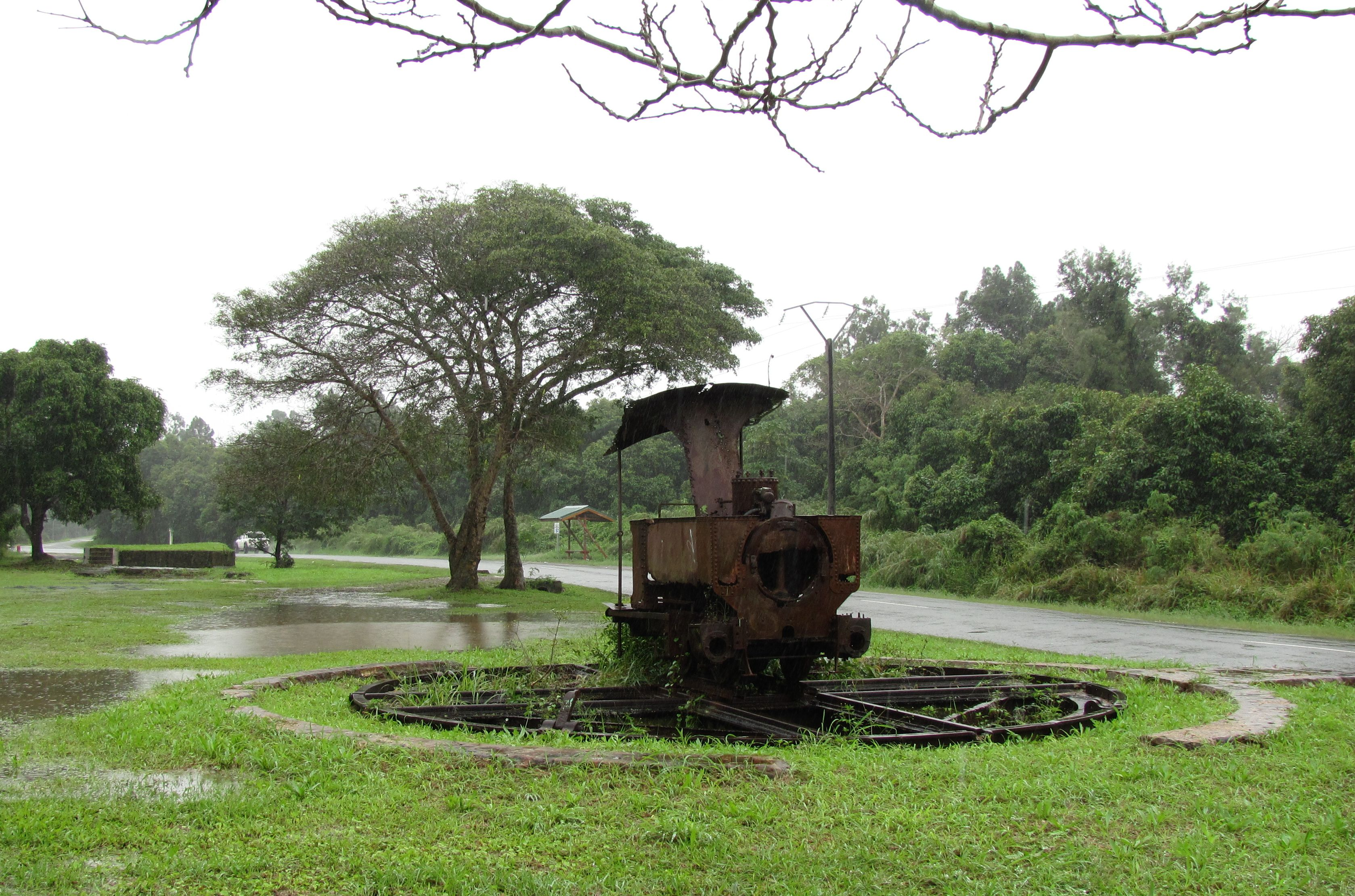
Locomotive

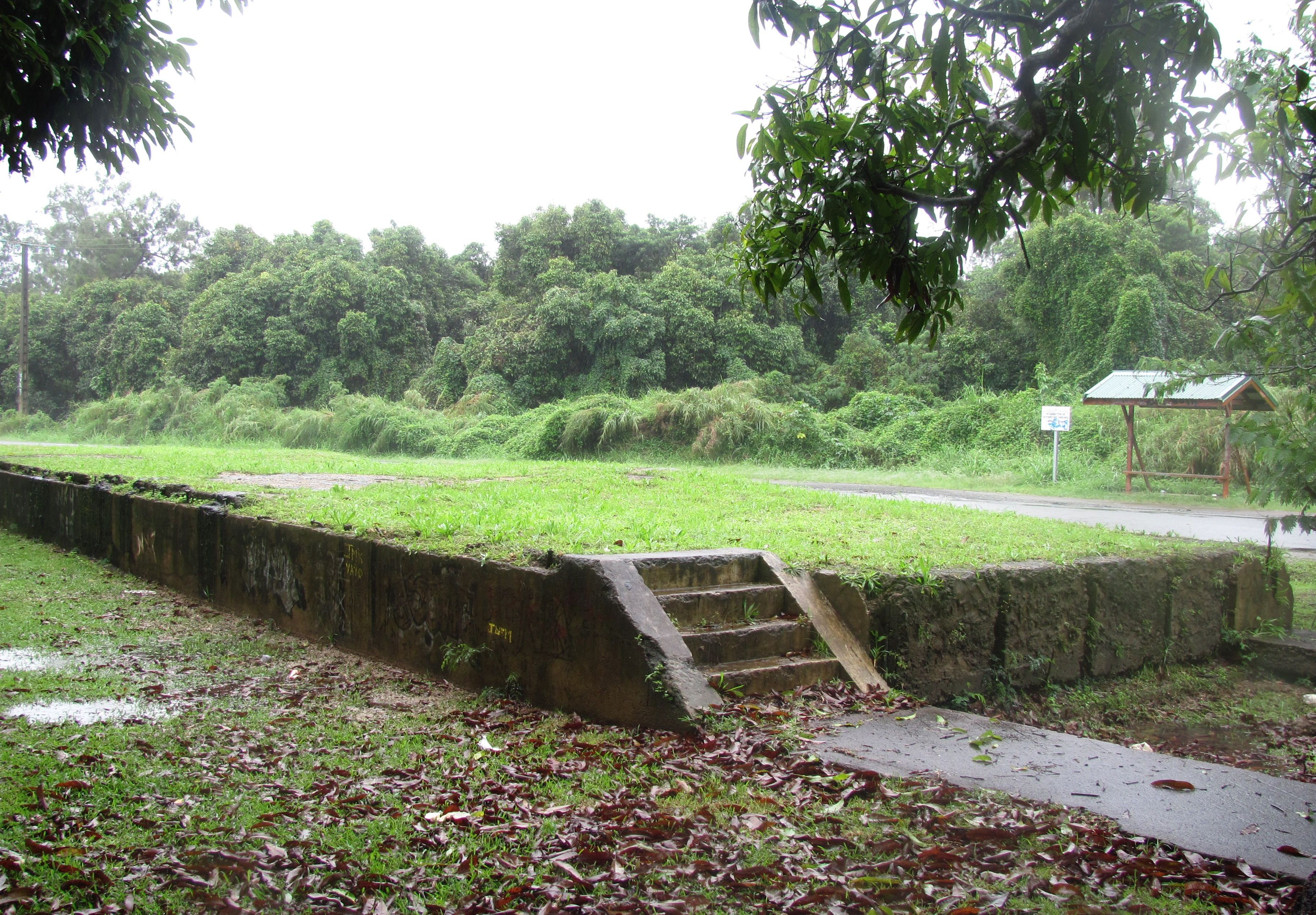
Former railway station

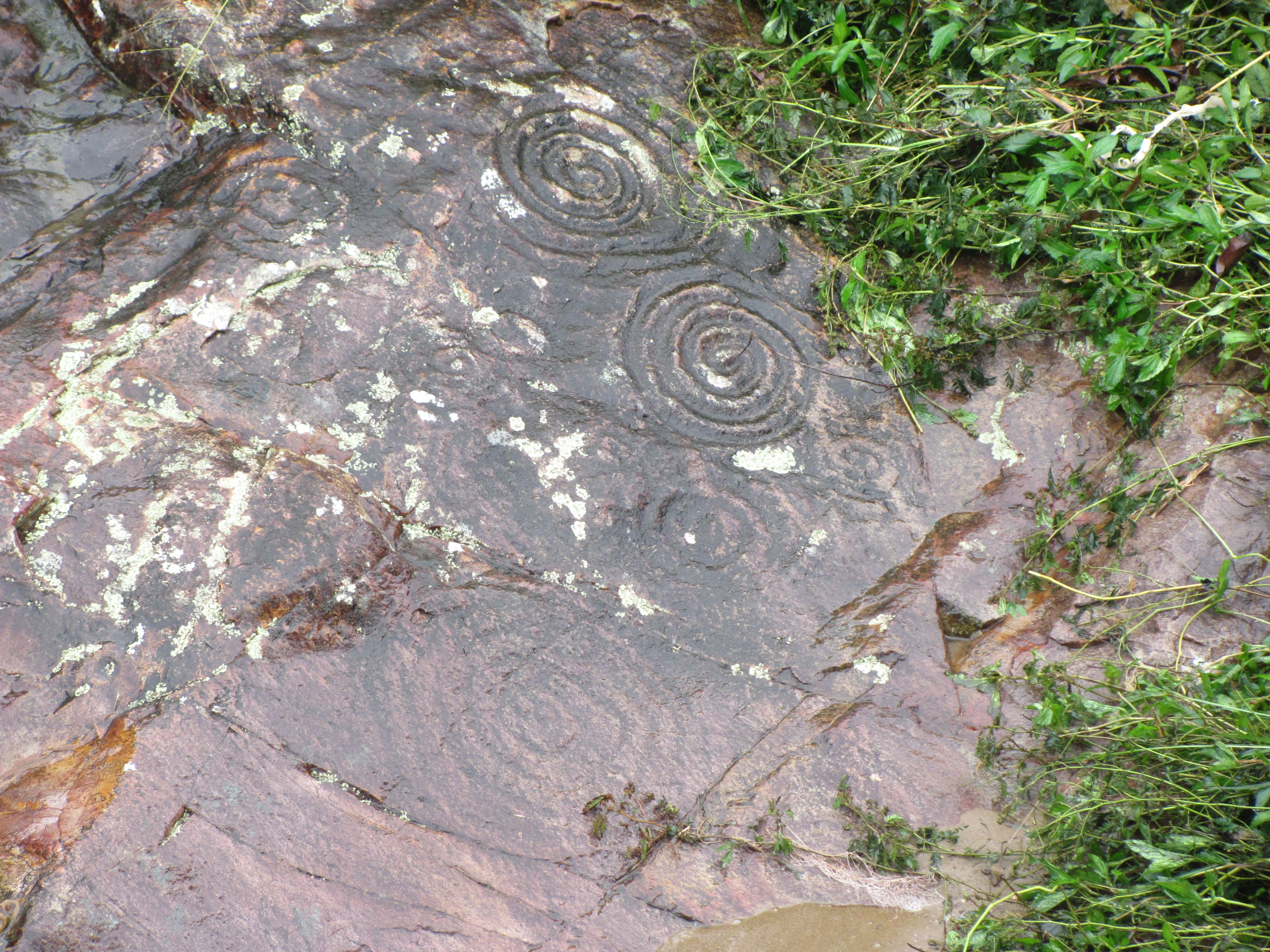
Petroglyphs near Paita

The Catholic church in the centre of Paita was built in 1875. The modern Cultural Centre in the High Street is used for various exhibitions and cultural performances. The Town Hall (Mairie) is close by.

About one mile from the town centre to the north, is the former railway station of the Nouméa-Païta railway where a small locomotive which was used until 1940 can be seen.

In the southeast of Paita petroglyphs possibly dating from the 13th or 14th century B.C. can be seen on a rock at a small river. Some of the petroglyphs look similar to the sun or to flowers. From the road the place can be reached by cement stairs behind a wooden pavilion.
