= Filipe Baravilala =

Fijian footballer

Personal information
- Full name: Filipe Baravilala
- Date of birth: 25 November 1994 (age 31)
- Place of birth: Beqa Island, Fiji
- Height: 1.70 m (5 ft 7 in)
- Position: Defender

Team information
- Current team: Navua
- Number: 19

Senior career*
Years	Team	Apps	(Gls)
–2016	Nadi		
2016–2023	Suva	88	(5)
2016–2025	Navua	25	(3)
2026	Bula FC	9	(0)
2026–	Navua	3	(0)

International career
2015–2016	Fiji U-23	8	(0)
- Fiji Futsal
2018–	Fiji	11	(1)
Medal record
Men's football
Representing Fiji
Pacific Games
Bronze medal – third place	2023 Solomon Islands
MSG Prime Minister's Cup
Winner	2026 Fiji
Runner-up	2024 Solomon Islands
- * Club domestic league appearances and goals as of 19 June 2024

Filipe Baravilala (born 25 November 1994) is a Fijian footballer, Who is playing for Bula FC, He represented Fiji in the football competition at the 2016 Summer Olympics.

== International goals ==
No.	Date	Venue	Opponent	Score	Result	Competition
1.	19 June 2024	HFC Bank Stadium, Suva, Fiji	Samoa	6–1	9–1	2024 OFC Nations Cup

== Honours ==
Fiji

- Pacific Games: Bronze Medalist, 2023
- MSG Prime Minister's Cup: 2026; Runner-up, 2024
