= Elliot Ragomo =

Solomon Islands futsal player

Personal information
- Full name: Elliot Ragomo
- Date of birth: 28 May 1990 (age 36)
- Place of birth: Solomon Islands
- Position: Defender

Team information
- Current team: Minas Tênis Clube
- Number: 3

Senior career*
Years	Team	Apps	(Gls)
2015–2017	Marist		
2017–	Minas Tênis Club		

International career^{‡}
2008–	Solomon Islands Futsal	50	(25)
- * Club domestic league appearances and goals as of 11 November 2017 ‡ National team caps and goals as of 11 November 2017

Elliot Ragomo (born 28 May 1990) is a futsal player from the Solomon Islands. He plays as a defender for Brazilian club Minas Tênis Clube in the Liga Nacional de Futsal and the Solomon Islands national futsal team. Ragomo is the first futsal player from the Solomon Islands who plays professionally. Ragomo currently hold the title of the fastest ever goal scored in an official futsal match. He scored 3 seconds into the match between Kurukuru and New Caledonia in 2009.

== Club career ==
Ragomo came through the youth ranks of Marist and made his debut for the club in 2015. In 2017, he transferred to Brazilian side Minas Tênis Clube.

== International career ==
Ragomo made his debut at the age of 18 for the Solomon Islands national futsal team at the 2008 FIFA Futsal World Cup in a 10–2 loss to Cuba. He has also played for and captained the Kurukuru at the three World Cups that followed.
