= 2013 OFC Futsal Championship =

OFC Futsal Championship Invitational 2013

Tournament details
- Host country: New Zealand
- Dates: 23–27 July 2013
- Teams: 8 (from 2 confederations)
- Venue: Trusts Arena

Final positions
- Champions: Australia (5th title)
- Runners-up: Malaysia
- Third place: New Zealand
- Fourth place: Tahiti

Tournament statistics
- Matches played: 18
- Goals scored: 130 (7.22 per match)

The 2013 OFC Futsal Championship, also known as the OFC Futsal Championship Invitational 2013, was the ninth edition of the main international futsal tournament of the Oceanian region, organized by the Oceania Football Confederation (OFC). It took place from 23 to 27 July 2013, and was hosted by Auckland, New Zealand.

Eight teams took part in the tournament, including Malaysia and Australia (appearing as guest nations) and a 'New Zealand Invitational' side.

== Group stage ==
=== Group A ===
Team	Pld	W	D	L	GF	GA	GD	Pts
Malaysia	3	3	0	0	19	5	+14	9
New Zealand	3	2	0	1	15	13	+2	6
Solomon Islands	3	1	0	2	11	15	−4	3
New Caledonia	3	0	0	3	9	22	−13	0

23 July 2013	New Caledonia	3–8	Malaysia	Trusts Arena, Auckland, New Zealand
18:00 NZST	M. Paulet 19'; L. Parawai 20'; Y. Pourouoro 33' (pen.)	Summary; Full Match	2', 31' A. Hasan; 7' A. Zahari; 12', 31' S. Zamri; 16' Q. Kadir; 20', 34' N. Mohd Ali	Referee: (New Zealand) Campbell Kirk-Waugh

23 July 2013	Solomon Islands	3–7	New Zealand	Trusts Arena, Auckland, New Zealand
20:00 NZST	J. Wetney (yellow card) 19' (yellow-red card) 30'; S. Osifelo 40'; J. Bule 40'; M. Lea'alafa 40'	Summary; Report; Full Match	4', 20', 20', 23', 25' D. Manickum; 33' J. Vaughan; 39' K. Osman	Referee: (Fiji) Amitesh Behari

24 July 2013	Solomon Islands	7–4	New Caledonia	Trusts Arena, Auckland, New Zealand
14:00 NZST	S. Osifelo 9', 27'; C. Makau 13'; J. Bule 15'; E. Ragomo 19', 38'; M. Lea'alafa 23'	Summary; Full Match	14' T. Waima; 19', 29' Y. Pourouoro; 25' E. Saihuliwa	Referee: (New Zealand) Chris Sinclair

24 July 2013	Malaysia	7–1	New Zealand	Trusts Arena, Auckland, New Zealand
20:00 NZST	K. Mohd Bahrin 9', 24'; S. Zamri 11' (yellow card) 18' (yellow-red card) 19'; N. Mohd Ali 12'; A. Hasan 20' (pen.) (yellow card) ?' (yellow-red card) 32'; F. Ambiah 23'; F. Mohamad 26'	Summary; Full Match	20' D. Manickum	Referee: (Australia) Darius Turner

25 July 2013	New Zealand	7–2	New Caledonia	Trusts Arena, Auckland, New Zealand
18:00 NZST	D. Burns 2', 6'; M. Kaouwi 9' (o.g.); D. Manickum 20', 23'; M. Eakins 40' (pen.); J. Sinkora 40'	Summary; Full Match	7' M. Paulet; 16' (pen.) Y. Pourouoro	Referee: (Fiji) Amitesh Behari

25 July 2013	Malaysia	4–1	Solomon Islands	Trusts Arena, Auckland, New Zealand
20:00 NZST	S. Osifelo 14' (o.g.); K. Mohd Bahrin 15', 17'; A. Zahari 25'	Summary; Full Match	31' M. Lea'alafa; (yellow card) ?' (yellow-red card) 32' L. Bisili	Referee: (New Zealand) Chris Sinclair

=== Group B ===
Team	Pld	W	D	L	GF	GA	GD	Pts
Australia	3	3	0	0	17	1	+16	9
Tahiti	3	2	0	1	7	5	+2	6
Vanuatu	3	1	0	2	11	15	−4	3
(New Zealand) NZ Invitational	3	0	0	3	4	18	−14	0

23 July 2013	Tahiti	5–3	Vanuatu	Trusts Arena, Auckland, New Zealand
14:00 NZST	M. Tino 1', 32', 37', 40' (pen.); T. Kaiha 38'	Summary; Full Match	10' N. Iasi; 25' B. Hungai; 27' D. Avock	Referee: (Australia) Ryan Shepheard

23 July 2013	NZ Invitational (New Zealand)	0–9	Australia	Trusts Arena, Auckland, New Zealand
16:00 NZST		Summary; Full Match	2', 27' M. Symington; 8' A. Cooper; 19', 33', 34' M. Musumeci; 23' T. Seeto; 34' D. Fulton; 38' C. Zeballos	Referee: (Solomon Islands) Rex Kamusu

24 July 2013	Tahiti	2–0	(New Zealand) NZ Invitational	Trusts Arena, Auckland, New Zealand
16:00 NZST	M. Faarahia 6'; G. Kavera 36'	Summary; Full Match		Referee: (Fiji) Jainut Dean

24 July 2013	Australia	6–1	Vanuatu	Trusts Arena, Auckland, New Zealand
18:00 NZST	D. Fogarty 8', 29', 31', 35'; M. Symington 23'; A. Cooper 39'	Summary; Full Match	24' A. Tho	Referee: (Fiji) Amitesh Behari

25 July 2013	Vanuatu	7–4	(New Zealand) NZ Invitational	Trusts Arena, Auckland, New Zealand
14:00 NZST	P. Rakom 1', 4', 29'; B. Hungai 3', 4'; D. Dominique 24'; J. John 31'	Summary; Full Match	3' M. Edridge; 25' C. Compaan; 31' J. Fischer; 34' S. Ashby-Peckham	Referee: (Solomon Islands) Rex Kamusu

25 July 2013	Australia	2–0	Tahiti	Trusts Arena, Auckland, New Zealand
16:00 NZST	W. Giovenali 27'; A. Cooper 29'	Summary; Full Match		Referee: (New Zealand) Campbell Kirk-Waugh

== Knockout stage ==
Semi-finals
A1	Malaysia (4p)	3
B2	Tahiti (3p)	3
B1	Australia	2
A2	New Zealand	0

Final
S1	Malaysia	1
S2	Australia	5
3rd place play-off
S1	Tahiti	0
S2	New Zealand	1

26 July 2013 7th place play-off	New Caledonia	2–4	(New Zealand) NZ Invitational	Trusts Arena, Auckland, New Zealand
13:00 NZST	L. Parawi 1'; E. Saihuliwa 7'	Summary; Full Match	4', 11' M. Kamri; 25' (o.g.) Y. Pourouoro; 40' M. Webber	Referee: (Australia) Darius Turner

26 July 2013 5th place play-off	Solomon Islands	11–5	Vanuatu	Trusts Arena, Auckland, New Zealand
15:00 NZST	J. Bule 4', 16', 27', 36'; A. Fa'arodo 6', 20'; G. Stevenson 6', 15'; E. Ragomo 23'; C. Makau 28'; M. Lea'alafah 39'	Summary; Full Match	19' A. Tho; 23', 35' B. Hungai; 24' J. John; 37' P. Rakom	Referee: (Australia) Ryan Shepheard

26 July 2013 Semi-final	Malaysia	3 – 3 (a.e.t.)	Tahiti	Trusts Arena, Auckland, New Zealand
17:00 NZST	F. Mohamad 4', 11'; K. Mohd Bahrin 45' A. Hasan (penalty scored); S. Zamri (penalty missed); A. Zahari (penalty scored); S. Fadzil (penalty scored); F. Mohamad (penalty scored)	Summary; Full Match Penalties; 4 – 3	2' M. Tino; 4' J. Tutavae; 46' A. Tave (penalty scored) A. Toofa; (penalty missed) A. Tave; (penalty scored) T. Kaiha; (penalty missed) G. Kavera; (penalty scored) M. Tino	Referee: (Solomon Islands) Rex Kamusu

26 July 2013 Semi-final	Australia	2–0	New Zealand	Trusts Arena, Auckland, New Zealand
20:00 NZST	D. Fogarty 20'; C. Zeballos 40'	Summary; Full Match		Referee: (Fiji) Amitesh Behari

27 July 2013 Third place play-off	Tahiti	0–1	New Zealand	Trusts Arena, Auckland, New Zealand
17:00 NZST		Summary; Full Match	5' D. Burns	Referee: (Australia) Ryan Shepheard

27 July 2013 Final	Malaysia	1–5	Australia	Trusts Arena, Auckland, New Zealand
20:00 NZST	Q. Kadir 2'; K. Mohd Bahrin (red card) 40'	Summary; Report; Full Match	11', 37', 40' T. Seeto; 29' A. Cooper; 36' W. Giovenali	Referee: (New Zealand) Campbell Kirk-Waugh

Oceanian Futsal Championship
2013 Winners
Australia
5th Title

== Final positions ==
Pos.	Team
1st	Australia
2nd	Malaysia
3rd	New Zealand
4th	Tahiti
5th	Solomon Islands
6th	Vanuatu
7th	(New Zealand) NZ Invitational
8th	New Caledonia

== Awards ==
- Golden Boot

(New Zealand) Dylan Manickum (8 goals)

- Golden Ball

(Australia) Toby Seeto

- Golden Glove

(Australia) Angelo Konstantinou

== Goal scorers ==
8 goals

- (New Zealand) Dylan Manickum

6 goals

- (Solomon Islands) Jeffery Bule

5 goals

- (Australia) Daniel Fogarty
- (Malaysia) Khairul Mohd Bahrin
- (French Polynesia) Yvan Pourouoro
- (French Polynesia) Mote Tino
- (Vanuatu) Ben Hungai

4 goals

- (Australia) Adam Cooper
- (Australia) Toby Seeto
- (Solomon Islands) Micah Lea'alafah
- (Vanuatu) Pakoa Rakom

3 goals

- (Australia) Marino Musumeci
- (Australia) Mark Symington
- (Malaysia) Nizam Mohd Ali
- (Malaysia) Abu Hasan
- (Malaysia) Fawzul Mohamad
- (Malaysia) Shamsul Zamri
- (New Zealand) Daniel Burns
- (Solomon Islands) Samuel Osifelo
- (Solomon Islands) Elliot Ragomo

2 goals

- (Australia) Wade Giovenali
- (Australia) Chris Zeballos
- (Malaysia) Qaiser Abdul Kadir
- (Malaysia) Asmie Zahari
- (New Caledonia) Eric Saihuliwa
- (New Zealand) Mohamed Kamri
- (Solomon Islands) Atana Fa'arodo
- (Solomon Islands) Coleman Makau
- (Solomon Islands) George Stevenson
- (French Polynesia) Malik Paulet
- (Vanuatu) Jacky John
- (Vanuatu) Albert Tho

1 goal

- (Australia) Daniel Fulton
- (Malaysia) Firdaus Ambiah
- (New Caledonia) Thierry Waima
- (New Caledonia) Landry Parawi
- (New Zealand) Stephen Ashby-Peckham
- (New Zealand) Charl Compaan
- (New Zealand) Marvin Eakins
- (New Zealand) Matthew Edridge
- (New Zealand) Jan Fischer
- (New Zealand) Kareem Osman
- (New Zealand) Jakub Sinkora
- (New Zealand) James Vaughan
- (New Zealand) Mitchell Webber
- (French Polynesia) Mana Faarahia
- (French Polynesia) Teivarii Kaiha
- (French Polynesia) Gaby Kavera
- (French Polynesia) Landry Parawai
- (French Polynesia) Antoine Tave
- (French Polynesia) Jacob Tutavae
- (Vanuatu) Donald Avock
- (Vanuatu) Dudley Dominique
- (Vanuatu) Nalpinie Iasi

Own goals

- (Solomon Islands) Samuel Osifelo (for Malaysia)
- (New Caledonia) Mainon Kaouwi (for New Zealand)
- (New Caledonia) Y. Pourouoro (for New Zealand Invitational)

== Match officials ==
Referees

- (Australia) Ryan Shepheard
- (Australia) Darius Turner
- (Fiji) Amitesh Behari
- (Fiji) Jainut Dean
- (New Zealand) Campbell Kirk-Waugh
- (New Zealand) Chris Sinclair
- (Solomon Islands) Rex Kamusu
