= 2004 Oceanian Futsal Championship =

Tournament details
- Host country: Australia
- Dates: 25–29 July 2004
- Teams: 6 (from 1 confederation)
- Venue: 1 (in 1 host city)

Final positions
- Champions: Australia (4th title)
- Runners-up: New Zealand
- Third place: Vanuatu
- Fourth place: Fiji

Tournament statistics
- Matches played: 15
- Goals scored: 95 (6.33 per match)

The 2004 OFC Futsal Championship was the fourth edition of the main international futsal tournament of the Oceanian region. It took place in Canberra, Australia from 25 to 29 July 2004.

The tournament also acted as a qualifying tournament for the 2004 FIFA Futsal World Cup in Chinese Taipei. Australia won the tournament and qualified for the World Cup.

== Championship ==
The six participating teams played each on a single round-robin format. The top team of the group, Australia, won the championship and got a ticket to 2004 Futsal World Cup.

| Team | Pld | W | D | L | GF | GA | GD | Pts |
|---|---|---|---|---|---|---|---|---|
| Australia | 5 | 5 | 0 | 0 | 20 | 0 | +20 | 15 |
| New Zealand | 5 | 4 | 0 | 1 | 22 | 14 | +8 | 12 |
| Vanuatu | 5 | 3 | 0 | 2 | 21 | 11 | +10 | 9 |
| Fiji | 5 | 2 | 0 | 3 | 11 | 11 | 0 | 6 |
| Solomon Islands | 5 | 1 | 0 | 4 | 12 | 31 | −19 | 3 |
| Samoa | 5 | 0 | 0 | 5 | 9 | 28 | −19 | 0 |

Day 1

2004-07-25

| New Zealand | 4 – 2 | Vanuatu |
|---|---|---|
| Bakr Al Saudi ?, ?; Nathan Robertson 19'; Geoff Vilabourouth ? | | Derek Malas ?, 38' |

2004-07-25

| Samoa | 0 – 4 | Fiji |
|---|---|---|
| | | Shalendra Lal ?, ?, ?; Ronald Lal ? |

2004-07-25

| Australia | 9 – 0 | Solomon Islands |
|---|---|---|
| Damian Pilat ?, ?; Ben Singleton ?, ?; Scott Manson ?; Andrew Nolan ?; Danny Ngualufe ?; Lachlan Wright ?; Paul Sau ? (o.g.) |

Day 2

2004-07-26

| Solomon Islands | 6 – 3 | Samoa |
|---|---|---|
| Lloyd Dhawarah ? (pen.); John Iani ?; Danny Ngualufe ?; Varian Ngunua ?; Paul Simon Sau ?; Jerry Sam ? | Report | Junior Michael ?; Dennis Bryce ?; Ki Anufe ? |

2004-07-26

| Fiji | 1 – 5 | Vanuatu |
|---|---|---|
| Ratu Rodu ? | | Derek Males ?; Edward Ben ?; Seule Soromon ?; Phillip Silas ?; own goal ? |

2004-07-26

| New Zealand | 0 – 4 | Australia |
|---|---|---|
| | | Scott Manson ?, ?; Damian Pilat ?; Brett Hewitt ? |

Day 3

2004-07-27

| Samoa | 4 – 7 | Vanuatu |
|---|---|---|
| Junior Michael 24', 26'; Pualele Lemana 13'; Ki Anufe 36' | | Derek Males 8', 29', 30'; Saen Fenai 38', 39'; Louis Dominique 34'; Edward Ben 34' |

Referee: Rakesh Varman (Fiji)
and
Teariki Goodman (Cook Islands)
2004-07-27

| Solomon Islands | 4 – 8 | New Zealand |
|---|---|---|
| Lenci Saeni 17', 28'; Lloyd Drawaran 2'; Richard Fugui 12' | | Nathan Robertson 8', 12', 15', 33', 36'; Aeoni Vilabourouth 16', 17'; Bakr Al Saudi 28' |

Referee: Adrian Tamplin (Australia)
and
Rob Porritt (Australia)
2004-07-27

| Australia | 1 – 0 | Fiji |
|---|---|---|
| Danny Ngaluafe ?, 5' |

Referee: Alian Alick (Vanuatu)
and
Ben Lemana (Samoa)

Day 4

2004-07-28

| Fiji | 2 – 4 | New Zealand |
|---|---|---|
| Michael Lee 10'; Ronald Ram 25' (red card) ?' | | Nathan Robertson 10', 35', 39'; Bakr Al Saudi (9 |

Referee: Ben Lemana (Samoa)
and
and Robert Porritt (Australia)
2004-07-28

| Vanuatu | 7 – 1 | Solomon Islands |
|---|---|---|
| Edward Ben 4', 30'; Bridly Hakwia 16', 25'; Seule Soromon 8'; Saen Fenai 24'; Derek Males 27' | Saen Fenai | Jerry Sam 39' |

Referee: Lyle Hudson (Australia)
and
Adrian Tamplin (Australia)
2004-07-28

| Australia | 5 – 0 | Samoa |
|---|---|---|
| Andrew Nolan 25', 35'; Lachlan Wright 3'; Danny Ngualufe 29'; Scott Manson 31' |

Referee: Alian Alick (Vanuatu)
and
Teariki Goodwin (Cook Islands)

Day 5

2004-07-29

| Fiji | 4 – 1 | Solomon Islands |
|---|---|---|
| Simione Vesa 11', 32'; Michael Lee 13'; Hussain Sahib 16' | | Paul Sau 6' |

Referee: Atufila Talaia (American Samoa)
and
Teariki Goodwin (Cook Islands)
2004-07-29

| Samoa | 2 – 6 | New Zealand |
|---|---|---|
| own goal 8'; Pualele Lemana 36' | | Bakr Al Saudi 17', 31', 34'; Andrew Gwilliam 15', 16'; James Davidson 26' |

Referee: Robert Porritt (Australia)
and
Lyle Hudson (Australia)
2004-07-29

| Vanuatu | 0 – 1 | Australia |
|---|---|---|
| | | Simon Keith 26' |

Referee: Teariki Goodwin (Cook Islands)
and
Rakesh Varman (Fiji)

2004 Oceanian Futsal Championship winners

Australia
Fourth title

== Goalscorers ==
There were 95 goals scored in 15 matches, for an average of 6.33 goals per match.

9 goals

- (New Zealand) Nathan Robertson

7 goals

- (New Zealand) Bakr Al Saudi
- (Vanuatu) Derek Malas

== Match officials ==
Referees

- (American Samoa) Atufila Talaia
- (Australia) Lyle Hudson
- (Australia) Rob Porritt
- (Australia) Adrian Tamplin
- (Cook Islands) Teariki Goodman
- (Fiji) Rakesh Varman
- (Samoa) Ben Lemana
- (Vanuatu) Alian Alick
