= 2014 OFC Futsal Championship =

OFC Futsal Championship Invitational 2014

Tournament details
- Host country: New Caledonia
- Dates: 12–16 August 2014
- Teams: 5 (from 2 confederations)
- Venue: Arène du Sud

Final positions
- Champions: Malaysia (1st title)
- Runners-up: New Caledonia
- Third place: New Zealand
- Fourth place: Tahiti

Tournament statistics
- Matches played: 10
- Goals scored: 67 (6.7 per match)
- Top scorer: (Malaysia) Shamsul Zamri (5 goals)
- Best player(s): (French Polynesia) Smith Tino (New Caledonia) Ivann Pourouoro
- Best goalkeeper: (New Zealand) Atta Elayyan (New Zealand) Elias Billeh
- Fair play award: New Zealand

The 2014 OFC Futsal Championship, also known as the OFC Futsal Championship Invitational 2014, was the tenth edition of the main international futsal tournament of the Oceanian region, organized by the Oceania Football Confederation (OFC). It took place from 12 to 16 August 2014, and was hosted by Païta, New Caledonia.

Five teams took part in the tournament, including Malaysia (appearing as guest nation).

== Squads ==
Each team submitted a squad of 12 players, including two goalkeepers. The squads were announced on 5 August 2014.

== Group stage ==
=== Group ===
| Team | Pld | W | D | L | GF | GA | GD | Pts |
|---|---|---|---|---|---|---|---|---|
| Malaysia | 4 | 3 | 0 | 1 | 21 | 14 | +7 | 9 |
| New Caledonia | 4 | 2 | 1 | 1 | 15 | 13 | +2 | 7 |
| New Zealand | 4 | 2 | 0 | 2 | 10 | 6 | +4 | 6 |
| Tahiti | 4 | 1 | 1 | 2 | 9 | 13 | –4 | 4 |
| Vanuatu | 4 | 1 | 0 | 3 | 12 | 21 | –9 | 3 |

| 12 August 2014 | Malaysia | 1–4 | New Zealand | Arène du Sud, Païta, New Caledonia |
| 18:00 NCST | S. Zamri 11' | Report | J. Fischer 7', 34'; D. Manickum 18'; K. Osman 32' | Referee: (Solomon Islands) Rex Kamusu |

| 12 August 2014 | Vanuatu | 4–1 | Tahiti | Arène du Sud, Païta, New Caledonia |
| 20:00 NCST | P. Rakom 3', 30'; B. Hungai 6'; G. Mahit 20' | Report | T. Tehau 24' | Referee: (New Caledonia) Daniel Kausuo |

| 13 August 2014 | Tahiti | 4–4 | New Caledonia | Arène du Sud, Païta, New Caledonia |
| 18:00 NCST | Sm. Tino 5', 34'; G. Kavera 17'; A. Toofa 34' | Report | E. Saihuliwa 18'; R. Guitton 22'; A. Paulin 27'; I. Pourouroro 36' | Referee: (Solomon Islands) Francis Roni |

| 13 August 2014 | New Zealand | 5–1 | Vanuatu | Arène du Sud, Païta, New Caledonia |
| 20:00 NCST | M. Kamri 9'; J. Fischer 19'; M. Eakins 26', 32'; A. Elayyan 35' | Report | R. Tuigaloa 26' | Referee: (New Caledonia) Stephane Upa |

| 14 August 2014 | New Caledonia | 6–2 | Vanuatu | Arène du Sud, Païta, New Caledonia |
| 18:00 NCST | E. Saihuliwa 12'; I. Pourouoro 13'; I. Bamy 31', 33'; M. Kaouwi 39' | Report | P. Rakom 31'; T. Malapa 40' | Referee: (Solomon Islands) Philip Mana |

| 14 August 2014 | Tahiti | 2–5 | Malaysia | Arène du Sud, Païta, New Caledonia |
| 20:00 NCST | St. Tino 20'; Sm. Tino 39' | Report | F. Ambiah 4'; N. Ali 15'; F. Mohammad 18'; A. Zahari 19'; S. Zamri 22)' | Referee: (Fiji) Amitesh BEHARI |

| 15 August 2014 | Vanuatu | 5–9 | Malaysia | Arène du Sud, Païta, New Caledonia |
| 18:00 NCST | B. Hungai 28', 30'; P. Rakom 29'; D. Dominque 29', 30' | Report | F. Mohammad 2'; F. Yatim 5', 15'; R. Bakri 11'; S. Zamri 2', 30)'; A. Zahari 21', 31'; N. Ali 38' | Referee: (New Zealand) Chris Sinclair |

| 15 August 2014 | New Caledonia | 2–1 | New Zealand | Arène du Sud, Païta, New Caledonia |
| 20:00 NCST | I. Bamy 25'; M. Kaouwi 26' | Report | M. Kamri 15' | Referee: (Fiji) Jainut Dean |

| 16 August 2014 | New Zealand | 0–2 | Tahiti | Arène du Sud, Païta, New Caledonia |
| 18:00 NCST | | Report | T. Tehau 31'; Sm. Tino 39' | Referee: (Fiji) Amitesh Behari |

| 16 August 2014 | Malaysia | 6–3 | New Caledonia | Arène du Sud, Païta, New Caledonia |
| 20:00 NCST | F. Mohammad 22', 39'; A. Zahari 13'; A. Ahmad 16'; N. Ali 18'; S. Zamri 36)' | Report | M. Paulin 6'; R. Guitton 29'; J. Poarairoua 30' | Referee: (New Zealand) Chris Sinclair |

Oceanian Futsal Championship
2014 Winners
Malaysia
1st Title

The following awards were given at the conclusion of the tournament.

| Award | Player |
|---|---|
| Golden Ball | (New Caledonia) Yvan Pourouoro and (French Polynesia) Smith Tino |
| Golden Boot | (Malaysia) Shamsul Zamri |
| Golden Gloves | (New Zealand) Atta Elayyan and (New Zealand) Elias Billeh |
| Fair Play Award | New Zealand |

== Match officials ==
Referees

- (Fiji) Amitesh Behari
- (Fiji) Jainut Dean
- (New Caledonia) Daniel Kausuo
- (New Caledonia) Stephane Upa
- (New Zealand) Chris Sinclair
- (Solomon Islands) Rex Kamusu
- (Solomon Islands) Philip Mana
- (Solomon Islands) Francis Roni
