= 2009 Oceanian Futsal Championship =

Tournament details
- Host country: Fiji
- Dates: 7–11 July 2009
- Teams: 4 (from 1 confederation)

Final positions
- Champions: Solomon Islands (2nd title)
- Runners-up: Fiji
- Third place: Vanuatu
- Fourth place: New Caledonia

Tournament statistics
- Matches played: 8
- Goals scored: 63 (7.88 per match)
- Top scorer(s): (Solomon Islands) Micah Lea’alafa (9 goals)
- Best player: (Solomon Islands) Jack Wetney
- Best goalkeeper: (Solomon Islands) Paul Huia
- Fair play award: Solomon Islands

The 2009 OFC Futsal Championship was the sixth edition of the main international futsal tournament of the Oceanian region. It took place from 7 July to 11 July 2009, and was hosted by Fiji, which had also hosted the previous edition. The number of participating teams dropped from seven to just four, as French Polynesia, New Zealand and Tuvalu failed to return from the previous year's competition. Previously, the Championship had been held every four years; the 2009 edition marked the beginning of an annual tournament.

The defending champions, the Solomon Islands, retained their title, defeating the hosts by eight goals to one in the final.

The tournament's Golden Ball (Player of the tournament) award went to Jack Wetney of the Solomon Islands.

The championship was also notable as it witnessed a new world record for the fastest ever goal scored in an official futsal match. The scorer was Solomon Islands team captain Elliot Ragomo, who scored against New Caledonia three seconds into the game.

== Championship ==
The four teams played one another over the first three days, with the top two advancing to the final, and the other two facing each other for third place.

Teams	GP	W	D	L	GF	GA	GD	Pts
Solomon Islands	3	3	0	0	24	6	+18	9
Fiji	3	2	0	1	8	7	+1	6
New Caledonia	3	1	0	2	9	15	-6	3
Vanuatu	3	0	0	3	5	18	-13	0

=== Group stage ===
2009-07-07

Fiji	2-1	Vanuatu
Sandeep NAIR 30'; 31'		Vira Jack ALA 39';

Referee: Teihotu TAEREA (Tahiti)
2009-07-07

Solomon Islands	8-3	New Caledonia
Elliot RAGOMO 1’, 37’; Francis LAFAI 14’; Micah LEA’ALAFA 22’, 22’; Moffat SIKWA’AE 26’; James EGATA 31’; Jack WETNEY 37’		Anderson PAULIN 14’; Rodrique POIWI 17’; Ismael TCHOVAMILI 18’;

Referee: Amitesh BEHARI (Fiji)
2009-07-08

Fiji	3-5	Solomon Islands
Kamal HASSAN 8', 39'; Mohammed SHALMEEN 38'		Jenan KAPU 14'; Micah LEA'ALAFA 22', 29'; Elliot RAGOMO 30'; Jack WETNEY 35'

2009-07-08

Vanuatu	4-5	New Caledonia
Ben EDWARD 4’; Lui SIFAS 18’, 30’; Ben EDWARD 29’		Anderson PAULIN 5’; Ismael TCHOVAMILI 17’, 29’; Loic CAUNES 20’ 38’;

Referee: Rajinish Dave (Fiji)
2009-07-09

Fiji	3-1	New Caledonia
Kamal HASSAN 7', 10'; Dinesh Chand MUDALIAR 31'		Christophe WHAAP 16'

2009-07-09

Vanuatu	0-11	Solomon Islands
		Elliot RAGOMO 2'; Micah LEA’ALAFA 3', 25'; Jack WETNEY 4', 14', 24', 26'; Stanley PUAIRANA 18'; James EGETA 23', 29'; Moffat SIKWA’AE 30'

=== Third place match ===
2009-07-11

Vanuatu	6-2	New Caledonia
Vira Jack ALA 14', 18', 20'; Don MANSALE ?; Junior MALAS 33'; Lui SIFAS 38'		Ivann POUROUORO 11'; Ismael TCHOVAMILI 18'

Vodafone Arena, Suva

=== Final ===
2009-07-11

Solomon Islands	8-1	Fiji
Micah LEA’ALAFA 13’, 39’; Jenan KAPU 11’; Jack WETNEY 14’,32'; Elliot RAGOMO 14’, 19’; James EGETA 23’		Simione Moce TAMANISAU 16'

Oceanian Futsal Championship
2009 Winners
Solomon Islands
2nd Title

== Awards ==
The following awards were given at the conclusion of the tournament.

Award	Player
Golden Ball	(Solomon Islands) Jack Wetney
Golden Boot	(Solomon Islands) Micah Lea’alafa
Golden Gloves	(Solomon Islands) Paul Huia
Fair Play Award	Solomon Islands

== Goalscorers ==
The sum of individual game score sheets shows same 8 goals for Micah Lea’alafa and Jack Wetney. Game score sheets were checked to the OFC reports. However final OFC report declares 9 goals for Micah Lea’alafa and 7 for Wetney

There were 63 goals scored in 8 matches, for an average of 7.88 goals per match.

9 goals

- (Solomon Islands) Micah Lea’alafa

7 goals

- (Solomon Islands) Jack Wetney

6 goals

- (Solomon Islands) Elliot Ragomo

4 goals

- (Fiji) Kamal Hassan
- (Solomon Islands) James Egeta
- (New Caledonia) Ismael Tchovamili
