= 2018 CONIFA World Football Cup squads =

International football tournament squads

Below are the squads for the 2018 CONIFA World Football Cup.

For the 2018 edition of the CONIFA World Football Cup, the tournament expanded to 16 teams. Preliminary squads were published by CONIFA on 1 May 2018, with the exceptions of Matabeleland and Kabylia, who delayed their squad announcements for political reasons. Felvidék failed to submit their squad by the deadline and left the tournament to be replaced by Kárpátalja. Final squads were published on 16 May 2018.

The number of caps listed for each player does not include any matches played after the start of the 2018 CONIFA World Football Cup. The club listed is the club for which the player last played a competitive match prior to the tournament.

== Group A ==
=== Barawa ===
Head Coach: Abdikarim Farah

No.	Pos.	Player	Date of birth (age)	Caps	Goals	Club
1	GK	Calvin King	18 June 1993 (aged 24)	3	0	Unattached
2	DF	Courtney Austin	11 November 1997 (aged 20)	4	0	(The Football Association) Southall
3	DF	Tarik Kwon	1 September 1999 (aged 18)	1	0	Unattached
4	DF	Zakaria Bachi	24 March 1999 (aged 19)	5	0	(The Football Association) Kensington Borough
5	DF	Ayuub Ali	6 January 1997 (aged 21)	6	0	(The Football Association) Brimsdown
6	MF	Omar Sufi (captain)	16 June 1993 (aged 24)	14	0	Unattached
7	MF	Shaun Lucien	11 March 1992 (aged 26)	1	0	(The Football Association) St Albans City
8	MF	Solomon Sambou	12 December 1995 (aged 22)	1	0	(The Football Association) St Albans City
9	FW	Simon Noel	2 October 1984 (aged 33)	4	1	Unattached
10	MF	Ridwan Hussein	6 January 1998 (aged 20)	9	3	(The Football Association) Brimsdown
12	MF	Frank Keita	15 July 1998 (aged 19)	0	0	Unattached
13	MF	Walid Mahamud Hirsi	2 January 1981 (aged 37)	1	0	Unattached
14	FW	Jeylani Sufi	7 May 1987 (aged 31)	10	6	(The Football Association) London Rangers
15	MF	Gianni Crichlow	6 May 1998 (aged 20)	2	0	Unattached
16	MF	Wadah Ahmidi	6 July 1991 (aged 26)	2	0	(The Football Association) Staines Town
17	MF	Shaquille Ismail	19 November 1999 (aged 18)	8	2	(The Football Association) Wealdstone
18	DF	Said Tahir	2 June 1998 (aged 19)	8	0	Unattached
19	FW	Mohamed Bettamer	1 April 1993 (aged 25)	1	0	Unattached
20	MF	Aryan Tajbakhsh	27 October 1990 (aged 27)	3	1	(The Football Association) Crawley Town
21	FW	Dahir Ali	12 September 2000 (aged 17)	12	6	Unattached
22	MF	Mohamed Arale	10 March 2000 (aged 18)	2	0	Unattached
23	GK	Hafed Al Droubi	30 March 1995 (aged 23)	1	0	(The Football Association) Chesham United
24	FW	Adulfat Aliyev	3 January 1979 (aged 39)	0	0	(Association of Football Federations of Azerbaijan) Bakili

=== Cascadia ===
Head Coach: (England) James Nichols

No.	Pos.	Player	Date of birth (age)	Caps	Goals	Club
1	GK	Will Marment	16 October 1998 (aged 19)	0	0	(United States Soccer Federation) Vassar College
2	DF	James Riley (Captain)	27 October 1982 (aged 35)	0	0	Unattached
3	MF	Charlie Gregory	27 December 1991 (aged 26)	0	0	(The Football Association) Sporting Bengal United
4	DF	Matt Braem	25 June 1994 (aged 23)	0	0	(United States Soccer Federation) AFC Ann Arbor
5	DF	Patrick Wilson	16 May 1986 (aged 32)	0	0	(The Football Association) Hamble Club
6	MF	Jordan Wilson	31 October 1991 (aged 26)	0	0	(Danish Football Association) Nykøbing FC
7	MF	Anthony Wright	10 November 1997 (aged 20)	0	0	(The Football Association) Banbury United
8	MF	Josh Doughty	8 April 1997 (aged 21)	0	0	Unattached
9	FW	Calum Ferguson	16 February 1995 (aged 23)	0	0	(Scottish Football Association) Elgin City
10	MF	Hector Morales	19 January 1993 (aged 25)	0	0	(United States Soccer Federation) AFC Ann Arbor
11	FW	Keaton Levock	17 October 1994 (aged 23)	0	0	(United States Soccer Federation) Carpathia FC
12	GK	Alejandro De La Torre	7 May 1999 (aged 19)	0	0	(United States Soccer Federation) Round Rock
13	DF	Sofien El-Mehrik	15 December 1993 (aged 24)	0	0	Unattached
14	FW	Jon Nouble	19 January 1996 (aged 22)	0	0	Unattached
15	DF	Ellis Routledge	25 October 1999 (aged 18)	0	0	(The Football Association) Wingate & Finchley
16	MF	Brian Simpson	24 May 1998 (aged 19)	0	0	(The Football Association) Hertford Town
17	DF	Julius Lansiquot	6 November 1999 (aged 18)	0	0	(The Football Association) Barnet
18	FW	Hamza Haddadi	31 January 1994 (aged 24)	0	0	(United States Soccer Federation) Kitsap Pumas
19	FW	Yuri Farkas	21 July 1993 (age 33)	0	0	(United States Soccer Federation) AFC Ann Arbor
20	DF	Joey Censoni	3 September 1999 (age 27)	0	0	(United States Soccer Federation) Carpathia FC
21	MF	Tayshan Hayden-Smith	23 September 1996 (age 29)	0	0	(The Football Association) Northwood
22	MF	Nikko Stokes	16 July 2000 (age 26)	0	0	(The Football Association) Waltham Forest
23	MF	Max Oldham	8 July 1993 (age 33)	0	0	(The Football Association) Corinthian-Casuals

=== Ellan Vannin ===
Head Coach: (England) Chris Bass, Sr

No.	Pos.	Player	Date of birth (age)	Caps	Club	
1	GK	Andy Perry	19 May 1982 (aged 36)	14	0	(Isle of Man Football Association) St Georges
2	DF	Sam Caine	26 May 1988 (aged 30)	15	(Isle of Man) St Georges	
3	MF	Joel Ibañez	2 October 1993 (aged 24)	4	(Isle of Man) St Georges	
4	DF	Sean Quaye	19 August 1984 (aged 33)	15	(Isle of Man) St Georges	
5	MF	Daniel Simpson	28 July 1995 (aged 22)	4	(Isle of Man) Corinthians	
6	MF	Joey Quayle	4 March 1999 (aged 19)	2	(Isle of Man) St Georges	
7	DF	Tom Callister	28 March 1994 (aged 24)	0	(Isle of Man) Corinthians	
8	MF	Frank Jones (captain)	22 October 1987 (aged 30)	27	(Isle of Man) St Georges	
9	FW	Ciaran McNulty	1 July 1987 (aged 30)	12	(Isle of Man) St Georges	
10	MF	Alex Holden	12 January 1996 (aged 22)	4	(England) Bottesford Town	
11	MF	Joey Morling	3 January 1997 (aged 21)	9	(Isle of Man) St Georges	
12	MF	Ryan Burns	18 March 1994 (aged 24)	0	(Isle of Man) Corinthians	
14	DF	Jack McVey	13 January 1991 (aged 27)	18	(Isle of Man) St Georges	
15	DF	Darren Cain	2 April 1988 (aged 30)	0	(Isle of Man) Corinthians	
16	FW	Stephen Whitley	20 February 1995 (aged 23)	7	3	(Isle of Man Football Association) Corinthians
17	DF	Cameron Lee	22 August 1993 (aged 24)	0	(Isle of Man) Corinthians	
20	FW	Furo Davies	21 December 1988 (aged 29)	7	(Isle of Man) St Georges	
21	MF	Mike Williams	19 August 1994 (aged 23)	6	(Isle of Man) Rushen United	
22	MF	Brodie Patience	7 February 1998 (aged 20)	0	0	(Isle of Man Football Association) Corinthians
23	FW	Sean Doyle	11 July 1994 (aged 23)	4	3	(Isle of Man Football Association) Corinthians
24	DF	Andrew Burkitt	3 August 2000 (aged 17)	0	0	(Isle of Man Football Association) Laxey
25	GK	Dean Kearns	17 June 1993 (aged 24)	2	0	(Isle of Man Football Association) Rushen United

=== Tamil Eelam ===
Head Coach: (Tamil Eelam) Ragesh Nambiar

No.	Pos.	Player	Date of birth (age)	Caps	Goals	Club
1	GK	Umaesh Sundaralingam	20 September 1992 (aged 25)	8	0	(Canadian Soccer Association) FC Supernova
2	MF	Mahy Nambiar	2 February 1995 (aged 23)	10	0	(The Football Association) MC United
3	MF	Johnath Chandran	30 September 1992 (aged 25)	4	0	(German Football Association) TSV Neuenstadt
4	DF	Prasanna Premendra	9 June 1995 (aged 22)	1	0	(The Football Association) Loughborough University
5	DF	Piraburaj Jayabalakrishnan	20 August 1993 (aged 24)	1	0	(French Football Federation) FC Bourget
6	MF	Mayooran Chelliah	8 April 1991 (aged 27)	5	0	(French Football Federation) CS Eelavar
7	MF	Gonas Panneerselvam	12 January 1994 (aged 24)	2	0	(German Football Association) TuS Bilfingen
8	MF	Panushanth Kulenthiran (captain)	26 July 1990 (aged 27)	7	8	(Italian Football Federation) AC Senna Gloria
9	FW	Prashanth Ragavan	21 August 1991 (aged 26)	9	6	(French Football Federation) Drancy United
10	DF	Nirunthan Sivananthan	13 October 1995 (aged 22)	3	0	(Canadian Soccer Association) Alliance United
11	FW	Gvinthan Navaneethakrishnan	28 March 1990 (aged 28)	10	5	(German Football Association) SV Kickers Büchig
12	GK	Robert Osman	30 June 1990 (aged 27)	1	0	(The Football Association) Epsom Athletic
13	DF	Kevin Nagendra	15 September 1993 (aged 24)	8	0	(The Football Association) East London Elite
14	FW	Kabilan Sithamparasakthi	16 June 1995 (aged 22)	1	0	(Swiss Football Association) SK Root
15	MF	Janothan Perananthan	20 July 1994 (aged 23)	3	1	(The Football Association) Surbiton Sports
16	FW	Kasthuran Chelliah	9 August 1990 (aged 27)	2	1	(Royal Dutch Football Association) WDS'19
17	FW	Nitharshan Ratnam	12 March 1998 (aged 20)	1	0	(The Football Association) Santos FC
18	FW	Dushiyan Sathiyaseelan	15 May 1999 (aged 19)	0	0	(The Football Association) UK Tamil Students Union
19	MF	Lathoosan Jeyathevan	28 December 1998 (aged 19)	0	0	(The Football Association) UK Tamil Students Union
20	FW	Caliston Calistus	25 January 1997 (aged 21)	0	0	(The Football Association) Santos FC
21	MF	Janojan Pathmanathan	17 January 1996 (aged 22)	0	0	(The Football Association) Santos FC
22	DF	Santhosh Sornalingam	27 January 1987 (aged 31)	0	0	(The Football Association) MC United
23	DF	Jeyasiva Sivapathasundaram	23 March 1988 (aged 30)	2	0	(The Football Association) Harlow Town

== Group B ==
=== Abkhazia ===
Head Coach: (Abkhazia) Beslan Ajinjal

No.	Pos.	Player	Date of birth (age)	Caps	Goals	Club
1	GK	Aleksei Bondarenko	15 November 1978 (aged 39)	22	0	(Football Federation of Abkhazia) Gagra
3	FW	Ruslan Shoniya	1 November 1993 (aged 24)	10	5	(Russian Football Union) Vityaz
4	MF	Georgi Zhanaa	28 January 1995 (aged 23)	15	0	(Football Federation of Abkhazia) Nart Sukhum
6	MF	Mykyta Filatov	24 June 1992 (aged 25)	0	0	(Football Federation of Abkhazia) Nart Sukhum
7	MF	Shabat Logua	22 March 1995 (aged 23)	18	3	(Football Federation of Abkhazia) Nart Sukhum
8	MF	Tarash Khagba	14 January 1991 (aged 27)	18	3	(Football Federation of Abkhazia) Dinamo Sukhum
9	MF	Astamur Tarba	24 May 1987 (aged 31)	18	2	(Football Federation of Abkhazia) Ritsa
10	FW	Vladimir Argun	16 May 1991 (aged 27)	18	2	(Football Federation of Abkhazia) Nart Sukhum
11	FW	Viktor Pimpiia	15 December 1998 (aged 19)	4	1	(Football Federation of Abkhazia) Ritsa
12	MF	Alan Khugayev	31 August 1991 (aged 26)	13	0	(Russian Football Union) Spartak Vladikavkaz
13	MF	Astamur Tsishba	23 February 1988 (aged 30)	13	1	(Football Federation of Abkhazia) Gagra
14	MF	Anatoli Semyonov	23 February 1988 (aged 30)	5	2	(Football Federation of Abkhazia) Gagra
15	FW	Dmitri Maskayev	27 December 1987 (aged 30)	0	0	(Russian Football Union) Torpedo Moscow
16	GK	Itsal Katsuba	21 September 1995 (age 30)	8	0	(Football Federation of Abkhazia) Nart Sukhum
17	DF	Anri Khagba	7 January 1992 (aged 26)	17	0	(Football Federation of Abkhazia) Nart Sukhum
20	DF	Anri Khagush	23 September 1986 (aged 31)	5	0	(Russian Football Union) Arsenal Tula
22	DF	Diyego Malaniya	11 February 1991 (aged 27)	0	0	(Russian Football Union) FSK Dolgoprudny
23	FW	Ruslan Akhvlediani	8 December 1987 (aged 30)	0	0	(Russian Football Union) Metallurg Lipetsk
77	MF	Aleksandr Kogoniya	24 August 1995 (aged 22)	5	1	(Football Federation of Abkhazia) Nart Sukhum

=== Kárpátalja ===
Head Coach: István Sándor

No.	Pos.	Player	Date of birth (age)	Caps	Goals	Club
1	GK	Béla Fejér	11 May 1995 (aged 23)	0	0	(Romanian Football Federation) Sepsi OSK
3	MF	Roland Szabó	7 March 1994 (aged 24)	4	0	(Hungarian Football Federation) Nyírbátori FC
4	DF	László Rácz	20 October 1996 (aged 21)	0	0	(Hungarian Football Federation) SZEOL
5	MF	György Sándor	20 March 1984 (aged 34)	0	0	(Hungarian Football Federation) Aqvital FC Csákvár
7	FW	Norbert Angyal	28 May 1992 (aged 26)	0	0	(Hungarian Football Federation) Szolnoki MÁV FC
8	MF	Zoltán Baksa (captain)	2 January 1983 (aged 35)	4	1	(Hungarian Football Federation) Cigánd SE
9	MF	Gergő Gyürki	3 October 1993 (aged 24)	0	0	(Hungarian Football Federation) FC Sopron
10	MF	István Sándor	4 January 1986 (aged 32)	0	0	(Hungarian Football Federation) Ceglédi VSE
11	MF	Zsolt Gajdos	4 February 1993 (aged 25)	0	0	(Hungarian Football Federation) Nyíregyháza Spartacus FC
12	FW	Tibor Molnár	12 May 1993 (aged 25)	0	0	(Hungarian Football Federation) Aqvital FC Csákvár
13	DF	Robert Molnar	24 June 1991 (aged 26)	0	0	(Hungarian Football Federation) Kisvárda FC
14	DF	Milán Lászik	20 November 1996 (aged 21)	0	0	(Hungarian Football Federation) SZEOL
16	MF	Kristóf Késmárki	4 January 1998 (aged 20)	0	0	(Hungarian Football Federation) Paksi FC
17	MF	Ronald Takács	26 January 1998 (aged 20)	0	0	(Hungarian Football Federation) MTK Budapest FC
18	MF	Alex Svedjuk	11 July 1996 (aged 21)	0	0	(Hungarian Football Federation) Békéscsaba 1912 Előre
19	DF	Sándor Szidor	17 June 1999 (aged 18)	0	0	(Hungarian Football Federation) Tarpa SC
20	GK	Szergej Petranics	22 March 1972 (aged 46)	0	0	Retired
21	DF	Csaba Peres	20 October 1996 (aged 21)	0	0	(Hungarian Football Federation) Ceglédi VSE
22	MF	György Toma	27 April 1996 (aged 22)	0	0	(Hungarian Football Federation) Cigánd SE

=== Northern Cyprus ===
Head Coach: (Northern Cyprus) Mustafa Borataş

No.	Pos.	Player	Date of birth (age)	Caps	Goals	Club
1	GK	Hasan Piro	2 October 1983 (aged 34)	20	0	(Cyprus Turkish Football Association) Alsancak Yeşilova
3	DF	Necati Gench	21 November 1999 (aged 18)	0	0	(The Football Association) London Yeni Boğaziçi
4	DF	Serhan Önet	26 August 1981 (aged 36)	25	1	(Cyprus Turkish Football Association) Çetinkaya
6	MF	Fırat Ersalan	11 May 1986 (aged 32)	10	0	(Cyprus Turkish Football Association) Cihangir
7	MF	Yasin Kurt	14 March 1988 (aged 30)	0	0	(Cyprus Turkish Football Association) Mağusa Türk Gücü
8	DF	Çağrı Kıral	11 February 1989 (aged 29)	20	0	(Cyprus Turkish Football Association) Lefke
9	FW	Tansel Ekingen	29 September 1986 (aged 31)	10	2	(Cyprus Turkish Football Association) Yenicami
10	MF	Halil Turan	28 November 1986 (aged 31)	15	10	(Cyprus Turkish Football Association) Mağusa Türk Gücü
11	MF	Mehmet Altun	5 September 1997 (aged 20)	2	0	(Cyprus Turkish Football Association) Yenicami
12	DF	Salih Say	10 March 1981 (aged 37)	12	0	(Cyprus Turkish Football Association) Cihangir
13	DF	Hüseyin Sadıklar	13 August 1986 (aged 31)	10	1	(Cyprus Turkish Football Association) Yenicami
15	MF	Mehmet Erol	1 January 1998 (aged 20)	10	0	(Cyprus Turkish Football Association) Binatlı
17	DF	Aykut Esmeraslan	28 March 1992 (aged 26)	5	0	(Cyprus Turkish Football Association) Lefke
18	DF	Ahmet Sönmez	30 June 1987 (aged 30)	10	0	(Cyprus Turkish Football Association) Doğan Türk Birliği
19	MF	Kenan Oshan	27 December 1995 (aged 22)	12	3	(Cyprus Turkish Football Association) Doğan Türk Birliği
20	FW	Uğur Gök	22 October 1990 (aged 27)	15	5	(Cyprus Turkish Football Association) Küçük Kaymaklı
33	DF	Arif Uysal	27 April 1996 (aged 22)	0	0	(Cyprus Turkish Football Association) Mağusa Türk Gücü
69	GK	Erdoğan Nay	16 July 1997 (aged 20)	2	0	(Cyprus Turkish Football Association) Baf Ülkü Yurdu
88	DF	Adil Uçar	20 August 1989 (aged 28)	5	0	(Cyprus Turkish Football Association) Mağusa Türk Gücü
90	FW	Ahmet Sivri	6 July 1999 (aged 18)	2	1	(Turkish Football Federation) Galatasaray
91	MF	Ünal Kaya	8 June 1991 (aged 26)	8	1	(Cyprus Turkish Football Association) Yenicami
94	GK	Ozan Mercan	22 April 1994 (aged 24)	2	0	(Cyprus Turkish Football Association) Doğan Türk Birliği
99	FW	Billy Mehmet	3 January 1985 (aged 33)	0	0	(Cyprus Turkish Football Association) Alsancak Yeşilova

=== Tibet ===
Head Coach: Penpa Tsering

No.	Pos.	Player	Date of birth (age)	Caps	Goals	Club
1	GK	Tenzin Samdup	23 December 1992 (aged 25)	7	0	(Tibetan National Football Association) DYSA Mundgod
2	MF	Thupten Tsering	17 January 1994 (aged 24)	0	0	Unattached
3	DF	Tenzin Bhakdo	5 August 1996 (aged 21)	3	1	(Tibetan National Football Association) DYSA Mundgod
4	MF	Tenzin Loedup	21 December 1991 (aged 26)	2	0	Unattached
5	DF	Gelek Wangchuk	15 September 1992 (aged 25)	3	0	Unattached
6	MF	BK Narayan	25 November 1991 (aged 26)	7	0	Unattached
7	FW	Tsering Chomphel	18 November 1992 (age 33)	2	0	Unattached
8	DF	Tenzin Dhondup	7 January 1995 (aged 23)	0	0	(Canadian Soccer Association) George Brown Huskies
9	FW	Pema Lhundup	11 February 1996 (aged 22)	2	0	(Tibetan National Football Association) Gangtok FC
10	FW	Tenzin Thardoe	15 March 1998 (aged 20)	2	0	(Tibetan National Football Association) TDL FC
11	FW	Kalsang Topgyal	24 December 1996 (age 29)	3	1	(Tibetan National Football Association) Gulladhalla FC
12	MF	Khalsang Lungkara	5 September 1995 (aged 22)	0	0	(All India Football Federation) Shillong United
14	MF	Karma Tsewang	10 January 1988 (age 38)	2	1	Unattached
15	DF	Tenzin Gelek	10 May 1989 (age 37)	2	0	Unattached
16	FW	Tenzin Norbu Tekhang	13 June 1996 (age 30)	0	0	(Tibetan National Football Association) Dhondupling FC
17	MF	Ruden Tshering Bhutia	12 November 1991 (aged 26)	0	0	Unattached
18	DF	Tenzin Yougyal	12 August 1993 (age 33)	0	0	(United States Soccer Federation) Zum Schneider FC 03
19	DF	Tenzin Choepak	7 January 1996 (age 30)	0	0	Unattached
20	FW	Tashi Samphel	6 May 1987 (age 39)	1	5	(Tibetan National Football Association) Gangtok FC
21	GK	Sangye Gyatso	6 May 1987 (age 39)	2	0	(All India Football Federation) German Football Academy
22	FW	Tenzin Tsering	16 November 1995 (age 30)	2	0	(Tibetan National Football Association) Rabgayling FC
23	DF	Dawa Tashi	16 April 1987 (age 39)	6	0	Unattached

== Group C ==
=== Matabeleland ===
Head Coach: (England) Justin Walley

No.	Pos.	Player	Date of birth (age)	Caps	Goals	Club
1	GK	Thandazani Mdlongwa	8 January 1988 (age 38)	18	0	(Zimbabwe Football Association) Victory United
2	DF	Michael Sibindi	13 September 1992 (age 33)	9	0	Unattached
3	MF	Bekithemba Moyo	25 April 1987 (age 39)	16	11	Unattached
4	DF	Khulekani Maziwa	15 September 1988 (age 37)	24	7	Unattached
5	MF	Godwin Ndlovu	11 December 1988 (age 37)	3	0	Unattached
6	DF	Mthulisi Mbizo	24 September 1994 (age 31)	17	1	(Zimbabwe Football Association) Lupane State
7	MF	Andisiwe Sibindi	14 June 1986 (age 40)	19	1	Unattached
8	MF	Sawusani Mudimba	12 May 1997 (age 29)	10	13	(Zimbabwe Football Association) FMSA Umguza
10	MF	Oscar George	7 January 1996 (age 30)	24	6	Unattached
11	MF	Romeo Sibanda	1 April 1990 (age 36)	4	0	Unattached
12	DF	Sipho Mlalazi	14 September 1991 (age 34)	20	9	Unattached
13	GK	Bruce Sithole	7 April 1991 (age 35)	1	0	Unattached
14	DF	Praise Ndlovu (captain)	12 July 1993 (age 33)	20	0	Unattached
15	DF	Mthulusi Dube	8 September 1995 (age 31)	3	0	Unattached
16	DF	Musa Sthamburi				
17	MF	Thomas Nkomo	25 September 1989 (age 36)	18	5	Unattached
18	FW	Shylock Ndlovu	8 March 1990 (age 36)	10	8	Unattached
19	FW	Thabiso Ndlela	10 September 1996 (age 30)	8	7	Unattached
20	FW	Dumenkosini Ndlovu	1 August 1996 (age 30)	7	3	(Zimbabwe Football Association) CIWU
21	FW	Professor Tshuma	27 April 1990 (age 36)	23	10	Unattached
22	FW	Mduduzi Mpofu	30 September 1996 (age 29)	23	13	(Zimbabwe Football Association) Victory United
29	GK	Notice Dube	26 November 1988 (age 37)	7	0	(Zimbabwe Football Association) Makomo FC
96	GK	Bruce Grobbelaar	6 October 1957 (aged 60)	0	0	Retired

=== Padania ===
Head Coach: (Italy) Arturo Merlo

No.	Pos.	Player	Date of birth (age)	Caps	Goals	Club
1	GK	Marco Murriero	20 January 1983 (aged 35)	5	0	(Italian Football Federation) Derthona
2	DF	Michele Bonfanti	7 January 1992 (aged 26)	0	0	(Italian Football Federation) Arconatese
3	DF	Nicolas Dossi	26 June 1997 (aged 20)	4	0	(Italian Football Federation) Grumellese
4	MF	Gianluca Rolandone	19 January 1989 (aged 29)	8	0	(Italian Football Federation) Castellazzo
5	DF	Stefano Tignonsini	25 November 1981 (aged 36)	18	2	(Italian Football Federation) Valcalepio
6	MF	Stefano Baldan	29 May 1991 (aged 26)	0	0	(Italian Football Federation) ASD NibionnOggiono
7	FW	Ersid Plumbaj	26 April 1989 (aged 29)	4	1	(Italian Football Federation) Virtus Bergamo
8	MF	Andrea Rota	10 October 1976 (age 49)	17	7	(Italian Football Federation) Castellanzese
9	FW	Federico Corno	6 April 1989 (age 37)	0	0	(Italian Football Federation) Caronnese
10	MF	Giacomo Innocenti	1 August 1989 (age 37)	5	5	(Italian Football Federation) Castellazzo
11	MF	Gabriele Piantoni	11 September 1988 (age 37)	4	0	(Italian Football Federation) Grumellese
12	GK	Riccardo Zarri	21 December 1997 (age 28)	1	0	(United States Soccer Federation) Greensboro Spartans
13	DF	Roberto Rudi	13 April 1987 (age 39)	8	0	(Italian Football Federation) Varese Calcio
14	MF	Nicola Mazzotti	6 February 1987 (age 39)	7	1	(Italian Football Federation) Fiorenzuola
15	DF	Nicolò Pavan	11 September 1993 (age 32)	0	0	(Italian Football Federation) Chieri
16	FW	William Rosset	13 February 1983 (age 43)	10	2	(Italian Football Federation) Castellazzo
17	DF	Marius Stankevičius	15 July 1981 (age 45)	0	0	(Italian Football Federation) Crema
18	FW	Giulio Valente	24 June 1992 (age 34)	3	0	(Italian Football Federation) Inveruno
19	MF	Marco Garavelli	4 March 1981 (age 45)	15	5	(Italian Football Federation) Casale
20	DF	Luca Ferri	19 March 1980 (age 46)	11	1	(Italian Football Federation) Caravaggio
21	FW	Riccardo Ravasi	9 December 1994 (age 31)	0	0	(Italian Football Federation) Grumellese
22	DF	Danny Magnè	21 May 1990 (age 36)	12	0	(Italian Football Federation) Arquatese
23	FW	Asante Gullit Okyere	23 May 1988 (age 38)	0	0	(Italian Football Federation) Giana Erminio

=== Székely Land ===
Head Coach: (Székely Land) Róbert Ilyés

No.	Pos.	Player	Date of birth (age)	Caps	Goals	Club
1	GK	Adrian Horvát	26 January 1990 (age 36)	4	0	(Romanian Football Federation) FK Miercurea Ciuc
2	DF	Szabolcs Kilyén	19 March 1998 (age 28)	0	0	(Romanian Football Federation) FC Viitorul Constanța
3	DF	Csaba Csizmadia	30 May 1985 (age 41)	5	0	(Hungarian Football Federation) Budafoki MTE
4	DF	Zsolt Tankó	21 July 1997 (age 29)	0	0	(Romanian Football Federation) KSE Târgu Secuiesc
5	MF	Szabolcs Kis	26 September 1989 (age 36)	8	0	(Hungarian Football Federation) Csornai SE
6	DF	Dénes Csíki	26 January 1983 (age 43)	16	2	(Romanian Football Federation) AFC Odorheiu Secuiesc
7	FW	László Hodgyai	18 January 1992 (age 34)	7	5	(Romanian Football Federation) FK Miercurea Ciuc
8	MF	Attila Csürös	15 February 1995 (age 31)	7	2	(Romanian Football Federation) FK Miercurea Ciuc
9	FW	László Szőcs	10 October 1984 (age 41)	9	6	(Romanian Football Federation) FK Odorheiu Secuiesc
10	MF	Róbert Ilyés	4 February 1974 (age 52)	6	0	(Romanian Football Federation) FK Miercurea Ciuc
11	MF	Arthur Györgyi	12 March 1997 (age 29)	5	0	(Romanian Football Federation) FK Miercurea Ciuc
12	GK	Barna Nagy	3 September 1991 (age 35)	3	0	(Romanian Football Federation) FK Miercurea Ciuc
13	MF	Loránd Szőcs	3 March 1978 (age 48)	15	0	(Romanian Football Federation) Imperial Wet Futsal
14	DF	Árpád Rózsa	18 June 1989 (age 37)	12	0	(Romanian Football Federation) AS Unirea Cristuru Secuiesc
15	DF	Norbert Benkő-Biró	8 October 1992 (age 33)	9	0	(Romanian Football Federation) FK Miercurea Ciuc
16	MF	Szilárd Mitra	9 January 1987 (age 39)	0	0	(Romanian Football Federation) FK Miercurea Ciuc
17	FW	Barna Bajkó	16 May 1984 (age 42)	7	5	(Romanian Football Federation) FK Miercurea Ciuc
18	MF	József Gazda	26 October 1982 (age 43)	10	1	(Romanian Football Federation) KSE Târgu Secuiesc
19	MF	Lóránd Fülöp	24 July 1997 (age 29)	0	0	(Romanian Football Federation) FC Botoșani
20	FW	István Fülöp	May 18, 1990 (age 36)	0	0	(Romanian Football Federation) Sepsi OSK
21	GK	Pál Somogyi	6 July 1999 (age 27)	0	0	(Hungarian Football Federation) Békéscsaba Labdarúgó Akadémia
22	FW	Balázs Csiszér	3 March 1999 (age 27)	5	0	(Romanian Football Federation) FK Miercurea Ciuc
23	MF	Szilárd Magyari	20 May 1998 (age 28)	4	3	(Romanian Football Federation) FK Miercurea Ciuc

=== Tuvalu ===
Head Coach: (Tuvalu) Lopati Taupili

No.	Pos.	Player	Date of birth (age)	Caps	Goals	Club
1	GK	Katepu Iosua	May 11, 1988 (age 38)	8	0	(Tuvalu Islands Football Association) Tofaga
2	DF	Kalamelu Seloto	February 24, 1992 (age 34)	4	0	(Tuvalu Islands Football Association) Nauti
3	DF	Paolo Taitai	September 2, 1996 (age 30)	5	0	(Tuvalu Islands Football Association) Tamanuku
4	DF	Meauke Tuilagi	September 5, 1997 (age 29)	4	0	(Tuvalu Islands Football Association) Niutao
5	DF	Geoffrey Maleko	January 27, 1992 (age 34)	0	0	(Tuvalu Islands Football Association) Nauti
6	DF	James Lepaio	September 6, 1992 (age 34)	9	1	(Tuvalu Islands Football Association) Tofaga
7	FW	Taufaiva Ionatana	February 5, 1993 (age 33)	5	1	(Tuvalu Islands Football Association) Nauti
8	MF	Etimoni Timuani	October 14, 1991 (age 34)	6	0	(Tuvalu Islands Football Association) Lakena United
9	FW	Alopua Petoa	January 24, 1990 (age 36)	10	8	(Tuvalu Islands Football Association) Tofaga
10	MF	Matti Uaelasi	August 14, 1992 (age 34)	4	1	(Tuvalu Islands Football Association) Lakena United
11	FW	Sueni Founuku	June 15, 1994 (age 32)	1	0	(Tuvalu Islands Football Association) Tofaga
12	MF	Okilani Tinilau	January 2, 1989 (age 37)	3	0	(Tuvalu Islands Football Association) Manu Laeva
13	MF	Afelee Valoa	July 5, 1990 (age 36)	5	0	(Tuvalu Islands Football Association) Nauti
14	MF	Suega Tonise	September 27, 1989 (age 36)	0	0	(Tuvalu Islands Football Association) Manu Laeva
15	FW	Sosene Vailine	March 7, 1993 (age 33)	3	0	(Tuvalu Islands Football Association) Nauti
16	FW	Teoliga Fakailoga	September 12, 1997 (age 28)	1	0	(Tuvalu Islands Football Association) Niutao
17	DF	Afelau Kalena	October 23, 1991 (age 34)	0	0	(Tuvalu Islands Football Association) Ha'apai United
18	MF	Tausau Lopati	February 21, 1983 (age 43)	0	0	(Tuvalu Islands Football Association) Manu Laeva
19	MF	Paulo Lotonu	March 20, 1996 (age 30)	5	1	(Tuvalu Islands Football Association) Nauti
22	DF	Vaiuli Nukualofa	February 5, 1994 (age 32)	0	0	(Tuvalu Islands Football Association) Manu Laeva
24	DF	Leiatu Uoli	January 6, 1992 (age 34)	2	0	(Tuvalu Islands Football Association) Manu Laeva
25	MF	Folomanu Kulene	September 4, 1997 (age 29)	2	0	(Tuvalu Islands Football Association) Tofaga
90	GK	Roy Tanapa	October 29, 1990 (age 35)	0	0	(Tuvalu Islands Football Association) Nauti

== Group D ==
=== Kabylia ===
Head Coach: (Kabylie) Lyes Immemai

No.	Pos.	Player	Date of birth (age)	Caps	Goals	Club
1	GK	Murad Koulougli	10 September 1987 (aged 30)	0	0	(French Football Federation) JS Imazighen
2	FW	Abderrezak Chennit	15 January 1998 (age 28)	0	0	(Algerian Football Federation) JS Akbou
3	FW	Enzo Mezaib	5 January 1998 (age 28)	2	0	(French Football Federation) Conflans
4	DF	Idir Belasla	20 November 1999 (age 26)	2	0	(French Football Federation) ASSM Savigneux
5	FW	Karim Ouarab	21 July 1999 (age 27)	0	0	(Algerian Football Federation) JS Kabylie
6	MF	Yanis Kemache	7 June 1995 (age 31)	2	0	(French Football Federation) USM Malakoff
7	MF	Ilyas Hadid	1 January 2000 (age 26)	2	1	(French Football Federation) US Créteil II
8	DF	Khelifa Drider	25 June 1993 (age 33)	2	0	(French Football Federation) Petit Bard Montpellier
9	DF	Elhadi Boukir	9 September 1987 (age 39)	2	0	(Royal Spanish Football Federation) CD Barrio Obrero
10	DF	Ahmed Simoud	16 December 1993 (age 32)	1	0	(French Football Federation) Université Lille 1
11	MF	Amara Hamadache	2 April 1991 (age 35)	2	0	(French Football Federation) Velleneuve St. Georges
12	MF	Idir Lamhene	29 December 1997 (age 28)	0	0	(Algerian Football Federation) US Sidi Belloua
13	MF	Hocine Mohammedi	3 May 1988 (age 38)	0	0	(The Football Association) AC Finchley
14	DF	Yacine Irnatene	1 January 1987 (age 39)	0	0	(The Football Association) Dagenham & Redbridge
15	FW	Sami Boudia	5 January 2000 (age 26)	2	0	(French Football Federation) RCF Paris
16	FW	Bachir Ghuersa	1 October 2000 (age 25)	2	0	(French Football Federation) Velleneuve St. Georges
17	MF	Walid Daira	10 May 1998 (age 28)	0	0	(Algerian Football Federation) ES Tigzirt
18	DF	Idir Bouali	13 December 1987 (age 38)	0	0	(Algerian Football Federation) UM Bejaia
19	DF	Lyes Mihoubi	4 October 1995 (age 30)	0	0	(Algerian Football Federation) ORB Akbou
20	MF	Malik Amerkane	13 February 1988 (age 38)	0	0	(Algerian Football Federation) ES Azzefoun
21	FW	Nafa Belmellat	26 January 1987 (age 39)	0	0	(The Football Association) AC Finchley
22	FW	Nadjim Bouabbas	1 March 1999 (age 27)	2	2	(French Football Federation) US Rungis
24	GK	Rahim Belaid	31 May 1990 (age 36)	0	0	(Canadian Soccer Association) CS Mont-Royal Outremont

=== Panjab ===
Head Coach: (England) Reuben Hazell

No.	Pos.	Player	Date of birth (age)	Caps	Goals	Club
1	GK	Yousuf Butt	18 October 1989 (age 36)	3	0	(Danish Football Association) Greve Fodbold
2	MF	Umar Riaz	25 April 1991 (age 35)	15	2	(The Football Association) Burnham
3	DF	Jhai Singh Dhillon	2 April 1995 (age 31)	11	0	(The Football Association) Chesham United
4	MF	Camen Singh Bhandal	15 April 1994 (age 32)	6	1	(The Football Association) Punjab United
5	DF	Arun Singh Purewal	28 October 1989 (age 36)	11	0	(The Football Association) Consett
6	DF	Jaskaran Singh Basi	21 March 1993 (age 33)	14	0	(The Football Association) Eccleshill United
7	FW	Nathan Minhas	16 September 1997 (age 28)	5	0	(The Football Association) Maidenhead United
8	MF	Aaron Minhas	8 January 1994 (age 32)	12	1	(The Football Association) Beaconsfield Town
9	FW	Amar Singh Purewal	28 October 1989 (age 36)	11	10	(The Football Association) West Auckland Town
10	MF	Rajpal Singh Virk	8 April 1994 (age 32)	10	4	Unattached
11	MF	Amarvir Singh Sandhu	10 December 1995 (age 30)	18	3	(The Football Association) Leicester Road
12	GK	Raajan Singh Gill	15 August 1993 (age 33)	12	0	(The Football Association) Newcastle Town
13	FW	Kamaljat Singh	3 September 1994 (age 32)	3	0	(German Football Association) SpVgg Vreden
14	FW	Gurjit Singh	9 February 1991 (age 35)	11	7	(The Football Association) Rushall Olympic
15	DF	Glen Hayer	2 February 1998 (age 28)	6	0	(The Football Association) Clevedon Town
16	MF	Terlochan Singh	20 October 1989 (age 36)	11	1	(The Football Association) Glebe
17	MF	Taimoor Hussain	21 June 1992 (age 34)	3	0	Unattached
18	DF	Sufyan Zia	10 May 1997 (age 29)	4	0	(The Football Association) Bilston Town
19	FW	Nikinder Uppal	18 April 1995 (age 31)	3	2	(The Football Association) Barnt Green Spartak
20	MF	Arjun Jung	12 April 1994 (age 32)	4	0	(The Football Association) Kings Langley

=== United Koreans in Japan ===
Head Coach: (Korea) An Yong-hak

No.	Pos.	Player	Date of birth (age)	Caps	Goals	Club
1	GK	Lim Hyo-geum	3 May 1996 (age 30)	0	0	(Japan Football Association) Kwansei Gakuin University
2	DF	Shin Yong-ki	14 April 1993 (age 33)	11	0	(Japan Football Association) FC Korea
4	MF	Ko Ji-hwang	2 March 1995 (age 31)	0	0	(Japan Football Association) FC Tokushima
5	DF	Hong Yun-guk	11 February 1995 (age 31)	0	0	(Japan Football Association) FC Tokushima
6	DF	Son Min-chol	27 October 1986 (age 39)	0	0	(Football Association of Hong Kong, China) Lee Man FC
7	MF	Lee Tong-jun	25 June 1993 (age 33)	0	0	(Japan Football Association) Arawore Hachikita
8	MF	Choi Gwang-yeon	23 December 1987 (age 38)	0	0	(Japan Football Association) FC Korea
10	MF	Yun Song-i	29 January 1980 (age 46)	0	0	Unattached
11	FW	Sin Yong-ju	1 January 1996 (age 30)	0	0	(Japan Football Association) FC Korea
13	DF	Kim Sun-ji	5 December 1994 (age 31)	5	0	(Japan Football Association) FC Korea
14	MF	Byun Yeong-jang	1 November 1988 (age 37)	0	0	(Japan Football Association) Tokyo United
17	DF	An Yong-hak	25 October 1978 (age 47)	0	0	Unattached
18	MF	Lee Tong-soung	1 March 1999 (age 27)	0	0	(The Football Association) Staines Town
20	DF	Kang Yoo-jun	8 May 1998 (age 28)	0	0	(United States Soccer Federation) Monroe Mustangs
21	MF	Hong Te-il	24 May 1988 (age 38)	0	0	Unattached
25	GK	Shim Woo-dae	24 January 1985 (age 41)	0	0	Unattached
26	MF	Mun Su-hyeon	6 August 1995 (age 31)	0	0	(Japan Football Association) FC Korea
28	MF	Ken Tamiyama	29 December 1995 (age 30)	10	0	(Japan Football Association) FC Tokushima

=== Western Armenia ===
Head Coach: Harutyun Vardanyan

No.	Pos.	Player	Date of birth (age)	Caps	Goals	Club
1	GK	Gevorg Kasparov	25 July 1980 (age 46)	0	0	(Football Federation of Armenia) FC Gandzasar Kapan
2	DF	Arman Mosoyan	24 April 1990 (age 36)	0	0	Unattached
3	DF	Fabrice Guzel	9 November 1990 (age 35)	5	0	(French Football Federation) US Le Pontet
4	DF	Massis Kaya	15 September 1990 (age 35)	5	0	Unattached
5	DF	Rafael Safaryan	30 January 1986 (age 40)	0	0	(Football Federation of Armenia) FC Ararat
6	MF	Gevorg Najaryan	6 January 1998 (age 28)	0	0	(Kazakhstan Football Federation) Shakhter Karagandy
7	MF	Artur Yedigaryan	26 June 1987 (age 39)	0	0	(Football Federation of Armenia) FC Alashkert
8	MF	David Azin	11 January 1990 (age 36)	2	0	Unattached
9	FW	Vahagn Militosyan	10 June 1993 (age 33)	3	2	(Slovak Football Association) FC Nitra
10	MF	Khoren Veranyan	4 September 1986 (age 40)	0	0	(Football Federation of Armenia) FC Alashkert
11	FW	David Hovsepyan	15 January 1991 (age 35)	3	0	(Slovak Football Association) KFC Komárno
12	GK	Khachatur Hovsepyan	15 January 1991 (age 35)	2	0	(Football Federation of Armenia) FC Ararat
13	DF	Jules Tepelian	31 October 1987 (age 38)	7	0	(French Football Federation) UGA Ardzv
14	DF	Hiraç Yagan	3 January 1989 (age 37)	7	1	(Swiss Football Association) Stade Nyonnais
15	MF	Zaven Varjabetyan	12 November 1998 (age 27)	1	0	(German Football Association) ESC Rellinghausen
16	MF	Norik Hovsepyan	23 December 1998 (age 27)	0	0	(Football Federation of Armenia) Shirak SC
17	DF	Raffi Kaya	8 June 1994 (age 32)	5	1	(Swiss Football Association) Lancy
18	MF	Herant Yagan	1 October 1994 (age 31)	6	0	(Royal Belgian Football Association) FC Suryoye
19	FW	Levon Kürkciyan	2 November 1994 (age 31)	2	0	(German Football Association) 1. FC Kleve
20	MF	Emmanuel Odemis	5 July 2000 (age 26)	2	0	(Swiss Football Association) Stade Nyonnais
21	FW	Vicken Valenza-Berberian	21 September 1992 (age 33)	1	0	(French Football Federation) FC Bords-de-Saône
22	MF	Axel Tashedjian	9 May 2000 (age 26)	1	0	(French Football Federation) Paris FC
23	MF	Georgi Minasov	21 August 1990 (age 36)	0	0	Unattached
