= Tuvalu national football team results =

National football team results

The Tuvalu national football team represents the Pacific island country of Tuvalu in international association football under the auspices of the Tuvalu Islands Football Association. The association was founded in 1979, shortly after the country gained independence. The national football team debuted the same year at the 1979 Pacific Games. Following the tournament, Tuvalu did not play another match for twenty-four years, coming off its hiatus to compete in the 2003 South Pacific Games. The association officially became an associate member of the Oceania Football Confederation on 28 May 2007 at the confederation's congress. The TIFA is not a member of FIFA and, therefore, does not take part in World Cup qualification.

Below is a list of Tuvalu's results in official matches.

== International results ==
Key
Colour	Meaning
	Win
	Draw
	Defeat

Results list Tuvalu's goal tally first.

=== Full international ===
==== Results ====
No.	Date	Venue	Opponent	Score	Competition	Tuvalu scorers	Att.	Ref.
1	30 August 1979	Buckhurst Park, Suva (N)	Tahiti	0–18	1979 South Pacific Games		—	
2	1 September 1979	Ratu Cakobau Park, Nausori (N)	Tonga	5–3	1979 South Pacific Games	Saifoloi (5)	—	
3	3 September 1979	Buckhurst Park, Suva (N)	New Caledonia	0–11	1979 South Pacific Games		—	
4	5 September 1979	Ratu Cakobau Park, Nausori (N)	Kiribati	3–3 (4–2 p)	1979 South Pacific Games	Unknown	—	
5	6 September 1979	Ratu Cakobau Park, Nausori (N)	Guam	2–7	1979 South Pacific Games	Unknown	—	
6	1 May 2003	Fiji (A)	Fiji	0–9	Friendly		—	
7	30 June 2003	National Stadium, Suva (N)	Kiribati	3–2	2003 South Pacific Games	Manoa, Fagota, Semaia	—	
8	1 July 2003	National Stadium, Suva (N)	Fiji	0–4	2003 South Pacific Games		3,000	
9	3 July 2003	National Stadium, Suva (N)	Vanuatu	0–1	2003 South Pacific Games		700	
10	5 July 2003	Ratu Cakobau Park, Nausori (N)	Solomon Islands	0–4	2003 South Pacific Games		2,500	
11	25 August 2007	Toleofoa Joseph Blatter Soccer Complex, Apia (N)	Fiji	0–16	2007 South Pacific Games (Note: The men's football tournament at the 2007 South Pacific Games doubled as qualifiers for the 2008 OFC Nations Cup and the first round of qualifiers for the 2010 FIFA World Cup. However, as Tuvalu were not members of FIFA they were ineligible to qualify for the World Cup.)		200	
12	27 August 2007	Toleofoa Joseph Blatter Soccer Complex, Apia (N)	New Caledonia	0–1	2007 South Pacific Games		250	
13	29 August 2007	Toleofoa Joseph Blatter Soccer Complex, Apia (N)	Tahiti	1–1	2007 South Pacific Games	Sekifu	100	
14	1 September 2007	Toleofoa Joseph Blatter Soccer Complex, Apia (N)	Cook Islands	1–4	2007 South Pacific Games	Willis (o.g.)	200	
15	22 August 2011	Ratu Cakobau Park, Nausori (N)	Samoa	3–0	Friendly	Petoa (3)	—	
16	27 August 2011	Stade Rivière Salée, Nouméa (N)	American Samoa	4–0	2011 Pacific Games	Petoa (3), Tiute	—	
17	30 August 2011	Stade Rivière Salée, Nouméa (N)	Vanuatu	1–5	2011 Pacific Games	Ale	—	
18	1 September 2011	Stade Rivière Salée, Nouméa (N)	New Caledonia	0–8	2011 Pacific Games		—	
19	3 September 2011	Stade Rivière Salée, Nouméa (N)	Solomon Islands	1–6	2011 Pacific Games	Lepaio	—	
20	5 September 2011	Stade Rivière Salée, Nouméa (N)	Guam	1–1	2011 Pacific Games	Stanley	—	
21	2 December 2017	Port Vila Municipal Stadium, Port Vila (N)	Fiji	0–8	2017 Pacific Mini Games		1,000	
22	5 December 2017	Korman Stadium, Port Vila (N)	New Caledonia	2–1	2017 Pacific Mini Games	Ionatana, Petoa	3,000	
23	9 December 2017	Port Vila Municipal Stadium, Port Vila (N)	Solomon Islands	0–6	2017 Pacific Mini Games		1,500	
24	12 December 2017	Port Vila Municipal Stadium, Port Vila (N)	Vanuatu	0–10	2017 Pacific Mini Games		4,000	
25	15 December 2017	Port Vila Municipal Stadium, Port Vila (N)	Tonga	4–3	2017 Pacific Mini Games	Uaelasi, Fahina (o.g.), Petoa, Lotonu	1,000	
26	8 July 2019	National Soccer Stadium, Apia (N)	Solomon Islands	0–13	2019 Pacific Games		300	
27	10 July 2019	National Soccer Stadium, Apia (N)	Tahiti	0–7	2019 Pacific Games		150	
28	12 July 2019	National Soccer Stadium, Apia (N)	American Samoa	1–1	2019 Pacific Games	Petoa	100	
29	15 July 2019	National Soccer Stadium, Apia (N)	Fiji	1–10	2019 Pacific Games	Vailine	250	
30	18 July 2019	National Soccer Stadium, Apia (N)	New Caledonia	0–11	2019 Pacific Games		100	
—	17 November 2023	Lawson Tama Stadium, Honiara (N)	Papua New Guinea	w/o (Note: The Tuvalu football team experience travel delays, so that they were forced to forfeit the game against Papua New Guinea.)	2023 Pacific Games		—	
31	20 November 2023	Lawson Tama Stadium, Honiara (N)	Vanuatu	0–6	2023 Pacific Games			
32	27 November 2023	SIFF Academy Field, Honiara (N)	Tonga	4–0	2023 Pacific Games	Sapele, Pelekata, Vine (2)		
33	30 November 2023	SIFF Academy Field, Honiara (N)	Northern Mariana Islands	4–1	2023 Pacific Games	Pelekata (2), Uaelasi (2)		
33	23 January 2027	Ngahue Reserve, Auckland (N)	Cook Islands		2027 Four Nations Cup			
34	25 January 2027	Ngahue Reserve, Auckland (N)	Kiribati		2027 Four Nations Cup			
35	27 January 2027	Ngahue Reserve, Auckland (N)	Tonga		2027 Four Nations Cup			

==== Head-to-head record ====
Team	Pld	W	D	L	GF	GA	GD	WPCT
American Samoa	2	1	1	0	5	1	+4	50.00
Cook Islands	1	0	0	1	1	4	−3	0.00
Fiji	5	0	0	5	1	47	−46	0.00
Guam	2	0	1	1	3	8	−5	0.00
Kiribati	2	1	1	0	6	5	+1	50.00
New Caledonia	5	1	0	4	2	32	−30	20.00
Northern Mariana Islands	1	1	0	0	4	1	+3	100.00
Samoa	1	1	0	0	3	0	+3	100.00
Solomon Islands	4	0	0	4	1	29	−28	0.00
Tahiti	3	0	1	2	1	26	−25	0.00
Tonga	3	3	0	0	13	6	+7	100.00
Vanuatu	4	0	0	4	1	22	−21	0.00
Total	33	8	4	21	41	181	−140	24.24

Source: Results

=== CONIFA ===
==== Results ====
Tuvalu has previously been a member of CONIFA, an confederation of regions not part of FIFA. The country competed in the 2018 CONIFA World Football Cup after Kiribati withdrew for financial reasons. The team lost its opening match of the tournament 0–4 against Székely Land, a team representing ethnic Hungarians in Romania. After losing all five matches in the competition, Tuvalu defeated the Chagos Islands 6–1 in a post-tournament friendly before returning home.

No.	Date	Venue	Opponent	Score	Competition	Tuvalu scorers	Att.	Ref.
1	31 May 2018	Coles Park, Haringey (N)	Székely Land	0–4	2018 CONIFA World Football Cup		—	
2	2 June 2018	Coles Park, Haringey (N)	Padania	0–8	2018 CONIFA World Football Cup		—	
3	3 June 2018	Coles Park, Haringey (N)	Matabeleland	1–3	2018 CONIFA World Football Cup	Timuani	—	
4	5 June 2018	Larges Lane, Bracknell (N)	United Koreans in Japan	0–5	2018 CONIFA World Football Cup		—	
5	7 June 2018	Gander Green Lane, Sutton (N)	Tamil Eelam	3–4	2018 CONIFA World Football Cup	Petoa (2), Vailine	—	
6	9 June 2018	Bedfont Recreation Ground, Bedfont (N)	Chagos Islands	6–1	Friendly	Tinilau (2), Uaelasi (2), Oride (o.g.), Vailine	—	

==== Head-to-head results ====
Team	Pld	W	D	L	GF	GA	GD	WPCT
Chagos Islands	1	1	0	0	6	1	+5	100.00
Matabeleland	1	0	0	1	1	3	−2	0.00
Padania	1	0	0	1	0	8	−8	0.00
Székely Land	1	0	0	1	0	4	−4	0.00
Tamil Eelam	1	0	0	1	3	4	−1	0.00
United Koreans in Japan	1	0	0	1	0	5	−5	0.00
Total	6	1	0	5	10	25	−15	16.67

Source: Results

== All-time goalscorers ==
=== Full international ===
As of match played 30 November 2023

Rank	Name	Goals
1	Alopua Petoa	9
2	Saifoloi Metia Tealofi	5
3	Matti Uaelesi	3
3	Andrew Pelekata	3
5	Keni Vine	2
6	Kivoli Manoa	1
6	Paenui Fagota	1
6	Petio Semaia	1
6	Vilamu Sekifu	1
6	Lutelu Tiute	1
6	Uota Ale	1
6	James Lepaio	1
6	Togavai Stanley	1
6	Taufaiva Ionatana	1
6	Paulo Lotonu	1
6	Sosene Vailine	1
6	Yvan Sapele	1

- Source: Results

=== CONIFA ===
As of match played 9 June 2018

Rank	Name	Goals
1	Alopua Petoa	2
1	Sosene Vailine	2
1	Okilani Tinilau	2
1	Matti Uaelesi	2
5	Etimoni Timuani	1

- Source: Results
