= List of Kiribati international footballers =

The Kiribati national football team represents the country of Kiribati in international association football. It is fielded by the Kiribati Islands Football Federation, the governing body of football in Kiribati, and competes as an associate member of the Oceania Football Confederation (OFC), which encompasses the countries of Oceania. Kiribati played their first international match on 30 August 1979 in a 24–0 loss to Fiji in Suva during the 1979 South Pacific Games.

Kiribati have only competed in Pacific Games, and all players who have played in at least one match, either as a member of the starting eleven or as a substitute, are listed below. Each player's details include his playing position while with the team, the number of caps earned and goals scored in all international matches, and details of the first and most recent matches played in. The names are initially ordered by number of caps (in descending order), then by date of debut, then by alphabetical order. All statistics are correct up to and including the match played on 5 September 2011.

== Key ==
Positions key
GK	Goalkeeper
DF	Defender
MF	Midfielder
FW	Forward

Position
Playing positions are listed according to the tactical formations that were employed at the time.
Caps and goals
Caps and goals comprise those in the Pacific Games.

== Players ==
Kiribati national team players
Player	Pos.	Caps	Goals	Debut		Last or most recent match		Ref.
Player	Pos.	Caps	Goals	Date	Opponent	Date	Opponent	Ref.
Nabaruru Batiri	DF	8	0	30 June 2003	Tuvalu	5 September 2011	Tahiti	
Tarariki Tarotu	GK	6	0	30 June 2003	Tuvalu	5 September 2011	Tahiti	
Tebwaia Baikawa	DF	4	0	30 June 2003	Tuvalu	7 July 2003	Vanuatu	
Naingimea Beiaruru	FW	4	0	30 June 2003	Tuvalu	7 July 2003	Vanuatu	
Ruevita Iotin	MF	4	0	30 June 2003	Tuvalu	7 July 2003	Vanuatu	
Nabuaka Itimaroroa	MF	4	0	30 June 2003	Tuvalu	7 July 2003	Vanuatu	
Tokabi Kaiorake	DF	4	0	30 June 2003	Tuvalu	7 July 2003	Vanuatu	
Ukenio Kobuti	DF	4	0	30 June 2003	Tuvalu	7 July 2003	Vanuatu	
Atanuea Eritara	MF	4	0	30 August 2011	Fiji	5 September 2011	Tahiti	
Kaben Ioteba	DF	4	0	30 August 2011	Fiji	5 September 2011	Tahiti	
Biitamatang Keakea	MF	4	0	30 August 2011	Fiji	5 September 2011	Tahiti	
Martin Miriata	MF	4	0	30 August 2011	Fiji	5 September 2011	Tahiti	
Antin Nanotaake	FW	4	0	30 August 2011	Fiji	5 September 2011	Tahiti	
Enri Tenukai	DF	4	0	30 August 2011	Fiji	5 September 2011	Tahiti	
David Collins	MF	3	0	30 June 2003	Tuvalu	5 July 2003	Fiji	
Betaia Ioana	MF	3	0	30 June 2003	Tuvalu	7 July 2003	Vanuatu	
Palamo Kulene	FW	3	0	30 June 2003	Tuvalu	7 July 2003	Vanuatu	
Lawrence Nemeia	MF	3	2	30 June 2003	Tuvalu	7 July 2003	Vanuatu	
Atantaake Tooma	FW	3	0	30 June 2003	Tuvalu	7 July 2003	Vanuatu	
Erene Bwakineti	FW	3	1	30 August 2011	Fiji	5 September 2011	Tahiti	
Jeff Jong	MF	3	0	30 August 2011	Fiji	3 September 2011	Papua New Guinea	
Kaake Kamta	DF	3	0	30 August 2011	Fiji	5 September 2011	Tahiti	
Joseph Yan	FW	3	0	30 August 2011	Fiji	3 September 2011	Papua New Guinea	
Karotu Bakaane	FW	3	0	1 September 2011	Cook Islands	5 September 2011	Tahiti	
Tiaon Miika	GK	3	0	30 August 2011	Fiji	5 September 2011	Tahiti	
Kiteone Kairoronga	GK	2	0	3 July 2003	Solomon Islands	5 July 2003	Fiji	
Benjamina Kaintikuaba	DF	2	0	30 August 2011	Fiji	5 September 2011	Tahiti	
Tongarua Akori	MF	2	0	3 September 2011	Papua New Guinea	5 September 2011	Tahiti	
Eritara Riteti	FW	1	0	7 July 2003	Solomon Islands	7 July 2003	Solomon Islands	
Takinoa Tekaie	DF	1	0	7 July 2003	Solomon Islands	7 July 2003	Solomon Islands	
Teburae Rataro	MF	1	0	7 July 2003	Vanuatu	7 July 2003	Vanuatu	
Tiaon Rekenibai		1	0	7 July 2003	Vanuatu	7 July 2003	Vanuatu	
Bauru Kaiorake	MF	1	0	30 August 2011	Fiji	30 August 2011	Fiji	
Atino Baraniko	MF	1	0	1 September 2011	Cook Islands	1 September 2011	Cook Islands	
