= Tim Jerks =

Australian football coach

Personal information
- Place of birth: Australia

Managerial career
- Years: Team
- 2003: Tuvalu
- 2004–2010: Cook Islands

Tim Jerks is an Australian football coach.

Jerks was active as coaching development manager at the New South Wales Institute of Sport, before he was appointed in May 2003 as the coach of the Tuvalu national football team. The 3–2 win against Kiribati in the 2003 South Pacific Games was celebrated as a major achievement for Tuvaluan football as Kiribati is recognised as one of the leading teams in the competition.

In the years 2004/05 and 2007/08, Jerks was the chief coach of the Cook Islands national football team for the FIFA World Cup-qualification. In the 2007 South Pacific Games Cook Islands defeated Tuvalu 4–1.

In 2010, he was a coach of the Cook Islands, before being replaced from the New Zealander Shane Rufer.
