= Ersid =

Ersid is a given name. People with the given name include:

- Ersid Ljuca, Kosovo Albanian basketball player
- Ersid Pllumbaj (born 1989), Albanian footballer
