= List of Tuvalu international footballers =

The Tuvalu national football team represents the country of Tuvalu in international association football. It is fielded by the Tuvalu National Football Association, the governing body of football in Tuvalu, and competes as an associate member of the Oceania Football Confederation (OFC), which encompasses the countries of Oceania. Tuvalu played their first international match on 30 August 1979 in a 18–0 loss to Tahiti in Suva.

Tuvalu have competed in the Pacific Games and Pacific Mini Games, and all players who have played in at least one match, either as a member of the starting eleven or as a substitute, are listed below. Each player's details include his playing position while with the team, the number of caps earned and goals scored in all international matches, and details of the first and most recent matches played in. The names are initially ordered by number of caps (in descending order), then by date of debut, then by alphabetical order. All statistics are correct up to and including the match played on 18 July 2019.

== Key ==
Positions key
GK	Goalkeeper
DF	Defender
MF	Midfielder
FW	Forward

Position
Playing positions are listed according to the tactical formations that were employed at the time.
Caps and goals
Caps and goals comprise those in the Pacific Games.

== Players ==
Tuvalu national team players
Player	Pos.	Caps	Goals	Debut		Last or most recent match		Ref.
Player	Pos.	Caps	Goals	Date	Opponent	Date	Opponent	Ref.
Alopua Petoa	FW	13	9	22 August 2011	Samoa	18 July 2019	New Caledonia	
Katepu Sieni	GK	13	0	1 September 2011	New Caledonia	18 July 2019	New Caledonia	
Mau Penisula	DF	12	0	30 June 2003	Kiribati	5 September 2011	Guam	
Jelly Selau	MF	10	1	25 August 2007	Fiji	14 December 2017	Tonga	
Paulo Lotonu	MF	10	1	2 December 2017	Fiji	18 July 2019	New Caledonia	
Taufaiva Ionatana	FW	9	1	2 December 2017	Fiji	18 July 2019	New Caledonia	
Afelee Valoa	MF	9	0	2 December 2017	Fiji	18 July 2019	New Caledonia	
James Lepaio	MF	8	1	27 August 2011	American Samoa	14 December 2017	Tonga	
Sosene Vailine	FW	8	1	2 December 2017	Fiji	18 July 2019	New Caledonia	
Paenui Fagota	FW	7	1	30 June 2003	Kiribati	29 August 2007	Tahiti	
Joshua Tui Tapasei	DF	7	0	30 June 2003	Kiribati	5 September 2011	Guam	
Paolo Taitai	DF	7	0	2 December 2017	Fiji	18 July 2019	New Caledonia	
Meauke Tuilagi	DF	7	0	2 December 2017	Fiji	15 July 2019	Fiji	
Peniuna Kaitu	FW	6	0	30 June 2003	Kiribati	1 September 2007	Cook Islands	
Petio Semaia	MF	6	1	30 June 2003	Kiribati	1 September 2007	Cook Islands	
Jay Timo	GK	6	0	30 June 2003	Kiribati	1 September 2007	Cook Islands	
Lalesi Vaia	DF	6	0	30 June 2003	Kiribati	1 September 2007	Cook Islands	
Kalamelu Seloto	DF	6	0	2 December 2017	Fiji	15 July 2019	Fiji	
Silimai Siaosi	DF	6	0	5 December 2017	New Caledonia	8 July 2019	New Caledonia	
Semese Alefaio	DF	5	0	30 June 2003	Kiribati	1 September 2007	Cook Islands	
Vaisua Liva	MF	5	0	27 August 2011	American Samoa	5 September 2011	Guam	
Alinesi Takataka	DF	5	0	27 August 2011	American Samoa	5 September 2011	Guam	
Etimoni Timuani	DF	5	0	27 August 2011	American Samoa	5 September 2011	Guam	
Akelei Lima'alofa	MF	5	0	3 September 2011	Solomon Islands	14 December 2017	Tonga	
Maalosi Alefaio	DF	5	0	8 July 2019	Solomon Islands	18 July 2019	New Caledonia	
Sepetaio Nokisi	DF	5	0	8 July 2019	Solomon Islands	18 July 2019	New Caledonia	
Titaga Bali	FW	4	0	30 June 2003	Kiribati	5 July 2003	Solomon Islands	
Moeava Mausalii	MF	4	0	30 June 2003	Kiribati	5 July 2003	Solomon Islands	
Mosese Huehue	MF	4	0	30 June 2003	Kiribati	5 July 2003	Solomon Islands	
Kivola Manoa	MF	4	1	30 June 2003	Kiribati	5 July 2003	Solomon Islands	
Molu Tavita	DF	4	0	30 June 2003	Kiribati	5 July 2003	Solomon Islands	
Imo Fiamalua	MF	4	0	25 August 2007	Fiji	1 September 2007	Cook Islands	
Mati Fusi	FW	4	0	25 August 2007	Fiji	1 September 2007	Cook Islands	
Papua Ulisese	MF	4	0	25 August 2007	Fiji	1 September 2007	Cook Islands	
George Panapa	DF	4	0	27 August 2011	American Samoa	5 September 2011	Guam	
Lutelu Tiute	FW	4	1	27 August 2011	American Samoa	5 September 2011	Guam	
Alamoana Tofuola	DF	4	0	27 August 2011	American Samoa	3 September 2011	Solomon Islands	
Matti Uaelasi	MF	4	1	2 December 2017	Fiji	14 December 2017	Tonga	
Sueni Founuku	DF	4	0	12 December 2017	Vanuatu	18 July 2019	New Caledonia	
Nelesone Musika	MF	4	0	8 July 2019	Solomon Islands	18 July 2019	New Caledonia	
Kasipa Fagota	MF	3	0	30 June 2003	Kiribati	5 July 2003	Solomon Islands	
Samasoni Mapasaga	DF	3	0	1 July 2003	Fiji	5 July 2003	Solomon Islands	
Polu Tanei	FW	3	0	3 July 2003	Vanuatu	5 July 2003	Solomon Islands	
Viliamu Sekifu	FW	3	1	27 August 2007	New Caledonia	1 September 2007	Cook Islands	
Fulisagafou Hauma	DF	3	0	27 August 2007	New Caledonia	1 September 2007	Cook Islands	
Paitela Kelemene	MF	3	0	27 August 2007	New Caledonia	1 September 2007	Cook Islands	
Okilani Tinilau	MF	3	0	30 August 2007	Vanuatu	1 September 2007	Solomon Islands	
Togavai Stanley	MF	3	1	1 September 2011	New Caledonia	5 September 2011	Guam	
Laupama Elu	DF	3	0	2 December 2017	Fiji	12 December 2017	Vanuatu	
Tinoga Temate	MF	3	0	8 July 2019	Solomon Islands	18 July 2019	New Caledonia	
Fata Filemoni	MF	3	0	10 July 2019	Tahiti	15 July 2019	Fiji	
Nokisi Kaito	DF	3	0	12 July 2019	American Samoa	18 July 2019	New Caledonia	
Haueia Vaaia	GK	2	0	1 July 2003	Fiji	3 July 2003	Vanuatu	
Hetoa Kaio	MF	2	0	25 August 2007	Fiji	27 August 2007	New Caledonia	
Loisio Peni	MF	2	0	25 August 2007	Fiji	27 August 2007	New Caledonia	
Uota Ale	MF	2	1	27 August 2011	American Samoa	30 August 2011	Vanuatu	
Lopati Okelani	FW	2	0	27 August 2011	American Samoa	30 August 2011	Vanuatu	
Kolone Pokia	DF	2	0	27 August 2011	American Samoa	30 August 2011	Vanuatu	
Raj Sogivalu	MF	2	0	1 September 2011	New Caledonia	3 September 2011	Solomon Islands	
Folomanu Kulene	MF	2	0	12 December 2017	Vanuatu	14 December 2017	Tonga	
Leiatu Uoli	DF	2	0	12 December 2017	Vanuatu	14 December 2017	Tonga	
Afelau Kalena	FW	2	0	8 July 2019	Solomon Islands	12 July 2019	American Samoa	
Hosea Sente	FW	2	0	10 July 2019	Tahiti	15 July 2019	Fiji	
Waintau Taaroa	DF	2	0	12 July 2019	American Samoa	15 July 2019	Fiji	
Mahafe Nakala	MF	1	0	30 June 2003	Kiribati	30 June 2003	Kiribati	
Melei Melei	MF	1	0	1 July 2003	Fiji	1 July 2003	Fiji	
Sumeo Silu	FW	1	0	1 July 2003	Fiji	1 July 2003	Fiji	
Iupeli Kamoni	FW	1	0	3 July 2003	Vanuatu	3 July 2003	Vanuatu	
Meauma Petaia	MF	1	0	3 September 2003	Solomon Islands	3 September 2003	Solomon Islands	
Tapeni Letueti	FW	1	0	1 September 2007	Cook Islands	1 September 2007	Cook Islands	
Teoliga Fakailoga	FW	1	0	9 December 2017	Solomon Islands	9 December 2017	Solomon Islands	
Taulau Iotonu	DF	1	0	9 December 2017	Solomon Islands	9 December 2017	Solomon Islands	
Toua Tueni	MF	1	0	9 December 2017	Solomon Islands	9 December 2017	Solomon Islands	
Tafea Ioka	MF	1	0	12 December 2017	Vanuatu	12 December 2017	Vanuatu	
Itaia Ioane	GK	1	0	14 December 2017	Tonga	14 December 2017	Tonga	
Sakaio Faimalaga	DF	1	0	12 July 2019	American Samoa	12 July 2019	American Samoa	
