= 2027 Four Nations Cup =

Tournament details
- Host country: New Zealand
- City: Auckland
- Dates: 23-30 January 2027
- Teams: 4 (from 1 confederation)
- Venue: 1 (in 1 host city)

The 2027 Four Nations Cup is a planned association football friendly tournament to be held in January 2027. Tuvalu will host the competition in Auckland, New Zealand.

== History ==
In October 2026, it was announced that the Tuvalu Islands Football Association and Kiribati Islands Football Associations, both associate members of the Oceania Football Confederation, could become full members of the regional confederation pending a vote at its congress in March 2027. Ahead of the congress, Tuvalu announced that it would host Kiribati, the Cook Islands, and Tonga for a friendly tournament in Auckland, home of the OFC's headquarters, two months before the scheduled vote. Two additiional nations were invited but had not yet responded. The event would mark the first time Kiribati and Tuvalu will play full international matches since the 2011 Pacific Games and 2023 Pacific Games respectively.

Later that month, Dutch manager Robert Maaskant who previously coached NAC Breda, Go Ahead Eagles, and Willem II was announced as Tuvalu's new national manager. Signing a one-year contract, Maaskant's first matches in charge of the team would be at the Four Nations Cup. Thijs Matla, one of Maaskant's assistants, would travel to Tuvalu to prepare the team with the rest of the coaching staff joining up in New Zealand ahead of the tournament.

== Participating nations ==
- Cook Islands
- Kiribati
- Tonga
- Tuvalu
- NZ Māori (possible)

== Venues ==
Auckland
Ngahue Reserve
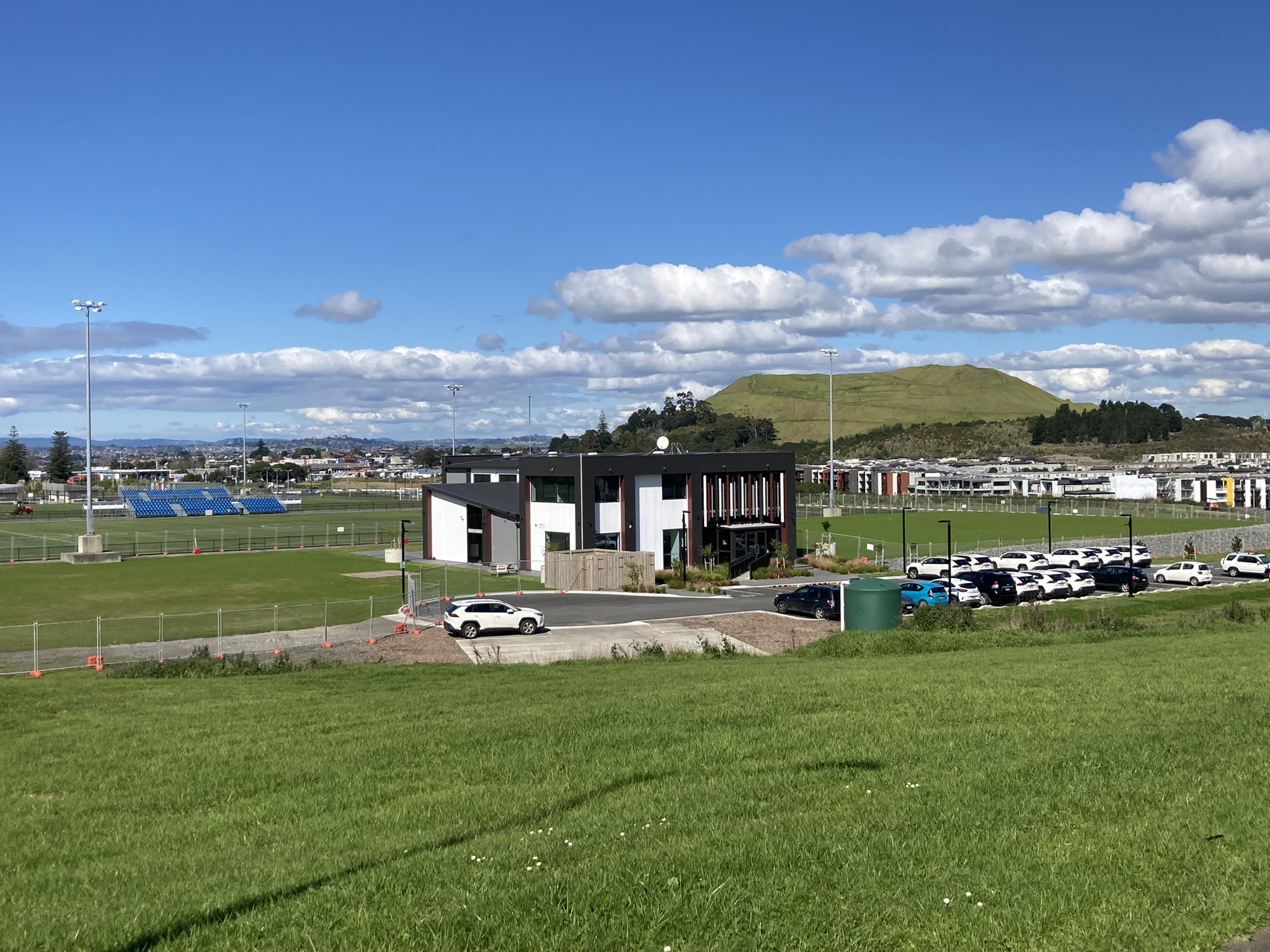

== Table ==
Pos	Team	Pld	W	D	L	GF	GA	GD	Pts
1	Cook Islands	0	0	0	0	0	0	0	0
2	Kiribati	0	0	0	0	0	0	0	0
3	Tonga	0	0	0	0	0	0	0	0
4	Tuvalu	0	0	0	0	0	0	0	0
