= Jason Alama =

Tuvaluan association footballer

Personal information
- Full name: Jason Neemia Silotasi Alama
- Date of birth: 31 October 2002 (age 24)
- Place of birth: Auckland, New Zealand
- Height: 1.76 m (5 ft 9 in)
- Position: Defender

Team information
- Current team: Western Springs
- Number: 3

Youth career
- –2018: Waitakere City
- 2019–2020: Waitakere United

Senior career*
| Years | Team | Apps | (Gls) |
| 2018–2021 | Waitakere City | 12 | (0) |
| 2021–2025 | West Coast Rangers | 43 | (0) |
| 2026– | Western Springs | 13 | (1) |

International career^{‡}
| 2023– | Tuvalu | 3 | (0) |
| 2025– | Tuvalu (futsal) | 4 | (0) |
- * Club domestic league appearances and goals as of 21:10, 21 October 2026 (UTC) ‡ National team caps and goals as of 21:10, 21 October 2026 (UTC)

Jason Neemia Silotasi Alama (born 31 October 2002) is a Tuvaluan footballer who currently plays for National League club Western Springs, and the Tuvalu national team. In 2026, Dutch newspaper De Limburger referred to Alama as, "the best player from the world's most remote country”.

== Club career ==
Alama began playing football at age five with West Auckland club Ranui Swanson. He would later captain the youth side of Waitakere United in the New Zealand National Youth League. The defender eventually joined Waitakere City, the club for which he would make his senior debut in the Northern League at age 16. In 2021, Alama joined West Coast Rangers. He was named the club's Men's Young Player of the Year in 2022. He re-signed for the club ahead of the 2025 season.

In 2026, Alama moved to Western Springs, also of the Northern League. That season, the club earned promotion to the New Zealand National League for the 2027 season. In October 2026, Michiel van der Werf, Technical Director of the Tuvalu Islands Football Association, announced that Alama would go on a two-week internship at VVV-Venlo of the Dutch Eerste Divisie. The trial offered the player the opportunity to become Tuvalu's first player to sign a professional contract anywhere in the world.

== International career ==
Born in New Zealand, Alama is eligible to represent Tuvalu through his parents who are from the country. He made his senior international debut for Tuvalu on 20 November 2023 in a 2023 Pacific Games match against Vanuatu. He would go on to earn three caps for the country in the competition. In 2025, he was part of Tuvalu's national futsal team for the 2025 OFC Futsal Men's Cup, marking the nation's return to the tournament after fourteen years.

=== International statistics ===
As of match played 22 June 2024

Tuvalu
| Year | Apps | Goals |
|---|---|---|
| 2023 | 3 | 0 |
| Total | 3 | 0 |
