= Lupane State University =

University in Zimbabwe

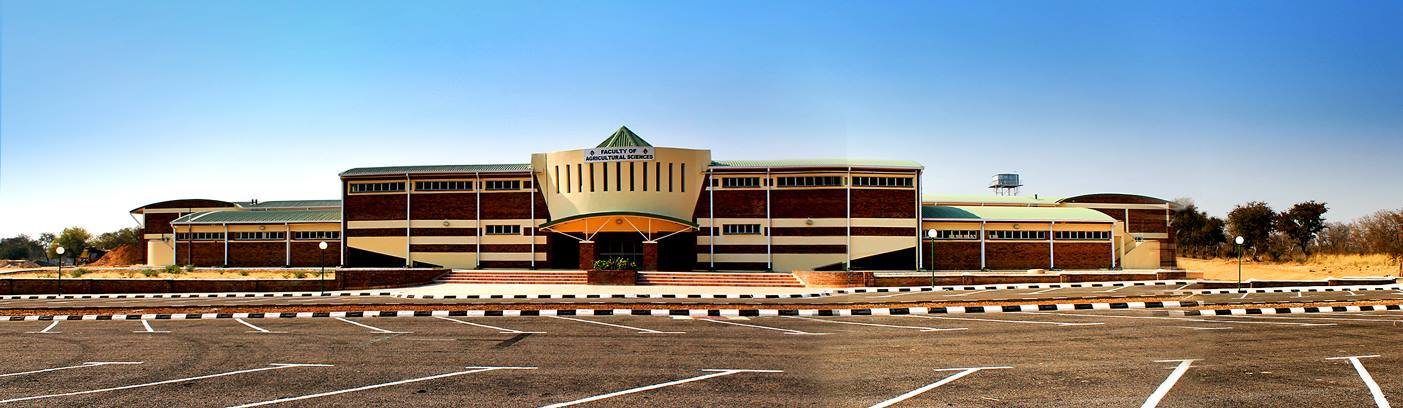
- Type: Public
- Established: 2005
- Students: 4874 (as of 2020)
- Location: Lupane, Zimbabwe
- Website: http://www.lsu.ac.zw/

Lupane State University (LSU) was established in 2005 in Lupane, Zimbabwe.

Its aim is to promote agriculture in the country's semi-arid regions through education. After initially enrolling 12 agriculture students, it has expanded to nearly 5,000 students across its Faculty of Agricultural Sciences, Faculty of Engineering and Applied Sciences, Faculty of Commerce, and Faculty of Humanities and Social Sciences.
