= Kevin McGreskin =

Scottish football coach

Personal information
- Full name: Kevin Peter Mcgreskin
- Date of birth: 14 January 1978 (age 48)
- Place of birth: Dundee, Scotland
- Height: 1.70 m (5 ft 7 in)

Managerial career
- Years: Team
- 2011–2013: Partick Thistle F.C. (Assistant)
- 2013–2014: Dundee United F.C. (Assistant)
- 2015–2016: Bahamas Football Association (National Technical Director)
- 2019-2020: Cook Islands Football Association (National Technical Director)
- 2020: Forfar Farmington (Assistant)
- 2021: Forfar Farmington
- 2021: América Reserves and Academy (women)

Kevin McGreskin is a Scottish professional football coach who is currently head coach of Forfar Farmington in the Scottish Women's Premier League.

== Career ==
From July 2011 until January 2013, he was an assistant coach of Partick Thistle F.C. working with Manager Jackie McNamara and Assistant Manager Simon Donnelly. Under McNamara, Thistle played an exciting attacking style of football and went on to win the Scottish Championship in 2013 .

From February 2013 to May 2014 he worked with Dundee United F.C. after Jackie McNamara was appointed Manager. McNamara implemented a similar style of free-flowing attacking football, which had been successful at Thistle, and led Dundee United to successive top 6 finishes in the Scottish Premiership and were Scottish Cup Finalists in 2014.

From February 2015 until February 2016 he worked as the National Technical Director of the Bahamas Football Association where he also coached the men's and women's national teams at both senior and youth level.

He has also worked as a consultant for a number of clubs in Europe, including Dinamo Zagreb, SC Heerenveen, and Molde FK.

He is also involved in coach education and has delivered on the UEFA Pro/A/B Licence courses and has worked with a number of National Associations, including the Croatian Football Federation, Danish Football Union, Irish FA and Welsh FA.

In 2019 McGreskin was appointed Technical Director of the Cook Islands Football Association, with responsibilities for developing the National Academy and coach education.

Having previously been assistant to Ryan McConville, McGreskin was appointed as head coach of Scottish Women's Premier League club Forfar Farmington until the end of the 2020-21 season when McConville left the club in January 2021. His first match in charge was a 3–2 win against Motherwell.

In June 2021, it was announced that McGreskin had departed Forfar Farmington to "take on a new venture in Mexico".
