= Joseph Yan =

I-Kiribati footballer (born 1993)

Personal information
- Full name: Joseph Yan
- Date of birth: 25 January 1993 (age 33)
- Place of birth: Tarawa, Kiribati
- Position: Forward

Team information
- Current team: Levin Colts

Senior career*
| Years | Team | Apps | (Gls) |
| 2009–2010 | Tarawa Urban Council | | |
| 2010–2011 | Tafea | | |
| 2011 | Tarawa Urban Council | | |
| 2022–2024 | Levin Social | 26 | (7) |
| 2025– | Levin Colts | 4 | (0) |

International career^{‡}
| 2011 | Kiribati | 3 | (0) |
- * Club domestic league appearances and goals ‡ National team caps and goals as of 2 September 2026

Joseph Yan (born 25 January 1993) is a I-Kiribati footballer who plays as a forward for Levin Colts, a reserve team of Levin AFC.

He is regarded as the one of the greatest I-Kiribati footballers of all time, and is also the only ever I-Kiribati footballer to play at semi-professional level.

== Club career ==
Yan started his club career for his local club, playing in the Kiribati National Championship with Tarawa Urban Council, with whom he would win the 2009 Kiribati Insurance Corporation Tournament over Young Frigate. He would later gain a move to Ni-Vanuatu giants Tafea, where he would spend a year before returning to Kiribati to play for Tarawa UC again. He was later included in multiple Levin AFC squads, including their masters, social and colts teams. He played well in the Social team, notably scoring a hattrick against Groombridge Electrical Feilding Utd C, leading to him being promoted to the Colts team the next season, whom he played for in the 2025 Manawatu Division 2 season, the 7th tier of New Zealand football.

== International career ==
He represented Kiribati in the 2011 Pacific Games, where he would play 3 games. He received a yellow card in his the match against the Cook Islands, and would injure himself shooting against Papua New Guinea, ruling him out for the tournament and leaving him as an unused substitute against Tahiti.

== Career statistics ==
=== International ===
As of match played 2 September 2026

Appearances and goals by national team and year
| National team | Year | Apps | Goals |
|---|---|---|---|
| Kiribati | 2011 | 3 | 0 |
| Total | | 3 | 0 |
