= Roberto Rudi =

Italian footballer

Personal information
- Date of birth: 13 April 1987 (age 39)
- Place of birth: Tradate, Italy
- Height: 1.81 m (5 ft 11 in)
- Position: Defender

Senior career*
Years	Team	Apps	(Gls)
2005–2011	Como	85	(0)
2011–2012	Aurora Pro Patria	7	(0)
2012–2014	Calcio Lecco	30	(0)
2014–2017	Caronnese	63	(1)
2017	Folgore Caratese	0	(0)
2017–2018	Varese	23	(0)
2018	Borgosesia	8	(0)
2019	Pavia	10	(0)
2019–2020	USD Castellanzese	19	(0)

International career
	Padania	8	(0)
- * Club domestic league appearances and goals as of 30 december 2022 (UTC)

Roberto Rudi (born 13 April 1987) is an Italian footballer that plays as a defender.

== Career statistics ==
As of 2 July 2018.

Club	Season	League			Cup		Continental		Other		Total	
Club	Season	Division	Apps	Goals	Apps	Goals	Apps	Goals	Apps	Goals	Apps	Goals
Como	2009–10	Lega Pro Prima Divisione	10	0	1 (Note: Appearances in the Coppa Italia)	0	–		0	0	11	0
Como	2010–11	Lega Pro Prima Divisione	–		1	0	–		0	0	1	0
Aurora Pro Patria	2011–12	Lega Pro Seconda Divisione	6	0	0	0	–		0	0	6	0
Caronnese	2014–15	Serie D - A	23	0	0	0	–		0	0	23	0
Caronnese	2015–16	Serie D - A	30	1	0	0	–		2 (Note: Appearances in the Serie D Play-off)	0	32	1
Caronnese	2016–17	Serie D - A	10	0	0	0	–		0	0	10	0
Caronnese	Total		63	1	0	0	0	0	2	0	65	1
Varese Calcio	2017–18	Serie D - A	23	0	0	0	–		1 (Note: Appearances in the Serie D Play-out)	0	24	0
Career total			104	1	2	0	0	0	1	0	107	1
