= Robert Maaskant =

Dutch footballer and manager (born 1969)

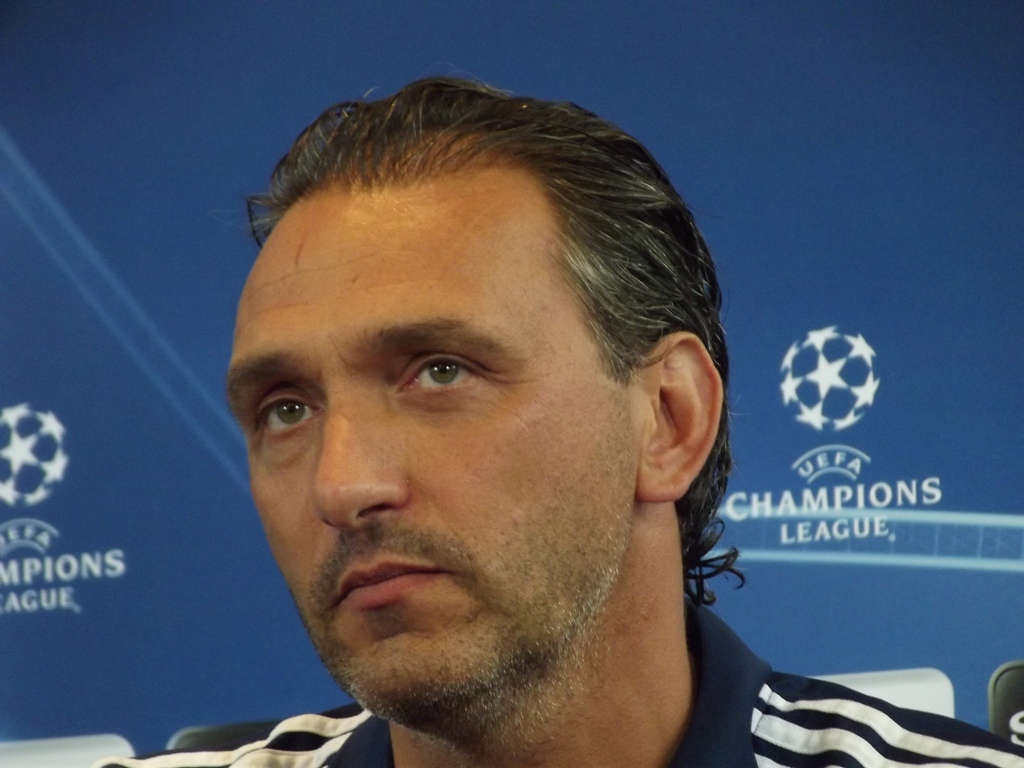
- Maaskant as Wisła Kraków manager in 2011

Personal information
- Full name: Robert Patrick Maaskant
- Date of birth: 10 January 1969 (age 57)
- Place of birth: Schiedam, Netherlands
- Height: 1.94 m (6 ft 4 in)
- Position: Midfielder

Team information
- Current team: Tuvalu (head coach)

Senior career*
Years	Team	Apps	(Gls)
1989–1990	Go Ahead Eagles	21	(1)
1990–1991	Emmen	12	(0)
1991–1992	Motherwell	12	(0)
1992–1995	Zwolle	75	(3)
1995–1996	Excelsior	12	(1)
Total		132	(5)

Managerial career
- 1999–2002: RBC Roosendaal
- 2002–2003: Go Ahead Eagles
- 2003–2004: RBC Roosendaal
- 2004–2005: Willem II
- 2006–2007: RBC Roosendaal
- 2007–2008: MVV Maastricht
- 2008–2010: NAC Breda
- 2010–2011: Wisła Kraków
- 2012: Texas Dutch Lions
- 2012–2013: Groningen
- 2013: Dinamo Minsk
- 2015: NAC Breda
- 2017: Go Ahead Eagles
- 2019: VVV-Venlo
- 2025: Helmond Sport
- 2026–: Tuvalu
- * Club domestic league appearances and goals

Robert Patrick Maaskant (Dutch pronunciation: [ˈrɔbərt ˈpɛtrɪk ˈmaːskɑnt]; born 10 January 1969) is a Dutch professional football manager and former player who is currently the head coach of the Tuvalu national team.

== Club career ==
Maaskant played for Go Ahead Eagles, Emmen, Motherwell, Zwolle and Excelsior.

== Managerial career ==
A former assistant coach at Go Ahead Eagles and Zwolle, Maaskant was appointed head coach of RBC Roosendaal for the 1999–2000 season. He remained in charge for three years before joining Go Ahead Eagles. After a seven-month stint in Deventer, he returned to RBC Roosendaal before moving to Willem II in the summer of 2004. He was dismissed on 21 November 2005 and replaced by Kees Zwamborn.

On 4 January 2006, Maaskant returned to RBC Roosendaal as head coach, succeeding Dolf Roks. He was dismissed in 2007 and subsequently signed a one-year contract with MVV Maastricht for the 2007–08 season, with an option to extend for two additional years. In February 2008, he left MVV to join NAC Breda as an assistant to Ernie Brandts. Following Brandts' departure later that year, Maaskant was appointed head coach.

Maaskant had two relatively successful seasons at NAC Breda. In his first season, the club qualified for the UEFA Cup. In his second season, NAC narrowly missed out on the play-offs for a UEFA Cup spot. From May 2010 onward, financial difficulties at the club became apparent. Shortly after, Maaskant voiced his concerns publicly, but budget constraints prevented him from signing new players.

On 21 August 2010, NAC and Maaskant made public that he would leave NAC Breda for Polish football club Wisła Kraków, signing a two-year deal. Maaskant won the Polish championship in his first season at Wisła Kraków. However, he missed the qualification to the 2011–12 UEFA Champions League group stage. On 7 November 2011, a day after Wisła's first away loss against city rival Cracovia since 28 years, Wisła Kraków announced that they had parted ways with Maaskant.

On 1 May 2012, Maaskant joined Texas Dutch Lions as an advisor and head coach.

On 23 May 2012, Maaskant signed as head coach for Groningen. This was possible because of a clause in his Dutch Lions contract, that allowed him to leave early.

Groningen announced on 11 March 2013 that it would not be renewing its one-year contract with Maaskant.

In June 2013, Maaskant signed a one-and-a-half-year contract with Belarusian side Dinamo Minsk.

In January 2014, Maaskant signed a one-year contract with the Columbus Crew in the Major League Soccer to be their assistant coach.

On 2 January 2015, it was announced that Maaskant had returned as head coach of Eredivisie side NAC Breda.

On 25 March 2017, Maaskant was appointed manager of Go Ahead Eagles for the remainder of the 2016–17 season.

Maaskant was appointed director of football at Almere City on 24 March 2018. He left the position at the end of the 2018–19 season to become manager of VVV-Venlo, but got laid of due to bad results on 11 November 2019.

On 11 February 2025, Maaskant was appointed head coach of Helmond Sport, marking his return to management after a hiatus of more than five years. Helmond finished 13th in the 2024–25 Eerste Divisie, and Maaskant left the club after his contract expired at the end of the season.

On 23 October 2026, it was announced that Maaskant would become the new head coach of the Tuvalu national team.

== Honours ==
=== Manager ===
Wisła Kraków

- Ekstraklasa: 2010–11

== Electoral history ==
Electoral history of Robert Maaskant
Year	Body	Party	Pos.	Votes	Result		Ref.
Year	Body	Party	Pos.	Votes	Party seats	Individual	Ref.
2023	House of Representatives	Party for Sports	10 (Note: Maaskant participated as lijstduwer.)	446	0	Lost	
