= Katepu Iosua =

Tuvaluan footballer (born 1988)

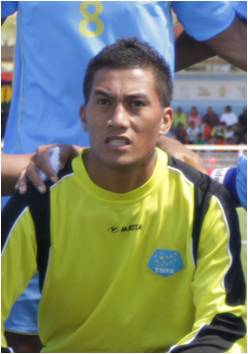

Personal information
- Full name: Katepu Iosua Sieni
- Date of birth: 11 May 1988 (age 38)
- Place of birth: Vaitupu, Tuvalu
- Height: 1.80 m (5 ft 11 in)
- Position: Goalkeeper

Senior career*
Years	Team	Apps	(Gls)
2009–2024	Tofaga		

International career
2011–2023	Tuvalu	15	(0)
2025	Tuvalu futsal	4	(0)
- * Club domestic league appearances and goals

Katepu Iosua Sieni (born 11 May 1988) is a Tuvaluan footballer who plays as a goalkeeper.

== Career ==
Between 2011 and 2023, Iosua made 15 appearances for the Tuvalu national team, making him the country's most-capped player. He was first called up to the national team in August 2011, before making his debut on 1 September, in an 8–0 defeat to New Caledonia at the 2011 Pacific Games. Overall, he's represented Tuvalu at four tournaments, including the Pacific Games in 2011, 2019, and 2023, as well as the 2017 Pacific Mini Games, where Tuvalu finished fourth. Additionally, he represented Tuvalu at the 2018 CONIFA World Football Cup in England, where he saved two penalties against Matabeleland and the Tamil Eelam national team.

In 2025, Iosua represented the Tuvalu national futsal team at the 2025 OFC Futsal Men's Cup, where despite conceding 20 goals in four matches, he was considered the team's best player, with some claiming he should win the tournament's Golden Glove award, which eventually went to Solomon Islands goalkeeper by Cliff Sasau.
