= Ersid Pllumbaj =

Albanian footballer (born 1989)

Personal information
- Date of birth: 26 April 1989 (age 37)
- Place of birth: Bajzë, Albania
- Height: 1.80 m (5 ft 11 in)
- Position: Forward

Youth career
- –2007: Novara

Senior career*
Years	Team	Apps	(Gls)
2007–2008	Momo	27	(16)
2008–2009	Cerano	25	(20)
2009–2010	Borgopal		
2010–2014	Gattinara	100	(79)
2014	Omegna	17	(9)
2014–2015	Ivrea	31	(18)
2015–2016	Ascona	25	(22)
2016–2017	Milano City	32	(18)
2017–2018	Virtus CiseranoBergamo	26	(18)
2018	Pro Patria	1	(0)
2018–2019	Arzignano Valchiampo	17	(6)
2019	Crema	0	(0)
2019–2020	Legnano	5	(0)
Total		300	(206)

International career
2018	Padania	4	(1)
- * Club domestic league appearances and goals

Ersid Pllumbaj (born 26 April 1989) is an Albanian former footballer who played as a forward.

== Club career ==
=== Early life ===
Pllumbaj was born in 1989 in Albania. He moved to Italy at the age of fourteen. As a youth player, Pllumbaj joined the youth academy of Italian side Novara.

=== Senior career ===
Until the age of twenty-five, he played in the Italian sixth and fifth tiers before playing in the Italian fourth tier. One of those clubs was Italian side Ivrea, who he signed for in 2014. He was regarded as an important player in the Italian lower leagues. After that, he signed for Italian third-tier side Pro Patria, but he failed to establish himself in the squad and did not get consistent playing time. Besides Italy, Pllumbaj has played senior club football in Switzerland. In 2019, he signed for Italian side Legnano, which would become the last professional club he would play for.

Previously, he played for Italian side Crema, but he failed to establish himself in the squad and did not get consistent playing time due to a physical issue. At the age of thirty-two, he retired from professional football due to health problems. He played his last professional game on 16 February 2020.

== International career ==
Pllumbaj has represented the Padania national football team at the CONIFA World Football Cup.

== Post-playing career ==
After retirement, Pllumbaj worked as a football club director.

== Style of play ==
Pllumbaj mainly operates as a center-forward. He can also operate as a winger, is right-footed, and is known for his shooting and dribbling ability.

== Personal life ==
Pllumbaj has had Dunbar syndrome, a physical condition. He has lived in Novara, Italy, with his partner, and has cited Ukraine international Andriy Shevchenko as his football idol.
