= Tuvalu national football team =

National association football team

Tuvalu
- Association: Tuvalu Islands Football Association (TIFA)
- Confederation: OFC (Oceania)
- Head coach: Robert Maaskant
- Most caps: Katepu Iosua (15)
- Top scorer: Alopua Petoa (9)
- Home stadium: Tuvalu Sports Ground
- FIFA code: TUV
First colours

First international
- Tahiti 18–0 Tuvalu (Suva, Fiji; 29 August 1979)

Biggest win
- Tuvalu 4–0 American Samoa (Nouméa, New Caledonia; 27 August 2011); Tonga 0–4 Tuvalu (Honiara, Solomon Islands; 27 November 2023)

Biggest defeat
- Tahiti 18–0 Tuvalu (Suva, Fiji; 29 August 1979)

The Tuvalu national football team is the international football team of Tuvalu. Football in Tuvalu is played at the club and international level. The Tuvalu national team draws players from the Tuvalu A-Division and trains at the Tuvalu Sports Ground at Funafuti. The national team competes in the Pacific Games, and is controlled by the Tuvalu Islands Football Association, which is an associate member of the Oceania Football Confederation (OFC) but not a member of FIFA.

== About ==
Tuvalu is a member of the Oceania Football Confederation (OFC), but not of FIFA, though the country has been attempting to join the global governing body since 1987. In September 2008, Tuvaluan Prime Minister Apisai Ielemia and the President of the Tuvalu Football Association, Tapugao Falefou, visited the headquarters of FIFA in Zürich, hoping to gain full membership in the organisation. In December 2013, OFC General Secretariat Tai Nicholas named Tuvalu's lack of a regulation pitch as the main factor preventing the country from being accepted into FIFA. The Tuvalu Football Association continues to seek membership of FIFA with the Dutch Support Tuvalu Foundation assisting Tuvalu with the FIFA application and with the development of football in Tuvalu.

In November 2016 Tuvalu became a member of the Confederation of Independent Football Associations (CONIFA). On 7 March 2018 it was announced that Tuvalu would replace Kiribati in the 2018 ConIFA World Football Cup in London. On 9 June 2018, Tuvalu recorded their biggest ever victory in a 6–1 win over the Chagos Islands. Sometime around 2020, Tuvalu would leave CONIFA and they are no longer listed as members of the organisation.

A vote to grant Tuvalu and Kiribati full member status in the OFC is expected to be held at the confederation's March 2027 congress. Ahead of the vote, the team is hosting the 2027 Four Nations Cup in Auckland the two months prior to the congress with Robert Maaskant as the team's manager.

== Stadium ==
Tuvalu has never played a home international match. The team trains at the only sports venue in Tuvalu, the 1,500-seat Tuvalu Sports Ground. The Tuvalu government has planned to build a new, modern facility with an artificial turf surface and a seating capacity of at least 3,000.

== Competition history ==
=== 1979 South Pacific Games ===
The Tuvaluan team, captained by Karl Tili, played three international matches at the 1979 South Pacific Games, with Kokea Malu as the coach. In Tuvalu's first international match, they were defeated by Tahiti 18–0; which is still its worst defeat to this day. However, in their next match, the team recorded a large 5–3 victory against Tonga. The victory against Tonga sent the team to the next round, where Tuvalu was defeated by New Caledonia 11–0. The next game was against Kiribati, which was drawn 3–3; however Tuvalu won the penalty shootout 4–2 to advance to the semi-finals of the consolation tournament for fifth place; in that round Tuvalu was defeated by Guam 7–2, who eventually won sixth place after losing the fifth-place match.

=== 2003 South Pacific Games ===
In a warm-up match for the 2003 South Pacific Games, Tuvalu played a friendly game against Fiji and were defeated 9–0. Tuvalu also participated in four games at the 2003 South Pacific Games again held in Fiji, with Tim Jerks as the coach. After defeating Kiribati 3–2 in their opening game, Tuvalu played Fiji again, but were defeated with a more respectable 4–0. In the game against Vanuatu, Tuvalu was narrowly defeated 1–0. In the final game of the tournament against Solomon Islands, the Tuvaluan squad was defeated 4–0. Tuvalu finished fourth out of five in Pool A, above Kiribati.

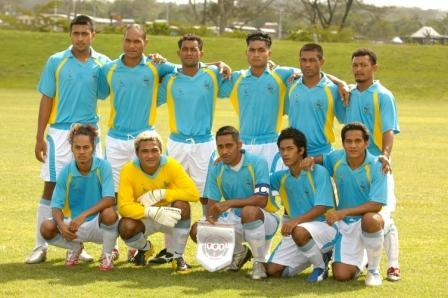
Team Tuvalu, Pacific Games 2007

=== 2007 World Cup and OFC Nations Cup qualifications ===
In 2007, with Toakai Puapua as the coach, and Petio Semaia as the captain, Tuvalu became the first non FIFA member to participate in an official World Cup qualifying match. The situation arose when the regional governing body used the football competition at the 2007 South Pacific Games, as the first stage of the qualification tournament for the 2010 FIFA World Cup and qualification tournament for the 2008 OFC Nations Cup. In Tuvalu's South Pacific Games debut, they were defeated 16–0 by Fiji. However Tuvalu fought hard in the next match against New Caledonia (who were joint leaders of the competition) and only lost 1–0. Tuvalu then drew 1–1 with Tahiti, with a late equaliser from Viliamu Sekifu. In the last group stage match the Cook Islands, coached by Tim Jerks (who had previously coached Tuvalu), defeated them 4–1. Tuvalu finished last in the group with one point.

=== 2011 Pacific Games ===
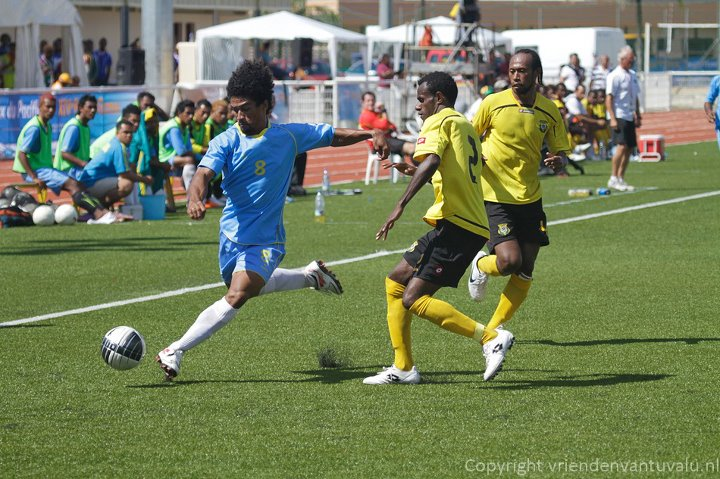
Okilani Tinilau in action against Vanuatu (2011)

In 2011 the Tuvalu National Football Association signed Dutch coach Foppe de Haan as the coach on a part-time and volunteer basis. De Haan previously coached SC Heerenveen, Ajax Cape Town and the Dutch national U-21 team. De Haan began his tenure with a 3–0 victory over Samoa in a warm-up match for the 2011 Pacific Games, and striker Alopua Petoa scored a hat-trick. De Haan's second match in charge saw a record 4–0 victory recorded over American Samoa in the first match of their 2011 Pacific Games campaign, with another hat-trick from 19-year-old Alopua Petoa. The third match was not as successful, with the side going down 5–1 to Vanuatu. After losing 8–0 to New Caledonia, and 6–1 to Solomon Islands, the Tuvaluan team drew with Guam 1–1. The squad finished equal with Guam in Pool A with four points, which was the best performance by Tuvalu in an international tournament at the time. De Haan left his post after the tournament to rejoin Heerenveen's youth programme.

=== 2013 Netherlands tour ===
The national football team of Tuvalu has received support from the Dutch Support Tuvalu Foundation, an organization from the Netherlands. On 18 August 2013, the Tuvalu national football team went on a three-month tour of the Netherlands. During this tour they played at least 20 friendly matches against local amateur football clubs. Former NAC Breda and De Graafschap coach Leen Looijen was the team's mentor during training in the Netherlands, with the tour organised by the Dutch Support Tuvalu Foundation. The Tuvalu team and the activities of the Dutch Support Tuvalu Foundation are the focus of Mission Tuvalu (Missie Tuvalu), a 2013 feature documentary directed by Jeroen van den Kroonenberg.

=== 2023 Pacific Games ===
In November 2023, Tuvalu were scheduled to participate in the 2023 Pacific Games in the Solomon Islands. However, due to arriving late for their opening game against Papua New Guinea, their opponents were awarded a 3–0 walkover win. A subsequent 0–6 loss to Vanuatu meant that Tuvalu finished bottom of their group and faced a playoff game against Tonga which they won 4–0. They played their last game of the tournament, the 9th Place Play off, against the Northern Mariana Islands which they won 4–1.

== Coaching history ==
- (Tuvalu) Kokea Malu (1979)
- (Australia) Tim Jerks (2003)
- (Tuvalu) Toakai Puapua (2007)
- (Netherlands) Foppe de Haan (2011)
- (Netherlands) Leen Looijen (2013)
- (Tuvalu) Taukiei Ituaso (2017)
- (Tuvalu) Lopati Taupili (2018)
- (Tuvalu) Mati Fusi (2019)
- (Tuvalu) Osamesa Mesako (2023)
- (Netherlands) Robert Maaskant (2026)

== Results and fixtures ==
The following is a list of match results in the last 12 months, as well as any future matches that have been scheduled.

Win Draw Loss Fixture

=== 2027 ===
23-30 January 2027 2027 Four Nations Cup	Tuvalu	v	Kiribati	Auckland, New Zealand

23-30 January 2027 2027 Four Nations Cup	Tuvalu	v	Cook Islands	Auckland, New Zealand

23-30 January 2027 2027 Four Nations Cup	Tuvalu	v	Tonga	Auckland, New Zealand

== Players ==
=== Current squad ===
The following players were called up for the 2023 Pacific Games.

Caps and goals updated as of 30 November 2023 after the game against Northern Mariana Islands.

No.	Pos.	Player	Date of birth (age)	Caps	Goals	Club
1	GK	Katepu Iosua	11 May 1988 (age 38)	15	0	(Tuvalu Islands Football Association) Tofaga
13	GK	Kioa Elisala		1	0	(New Zealand Football) Oratia United
2	DF	John Tuilagi	10 June 1999 (age 27)	3	0	(Tuvalu Islands Football Association) Niutao
3	DF	Fakafou Uriam		2	0	
4	DF	Aloesi Nukualofa	5 February 1994 (age 32)	2	0	(Tuvalu Islands Football Association) Manu Laeva
5	DF	Siale Sopoaga		2	0	
15	DF	Sepetaio Nokisi	11 September 1993 (age 33)	7	0	(New Zealand Football) Te Atatu
16	DF	Tekie Tumau		2	0	
19	DF	Maalosi Alefaio	19 January 1993 (age 33)	6	0	(New Zealand Football) Te Atatu
25	DF	Jason Alama	31 October 2002 (age 24)	3	0	(New Zealand Football) Western Springs
6	MF	Saulo Haulangi		1	0	(Tuvalu Islands Football Association) Lakena United
7	MF	Paulo Vailine	11 February 2002 (age 24)	3	0	(Tuvalu Islands Football Association) Nauti
8	MF	Andrew Pelekata		3	3	(Tuvalu Islands Football Association) Nauti
14	MF	Niuatea Luka		1	0	(Tuvalu Islands Football Association) Niutao
17	MF	Metia Lisati		0	0	
20	MF	Matti Ualesi	23 May 1992 (age 34)	7	3	(Tuvalu Islands Football Association) Lakena United
22	MF	Tulimanu Lisati		1	0	(Football Australia) Stormbirds
23	MF	Falaima Mokeni	29 March 2002 (age 24)	3	0	(New Zealand Football) Te Atatu
9	FW	Iasona Lui		2	0	(Tuvalu Islands Football Association) Tofaga
11	FW	Keni Vine		3	2	
12	FW	Asaia Eliko		1	0	(Tuvalu Islands Football Association) Nauti
18	FW	Yvan Sapele		3	1	(New Zealand Football) Wainuiomata
24	FW	Teuati Tamatoa		2	0	

== Player records ==
As of 30 November 2023
Players in bold are still active with Tuvalu.

=== Most appearances ===
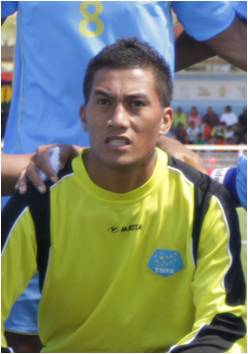
Katepu Iosua is Tuvalu's most capped player with 15 appearances.

Rank	Name	Caps	Goals	Career
1	**Katepu Iosua**	15	0	2011–present
2	Alopua Petoa	13	9	2011–2019
3	Mau Penisula	12	0	2003–2011
4	**Joshua Tui Tapasei**	11	0	2003–present
4	**Sosene Vailine**	11	3	2017–present
6	Jelly Selau	10	0	2007–2019
7	James Lepaio	9	1	2011–2019
7	Etimoni Timuani	9	1	2011–2019
9	Paenui Fagota	7	1	2003–2007
9	**Matti Uaelesi**	7	3	2017–present

=== Top goalscorers ===
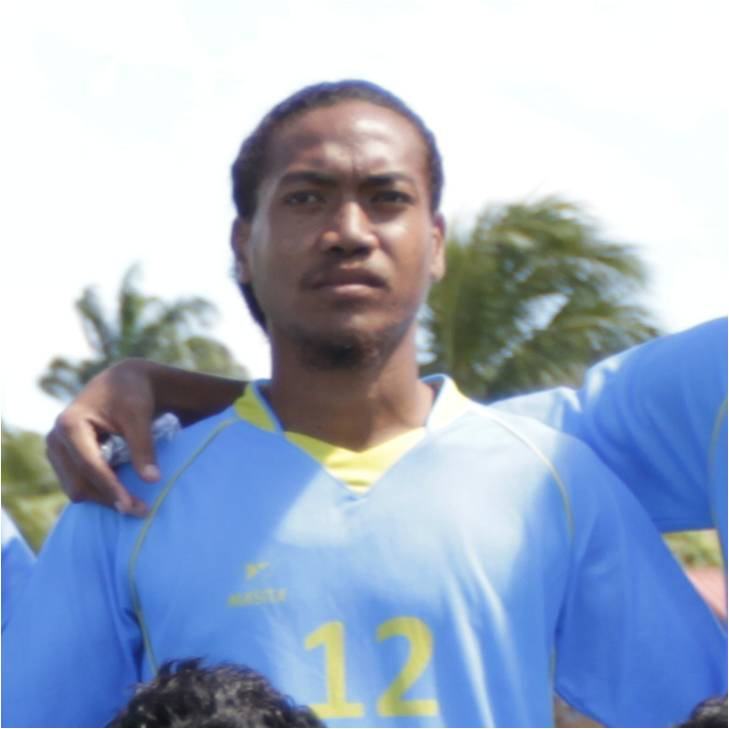
Alopua Petoa is the national team's top scorer with 9 goals.

Rank	Name	Goals	Caps	Ratio	Career
1	Alopua Petoa	9	13	0.69	2011–2019
2	Saifoloi Metia Tealofi	5	–	–	1979
3	**Andrew Pelekata**	3	3	1	2023–present
3	**Matti Uaelesi**	3	7	0.43	2017–present
3	**Sosene Vailine**	3	11	0.27	2017–present
6	**Keni Vine**	2	3	0.67	2023–present

== Competitive record ==
=== OFC Nations Cup ===
Tuvalu has been affiliated with OFC since 2006, so they can play in the competition.

Oceania Cup / OFC Nations Cup record										Qualification record					
Year	Host	Result	Position	Pld	W	D	L	GF	GA	Pld	W	D	L	GF	GA
1973	New Zealand	Not a member of OFC								Not a member of OFC					
1980	New Caledonia	Not a member of OFC								Not a member of OFC					
1996	Oceania	Not a member of OFC								Not a member of OFC					
1998	Australia	Not a member of OFC								Not a member of OFC					
2000	Tahiti	Not a member of OFC								Not a member of OFC					
2002	New Zealand	Not a member of OFC								Not a member of OFC					
2004	Australia	Not a member of OFC								Not a member of OFC					
2008	Oceania	Did not qualify								4	0	1	3	2	22
2012	Solomon Islands	Ineligible to participate								Ineligible to participate					
2016	Papua New Guinea	Ineligible to participate								Ineligible to participate					
2024	Vanuatu, Fiji	Ineligible to participate								Ineligible to participate					
Total		—	0/11	–	–	–	–	–	–	4	0	1	3	2	22

=== Pacific Games ===
Pacific Games record
Year	Host	Round	Position	Pld	W	D	L	GF	GA
1963 to 1975		Did not enter							
1979	Fiji	Quarter-finals	8th	5	1	1	3	10	42
1983 to 1995		Did not enter							
2003	Fiji	Group stage	8th	4	1	0	3	3	11
2007	Samoa	Group stage	9th	4	0	1	3	2	22
2011	New Caledonia	Group stage	7th	5	1	1	3	7	20
2015	Papua New Guinea	N/A – Tournament was U23							
2019	Samoa	Group stage	10th	5	0	1	4	2	42
2023	Solomon Islands	Group stage	9th	4	2	0	2	8	10
Total		Quarter-finals	6/16	27	5	4	18	32	147

=== Pacific Mini Games ===
Pacific Mini Games record
Year	Host	Round	Position	Pld	W	D	L	GF	GA
1981 to 1993		Did not enter							
2017	Vanuatu	Fourth place	4th	5	2	0	3	6	28
Total		Fourth place	1/3	5	2	0	3	6	28

=== ConIFA World Football Cup ===
ConIFA World Football Cup record
Year	Host	Round	Position	Pld	W	D	L	GF	GA
2014 to 2016		Did not enter							
2018	Barawa	Group stage	15th	5	0	0	5	4	24
Total		Group stage	1/3	5	0	0	5	4	24

=== Head-to-head record ===
Team	Pld	W	D	L	GF	GA	GD	WPCT
American Samoa	2	1	1	0	5	1	+4	50.00
Cook Islands	1	0	0	1	1	4	−3	0.00
Fiji	5	0	0	5	1	47	−46	0.00
Guam	2	0	1	1	3	8	−5	0.00
Kiribati	2	1	1	0	6	5	+1	50.00
New Caledonia	5	1	0	4	2	32	−30	20.00
Northern Mariana Islands	1	1	0	0	4	1	+3	100.00
Samoa	1	1	0	0	3	0	+3	100.00
Solomon Islands	4	0	0	4	1	29	−28	0.00
Tahiti	3	0	1	2	1	26	−25	0.00
Tonga	3	3	0	0	13	6	+7	100.00
Vanuatu	4	0	0	4	1	22	−21	0.00
Total	33	8	4	21	41	181	−140	24.24

Source: Results

Team	Pld	W	D	L	GF	GA	GD	WPCT
Chagos Islands	1	1	0	0	6	1	+5	100.00
Matabeleland	1	0	0	1	1	3	−2	0.00
Padania	1	0	0	1	0	8	−8	0.00
Székely Land	1	0	0	1	0	4	−4	0.00
Tamil Eelam	1	0	0	1	3	4	−1	0.00
United Koreans in Japan	1	0	0	1	0	5	−5	0.00
Total	6	1	0	5	10	25	−15	16.67

Source: Results

== See also ==
- Tuvalu at the Pacific Games
- Tuvalu national under-17 football team
