= Kiribati national football team =

Men's national association football team

Kiribati
- Nickname: Te Eitei
- Association: Kiribati Islands Football Federation (KIFF)
- Confederation: OFC (Oceania)
- Head coach: Pine Iosefa
- Most caps: Nabaruru Batiri (8)
- Top scorer: Lawrence Neemia (2)
- Home stadium: Bairiki National Stadium
- FIFA code: KIR
First colours	Second colours

FIFA ranking
- Current: NR (18 November 2026)

First international
- Fiji 24–0 Kiribati (Nausori, Fiji; 30 August 1979)

Biggest win
- Unofficial; Kiribati 3–1 Fiji U17 (Suva, Fiji; 10 October 2026); Official; None

Biggest defeat
- Fiji 24–0 Kiribati (Nausori, Fiji; 30 August 1979)

Pacific Games
- Appearances: 3 (first in 1979)
- Best result: Group stage (1979, 2003, 2011); 9th place (1979)

The Kiribati men's national football team is the national men's football team of Kiribati and is controlled by the Kiribati Islands Football Association. Kiribati is not a member of FIFA but is an associate member of the Oceania Football Confederation (OFC), and is therefore not eligible to enter the FIFA World Cup but may enter the OFC Nations Cup. It became a provisional member of the N.F.-Board on 10 December 2005.

== Background ==
Kiribati have only ever played 11 International matches up to April 2012 where they scored 7 goals and conceded 125. All of these matches were played away from home due to the lack of grass pitches in the archipelago. The Bairiki National Stadium has a sand pitch rather than grass. Kiribati's first match took place in Fiji on 30 August 1979 when they played Fiji, losing 24–0 in a South Pacific Games match. The side have never won a match but came very close when they lost 3–2 to fellow minnows Tuvalu on 30 June 2003 in Pool A of the South Pacific Games in Fiji, as well as losing 4–2 in penalties to Tuvalu in the consolation round of the 1979 South Pacific Games. Kiribati's only two goals in the 2011 Pacific games were scored by Karotu Bakaane versus Papua New Guinea and Erene Bakineti versus Tahiti, but in the 2003 competition, both goals against Tuvalu came from Lawrence Nemeia on the 26th minute and the 46th minute.

In 2012, Scotsman Kevin McGreskin became the team's coach, with the aim of improving its results and obtaining recognition from FIFA.

On 10 April 2015, Jake Kewley was officially appointed as the Manager and Ambassador for the Kiribati Islands National Football Team with the remit of liaising with the relevant footballing bodies to advance Kiribati's prior membership applications, with a FIFA application being drafted, finalised and submitted later that year.

On 6 May 2016, Kiribati was formally accepted as the newest member of ConIFA (Confederation of Independent Football Associations), becoming the first ever Oceanic member to join the federation. Kiribati hosted an official visit from ConIFA in November 2016 for the national football competition in Tarawa – Taiwan Sport Tournament – with ConIFA documenting the tournament whilst in the country. Kiribati qualified for the 2018 ConIFA World Football Cup held in England, but were forced to withdraw and were replaced with Tuvalu. The team were also entered in the 2023 Pacific Games, but withdrew a fortnight before the tournament began.

On October 8, 2026, 47 years after its debut as a national team, Kiribati won its first-ever match, handing a historic 6–0 thrashing to the Fijian football team Nadroga in a game played as part of the Fiji Inter-District Championship, a regional amateur football tournament.

== History ==
=== Early years and Pacific Games ===
Kiribati made its international debut at the 1979 South Pacific Games in Fiji. The team was represented by the Flying Tigers club from South Tarawa and played its first match on 30 August 1979, losing 24–0 to Fiji. Kiribati subsequently lost 13–0 to Papua New Guinea, before drawing 3–3 with Tuvalu in the consolation tournament. Tuvalu won the match on penalties.

Kiribati did not return to the Pacific Games football tournament until 2003, when the team lost all four of its group matches, against Tuvalu, the Solomon Islands, Fiji and Vanuatu.

The national team made its third Pacific Games appearance at the 2011 Pacific Games in New Caledonia. Kiribati again failed to progress from the group stage, suffering defeats including a 17–1 loss to Papua New Guinea and a 17–1 loss to Tahiti.

=== International isolation and membership efforts ===
After several years of international inactivity, the Kiribati Islands Football Association joined CONIFA in 2016. The organisation subsequently visited Kiribati and held discussions about the national team's participation in future CONIFA competitions. According to CONIFA, Kiribati had previously applied for membership of the Oceania Football Confederation and FIFA in the early 2000s without being admitted.

Kiribati qualified for the 2018 CONIFA World Football Cup in London, but withdrew before the tournament because of financial constraints and was replaced by Tuvalu.

Kiribati was scheduled to return to the Pacific Games at the 2023 Pacific Games in the Solomon Islands, which would have been the men's national team's first appearance at the tournament since 2011. However, the team withdrew shortly before the Games began.

=== Renewed international ambitions ===
In 2026, the Kiribati Islands Football Federation renewed its efforts to gain full membership of the Oceania Football Confederation and FIFA, with the stated ambition of entering qualification for the 2030 FIFA World Cup.

In 2026, OFC officials also conducted their first official visit to Kiribati, delivering development programmes in coaching, refereeing, futsal and beach soccer. Federation president Eriati Reebo said that Kiribati aimed to be able to compete internationally and regionally within three years.

== Coaching history ==
- (Kiribati) Pine Iosefa (2003–2011)
- (Scotland) Kevin McGreskin (2012)
- (England) Jake Kewley (2015–2026)
- (Kiribati) Pine Iosefa (2026–present)

== Fixtures and results ==
=== 2026 ===
6 October 2026 2026 FMF Inter-District Championship	Kiribati	2–4	(Fiji) Seaqaqa FC	Suva, Fiji
	Teweia Butibara; Bauro Martin Jr.	Report		Stadium: HFC Bank Stadium

7 October 2026 2026 FMF Inter-District Championship	Kiribati	6–0	(Fiji) Nadroga FC	Suva, Fiji
	Bauro Martin Jr.,, Nabetari Itiata; Booia Maitina; Kiniore Teofilo Siu	Report		Stadium: HFC Bank Stadium

10 October 2026 2026 FMF Inter-District Championship Semi-final	Kiribati	3–1	Fiji U17	Suva, Fiji
	Peter Diehm; Bauro Martin Jr.; Nabetari Itiata	Report		Stadium: HFC Bank Stadium

10 October 2026 2026 FMF Inter-District Championship Final	Kiribati	6–1	(Fiji) Seaqaqa FC	Suva, Fiji
	Nabetari Itiata 27', 62'; Peter Diehm 72', 89'; Kiniore Siu 77'; Bauro Martin Jr. 80'	Report		Stadium: HFC Bank Stadium

=== 2027 ===
January 2027 2027 Four Nations Cup	Kiribati	v	Tuvalu	Auckland, New Zealand

January 2027 2027 Four Nations Cup	Kiribati	v	Tonga	Auckland, New Zealand

January 2027 2027 Four Nations Cup	Kiribati	v	Cook Islands	Auckland, New Zealand

== Last squad ==
Squad selected for the 2011 Pacific Games.
Players' club teams and players' age as of 27 August 2011 – the tournament's opening day

No.	Pos.	Player	Date of birth (age)	Caps	Goals	Club
1	GK	Tarariki Tarotu	27 July 1974 (aged 37)	6	0	
12	GK	Tiaon Miika	4 November 1992 (aged 18)	3	0	
3	DF	Kaake Kamta	28 August 1980 (aged 30)	3	0	
4	DF	Kaben Ioteba	24 February 1992 (aged 19)	4	0	(Kiribati Islands Football Federation) Makin
5	DF	Enri Tenukai	17 December 1985 (aged 25)	4	0	(Kiribati Islands Football Federation) Betio Urban Council
6	DF	Nabaruru Batiri	1 December 1984 (aged 26)	8	0	
2	DF	Beniamina Kaintikuaba	3 December 1993 (aged 17)	2	0	(Kiribati Islands Football Federation) Marakei
16	DF	Barurunteiti Kaiorake	1 April 1980 (aged 31)	1	0	(Kiribati Islands Football Federation) Betio Urban Council
7	MF	Atanuea Eritara	24 October 1992 (aged 18)	4	0	(Kiribati Islands Football Federation) Marakei
9	MF	Atino Baraniko	6 April 1985 (aged 26)	1	0	(Kiribati Islands Football Federation) Betio Urban Council
10	MF	Jeff Jong	4 April 1971 (aged 40)	3	0	(Kiribati Islands Football Federation) Marakei
15	MF	Martin Miriata	27 May 1994 (aged 17)	4	0	(Kiribati Islands Football Federation) Makin
17	MF	Biitamatang Keakea	26 March 1989 (aged 22)	4	0	(Kiribati Islands Football Federation) Betio Urban Council
18	MF	Tongarua Akori	30 June 1983 (aged 28)	2	0	
19	MF	Lawrence Nemeia	12 November 1977 (aged 33)	3	2	
14	FW	Karotu Bakaane	20 April 1987 (aged 24)	3	1	(Kiribati Islands Football Federation) Betio Urban Council
13	FW	Erene Bwakineti	2 July 1982 (aged 29)	3	1	(Kiribati Islands Football Federation) Marakei
8	FW	Antin Nanotaake	3 July 1982 (aged 29)	4	0	(Kiribati Islands Football Federation) Betio Urban Council
11	FW	Joseph Yan	25 January 1993 (aged 18)	3	0	(Kiribati Islands Football Federation) Tarawa Urban Council

== Player records ==
As of 5 September 2011

Most appearances
Rank	Name	Caps	Goals	Career
1	Nabaruru Batiri	8	0	2003–2011
2	Tarariki Tarotu	6	0	2003–2011
3	Tebwaia Baikawa	4	0	2003
3	Naingimea Beiaruru	4	0	2003
3	Atanuea Eritara	4	0	2011
3	Kaben Ioteba	4	0	2011
3	Ruevita Iotin	4	0	2003
3	Nabuaka Itimaroroa	4	0	2003
3	Tokabi Kaiorake	4	0	2003
3	Biitamatang Keakea	4	0	2011
3	Ukenio Kobuti	4	0	2003
3	Martin Miriata	4	0	2011
3	Antin Nanotaake	4	0	2011
3	Enri Tenukai	4	0	2011

Top goalscorers
Rank	Name	Goals	Caps	Ratio	Career
1	Lawrence Nemeia	2	3	0.67	2003
2	Karotu Bakaane	1	3	0.33	2011
2	Erene Bwakineti	1	3	0.33	2011

Note: Missing goalscorers from 1979.

== Competitive record ==
=== Pacific Games Record ===
Pacific Games
Year	Host	Round	Pld	W	D	L	F	A	Source
1963 to 1975		Did not enter							
1979	Fiji	Group stage	3	0	1	2	3	40	
1983 to 1995		Did not enter							
2003	Fiji	Group stage	4	0	0	4	2	40	
2007	Samoa	Did not enter							
2011	New Caledonia	Group stage	4	0	0	4	2	46	
2015	Papua New Guinea	Did not enter							
2019	Samoa	Did not enter							
2023	Solomon Islands	Withdrew							
Total			11	0	1	10	7	126	

Notes

1. A: The men's football tournament at the 2015 Pacific Games was an age-restricted competition that doubled as the OFC Men's Olympic Qualifying Tournament.

== Head-to-head record ==
Team	Pld	W	D	L	GF	GA	GD	WPCT
Cook Islands	1	0	0	1	0	3	−3	0.00
Fiji	3	0	0	3	0	45	−45	0.00
Papua New Guinea	2	0	0	2	1	30	−29	0.00
Solomon Islands	1	0	0	1	0	7	−7	0.00
Tahiti	1	0	0	1	1	17	−16	0.00
Tuvalu	2	0	1	1	5	6	−1	0.00
Vanuatu	1	0	0	1	0	18	−18	0.00
Total	11	0	1	10	7	126	−119	0.00

Source: Results

== Results ==
Kiribati's score is shown first in each case.

No.	Date	Venue	Opponents	Score	Competition	Kiribati scorers	Att.	Ref.
1	30 August 1979	Ratu Cakobau Park, Nausori (N)	Fiji	0–24	1979 South Pacific Games		—	
2	31 August 1979	Bidesi Park, Suva (N)	Papua New Guinea	0–13	1979 South Pacific Games		—	
3	5 September 1979	Ratu Cakobau Park, Nausori	Tuvalu	3–3 (2–4 p)	1979 South Pacific Games	Unknown	—	
4	30 June 2003	National Stadium, Suva (N)	Tuvalu	2–3	2003 South Pacific Games	Nemeia (2)	—	
5	3 July 2003	National Stadium, Suva (N)	Solomon Islands	0–7	2003 South Pacific Games		700	
6	5 July 2003	Ratu Cakobau Park, Nausori (N)	Fiji	0–12	2003 South Pacific Games		4,000	
7	7 July 2003	Churchill Park, Lautoka (N)	Vanuatu	0–18	2003 South Pacific Games		2,000	
8	30 August 2011	Stade Boewa, Boulari Bay (N)	Fiji	0–9	2011 Pacific Games		—	
9	1 September 2011	Stade Boewa, Boulari Bay (N)	Cook Islands	0–3	2011 Pacific Games		—	
10	3 September 2011	Stade Boewa, Boulari Bay (N)	Papua New Guinea	1–17	2011 Pacific Games	Bakaane	—	
11	5 September 2011	Stade Boewa, Boulari Bay (N)	Tahiti	1–17	2011 Pacific Games	Bwakineti	—	
12	January 2027		Tuvalu	–	2027 Four Nations Cup		—	
13	January 2027		Tonga	–	2027 Four Nations Cup		—	
14	January 2027		Cook Islands	–	2027 Four Nations Cup		—	

== Historical kits ==
1979; South Pacific Games	2003 Home	2011 Home	2011 Away	2026 Home

== See also ==
- Kiribati national futsal team
