= New Zealand men's national under-23 football team results (2020–present) =

This article lists the results for the New Zealand men's national under-23 football team from 2020 to present.

== Key ==
Key to matches

- Att. = Match attendance
- (H) = Home ground
- (A) = Away ground
- (N) = Neutral ground

Key to record by opponent

- Pld = Games played
- W = Games won
- D = Games drawn
- L = Games lost
- GF = Goals for
- GA = Goals against

== A-International results ==
New Zealand's score is shown first in each case.

New Zealand national football team results
No.	Date	Venue	Opponents	Score	Competition	New Zealand scorers	Att.	Ref.
72	12 July 2021	ZA Oripri Stadium, Ichihara (N)	Australia	2–0	Friendly	Wood, Just	—	
73	15 July 2021	ZA Oripri Stadium, Ichihara (N)	Australia	0–1	Friendly		—	
74	22 July 2021	Kashima Stadium, Kashima (N)	South Korea	1–0	2020 Summer Olympics	Wood	0	
75	25 July 2021	Kashima Stadium, Kashima (N)	Honduras	2–3	2020 Summer Olympics	Cacace, Wood	0	
76	28 July 2021	Sapporo Dome, Sapporo (N)	Romania	0–0	2020 Summer Olympics		0	
77	31 July 2021	Kashima Stadium, Kashima (N)	Japan	0–0 (2–4p)	2020 Summer Olympics		0	
78	23 March 2023	Mount Smart Stadium, Auckland (H)	China	2–0	Friendly	Sutton, Bidois	—	
79	26 March 2023	Sky Stadium, Wellington (H)	China	2–1	Friendly	Old, Herdman	—	
—	27 August 2023	Go Media Stadium, Auckland (H)	Papua New Guinea	w/o	2023 OFC Men's Olympic Qualifying Tournament		—	
80	30 August 2023	Go Media Stadium, Auckland (H)	Fiji	3–1	2023 OFC Men's Olympic Qualifying Tournament	Toomey, Ott, Randall	531	
81	6 September 2023	Go Media Stadium, Auckland (H)	Vanuatu	8–0	2023 OFC Men's Olympic Qualifying Tournament	Randall (2), van Hattum (2), Ott, Verney, Raj (2)	188	
82	9 September 2023	North Harbour Stadium, Auckland (H)	Fiji	9–0	2023 OFC Men's Olympic Qualifying Tournament	Bidois (5), Randall, Gillion, Turagalailai (o.g.), Kelly	1,284	
83	18 July 2023	Stade de Nice, Nice (N)	Uzbekistan	1–3	Friendly	Randall	—	
84	24 July 2024	Stade de Nice, Nice (N)	Guinea	2–1	2024 Summer Olympics	Garbett, Waine	4,909	
85	27 July 2024	Stade de Marseille, Marseille (N)	United States	1–4	2024 Summer Olympics	Randall	9,468	
86	30 July 2024	Stade de Marseille, Marseille (A)	France	0–3	2024 Summer Olympics		45,790	

Notes

1. A: Match held behind closed doors due to the COVID-19 pandemic in Asia.
2. B: Papua New Guinea were unable to travel to New Zealand prior to their scheduled match on 27 August. The matter was resolved by awarding New Zealand with a 3–0 win.

== Record by opponent ==
Team	Pld	W	D	L	GF	GA	GD	WPCT
Australia	2	1	0	1	2	1	+1	50.00
China	2	2	0	0	4	1	+3	100.00
France	1	0	0	1	0	3	−3	0.00
Fiji	2	2	0	0	12	1	+11	100.00
Guinea	1	1	0	0	2	1	+1	100.00
Honduras	1	0	0	1	2	3	−1	0.00
Japan	1	0	1	0	0	0	0	0.00
Romania	1	0	1	0	0	0	0	0.00
South Korea	1	1	0	0	1	0	+1	100.00
United States	1	0	0	1	1	4	−3	0.00
Uzbekistan	1	0	0	1	1	3	−2	0.00
Vanuatu	1	1	0	0	8	0	+8	100.00
Total	15	8	2	5	33	17	+16	53.33

Source: Results

== See also ==
- New Zealand men's national under-23 football team
- New Zealand men's national under-23 football team results (1992–2019)
