= 2023 OFC Men's Olympic Qualifying Tournament =

10th edition of OFC Men's Olympic qualifiers

2023 Men's Olympic Qualification Tournament

Tournament details
- Host country: New Zealand
- Dates: 27 August – 9 September
- Teams: 8 (from 1 confederation)
- Venue: 3 (in 1 host city)

Final positions
- Champions: New Zealand (5th title)
- Runners-up: Fiji

Tournament statistics
- Matches played: 11
- Goals scored: 49 (4.45 per match)
- Top scorer: (New Zealand) Riley Bidois (5 goals)

The 2023 OFC Men's Olympic Qualifying Tournament was the 10th edition of the tournament to select the OFC representative at the Summer Olympics. The tournament was held in Auckland, New Zealand from 27 August to 9 September, with the winner qualifying for the 2024 Summer Olympics.

New Zealand successfully defended their title as the OFC representative.

== Teams ==
Eight of the 11 FIFA-affiliated national teams from the OFC indicated their intent to participate in the tournament.

Team	Appearance	Previous best performance
~~American Samoa~~	~~4th~~	~~Group stage (2004, 2012, 2019)~~
Fiji	9th	Champions (2015)
New Zealand (hosts)	10th	Champions (1999, 2008, 2012, 2019)
Papua New Guinea	8th	Third place (2015)
Samoa	4th	Group stage (1999, 2004, 2019)
Solomon Islands	8th	Runners-up (1999, 2008, 2019)
Tonga	5th	Group stage (1999, 2004, 2012, 2019)
Vanuatu	8th	Runners-up (2015)

Did not enter

- Cook Islands
- New Caledonia
- Tahiti

Note: New Caledonia and Tahiti are not members of the International Olympic Committee and thus not eligible to qualify for the Olympic Football Tournament.

== Venues ==
Host city and venues of the 2023 OFC Men's Olympic Qualifying Tournament
- Auckland
- 1 Go Media Stadium
- 2 The Trusts Arena; Douglas Track and Field
- 3 North Harbour Stadium

Group A played all their matches at Mount Smart Stadium, known commercially as "Go Media Stadium," while Group B played all their matches at The Trusts Arena. Mount Smart Stadium also hosted both semi-final matches, while the final was contested at North Harbour Stadium.

New Zealand
Auckland
Go Media Stadium
Capacity: 30,000
The Trusts Arena	North Harbour Stadium
Capacity: 4,901	Capacity: 25,000

== Group stage ==
Eight teams entered the competition and were drawn into 2 groups on 15 June.

All times are local, NZST (UTC+12).

=== Group A ===
Pos	Team	Pld	W	D	L	GF	GA	GD	Pts	Qualification
1	New Zealand (H)	2	2	0	0	6	1	+5	6	Advance to knockout stage
2	Fiji	2	1	0	1	3	3	0	3	Advance to knockout stage
3	Papua New Guinea (Note: Papua New Guinea were unable to travel to New Zealand prior to their scheduled match on 27 August. The matter was resolved by awarding New Zealand with a 3–0 win.)	2	0	0	2	0	5	−5	0	
4	American Samoa (Note: American Samoa withdrew from the tournament on 1 August 2023.)	0	0	0	0	0	0	0	0	Withdrew

Source: OFC
(H) Hosts
Notes:
27 August 2023
15:00

New Zealand	3–0 Awarded	Papua New Guinea
	Report

Go Media Stadium, Auckland
Referee: Norbert Hauata (Tahiti)

30 August 2023
15:00

New Zealand	3–1	Fiji
Toomey 19'; Ott 21'; Randall 25'	Report	Yada 50'

Go Media Stadium, Auckland
Attendance: 531
Referee: Ben Aukwai (Solomon Islands)

2 September 2023
15:00

Papua New Guinea	0–2	Fiji
	Report	Dogalau 5'; Yada 66'

Go Media Stadium, Auckland
Attendance: 489
Referee: Norbert Hauata (Tahiti)

=== Group B ===
Pos	Team	Pld	W	D	L	GF	GA	GD	Pts	Qualification
1	Solomon Islands	3	3	0	0	11	1	+10	9	Advance to knockout stage
2	Vanuatu	3	2	0	1	7	4	+3	6	Advance to knockout stage
3	Samoa	3	1	0	2	4	6	−2	3	
4	Tonga	3	0	0	3	1	12	−11	0	

Source: OFC
28 August 2023
12:00

Samoa	3–0	Tonga
Cahill 54'; Siamoa 55', 84'	Report

The Trusts Arena, Auckland
Attendance: 100
Referee: Mederic Lacour (New Caledonia)
28 August 2023
15:00

Solomon Islands	3–0	Vanuatu
Wae 30' (pen.), 90+6' (pen.); Ohasio 88'	Report

The Trusts Arena, Auckland
Attendance: 90
Referee: CK Kawana-Waugh (New Zealand)

31 August 2023
12:00

Tonga	0–4	Vanuatu
	Report	King 5', 82'; Chichirua 24'; Tabe 69'

The Trusts Arena, Auckland
Attendance: 100
Referee: Veer Singh (Fiji)
31 August 2023
15:00

Solomon Islands	3–0	Samoa
Rocky 39'; Wae 60'; Fox 63'	Report

The Trusts Arena, Auckland
Attendance: 100
Referee: Alex King (Australia)

3 September 2023
12:00

Vanuatu	3–1	Samoa
Tasarur 20'; Moses 30' (pen.), 38'	Report	Gobbi 16'

The Trusts Arena, Auckland
Attendance: 100
Referee: Matthew Conger (New Zealand)
3 September 2023
15:00

Tonga	1–5	Solomon Islands
Tuamoheloa 74'	Report	Rocky 16'; Saeni 45'; Ohasio 47'; Irodao 63'; Toitani 77'

The Trusts Arena, Auckland
Attendance: 300
Referee: David Yareboinen (Papua New Guinea)

== Knockout stage ==
Semi-finals
6 September – Auckland
New Zealand	8
Vanuatu	0
6 September – Auckland
Solomon Islands	0
Fiji	3

Final
9 September – Auckland
New Zealand	9
Fiji	0

=== Semi-finals ===
6 September 2023
15:00

New Zealand	8–0	Vanuatu
Randall 3', 12'; van Hattum 10', 39'; Ott 17' (pen.); Verney 43'; Raj 55', 72'	Report

Go Media Stadium, Auckland
Attendance: 188
Referee: Mederic Lacour (New Caledonia)

6 September 2023
19:00

Solomon Islands	0–3	Fiji
	Report	Dogalau 25', 70'; McMullen 88'

Go Media Stadium, Auckland
Attendance: 1,145
Referee: Alex King (Australia)

=== Final ===
The winner qualified for the 2024 Summer Olympics.

9 September 2023
19:00

New Zealand	9–0	Fiji
Bidois 3' (pen.), 6', 19', 45+1', 63'; Randall 33' (pen.); Gillion 52'; Turagalailai 78' (o.g.); Kelly 82'	Report

North Harbour Stadium, Auckland
Attendance: 1,284
Referee: Norbert Hauata (Tahiti)

== Qualified team for the 2024 Summer Olympics ==
The following team from OFC qualified for the 2024 Summer Olympic men's football tournament in France.

Team	Qualified on	Previous appearances in the Summer Olympics
New Zealand	9 September 2023	3 (2008, 2012, 2020)

== Goalscorers ==
There were 49 goals scored in 11 matches, for an average of 4.45 goals per match.

5 goals

- (New Zealand) Riley Bidois

4 goals

- (New Zealand) Jesse Randall

3 goals

- (Fiji) Etonia Dogalau
- (Solomon Islands) Javin Wae

2 goals

- (Fiji) Aporosa Yada
- (New Zealand) George Ott
- (New Zealand) Aaryan Raj
- (New Zealand) Oskar van Hattum
- (Samoa) Greg Siamoa
- (Solomon Islands) Calvin Ohasio
- (Solomon Islands) Junior Rocky
- (Vanuatu) Nicolas King
- (Vanuatu) Joe Moses

1 goal

- (Fiji) Brendan McMullen
- (New Zealand) William Gillion
- (New Zealand) Keegan Kelly
- (New Zealand) Luis Toomey
- (New Zealand) Ryan Verney
- (Samoa) Kyah Cahill
- (Samoa) Juan Gobbi
- (Solomon Islands) Ben Fox
- (Solomon Islands) Hudyn Irodao
- (Solomon Islands) Dalton Saeni
- (Solomon Islands) Wesley Toitani
- (Tonga) David-John Tuamoheloa
- (Vanuatu) George Chichirua
- (Vanuatu) Giniho Tabe
- (Vanuatu) Ronn Tasarur

1 own goal

- (Fiji) Inoke Turagalailai (against New Zealand)
