= 2019 OFC Men's Olympic Qualifying Tournament =

Tournament details
- Host country: Fiji
- Dates: 21 September – 5 October 2019
- Teams: 8 (from 1 confederation)
- Venue: 2 (in 2 host cities)

Final positions
- Champions: New Zealand (4th title)
- Runners-up: Solomon Islands
- Third place: Vanuatu
- Fourth place: Fiji

Tournament statistics
- Matches played: 16
- Goals scored: 84 (5.25 per match)
- Attendance: 3,240 (203 per match)
- Top scorer: (New Zealand) Myer Bevan (12 goals)

The 2019 OFC Men's Olympic Qualifying Tournament (also called the 2019 OFC U-23 Championship) was the eighth edition of the OFC Men's Olympic Qualifying Tournament, the quadrennial international age-restricted football championship organised by the Oceania Football Confederation (OFC) for the men's under-23 national teams of Oceania.

In November 2018, it was announced that Fiji would host the competition. The tournament was held from 21 September to 5 October 2019.

The winner qualified as the OFC representative at the 2020 Summer Olympics men's football tournament in Japan.

New Zealand won the title after defeating Solomon Islands in the final. Vanuatu finished third, and defending champions Fiji finished fourth.

== Teams ==
Eight of the 11 FIFA-affiliated national teams from the OFC entered the tournament.

Team	Appearance	Previous best performance
American Samoa	3rd	Group stage (2004, 2012)
Fiji (hosts)	8th	Champions (2015)
New Zealand	9th	Champions (1999, 2008, 2012)
Papua New Guinea	7th	Third place (2015)
Samoa	3rd	Group stage (1999, 2004)
Solomon Islands	7th	Runners-up (1999, 2008)
Tonga	4th	Group stage (1999, 2004, 2012)
Vanuatu	7th	Runners-up (2015)

Did not enter

- Cook Islands
- New Caledonia
- Tahiti

Note: New Caledonia and Tahiti are not members of the International Olympic Committee and thus not eligible to qualify for the Olympic Football Tournament.

== Venues ==
Suva	Lautoka
ANZ National Stadium	Churchill Park
Capacity: 15,000	Capacity: 10,000

== Squads ==
Players born on or after 1 January 1997 were eligible to compete in the tournament.

== Draw ==
The draw of the tournament was held on 6 May 2019 at the OFC Academy in Auckland, New Zealand. The eight teams were drawn into two groups of four teams. The top two ranked teams, New Zealand and Fiji, were assigned to group positions A1 and B1 respectively, and the next two ranked teams, Vanuatu and Solomon Islands, were drawn into position 2 of Group A or B, while the remaining teams were drawn into position 3 or 4 of Group A or B.

== Group stage ==
The top two teams of each group advanced to the semi-finals.

All times are local, FJT (UTC+12).

=== Group A ===
Pos	Team	Pld	W	D	L	GF	GA	GD	Pts	Qualification
1	New Zealand	3	3	0	0	22	3	+19	9	Knockout stage
2	Solomon Islands	3	2	0	1	13	4	+9	6	Knockout stage
3	Samoa	3	1	0	2	6	11	−5	3	
4	American Samoa	3	0	0	3	0	23	−23	0	

Source: OFC
21 September 2019
12:00

Solomon Islands	6–0	American Samoa
Waita 3', 55'; Kakasi 10'; Taroga 33'; Mara 41', 47'	Report

ANZ National Stadium, Suva
Attendance: 150
Referee: Mederic Lacour (New Caledonia)
21 September 2019
15:00

Samoa	1–6	New Zealand
Tumua Leo 41'	Report	Waine 10', 52', 80', 84' (pen.); Rogerson 11'; Bevan 39'

ANZ National Stadium, Suva
Attendance: 240
Referee: Norbert Hauata (Tahiti)

24 September 2019
12:00

Samoa	0–5	Solomon Islands
	Report	Kakasi 16'; Waita 29', 35'; Mara 68'; Taroga 90+2'

ANZ National Stadium, Suva
Attendance: 150
Referee: Joel Hopken (Vanuatu)
24 September 2019
15:00

New Zealand	12–0	American Samoa
Lewis 4', 34'; Rogerson 15'; Whyte 19'; Bevan 51', 75', 78', 83', 89'; Waine 54', 59'; De Jong 56'	Report

ANZ National Stadium, Suva
Attendance: 200
Referee: David Yareboinen (Papua New Guinea)

27 September 2019
15:00

American Samoa	0–5	Samoa
	Report	Tumua Leo 26', 88'; Savelio 29'; Bourne 39'; Malo 65'

ANZ National Stadium, Suva
Attendance: 100
Referee: David Yareboinen (Papua New Guinea)
27 September 2019
18:00

New Zealand	4–2	Solomon Islands
Lewis 37'; Bevan 39', 90+1'; Billingsley 53'	Report	Taroga 1'; Maeobia 78'

ANZ National Stadium, Suva
Attendance: 600
Referee: Mederic Lacour (New Caledonia)

=== Group B ===
Pos	Team	Pld	W	D	L	GF	GA	GD	Pts	Qualification
1	Vanuatu	3	3	0	0	12	1	+11	9	Knockout stage
2	Fiji (H)	3	2	0	1	7	3	+4	6	Knockout stage
3	Papua New Guinea	3	1	0	2	8	7	+1	3	
4	Tonga	3	0	0	3	2	18	−16	0	

Source: OFC
(H) Hosts
22 September 2019
12:00

Vanuatu	3–1	Papua New Guinea
Soromon 3', 21' (pen.); Wilkins 25'	Report	Togubai 56' (pen.)

Churchill Park, Lautoka
Attendance: 150
Referee: Matthew Conger (New Zealand)
22 September 2019
15:00

Tonga	1–4	Fiji
Polovili 90'	Report	Joseph 54' (pen.), 66'; Baledrokadroka 62'; Hughes 90'

Churchill Park, Lautoka
Attendance: 350
Referee: Sivakorn Pu-Udom (Thailand)

25 September 2019
12:00

Tonga	0–8	Vanuatu
	Report	Kalo 28', 29', 50'; Spokeyjack 31'; Ollie 45+2'; Tasip 48'; Kalopong 54'; Soromon 81'

Churchill Park, Lautoka
Attendance: 100
Referee: George Time (Solomon Islands)
25 September 2019
15:00

Fiji	3–1	Papua New Guinea
Baledrokadroka 42'; Joseph 50'; Vodowaqa 87'	Report	Simongi 66'

Churchill Park, Lautoka
Attendance: 250
Referee: Nick Waldron (New Zealand)

28 September 2019
12:00

Papua New Guinea	6–1	Tonga
Kepo 11', 73'; Togubai 45+1', 49' (pen.); Purari 55'; Malafu 72' (o.g.)	Report	Polovili 15'

Churchill Park, Lautoka
Attendance: 100
Referee: Campbell-Kirk Kawana-Waugh (New Zealand)
28 September 2019
15:00

Fiji	0–1	Vanuatu
	Report	Aru 45'

Churchill Park, Lautoka
Attendance: 250
Referee: Matthew Conger (New Zealand)

== Knockout stage ==
=== Bracket ===
Semi-finals
2 October – Lautoka
New Zealand	6
Fiji	1
2 October – Lautoka
Vanuatu	0
Solomon Islands	1

Final
5 October – Lautoka
New Zealand	5
Solomon Islands	0
Third place match
5 October – Lautoka
Fiji	0
Vanuatu	1

=== Semi-finals ===
2 October 2019
12:00

New Zealand	6–1	Fiji
Wara 13' (o.g.); Waine 23'; Rogerson 28'; Bevan 44', 90+5'; Elliot 78'	Report	Shah 73'

Churchill Park, Lautoka
Attendance: 150
Referee: David Yareboinen (Papua New Guinea)

2 October 2019
15:30

Vanuatu	0–1	Solomon Islands
	Report	Waita 37'

Churchill Park, Lautoka
Attendance: 150
Referee: Matthew Conger (New Zealand)

=== Third place match ===
5 October 2019
12:00

Fiji	0–1	Vanuatu
	Report	Soromon 75'

Churchill Park, Lautoka
Attendance: 100
Referee: Mederic Lacour (New Caledonia)

=== Final ===
Winner qualifies for 2020 Summer Olympics.

5 October 2019
15:00

New Zealand	5–0	Solomon Islands
Rogerson 7'; Bevan 27', 67'; Waine 30'; Jones 90'	Report

Churchill Park, Lautoka
Attendance: 200
Referee: Norbert Hauata (Tahiti)

== Qualified team for the Summer Olympics ==
The following team from the OFC qualified for the 2020 Summer Olympic men's football tournament.

Team	Qualified on	Previous appearances in the Summer Olympics^{1}
New Zealand	5 October 2019	2 (2008, 2012)

^{1} Bold indicates champions for that year. Italic indicates hosts for that year.

== Goalscorers ==
12 goals

- (New Zealand) Myer Bevan

8 goals

- (New Zealand) Ben Waine

5 goals

- (Solomon Islands) Augustine Waita

4 goals

- (New Zealand) Logan Rogerson
- (Vanuatu) Azariah Soromon

3 goals

- (Fiji) Patrick Joseph
- (New Zealand) Clayton Lewis
- (Papua New Guinea) Gregory Togubai
- (Samoa) Michael Tumua Leo
- (Solomon Islands) Adrian Mara
- (Solomon Islands) Patrick Taroga
- (Vanuatu) Bong Kalo

2 goals

- (Fiji) Savenaca Baledrokadroka
- (Papua New Guinea) Freddy Kepo
- (Solomon Islands) Darold Kakasi
- (Tonga) Hemaloto Polovili

1 goal

- (Fiji) Bruce Hughes
- (Fiji) Mohammed Shah
- (Fiji) Tito Vodowaqa
- (New Zealand) Noah Billingsley
- (New Zealand) Dylan de Jong
- (New Zealand) Callan Elliot
- (New Zealand) Billy Jones
- (New Zealand) Ollie Whyte
- (Papua New Guinea) Bernard Purari
- (Papua New Guinea) Emmanuel Simongi
- (Samoa) Ronnie Bourne
- (Samoa) Samuelu Malo
- (Samoa) Osa Savelio
- (Solomon Islands) Tuita Maeobia
- (Vanuatu) Claude Aru
- (Vanuatu) Jesse Kalopong
- (Vanuatu) Bethuel Ollie
- (Vanuatu) Johnathan Spokeyjack
- (Vanuatu) Jordy Tasip
- (Vanuatu) Ronaldo Wilkins

Own goal

- (Tonga) Mahe Malafu (playing against Papua New Guinea)
- (Fiji) Scott Wara (playing against New Zealand)
