= Tonga national under-23 football team =

National association football team

Tonga U23
- Association: Tonga Football Association
- Confederation: OFC (Oceania)
- Head coach: Timote Moleni
- FIFA code: TGA
First colours	Second colours

First international
- Solomon Islands 7–0 Tonga (Auckland, New Zealand; 11 December 1999)

Biggest win
- Tonga 3–0 American Samoa (Auckland, New Zealand; 14 January 2004)

Biggest defeat
- New Zealand 10–0 Tonga (Taupō, New Zealand; 21 March 2012)

OFC U23 Championship
- Appearances: 5 (First in 1999)
- Best result: Group Stage

The Tonga national under-23 football team, also known as Tonga U23, represents Tonga internationally at U23 tournaments. The team is considered to be the feeder team for the Tonga national football team and is controlled by the Tonga Football Association.

== History ==
Tonga U23 made three appearances so far at the OFC U23 Championship. They never reached further than the Group Stage. In 2019 they were defeated 4-1 by Fiji in their opening pool match before losing 8-0 to Vanuatu.

In 2012 Timote Moleni was appointed as team coach.

== Competitive record ==
=== OFC Men's Olympic Qualifying Tournament ===
The OFC Men's Olympic Qualifying Tournament is a tournament held once every four years to decide the only qualification spot for Oceania Football Confederation (OFC) and representatives at the Olympic Games.

OFC Men's Olympic Qualifying Tournament record
Year	Round	Pld	W	D	L	GF	GA
(Australia) (New Zealand) 1988	Did not enter						
(Fiji) 1991	Did not enter						
(Australia) 1996	Did not enter						
(New Zealand) 1999	Group stage	3	0	0	3	1	20
(Australia) (New Zealand) 2004	Group stage	4	2	0	2	4	8
(Fiji) 2008	Did not enter						
(New Zealand) 2012	Group stage	2	0	0	2	0	13
(Papua New Guinea) 2015	Did not enter						
(Fiji) 2019	Group stage	3	0	0	3	2	18
(New Zealand) 2023	Group stage	3	0	0	3	1	12
Total	Group stage	15	2	0	13	8	71

== Current squad ==
The following players were called to the squad for the 2019 OFC Men's Olympic Qualifying Tournament from 21 September - 5 October 2019.
Caps and goals updated as of 28 September 2019 after the match against Papua New Guinea.

No.	Pos.	Player	Date of birth (age)	Caps	Goals	Club
1	GK	Mahe Malafu	24 February 1998 (age 28)	3	0	(Tonga Football Association) Veitongo
20	GK	Polutele Tavite	28 August 1999 (age 27)	1	0	(Tonga Football Association) Longoteme
2	DF	Tevita Vakatapu	2 December 1999 (age 26)	3	0	(Tonga Football Association) Haʻamoko United Youth
3	DF	Nicolas Vea	31 October 2002 (age 24)	3	0	(Tonga Football Association) Navutoka
4	DF	Kelepi Mataele	16 September 1999 (age 27)	3	0	(Tonga Football Association)
5	DF	Opesi Tu'ifangaloka	21 July 1999 (age 27)	3	0	(Tonga Football Association) Veitongo
13	DF	Amanaki Laui	11 June 1998 (age 28)	2	0	(Tonga Football Association) Longoteme
14	DF	Sitaleki Fisi	11 February 2000 (age 26)	2	0	(Tonga Football Association) Lotohaʻapai United
15	DF	Pita Huni	25 February 2001 (age 25)	2	0	(Tonga Football Association) Lotohaʻapai United
17	DF	Valeiaatu Fili	14 January 1999 (age 27)	3	0	(Tonga Football Association) Longoteme
6	MF	William Senituli	24 February 2002 (age 24)	1	0	(Tonga Football Association)
7	MF	Sione Tu'ifangaloka	24 April 1999 (age 27)	3	0	(Tonga Football Association) Veitongo
8	MF	Soakai Vea	19 July 1998 (age 28)	3	0	(Tonga Football Association) Marist
9	MF	Rick Taula	12 February 2000 (age 26)	2	0	(Tonga Football Association) Longoteme
12	MF	Mohammad Rajani	16 April 1999 (age 27)	3	0	(Football Australia) GHFA Spirit
16	MF	Pesamino Tomasi	8 March 2001 (age 25)	1	0	(Tonga Football Association)
	MF	Aisea Muli	17 October 1998 (age 28)	0	0	(Tonga Football Association) Longoteme
10	FW	Laulea Taufa	14 July 1999 (age 27)	1	0	(Tonga Football Association)
11	FW	Hemaloto Polovili	26 July 1997 (age 29)	4	2	(Tonga Football Association) Veitongo
	FW	Tuloi Maamaloa	28 December 2000 (age 25)	0	0	(Tonga Football Association) Navutoka

== 2012 squad ==
Caps and goals as of 16 March 2012.

No.	Pos.	Player	Date of birth (age)	Caps	Goals	Club
1	GK	Sione Faupula	7 January 1991 (aged 21)	2	0	(Tonga Football Association) Lotoha'apai United
18	GK	Vei Taufa'ao	27 May 1989 (aged 22)	0	0	Unattached
4	DF	Christian Likio	28 March 1990 (aged 21)	2	0	(Tonga Football Association) Unattached
9	DF	Sione Langi	7 June 1992 (aged 19)	0	0	Unattached
10	DF	Matana Paongo	9 March 1989 (aged 23)	1	0	(Tonga Football Association) Lotoha'apai United
13	DF	Samisoni Mafi	20 August 1990 (aged 21)	2	0	(Tonga Football Association) Lotoha'apai United
14	DF	Sevedale Latu	9 November 1990 (aged 21)	1	0	Unattached
17	DF	Joseph Kapani	9 June 1989 (aged 22)	1	0	Unattached
20	DF	Ilaisa Lotaki	12 January 1990 (aged 22)	1	0	Unattached
2	MF	Fineasi Palei	20 May 1989 (aged 22)	2	0	(Tonga Football Association) Lotoha'apai United
5	MF	Oliveti Vai	10 May 1994 (aged 17)	2	0	(Tonga Football Association) Lotoha'apai United
7	MF	Siosifa Moimoi	30 September 1994 (aged 17)	2	0	(Tonga Football Association) Kolofo’ou FC
8	MF	Timote Maamaaloa	17 June 1989 (aged 22)	2	0	(Tonga Football Association) Lotoha'apai United
16	MF	Misinale Lutu	12 January 1994 (aged 18)	1	0	Unattached
19	MF	Steven Likio	3 June 1991 (aged 20)	0	0	Unattached
21	FW	Vaha Maamaaloa	17 June 1989 (aged 22)	1	0	Unattached
6	FW	Malakai Savieti	11 November 1989 (aged 22)	2	0	Unattached
11	FW	Kinitoni Falatau	14 November 1994 (aged 17)	2	0	(Tonga Football Association) Houmakelikao
12	FW	Siosaia Latupauu	13 November 1993 (aged 18)	2	0	Unattached
15	FW	Hemaloto Polovili	26 July 1997 (aged 14)	1	0	(Tonga Football Association) Lotoha'apai United
22	FW	Valu Kolofale	3 August 1993 (aged 18)	0	0	(Tonga Football Association) Lotoha'apai United

== List of coaches ==
- (Tonga) Timote Moleni (2012-2019)

== See also ==
- Tonga national football team
- Tonga national under-20 football team
- OFC Men's Olympic Qualifying Tournament
