= OFC Men's Olympic Qualifying Tournament =

- Organiser(s): OFC
- Founded: 1991
- Region: Oceania
- Teams: 8
- Qualifier for: Summer Olympics
- Current champions: New Zealand (5th title)
- Most championships: New Zealand (5 titles)
- 2023 OFC Men's Olympic Qualifying Tournament

The OFC Olympic Qualifying Tournament is a tournament held once in four years' time to decide the only qualification spot for Oceania Football Confederation (OFC) and representatives at the Olympic Games. Unlike other continent, winner of OFC Olympic Qualifying Tournament does not giving away any trophy.

== Eligible teams ==
Thirteen nations are eligible to participate in the tournament, these are:

- American Samoa
- Cook Islands
- Fiji
- Kiribati (not a member of FIFA)
- New Zealand
- Papua New Guinea
- Samoa
- Solomon Islands
- Tonga
- Tuvalu (not a member of FIFA)
- Vanuatu

== Previous tournaments ==
| Ed. | Year | Host | Final Standings | | | | Teams |
| Ed. | Year | Host | Champion | Runner-up | Third place | Fourth place | Teams |
as Senior teams
| 1 | 1988 | Australia & New Zealand | Australia | Israel | New Zealand | Chinese Taipei | 5 |
as Olympic / U23s teams
| 2 | 1991 | Fiji | Australia | New Zealand | Fiji | Papua New Guinea | 4 |
| 3 | 1996 | Australia | Australia | New Zealand | Fiji | Solomon Islands | 5 |
| 4 | 1999 | New Zealand | New Zealand | Solomon Islands | Fiji | Papua New Guinea | 7 |
| 5 | 2004 | Australia & New Zealand | Australia | New Zealand | — (Note: There was no dispute for third place.) | | 10 |
| 6 | 2008 | Fiji | New Zealand | Solomon Islands | Fiji | Papua New Guinea | 6 |
| 7 | 2012 | New Zealand | New Zealand | Fiji | Vanuatu | Papua New Guinea | 7 |
| 8 | 2015 (Note: The 2015 Olympic qualifying tournament was held as part of the men's football tournament at the 2015 Pacific Games.) | Papua New Guinea | Fiji | Vanuatu | — | | 8 |
| 9 | 2019 | Fiji | New Zealand | Solomon Islands | Vanuatu | Fiji | 8 |
| 10 | 2023 | New Zealand | New Zealand | Fiji | — | | 7 |

=== Performance by country ===
| Team | Titles | Titles years | Runn. | Runners-up years |
|---|---|---|---|---|
| New Zealand | 5 | 1999, 2008, 2012, 2019, 2023 | 3 | 1991, 1996, 2004 |
| Australia | 4 | 1988, 1991, 1996, 2004 | — | — |
| Fiji | 1 | 2015 | 2 | 2012, 2023 |
| Solomon Islands | — | — | 3 | 1999, 2008, 2019 |
| Israel | — | — | 1 | 1988 |
| Vanuatu | — | — | 1 | 2015 |
