= New Zealand men's national under-23 football team =

New Zealand Olympic
- Nickname: OlyWhites
- Association: New Zealand Football
- Confederation: OFC (Oceania)
- Head coach: Darren Bazeley
- Captain: Matthew Garbett
- Most caps: Ian Hogg (16)
- Top scorer: Logan Rogerson (14)
- FIFA code: NZL
First colours	Second colours

First international
- Australia 2–0 New Zealand (Melbourne, Australia; 22 May 1991)

Biggest win
- Tonga 0–13 New Zealand (Apia, Samoa; 8 July 2019) (Note: This victory was played against the senior team of Tonga.); New Zealand 12–0 American Samoa (Suva, Fiji; 24 September 2019)

Biggest defeat
- Australia 5–0 New Zealand (Adelaide, Australia; 21 January 1996); New Zealand 0–5 Brazil (Shenyang, China; 10 August 2008)

Summer Olympic Games
- Appearances: 4 (first in 2008)
- Best result: Quarter-finals (2020)

OFC Men's Olympic Qualifying Tournament
- Appearances: 10 (first in 1988)
- Best result: Champions (1999, 2008, 2012, 2019, 2023)

Pacific Games
- Appearances: 2 (first in 2015)
- Best result: Champions (2019)

The New Zealand national under-23 football team, informally known as the "OlyWhites", represents New Zealand Football and New Zealand in international Under-23 football events, such as the Summer Olympics.

The OlyWhites qualified for the 2008 Summer Olympics in Beijing after winning the OFC Preliminary Competition in Fiji. Thus, Beijing saw the first Olympic appearance for a New Zealand men's football team.

== Results and fixtures ==
Legend

Win Draw Lose Fixture

== Players ==
=== Current squad ===
The following players were called up for the 2024 Olympics between 24 July and 10 August 2024.
Caps and goals updated as of 27 July 2024 after the game against the United States.

No.	Pos.	Player	Date of birth (age)	Caps	Goals	Club
1	GK	Alex Paulsen	4 July 2002 (age 24)	6	0	(The Football Association) AFC Bournemouth
12	GK	Kees Sims	27 March 2003 (age 23)	4	0	(Swedish Football Association) GAIS
2	DF	Michael Boxall*	18 August 1988 (age 38)	14	1	(United States Soccer Federation) Minnesota United
3	DF	Sam Sutton	10 December 2001 (age 24)	6	1	(New Zealand Football) Wellington Phoenix
4	DF	Tyler Bindon	27 January 2005 (age 21)	2	0	(The Football Association) Reading
5	DF	Finn Surman	23 September 2003 (age 23)	6	0	(United States Soccer Federation) Portland Timbers FC
13	DF	Lukas Kelly-Heald	18 March 2005 (age 21)	5	0	(New Zealand Football) Wellington Phoenix
15	DF	Matthew Sheridan	9 May 2004 (age 22)	3	0	(New Zealand Football) Wellington Phoenix
20	DF	Isaac Hughes	25 March 2004 (age 22)	2	0	(New Zealand Football) Wellington Phoenix
6	MF	Joe Bell*	27 April 1999 (age 27)	8	0	(Norwegian Football Federation) Viking
7	MF	Matthew Garbett (captain)	13 April 2002 (age 24)	4	1	(Royal Dutch Football Association) NAC Breda
8	MF	Ben Old	13 August 2002 (age 24)	2	1	(French Football Federation) Saint-Étienne
10	MF	Sarpreet Singh*	20 February 1999 (age 27)	2	0	Unattached
16	MF	Fin Conchie	10 August 2003 (age 23)	2	0	(New Zealand Football) Wellington Phoenix
17	MF	Lachlan Bayliss	24 July 2002 (age 24)	2	0	(Football Australia) Newcastle Jets
9	FW	Ben Waine	11 June 2001 (age 25)	12	9	(The Football Association) Plymouth Argyle
11	FW	Jesse Randall	19 August 2002 (age 24)	6	5	(New Zealand Football) Auckland FC
14	FW	Jay Herdman	14 August 2004 (age 22)	4	1	(Football Association of Indonesia) Bali United
18	FW	Oskar van Hattum	14 April 2002 (age 24)	7	2	(Football Association of Ireland) Sligo Rovers
19	FW	Liam Gillion	17 October 2002 (age 24)	4	1	(New Zealand Football) Auckland FC

* Overage player.

=== Recent call-ups ===
The following players have been called up within the last 12 months and remain eligible for selection.

Pos.	Player	Date of birth (age)	Caps	Goals	Club	Latest call-up
GK	Henry Gray	29 March 2005 (age 21)	0	0	(England) Ipswich Town U21	2024 Summer Olympics^{ALT}
GK	Scott Morris	24 February 2001 (age 25)	1	0	(England) Stoke City U23	v. Fiji, 9 September 2023
GK	Alby Kelly-Heald	18 March 2005 (age 21)	0	0	(New Zealand) Wellington Phoenix	v. Fiji, 9 September 2023
GK	Joe Knowles	2 November 2004 (age 22)	0	0	(New Zealand) Eastern Suburbs	v. Fiji, 9 September 2023
DF	Zac Zoricich	28 October 2002 (age 24)	5	0	(Australia) Sydney Olympic	v. Fiji, 9 September 2023
DF	Nathan Lobo	16 December 2002 (age 23)	4	0	(New Zealand) Auckland City	v. Fiji, 9 September 2023
DF	Aaryan Raj	4 May 2003 (age 23)	3	2	(New Zealand) Eastern Suburbs	v. Fiji, 9 September 2023
MF	Luis Toomey	1 July 2001 (age 25)	2	1	(New Zealand) Auckland FC	2024 Summer Olympics^{ALT}
MF	Campbell Strong	10 May 2002 (age 24)	4	0	(New Zealand) Eastern Suburbs	v. Fiji, 9 September 2023
MF	Willem Ebbinge	6 January 2001 (age 25)	3	0	(United States) Harvard Crimson	v. Fiji, 9 September 2023
MF	Dan McKay	27 November 2003 (age 22)	3	0	(Republic of Ireland) Cobh Ramblers	v. Fiji, 9 September 2023
MF	Ryan Verney	16 February 2002 (age 24)	2	1	(New Zealand) Eastern Suburbs	v. Fiji, 9 September 2023
MF	Oscar Browne	26 February 2001 (age 25)	1	0	(New Zealand) Western Springs	v. Fiji, 9 September 2023
MF	Matthew Ellis	27 February 2001 (age 25)	1	0	(New Zealand) Western Springs	v. Fiji, 9 September 2023
MF	Aiden Carey	10 July 2001 (age 25)	0	0	(New Zealand) Western Springs	v. Fiji, 9 September 2023
MF	Theo Ettema	14 July 2004 (age 22)	0	0	(New Zealand) Wellington Olympic	v. Fiji, 9 September 2023
FW	Riley Bidois	12 February 2002 (age 24)	3	6	(United States) Loudoun United	2024 Summer Olympics^{INJ}
FW	Joe Lee	12 June 2002 (age 24)	5	0	(New Zealand) Auckland City	v. Fiji, 9 September 2023
FW	Keegan Kelly	5 June 2005 (age 21)	3	1	(United States) Flatirons Rush	v. Fiji, 9 September 2023
FW	George Ott	22 October 2001 (age 25)	2	2	(Australia) Avondale	v. Fiji, 9 September 2023
FW	Adama Coulibaly	10 January 2005 (age 21)	0	0	(New Zealand) Auckland FC	v. Fiji, 9 September 2023
Notes: ^{ALT} Alternate.; ^{INJ} Withdrew due to injury.

=== Overage players in Olympic Games ===
Tournament	Player 1	Player 2	Player 3
2008	Ryan Nelsen (DF)	Simon Elliott (MF)	Chris Killen (FW)
2012	Ryan Nelsen (DF)	Michael McGlinchey (MF)	Shane Smeltz (FW)
2020	Winston Reid (DF)	Michael Boxall (DF)	Chris Wood (FW)
2024	Michael Boxall (DF)	Joe Bell (MF)	Sarpreet Singh (MF)

== Competitive record ==
=== OFC Men's Olympic qualifying tournament ===
The New Zealand national under-23 football team has competed in the OFC Men's Olympic qualifying tournament since 1991. During the 1980s, the New Zealand national football team participated in Olympic qualification.

OFC Men's Olympic Qualifying Tournament record
Year	Round	Position	Pld	W	D	L	GF	GA
(Australia) (New Zealand) 1988	See New Zealand men's national football team							
(Fiji) 1991	Runners-up	2nd	6	3	1	2	12	6
(Australia) 1996	Runners-up	2nd	8	6	0	2	28	9
(New Zealand) 1999	Champions	1st	4	4	0	0	18	3
(Australia) (New Zealand) 2004	Runners-up	2nd	6	4	1	1	26	5
(Fiji) 2008	Champions	1st	5	5	0	0	19	3
(New Zealand) 2012	Champions	1st	4	4	0	0	15	2
(Papua New Guinea) 2015	Semi-finals	3rd	4	3	0	1	8	3
(Fiji) 2019	Champions	1st	5	5	0	0	33	4
(New Zealand) 2023	Champions	1st	4	4	0	0	23	1
(Papua New Guinea) 2027	To be determined							
Total	5 titles	9/9	46	38	2	6	173	35

=== Olympic Games ===
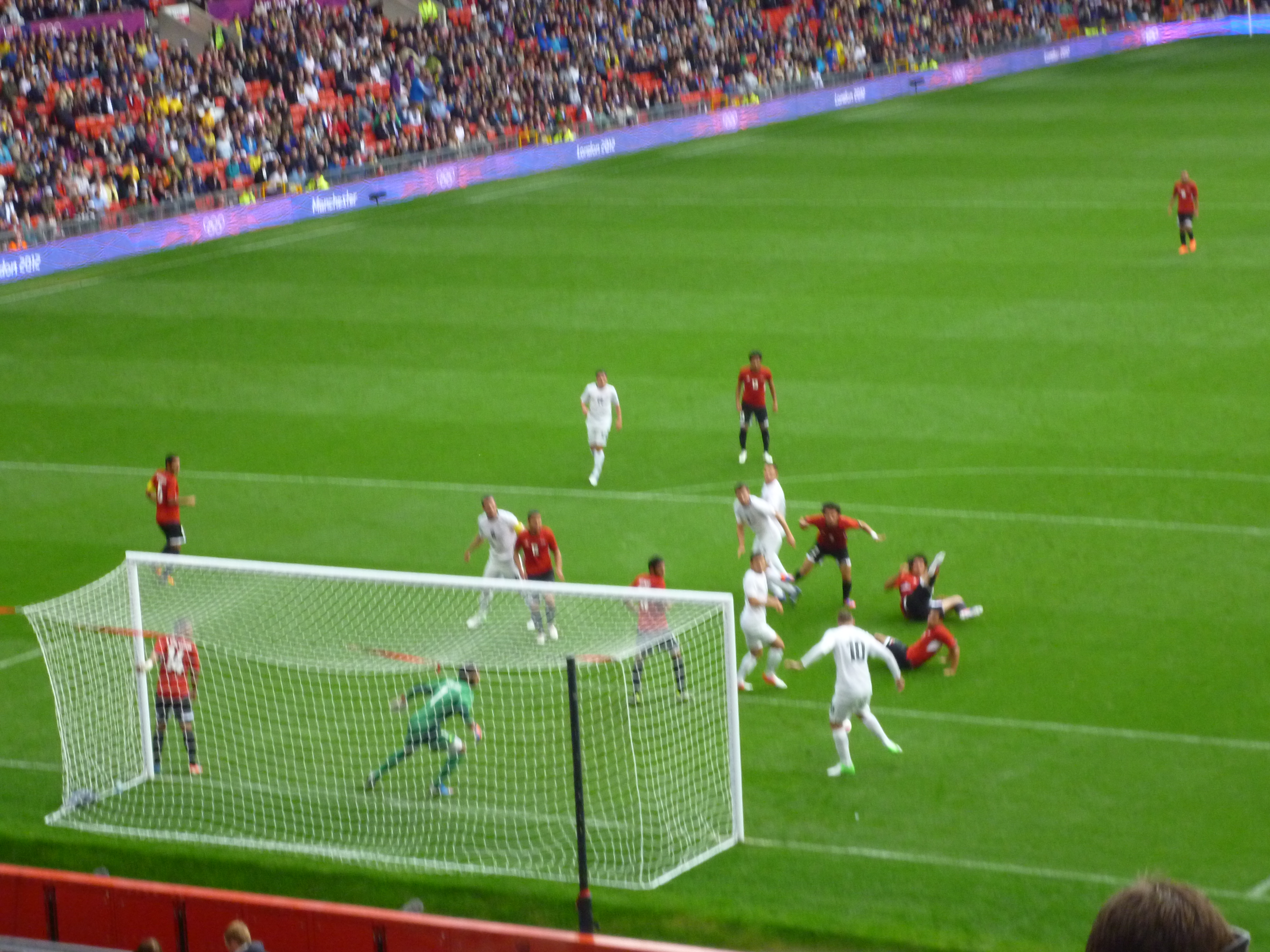
New Zealand's Chris Wood scores against Egypt at the 2012 Summer Olympics

Summer Olympics record
Year	Round	Position	Pld	W	D	L	GF	GA
1900–1988	See New Zealand men's national football team							
(Spain) 1992	Did not qualify							
(United States) 1996	Did not qualify							
(Australia) 2000	Did not qualify							
(Greece) 2004	Did not qualify							
(China) 2008	Group stage	14th	3	0	1	2	1	7
(United Kingdom) 2012	Group stage	16th	3	0	1	2	1	5
(Brazil) 2016	Disqualified							
(Japan) 2020	Quarter-finals	6th	4	1	2	1	3	3
(France) 2024	Group stage	11th	3	1	0	2	3	8
(United States) 2028	To be determined							
(Australia) 2032	To be determined							
Total	Quarter-finals	4/9	13	2	4	7	8	23

==== Beijing 2008 ====
7 August Group C	China	1–1	New Zealand	Shenyang, China
19:45 UTC+08:00	Dong 88'	Report	53' Brockie	Stadium: Shenyang Olympic Stadium; Attendance: 41,407; Referee: (Uruguay) Martín Vázquez

10 August Group C	New Zealand	0–5	Brazil	Shenyang, China
17:00 UTC+08:00		Report	3' Anderson; 33' Pato; 55', 61' (pen.) Ronaldinho; 90+3' Sóbis	Stadium: Shenyang Olympic Stadium; Attendance: 44,951; Referee: (France) Stéphane Lannoy

13 August Group C	New Zealand	0–1	Belgium	Shanghai, China
19:45 UTC+08:00		Report	35' Haroun	Stadium: Shanghai Stadium; Attendance: 45,202; Referee: (Chile) Pablo Pozo

==== London 2012 ====
26 July Group C	Belarus	1–0	New Zealand	Coventry, United Kingdom
19:45 UTC+01:00	Baha 45+1'	Report		Stadium: The City of Coventry Stadium; Attendance: 14,457; Referee: (The Gambia) Bakary Gassama

29 July Group C	Egypt	1–1	New Zealand	Manchester, United Kingdom
12:00 UTC+01:00	Salah 40'	Report	Wood 17'	Stadium: Old Trafford; Attendance: 50,050; Referee: (United Kingdom) Mark Clattenburg

1 August Group C	Brazil	3–0	New Zealand	Newcastle, United Kingdom
14:30 UTC+01:00	Danilo 23'; Leandro Damião 29'; Sandro 52'	Report		Stadium: St James' Park; Attendance: 25,201; Referee: (The Gambia) Bakary Gassama

==== Tokyo 2020 ====
22 July 2020 Summer Olympics GS Group B	New Zealand	1–0	South Korea	Kashima, Japan
17:00 UTC+9	Wood 70'	Report (FIFA); Report (SW)		Stadium: Kashima Stadium; Referee: Victor Gomes (South Africa)

25 July 2020 Summer Olympics GS Group B	New Zealand	2–3	Honduras	Kashima, Japan
17:00 UTC+9	Cacace 10'; Wood 49'	Report (FIFA); Report (SW)	Palma 45'; Obregón Jr. 78'; Rivas 87'	Stadium: Kashima Stadium; Referee: Orel Grinfeld (Israel)

28 July 2020 Summer Olympics GS Group B	Romania	0–0	New Zealand	Sapporo, Japan
17:30 UTC+9		Report (FIFA); Report (SW)		Stadium: Sapporo Dome

31 July 2020 Summer Olympics Quarter-finals	Japan	0–0 (a.e.t.) (4–2 p)	New Zealand	Kashima, Japan
18:00 UTC+9		Report (FIFA); Report (SW)		Stadium: Kashima Soccer Stadium; Referee: Ismail Elfath (USA)
	Penalties
	Ueda (penalty scored); Itakura (penalty scored); Nakayama (penalty scored); Yoshida (penalty scored)		(penalty scored) Wood; (penalty missed) Cacace; (penalty missed) Lewis; (penalty scored) McCowatt

== Historical results ==
=== Head-to-head record ===
As 30 July 2024

Team	Pld	W	D	L	GF	GA	GD	WPCT
American Samoa	2	2	0	0	23	0	+23	100.00
Australia (Note: Football Federation Australia were founder members of the Oceania Football Confederation (OFC) before joining the Asian Football Confederation in 2006.)	16	2	3	11	9	30	−21	12.50
Belarus	1	0	0	1	0	1	−1	0.00
Belgium	1	0	0	1	0	1	−1	0.00
Brazil	2	0	0	2	0	8	−8	0.00
Chile	2	1	0	1	2	2	0	50.00
China	3	2	1	0	5	2	+3	66.67
Cook Islands	2	2	0	0	17	0	+17	100.00
Egypt	1	0	1	0	1	1	0	0.00
France	1	0	0	1	0	3	−3	0.00
Fiji	10	8	1	1	34	7	+27	80.00
Guinea	1	1	0	0	2	1	+1	100.00
Honduras	1	0	0	1	2	3	−1	0.00
Indonesia	1	0	0	1	1	2	−1	0.00
Japan	4	0	2	2	1	9	−8	0.00
New Caledonia	4	2	2	0	11	2	+9	50.00
Papua New Guinea	6	6	0	0	19	4	+15	100.00
Romania	1	0	1	0	0	0	0	0.00
Samoa	1	1	0	0	6	1	+5	100.00
Saudi Arabia	1	0	0	1	0	3	−3	0.00
Solomon Islands	6	6	0	0	20	3	+17	100.00
South Africa	2	0	0	2	2	4	−2	0.00
South Korea	4	1	0	3	5	9	−4	25.00
Tonga	2	2	0	0	12	0	+12	100.00
United Arab Emirates	1	0	0	1	2	4	−2	0.00
United States	1	0	0	1	1	4	−3	0.00
Uzbekistan	1	0	0	1	1	3	−2	0.00
Vanuatu	8	7	0	1	35	8	+27	87.50
Total	86	43	11	32	211	115	+96	50.00

Source: 1992–2019, 2020–present

=== Senior teams ===
Team	Pld	W	D	L	GF	GA	GD	WPCT
New Caledonia	1	1	0	0	2	1	+1	100.00
Papua New Guinea	1	1	0	0	2	0	+2	100.00
Samoa	1	1	0	0	5	1	+4	100.00
Tonga	1	1	0	0	13	0	+13	100.00
Vanuatu	1	0	1	0	0	0	0	0.00
Total	5	4	1	0	22	2	+20	80.00

Source: 1992–2019

== See also ==
- Sport in New Zealand
  - Football in New Zealand
    - Women's football in New Zealand
- New Zealand national football team
- New Zealand men's national under-20 football team
- New Zealand men's national under-17 football team
- New Zealand women's national football team
