= Papua New Guinea national under-23 soccer team =

Papua New Guinea U23
- Nickname: Kapuls (Cuscus)
- Association: Papua New Guinea Football Association
- Confederation: OFC (Oceania)
- Head coach: (Australia) Warren Moon
First colours	Second colours

First international
- Australia 4–0 Papua New Guinea (Melbourne, Australia; May 19, 1991)

Biggest win
- Cook Islands 0–7 Papua New Guinea (Lautoka, Fiji; March 7, 2008)

Biggest defeat
- Australia 9–0 Papua New Guinea (Sydney, Australia; January 16, 2004)

OFC U23 Championship
- Appearances: 5 (First in 1991)
- Best result: Fourth place (1991, 1999, 2004, 2008)

The Papua New Guinea national under-23 soccer team, also known as PNG U23, represents Papua New Guinea at U23 tournaments. The team is considered to be the feeder team for the Papua New Guinea national soccer team.

== History ==
PNG U23 made five appearances so far at the OFC U23 Championship. Their best result was third place, achieved at the 2015 Pacific Games.

=== OFC ===
The OFC Men's Olympic Qualifying Tournament is a tournament held once every four years to decide the only qualification spot for Oceania Football Confederation (OFC) and representatives at the Olympic Games.

OFC Men's Olympic Qualifying Tournament
Year	Round	Pld	W	D	L	GF	GA	GD	Pts
(Fiji) 1991	Fourth place	6	0	1	5	4	19	-15	1
(Australia) 1996	Did not enter								
(New Zealand) 1999	Fourth place	4	1	0	3	3	11	-8	3
(Australia) 2004	Group Stage	4	0	1	3	7	21	-14	1
(Fiji) 2008	Fourth place	5	2	0	3	18	20	-2	6
(New Zealand) 2012	Fourth place	4	1	0	3	3	5	-2	3
(Papua New Guinea) 2015	Semi-finals	4	1	0	3	3	6	-3	3
(Fiji) 2019	Group Stage	3	1	0	2	8	7	+1	3
(New Zealand) 2023	Group Stage	2	0	0	2	0	5	-5	0
Total	Semi-Finals	32	6	2	24	46	94	-48	20

== Fixtures & results ==
=== 2019 ===
22 September 2019 2019 OFC Men's Olympic Qualifying Tournament Group Stage	Vanuatu	3-1	Papua New Guinea	Lautoka, Fiji
12:00	Soromon 3', 21'; Wilkins 25'	Report	Togubai 56'	Stadium: Churchill Park; Attendance: 150; Referee: (New Zealand) Matthew Conger

25 September 2019 2019 OFC Men's Olympic Qualifying Tournament Group Stage	Fiji	3-1	Papua New Guinea	Lautoka, Fiji
15:00	Baledrokadroka 42'; Joseph 50'; Vodowaqa 87'	Report	Simongi 66'	Stadium: Churchill Park; Attendance: 250; Referee: (New Zealand) Nick Waldron

28 September 2019 2019 OFC Men's Olympic Qualifying Tournament Group Stage	Papua New Guinea	6-1	Tonga	Lautoka, Fiji
12:00	Kepo 11', 73'; Togubai 45', 49' (pen.); Purari 55'; Malafu 72' (o.g.)	Report		Stadium: Churchill Park; Referee: (New Zealand) Campbell-Kirk Kawana-Waugh

== Current technical staff ==
Position	
Head coach	(Australia) Warren Moon
Assistant coach	(Papua New Guinea) David Muta
Team manager	(Papua New Guinea) Gordon Manub

== Current squad ==
The following players were called to the squad for the 2019 OFC Men's Olympic Qualifying Tournament from 21 September - 5 October 2019.
Caps and goals updated as of 28 September 2019 after the match against the Tonga.

No.	Pos.	Player	Date of birth (age)	Caps	Goals	Club
1	GK	Jordan Tobem	28 August 1997 (age 29)	2	0	(Papua New Guinea Football Association) Morobe United
18	GK	Jonathan Pole	19 January 1999 (age 27)	1	0	(Papua New Guinea Football Association) Morobe United
20	GK	Jerry Seriba	15 May 1999 (age 27)	1	0	(Papua New Guinea Football Association) Kagua Erave
2	DF	Peter Dabinyaba Jr.	23 March 1997 (age 29)	3	0	(Papua New Guinea Football Association) Vitiaz United
3	DF	Carlos Onne	4 July 1999 (age 27)	3	0	(Papua New Guinea Football Association) Hekari United
4	DF	Gimale Essacu	4 July 1997 (age 29)	4	0	(United States Soccer Federation) Western Illinois University
5	DF	Rupa Amil	1 October 1997 (age 29)	1	0	(Papua New Guinea Football Association) Gulf Komara
14	DF	Gabby Yanum	5 February 1997 (age 29)	3	0	(Papua New Guinea Football Association) Bougainville
17	DF	Edward Joshua	4 January 1999 (age 27)	1	0	(Papua New Guinea Football Association) Lae City
	DF	Felix Komolong	6 March 1997 (age 29)	6	0	(Papua New Guinea Football Association) Lae City
6	MF	Timothy Mali	19 June 1998 (age 28)	0	0	(Papua New Guinea Football Association) FC Bougainville
7	MF	Gregory Togubai	22 March 1998 (age 28)	3	3	(Papua New Guinea Football Association) Hekari United
8	MF	Freddy Kepo	19 April 1998 (age 28)	3	2	(Papua New Guinea Football Association) Hekari United
11	MF	Bernard Purari	10 May 1997 (age 29)	3	1	(Papua New Guinea Football Association) Bougainville
12	MF	Emmanuel Simongi	25 September 2000 (age 26)	3	1	(Papua New Guinea Football Association) Kutubu
13	MF	Joseph Waiwai	7 March 2001 (age 25)	1	0	(Papua New Guinea Football Association) Star Mountain
15	MF	Yagi Yasasa	17 August 2000 (age 26)	3	0	(Papua New Guinea Football Association) Vitiaz United
19	MF	Ernest Gwaitep	22 December 1997 (age 28)	2	0	(Papua New Guinea Football Association) Lae City
9	FW	Pokana Mea	14 May 1997 (age 29)	2	0	(Papua New Guinea Football Association) Gulf Komara
10	FW	Franck Toboroyan	6 October 1997 (age 29)	0	0	(Papua New Guinea Football Association) Hekari United
16	FW	Tyran Vapara	24 July 1997 (age 29)	3	0	(Papua New Guinea Football Association) Southern Strikers

== List of coaches ==
- (Australia) Frank Farina (2012)
- (Denmark) Flemming Serritslev (2015)
- (Papua New Guinea) Percy Mataio (2019)
- (Argentina) Santiago Marina (2022-2023)
- (Australia) Warren Moon (2023-present)
