= Kyah Cahill =

Samoan footballer

Personal information
- Full name: Kyah Tim Cahill
- Date of birth: 13 March 2003 (age 23)
- Place of birth: London, England
- Height: 1.78 m (5 ft 10 in)
- Position: Forward

Youth career
- 2019–2020: Macclesfield Town
- 2020–2021: Leganés
- 2021–2022: Rayo Vallecano

International career^{‡}
Years	Team	Apps	(Gls)
2022	Samoa U20	2	(0)
2023–	Samoa U23	3	(1)
2024–	Samoa	2	(0)
- ‡ National team caps and goals as of 02:50, 26 September 2023 (UTC)

Kyah Tim Cahill (born 13 March 2003) is a footballer who last played for the Lusail Football Academy. Born in England, he plays for the Samoa national team.

== Club career ==
Until 2019 Cahill was playing youth football in New Jersey, United States where the family lived while his father played for the New York Red Bulls from 2012 to 2015. He played high school soccer for Northern Highlands Regional High School from 2017 to 2019.

In 2019 he joined the academy of League Two club Macclesfield Town. He was a consistent scorer for the U19 squad and earned at least one Man-of-the-Match honour. He left in 2020 when the club folded because of financial difficulties. Following his departure, he joined the academy of CD Leganés of Spain's Segunda División. In March 2021 he joined the academy of fellow Madrid-based club Rayo Vallecano of La Liga.

By 2022 Cahill had joined the Lusail Football Academy in Doha, Qatar.

== International career ==
In August 2022 Cahill was included in Samoa's roster for the 2022 OFC U-19 Championship. This was his first international call-up for Samoa. He made his international debut on 14 September 2022, in a 0–4 loss to New Caledonia in the Group stage of the tournament.

Cahill was later called up to the Samoa U23 team for the 2023 OFC Men's Olympic Qualifying Tournament. He scored his team’s game-winning goal in a 3–0 victory over Tonga in the Group Stage. He served as the team’s captain throughout the tournament.

== Personal life ==
Cahill is the son of Socceroos player Tim Cahill and nephew of Samoan former internationals Sean Cahill and Chris Cahill. As a youth his interests were in the performing arts which led him to auditions for Disney and Broadway.
