= Greg Siamoa =

Samoan association football player

Personal information
- Full name: Greg Nikolao Siamoa
- Date of birth: 21 August 2003 (age 23)
- Place of birth: Melbourne, Australia
- Height: 1.87 m (6 ft 2 in)
- Position: Center forward

Team information
- Current team: Springvale White Eagles
- Number: 20

Youth career
- –2023: Western United

Senior career*
Years	Team	Apps	(Gls)
2023–2024	Green Gully SC	8	(0)
2024	Mazenod FC	8	(0)
2024	Life Sihanoukville	5	(0)
2025	Brunswick Juventus	26	(8)
2026–	Springvale White Eagles	24	(6)

International career^{‡}
2022	Samoa U-19s	2	(0)
2023	Samoa U-23s	3	(2)
2024–	Samoa	1	(0)
- * Club domestic league appearances and goals as of 29 August 2026 ‡ National team caps and goals as of 22 July 2024

Greg Siamoa (born 21 August 2003) is a Samoan association footballer.

== Club career ==
Siamoa rose through the ranks of A-League Men club Western United where he showed high levels of skill and promise in their academy team, where he was provided with an opportunity to represent Samoa in their 2022 OFC U-19 Championship qualification for the 2023 FIFA U-20 World Cup.

=== Green Gully SC ===
In 2023, to further his chances of playing international football for Samoa, Siamoa moved to National Premier Leagues Victoria club Green Gully SC

=== Life Sihanoukville ===
On 3 July 2024, Siamoa signed with Cambodian Premier League club Life Sihanoukville as their first international signing for the 2024–25 Cambodian Premier League On 14 October, Siamoa departed the club.

== International career ==
Having impressed at National Premier Leagues level for the Western United academy team, Siamoa was called up to the Samoa U-19s.

Siamoa scored twice for the Samoan U-23s during their 2023 OFC Men's Olympic Qualifying Tournament match against Tonga, in which Samoa would run out 3–0 winners.

=== Senior ===
In 2024, Siamoa made his full international debut for Samoa when he was called up to the national team by Ryan Stewart for the 2024 OFC Men's Nations Cup He made his debut against Tahiti on 16 June 2024.
