= Timote Moleni =

Tongan footballer (born 1969)

Personal information
- Full name: Timote Moleni
- Date of birth: 27 June 1969 (age 57)
- Place of birth: Tonga
- Position: Midfielder

Team information
- Current team: Tonga

Senior career*
Years	Team	Apps	(Gls)
1996–2007	Kolofoʻou No.1		

International career
1996–2001	Tonga	8	(2)

Managerial career
- 2012: Tonga U23
- 2013–2015: Tonga U17
- 2015–2023: Tonga
- 2017–2018: Veitongo FC
- 2019–2020: FC Ahau
- 2022–2023: Tonga U20
- 2022–2023: Veitongo FC
- 2026–: Tonga
- * Club domestic league appearances and goals

Timote Moleni (born 27 June 1969) is a former Tongan footballer who played as a midfielder. Moleni was appointed head coach of Tonga in 2015.

In 2012 he managed the Tonga national under-23 football team for the 2012 OFC Men's Olympic Qualifying Tournament. In 2013 he managed the under-17 team for the 2013 OFC U-17 Championship. In 2015 he managed the national team for the world cup qualifiers. He has also managed Veitongo FC in the Tonga Major League and OFC Champions League.
