= Etienne Mermer =

Vanuatuan footballer and manager

Personal information
- Date of birth: 26 January 1977 (age 49)
- Place of birth: Luganville, New Hebrides
- Height: 1.77 m (5 ft 9 1/2 in)
- Position: Forward

Senior career*
Years	Team	Apps	(Gls)
1998–2000	Nipikinamu Lenakel		
2001	Tafea		
2002	Nipikinamu Lenakel		
2003–2004	Mitchelton		
2005–2006	Tafea		
2006–2007	AS Manu-Ura		(11+)
2008	Port Vila Sharks		
2008–2010	Tafea		

International career
1998–2008	Vanuatu	33	(15)

Managerial career
- 2010: Vanuatu U15
- 2012–2016: Vanuatu U17
- 2013–2017: Vanuatu U20
- 2014–2016: Spirit 08
- 2016–2017: Erakor Golden Star
- 2017: Vanuatu U20 (assistant)
- 2017–2018: Vanuatu
- 2019–2023: Vanuatu
- 2019–2022: Vanuatu U23
- 2023: Vanuatu (assistant)
- 2025: Vanuatu U16
- * Club domestic league appearances and goals

Etienne Mermer (born 26 January 1977) is a Vanuatuan football manager and former footballer who played as a forward.

== Playing career ==
In 2004, Mermer and Richard Iwai were both the first, and at the time only, footballers from Vanuatu to be playing abroad, with both of them also briefly being teammates at Mitchelton in Australia.

=== International career ===
Mermer made a total of 33 appearances for Vanuatu between 1998 and 2008, scoring 15 goals and representing his country at five OFC Nations Cups.

In August 2007, during a 15–0 win against American Samoa, he scored four goals while teammate Seule Soromon scored five, becoming the last time two players scored a poker (4+ goals) in a single match until Erling Haaland and Thelo Aasgaard in Norway's 11–1 win against Moldova in 2026 FIFA World Cup qualification.

== Managerial career ==
In 2010, Mermer was the manager of Vanuatu's under-15 national team at that year's Summer Youth Olympics in Singapore.

In March 2017, it was announced that Mermer would not travel with the Vanuatu under-20 national team to the 2017 FIFA U-20 World Cup in South Korea.

In December 2017, while the manager of the Vanuatu national team, he helped them win a gold medal at the 2017 Pacific Mini Games, which helped jump Vanuatu's FIFA World Ranking 28 places, up to 157th. He was also the Vanuatu under-23 national team manager when they finished third at the 2019 OFC Men's Olympic Qualifying Tournament.

In 2025, he took charge of Vanuatu's under-16 national team during 2025 OFC U-16 Men's Championship qualification.

== Personal life ==
While active as a player, Mermer also spent six years working as a primary school teacher. His son, Eddy, is also a footballer who plays for United Malampa.

In 2014, he became the second person from Vanuatu to obtain an OFC B Coaching License.
