= Samoa national under-23 football team =

Samoa U-23 represents Samoa at U23 tournaments

Samoa U23
- Association: Football Federation Samoa
- Confederation: OFC (Oceania)
- Head coach: (Samoa) Desmond Fa'aiuaso
- Captain: Willie Sauiluma
- Top scorer: Michael Tumua Leo (3)
- FIFA code: SAM
| First colours | Second colours |

First international
- Fiji 4–0 Samoa (Auckland, New Zealand; December 11, 1999)

Biggest win
- American Samoa 0–5 Samoa (Suva, Fiji; September 27, 2019)

Biggest defeat
- Australia 6–0 Samoa (Sydney, Australia; January 16, 2004)

OFC U23 Championship
- Appearances: 4 (First in 1999)
- Best result: Group Stage (1999, 2004, 2019, 2023)

The Samoa national under-23 football team, also known as Samoa U-23, represents Samoa at U23 tournaments. The team is considered to be the feeder team for the Samoa national football team and is controlled by the Football Federation of Samoa.

== History ==
Samoa U23 made two appearances so far at the OFC U23 Championship, in 1999 and 2004. They never reached further than the Group Stage. In 2019 they will participate again.

=== OFC ===
The OFC Men's Olympic Qualifying Tournament is a tournament held once every four years to decide the only qualification spot for Oceania Football Confederation (OFC) and representatives at the Olympic Games.

OFC Men's Olympic Qualifying Tournament
| Year | Round | Pld | W | D | L | GF | GA |
|---|---|---|---|---|---|---|---|
| (Australia) (New Zealand) 1988 | See Samoa national football team | | | | | | |
| (Fiji) 1991 | Did not enter | | | | | | |
| (Australia) 1996 | Did not enter | | | | | | |
| (New Zealand) 1999 | Group Stage | 3 | 1 | 0 | 2 | 5 | 7 |
| (Australia) (New Zealand) 2004 | Group Stage | 4 | 1 | 1 | 2 | 5 | 14 |
| (Fiji) 2008 | Did not enter | | | | | | |
| (New Zealand) 2012 | Did not enter | | | | | | |
| (Papua New Guinea) 2015 | Did not enter | | | | | | |
| (Fiji) 2019 | Group Stage | 3 | 1 | 0 | 2 | 6 | 11 |
| (New Zealand) 2023 | Group Stage | 3 | 1 | 0 | 2 | 4 | 6 |
| Total | Group stage | 13 | 4 | 1 | 8 | 20 | 38 |

== Current squad ==
The following players were called to the squad for the 2019 OFC Men's Olympic Qualifying Tournament from 21 September - 5 October 2019.
Caps and goals updated as of 27 September 2019 after the match against American Samoa.

| No. | Pos. | Player | Date of birth (age) | Caps | Goals | Club |
|---|---|---|---|---|---|---|
| 1 | GK | Eti Fatu | 25 February 2001 (age 25) | 3 | 0 | (Football Federation Samoa) Vaivase-Tai |
| 20 | GK | Tavita Galuvao | 28 August 2001 (age 25) | 1 | 0 | (Football Federation Samoa) Vaitele-uta |
| 2 | DF | Tauati Tanoai | 19 April 1998 (age 28) | 3 | 0 | (Football Federation Samoa) Lupe o le Soaga |
| 3 | DF | Harlen Russell | 23 March 2000 (age 26) | 3 | 0 | (New Zealand Football) Glenfield Rovers |
| 4 | DF | Osa Savelio | 2 May 2000 (age 26) | 3 | 1 | (Football Federation Samoa) Lepea |
| 10 | DF | Jay Popese | 3 August 2000 (age 26) | 2 | 0 | (Football Federation Samoa) Vaipuna |
| 15 | DF | Christian Aluni | 23 September 1999 (age 27) | 1 | 0 | (Football Federation Samoa) Vaivase-Tai |
| 18 | DF | Jefferson Faamatau | 12 July 2000 (age 26) | 2 | 0 | (Football Federation Samoa) Vaipuna |
| 19 | DF | Jerrymiah Maiava | 19 November 2000 (age 25) | 2 | 0 | (Football Federation Samoa) Vaivase-Tai |
| 6 | MF | Vaa Taualai | 6 April 1998 (age 28) | 2 | 0 | (Football Federation Samoa) Lupe o le Soaga |
| 7 | MF | Willie Sauiluma | 12 July 2000 (age 26) | 3 | 0 | (Football Australia) Goulburn Valley Suns |
| 8 | MF | Michael Tumua Leo | 13 January 2003 (age 23) | 3 | 3 | (Football Federation Samoa) Vaipuna |
| 12 | MF | Sean Atherton | 24 September 1999 (age 27) | 2 | 0 | (New Zealand Football) Oratia United |
| 13 | MF | Dilo Tumua | 15 March 2000 (age 26) | 2 | 0 | (Football Federation Samoa) Vaipuna |
| 14 | MF | Samuelu Malo | 4 April 1999 (age 27) | 1 | 1 | (Football Federation Samoa) Kiwi |
| 16 | MF | Darcy Knight | 18 February 2000 (age 26) | 2 | 0 | (New Zealand Football) Onehunga Sports |
| 17 | MF | Fomai Euta | 15 October 1999 (age 27) | 1 | 0 | (Football Federation Samoa) Vaitele-uta |
| 9 | FW | Kawasaki Saofaiga | 4 March 2002 (age 24) | 3 | 0 | (Football Federation Samoa) Lepea |
| 11 | FW | Ronnie Bourne | 22 September 1999 (age 27) | 3 | 1 | (Football Federation Samoa) Lepea |

== List of coaches ==
- (Samoa) Desmond Fa'aiuaso (2019)

== See also ==
- Samoa national football team
- Samoa national under-20 football team
- Samoa national under-17 football team
