= Turagabeci =

Turagabeci is a surname. Notable people with the surname include:

- Caucau Turagabeci (born 1939), Fijian international lawn bowler
- Joseph Turagabeci (born 1994), Fijian footballer
