= Solomon Islands national under-23 football team =

Solomon Islands U23
- Nickname: Bonitos
- Association: Solomon Islands Football Federation
- Confederation: OFC (Oceania)
- Head coach: (Solomon Islands) Batram Suri
- Captain: Philip Mango
- Most caps: Ian Paia (3)
- Top scorer: Ian Paia (7)
- FIFA code: SOL
First colours	Second colours

First international
- Papua New Guinea 2 – 4 Solomon Islands (Auckland, New Zealand; January 14, 2004)

Biggest win
- American Samoa 1 – 16 Solomon Islands (Taupō, New Zealand; March 21, 2012)

Biggest defeat
- Australia 5 – 0 Solomon Islands (Sydney, Australia; January 20, 2004)

OFC U23 Championship
- Appearances: 8
- Best result: Runners-up (1999, 2008, 2019)

MSG Prime Minister's Cup
- Appearances: 1 (first in 2024)
- Best result: Fifth place (2024)

The Solomon Islands national under-23 football team, also known as Solympic and Solomon Islands "B", represents the Solomon Islands at U23 tournaments. The team is considered to be the feeder team for the Solomon Islands national football team.

== History ==
The Solomon Islands U23 made five appearances so far at the OFC U23 Championship. Their best result was a second place twice, in 1999 and in 2008. In 2015 they will make their sixth appearance during the 2015 Pacific Games.

=== OFC ===
The OFC Men's Olympic Qualifying Tournament is a tournament held once every four years to decide the only qualification spot for Oceania Football Confederation (OFC) and representatives at the Olympic Games.

OFC Men's Olympic Qualifying Tournament
Year	Round	Pld	W	D	L	GF	GA
(Fiji) 1991	Did not enter						
(Australia) 1996	Fourth place	8	2	2	4	12	21
(New Zealand) 1999	Runners-up	5	4	0	1	15	6
(Australia) 2004	Group stage	4	1	0	3	5	12
(Fiji) 2008	Runners-up	5	4	0	1	25	5
(New Zealand) 2012	Group stage	3	1	0	2	16	4
(Papua New Guinea) 2015	Group stage	3	0	0	3	1	5
(Fiji) 2019	Runners-up	5	3	0	2	14	9
(New Zealand) 2023	Semi-Final	4	3	0	1	11	4
Total	37	37	18	2	17	99	66

== Current squad ==
The following players were called to the squad for the 2019 OFC Men's Olympic Qualifying Tournament from 21 September - 5 October 2019.
Caps and goals updated as of 5 October 2019 after the match against New Zealand.

No.	Pos.	Player	Date of birth (age)	Caps	Goals	Club
1	GK	Desmond Tutu	29 September 1997 (age 29)	3	0	(Solomon Islands Football Federation) Henderson Eels
12	GK	Harold Nauania	10 October 1997 (age 29)	2	0	(Solomon Islands Football Federation) Isabel United
20	GK	Joel Nanogo	23 December 2000 (age 25)	0	0	(Solomon Islands Football Federation) Real Kakamora
2	DF	Junior David	22 September 2001 (age 25)	5	0	(Papua New Guinea Football Association) Hekari United
3	DF	John Aeta	2 September 2000 (age 26)	5	0	(Solomon Islands Football Federation) Marist
4	DF	Gagame Aengari Jr.	15 April 2000 (age 26)	5	0	(Solomon Islands Football Federation) Solomon Warriors
5	DF	William Komasi	10 June 2000 (age 26)	5	0	(Solomon Islands Football Federation) Malaita Kingz
13	DF	Alick Kitalo	15 November 1997 (age 28)	2	0	(Solomon Islands Football Federation) Malaita Kingz
15	DF	George Leaga	18 November 1999 (age 26)	2	0	(Solomon Islands Football Federation) Kossa
6	MF	Rodney Suri	12 March 1997 (age 29)	4	0	(Solomon Islands Football Federation) Henderson Eels
7	MF	Augustine Waita	13 June 1997 (age 29)	5	5	(Solomon Islands Football Federation) Henderson Eels
8	MF	Patrick Taroga	25 May 2000 (age 26)	5	3	(Solomon Islands Football Federation) Henderson Eels
11	MF	Tuita Maeobia	2 January 1999 (age 27)	4	1	(Solomon Islands Football Federation) Isabel United
14	MF	Steve Maelasi	1 January 1997 (age 29)	4	0	(Solomon Islands Football Federation) Solomon Warriors
16	MF	Frank Kabui	23 October 2000 (age 26)	5	0	(Solomon Islands Football Federation) Malaita Kingz
17	MF	John Oge	8 August 1998 (age 28)	1	0	(Solomon Islands Football Federation) Isabel United
18	MF	Molis Gagame	14 September 1999 (age 27)	4	0	(Solomon Islands Football Federation) Solomon Warriors
9	FW	Adrian Mara	1 August 1998 (age 28)	2	3	(Solomon Islands Football Federation) Kossa
10	FW	Darold Kakasi	7 February 1999 (age 27)	5	2	(Fiji Football Association) Ba
19	FW	Raynick Laeta	16 November 1999 (age 26)	2	0	(Solomon Islands Football Federation) Henderson Eels
	DF	Graham Tanavole	7 April 1997 (age 29)	0	0	(Solomon Islands Football Federation) The Saints
	MF	Thomas Amasia	25 August 1998 (age 28)	0	0	(Solomon Islands Football Federation) Marist

== Squad for the 2015 Pacific Games ==
The following players were called to the squad for the 2015 Pacific Games from 3–17 July 2015.
Caps and goals updated as of 17 June 2015 after the match against New Caledonia.

No.	Pos.	Player	Date of birth (age)	Caps	Goals	Club
1	GK	Philip Mango	28 August 1995 (age 31)	4	0	(Solomon Islands Football Federation) Marist
20	GK	Anthony Talo	8 January 1996 (age 30)	1	0	(Solomon Islands Football Federation) Western United
23	GK	James Do'oro	19 June 1995 (age 31)	0	0	(Solomon Islands Football Federation) Henderson Eels
2	DF	Fred Buai	11 August 1994 (age 32)	3	0	
3	DF	Matson Fenny	16 December 1993 (age 32)	4	0	(Solomon Islands Football Federation) Solomon Warriors
4	DF	Dickson Mouli	3 May 1993 (age 33)	0	0	(Solomon Islands Football Federation) Real Kakamora FC
5	DF	Allen Peter	15 September 1995 (age 31)	4	0	(Solomon Islands Football Federation) Malaita Kingz
12	DF	George Ladoga	19 November 1994 (age 31)	1	0	(Solomon Islands Football Federation) X-Beam
15	DF	John Rofeta	2 September 1994 (age 32)	1	0	(Solomon Islands Football Federation) Marist
16	DF	Fred Bala (c)	10 July 1995 (age 31)	1	0	(Solomon Islands Football Federation) Kossa
18	DF	Davidson Tome	17 May 1994 (age 32)	4	0	(Solomon Islands Football Federation) Marist
19	DF	Simon Daoi	8 January 1996 (age 30)	3	0	(Solomon Islands Football Federation) Marist
21	DF	Natanela Bero	28 November 1994 (age 31)	1	0	(Solomon Islands Football Federation) Marist
6	MF	Fredrick Dola	6 April 1994 (age 32)	0	0	(Solomon Islands Football Federation) Marist
8	MF	Jimmy Raramane	11 February 1994 (age 32)	1	0	(Solomon Islands Football Federation) Kossa
13	MF	Jared Rangosulia	6 November 1995 (age 31)	1	0	(Solomon Islands Football Federation) Henderson Eels
17	MF	Timothy Bakale	29 March 1995 (age 31)	4	0	(Solomon Islands Football Federation) Marist
	MF	Joachim Kairi	10 April 1995 (age 31)	0	0	(Solomon Islands Football Federation) Marist
7	FW	Harrison Mala	14 July 1994 (age 32)	4	0	(Solomon Islands Football Federation) FC Guadalcanal
9	FW	Frank Foli	20 September 1994 (age 32)	0	0	(Solomon Islands Football Federation) Hana
10	FW	Tutizama Tanito	27 November 1993 (age 32)	4	1	(Papua New Guinea Football Association) Hekari United
11	FW	Atana Fa'arado	3 November 1994 (age 32)	4	0	(Solomon Islands Football Federation) Henderson Eels
14	FW	Boni Pride	10 September 1995 (age 31)	1	0	(Solomon Islands Football Federation) Henderson Eels
22	FW	Kevin Obed	4 April 1996 (age 30)	0	0	(New Zealand Football) Nelson Falcons

== Squad for the 2012 OFC Men's Olympic Qualifying Football Tournament ==
No.	Pos.	Player	Date of birth (age)	Caps	Goals	Club
20	GK	Silas Seda	8 September 1992 (age 34)	3	0	(Solomon Islands Football Federation) Solomon Warriors
1	GK	Samson Koti	11 December 1991 (age 34)	0	0	(Solomon Islands Football Federation) Solomon Warriors
3	DF	Freddie Kini	27 November 1992 (age 33)	3	0	(Solomon Islands Football Federation) Western United
4	DF	Chris Tafoa	18 December 1992 (age 33)	3	1	(Solomon Islands Football Federation) Kossa
5	DF	Israel Kote Fanai (c)	7 April 1992 (age 34)	1	0	(Solomon Islands Football Federation) Koloale FC Honiara
6	DF	Michael Boso	3 September 1991 (age 35)	2	0	(Solomon Islands Football Federation) Western United
15	DF	Francis Lafai	21 October 1990 (age 36)	1	0	(Solomon Islands Football Federation) Koloale FC Honiara
16	DF	Emmanuel Poila	16 July 1990 (age 36)	3	0	(Papua New Guinea Football Association) Hekari United
7	MF	James Egeta	10 August 1990 (age 36)	1	0	(Solomon Islands Football Federation) Malaita Kingz
8	MF	Jeffrey Bule	15 November 1991 (age 34)	3	0	(Solomon Islands Football Federation) Western United
9	MF	Moffat Kilifa	17 January 1989 (age 37)	3	0	(Vanuatu Football Federation) Ifira Black Bird
12	MF	Jerry Donga	31 January 1991 (age 35)	3	1	(Solomon Islands Football Federation) Solomon Warriors
13	MF	Mollis Gagame	21 September 1989 (age 37)	1	0	(Solomon Islands Football Federation) Western United
17	MF	Coleman Makau	25 November 1992 (age 33)	2	0	(Solomon Islands Football Federation) Malaita Kingz
18	MF	Himson Teleda	28 August 1992 (age 34)	1	1	(Solomon Islands Football Federation) Western United
19	FW	Micah Lea'alafa	1 June 1991 (age 35)	3	3	(Vanuatu Football Federation) Amicale
2	FW	Johan Doiwale	7 February 1990 (age 36)	2	1	(Solomon Islands Football Federation) Real Kakamora
10	FW	Tutizama Tanito	27 November 1993 (age 32)	2	0	(Papua New Guinea Football Association) Hekari United
11	FW	Ian Paia	20 October 1990 (age 36)	3	7	(Solomon Islands Football Federation) Koloale FC Honiara
14	FW	Karol Kakate	2 November 1992 (age 34)	2	2	(Solomon Islands Football Federation) Western United

== List of coaches ==
- (Solomon Islands) Luke Eroi (2012)
- (Solomon Islands) Patrick Miniti (2015)
- (Solomon Islands) Batram Suri (2019–)
