= Ian Paia =

Solomon Islands footballer (born 1990)

Personal information
- Date of birth: 28 October 1990 (age 36)
- Place of birth: Solomon Islands
- Position: Forward

Team information
- Current team: Eastern Stars
- Number: 11

Senior career*
Years	Team	Apps	(Gls)
2011–2014	Koloale FC Honiara	77	(23)
2014–2017	Solomon Warriors		
2017	Ifira Black Bird		
2017	Solomon Warriors		
2018	Havelock North Wanderers		
2019–	Eastern Stars		

International career^{‡}
2012	Solomon Islands U23	3	(7)
2011–2012	Solomon Islands	6	(1)
Medal record
Men's football
Representing Solomon Islands
Pacific Games
Silver medal – second place	2011 New Caledonia
- * Club domestic league appearances and goals as of 24 December 2024 ‡ National team caps and goals as of 24 December 2024

Ian Paia (born 28 October 1990) is a Solomon Islands footballer who currently plays for Eastern Stars in the Papua New Guinea Premier Soccer League as a forward.

== Club career ==
Paia has been a youth product of Koloale FC Honiara. After a few years he signed for the Solomon Warriors in 2014. After playing in the OFC Champions League he signed in 2017 for Vanuatuan side Ifira Black Bird. After winning the Vanuatuan Championship he returned to the Solomon Warriors.

He then joined Havelock North Wanderers in 2018 before joining Eastern Stars in 2019, where he plays today.

== International career ==
=== Solomon Islands U23 ===
Paia played his first international game with the senior national team on 9 July 2011 against Vanuatu (0–0). He scored his only goal for Solomon Islands during a 7–0 win against Guam during the 2011 Pacific Games.

=== Solomon Islands ===
He would then represent the Solomon Islands U23 team during the 2012 OFC Men's Olympic Qualifying Tournament. He made his debut on 16 March 2012 during a 2–0 loss against Fiji U23. On his third and final cap, he scored all seven of his goals for Solomon Islands U23 during a 16–1 win against American Samoa U23 on 21 March 2012 to become their most capped and highest goalscoring player.

== Career statistics ==
=== International ===
As of match played 7 September 2012.

Appearances and goals by national team and year
National team	Year	Apps	Goals
Solomon Islands	2011	5	1
Solomon Islands	2012	1	0
Total		6	1

Scores and results list Solomon Islands' goal tally first, score column indicates score after each Paia goal.

List of international goals scored by Ian Paia
No.	Date	Venue	Cap	Opponent	Score	Result	Competition	Ref.
1.	27 August 2011	Stade Rivière Salée, Nouméa, New Caledonia	2	Guam	6–0	7–0	2011 Pacific Games	

== Honours ==
Koloale

- Solomon Islands National Club Championship/Telekom S-League: 2011

Ifira Black Bird

- Port Vila Premier League: 2017

Solomon Warriors

- Solomon Islands National Club Championship/Telekom S-League: 2017

Solomon Islands

- Pacific Games: Silver Medalist, 2011
