= Boni Pride =

Solomon Islands footballer

Personal information
- Date of birth: 10 September 1995 (age 31)
- Position: Defender

Team information
- Current team: Henderson Eels

Senior career*
Years	Team	Apps	(Gls)
2013–2015	Hana F.C.		
2016–	Henderson Eels		

International career^{‡}
2015	Solomon Islands U23	2	(0)
2017–	Solomon Islands	13	(0)
Medal record
Men's football
Representing Solomon Islands
Pacific Mini Games
Bronze medal – third place	2017 Vanuatu
- * Club domestic league appearances and goals as of 6 July 2018 ‡ National team caps and goals as of 18 July 2019

Boni Pride (born 10 September 1995) is a Solomon Islands international footballer who plays as a defender for Telekom S-League side Henderson Eels.

== Career statistics ==
=== International ===
As of matches played 6 July 2018.

National team	Year	Apps	Goals
Solomon Islands	2017	4	0
Solomon Islands	2018	0	0
Total		4	0

== Personal life ==
Boni Pride is the younger brother of fellow Solomon Islands footballer Joses Nawo.

== Honours ==
Solomon Islands

- Pacific Mini Games: Bronze Medalist, 2017
