= X-Beam F.C. =

X-Beam
- Full name: X-Beam Football Club
- Founded: 2013
- Ground: Lawson Tama Stadium
- Capacity: 22,000
- Manager: Peter Eke
- League: Telekom S-League
- 2014-15: 9th

X-Beam Football Club is a football club based in Honiara, Solomon Islands. They play their home games at Lawson Tama Stadium.

== Current squad ==
as of August 2014
Note: Flags indicate national team as defined under FIFA eligibility rules; some limited exceptions apply. Players may hold more than one non-FIFA nationality.

No.	Pos.	Nation	Player
1	GK	SOL	Polycarp Bonave
2		SOL	Tom Mae
3		SOL	Jeremy Masolo
4	DF	SOL	Robinson Billy
5		SOL	Edmond Taevo
6		SOL	Ivin Ruka
7	DF	SOL	Filia Lone
8	MF	SOL	Joachim Kairi
9		SOL	Michael Tomani
10	MF	SOL	John Duddley
11	MF	SOL	Danny Maeli
12		SOL	Robert Diau
13		SOL	Alfonso Danny

No.	Pos.	Nation	Player
14	DF	SOL	George Ladoga
15		SOL	Nelson Keso
16	MF	SOL	Ian Taevo
17	FW	SOL	Jay Nate Kairi
18	DF	SOL	Silas Samo
19		SOL	Brett Honisawa
20		SOL	Shayne Keru
21	FW	SOL	Herrick Lautalo
22		SOL	Henry Duddley
23		SOL	Hillary Fete
25		SOL	Lionel Owen
29	FW	SOL	Paul Huia
