= Michael Boso =

Solomon Islands footballer

Personal information
- Full name: Michael Steven Boso
- Date of birth: 3 September 1991 (age 35)
- Place of birth: Solomon Islands
- Height: 1.81 m (5 ft 11 in)
- Position: Defender

Team information
- Current team: Suva F.C.
- Number: 3

Senior career*
Years	Team	Apps	(Gls)
2010–2014	Malaita Kingz		
2014–2016	Western United		
2016–2018	Marist		
2018–	Team Wellington	0	(0)
2018–	Suva F.C.	2	(0)

International career^{‡}
2011	Solomon Islands U20	4	(0)
2012	Solomon Islands U23	0	(0)
2016–	Solomon Islands	13	(0)
Medal record
Representing Solomon Islands
MSG Prime Minister's Cup
Third place	2024 Solomon Islands
- * Club domestic league appearances and goals as of 11 February 2019 ‡ National team caps and goals as of 18 July 2019

Michael Steven Boso (born 3 September 1991) is a Solomon Islands footballer who plays as a defender for Suva F.C. in Fiji. He made his debut for the national team on October 5, 2016, in a 3–0 loss against New Caledonia.

== International ==
Boso was named to the Solomon Islands national squad for the first time for the 2016 OFC Nations Cup, but he didn't make the final squad. He made his debut four months later in a match against New Caledonia.

== Honours ==
Solomon Islands

- MSG Prime Minister's Cup: 3rd place, 2024
