= Rupesh Puna =

New Zealand footballer

Personal information
- Full name: Rupesh Puna
- Date of birth: 19 April 1981 (age 45)
- Place of birth: New Zealand
- Position: Defender

Team information
- Current team: Waitakere United

International career
Years	Team	Apps	(Gls)
2003–2004	New Zealand	2	(0)

Rupesh Puna (born 19 April 1981) is a retired professional footballer who represented New Zealand at international level.

== Playing career ==
Puna has played for Caversham AFC, Otago United and currently plays for Waitakere United in the New Zealand Football Championship.

Puna made his full All Whites debut in a 0–3 loss to Iran on 12 October 2003 and ended his international playing career with 2 A-international caps to his credit, his final cap an appearance in a 2–4 loss to Vanuatu on 2 June 2004.
