= Patrick Taroga =

Solomon Islands footballer

Personal information
- Full name: Patrick Taroga
- Date of birth: 25 May 2000 (age 26)
- Place of birth: Solomon Islands
- Position: Midfielder

Team information
- Current team: Henderson Eels
- Number: 8

Youth career
- –2017: Marist

Senior career*
Years	Team	Apps	(Gls)
2017–2019	Marist		
2019–	Henderson Eels		

International career
2018	Solomon Islands U20	5	(2)
2019	Solomon Islands U23	5	(3)
2019–	Solomon Islands		
- * Club domestic league appearances and goals

Patrick Taroga (born 25 May 2000) is a Solomon Islands professional footballer who plays as a midfielder for Henderson Eels.

== Club career ==
Taroga played in the youth of Marist under the guidance of Patrick Miniti. In 2017 he made his debut for the first team. After the Pacific Games in 2019, Taroga moved to the Henderson Eels. In December 2019 he was suspended by coach Eddie Marahare because he missed a game due to participation in a local island football competition.

== International ==
=== U20's ===
Taroga first international experience was with the Solomon Islands national under-20 football team. With the team he played at the 2018 OFC U-19 Championship. After three victory's in the group stage, they managed to reach the semi-final. However, they lost the semi-final by three goals to one against Tahit. This meant that not the Solomon Islands but Tahiti qualified for the 2019 FIFA U-20 World Cup for the first time. Taroga played in all five games for the Solomon Islands, scoring two goals: one against New Caledonia and one against Vanuatu.

=== Senior squad ===
Taroga was named in the Solomon Islands national squad for the first time for a training tour in The Netherlands by Dutch coach Wim Rijsbergen. During this tour he played in a few friendlies against Dutch amateur sides. After the training camp Taroga was also named in the squad for the 2019 Pacific Games. Taroga made his debut at this tournament in a game against American Samoa. He came in the 65 minute of play for Gagame Feni. Four minutes later, Taroga scored his first goal for the national team.
