= Riley Bidois =

New Zealand footballer (born 2002)

- Bidois playing for the Wellington Phoenix in 2026.

Personal information
- Full name: Riley Bidois
- Date of birth: 12 March 2002 (age 24)
- Place of birth: Tauranga, New Zealand
- Height: 6 ft 0 in (1.83 m)
- Position: Forward

Team information
- Current team: Wellington Phoenix (on loan from Monterey Bay)
- Number: 11

Youth career
- Tauranga City

Senior career*
Years	Team	Apps	(Gls)
2017–2019	Tauranga City		
2019–2023	Wellington Phoenix Reserves	28	(10)
2021	Lower Hutt City	16	(8)
2022–2023	Wellington Phoenix	5	(0)
2023	Dandenong City	16	(3)
2024–2025	Loudoun United	49	(7)
2026–	Monterey Bay	6	(4)
2026–	→ Wellington Phoenix (loan)	5	(3)

International career^{‡}
2023–2024	New Zealand U23	3	(6)
- * Club domestic league appearances and goals as of 22 November 2026 ‡ National team caps and goals as of 9 September 2023

Riley Bidois (born 12 March 2002) is a New Zealand professional footballer who plays as a forward for A-League Men club Wellington Phoenix on loan from USL Championship side Monterey Bay FC.

== Club career ==
Bidois playing for the Wellington Phoenix in October 2026, alongside Bryce Duke.

Bidois joined the Wellington Phoenix Reserves in 2019 after he was spotted playing in the Western Springs U17 tournament where he was Golden Boot. Before that, Bidois played for Tauranga City in the NRFL Division 1 for two years.

During 2020, Bidois also played for Lower Hutt City who were the Wellington Phoenix feeder club, that allowed the Phoenix team and players to play in the Central League portion of the New Zealand National League. He again played for Lower Hutt City in 2021 and was the league's second top goalscorer with 16 goals behind fellow Phoenix player George Ott.

Bidois was first called up to the Wellington Phoenix first team in April 2021 after a number of injuries affected the first team. He made his debut, coming off the bench late in the second half of the Phoenix 5–0 loss to Central Coast Mariners.

In February 2023 Bidois signed for Dandenong City in the NPL Victoria 2.

On 16 February 2024, it was announced that Bidois signed for USL Championship side Loudoun United. Bidois was released by Loudoun following their 2025 season.

In March 2026, Bidois signed with Monterey Bay FC for the USL Championship season.

On 1 September 2026, Bidois returned to Wellington Phoenix on loan for the 2026–27 season.

== International career ==
In July 2024, Bidois was named to the New Zealand U-23 team for the 2024 Summer Olympics, but was replaced ahead of the tournament after suffering a hamstring injury.

== Family and personal life ==
Bidois is the older brother of Auckland FC player, Jonty Bidois.
