= George Ladoga =

Solomon Islands footballer

Personal information
- Full name: George Washington Ladoga
- Date of birth: 19 November 1994 (age 31)
- Place of birth: Solomon Islands
- Position: Defender

Team information
- Current team: Three Kings United

Senior career*
Years	Team	Apps	(Gls)
2011–2013	Three Kings United	30	(5)
2013	Auckland United FC	8	(2)

International career
2011	Solomon Islands U-17	5	(0)
2013	Solomon Islands U-23	4	(0)
2013	Solomon Islands	1	(0)
- * Club domestic league appearances and goals

George Washington Ladoga (born 19 November 1994) is a Solomon Islands football player.

== Career ==
=== Club ===
Ladoga played for Three Kings United and for Auckland United in the ASB Youth League.

=== International ===
He was first nominated in March 2013 and made in this game, his first and only appearance for the Solomon Islands national football team. Ladoga played prior five games for the U-17 of Solomon Islands, in January 2011. In April 2015 was called to Solomon's U-23 team and played with the Solomon Islands national under-23 football team, the 2015 Pacific Games in Bisini, Papua New Guinea.
