= Gareth Rowe =

New Zealand footballer

Personal information
- Full name: Gareth Rowe
- Date of birth: 17 January 1977 (age 49)
- Place of birth: New Zealand
- Position: Defender

Team information
- Current team: Canterbury United

Senior career*
Years	Team	Apps	(Gls)
1999	Geylang United	?	(?)
2009–2010	Canterbury United	14	(1)

International career
1997	New Zealand U-20		
1997–2000	New Zealand	7	(0)
- * Club domestic league appearances and goals as of 30 April 2010

Gareth Rowe (born 17 January 1977) is a football (soccer) player who plays for Canterbury United and has represented New Zealand at international level.

== Club career ==
Rowe is recognised as one of the best defenders in New Zealand domestic football. When the decision was made in 2003 to play New Zealand's national league as a summer competition he declined to take part but decided for the 09-10 season, potentially the last one for summer football, to play for Canterbury United.

== International career ==
Rowe represented New Zealand at under 20 level before making his full All Whites debut as a substitute in a 7-0 win over Papua New Guinea on 11 June 1997 and ended his international playing career with seven A-international caps to his credit, his last cap an appearance in a 2-0 win over Malaysia on 19 August 2000.
