= Claude Aru =

Ni-Vanuatuan footballer (born 1997)

Personal information
- Date of birth: 25 April 1997 (age 29)
- Height: 1.74 m (5 ft 9 in)
- Position: Midfielder

Team information
- Current team: Ba Fc

Senior career*
Years	Team	Apps	(Gls)
2016–2017	Malampa Revivors		
2017–	Shepherds United		

International career^{‡}
	Vanuatu U20	6	(0)
	Vanuatu U23	5	(1)
2017–	Vanuatu	1	(0)
Medal record
Men's football
Representing Vanuatu
OFC Nations Cup
Runner-up	2024 Fiji/Vanuatu
OFC U-20 Championship
Runner-up	2016 Tonga/Vanuatu
Pacific Mini Games
Gold medal – first place	2017 Vanuatu
- * Club domestic league appearances and goals as of 13:04, 6 July 2018 (UTC) ‡ National team caps and goals as of 13:04, 6 July 2018 (UTC)

Claude Aru (born 25 April 1997) is a Ni-Vanuatuan professional footballer who plays as a midfielder for Port Vila Football League side Shepherds United and the Vanuatu national team. In 2022, he joined Fijian club Ba. He rejoined the team for the 2023 season.

His is married to María José Pilalo Castro, and is currently living in Dominica.

== Career statistics ==
=== International ===
As of matches played 6 July 2018.

National team	Year	Apps	Goals
Vanuatu	2017	1	0
Vanuatu	2018	0	0
Total		1	0

== Honours ==
Vanuatu

- OFC Nations Cup: Runner-up, 2024
- Pacific Mini Games: Gold Medalist, 2017

Vanuatu U20

- OFC U-20 Championship: Runner-up, 2016
