= 2004 OFC Men's Olympic Qualifying Tournament =

Tournament details
- Host countries: New Zealand; Australia
- Dates: 14–22 January 2004
- Teams: 10 (from 1 confederation)
- Venues: 2 (in 2 host cities)

Final positions
- Champions: Australia (3rd title)
- Runners-up: New Zealand

Tournament statistics
- Matches played: 22
- Goals scored: 116 (5.27 per match)
- Top scorer(s): (Vanuatu) Jean Maleb (New Zealand) Shane Smeltz (7 goals)

The 2004 OFC Men's Olympic Football Tournament, the fourth edition of the OFC Men's Olympic Qualifying Tournament, offered the winning Oceania Football Confederation (OFC) national under-23 side a place to compete at the quadrennial Summer Olympic Games. This was the second time that Australia and New Zealand co-hosted the qualifying tournament with them previously hosting the second round of the 1988 edition.

Ten teams competed in the 2004 edition with the teams being separated into two groups of five with the winner of each group to face off in the final. Australia and New Zealand would be the teams that qualified for the final with Australia winning the tie in two-legs to book a spot at the 2004 Olympics Games which was being held in Greece.

== Summary ==
The original dates of the 2004 edition was originally going to be held in June 2003 but after a meeting in March 2003, it was moved to January 2004 due to the fact that New Zealand was competing at the 2003 FIFA Confederations Cup while the other South Pacific nations were competing at the 2003 South Pacific Games which was being held in Fiji.

The matches for the group stage was playing at two venues. That being at Marconi Stadium which played out Group A which featured Australia, Fiji, Samoa, Solomon Islands and Papua New Guinea. Group B was played at the North Harbour Stadium which featured New Zealand, Vanuatu, Tonga, Cook Islands and American Samoa.

Group A saw Australia not concede a single goal during the group stage as they finished with twenty-six goals from four games and not conceding any in return as they finished top of the group, finishing ahead of Fiji. Coming in third was Samoa who defeated the Solomon Islands to overtake them especially after drawing with Papua New Guinea in the final match-day to record their best result in an OFC tournament. Group B saw New Zealand have a tougher time with a scrappy match against Tonga before falling behind early in the final group game against Vanuatu as they came back from two goals after nineteen minutes to secure a 3-2 win with Brent Fisher getting the winning goal to book their spot in the final.

The final round was played over two legs with the first leg being played at Parramatta Stadium. Two second-half goals from Jonathan McKain and Ahmad Elrich gave Australia a two goal advantage heading into the second leg which was played at North Harbour Stadium. The second leg was a different story with New Zealand having the chances before scoring in the 51st minute from Shane Smeltz. Though Australia would score in the 71st minute when Ryan Griffiths outpaced the New Zealand defender Rupesh Puna to give Australia an away goal in which New Zealand wouldn't be able to respond securing Australia's spot at the 2004 Olympics.

== First round ==
=== Group A ===
Pos	Team	Pld	W	D	L	GF	GA	GD	Pts		(Australia)	(Fiji)	(Samoa)	(Solomon Islands)	(Papua New Guinea)
1	Australia (H)	4	4	0	0	26	0	+26	12	Advance to Final	—	6–0	6–0	5–0	9–0
2	Fiji	4	3	0	1	12	8	+4	9		—	—	—	—	4–1
3	Samoa	4	1	1	2	5	14	−9	4		—	0–4	—	1–0	4–4
4	Solomon Islands	4	1	0	3	5	12	−7	3		—	1–4	—	—	4–2
5	Papua New Guinea	4	0	1	3	7	21	−14	1		—	—	—	—	—

Source: OFC
Legend: Blue = home team win; Yellow = draw; Red = away team win.
(H) Hosts
14 January 2004

Solomon Islands	4–2	Papua New Guinea
Maemae 32'; Sam 63', 83'; Fa'arodo 65'	Report	Sigamata 64'; Guti 80'

Marconi Stadium, Sydney
Attendance: 2,095
Referee: Charles Ariiotima (Tahiti)
14 January 2004

Australia	6–0	Samoa
Wilkshire 27'; Elrich 49', 78'; Brosque 54'; Thwaite 68'; Holman 72'	Report

Marconi Stadium, Sydney
Attendance: 2,095
Referee: Peter O'Leary (New Zealand)
16 January 2004

Australia	9–0	Papua New Guinea
MacAllister 8', 63'; Elrich 30'; McKain 38'; Dilevski 42'; North 55'; Carle 66', 73'; Pelikan 74'	Report

Marconi Stadium, Sydney
Attendance: 1,290
Referee: Lencie Fred (Vanuatu)
16 January 2004

Fiji	4–1	Solomon Islands
Vulivuli 3'; Vidovi 12'; Toma 64', 66'	Report	Maemae 75'

Marconi Stadium, Sydney
Attendance: 1,290
Referee: Ron Wilbur (Vanuatu)
18 January 2004

Fiji	4–1	Papua New Guinea
Ali 22'; Vulivuli 32', 70'; Vakatalesau 54'	Report	Nathaniel Lepani 47'

Marconi Stadium, Sydney
Attendance: 200
Referee: Peter O'Leary (New Zealand)
18 January 2004

Samoa	1–0	Solomon Islands
Fa'aiuaso 11'	Report

Marconi Stadium, Sydney
Attendance: 200
Referee: Neil Fox (New Zealand)
20 January 2004

Fiji	4–0	Samoa
Kumar 51'; Sabutu 57'; Lui 86' (o.g.); Vulivuli 90+1'	Report

Marconi Stadium, Sydney
Attendance: 1,500
Referee: Charles Ariiotima (Tahiti)
20 January 2004

Australia	5–0	Solomon Islands
Macallister 14'; Holman 34'; Wilkshire 60' (pen.); Griffiths 71'; Cansdell-Sherriff 90+2'	Report

Marconi Stadium, Sydney
Attendance: 2,000
Referee: Derek Rugg (New Zealand)
22 January 2004

Samoa	4–4	Papua New Guinea
Toleafoa 26'; Fa'aiuaso 55'; Timo 57'; Bureta 67'	Report	Davani 38' (pen.), 90+1'; Nathaniel Lepani 40', 65'

Marconi Stadium, Sydney
Attendance: 800
Referee: Ron Wilbur (Vanuatu)
22 January 2004

Australia	6–0	Fiji
Valeri 5'; Holman 6', 54'; Macallister 78', 87', 89'	Report

Marconi Stadium, Sydney
Attendance: 2,000
Referee: Neil Fox (New Zealand)

=== Group B ===
Pos	Team	Pld	W	D	L	GF	GA	GD	Pts		(New Zealand)	(Vanuatu)	(Tonga)	(Cook Islands)	(American Samoa)
1	New Zealand	4	4	0	0	25	2	+23	12	Advance to Final	—	3–2	2–0	9–0	11–0
2	Vanuatu	4	3	0	1	27	3	+24	9		—	—	—	—	—
3	Tonga	4	2	0	2	4	8	−4	6		—	0–6	—	1–0	—
4	Cook Islands	4	1	0	3	3	23	−20	3		—	0–11	—	—	—
5	American Samoa	4	0	0	4	2	25	−23	0		—	0–8	0–3	2–3	—

Source: OFC
Legend: Blue = home team win; Yellow = draw; Red = away team win.
14 January 2004

Tonga	3–0	American Samoa
Uhutai 54'; Papani 69'; Feao 90+2'	Report

North Harbour Stadium, Auckland
Attendance: 260
Referee: Gidas Bayung (Papua New Guinea)
14 January 2004

New Zealand	9–0	Cook Islands
Fisher 30', 55', 59'; Jones 32'; Pritchett 34', 73'; Pearce 82', 82'; Smith 90+4'	Report

North Harbour Stadium, Auckland
Attendance: 260
Referee: Andrew Moli (Solomon Islands)
16 January 2004

New Zealand	11–0	American Samoa
Pearce 8', 30', 39'; Smeltz 12', 52', 57', 66', 69'; Mulligan 26'; Smith 30'; Puna 88'	Report

North Harbour Stadium, Auckland
Attendance: 250
Referee: Intaz Shah (Fiji)
16 January 2004

Tonga	0–6	Vanuatu
	Report	Maleb 5', 42', 74'; Qorig 7'; Mahe 65' (pen.); Manumua 90+2' (o.g.)

North Harbour Stadium, Auckland
Attendance: 250
Referee: Simon Micallef (Australia)
18 January 2004

Cook Islands	0–11	Vanuatu
	Report	Maleb 5', 30', 42'; Yakeula 23', 86'; Thompsen 54', 79'; Kapi 68'; Joe 84'; Vava 89'; Angene 90' (o.g.)

North Harbour Stadium, Auckland
Attendance: 250
Referee: Leone Rakaroi (Fiji)
18 January 2004

New Zealand	2–0	Tonga
Bertos 35'; Turner 45'	Report

North Harbour Stadium, Auckland
Attendance: 250
Referee: Constantinos Diomis (Australia)
20 January 2004

Tonga	1–0	Cook Islands
Moala 25'	Report

North Harbour Stadium, Auckland
Attendance: 100
Referee: Intaz Shah (Fiji)
20 January 2004

American Samoa	0–8	Vanuatu
	Report	Waiwai 9'; Thompsen 11', 12', 30'; Qorig 22'; Tabe 64'; Kapi 81', 88'

North Harbour Stadium, Auckland
Attendance: 100
Referee: Constantinos Diomis (Australia)
22 January 2004

Cook Islands	3–2	American Samoa
T. Tisam 17', 46'; Best 24'	Report	Atuelevao 67', 69'

North Harbour Stadium, Auckland
Attendance: 200
Referee: Andrew Moli (Solomon Islands)
22 January 2004

New Zealand	3–2	Vanuatu
Lochhead 42'; Smeltz 51'; Fisher 62'	Report	Maleb 9'; Thompsen 19'

North Harbour Stadium, Auckland
Attendance: 1,000
Referee: Simon Micallef (Australia)

== Final ==
Team 1	Agg.	Team 2	1st leg	2nd leg
Australia	3–1	New Zealand	2–0	1–1

First Leg

26 January 2004
16:50 AEST

Australia	2–0	New Zealand
McKain 76'; Elrich 83'	report

Parramatta Stadium, Sydney
Attendance: 7,120

Second Leg

30 January 2004
19:30 NZST

New Zealand	1–1	Australia
Smeltz 51'	report	Griffiths 71'

North Harbour Stadium, Auckland
Attendance: 3,000

Australia won 3–1 on aggregate.

2004 OFC Olympic Qualification Championship

Australia
Third title

== Goalscorers ==
7 goals

- (Vanuatu) Jean Maleb
- (New Zealand) Shane Smeltz

6 goals

- (Vanuatu) Lorry Thompsen
- (Australia) Dylan Macallister

5 goals

- (New Zealand) Allan Pearce

4 goals

- (New Zealand) Brent Fisher
- (Australia) Ahmad Elrich
- (Australia) Brett Holman
- (Fiji) Thomas Vulivuli

3 goals

- (Papua New Guinea) Nathaniel Lepani
- (Vanuatu) Isaac Kapi

2 goals

- (Australia) Luke Wilkshire
- (Australia) Nicky Carle
- (Fiji) Veresa Toma
- (Papua New Guinea) Alexander Davani
- (Samoa) Richmond Faaiuaso
- (Solomon Islands) Jerry Sam
- (Solomon Islands) Alick Maemae
- (American Samoa) Duane Atuelevao
- (Cook Islands) Tuka Tisam
- (New Zealand) James Pritchett
- (New Zealand) Jarrod Smith
- (Vanuatu) Dimitri Yakeula
- (Vanuatu) Alphose Qorig
