= Vanuatu national under-23 football team =

National association football team

Vanuatu U23
- Nickname: Vanuatu Cyclone
- Association: Vanuatu Football Federation
- Confederation: OFC (Oceania)
- Head coach: (Vanuatu) Etienne Mermer
- Captain: Brian Kaltack
- Most caps: Jean Kaltak (13)
- Top scorer: Jean Kaltak (21)
- FIFA code: VAN
First colours	Second colours

First international
- Australia 9–1 Vanuatu (Adelaide, Australia; 13 January 1996)

Biggest win
- Federated States of Micronesia 0–46 Vanuatu (Port Moresby, Papua New Guinea; 7 July 2015)

Biggest defeat
- Australia 12–0 Vanuatu (Adelaide, Australia; 25 January 1996)

World Cup
- Appearances: 0

OFC U23 Championship
- Appearances: 8
- Best result: Runners-up (2015)

MSG Prime Minister's Cup
- Appearances: 1
- Best result: Runners-up (2022)

The Vanuatu national under-23 football team, also known as Vanuatu Cyclone and Vanuatu "B", represents Vanuatu at U23 tournaments. The team is considered to be the feeder team for the Vanuatu national football team. They are controlled by the Vanuatu Football Federation. The team has gained notoriety for thrashing Micronesia's side 46–0 in the 2015 Pacific Games.

== History ==
Vanuatu U23 made four appearances so far at the OFC U23 Championship. Their best result was a third place in 2012. In 2015 they will make their fifth appearance during the 2015 Pacific Games in Papua New Guinea but before that, they will play a tournament called the Four Nation’s Friendship Cup.

=== OFC ===
The OFC Men's Olympic Qualifying Tournament is a tournament held once every four years to decide the only qualification spot for Oceania Football Confederation (OFC) and representatives at the Olympic Games.

OFC Men's Olympic Qualifying Tournament
Year	Round	Pld	W	D	L	GF	GA	GD	Pts
(Fiji) 1991	Did not enter								
(Australia) 1996	5th place	8	1	1	6	5	43	-38	4
(New Zealand) 1999	Group stage	2	0	0	2	0	6	-6	0
(Australia) 2004	Third place	4	3	0	1	27	3	+24	9
(Fiji) 2008	5th place	5	1	0	4	6	16	-10	3
(New Zealand) 2012	Third place	4	2	0	2	12	5	+7	6
(Papua New Guinea) 2015	Runners-up	5	2	2	1	51	3	+48	8
(Fiji) 2019	Third place	5	4	0	1	13	2	+11	12
(New Zealand) 2023	Semi-finals	4	2	0	2	7	12	–5	6
Total	Runners-up	37	15	3	19	121	90	31	48

== Current Technical Staff ==
Position	
Head coach	(Vanuatu) Etienne Mermer
Assistant coach	(Vanuatu) George Amos
Assistant coach	(Vanuatu) Lauru Wilkins
Goalkeeper coach	(Vanuatu) Jean Yves Galinie
Teamamanger	(Vanuatu) Richard Tatwin
Physiotherapist	(Vanuatu) Daniel Frankem

== Current squad ==
The following players were called to the squad for the 2019 OFC Men's Olympic Qualifying Tournament from 21 September - 5 October 2019.
Caps and goals updated as of 5 October 2019 after the match against Fiji.

No.	Pos.	Player	Date of birth (age)	Caps	Goals	Club
1	GK	Daniel Alick	28 December 1998 (age 27)	4	0	(Vanuatu Football Federation) Erakor Golden Star
19	GK	James Chilia	23 March 2001 (age 25)	1	0	(Vanuatu Football Federation) Tupuji Imere
20	GK	Joshua Willie	13 June 2000 (age 26)	0	0	(Vanuatu Football Federation) ABM Galaxy
2	DF	Jesse Kalopang	1 January 1998 (age 28)	5	1	(Vanuatu Football Federation) Erakor Golden Star
3	DF	Waiwo Kalmet	26 April 1999 (age 27)	0	0	(Vanuatu Football Federation) Tafea
4	DF	Jason Thomas	20 January 1997 (age 29)	5	0	(Vanuatu Football Federation) Erakor Golden Star
5	DF	Joseph Iaruel	25 January 1998 (age 28)	5	0	(Vanuatu Football Federation) ABM Galaxy
6	DF	Tasso Jeffrey	12 August 1998 (age 28)	4	0	(Vanuatu Football Federation) Malampa Revivors
12	DF	Lency Philip	8 June 1997 (age 29)	1	0	(Vanuatu Football Federation) Vaum United
13	DF	Selwyn Vatu	13 June 1998 (age 28)	5	0	(Vanuatu Football Federation) ABM Galaxy
14	DF	Mole Mansale	12 September 1997 (age 29)	0	0	(Vanuatu Football Federation) Tupuji Imere
7	MF	Jordy Tasip	14 July 2000 (age 26)	4	1	(Vanuatu Football Federation) Tafea
8	MF	Claude Aru	25 April 1997 (age 29)	5	1	(Vanuatu Football Federation) Malampa Revivors
10	MF	Bong Kalo	18 January 1997 (age 29)	12	4	(Vanuatu Football Federation) ABM Galaxy
15	MF	Armando Ravo	12 December 2002 (age 23)	1	0	(Vanuatu Football Federation) Malampa Revivors
16	MF	Ronaldo Wilkins	30 December 1999 (age 26)	4	1	(Vanuatu Football Federation) Shepherds United
17	MF	Bethuel Ollie	19 August 1997 (age 29)	4	0	(Vanuatu Football Federation) Vaum United
18	MF	Jasson Tari	2 November 2000 (age 26)	0	0	(Vanuatu Football Federation) Tafea
9	FW	Johnathan Spokeyjack	13 November 1999 (age 27)	5	1	(Vanuatu Football Federation) Ifira Black Bird
11	FW	Azariah Soromon	1 March 1999 (age 27)	5	4	(Vanuatu Football Federation) Tupuji Imere

== Squad for the Four Nation’s Friendship Cup ==
The following players were called to the squad for the 2015 Pacific Games from 3–17 July 2015.
Caps and goals updated as of 10 July 2015 after the match against New Zealand.

No.	Pos.	Player	Date of birth (age)	Caps	Goals	Club
1	GK	Seiloni Iaruel	17 April 1995 (age 31)	13	0	(Vanuatu Football Federation) Amicale
20	GK	Anthony Taiwia	4 September 1994 (age 32)	0	0	(Vanuatu Football Federation) Ifira Black Bird
23	GK	Kaloram Firiam	10 December 1994 (age 31)	0	0	(Vanuatu Football Federation) Tafea
2	DF	Chanel Obed	30 September 1995 (age 31)	9	0	(Vanuatu Football Federation) Amicale
5	DF	Junia Vava	13 September 1993 (age 33)	9	0	(Vanuatu Football Federation) Ifira Black Bird
4	DF	Brian Kaltack (c)	30 September 1993 (age 33)	14	3	(Vanuatu Football Federation) Erakor Golden Star
3	DF	Remy Kalsrap	20 January 1996 (age 30)	9	0	(Vanuatu Football Federation) Erakor Golden Star
6	DF	Raoul Coulon	3 December 1995 (age 30)	9	0	(Vanuatu Football Federation) Tupuji Imere
21	DF	Jais Malsarani	7 March 1994 (age 32)	1	0	(Vanuatu Football Federation) Tafea
22	DF	Kevin Shem	5 December 1993 (age 32)	5	0	(Vanuatu Football Federation) Tafea
7	MF	Barry Mansale	1 November 1995 (age 31)	12	6	(Vanuatu Football Federation) Erakor Golden Star
10	MF	Bong Kalo	18 January 1997 (age 29)	7	1	(Swiss Football Association) Lugano
12	MF	Zica Manuhi	23 July 1993 (age 33)	2	1	(Vanuatu Football Federation) Ifira Black Bird
13	MF	Dalong Damalip	12 May 1993 (age 33)	6	2	(Vanuatu Football Federation) Amicale
14	MF	Michel Coulon	3 December 1995 (age 30)	3	0	(Vanuatu Football Federation) Tupuji Imere
15	MF	Nilua Nicky Nikau	4 March 1993 (age 33)	2	2	(Vanuatu Football Federation) Ifira Black Bird
16	MF	Jacky Ruben	10 November 1996 (age 30)	1	0	(Vanuatu Football Federation) Erakor Golden Star
17	MF	Nemani Rogara	9 June 1993 (age 33)	1	0	(Vanuatu Football Federation) Erakor Golden Star
18	MF	Abraham Rogara	20 July 1994 (age 32)	1	2	(Vanuatu Football Federation) Erakor Golden Star
8	FW	Bill Nicolls	3 June 1993 (age 33)	5	11	(Vanuatu Football Federation) Tupuji Imere
9	FW	Christopher Andrew	2 January 1993 (age 33)	8	3	(Vanuatu Football Federation) Sia-Raga
11	FW	Jean Kaltack	19 August 1994 (age 32)	15	21	(Vanuatu Football Federation) Erakor Golden Star
19	FW	Tony Kaltack	4 March 1996 (age 30)	1	6	(Vanuatu Football Federation) Erakor Golden Star

== List of coaches ==
- (Vanuatu) Richard Iwai (2012–2015)
- (Vanuatu) Etienne Mermer (2019–2022)
- (Vanuatu) George Amos (2022)
- (Brazil) Emerson Alcantara (2022)
- (Vanuatu) Etienne Mermer (2022–)

== See also ==
- Vanuatu national football team
