= Joseph Turagabeci =

Fijian footballer

Joseph Turagabeci (born November 19, 1994) is a Fijian footballer. He represented Fiji in the football competition at the 2016 Summer Olympics.
