= Aaryan Raj =

New Zealand footballer

Personal information
- Full name: Aaryan Raj
- Date of birth: 4 May 2003 (age 23)
- Place of birth: Goa, India
- Height: 1.88 m (6 ft 2 in)
- Positions: Defender; centre-back

Team information
- Current team: Eastern Suburbs AFC
- Number: 5

Youth career
- Eastern Suburbs AFC

Senior career*
Years	Team	Apps	(Gls)
2021–	Eastern Suburbs AFC	104	(7)

International career^{‡}
2022	New Zealand U19	4	(0)
2023	New Zealand U20	5	(0)
2023	New Zealand U23	3	(2)
- * Club domestic league appearances and goals as of 5 June 2026 ‡ National team caps and goals as of 5 June 2026

Aaryan Raj (born 4 May 2003) is a New Zealand footballer who plays as a defender for Eastern Suburbs AFC.

== Early life ==
Raj was born in Goa, India, and holds New Zealand citizenship.

== Club career ==
Raj has played club football for Eastern Suburbs AFC in New Zealand. In 2022, he was one of three Eastern Suburbs players named in New Zealand's squad for the 2022 OFC U-19 Championship.

== International career ==
Raj has represented New Zealand at youth international level.

In September 2022, Raj was named in New Zealand's squad for the 2022 OFC U-19 Championship in Tahiti. New Zealand won the tournament, defeating Fiji 3–0 in the final.

In May 2023, Raj was named in the New Zealand squad for the 2023 FIFA U-20 World Cup in Argentina.

== Style of play ==
Raj primarily plays as a centre-back.

== Honours ==
New Zealand U19

- OFC U-19 Championship: 2022
