= 1999 OFC Men's Olympic Qualifying Tournament =

Tournament details
- Host country: New Zealand
- City: Auckland
- Dates: 13–20 December 1999
- Teams: 5

Final positions
- Champions: New Zealand
- Runners-up: Solomon Islands

Tournament statistics
- Matches played: 13
- Goals scored: 57 (4.38 per match)

The 1999 OFC Men's Olympic Qualifying Tournament took place in December 1999 to determine which Oceania Football Confederation (OFC) member would compete in a play-off against Confederation of African Football (CAF) member to enter the men's football tournament at the 2000 Summer Olympics.

== Group stage ==
=== Group A ===
Pos	Team	Pld	W	D	L	GF	GA	GD	Pts	Qualification
1	Solomon Islands	3	3	0	0	11	1	+10	9	Advance to knockout stage
2	Fiji	3	2	0	1	13	2	+11	6	Advance to knockout stage
3	Samoa	3	1	0	2	5	7	−2	3	
4	Tonga	3	0	0	3	1	20	−19	0	

Source: OFC
11 December 1999

Fiji	4–0	Samoa

Auckland
11 December 1999

Solomon Islands	7–0	Tonga

Auckland
13 December 1999

Fiji	9–0	Tonga

Auckland
13 December 1999

Solomon Islands	2–1	Samoa

Auckland
15 December 1999

Samoa	4–1	Tonga

Auckland
15 December 1999

Solomon Islands	2–0	Fiji

Auckland

=== Group B ===
Pos	Team	Pld	W	D	L	GF	GA	GD	Pts	Qualification
1	New Zealand	2	2	0	0	9	0	+9	6	Advance to knockout stage
2	Papua New Guinea	2	1	0	1	2	5	−3	3	Advance to knockout stage
3	Vanuatu	2	0	0	2	0	6	−6	0	

Source: OFC
12 December 1999

New Zealand	4–0	Vanuatu
Bouckenooghe (?); Hickey (?); J. Murray (?); Urlovic (?)

Auckland
14 December 1999

Papua New Guinea	2–0	Vanuatu

Auckland
16 December 1999

Papua New Guinea	0–5	New Zealand
		C. Banks (?); Campbell (?); Nelsen (?); Rowe (?)

Auckland

== Knockout stage ==
Semi-finals
18 December – Auckland
New Zealand	5
Fiji	2
18 December – Auckland
Solomon Islands	3
Papua New Guinea	1

Final
20 December – Auckland
New Zealand	4
Solomon Islands	1

=== Semi-finals ===
18 December 1999

Solomon Islands	3–1	Papua New Guinea

Auckland
18 December 1999

New Zealand	5–2	Fiji
Bouckenooghe (?); Hickey (?); Nelsen (?); M. Urlovic (?)

Auckland

=== Final ===
The winner advanced to the OFC–CAF play-off.

20 December 1999

New Zealand	4–1	Solomon Islands
Urlovic (?); Scoullar (?)

Auckland
