= Ronaldo Wilkins =

Ni-Vanuatu footballer

Personal information
- Full name: Ronaldo Wilkins
- Date of birth: 30 December 1999 (age 26)
- Place of birth: Tagabe, Port Vila, Vanuatu
- Height: 1.71 m (5 ft 7 in)
- Position: Midfielder

Team information
- Current team: Shepherds United
- Number: 10

Youth career
- 2010–2013: Zimako Football Academy
- 2013–2014: Teouma Academy
- 2015–2016: Wellington Phoenix

Senior career*
Years	Team	Apps	(Gls)
2014–2015	Shepherds United		
2017	Sia-Raga		
2017–	Shepherds United		
2018–	Erakor Golden Star		

International career^{‡}
2014	Vanuatu U15	3	(0)
2015	Vanuatu U17	6	(4)
2016–	Vanuatu U20	8	(3)
2017–	Vanuatu	8	(0)
Medal record
Men's football
Representing Vanuatu
OFC U-20 Championship
Runner-up	2016 Tonga/Vanuatu
Pacific Mini Games
Gold medal – first place	2017 Vanuatu
- * Club domestic league appearances and goals as of 1 July 2017 ‡ National team caps and goals as of 31 July 2019

Ronaldo Wilkins (born 30 December 1999) is a Ni-Vanuatu footballer who plays as a midfielder for Erakor Golden Star in the Port Vila Football League and the Vanuatu national football team.

== Club career ==
Wilkins grew up in Tagabe, an area in Port Vila, the capital of Vanuatu. When he was 6-years-old he start playing at Wan Smol Bag Futsal. After a few years he moved to New Caledonia when he joined the Zimako Football Academy. In 2014 he returned to Vanuatu to start his senior career with Shepherds United. After he had played at the 2014 Summer Youth Olympics he joined the academy of New Zealand professional club Wellington Phoenix. After two years he returned to Vanuatu and went to play for Sia-Raga. On 16 October 2017 it was announced by Vanuatu Football Federation President Lambert Maltock that Wilkins would have a two-week trial at the academy of Brazilian football giants São Paulo. The trial began on 4 November and was arranged by Giovani Fernandez who is a football developer for the Oceania Football Confederation.

== International career ==
=== U17 ===
On 13 January 2015 Wilkins made his debut for the Vanuatu U17 National Team during the 2015 OFC U-17 Championship. He scored 4 goals in 6 matches, being instrumental in Vanuatu's road to the third place in this championship.

=== U20 ===
In September 2016 he played the 2016 OFC U-20 Championship helping Vanuatu to qualify for the 2017 FIFA U-20 World Cup.

=== First Team ===
Wilkins debuted for Vanuatu national football team on 2 December 2017.

== Honours ==
Vanuatu

- Pacific Mini Games: Gold Medalist, 2017

Vanuatu U20

- OFC U-20 Championship: Runner-up, 2016
