= George Ott =

New Zealand association football player

Personal information
- Full name: George Ott
- Date of birth: 22 October 2001 (age 25)
- Place of birth: Auckland, New Zealand
- Position: Striker

Team information
- Current team: Avondale FC
- Number: 9

Youth career
- Lower Hutt City
- Hamilton Wanderers

Senior career*
Years	Team	Apps	(Gls)
2019–2020	Hamilton Wanderers	12	(3)
2020–2021	Wellington Phoenix Reserves	12	(1)
2021–2022	Wellington Phoenix	2	(0)
2022	Melbourne Knights	9	(3)
2023	St Albans Saints	15	(6)
2023–	Avondale FC	34	(8)

International career^{‡}
2023–	New Zealand U-23	2	(2)
- * Club domestic league appearances and goals as of 18 August 2024 ‡ National team caps and goals as of 6 September 2023

George Ott (born 22 October 2001) is a New Zealand professional footballer who plays for NPL Victoria club Avondale FC as a striker.

== Club career ==
He made his professional debut for Wellington Phoenix on 5 January 2022 in a FFA Cup match against A-League Men side Melbourne City FC.

Ott made his A-League Men debut for Wellington Phoenix on 18 March 2022 in a 4–0 away loss against Newcastle Jets. Fellow Wellington Phoenix Academy graduate Jackson Manuel also made his debut in the same match.
