= 2012 OFC Men's Olympic Qualifying Tournament =

Tournament details
- Host country: New Zealand
- City: Taupō
- Dates: 16–25 March 2012
- Teams: 7 (from 1 confederation)
- Venue: 1 (in 1 host city)

Final positions
- Champions: New Zealand
- Runners-up: Fiji
- Third place: Vanuatu
- Fourth place: Papua New Guinea

Tournament statistics
- Matches played: 13
- Goals scored: 63 (4.85 per match)
- Attendance: 4,250 (327 per match)
- Top scorer: (Solomon Islands) Ian Paia (7 goals)
- Best player: (Fiji) Esava Naqeleca

The 2012 OFC Men's Olympic Qualifying Tournament was the qualifying tournament to the football competition at the 2012 Summer Olympics in London for the member nations of the Oceania Football Confederation (OFC). The tournament was played in New Zealand, after an OFC decision to strip Fiji of the rights to host the tournament was made in January 2012. It was announced on 7 February 2012 that Taupō would host the qualifiers, with the sole venue being Owen Delany Park.

New Zealand won the tournament and qualified for the Olympic Games.

== Participating teams ==
- American Samoa
- Fiji
- New Zealand
- Papua New Guinea
- Solomon Islands
- Tonga
- Vanuatu

== Group stage ==
The teams' paths to the Olympics were revealed on 17 February 2012.

=== Group A ===
Team	Pld	W	D	L	GF	GA	GD	Pts
Fiji	3	3	0	0	11	2	+9	9
Vanuatu	3	2	0	1	10	2	+8	6
Solomon Islands	3	1	0	2	16	4	+12	3
American Samoa	3	0	0	3	2	31	−29	0

16 March 2012
12:00 UTC+13

Solomon Islands	0–2	Fiji
	Report	Naqeleca 18'; Watkins 65'

Owen Delany Park, Taupō
Referee: Norbert Hauata (Tahiti)
16 March 2012
14:30 UTC+13

Vanuatu	8–0	American Samoa
Lenga 10', 23'; Tasso 13' (pen.), 21'; Namatak 81', 83', 86'; Mansale 89'	Report

Owen Delany Park, Taupō
Attendance: 200
Referee: Bertrand Billon (New Caledonia)

18 March 2012
14:30 UTC+13

American Samoa	1–7	Fiji
Tualaulelei 66'	Report	Salauneune 12'; Draunibaka 56', 58'; Naqeleca 63', 65'; Drudru 72'; Watkins 88'

Owen Delany Park, Taupō
Attendance: 250
Referee: Isidore Assiene-Ambassa (New Caledonia)
18 March 2012
17:00 UTC+13

Solomon Islands	0–1	Vanuatu
	Report	Kaltack 61'

Owen Delany Park, Taupō
Attendance: 400
Referee: Kader Zitouni (Tahiti)

21 March 2012 (Note: Matches postponed from 20 March 2012 due to extreme weather conditions in Taupō.)
12:00 UTC+13

American Samoa	1–16	Solomon Islands
Luani 5'	Report	Paia 22', 26', 32' (pen.), 58' (pen.), 63', 73', 84'; Donga 50'; Teleda 52'; Lea'alafa 55', 69', 74'; Tafoa 67'; Kakate 77', 79'; Doiwale 89'

Owen Delany Park, Taupō
Attendance: 100
Referee: Bertrand Billon (New Caledonia)
21 March 2012
17:00 UTC+13

Fiji	2–1	Vanuatu
Naqeleca 20'; Salauneune 41'	Report	Kaltack 62'

Owen Delany Park, Taupō
Attendance: 150
Referee: Norbert Hauata (Tahiti)

=== Group B ===
Team	Pld	W	D	L	GF	GA	GD	Pts
New Zealand	2	2	0	0	11	0	+11	6
Papua New Guinea	2	1	0	1	3	1	+2	3
Tonga	2	0	0	2	0	13	−13	0

16 March 2012
17:00 UTC+13

New Zealand	1–0	Papua New Guinea
Lovemore 73'	Report

Owen Delany Park, Taupō
Attendance: 550
Referee: Gerald Oiaka (Solomon Islands)

18 March 2012
12:00 UTC+13

Papua New Guinea	3–0	Tonga
Malagian 6'; Dabinyaba 47'; Seeto 86'	Report

Owen Delany Park, Taupō
Attendance: 150
Referee: Bruce George (Vanuatu)

21 March 2012
14:30 UTC+13

Tonga	0–10	New Zealand
	Report	Draper 23'; Hicks 33'; Saric 43'; Fenton 52', 54'; Gailbraith 72', 73'; Lovemore 77', 90'; Musa 81'

Owen Delany Park, Taupō
Attendance: 200
Referee: Gerald Oiaka (Solomon Islands)

== Knockout stage ==
Due to the delay in the final group matches, the knockout stage was postponed by one day from the original schedule.

Semi finals
23 March – Taupō
Fiji	3
Papua New Guinea	0
23 March – Taupō
New Zealand	3
Vanuatu	2

Final
25 March – Taupō
Fiji	0
New Zealand	1
Third place play-off
25 March – Taupō
Papua New Guinea	0
Vanuatu	1

=== Semi finals ===
23 March 2012
13:00 UTC+13

Fiji	3–0	Papua New Guinea
Naqeleca 25' (pen.), 60' (pen.); Sahib 71'	Report

Owen Delany Park, Taupō
Attendance: 200
Referee: Bertrand Billon (New Caledonia)
23 March 2012
16:00 UTC+13

New Zealand	3–2	Vanuatu
Fenton 5'; Musa 8'; Draper 27'	Report	Kaltack 74'; Tangis 90+1'

Owen Delany Park, Taupō
Attendance: 400
Referee: Kader Zitouni (Tahiti)

=== Third place play-off ===
25 March 2012
13:00 UTC+13

Papua New Guinea	0–1	Vanuatu
	Report	Kaltack 38'

Owen Delany Park, Taupō
Attendance: 400
Referee: Gerald Oiaka (Solomon Islands)

=== Final ===
25 March 2012
16:00 UTC+13

Fiji	0–1	New Zealand
	Report	Draper 18' (pen.)

Owen Delany Park, Taupō
Attendance: 1,250
Referee: Norbert Hauata (Tahiti)

== Awards ==
A number of awards were announced at the conclusion of the tournament.

Player of the tournament	Best goalkeeper	Top scorer	Fairplay Award
(Fiji) Esava Naqeleca	(New Zealand) Jake Gleeson	(Solomon Islands) Ian Paia (7 goals)	Tonga

== Goal scorers ==
7 goals

- (Solomon Islands) Ian Paia

6 goals

- (Fiji) Esava Naqeleca

4 goals

- (Vanuatu) Jean Kaltack

3 goals

- (Solomon Islands) Micah Lea'alafa
- (New Zealand) Greg Draper
- (New Zealand) Louis Fenton
- (New Zealand) Sean Lovemore
- (Vanuatu) Silas Namatak

2 goals

- (Fiji) Archie Watkins
- (Fiji) Jone Salauneune
- (Fiji) Misaele Draunibaka
- (Solomon Islands) Karol Kakate
- (New Zealand) Ethan Gailbraith
- (New Zealand) James Musa
- (Vanuatu) Robert Tasso
- (Vanuatu) Roddy Lenga

1 goal

- (Fiji) Samuela Drudru
- (Fiji) Zibraaz Sahib

1 goal (continued)

- (New Zealand) Daniel Saric
- (New Zealand) Jason Hicks
- (Papua New Guinea) Jamal Seeto
- (Papua New Guinea) Nigel Dabinyaba
- (Papua New Guinea) Vanya Malagian
- (Solomon Islands) Chris Tafoa
- (Solomon Islands) Himson Teleda
- (Solomon Islands) Jerry Donga
- (Solomon Islands) Johan Doiwale
- (American Samoa) Ailoa Tualaulelei
- (American Samoa) Shalom Luani
- (Vanuatu) Kensi Tangis
- (Vanuatu) Barry Mansale

== See also ==
- Football at the 2012 Summer Olympics
- 2012 OFC Women's Pre-Olympic Football Tournament
