= 1996 OFC Men's Olympic Qualifying Tournament =

Tournament details
- Host country: Australia
- City: Adelaide
- Dates: 13–31 January 1996
- Teams: 5

Final positions
- Champions: Australia
- Runners-up: New Zealand
- Third place: Fiji
- Fourth place: Solomon Islands

Tournament statistics
- Matches played: 20
- Goals scored: 89 (4.45 per match)

The 1996 OFC Men's Olympic Qualifying Tournament determined which Oceania Football Confederation (OFC) teams would qualify for playoff to compete at the 1996 Summer Olympics men's football tournament.

== Standings ==
Pos	Team	Pld	W	D	L	GF	GA	GD	Pts	Qualification	(Australia)	(New Zealand)	(Fiji)	(Solomon Islands)	(Vanuatu)
1	Australia (C, H)	8	6	0	2	48	4	+44	18	Advance to play-offs	—	0–1	10–0	7–0	9–1
2	New Zealand	8	6	0	2	28	9	+19	18		0–5	—	1–2	2–0	5–1
3	Fiji	8	3	1	4	12	21	−9	10		0–5	1–3	—	4–0	4–0
4	Solomon Islands	8	2	2	4	6	22	−16	8		2–0 (Note: Australia won the match 4–0 but were penalised for fielding an ineligible player. Solomon Islands were awarded a 2–0 win.)	0–6	1–1	—	2–1
5	Vanuatu	8	1	1	6	5	43	−38	4		0–12	0–10	1–0	1–1	—

Source: RSSSF
(C) Champions; (H) Hosts

== Matches ==
13 January 1996

Fiji	4–0	Solomon Islands

Adelaide
13 January 1996

Australia	9–1	Vanuatu

Adelaide

15 January 1996

Solomon Islands	2–1	Vanuatu

Adelaide
15 January 1996

New Zealand	1–2	Fiji

Adelaide

17 January 1996

Solomon Islands	2–0 (Note: Australia won the match 4–0 but were penalised for fielding an ineligible player. Solomon Islands were awarded a 2–0 win.)	Australia

Adelaide
17 January 1996

Vanuatu	0–10	New Zealand

Adelaide

19 January 1996

New Zealand	2–0	Solomon Islands

Adelaide
19 January 1996

Australia	10–0	Fiji

Adelaide

21 January 1996

Fiji	4–0	Vanuatu

Adelaide
21 January 1996

New Zealand	0–5	Australia

Adelaide

23 January 1996

Vanuatu	1–1	Solomon Islands

Adelaide
23 January 1996

Fiji	1–3	New Zealand

Adelaide

25 January 1996

Solomon Islands	1–1	Fiji

Adelaide
25 January 1996

Vanuatu	0–12	Australia

Adelaide

27 January 1996

New Zealand	5–1	Vanuatu

Adelaide
27 January 1996

Australia	7–0	Solomon Islands

Adelaide

29 January 1996

Solomon Islands	0–6	New Zealand

Adelaide
29 January 1996

Fiji	0–5	Australia

Adelaide

31 January 1996

Vanuatu	1–0	Fiji

Adelaide
31 January 1996

Australia	0–1	New Zealand

Adelaide
