= Fiji national under-23 football team =

Fiji U23
- Nickname: Bula Boys
- Association: Fiji Football Association
- Confederation: OFC (Oceania)
- Head coach: (Wales) Rob Sherman
- Captain: Roy Krishna
- FIFA code: FIJ
First colours	Second colours

First international
- Australia 7–0 Fiji (Melbourne, Australia; 7 November 1991

Biggest win
- Fiji 38–0 Federated States of Micronesia (Port Moresby, Papua New Guinea; 5 July 2015)

Biggest defeat
- Germany 10–0 Fiji (Belo Horizonte, Brazil; 10 August 2016)

Olympic Games
- Appearances: 1 (first in 2016)
- Best result: Group stage (2016)

OFC U23 Championship
- Appearances: 7 (first in 1991)
- Best result: Champions (2015)

The Fiji national under-23 football team, also known as Fiji U23, represents Fiji at U23 tournaments. The team is considered to be the feeder team for the Fiji national football team.

== History ==
Fiji U23 made the maximum of seven appearances so far at the OFC U23 Championship. Their best result was a first place in 2015. They participated at the 2016 Summer Olympics in Brazil for the first time, where they came in last place in their group and only scored one goal.

== Tournament history ==
=== OFC ===
The OFC Men's Olympic Qualifying Tournament is a tournament held once every four years to decide the only qualification spot for Oceania Football Confederation (OFC) and representatives at the Olympic Games.

OFC Men's Olympic Qualifying Tournament
Year	Round	Pld	W	D	L	GF	GA
(Fiji) 1991	Third place	6	1	2	3	3	15
(Australia) 1996	Third place	8	3	1	4	12	21
(New Zealand) 1999	Third place	5	3	0	2	18	7
(Australia) 2004	Group stage	4	3	0	1	12	8
(Fiji) 2008	Third place	5	3	0	2	21	6
(New Zealand) 2012	Runners-up	5	4	0	1	14	3
(Papua New Guinea) 2015	Champions	5	3	2	0	42	2
(Fiji) 2019	Fourth place	5	2	0	3	8	10
(New Zealand) 2023	Runners-up	4	2	0	2	6	12
Total	2nd Place	47	24	5	18	136	84

=== Summer Olympic Games Record ===
Olympic Games record
Year	Result	Position	Pld	W	D	L	GF	GA
1908–1988	See Fiji national team							
1992–2012	did not qualify							
(Brazil) 2016	Group stage	16 of 16	3	0	0	3	1	23
(Japan) 2020	did not qualify							
(France) 2024	to be determined							
(United States) 2028	to be determined							
(Australia) 2032	to be determined							
Total	Group stage	1/7	3	0	0	3	1	23

List of Summer Olympic Games matches
Year	Round	Score	Result	Goalscorer
2016	Group stage	Fiji 0–8 South Korea	Loss	
2016	Group stage	Fiji 1–5 Mexico	Loss	Roy Krishna
2016	Group stage	Fiji 0–10 Germany	Loss	

== Players ==
=== Current squad ===
The following players were called to the squad for the 2019 OFC Men's Olympic Qualifying Tournament from 21 September - 5 October 2019.
Caps and goals updated as of 5 October 2019 after the match against Vanuatu.

No.	Pos.	Player	Date of birth (age)	Caps	Goals	Club
1	GK	Atunaisa Naucukidi	August 3, 1997 (age 29)	1	0	(Fiji Football Association) Ba
20	GK	Mohammed Alam	February 8, 2000 (age 26)	4	0	(New Zealand Football) Manukau United
4	DF	Afraz Ali	June 19, 1998 (age 28)	1	0	(Fiji Football Association) Nadi
8	DF	Joeli Ranitu	April 14, 1999 (age 27)	3	0	(Fiji Football Association) Suva
14	DF	Akeimi Ralulu	March 1, 1998 (age 28)	3	0	(Fiji Football Association) Labasa
15	DF	Arami Manumanubai	November 13, 1998 (age 27)	4	0	(Fiji Football Association) Lautoka
18	DF	Scott Wara	September 22, 1999 (age 27)	5	0	(The Football Association) Stoke City
19	DF	Peni Tuigulagula	March 8, 1999 (age 27)	4	0	(Fiji Football Association) Nadi
2	MF	Muni Shivam Naidu	March 24, 2000 (age 26)	5	0	(Fiji Football Association) Lautoka
3	MF	Inoke Turagalailai	February 4, 2002 (age 24)	0	0	(Fiji Football Association) Rewa
5	MF	Ivan Kumar	June 17, 1997 (age 29)	5	0	(Fiji Football Association) Suva
6	MF	Zainal Ali	October 27, 1998 (age 28)	1	0	(Fiji Football Association) Nadi
7	MF	Rajneil Chand	May 6, 1997 (age 29)	2	0	(New Zealand Football)
9	MF	Mohammed Shah	August 9, 1999 (age 27)	5	1	(New Zealand Football)
12	MF	Kishan Sami	March 13, 2000 (age 26)	5	0	(Fiji Football Association) Ba
13	MF	Savenaca Baledrokadroka	May 20, 1999 (age 27)	5	2	(Fiji Football Association) Rewa
17	MF	Patrick Joseph	May 3, 1998 (age 28)	4	3	(Fiji Football Association) Nadi
10	FW	Bruce Hughes	March 27, 1997 (age 29)	4	1	(Fiji Football Association) Rewa
11	FW	Tito Vodowaqa	April 9, 1999 (age 27)	5	1	(Fiji Football Association) Nadi
16	FW	Sekove Finau	March 16, 1997 (age 29)	4	0	(Fiji Football Association) Lautoka

=== Recent call-ups ===
No.	Pos.	Player	Date of birth (age)	Caps	Goals	Club
	GK	Jovilisi Borisi	October 22, 1997 (age 29)	0	0	(Fiji Football Association) Suva
	GK	Joela Biuvanua	September 4, 1998 (age 28)	0	0	(Fiji Football Association) Rewa
	GK	Asaeli Batikasa	May 30, 2000 (age 26)	0	0	(Fiji Football Association) Labasa
	GK	Viliame Rakuro	June 30, 1997 (age 29)	0	0	(Fiji Football Association) Nasinu
	DF	Isikeli Ratucava	November 6, 1998 (age 28)	0	0	(Fiji Football Association) Nasinu
	DF	Pauliasi Natikibau	October 18, 2000 (age 26)	0	0	(Fiji Football Association) Tavua
	MF	Ilaisa Nayasi	May 16, 1997 (age 29)	0	0	(Fiji Football Association) Labasa
	MF	Shivneel Singh	November 4, 1997 (age 29)	0	0	(Fiji Football Association) Ba
	MF	Marika Rawasoi	January 26, 1998 (age 28)	0	0	(Fiji Football Association) Tavua
	MF	Jeshal Kumar	July 5, 1997 (age 29)	0	0	(Fiji Football Association) Nadi
	MF	Sumeet Goundar	June 6, 1999 (age 27)	0	0	(Fiji Football Association) Tavua
	MF	Cory Sharma	June 22, 1999 (age 27)	0	0	(New Zealand Football)
	MF	Andrew Naidu	December 16, 1997 (age 28)	0	0	(New Zealand Football)
	FW	Ratu Dau	May 6, 2000 (age 26)	0	0	(Fiji Football Association) Ba
	FW	France Catarogo	July 13, 1998 (age 28)	0	0	(Fiji Football Association) Lami
	FW	Semi Matalau	February 17, 2001 (age 25)	0	0	(Fiji Football Association) Nasinu
	FW	James Pillay	December 20, 1997 (age 28)	0	0	(Fiji Football Association) Lautoka

=== Overage players in Olympic Games ===
Competition	Player 1	Player 2	Player 3
2016	Simione Tamanisau (GK)	Alvin Singh (DF)	Roy Krishna (FW)

== 2016 Squad ==
The following players were called to the squad for the 2016 Summer Olympics from 4–20 August 2016.
Caps and goals updated as of 10 August 2016 after the match against Germany.

No.	Pos.	Player	Date of birth (age)	Caps	Goals	Club
1	GK	Simione Tamanisau*	June 5, 1982 (age 44)	3	0	(Fiji Football Association) Rewa
18	GK	Shaneel Naidu	March 28, 1995 (age 31)	0	0	(Fiji Football Association) Ba
2	DF	Praneel Naidu	January 29, 1995 (age 31)	4	0	(Fiji Football Association) Ba
3	DF	Filipe Baravilala	November 25, 1994 (age 31)	8	0	(Fiji Football Association) Suva
4	DF	Jale Dreloa	April 21, 1995 (age 31)	8	0	(Fiji Football Association) Suva
11	DF	Alvin Singh*	June 9, 1988 (age 38)	3	0	(Football Australia) Mt Druitt Town Rangers
17	DF	Kolinio Sivoki	March 10, 1995 (age 31)	5	0	(Fiji Football Association) Lautoka
5	MF	Antonio Tuivuna	March 20, 1995 (age 31)	8	11	(Fiji Football Association) Nadi
7	MF	Nickel Chand	July 28, 1995 (age 31)	9	1	(Fiji Football Association) Suva
10	MF	Joel Shelvin Prasad	February 20, 1997 (age 29)	6	2	(Fiji Football Association) Tavua
12	MF	Tevita Waranaivalu	September 16, 1995 (age 31)	9	1	(Fiji Football Association) Rewa
16	MF	Joseph Turagabeci	April 19, 1994 (age 32)	1	0	(Fiji Football Association) Suva
6	FW	Anish Khem	August 27, 1993 (age 33)	3	0	(Fiji Football Association) Nadi
8	FW	Setareki Hughes	June 8, 1995 (age 31)	3	0	(Fiji Football Association) Suva
9	FW	Roy Krishna*	August 20, 1987 (age 39)	3	1	(New Zealand Football) Wellington Phoenix
13	FW	Iosefo Verevou	January 5, 1996 (age 30)	8	5	(Fiji Football Association) Rewa
14	FW	Samuela Nabenia	February 9, 1995 (age 31)	2	0	(Fiji Football Association) Ba
15	FW	Saula Waqa	October 12, 1995 (age 31)	2	0	(Fiji Football Association) Ba

- Over-aged players

=== Technical staff ===
Position	
Head coach	(Wales) Rob Sherman
Technical Director	(Germany) Timo Jankowski
Manager	(Fiji) Anushil Kumar
Assistant coach	(Fiji) Sunil Kumar
Assistant coach	(Fiji) Marika Rodu
Goalkeeping coach	(Fiji) Simione Tamanisau
Team Director	(Fiji) Tarunesh Reddy
Physiotherapist	(Fiji) Nishant Kumar
Physiotherapist	(Fiji) Varoon Karan
Doctor	(Fiji) Kapil Krishnam Swamy

== List of coaches ==
- (Fiji) Imdad Ali (2012)
- (Australia) Frank Farina (2015-2016)
- (Fiji) Marika Rodu (2019)
- (Wales) Rob Sherman (2023–present)
