= 1991 OFC Men's Olympic Qualifying Tournament =

Tournament details
- Dates: 19 May – 22 November 1991
- Teams: 4

The 1991 OFC Men's Olympic Qualifying Tournament determined which Oceania Football Confederation (OFC) team would qualify for playoff with the 5th place team of the 1992 UEFA European Under-21 Championship to compete at the 1992 Summer Olympics men's football tournament.

== Standings ==
Pos	Team	Pld	W	D	L	GF	GA	GD	Pts	Qualification	Australia	New Zealand	Fiji	Papua New Guinea
1	Australia	6	6	0	0	23	1	+22	12	Advance to OFC–UEFA play-off	—	2–0	4–0	7–0
2	New Zealand	6	3	1	2	12	7	+5	7		1–2	—	4–0	4–3
3	Fiji	6	1	2	3	3	15	−12	4		0–3	0–0	—	1–1
4	Papua New Guinea	6	0	1	5	4	19	−15	1		0–5	1–3	0–2	—

== Matches ==
19 May 1991

Australia	4–0	Papua New Guinea

Melbourne, Australia
22 May 1991

Australia	2–0	New Zealand

Melbourne, Australia
26 May 1991

Australia	7–0	Fiji

Melbourne, Australia
7 November 1991

New Zealand	4–0	Fiji

Suva
9 November 1991

Papua New Guinea	0–2	Fiji

Nausori
11 November 1991

Papua New Guinea	0–5	Australia

Nadi, Fiji
13 November 1991

New Zealand	1–2	Australia

Nadi, Fiji
22 November 1991

Papua New Guinea	1–3	New Zealand

Nadi
16 November 1991

Fiji	0–3	Australia

Nadi, Fiji
18 November 1991

New Zealand	4–2	Papua New Guinea

Lautoka
20 November 1991

Fiji	0–0	New Zealand

Lautoka
22 November 1991

Fiji	1–1	Papua New Guinea

Nadi
