= Real Kakamora F.C. =

Solomon Islands association football club

Real Kakamora
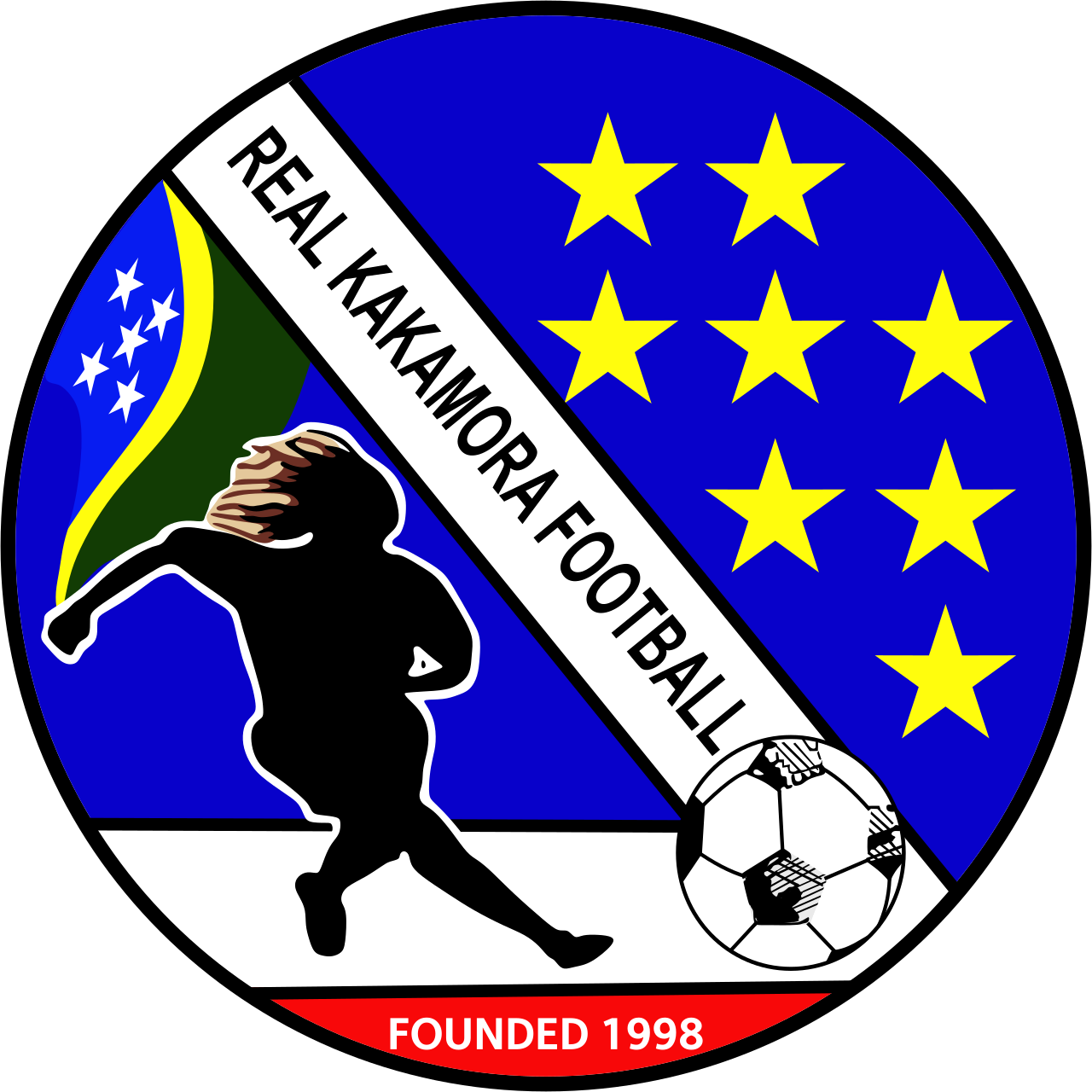
- Full name: Real Kakamora Football Club
- Short name: Real Kaks; RK
- Founded: 1969; 57 years ago (as Kakamora Football Club); 11 February 2011; 15 years ago (as Real Kakamora)
- Ground: Lawson Tama Stadium, Honiara
- Capacity: 20,000
- Coordinates: 9°26′12″S 159°58′17″E
- Owner: Makira-Ulawa Football Association
- President: Tommy Mana
- Manager: Vacant
- League: Telekom S-League
- 2024: Telekom S-League, 3rd of 12
- Website: Club page
Home colours

Real Kakamora Football Club, commonly referred to colloquially as Real Kaks or simply RK, is a professional Solomon Islands football club based in the province of Makira-Ulawa, and play their matches in Honiara. The club last competed in the Telekom S-League, the top flight of football in the Solomon Islands.

Founded in 1969, Kakamora are considered to be the oldest continuously-operating football club in the country, dominating in their early years by winning nine league titles in the then-top-flight Honiara FA League. In 2011, they were one of the eight founding members of the S-League's inaugural season, being selected as last-second replacements after the ownership of Makuru objected to playing in the league on religious grounds.

Since joining the competition, Kakamora's performance has greatly fluctuated depending on their financial condition, recording four top-half finishes but also failing to record a single win in the 2010/11, 2019/20, and 2023 seasons. Despite their newfound popularity and having achieved their best-ever league finish in 2024, the club had their license renewal application denied by the league board without clear explanation, preventing them from playing again until 2028. They share a rivalry with Honiara side Solomon Warriors, who now also are on hiatus as of date.

After failing to win or draw a single match in 2023 while facing significant financial uncertainty, Kakamora launched a social media presence and quickly rose to popularity by drawing attention to the club's story on Instagram. They have since cultivated an international fanbase, becoming one of the most popular clubs in the Oceania Football Confederation after a third-place finish the following season. Their efforts are widely credited with helping provide worldwide interest to football in Solomon Islands and Oceania in general.

== History ==
=== Founding and early success (1969-1997) ===
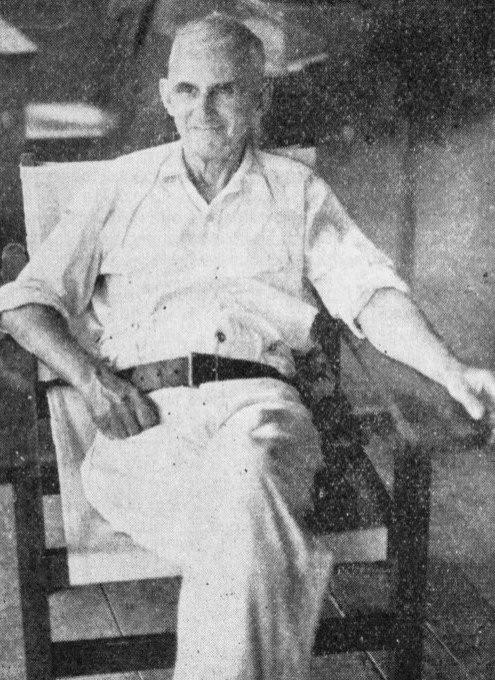
C.E. Fox, who founded Kakamora Football Club in 1969

Real Kakamora's origins go back to when football was introduced to Makira-Ulawa by the officials and missionaries of the Church of Melanesia as part of physical education programs. By the 1950s and 60s, the sport had become incredibly popular within the province, prompting missionary C.E. Fox to found his own club, which he named Flying Fox FC. Like many clubs at the time, they began competing in the top division of the recently-created Honiara FA League, which at the time served as the premier football competition in the Solomon Islands.

In 1968, KAMP United, a club composed of former students from prominent Honiara secondary schools, won the Rothmans HFA Cup, an FA Cup-like competition featuring clubs of all divisions from the Honiara FA League. Following their victory and the conclusion of the league season, members of both Flying Fox and KAMP United approached each other regarding a potential merger of the two sides, and before the start of the 1969 season, Fox finalised an agreement to form Kakamora Football Club. KAMP’s top young players, such as captain John Wheatley and goalkeeper Patteson Seda, joined Kakamora as a result of the merger.

In their very first season, Kakamora topped the Honiara FA League table to win their first title. After missing out on retaining it the following year, Kakamora proceeded to embark on a run of unprecedented dominance, capturing six consecutive league titles from 1971 to 1976. Despite failing to secure a seventh in 1977, they managed to win the HFA Cup, defeating Sunbeam 5-3 in the final. During this time, Kakamora and its players became “household names” in Solomon football, as they were well-regarded for helping popularise the sport in the country and introducing a more modernised style of play to their contemporaries, helping the Solomon Islands earn the nickname of “Brazil of the South Pacific”. Wheatley was named as captain of the national team, while Seda served as its goalkeeper. Other young Kakamora stars, such as Wilson Maelaua, Henry Suri, Nelson Boso, and Donald Bennett also became key contributors for the national team during this period, and were integral to Kakamora's success during the decade.

Kakamora returned to winning form in 1978 and 1979, capturing two more league titles, having won nine out of possible eleven league titles since their inception. Following their league triumph in 1979, Kakamora embarked on a tour of Fiji in August to play against top district sides from the Fiji National League ahead of the South Pacific Games, which were set to be hosted in Suva later that month. In their first matches against international competition, Kakamora largely dominated their Fijian opposition, winning every match but two. They defeated league champions Ba 5-1 on aggregate over two legs, thrashed Nadroga by a score of 7-0, and scored four goals each in victories against Suva, Nadi, and Lautoka. They drew with second-division Tavua 0-0 after an impressive goalkeeping performance, and suffered their only defeat in a narrow 2-1 contest against Labasa.

However, by the start of the 1980s, the rise of clubs such as Honiara Rangers and Sunbeam had loosened Kakamora's grip on the Honiara League. With star players such as Maelaua departing to Australian side Grange Thistle, the team were no longer able to control play as they had the previous decade. Despite their diminished success, Kakamora remained a consistent presence in the competition, placing third in 1985 and 1988, defeating Uncles FC (now known as Solomon Warriors) to win the third-place match in the latter year.

In their first opportunity to win a league title in 15 years, Kakamora suffered a narrow 2-1 defeat to Honiara Police in the 1994 HFA Grand Final. After a fourth-place finish in 1996, the club began to experience difficulties, and were relegated to the second tier for the first time in their history after an underwhelming campaign the following season.

=== Decline and fall to the third tier (1998–2010) ===
Following Kakamora’s relegation, longtime former captain John Wheatley founded the Makira-Ulawa Football Association (MUFA) in 1998, which was responsible for managing and developing the growth of football in the province. The MUFA also established a Makira-Ulawa provincial football team to play in Solomon Cup competitions, which was originally named Real Kakamora to differentiate themselves from the league club. However, the MUFA had no involvement in Kakamora’s football operations during this time.

The team was relegated again to the third division by the start of the 2006 season, and had fared poorly in their few matches against top-division clubs in cup matches, notably losing 9-0 to Marist Fire in the group stage of the 2003 HFA Cup. They performed slightly better under the cup's new format in 2005, but failed to make it to the tournament's second stage. In 2009, the MUFA launched an alternate side named Sokamora, who were composed entirely of Makiran-born players. Sokamora and Kakamora both competed in the third division.

During this time, Kakamora were operated and managed by club legend Wilson Maelaua. Following the announcement from the Solomon Islands Football Federation that a new top-flight national league would be created next season, former MUFA president and current Hekari United assistant coach Tommy Mana approached Maelaua about the provincial federation taking control of the club in order to apply for the new league. Maelaua agreed, and by the start of 2011, the MUFA had become the primary owners of Kakamora. After the end of the 2010 FIFA Club World Cup, Mana left his position at Hekari and was subsequently re-elected as president of the association.

=== The S-League era (2011–2024) ===
The team applied to play in the Telekom S-League in late 2010, but were initially not selected as one of the league's eight founding members in January. Joining two other Honiara-based clubs in a reserve list, Kakamora were only picked in an emergency board meeting as last-minute replacements for Makuru FC, being chosen due to the league's stated objectives of including more clubs based in other provinces. Makuru, whose owners were devout Seventh-day Adventists, were removed by way of improper conduct after refusing to play on Saturdays under any circumstances and threatening to boycott their fixtures in a press statement. The team was rebranded to Real Kakamora in accordance with the name of the provincial team to reflect the club's ownership under the MUFA.

Despite just being re-elected as MUFA president, Mana was appointed as the team's interim coach. Kakamora were forced to assemble a squad within 24 hours in order to be ready to play for the league's first-ever match, which was scheduled for the next afternoon against Malaita Kingz. They struggled in their inaugural campaign as a result, losing their first seven matches. Despite the mid-season transfer of former Hekari defender Cyril Muta from Papua New Guinea side Eastern Stars, Kakamora failed to secure a single win all season, finishing in last place with 2 draws and 12 losses. They then proceeded to exit the post-season S-League Knockout Championship in the first round after losing to league winners Koloale 8-2 on aggregate.

Kakamora's second season in the league saw the club completely overhaul its coaching staff, appointing Peter Konata as the team's first permanent head coach while hiring assistant Sam Wa'aria and tactical analyst Barnabas Loloito to serve alongside him. Aided by the signings of Makiran strikers Nicholas Muri and Johan Doiwale in addition to a breakout campaign from midfielder Paul Hiri, the much-improved squad finished in fourth with seven wins, including a surprise 3-2 victory over defending champions Koloale on 7 December. In August, they narrowly missed out on qualifying for the 2012–13 OFC Champions League through the Knockout Championship, losing to Western United in the semi-finals and defeating Kossa 6-0 in the third-place match.

However, they failed to replicate their success in 2013/14, finishing in last place. In their final match of the season, Kakamora suffered a league record 11-0 defeat to X-Beam, prompting the club to sack Konata and promote assistant coach Wa'aria as his successor. Under Wa'aria, Kakamora returned to strong form in the 2014/15 S-League. They finished the season in fourth place again with seven victories, led by the performances of Hiri and newly-signed striker Tony Otini. They defeated Kossa to reach the semi-finals of the Knockout Championship once again in March but ultimately lost across two legs to Solomon Warriors, ending their 2014–15 OFC Champions League qualification hopes.

The club's next few seasons were defined by coaching upheaval and financial uncertainty. Two matches into the 2015/16 season, Wa'aria unexpectedly stepped down as Kakamora's head coach, citing a desire to take time off from football duties. Former Solomon Islands international Eddie Rukumana was chosen as his replacement. With multiple players departing the squad in the off-season, they finished in seventh place out of nine clubs. After the club only won two of its first eight matches in 2016/17, Rukumana was sacked at the mid-season break as Barnabas Loloito was selected as caretaker for the remainder of the year. Despite minor improvements, Kakamora remained in seventh place. The club confirmed Loloito would not return as head coach after a 4-1 loss to champions Marist on the final matchday, with Hiri scoring Kakamora’s lone goal in the defeat.

Ahead of the 2017/18 S-League, Kakamora surprised football fans by securing the services of former national team legend Batram Suri as head coach, who had just led Vanuatu side Ifira Black Bird to their first Port Vila Premier League title in 31 years. However, not even Suri's expertise could help guide Kakamora's young squad to a better finish, as they placed last in the league for the third time since its inception with only two wins to their name. In a rare bright spot for the squad, 19-year-old winger Adrian Mara made his senior debut for Kakamora and led them in scoring with seven goals. Suri's tenure with the club ended in March after Kakamora were bounced out of the Knockout Championship on 9-1 aggregate to Warriors in the first round, as he was selected by SIFF to lead the U19 national team. The club's rapidly-worsening financial issues came to a head in 2018, with Kakamora unable to find a sponsor until three days prior to the start of the season, nearly preventing them from playing in the league entirely. Wa'aria was re-appointed head coach after he decided to return from his three-year hiatus, being tasked with leading a squad composed of mostly new players. At the season's halfway mark, Kakamora sat in fifth, but the team only won once in its last seven fixtures to finish in seventh place.

By the start of the 2019/20 S-League, Kakamora were virtually devoid of funds and could no longer afford to pay regular wages to its top players. Facing no other available options, the club was forced to loan out most of its starters, sending Mara to Kossa and Paul Hiri to Laugu United on team-friendly financial agreements to avoid collapse. Fielding a squad of inexperienced local footballers with no prior experience in the competition, Kakamora were consistently outmatched from the start, and lost all 15 matches they played.

On the final matchday of the season, Kakamora suffered a league-record 19-0 defeat to second-place Henderson Eels which saw wonderkid Raphael Lea'i score 11 goals while veteran Joses Nawo added a hat trick of his own. They finished the season scoring only seven goals the entire year while conceding 93, making them the third top-flight club in the history of the sport to endure an entire season without recording a single win or draw. The team renewed the contracts of only two players following the end of the season, young goalkeeper Joel Nanago and 19-year-old Sokamora product Carlos Liomasia, whose strong midfield performances in his debut S-League season impressed club management.

Following the disastrous campaign, local philanthropist Robert Chow volunteered to assume management of the team, becoming Kakamora's director of first-team operations. Through his infusion of personal funds, numerous fundraising events, and using his connections to secure over five sponsorships for the club, Chow managed to incredibly stabilise Kakamora's finances in a single off-season. Welcoming back Hiri, Mara, and two others from their loan spells while making close to 20 new signings, the club revamped their squad heading into the 2020/21 S-League, ultimately placing eighth in the newly-expanded 11-club league. Mara led the team in scoring yet again with 11 goals. After the conclusion of the season, the club appointed Henderson Eels manager Chris Asipara to be their new head coach and signed 2020 Solomon Cup golden ball winner Junior Zimri in addition to striker Jaygray Sipakana, the tournament's top scorer.

Kakamora changed their attacking style to better suit Sipakana up top after Mara was sold to Eels for a club-record fee in the off-season. After a slow start to the 2021 S-League which saw the club only win one of its first five matches, Kakamora exploded for a 6-3 victory over Kossa on 11 July that kicked off a run of five matches unbeaten. Sipakana went on a torrid run of form in the second half, setting a Kakamora single-season goals record with 13 and finishing one behind the league's golden boot winner Gagame Feni, including a 4-goal performance in Kakamora's win over Southern United on 11 September. With a 6-0 win over last-place Kula on the final matchday, Kakamora finished in fifth, marking the first time since 2014/15 that the club had finished in the top half of the table. However, tragedy struck the club on 13 February when Chow passed away unexpectedly due to a sudden illness, causing Kakamora's momentum to immediately evaporate. He was posthumously honoured with tributes from players and club executives throughout the league; Chow remains fondly remembered by Kakamora supporters.

Without their top financial backer, Kakamora were once again thrown into a precarious state. In the off-season, over 10 players departed the club, with Sipakana moving overseas to Nadi while Carlos Liomasia signed a contract with NPL Queensland side Peninsula Power. After surprisingly winning their first two matches, Kakamora only won once in their final 20 fixtures of the 22/23 season, which included an 11-0 defeat at the hands of Central Coast on the second-to-last matchday. They ultimately placed 11th out of 12 clubs. In what would prove to be the final season of his historic 12-year tenure as a Kakamora player, Paul Hiri led the struggling side in scoring with six goals.

Losing their remaining sponsors and completely exhausting almost all of their existing resources, Kakamora were again virtually devoid of funds by the start of their 2023 campaign. In the weeks leading up to their opening match, they were forced to part ways with Hiri in addition to head coach Chris Asipara and assistant Sam Wa'aria, unable to pay their wages. Only able to retain five men from an already-weak squad in 22/23, Kakamora were again largely forced to sign inexperienced local players and even attempted to recruit some through Facebook posts.

The club struggled immensely to start the season, unable to record a single win or draw. With morale fracturing, other players began to depart the team, and they were no longer able to hold regular training sessions. In one instance against Waneagu United on 9 September, Kakamora were unable to field a full starting eleven and played the entire match with only nine players.

Having to play their final three matches in the span of a single week, the club suffered 7-0 defeats to Central Coast and newcomers SOSA before losing their final match in a lopsided 14-0 thrashing to Solomon Warriors on 1 October. Warriors' star forward Tigi Molea tallied 10 goals in the match to clinch their eighth S-League title and secure his second golden boot.

Kakamora had finished the season by losing all 22 of their matches, only managing to score 14 goals the entire year while conceding a league-record 116 goals against, giving them the infamous distinction of being the only top-flight club in football history to endure multiple seasons without recording a point. Dating back to the previous year, they had now gone 35 consecutive matches without a win, losing 34 while drawing once. In 18 of those 35 matches, the team had conceded at least five goals. Following the historically-futile display, calls grew from supporters of other clubs for Kakamora to be removed from the league entirely, and with only one season remaining on their league licence, the club was at risk of permanently dissolving.

With Kakamora’s survival in serious jeopardy, a longtime supporter volunteered to make an Instagram account for the club in February 2024. After slow initial growth, Kakamora began to attract global attention after making posts humorously highlighting the team’s struggles. Within a month, they had become the most followed S-League account on the platform.

Spurred by their online success, the MUFA reached an arrangement in March with the management of Honiara Super League club Green Shield that would allow its two executives to become Kakamora’s directors of first-team operations. Using their new source of funds, Kakamora managed to secure the services of 18-year-old Waneagu United winger Paul Francis in addition to standout Central Coast U19 defender Gordon Iro, among others, forming the second-youngest squad in the competition on average. The team was coached by former Waneagu manager Stephen Aumanu and anchored by the signing of veteran Jeffery Bule from Coast in midfield, who served as Kakamora’s captain. By the start of the season, Kakamora had replaced every player from last year's squad while its Instagram page had reached 10 thousand followers, bringing an unprecedented international audience to the club.

Coincidentally, the club’s first match of the 2024 season was scheduled for 28 April against Warriors. With most spectators still expecting Kakamora to lose by multiple goals, the new-look squad narrowly lost 3-2 behind Francis’s brace. Three days later, Kakamora finally ended its 36-match winless run by dominating a 9-man Marist 4-0, their first victory in nearly two years. Incredibly, they went on a club-record five-match winning run, including a 6-0 rout of Henderson Eels on 20 May that brought Kakamora to the top of the table for the first time since joining the S-League. Entering the mid-season international break, Kakamora sat in first ahead of Warriors and Central Coast, although they had three less matches in hand. They strengthened their squad by landing veteran midfielder Joses Nawo from Vanuatu’s ABM Galaxy, but struggled to keep pace with Coast, who remained unbeaten through their first 16 matches.

The club ultimately finished in third, its best-ever finish since joining the S-League. Nearly completing an improbable title run and almost qualifying for the 2025 OFC Champions League, Kakamora firmly established themselves as one of the most popular clubs in Oceania, and won SBD$130,000 in prize money from the SIFF following the end of the season. Francis became Kakamora’s single-season top scorer after finishing with 17 goals, becoming a cult hero amongst the club's new supporters due to his exploits. Alongside teammates Iro and goalkeeper Harold Nauania, he earned his first career call-up to the national team ahead of the 2026 FIFA World Cup qualifiers. The team's social media efforts resulted in all-time highs for viewership and interest in the S-League and Oceanian football, which had long remained under obscurity to most global football fans.

=== Suspension of licence (2025–) ===
Heading into 2025, Kakamora had aspirations of winning their first-ever S-League title. They applied to renew their league licence independently of Green Shield, who had amicably parted ways after executives of both clubs decided to operate again as separate entities. However, after a series of delays, the S-League board denied Kakamora its licence on 2 April, preventing them from participating in the league. Vaguely citing "non-compliance with league requirements" to justify the move, the board denied Kakamora an opportunity to appeal the decision. The club was forced to sell all its players, with multiple opting to play for Green Shield while Francis moved to Nasinu in the Fiji Premier League.

In July, the provincial team captured its first-ever Solomon Cup title, becoming the first team to win the tournament at the new National Stadium as they defeated Malaita 3-0 in the final. Iro and Jeffery Bule returned to the team as designated players, with Bule capturing the golden ball award as the best player in the cup. Ahead of the OFC Professional League launch, it was speculated that newly-founded side Solomon Kings would use Kakamora's branding for the tournament in an attempt to attract global fans, but no announcement was ultimately made.

On 8 March 2026, after Juniper Tree and Waneagu were expelled for failing to pay their registration fees, Kakamora announced their intention to re-apply for the 2026 S-League. They were eventually denied again by the league board, who clarified that no new teams could enter the competition until the current three-year licencing cycle expired, meaning that the club would be unable to rejoin until 2028.

== Club identity ==
=== Name ===
The club's name is derived from the Kakamora, mythical dwarf-like beings from Solomon Islands folklore native to Makira-Ulawa Province. It was also the personal moniker given to the club's founder C.E. Fox due to his short physical stature and his deep integration with the local Arosi villagers. The Spanish honorific prefix Real—traditionally used in Spanish football by clubs such as Real Madrid and Real Betis—was originally adopted by the provincial team to differentiate itself from the league club. It was officially incorporated into the team's title in 2011 after the club was absorbed by the Makira-Ulawa Football Association to reflect its provincial ties, ultimately helping Kakamora secure entry into the S-League.

=== Crests ===
The club did not adopt an official crest until joining the S-League in 2011. The initial design featured a circle with a small black silhouette resembling the club's namesake Kakamora creatures, between two black-and-white stripes reflecting the design of Makira-Ulawa's flag. The first change to this crest occurred in 2022, changing the position of the "Real Kakamora" lettering in addition to relocating the position of the Solomon Islands flag. Upon creating their social media presence in 2024, Kakamora opted for a complete rebrand, creating a new minimalist badge with a vertex-like design around the primary circle. Because this change was made two months prior to the start of the 2024 season and the club did not have the means to manufacture new kits at that point, the crest was never worn on Kakamora shirts. During the rebrand, Kakamora also unveiled several new alternate badges, featuring the center symbol of the club's new crest, a white silhouette based on the one on the old crest, and an "RK" monogram based on the font from the new crest. A planned new kit design featuring the badge for the 2025 season from American manufacturer JerseyBird was announced, but was never supplied after the S-League board denied Kakamora's licence to compete that season. Although this crest was generally well-received by the club's new supporters, it suffered from poor digital legibility when scaled down on smaller screens, even when a white border was applied to the vertex. As a result, the club temporarily unveiled a more visually-pleasing, modernised version of the old crest in June 2026, although it is unclear if it will be used as the primary badge going forward.

=== Colours and kits ===
Despite having a primarily blue crest, Kakamora have consistently worn either a black or white home shirt throughout their 14 seasons in the S-League. The Nike-supplied kit from their inaugural season featured a predominantly white shirt containing jagged black stripes paired with white shorts and socks; it was temporarily replaced the following year by a black shirt with eton blue curved piping alongside the torso and chest. From the 2013/14 to 2015/16 seasons, the club wore a white shirt with black piping along the shoulders and collar, accompanied by black shorts and white socks. This design also marked the first time the club carried a commercial chest sponsor, displaying the logo of local firm Carl's Construction. They have since signed a deal with Our Telekom, the largest telecommunications provider in the country and the league's longtime sponsor.

After switching kit suppliers to BLK in 2016, the club adopted a black home kit with a white diamond pattern across the chest. Starting in 2020/21, they inverted this colour scheme, introducing a white home shirt with a black diamond pattern. Hong Kong-based manufacturer Sunais became their supplier in January 2023 under a league-wide deal with the SIFF, reverting the home kit to black with a new striped hexagonal pattern on the shirt's front panel. To commemorate their management partnership with Green Shield during the 2024 season, the club wore a light green away strip for the first time in its history.

== Grounds ==
=== Lawson Tama Stadium ===
During their first few decades in the Honiara Super League and since the creation of the S-League in 2011, Real Kakamora have played the majority of their matches at the 22,000-capacity Lawson Tama Stadium in Honiara. Due to difficulties financing travel costs between islands, the league instead hosts all its matches at the grounds, effectively centralizing the competition into a single hub so that every club's home and away fixtures can be played there. Opened in 1964, the stadium is notable for its iconic natural spectator stands built directly into grass-covered hillsides in addition to Honiara's picturesque sunsets, creating a unique, open-air viewing experience for supporters. It underwent significant renovations in 2000 after receiving funding from FIFA, with the newly-redeveloped stadium being opened in a ceremony by Manchester United legend Bobby Charlton in 2001. It has since went on to host matches at multiple OFC Champions Leagues, the 2012 OFC Nations Cup, and 2023 Pacific Games. Kakamora contested the inaugural S-League match at the stadium on 12 February 2011, a 2-0 defeat to Malaita Kingz.

=== Planned stadium in Kirakira ===
Through the Makira-Ulawa Football Association, Kakamora are also developing a stadium for their own home province in the capital of Kirakira under the FIFA GOAL Programme. Although the club itself is not expected to play any matches there or host training sessions, it will likely serve as the primary venue for future matches in the Makira Capital League, one of the nine provincial football competitions in the country. An agreement between the Solomon Islands Football Federation and the local government to formalize the project was signed following Kakamora's third-placed finish in October 2024, with construction beginning the following year. It is expected to open by the start of the 2028 season.

=== Training grounds ===
Since 2020, Kakamora have held their training sessions at DC Park, a multi-purpose sporting complex located in the Henderson area of East Honiara, which they share with multiple other clubs in the S-League. The training ground features three full-size pitches with additional floodlights for both football and rugby union activities. On occasion, the grounds have also hosted matches for Kakamora's U19 team in addition to fixtures of the club's reserve side Sokamora in the Honiara Super League and HFA Division One.

== Support ==
Owing to the club's Makiran provincial ties, decades of history playing in Honiara-based competitions, and recent international social media success, Kakamora are one of the most well-supported clubs in Solomon Islands and Oceania. In the 2024 S-League, they recorded the third-highest average attendance out of the twelve participating clubs, only behind rivals Solomon Warriors and eventual champions Central Coast. With over 33 thousand Instagram followers as of July 2026, Kakamora boast the largest social media following out of any Melanesian club and the fourth-largest overall in the OFC behind perennial continental champions Auckland City in addition to New Zealand's A-League sides Auckland FC and Wellington Phoenix. Alongside City, they are one of two teams in the region to have the majority of its social media followers located outside their country of origin; the club states that its worldwide fanbase consists of over 50 supporters' groups with dedicated accounts from more than 15 distinct countries.

In an attempt to help further connect the club's new international fanbase and give supporters a larger say in team operations, Kakamora launched an initiative in February 2025 that would allow any follower of the club's account to apply and become a member without having to pay a fee. The effort was put on hiatus after the club's league licence was denied a month later, attracting over 200 applications in its first week of existence. A paid membership format that required supporters to pay a yearly fee of SBD$250 was previously established as part of the club's 2011 constitution, but was never fully implemented.

== Rivalries ==
=== Solomon Warriors derby ===
Starting in 2024, Kakamora have contested a fierce derby with Solomon Warriors, who are considered to be the most historically-successful club since the inception of the S-League. Following their 14-0 defeat to them the season prior, Kakamora's admin on Instagram began to develop a rivalry between the two sides, jokingly referring to them as "VARriors" in reference to the video assistant referee format and sarcastically claiming their victories to be the result of corruption within the league. Fans began to highlight the stark juxtaposition between the two clubs, with Kakamora serving as a heavy underdog in comparison to Warriors' long stretch of dominance; Warriors had placed within the top three in the table every season in the league's history while Kakamora had yet to do so. Warriors' distinctive red kits, unique "menacing" crest, and established veteran presence with a history of dirty play made the club "an easy target for a villain" in the eyes of Kakamora's new supporters. In their 26 league meetings from 2011 to 2023, Warriors had defeated Kakamora 25 times and drawn once.

Coincidentally, when the 2024 season kicked off on 28 April, Kakamora were drawn with Warriors for their opening campaign. Despite most supporters expecting Warriors to win the match by at least five goals, the revamped Kakamora squad put up a remarkably resilient fight, with Paul Francis scoring a brace in his team debut as they narrowly lost 3-2. The match ended in controversy after Kakamora were not awarded a penalty following a contested challenge in the box in the dying minutes of stoppage time, allowing Warriors to hold onto their lead. Kakamora went on to win 6 of their next 8 matches, putting them in first place for the first time ahead of the upcoming international break.

During the 2024 OFC Nations Cup, a fan impersonating Francis on a Kakamora-related Facebook group had started a hoax claiming that Warriors star Tigi Molea had been arrested in Vanuatu on suspicion of sexually assaulting a 14-year old girl; the post was quickly deleted and harshly condemned by club management. With tensions high in the heat of a title race, the league's two top sides met again that season on 27 July, as Kakamora outshot Warriors and controlled possession but failed to take advantage of chances as the match finished in a 0-0 draw. It was the second time in S-League history that the team had secured a point against Warriors. Kakamora ultimately finished the season in third place for the first time while Warriors finished as runners-up, only a single point in the table behind champions Central Coast. However, prior to the 2025 season, Kakamora's license renewal was denied by the league board while Warriors went on hiatus due to financial issues, preventing both clubs and founding members of the competition from playing in the league. Both are expected to re-apply prior to the 2028 season. Despite the hiatus, the derby is still considered to be one of Oceania's largest and most globally-appealing.

== Media ==
=== Social media presence ===
Kakamora are known for their unique presence on Instagram. Established in February 2024 by a single supporter of the club following their winless campaign the prior year, the account initially rose to prominence through posting Reels about the team's struggles as the self-proclaimed "worst club in the world", attracting 10 thousand followers in its first two months of existence. Following Kakamora's unexpected start to the 2024 season which saw them end their streak of 23 consecutive losses by winning five of their first six matches, it helped cultivate an international fanbase who have rallied around the club's story and sudden change in fortune. By August, they had temporarily overtaken continental giants Auckland City as the most-followed club in an Oceanian domestic league, being surpassed again following City's appearance in the 2025 FIFA Club World Cup. The club has since maintained popularity on the platform through frequent interactions with other club accounts (such as Borussia Dortmund) and its mix of humorous and serious content, developing a rivalry with Solomon Warriors and helping turn top goalscorer Paul Francis into a cult hero. The account has been credited with transforming the club's global reputation and driving interest to the S-League along with other Oceanian football competitions, which have long struggled with a lack of available resources and funding.

Kakamora were notably blocked by prominent Italian football journalist Fabrizio Romano in September 2025 after commenting a sarcastic GIF on a post about Cristiano Ronaldo; they had previously criticised him for using immoral engagement farming tactics after making over 100 posts in a single day following the death of Liverpool star Diogo Jota two months earlier.

The club’s admin has also used their increased platform to bring attention to social issues on and off the pitch; Kakamora were the first club to donate to the people of Vanuatu after the 2024 Port Vila earthquake. In May 2026, they advocated against Vancouver Whitecaps’ potential relocation to Las Vegas, and that July, they became the first Oceanian side to express opposition towards FIFA’s controversial Forward Enterprise proposal that would sell stakes in the World Cup and other competitions to private investors.

As of July 2026, Kakamora currently operate the fourth-most followed account of any Oceanian club and are the most followed team in the region not based in New Zealand:

#	Football club	Country	Followers
1	Auckland City FC	New Zealand	258 thousand
2	Wellington Phoenix	New Zealand	106 thousand
3	Auckland FC	New Zealand	104 thousand
4	Real Kakamora	Solomon Islands	33 thousand
5	Bula FC	Fiji	9 thousand

=== Broadcasting rights ===
Kakamora's matches were first streamed live through the S-League's official Facebook page starting in the 2020/21 season; they have since moved to FIFA+ in July 2022 after the SIFF became the first federation in the OFC to sign a broadcast deal with FIFA, running through the 2026 season. With the exception of a few matches in 2024 that were streamed on Facebook due to a power outage at the Lawson Tama Stadium, most of Kakamora's league matches have been broadcast on the platform.

== Ownership and finances ==
=== Makira-Ulawa Football Association ===
Since joining the S-League in 2011, Real Kakamora have been owned and operated by the Makira-Ulawa Football Association, one of the ten provincial football associations that act as official members of the Solomon Islands Football Federation. They completed a takeover of the side from a previous management team led by former player Wilson Maelaua. Founded in 1998 by longtime club captain John Wheatley, the organisation is dedicated to promoting and developing the sport in Makira-Ulawa Province. In addition to managing the club, the association is also responsible for operating a provincial team for Solomon Cup tournaments, local youth football programs, overseeing regional grassroots development, and the Makira Capital League, the top football competition in the province. After Wheatley's passing in 2001, the presidency was assumed by Tommy Mana, a position that he held until 2005 and again upon returning from Papua New Guinea side Hekari United as an assistant coach in 2011.

Upon the adoption of a club constitution in December 2011, the MUFA had announced their intentions to give a 25 per cent stake in ownership of the club to Makira-Ulawa's provincial government, but were ultimately unable to do so. The team is one of the few remaining clubs in Solomon Islands still operated by a provincial association, with other clubs such as FC Guadalcanal and former S-League champions Western United suspending operations. Having to distribute their finances across multiple separate football responsibilities, the MUFA have struggled to consistently provide adequate funding for Kakamora as a result, forcing the club to be dependent on outside sponsorships as their main source of income.

Mana was most recently re-elected as president of the MUFA in 2025 for another four-year term, which he announced would be his last. Former Kakamora and Central United player Paul Usumae, who served as vice president since 2020, decided not to seek re-election.

=== Financial history ===
Officially registered as a non-profit entity, Kakamora's financial struggles have been a primary reason for the club's poor performance in some of their infamous winless S-League campaigns, preventing the team from affording wages for top players in the country and forcing them to compose squads of inexperienced local footballers. After years of dwindling finances beginning in 2015, the club's participation in the S-League was first jeopardised in 2018 after the team failed to secure a primary sponsor until three days prior to the start of the season. The following year, Kakamora were effectively devoid of funds, having to sell or loan most of its top players to afford to play in the competition, where they lost all of their 15 matches.

The club was temporarily revitalised in 2020 after the MUFA allowed local philanthropist and club supporter Robert Chow to take over as Kakamora's director of football operations. His infusion of personal finances upwards of £3,000 into the side were instrumental in securing the services of key signings such as 2020 Solomon Cup golden boot winner Jaygray Sipakana. After a fifth-placed finish in 2021 that saw the club reach the top half of the table for the first time in seven seasons, Chow died unexpectedly in early 2022 due to a battle with a severe illness. His sudden passing again rendered Kakamora financially unstable, forcing the departures of Sipakana and national team midfielder Carlos Liomasia.

After an 11th-placed finish in 22/23, Kakamora suffered more upheaval and were unable to pay the wages of experienced head coach Chris Asipara and assistant Sam Wa'aria, resulting in them mutually parting ways with the club. The 2023 squad, devoid of funds and again forced to field a squad of local players, failed to even hold consistent training sessions towards the end of the season as they lost all 22 of their matches played. After the season, the entire club was only valued at roughly £5 thousand and were expected to permanently fold by the end of next year.

Kakamora's explosion into a global brand following the establishment of their Instagram page in early 2024 and the club's temporary licence partnership with local side Green Shield helped completely reverse the club's financial fortunes. Making over twenty transfers with other clubs such as Central Coast in the weeks leading up to the season, Kakamora were able to form a squad composed of underlooked youngsters alongside a few established veteran players, forming the second-youngest team in the league and placing third for the first time in their history. Now considered to be one of the most popular clubs in Oceania, Kakamora are estimated to be worth over £100 thousand, making them one of the most valuable football clubs in the country.

== Players ==
=== First-team squad ===
Kakamora's most recent squad for the 2024 Solomon Islands S-League

Note: Flags indicate national team as defined under FIFA eligibility rules; some limited exceptions apply. Players may hold more than one non-FIFA nationality.

No.	Pos.	Nation	Player
1	GK	SOL	John Dora
2	DF	SOL	Junior Houkarawa
3	DF	SOL	Wilfred Mani
4	DF	SOL	Gordon Iro
5	DF	SOL	Zimri Kini
6	DF	SOL	Royal Olavae
7	MF	SOL	Michael Lalo
8	MF	SOL	Jeffery Bule (captain)
9	FW	SOL	Hudson Felani (vice-captain)
10	MF	SOL	Sammy Lalo
11	MF	SOL	Eddie Kasute'e
12	DF	SOL	Innocent Sinahanua

No.	Pos.	Nation	Player
13	DF	SOL	Junior Mani
14	GK	SOL	Harold Nauania
15	MF	SOL	Vincent Liuga
16	FW	SOL	Kieran Israel
17	MF	SOL	Deshaun Kenilorea
20	FW	SOL	Paul Francis
21	MF	SOL	Joses Nawo
22	GK	SOL	John Tolongea
25	MF	SOL	Enock Poloso
26	FW	SOL	Clenty Lamupio
27	FW	SOL	Phillip Ropa
31	FW	SOL	Joseph Firigeni

=== Other players with first-team appearances ===
Note: Flags indicate national team as defined under FIFA eligibility rules; some limited exceptions apply. Players may hold more than one non-FIFA nationality.

No. / Pos. / Nation / Player; 21 / MF / SOL / Ivan Maeluma	No. / Pos. / Nation / Player; 30 / GK / SOL / John Sanga

=== Notable former players ===
The following players gained international caps for their respective countries. Players listed in bold represented their countries while playing for Real Kakamora. This list only contains players who featured for the club after they joined the S-League in 2011.

- (Solomon Islands) Paul Usumae
- (Papua New Guinea) **Cyril Muta**
- (Solomon Islands) **Paul Hiri**
- (Solomon Islands) **Nicholas Muri**
- (Solomon Islands) Leslie Nate
- (Solomon Islands) **Norman Miniti**
- (Solomon Islands) Zantas Kabini
- (Solomon Islands) Alvin Hou
- (Solomon Islands) **Philip Mango**
- (Solomon Islands) **Richard Hiromana**
- (Solomon Islands) **Adrian Mara**
- (Solomon Islands) Javin Wae
- (Solomon Islands) **Carlos Liomasia**
- (Solomon Islands) Jeffery Bule
- (Solomon Islands) **Joses Nawo**
- (Solomon Islands) **Paul Francis**
- (Solomon Islands) **Gordon Iro**
- (Solomon Islands) **Harold Nauania**

== Management and staff ==
=== Coaching staff ===
Kakamora's most recent coaching staff for the 2024 Solomon Islands S-League, who have since resumed their roles with Green Shield

Position	Name
Head coach	(Solomon Islands) Stephen Aumanu
Assistant coach	(Solomon Islands) Ian Lagwai Kalu
Goalkeeping coach	N/A
Director of football operations	(Solomon Islands) Jeremy Bosokuru
Sporting director & operations manager	(Papua New Guinea) Noel Hakopes

=== Executive ===
After the 2025 Makira-Ulawa Football Association board elections

Position	Name
President	(Solomon Islands) Tommy Mana
Vice President	(Solomon Islands) Christopher Rata
General Secretary	(Solomon Islands) Albert Taro
Treasurer	(Solomon Islands) Brian Tara
Other members	(Solomon Islands) Paul Usumae
Other members	(Solomon Islands) Wilson Hoka
Other members	(Solomon Islands) John Mark Ruku
Other members	(Solomon Islands) Gibson Nuhare

=== Managerial history ===
Years	Name
2011	(Solomon Islands) Tommy Mana (interim)
2011-2014	(Solomon Islands) Peter Konata
2014–2015	(Solomon Islands) Sam Wa'aria
2015-2016	(Solomon Islands) Eddie Rukumana
2016	(Solomon Islands) Barnabas Loloito (interim)
2017-2018	(Solomon Islands) Batram Suri
2018-2020	(Solomon Islands) Sam Wa'aria
2020-2021	(Solomon Islands) Peter Konata
2021-2023	(Solomon Islands) Chris Asipara
2023	(Solomon Islands) Barnabas Loloito
2024	(Solomon Islands) Stephen Aumanu

== Reserves and academy ==
=== Sokamora ===
Sokamora Football Club serves as the official reserve side of Real Kakamora. Originally founded in 2009 by the MUFA as a team of all Makiran-born players, they made their debut in the HFA Second Division, replacing the departing Honiara Police club. Initially playing alongside Kakamora in the then-third tier of Solomon football, they became affiliated as a reserve team in 2011 after the MUFA assumed control of Kakamora and entered the club in the Telekom S-League. After finishing atop the Second Division in 2014/15, they were promoted to the HFA First Division and subsequently reached the second-tier HFA Super League following a third-placed finish in 2017/18. After undergoing a financial crisis due to unpaid club prize money and strain from the COVID pandemic, the HFA did not hold a season in 2020/21. When play resumed under a restructured league system in August 2021, Sokamora did not re-enter the competition and have since been on hiatus despite receiving invites from league management in 2022 and 2023. During their initial decade of existence, they have helped produce talents such as Alvin Hou and Carlos Liomasia, who would go on to represent Kakamora's senior team and the Solomon Islands national team.

=== Real Kakamora C ===
After Kakamora joined the inaugural season of the S-League in 2011, their old spot in the Second Division was technically still available once the HFA resumed play in 2014/15, but team management did not pay a registration fee to join because Sokamora were already playing in the competition. Once Sokamora were promoted to the First Division at the end of the season, the MUFA entered a team to participate in the Second Division for 2016 under the club's old name of Kakamora FC, serving as a second reserve team for the club. After struggling in the league in their only season, the side was disbanded the following year due to funding constraints.

=== Youth academy ===
Kakamora launched a U19 side following the S-League's creation of a U19 competition in 2016 to help promote youth development; the league had mandated that all participating clubs in the senior league also field a field a U19 team. In a successful first season under the leadership of first-team assistant coach Barnabas Loloito, Kakamora finished third behind Kossa and league leaders Marist. However, as the club's finances began to dwindle, Kakamora's U19s also struggled, drawing twice and losing eight times in a 10-match 2023 campaign. The U19 side was replaced with a U18 team in July 2024 after the S-League transitioned to operating a U18 competition "in line with the strategic vision" of the Solomon Islands Football Federation, winning their first match in the new age format 3-1 over Juniper Tree. Kakamora's youth sides have also been unable to compete after the S-League board denied the club a licence in early 2025.

== Honours ==
=== League ===
- Solomon Islands S-League (Tier 1)
  - Third place: 2024
- Honiara Super League (formerly Tier 1 until 2000)
  - Champions: 1969, 1971, 1972, 1973, 1974, 1975, 1976, 1978, 1979
  - Runners-up: 1970, 1977, 1994
  - Third place: 1985, 1988

=== Cup ===
==== Domestic ====
- S-League Knockout Championship
  - Third place: 2012
- HFA Cup
  - Champions: 1977

=== Provincial team ===
- Solomon Cup
  - Champions: 2025
  - Runners-up: 2022
  - Third place: 2020
- Solomon Games
  - Champions: 2016

== Records and statistics ==
Due to incomplete data collection from Kakamora's early decades in the Honiara FA Leagues, only statistics from their S-League seasons are presented here.

=== Player ===
- Most seasons played: 11, (Solomon Islands) Paul Hiri (2010/11 to 2022/23)
- Most appearances in a single season: 22, (Solomon Islands) Jeffery Bule, 2024
- Most goals in a season: 17, (Solomon Islands) Paul Francis, 2024 (20 appearances)
- Most goals in a match: 4, (Solomon Islands) Paul Francis v Honiara City, 14 September 2024

=== Team ===
- First League match: v Malaita Kingz, 12 February 2011 (lost 2-0)
- First goalscorer: (Solomon Islands) Peter Kennedy v Solomon Warriors, 27 March 2011
- First win: v. Marist, 6 November 2011 (won 3-2)
- Biggest victory:
  - 7-0 v SOSA, 17 August 2024
- Biggest defeat:
  - 19-0 v Henderson Eels, 25 January 2020
- Most wins in a row: 5 matches; 1 May 2024 – 25 May 2024
- Most losses in a row: 23 matches; 30 April 2023 – 27 April 2024

== See also ==
- List of football club rivalries in Oceania
- List of football clubs in Solomon Islands
- List of winless seasons in football
