= Carlos Liomasia =

Association football and futsal player from the Solomon Islands

Personal information
- Full name: Carlos Liomasia
- Date of birth: 17 September 1994 (age 32)
- Place of birth: Solomon Islands
- Position: Midfielder

Team information
- Current team: Central Coast
- Number: 21

Senior career*
Years	Team	Apps	(Gls)
2016-2019	Sokamora		
2019-2022	Real Kakamora		
2022-2023	Henderson Eels		
2023	Peninsula Power		
2023-2024	Tailevu Naitasiri		
2024-	Central Coast		

International career^{‡}
2022-2024	Solomon Islands	4	(0)
- * Club domestic league appearances and goals as of 7 July 2026 ‡ National team caps and goals as of 7 July 2026

Carlos Liomasia (born 17 September 1994) is a Solomon Islander professional footballer who plays as a midfielder for Central Coast in the Telekom S-League. He represented the Solomon Islands national team in both their FIFA World Cup qualification campaigns for 2022 and 2026.

== Club career ==
Liomasia made his senior debut for Real Kakamora's reserve side Sokamora in 2016 as a 21-year-old, competing in the Honiara Super League, the second division of football in Solomon Islands. After impressing team management, he received a call-up to the senior team for the first time ahead of the 2019/20 season, as the team was dealing with significant funding issues and were forced to loan or sell off most of its key players. He made his debut on 14 September, coming on as a second-half substitute in a 5 nil defeat to Malaita Kingz. His play was considered a bright spot for the struggling squad that had lost all 15 of its matches that season.

In the following season, the return of multiple notable Kakamora players from their loan spells allowed Liomasia to work with a stronger midfield and attacking core. Breaking out as one of the S-League's standout midfielders, Liomasia helped lead Kakamora to an eighth-placed finish in 2020/21 and improved to fifth in 2021. Earning the attention of national team manager Felipe Vera-Arango, Liomasia was called up to the national team for the first time ahead of the Oceanian qualifying tournament for the 2022 FIFA World Cup. He was one of two Kakamora players selected for the squad alongside star striker Jaygray Sipakana, who was unable to make the flight to Qatar after being unable to receive a COVID-19 vaccination on time. After the tournament, he joined nine other Solomon internationals in a trial for Australian club Wynnum Wolves.

Following the unexpected death of Kakamora's team manager Robert Chow, Kakamora struggled again financially and were once more forced to sell many key players. Liomasia departed the club after six years, joining team winger Adrian Mara in a move to Henderson Eels ahead of the 2022/23 season. He attracted the interest of NPL Queensland side Peninsula Power, where he played for a brief stint in 2023 before leaving to join Fijian Premier League side Tailevu Naitasiri. He scored his first goal for the club in a July fixture against Labasa which ended in a 1–1 draw. Despite significant interest from established side Ba, Liomasia stayed at Tailevu for the duration of the season. In his only season for the squad, he played a key role in the midfield and helped lead the team to their best finish since their promotion to the top flight.

He returned home to the S-League in 2024, signing with Central Coast, who finished runners-up the previous season. In his time with the club, Coast won back to back league titles in 2024 and 2025. He made one appearance at the 2025 OFC Champions League, starting in a 7 nil victory over Cook Islands side Tupapa Maeraerenga as the team got eliminated in the group stage.

== International career ==
Liomasia received his first call-up to the national team ahead of the 2022 FIFA World Cup qualifiers, serving as an unused substitute as Solomon Islands went on to lose in the tournament final to New Zealand. He earned his first international cap in a September 2024 friendly against Fiji and would go on to play two matches as a substitute in Solomon Islands' 2026 FIFA World Cup qualification campaign, where the team was eliminated in the group stage. He has not been called up for the national team since.
