= List of Solomon Islands international footballers =

The Solomon Islands national football team represents the country of Solomon Islands in international association football. It is fielded by Solomon Islands Football Federation, the governing body of football in Solomon Islands, and competes as a member of the Oceania Football Confederation (OFC), which encompasses the countries of Oceania. Solomon Islands played their first international match on 30 August 1963 in a 3–1 loss to New Hebrides in Apia.

Solomon Islands have competed in numerous competitions, and all players who have played in at least one international match, either as a member of the starting eleven or as a substitute, are listed below. Each player's details include his playing position while with the team, the number of caps earned and goals scored in all international matches, and details of the first and most recent matches played in. The names are initially ordered by number of caps (in descending order), the by date of debut, then by alphabetical order. All statistics are correct up to and including the match played on 30 March 2022.

== Key ==
Positions key
GK	Goalkeeper
DF	Defender
MF	Midfielder
FW	Forward

Position
Playing positions are listed according to the tactical formations that were employed at the time.
Caps and goals
Caps and goals comprise those in the FIFA World Cup and OFC Nations Cup, Melanesia Cup, their associated qualification matches, as well as Pacific Games and Pacific Mini Games matches and international friendly matches.

== Players ==
Solomon Islands national team football players
Player	Pos.	Caps	Goals	Debut		Last or most recent match		Ref.
Player	Pos.	Caps	Goals	Date	Opponent	Date	Opponent	Ref.
Henry Fa'arodo	FW	64	20	7 July 2002	Tahiti	15 December 2017	Vanuatu	
Benjamin Totori	FW	52	29	25 August 2007	American Samoa	18 July 2019	Fiji	
Hadisi Aengari	DF	43	0	30 July 2011	Vanuatu	30 March 2022	New Zealand	
Nelson Sale Kilifa	DF	37	0	3 April 2004	Vanuatu	5 September 2017	New Zealand	
Joses Nawo	FW	37	7	27 July 2011	Vanuatu	30 March 2022	New Zealand	
Batram Suri	FW	36	15	9 October 1992	Tahiti	6 September 2005	Australia	
Commins Menapi	FW	36	34	21 June 2000	Cook Islands	7 September 2007	Vanuatu	
Gideon Omokirio	DF	32	4	11 May 1996	Tahiti	5 September 2007	New Caledonia	
Stanley Waita	MF	31	5	23 June 2000	Australia	7 September 2007	Vanuatu	
Jack Samani	MF	28	4	13 April 2000	Papua New Guinea	13 July 2007	Papua New Guinea	
Jerry Donga	FW	28	4	24 March 2016	Papua New Guinea	27 March 2022	Papua New Guinea	
Gagame Feni	FW	27	13	11 September 2012	New Zealand	27 March 2022	Papua New Guinea	
Phillip Mango	GK	26	0	24 March 2016	Papua New Guinea	30 March 2022	New Zealand	
Atkin Kaua	MF	26	5	5 October 2016	New Caledonia	30 March 2022	New Zealand	
James Naka	MF	24	3	25 August 2007	American Samoa	5 September 2017	New Zealand	
George Suri	DF	23	1	9 July 2002	New Zealand	3 September 2011	Tuvalu	
Emmanuel Poila	DF	23	3	7 September 2012	Tahiti	18 July 2019	Fiji	
Mahlon Houkarawa	DF	21	1	5 July 2002	Papua New Guinea	7 September 2007	Vanuatu	
Severino Aefi	GK	19	0	11 May 1996	Tahiti	31 May 2004	New Zealand	
Alick Maemae	MF	19	6	3 April 2004	Vanuatu	5 September 2007	New Caledonia	
Micah Lea'alafa	FW	19	6	24 March 2016	Papua New Guinea	30 March 2022	New Zealand	
Jeffery Bule	MF	18	2	27 August 2011	Guam	15 December 2017	Vanuatu	
Saeni Daudau	DF	17	3	17 November 1995	Tahiti	7 July 2002	Tahiti	
Tome Faisi	DF	17	1	3 September 2007	Samoa	16 October 2012	New Caledonia	
Tutizama Tanito	MF	17	4	12 October 2012	New Caledonia	18 July 2019	Fiji	
Noel Berry	MF	15	0	11 July 1992	Tahiti	23 June 2000	Australia	
George Lui	MF	15	0	3 April 2004	Vanuatu	30 July 2011	Vanuatu	
Robert Seni	FW	14	6	11 May 1996	Tahiti	5 July 2003	Tuvalu	
Felix Ray	GK	14	0	10 May 2004	Tonga	8 June 2012	Tahiti	
Judd Molea	MF	14	3	13 July 2007	Papua New Guinea	5 September 2018	Fiji	
Mostyn Beui	MF	14	0	3 September 2007	Samoa	16 October 2012	New Caledonia	
Joe Luwi	FW	14	4	7 July 2011	Vanuatu	26 March 2013	New Zealand	
Fred Hale	GK	13	0	21 June 2000	Cook Islands	7 September 2007	Vanuatu	
Paul Jr Kakai	MF	13	1	1 July 2003	Vanuatu	9 October 2004	Australia	
Leslie Leo	DF	13	1	3 April 2004	Vanuatu	6 September 2005	Australia	
Samson Takayama	DF	13	1	25 August 2007	American Samoa	9 September 2011	New Caledonia	
Freddie Kini	DF	13	0	2 June 2012	Papua New Guinea	13 November 2016	Tahiti	
Michael Boso	DF	13	0	5 October 2016	New Caledonia	18 July 2019	Fiji	
Boni Pride	DF	13	0	2 December 2017	Tonga	18 July 2019	Fiji	
Coleman Maniadalo	MF	12	1	11 May 1996	Tahiti	7 July 2003	Fiji	
Shadrack Ramoni	GK	12	0	7 July 2011	Vanuatu	10 June 2012	New Zealand	
Joachim Waroi	MF	12	0	9 July 2011	Vanuatu	13 June 2017	Papua New Guinea	
Augustine Peli	MF	11	2	11 July 1992	Tahiti	21 June 1997	Tahiti	
Jeff Kwaomae	DF	11	1	17 November 1995	Tahiti	25 June 2000	New Zealand	
Henry Koto	MF	11	1	15 February 1997	Tonga	9 July 2002	New Zealand	
Moses Toata	MF	11	1	15 June 1997	Tahiti	29 May 2004	Vanuatu	
Patterson Daudau	FW	11	5	10 April 2000	Vanuatu	7 July 2002	Tahiti	
Seni Ngava	DF	11	0	7 July 2011	Vanuatu	12 October 2012	New Caledonia	
Richard Hiromana	DF	11	0	25 May 2017	Fiji	5 September 2018	Fiji	
George Kiriau	MF	10	2	4 September 1992	Australia	21 June 1997	Tahiti	
Abraham Iniga	MF	10	1	6 September 2005	Australia	10 June 2012	New Zealand	
Allen Peter	DF	10	1	24 March 2016	Papua New Guinea	18 July 2019	Fiji	
Dudley Natei	FW	9	6	3 November 1990	Vanuatu	9 October 1992	Tahiti	
Jimmy Kaierea	DF	9	0	15 February 1997	Tonga	11 June 2001	New Zealand	
Francis Wasi	MF	9	0	21 June 2000	Cook Islands	6 September 2005	Australia	
Martin Ruhasia	DF	9	0	5 July 2002	Papua New Guinea	10 May 2004	Tonga	
Leslie Nate	MF	9	0	2 June 2012	Papua New Guinea	16 October 2012	New Caledonia	
John Tanisapa	DF	8	0	11 July 1992	Tahiti	18 September 1996	Vanuatu	
Timothy Inifiri	DF	8	0	17 November 1995	Tahiti	21 June 1997	Tahiti	
Selson Molea	DF	8	0	11 June 1997	Australia	7 July 2003	Fiji	
Robert Laua	DF	8	0	25 May 2017	Fiji	5 September 2018	Fiji	
Alwin Hou	MF	8	5	29 August 2018	Macau	30 March 2022	New Zealand	
Eddie Rukumana	MF	7	2	11 May 1996	Tahiti	17 June 1997	Australia	
Danny Wabo	FW	7	1	11 May 1996	Tahiti	21 June 1997	Tahiti	
Vivian Wickham	MF	7	2	4 June 2001	Cook Islands	9 July 2002	New Zealand	
Samson Koti	GK	7	0	7 September 2012	Tahiti	31 May 2016	Fiji	
Andrew Abba	FW	7	5	23 March 2013	Tahiti	18 July 2019	Fiji	
Gibson Daudau	MF	7	0	27 March 2016	Papua New Guinea	13 November 2016	Tahiti	
Clifton Aumae	MF	7	0	1 September 2017	New Zealand	5 December 2017	Vanuatu	
Charles Ashley	MF	6	0	17 September 1991	New Caledonia	17 November 1995	Tahiti	
Matai Vave	MF	6	0	11 July 1992	Tahiti	18 September 1996	Vanuatu	
Timothy Paoka	MF	6	0	21 June 2000	Cook Islands	9 July 2002	New Zealand	
Joel Konofilia	MF	6	1	4 June 2001	Cook Islands	12 October 2004	Australia	
Richard Ruakome	MF	6	0	5 July 2002	Papua New Guinea	7 July 2003	Fiji	
Godwin Bebeu	FW	6	2	13 July 2007	Papua New Guinea	7 September 2007	Vanuatu	
David Taro	DF	6	0	25 August 2007	American Samoa	7 September 2007	Vanuatu	
Ian Paia	FW	6	1	9 July 2011	Vanuatu	7 September 2012	Tahiti	
Jack Wetney	MF	6	0	9 July 2011	Vanuatu	7 September 2012	Tahiti	
Dennis Ifunaoa	FW	6	5	27 March 2016	Papua New Guinea	18 July 2019	Fiji	
Adrian Mara	FW	6	4	2 December 2017	Tonga	30 March 2022	New Zealand	
Desmond Tutu	GK	6	0	2 December 2017	Tonga	12 July 2019	Tahiti	
Hollies Vato	FW	5	2	11 July 1992	Tahiti	11 May 1996	Tahiti	
Willie Omokirio	MF	5	0	26 September 1992	Australia	7 July 2003	Fiji	
David Firisua	MF	5	1	4 June 2001	Cook Islands	9 July 2002	New Zealand	
Moffat Kilifa	DF	5	0	24 March 2016	Papua New Guinea	13 November 2016	Tahiti	
Timothy Bakale	MF	5	0	25 May 2017	Fiji	29 August 2018	Macau	
Joseph Batai	GK	4	0	11 July 1992	Tahiti	17 November 1995	Tahiti	
Richard Gulu	DF	4	0	11 July 1992	Tahiti	9 October 1992	Tahiti	
Robert Suri	FW	4	0	11 July 1992	Tahiti	9 October 1992	Tahiti	
Solomon Vevoa	DF	4	0	11 July 1992	Tahiti	9 October 1992	Tahiti	
Jerry Allen	MF	4	0	11 June 2001	New Zealand	7 May 2003	Tuvalu	
Timothy Joe	DF	4	0	30 August 2011	American Samoa	9 September 2011	New Caledonia	
Loni Qaraba	DF	4	0	4 June 2012	Fiji	16 October 2012	New Caledonia	
George Aba	MF	4	0	13 July 2007	Papua New Guinea	7 September 2007	Vanuatu	
Himson Teleda	MF	4	0	10 June 2012	New Zealand	26 March 2013	New Zealand	
Fred Fakari	DF	4	0	24 March 2016	Papua New Guinea	8 June 2016	Papua New Guinea	
Leon Kofana	DF	4	0	17 March 2022	Cook Islands	30 March 2022	New Zealand	
Iani Lagwai Kalu	DF	4	0	17 March 2022	Cook Islands	30 March 2022	New Zealand	
Raphael Lea'i	FW	4	4	17 March 2022	Cook Islands	30 March 2022	New Zealand	
Prince Tahunipue	DF	4	0	17 March 2022	Cook Islands	30 March 2022	New Zealand	
Danny Waeta'a	MF	3	1	17 September 1992	New Caledonia	26 September 1992	Australia	
Ian Pwaholo	FW	3	0	4 September 1992	Australia	9 October 1992	Tahiti	
Cliff Sasau	MF	3	0	11 June 1997	Australia	21 June 1997	Tahiti	
Aleck Wickham	DF	3	0	27 July 2011	Vanuatu	10 June 1997	New Zealand	
Michael Fifi'i	FW	3	0	30 July 2011	Vanuatu	23 March 2013	Tahiti	
Paul Hiri	MF	3	0	12 October 2012	New Caledonia	26 March 2013	New Zealand	
Charlie Otainao	MF	3	0	27 March 2016	Papua New Guinea	8 October 2016	New Caledonia	
Molea Tigi	MF	3	0	5 October 2016	New Caledonia	25 May 2017	Fiji	
Izomo Bird	GK	3	0	8 October 2016	New Caledonia	28 May 2017	Fiji	
Obed Ofea	MF	3	0	25 May 2017	Fiji	9 June 2017	Papua New Guinea	
Raynick Laeta	FW	3	0	8 July 2019	Tuvalu	18 July 2019	Fiji	
John Aeta	DF	3	0	12 July 2019	Tahiti	18 July 2019	Fiji	
William Komasi	MF	3	0	17 March 2022	Cook Islands	27 March 2022	Papua New Guinea	
Samson Gamasi	DF	2	0	11 July 1992	Tahiti	11 July 1992	Tahiti	
Robert Hicks	DF	2	0	4 September 1992	Australia	26 September 1992	Australia	
Lucian Sikua'ae	GK	2	0	9 October 1992	Tahiti	3 April 2004	Vanuatu	
Chris Moli	MF	2	0	16 September 1996	Papua New Guinea	18 September 1996	Vanuatu	
Andrew Sala-Rockson	FW	2	0	1 March 1997	Tonga	11 June 1997	Australia	
Sikele Buga	MF	2	0	15 June 1997	Tahiti	17 June 1997	Australia	
Peter Mautoa	GK	2	0	17 June 1997	Australia	21 June 1997	Tahiti	
Humphrey Dei	DF	2	0	21 June 2000	Cook Islands	23 June 2000	Australia	
Mark Mehau	FW	2	2	14 June 2003	Papua New Guinea	3 July 2003	Kiribati	
Philip Kaukui		2	0	3 April 2004	Vanuatu	6 April 2004	Vanuatu	
Francis Aruwafu	GK	2	0	19 May 2004	Tahiti	3 September 2005	Australia	
Kidston Billy	FW	2	0	12 October 2004	Australia	3 September 2005	Australia	
Richard Anisua	DF	2	0	3 September 2005	Australia	6 September 2005	Australia	
Joe Manu	MF	2	0	30 August 2011	American Samoa	5 September 2011	New Caledonia	
Nicholas Muri	FW	2	0	4 June 2012	Fiji	10 June 2012	New Zealand	
Joshua Tuasulia	DF	2	0	8 June 2012	New Zealand	10 June 2012	New Zealand	
Bata Furai	DF	2	0	31 May 2016	Fiji	4 June 2016	New Zealand	
Junior Albert	DF	2	0	8 October 2016	New Caledonia	2 December 2017	Tonga	
Zantas Kabini	GK	2	0	8 November 2016	Tahiti	9 December 2017	Tuvalu	
Don Keana	FW	2	0	17 March 2022	Cook Islands	30 March 2022	New Zealand	
Mohammad Ali Mekawir	FW	2	0	17 March 2022	Cook Islands	30 March 2022	New Zealand	
Javin Alick	DF	2	0	24 March 2022	Tahiti	27 March 2022	Papua New Guinea	
Patrick Waku		1	0	20 September 1991	Fiji	20 September 1991	Fiji	
Medley Toatu		1	1	27 July 1992	Vanuatu	27 July 1992	Vanuatu	
Johnston Tome		1	1	27 July 1992	Vanuatu	27 July 1992	Vanuatu	
Robinson Seni Boe		1	0	4 September 1992	Australia	4 September 1992	Australia	
Steven Abana	FW	1	0	17 November 1995	Tahiti	17 November 1995	Tahiti	
Wale Diu	FW	1	0	17 November 1995	Tahiti	17 November 1995	Tahiti	
Beuka Wali	FW	1	0	17 November 1995	Tahiti	17 November 1995	Tahiti	
Richard Bobby	FW	1	0	11 May 1996	Tahiti	11 May 1996	Tahiti	
Jacob Moli	MF	1	0	16 September 1996	Papua New Guinea	16 September 1996	Papua New Guinea	
Noel Bako	FW	1	0	15 February 1997	Tonga	15 February 1997	Tonga	
Jason Limae	MF	1	0	15 February 1997	Tonga	15 February 1997	Tonga	
Richard Fugui	MF	1	0	1 March 1997	Tonga	1 March 1997	Tonga	
Jason Damuri	MF	1	0	21 June 1997	Tahiti	21 June 1997	Tahiti	
Eddie Edwin	DF	1	0	13 June 2001	Tahiti	13 June 2001	Tahiti	
Robert Firigeni		1	0	3 April 2004	Vanuatu	3 April 2004	Vanuatu	
Tinoni Ratu	FW	1	0	13 July 2007	Papua New Guinea	13 July 2007	Papua New Guinea	
Carrol Kakate	FW	1	0	9 July 2011	Vanuatu	9 July 2011	Vanuatu	
Jimmy Qwaina	GK	1	0	9 July 2011	Vanuatu	9 July 2011	Vanuatu	
Willie Lamani	DF	1	0	16 October 2012	New Caledonia	16 October 2012	New Caledonia	
Paul Huia	GK	1	0	11 September 2012	New Zealand	11 September 2012	New Zealand	
Calvin Erick	DF	1	0	23 March 2013	Tahiti	23 March 2013	Tahiti	
Tony Havea	MF	1	0	23 March 2013	Tahiti	23 March 2013	Tahiti	
George Lagoda	DF	1	0	23 March 2013	Tahiti	23 March 2013	Tahiti	
Andrew Maeribu	DF	1	0	23 March 2013	Tahiti	23 March 2013	Tahiti	
Wesley Keni Olea	MF	1	0	23 March 2013	Tahiti	23 March 2013	Tahiti	
Sammy Osso	GK	1	0	23 March 2013	Tahiti	23 March 2013	Tahiti	
Stewart Quan	DF	1	0	23 March 2013	Tahiti	23 March 2013	Tahiti	
Joachim Rande	FW	1	0	23 March 2013	Tahiti	23 March 2013	Tahiti	
Alex Waimra	FW	1	0	23 March 2013	Tahiti	23 March 2013	Tahiti	
Arnold Keni	MF	1	0	26 March 2013	New Zealand	26 March 2013	New Zealand	
Adik Maeta	DF	1	0	26 March 2013	New Zealand	26 March 2013	New Zealand	
David Naitoro	MF	1	0	26 March 2013	New Zealand	26 March 2013	New Zealand	
Leonard Rokoto	MF	1	0	26 March 2013	New Zealand	26 March 2013	New Zealand	
George Wagena	MF	1	0	26 March 2013	New Zealand	26 March 2013	New Zealand	
Clifford Wate	DF	1	0	26 March 2013	New Zealand	26 March 2013	New Zealand	
Mathias Iani	MF	1	0	8 October 2016	New Caledonia	8 October 2016	New Caledonia	
Michael Sira	DF	1	0	13 November 2016	Tahiti	13 November 2016	Tahiti	
Norman Miniti	MF	1	0	9 December 2017	Tuvalu	9 December 2017	Tuvalu	
Atana Fa'arodo	FW	1	0	29 August 2018	Macau	29 August 2018	Macau	
Timothy Mae'arasia	GK	1	0	15 July 2019	American Samoa	15 July 2019	American Samoa	
Andrew Rarangia	DF	1	0	15 July 2019	American Samoa	15 July 2019	American Samoa	
Patrick Taroga	MF	1	0	15 July 2019	American Samoa	15 July 2019	American Samoa	
Molis Gagame	MF	1	0	30 March 2022	New Zealand	30 March 2022	New Zealand	
David Supa	MF	1	0	30 March 2022	New Zealand	30 March 2022	New Zealand	
