= List of association football clubs in Solomon Islands =

This is a list of association football clubs in Solomon Islands.

== Teams ==
=== Current ===
- Avaiki Chiefs Warriors
- Central Coast (Honiara)
- Hana F.C.
- Henderson Eels (Honiara)
- Honiara City F.C.
- Honiara Rangers F.C.
- Isabel United F.C.
- Junior Flamingo FC
- K1 United
- Katova FC
- Kohohale FC
- Koloale F.C.
- Kossa F.C.
- Kula F.C.
- Laugu United F.C. (Honiara)
- Malaita Kingz F.C.
- Marist F.C.
- Northern Warriors FC
- Paratasi FC
- Real Kakamora F.C.
- Solomon Warriors F.C.
- Southern United F.C. (Honiara)
- Sunbeam FC
- Waneagu United
- Western United FC
- Zome Mars FC

=== Formerly ===
- HPF FC
- Laugu United FC
