= 2018 Solomon Islands S-League =

Telekom S-League
- Season: 2018
- Champions: Solomon Warriors
- Matches: 56
- Goals: 252 (4.5 per match)
- Top goalscorer: (Vanuatu) Kensi Tangis (23 goals)

The 2018 Telekom S-League is the 15th season of the Telekom S-League, the top football league in the Solomon Islands.

The league was originally to kick off on 21 July 2018, but was delayed until 5 August. A total of eight teams have confirmed their participation.

== League table ==
Pos	Team	Pld	W	D	L	GF	GA	GD	Pts	Qualification or relegation
1	Solomon Warriors	14	9	3	2	49	15	+34	30	Qualification to 2019 OFC Champions League
2	Henderson Eels	14	9	3	2	48	22	+26	30	Qualification to 2019 OFC Champions League
3	Kossa	14	6	5	3	30	22	+8	23	
4	Malaita Kingz	14	6	3	5	28	27	+1	21	
5	Western United	14	6	1	7	29	31	−2	19	
6	Marist	14	5	2	7	27	31	−4	17	
7	Real Kakamora	14	4	4	6	27	40	−13	16	
8	FC Guadalcanal	14	0	1	13	14	64	−50	1	

== Top scorers ==
Rank	Player	Team	Goals
1	(Vanuatu) Kensi Tangis	Solomon Warriors	23
2	(Solomon Islands) Coleman Makau	Western United	12
3	(Solomon Islands) Adrian Mara	Real Kakamora	11
3	(Solomon Islands) Joses Nawo	Henderson Eels	11
3	(Solomon Islands) Molea Tigi	Solomon Warriors	11
3	(Solomon Islands) Tuti Tanito	Henderson Eels	11
7	(Solomon Islands) Paul Wale	Kossa	10
8	(Solomon Islands) Lore Fonaota	Malaita Kingz	8
9	(Solomon Islands) Muffat Kilifa	Western United	7
10	(Solomon Islands) Jerry Donga	Solomon Warriors	6
10	(Papua New Guinea) Emmanuel Simon	Malaita Kingz	6
10	(Solomon Islands) Patrick Taroga	Marist	6

== Multiple hat-tricks ==
Player	For	Against	Score	Date
(Solomon Islands) Boni Pride	HendersonEels	Real Kakamora	1-8	11 August 2018
(Solomon Islands) Clement Baegoni	Henderson Eels	Real Kakamora	1-8	11 August 2018
(Solomon Islands) Molea Tigi	Solomon Warriors	Real Kakamora	9-2	29 September 2018
(Vanuatu) Kensi Tangis	Solomon Warriors	Real Kakamora	9-2	29 September 2018
(Solomon Islands) Jerry Donga	Solomon Warriors	Real Kakamora	9-2	29 September 2018
(Solomon Islands) Muffat Deramoa	Kossa	Marist	2-3	29 September 2018
(Solomon Islands) Coleman Makau	Western United	Kossa	2-3	6 October 2018
(Vanuatu) Kensi Tangis^{5}	Solomon Warriors	Guadalcanal	7-1	13 October 2018
(Vanuatu) Kensi Tangis	Solomon Warriors	Western United	0-4	27 October 2018
(Solomon Islands) Joachim Kairi	Kossa	Guadalcanal	0-6	28 October 2018
(Solomon Islands) Adrian Mara	Real Kakamora	Guadalcanal	4-2	4 November 2018
(Solomon Islands) Leslie Ramo	Marist	Guadalcanal	7-2	1 December 2018
(Solomon Islands) Joses Nawo	Henderson Eels	Marist	6-2	1 December 2018
(Vanuatu) Kensi Tangis^{5}	Solomon Warriors	Guadalcanal	1-10	1 December 2018
(Solomon Islands) Molea Tigi	Solomon Warriors	Guadalcanal	1-10	1 December 2018
