= 2019–20 Solomon Islands S-League =

Telekom S-League
- Season: 2019–20
- Champions: Solomon Warriors
- OFC Champions League: Solomon Warriors; Henderson Eels
- Matches: 72
- Goals: 364 (5.06 per match)
- Top goalscorer: (Solomon Islands) Raphael Lea'i (24 goals)

The 2019–20 Telekom S-League is the 16th season of the Telekom S-League, the top football league in the Solomon Islands.

The league kicked off on 14 September 2019. and finished on 29 January 2020. It was originally scheduled to finish in December 2019 but it was postponed. After many discussions the final matches were played on late January, with the exception of a fixture between bottom-table sides Real Kakamora and FC Guadalcanal. The match was never held, and the league never announced if it was awarded as a draw.

Solomon Warriors were crowned as the league champions after defeating Guadalcanal by default in the last gameweek.

== Teams ==
Nine teams played the 2019–20 season, an increase from eight in the 2018 season. Western United from the previous season did not enter, and were replaced by Isabel United and Laugu United.

- FC Guadalcanal (Honiara)
- Henderson Eels (Honiara)
- Isabel United (Isabel Province)
- Kossa (Honiara)
- Laugu United (Honiara)
- Malaita Kingz (Malaita)
- Marist (Honiara)
- Real Kakamora (Makira-Ulawa)
- Solomon Warriors (Honiara)

== Title Race ==
Solomon Warriors and Henderson Eels starred in the title race. Henderson Eels arrived to the last matchweek needing to beat bottom placed team Real Kakamora by 13 or more goals and cheer for a Solomon Warriors loss against FC Guadalcanal.

Eels won Real Kakamora by 19–0 with eleven goals scored by Raphael Lea'i but Solomon Warriors won Guadalcanal by default to remain with the national league title.

== League table ==
Pos	Team	Pld	W	D	L	GF	GA	GD	Pts	Qualification or relegation
1	Solomon Warriors (C, Q)	16	13	2	1	70	14	+56	41	Qualification to OFC Champions League group stage (Note: Since the league was not finished at the end of 2019, Solomon Warriors and Henderson Eels, which were both assured of a top two finish and thus had qualified for the 2020 OFC Champions League at that time, were placed in the group stage following their ranking at the end of 2019. The league continued in 2020, and Solomon Warriors and Henderson Eels eventually finished in the same positions as champions and runners-up respectively.)
2	Henderson Eels (Q)	16	12	2	2	78	19	+59	38	Qualification to OFC Champions League group stage
3	Kossa	16	10	2	4	53	25	+28	32	
4	Isabel United	16	10	1	5	48	28	+20	31	
5	Malaita Kingz	16	8	0	8	39	37	+2	24	
6	Laugu United	16	5	3	8	31	29	+2	18	
7	Marist	16	4	5	7	23	37	−14	17	
8	FC Guadalcanal	15	1	1	13	15	82	−67	4	
9	Real Kakamora	15	0	0	15	7	93	−86	0	

Source: , SIFF, Soccerway
(C) Champions; (Q) Qualified for the phase indicated

== Top scorers ==
Rank	Player	Club	Goals
1	(Solomon Islands) Raphael Lea'i	Henderson Eels	24
2	(Vanuatu) Tony Kaltak	Solomon Warriors	19
3	(Solomon Islands) Harrison Mala	Kossa	15
4	(Solomon Islands) Edward Huniuehu	Malaita Kingz	13
5	(Solomon Islands) Atkin Kaua	Laugu United	11
5	(Solomon Islands) Joses Nawo	Henderson Eels	11
7	(Solomon Islands) Bently Kelobi	Isabel United	10
7	(Solomon Islands) Lore Fonaota	Kossa	10
7	(Solomon Islands) Tuti Tanito	Henderson Eels	10
10	Emmanuel Simon	Malaita Kingz	8

== Hat-tricks ==
Player	For	Against	Score	Date
(Papua New Guinea) Emmanuel Simon	Malaita Kingz	Real Kakamora	0–5	14 September 2019
(Vanuatu) Tony Kaltack^{4}	Solomon Warriors	Isabel United	5–3	22 September 2019
(Solomon Islands) Harrison Mala	Kossa	Guadalcanal	1–5	28 September 2019
(Solomon Islands) Edward Huniuehu	Malaita Kingz	Guadalcanal	0–4	13 October 2019
(Solomon Islands) Molea Tigi^{5}	Solomon Warriors	Real Kakamora	0–11	16 October 2019
(Solomon Islands) Bently Kelobi	Isabel United	Marist	4–2	16 October 2019
(Solomon Islands) Lore Fonaota	Kossa	Malaita Kingz	1–3	19 October 2019
(Solomon Islands) Bently Kelobi^{4}	Isabel United	Guadalcanal	8–0	19 October 2019
(Solomon Islands) Atkin Kaua^{4}	Laugu United	Real Kakamora	2–5	20 October 2019
(Solomon Islands) Jerry Donga	Solomon Warriors	Laugu United	0–5	26 October 2019
(Solomon Islands) Edward Huniuehu^{4}	Malaita Kingz	Real Kakamora	6–0	9 November 2019
(Solomon Islands) Raphael Lea'i^{4}	Henderson Eels	Guadalcanal	7–1	20 November 2019
(Solomon Islands) Raphael Lea'i^{4}	Henderson Eels	Malaita Kingz	2–9	26 November 2019
(Vanuatu) Tony Kaltack^{4}	Solomon Warriors	Real Kakamora	8–0	30 November 2019
(Solomon Islands) Harrison Mala^{4}	Kossa	Real Kakamora	9–1	11 December 2019
(Solomon Islands) Harrison Mala	Kossa	Malaita Kingz	6–2	15 December 2019
(Solomon Islands) Alfred Sade	Malaita Kingz	Marist	6–0	21 December 2019
(Solomon Islands) Raphael Lea'i^{11}	Henderson Eels	Real Kakamora	0–19	25 January 2020
