= 2013–14 Solomon Islands S-League =

2013–14 Telekom S-League
- Season: 2013–14
- Matches played: 64
- Goals scored: 253 (3.95 per match)
- Top goalscorer: (Solomon Islands) Dennis Ifunaoa (11 goals)
- Highest scoring: Hana 0–10 Solomon Warriors (10 goals)

The 2013–14 Telekom S-League was the 10th season of the Telekom S-League in the Solomon Islands. Solomon Warriors won the championship for the second time and also qualified as the Solomon Islands representative for the 2014–15 OFC Champions League. All matches were played at the hillside ground called Lawson Tama Stadium, with an approximate capacity of 20,000.

== Teams ==
- Hana (Honiara)
- Koloale FC (Honiara)
- Kossa FC (Honiara)
- Malaita Kingz FC (Malaita)
- Marist Fire (Honiara)
- Real Kakamora FC (Makira-Ulawa)
- Solomon Warriors (Honiara)
- Western United (Western)
- X-Beam (Honiara)

== Standings ==
Pos	Team	Pld	W	D	L	GF	GA	GD	Pts	Qualification
1	Solomon Warriors (C)	15	11	4	0	55	15	+40	37	Qualified for the 2013–14 OFC Champions League & 2014 Melanesian Super Cup
2	Kossa FC	15	8	2	5	39	26	+13	26	
3	Western United	15	7	3	5	30	28	+2	24	
4	X-Beam	15	7	4	4	43	27	+16	25	
5	Malaita Kingz	15	6	5	4	25	20	+5	23	
6	Koloale FC	15	5	5	5	25	26	−1	20	
7	Hana	15	5	1	9	24	45	−21	16	
8	Real Kakamora FC	15	2	2	11	12	42	−30	8	
9	Marist Fire* (D)	8	0	0	8	0	24	−24	0	

(C) Champions; (D) Disqualified

[ * ] All matches of the first eight rounds were awarded 3–0 against Marist Fire F.C. due to failure to pay registration fees, resulting in disqualification from the competition.

== Top scorers ==
Rank	Player	Club	Goals
1	(Solomon Islands) Dennis Ifunaoa	Solomon Warriors	11
2	(Solomon Islands) Kidston Billy	X-Beam	8
2	(Solomon Islands) Joe Luwi	Koloale FC Honiara	7
2	(Solomon Islands) Himson Teleda	Western United	7
2	(Solomon Islands) Moffat Kilifa	Solomon Warriors	7
2	(Solomon Islands) George Suri	Kossa	7
4	(Solomon Islands) Hudson Felani	Kossa	4
4	(Solomon Islands) John Anita	X-Beam	4
5	(Solomon Islands) Ian Paia	Koloale FC Honiara	3
5	(Solomon Islands) Jerry Donga	Solomon Warriors	3
5	(Solomon Islands) Judd Molea	Solomon Warriors	3
5	(Solomon Islands) Micah Lea'alafa	Solomon Warriors	3
