= 2014–15 Solomon Islands S-League =

2014–15 Telekom S-League
- Season: 2014–15
- Champions: (Solomon Islands) Western United
- Matches played: 72
- Goals scored: 257 (3.57 per match)

The 2014–15 Telekom S-League was the 11th season of the Telekom S-League in the Solomon Islands. Western United won the championship for the first time and also qualified as the Solomon Islands representative for the 2014–15 OFC Champions League. All matches were played at the hillside ground called Lawson Tama Stadium, with an approximate capacity of 20,000.

== Teams ==
- Hana (Honiara)
- Koloale FC (Honiara)
- Kossa FC (Honiara)
- Malaita Kingz FC (Malaita)
- Marist Fire (Honiara)
- Real Kakamora FC (Makira-Ulawa)
- Solomon Warriors (Honiara)
- Western United (Western)
- X-Beam (Honiara)

== Standings ==
| Pos | Team | Pld | W | D | L | GF | GA | GD | Pts | Qualification |
|---|---|---|---|---|---|---|---|---|---|---|
| 1 | Western United (C) | 16 | 13 | 1 | 2 | 51 | 13 | +38 | 40 | Qualified for the 2014–15 OFC Champions League & 2015 Melanesian Super Cup |
| 2 | Solomon Warriors | 16 | 12 | 3 | 1 | 47 | 14 | +33 | 39 | Qualified for the 2015 Melanesian Super Cup |
| 3 | Hana | 16 | 9 | 3 | 4 | 20 | 18 | +2 | 30 | |
| 4 | Real Kakamora FC | 16 | 7 | 4 | 5 | 24 | 24 | 0 | 25 | |
| 5 | Kossa FC | 16 | 6 | 5 | 5 | 29 | 22 | +7 | 23 | |
| 6 | Malaita Kingz | 16 | 4 | 6 | 6 | 28 | 32 | −4 | 18 | |
| 7 | Koloale FC | 16 | 3 | 3 | 10 | 22 | 39 | −17 | 12 | |
| 8 | Marist Fire | 16 | 2 | 4 | 10 | 20 | 34 | −14 | 10 | |
| 9 | X-Beam (R) | 16 | 0 | 3 | 13 | 14 | 59 | −45 | 3 | Relegated to the 2014–15 Solomon Islands Second Division |

(C) Champions; (R) Relegated
