= Paul Francis (footballer) =

Solomon Islands footballer (born 2005)

Personal information
- Full name: Paul Francis
- Date of birth: 5 December 2005 (age 20)
- Place of birth: Solomon Islands
- Position: Left winger

Team information
- Current team: Nasinu

Youth career
- East Guadalcanal

Senior career*
Years	Team	Apps	(Gls)
2020	East Guadalcanal	4	(1)
2021	Henderson Eels	14	(6)
2022–2023	Waneagu United	17	(19)
2023	→ Henderson Eels (loan)	2	(2)
2024–2025	Real Kakamora	20	(17)
2025–	Nasinu	13	(12)
2026–	→ East Guadalcanal (loan)	0	(0)

International career^{‡}
2020	Guadalcanal		(2)
2022–2024	Solomon Islands U20	7	(7)
2022	Solomon Islands U23	1	(0)
2024	Solomon Islands "B"	4	(1)
2024–	Solomon Islands	1	(0)
- * Club domestic league appearances and goals ‡ National team caps and goals as of 22:18, 28 May 2025 (UTC)

Paul Francis (born 5 December 2005) is a Solomon Islands professional footballer who plays as a left winger for East Guadalcanal, on loan from Fiji Premier League club Nasinu. Since 2024, he has represented the Solomon Islands national team. Known for his pace, dribbling skill, and goal-scoring ability, he is regarded as one of the best young players in Oceania.

== Club career ==
Born in Guadalcanal Province, Francis began his career at local side East Guadalcanal Frigates and represented the team at the 2020 Guadalcanal Cup. As a 14-year-old, he was named to the Guadalcanal provincial football team for the 2020 Solomon Cup, where he scored two goals. Francis's ability was noticed by Guadalcanal coach Eddie Marahare, who also served as the head coach for 2020–21 league champions Henderson Eels.

Aged 15, Francis made his senior debut for Eels in the 2021 season during the match against Southern United on 12 June 2021 and his first goals came during the 4–1 win against Marist on July 11, in which he scored a brace. After the end of the season, Francis was then signed by Waneagu United. In his first full season, Francis scored 11 goals in all competitions with Waneagu as the team's top scorer. Francis temporarily returned to Eels to begin the 2023 season on loan, before being re-called by Waneagu at mid-season. He then joined Real Kakamora in 2024.

Francis rose to international prominence in 2024, in which his goal-scoring exploits for S-League club Real Kakamora (which had famously lost all 22 of their matches the previous season) helped lead the team to a third-placed finish, their best in club history. Almost immediately, Francis became a beloved cult hero among the club's supporters, and finished 3rd in the league's golden boot race that season, scoring 17 goals for Kakamora in 20 matches played. However, Kakamora's league license was controversially not renewed by the S-League the following year, preventing them from competing in the competition. Despite drawing interest from multiple prominent clubs in the region, Francis signed with Fiji Premier League club Nasinu on a one-year contract instead, who were coming off a campaign in which they narrowly avoided relegation. Despite missing significant time due to injuries and an illness suffered by his daughter, Francis managed to score 10 goals in 10 matches with the club in the 2025 season, which included a hat trick against Nadi in March. Although he was absent for almost half the club's matches, Francis still finished with the third-most goals out of any Fiji Premier League player that season. Despite initially finalizing an agreement to return to Nasinu in 2026 with Kakamora still unable to compete, he began to attract interest from clubs in Australia's NPL Victoria.

After missing the first half of the season, Francis rejoined Nasinu and finished the year with two goals in three matches played. At the 2026 Battle of the Giants, Francis helped lead Nasinu to a shock semi-final appearance, scoring twice in the group stage in victories over Labasa and Suva before striking again in the semi-final against Rewa. It was Nasinu's first semi-final appearance in a major tournament since 2019. Ahead of the Inter-District Championship, Francis was allowed to temporarily return to East Guadalcanal to captain the side at the 2026 Guadalcanal Cup.

== International career ==
Francis has represented the Solomon Islands U20 and U23 teams since 2022 during the OFC U-19 Championship and the 2023 OFC Men's Olympic Qualifying Tournament. He also represented the Solomon Islands "B" national team during the 2024 MSG Prime Minister's Cup, scoring the team's only goal at the tournament during a 3–1 loss against Vanuatu.

He was first called up to the Solomon Islands senior team for the 2023 Tri-Nations Series and was included on the bench during a 2–0 victory against Fiji on 20 March 2023. As a second-half substitute on 14 November 2024, Francis made his debut for Solomon Islands during a 3–2 loss against New Caledonia during 2026 FIFA World Cup qualification. Francis's exclusion from the team's other two matches, including a 1–0 loss to 10-man Fiji, drew significant controversy from fans of Solomon football and led to calls for the sacking of national team head coach Josh Smith. Smith was sacked in early 2026 after winning only three matches in his tenure, with the incident being cited as one of the causes which led to his ousting.

== Career statistics ==
=== Club ===
Only league statistics are known.

Appearances and goals by club, season and competition
Club	Season	League		
Club	Season	Division	Apps	Goals
East Guadalcanal Frigates	2020	Guadalcanal Cup	4	1
Henderson Eels	2021	S-League	14	6
Waneagu United	2022–23	S-League	11	11
Waneagu United	2023	S-League	6	8
Henderson Eels (loan)	2023	S-League	2	2
Real Kakamora	2024	S-League	20	17
Nasinu	2025	Fiji Premier League	10	10
Nasinu	2026	Fiji Premier League	3	2
Career total			67	45

=== International ===
As of match played 21 December 2024.

Appearances and goals by national team and year
National team	Year	Apps	Goals
Guadalcanal	2020	?	2
Total		?	2
Solomon Islands "B"	2024	4	1
Total		4	1
Solomon Islands	2024	1	0
Solomon Islands	2025	0	0
Total		1	0
Career total		5+	3

Scores and results list Solomon Islands' goal tally first, score column indicates score after each Francis goal.

List of international goals scored by Paul Francis
No.	Team	Date	Venue	Opponent	Score	Result	Competition	Ref.
1.	Solomon Islands "B"	15 December 2024	Lawson Tama Stadium, Honiara, Solomon Islands	Vanuatu	1–1	1–3	2024 MSG Prime Minister's Cup	

== Honours ==
East Guadalcanal Frigates

- Guadalcanal Cup: 2020

Henderson Eels

- Solomon Islands S-League: 2020–21

Real Kakamora

- Solomon Islands S-League: third place 2024

Solomon Islands

- Tri-Nations Series: 2023
