= 2011–12 Solomon Islands S-League =

2011–12 Telekom S-League
- Season: 2011–12
- Champions: (Solomon Islands) Solomon Warriors F.C.
- Matches played: 56
- Goals scored: 236 (4.21 per match)

The 2011–12 Telekom S-League was the 9th season of the Telekom S-League in the Solomon Islands. Solomon Warriors won the championship for the first time and also qualified as the Solomon Islands representative for the 2012–13 OFC Champions League. All matches were played at the hillside ground called Lawson Tama Stadium, with an approximate capacity of 20,000.

== Teams ==
- Hana (Honiara)
- Koloale (Honiara)
- KOSSA (Honiara)
- Malaita Kingz (Malaita)
- Marist Fire (Honiara)
- Real Kakamora (Makira-Ulawa)
- Solomon Warriors (Honiara)
- Western United (Western)

== Standings ==
Pos	Team	Pld	W	D	L	GF	GA	GD	Pts	Qualification
1	Solomon Warriors* (C)	14	11	1	2	41	11	+30	34	Qualified for the 2012–13 OFC Champions League
2	Western United	14	10	1	3	33	22	+11	31	
3	Koloale FC	14	8	3	3	54	20	+34	27	
4	Real Kakamora FC	14	7	0	7	22	29	−7	21	
5	Malaita Kingz	14	4	3	7	19	23	−4	15	
6	Kossa FC	14	4	2	8	29	41	−12	14	
7	Hana	14	3	2	9	22	44	−22	11	
8	Marist Fire	14	1	4	9	16	46	−30	7	

(C) Champions

[ * ] Solomon Warriors did not advance to the Solomon Islands playoff for the 2012–13 OFC Champions League because they also won the 2012 Knockout Championship.
