= 2010–11 Solomon Islands S-League =

2010-11 Telekom S-League
- Season: 2010-11
- Champions: (Solomon Islands) Koloale F.C.
- Matches played: 56
- Goals scored: 177 (3.16 per match)
- Top goalscorer: Benjamin Totori (23 goals)

The 2010–11 Telekom S-League was the 8th season of the Telekom S-League in the Solomon Islands. Koloale won the league for the fourth time and also qualified as the Solomon Islands representative for the 2011–12 OFC Champions League through the 2011 Solomon Islands Champions League Playoff against Solomon Warriors. All matches were played at the hillside ground called Lawson Tama Stadium, with an approximate capacity of 20,000.

== Teams ==
- Hana (Honiara)
- Koloale (Honiara)
- KOSSA (Honiara)
- Malaita Kingz (Malaita)
- Marist Fire (Honiara)
- Real Kakamora (Makira-Ulawa)
- Solomon Warriors (Honiara)
- Western United (Western)

== Standings ==
Pos	Team	Pld	W	D	L	GF	GA	GD	Pts	Qualification
1	Koloale FC (C)	14	11	2	1	46	12	+34	35	Qualified for the 2011 Solomon Islands Champions League Playoff
2	Solomon Warriors	14	9	4	1	31	13	+18	31	
3	Kossa FC	14	6	4	4	24	21	+3	22	
4	Western United	14	6	2	6	20	18	+2	20	
5	Malaita Kingz	14	4	4	6	10	22	−12	16	
6	Hana	14	4	3	7	24	24	0	15	
7	Marist Fire	14	3	5	6	15	25	−10	14	
8	Real Kakamora FC	14	0	2	12	7	42	−35	2	

(C) Champions
