= 2015–16 Solomon Islands S-League =

2015–16 Telekom S-League
- Season: 2015–16
- Champions: Solomon Warriors
- Matches played: 62
- Goals scored: 222 (3.58 per match)
- Highest scoring: Real Kakamora 0–8; Western United
- All statistics correct as of 24 October 2015.

The 2015–16 Telekom S-League was the 12th season of the Telekom S-League in the Solomon Islands. The winner will qualify for the 2015–16 OFC Champions League. All matches are to be played at the hillside ground, Lawson Tama Stadium, with an approximate capacity of 20,000.

== Teams ==
- FC Guadalcanal (Guadalcanal)
- Koloale (Honiara)
- KOSSA (Honiara)
- Malaita Kingz (Malaita)
- Marist Fire (Honiara)
- Real Kakamora (Makira-Ulawa)
- Solomon Warriors (Honiara)
- West Honiara (Honiara)
- Western United (Western)

== Standings ==
Pos	Team	Pld	W	D	L	GF	GA	GD	Pts	Qualification
1	Solomon Warriors (C)	16	13	3	0	58	7	+51	42	Qualified for the 2016 OFC Champions League
2	Western United	16	11	1	4	53	18	+35	34	
3	Marist Fire	16	10	2	4	27	31	−4	32	
4	Kossa FC	16	8	3	5	41	25	+16	27	
5	Malaita Kingz	16	8	1	7	30	22	+8	25	
6	Koloale FC	16	4	3	9	22	37	−15	15	
7	Real Kakamora FC	16	4	3	9	22	44	−22	15	
8	FC Guadalcanal	16	2	3	11	10	36	−26	9	
9	West Honiara	16	1	3	12	9	52	−43	6	
10	Hana (R)	0	0	0	0	0	0	0	0	Team withdrew pre season

Source: RSSSF
(C) Champions; (R) Relegated

== Regular season ==
=== Round 1 ===
22 August 2015

Guadalcanal	0–1	Solomon Warriors

Lawson Tama Stadium, Honiara
22 August 2015

West Honiara	0–0	Real Kakamora

Lawson Tama Stadium, Honiara
23 August 2015

KOSSA	1–2	Malaita Kingz

Lawson Tama Stadium, Honiara
23 August 2015

Western United	1–1	Koloale

Lawson Tama Stadium, Honiara

=== Round 2 ===
29 August 2015

Guadalcanal	1–2	Western United

Lawson Tama Stadium, Honiara
29 August 2015

KOSSA	5–1	West Honiara

Lawson Tama Stadium, Honiara
30 August 2015

Malaita Kingz	0–2	Solomon Warriors

Lawson Tama Stadium, Honiara
30 August 2015

Marist Fire	4–1	Real Kakamora

Lawson Tama Stadium, Honiara

=== Round 3 ===
5 September 2015

Real Kakamora	0–8	Western United

Lawson Tama Stadium, Honiara
5 September 2015

West Honiara	2–0	Guadalcanal

Lawson Tama Stadium, Honiara
6 September 2015

Koloale	0–1	Marist Fire

Lawson Tama Stadium, Honiara
6 September 2015

Solomon Warriors	3–3	KOSSA

Lawson Tama Stadium, Honiara

=== Round 4 ===
12 September 2015

Western United	0–2	KOSSA

Lawson Tama Stadium, Honiara
12 September 2015

Guadalcanal	1–2	Marist Fire

Lawson Tama Stadium, Honiara
13 September 2015

Real Kakamora	1–1	Koloale

Lawson Tama Stadium, Honiara
13 September 2015

Malaita Kingz	2–0	West Honiara

Lawson Tama Stadium, Honiara

=== Round 5 ===
19 September 2015

Marist Fire	0–0	KOSSA

Lawson Tama Stadium, Honiara
19 September 2015

Malaita Kingz	0–2	Western United

Lawson Tama Stadium, Honiara
20 September 2015

Koloale	0–1	Guadalcanal

Lawson Tama Stadium, Honiara
20 September 2015

Solomon Warriors	3–0	West Honiara

Lawson Tama Stadium, Honiara

=== Round 6 ===
26 September 2015

Marist Fire	0–4	Malaita Kingz

Lawson Tama Stadium, Honiara
26 September 2015

KOSSA	2–3	Koloale

Lawson Tama Stadium, Honiara
27 September 2015

Western United	0–2	Solomon Warriors

Lawson Tama Stadium, Honiara
27 September 2015

Guadalcanal	1–3	Real Kakamora

Lawson Tama Stadium, Honiara

=== Round 7 ===
3 October 2015

Koloale	0–2	Malaita Kingz

Lawson Tama Stadium, Honiara
4 October 2015

Real Kakamora	0–4	KOSSA

Lawson Tama Stadium, Honiara
4 October 2015

West Honiara	0–4	Western United

Lawson Tama Stadium, Honiara
28 October 2015

Solomon Warriors	8–0	Marist Fire

Lawson Tama Stadium, Honiara

=== Round 8 ===
10 October 2015

Real Kakamora	1–5	Malaita Kingz

Lawson Tama Stadium, Honiara
11 October 2015

West Honiara	1–1	Marist Fire

Lawson Tama Stadium, Honiara
11 October 2015

Guadalcanal	0–2	KOSSA

Lawson Tama Stadium, Honiara
21 October

Solomon Warriors	7–0	Koloale

Lawson Tama Stadium, Honiara

=== Round 9 ===
17 October 2015

Solomon Warriors	5–1	Real Kakamora

Lawson Tama Stadium, Honiara
17 October 2015

Koloale	2–0	West Honiara

Lawson Tama Stadium, Honiara
18 October 2015

Malaita Kingz	6–1	Guadalcanal

Lawson Tama Stadium, Honiara
18 October 2015

Marist Fire	3–2	Western United

Lawson Tama Stadium, Honiara

=== Round 10 ===
24 October 2015

Western United	6–0	Marist Fire

Lawson Tama Stadium, Honiara
24 October 2015

Guadalcanal	2–1	Malaita Kingz

Lawson Tama Stadium, Honiara
25 October 2015

Real Kakamora	1–4	Solomon Warriors

Lawson Tama Stadium, Honiara
25 October 2015

West Honiara	2–5 *	Koloale

Lawson Tama Stadium, Honiara

=== Round 11 ===
31 October 2015

KOSSA	4–0	Guadalcanal

Lawson Tama Stadium, Honiara
31 October 2015

Marist Fire	4–0 *	West Honiara

Lawson Tama Stadium, Honiara
1 November 2015

Malaita Kingz	1–2	Real Kakamora

Lawson Tama Stadium, Honiara
1 November 2015

Koloale	0–7	Solomon Warriors

Lawson Tama Stadium, Honiara

=== Round 12 ===
7 November 2015

Western United	6–0	West Honiara

Lawson Tama Stadium, Honiara
7 November 2015

KOSSA	2–1	Real Kakamora

Lawson Tama Stadium, Honiara
8 November 2015

Malaita Kingz	1–0	Koloale

Lawson Tama Stadium, Honiara
8 November 2015

Marist Fire	0–3	Solomon Warriors

Lawson Tama Stadium, Honiara

=== Round 13 ===
14 November 2015

Real Kakamora	1–1 *	Guadalcanal

Lawson Tama Stadium, Honiara
14 November 2015

Solomon Warriors	3–1	Western United

Lawson Tama Stadium, Honiara
15 November 2015

Malaita Kingz	0–2	Marist Fire

Lawson Tama Stadium, Honiara
15 November 2015

Koloale	2–2	KOSSA

Lawson Tama Stadium, Honiara

=== Round 14 ===
21 November 2015

West Honiara	0–5	Solomon Warriors

Lawson Tama Stadium, Honiara
21 November 2015

Guadalcanal	0–3	Koloale

Lawson Tama Stadium, Honiara
22 November 2015

Western United	5–1	Malaita Kingz

Lawson Tama Stadium, Honiara
22 November 2015

KOSSA	0–1	Marist Fire

Lawson Tama Stadium, Honiara

=== Round 15 ===
28 November 2015

Koloale	1–3	Real Kakamora

Lawson Tama Stadium, Honiara
28 November 2015

West Honiara	0–3	Malaita Kingz

Lawson Tama Stadium, Honiara
29 November 2015

Marist Fire	2–1	Guadalcanal

Lawson Tama Stadium, Honiara
29 November 2015

KOSSA	2–3	Western United

Lawson Tama Stadium, Honiara

=== Round 16 ===
5 December 2015

Real Kakamora	1–3	Marist Fire

Lawson Tama Stadium, Honiara
5 December 2015

Malaita Kingz	0–0	Solomon Warriors

Lawson Tama Stadium, Honiara
12 December 2015

Guadalcanal	1–1	West Honiara

Lawson Tama Stadium, Honiara
12 December 2015

Western United	4–2	Real Kakamora

Lawson Tama Stadium, Honiara

=== Round 17 ===
19 December 2015

KOSSA	4–2	Malaita Kingz

Lawson Tama Stadium, Honiara
19 December 2015

Western United	3–1	Koloale

Lawson Tama Stadium, Honiara
20 December 2015

Guadalcanal	0–0	Solomon Warriors

Lawson Tama Stadium, Honiara
20 December 2015

West Honiara	0–4	Real Kakamora

Lawson Tama Stadium, Honiara
