= 2020–21 Solomon Islands S-League =

Telekom S-League
- Season: 2020–21
- Champions: Henderson Eels
- Matches: 110
- Goals: 476 (4.33 per match)
- Top goalscorer: (Solomon Islands) Joses Nawo (35 goals)

The 2020–21 Telekom S-League was the 17th season of the Telekom S-League, the top football league in the Solomon Islands.

The league started on 8 August 2020.

== Teams ==
Eleven teams play the 2020 season, an increase from nine in the 2019–2020 season. FC Guadalcanal from the previous season did not enter, and were replaced by Central Coast, Honiara City and Southern United.

- Central Coast (Honiara)
- Henderson Eels (Honiara)
- Honiara City (Honiara)
- Isabel United (Isabel Province)
- Kossa (Honiara)
- Laugu United (Honiara)
- Malaita Kingz (Malaita)
- Marist (Honiara)
- Real Kakamora (Makira-Ulawa)
- Solomon Warriors (Honiara)
- Southern United (Honiara)

== League table ==
Pos	Team	Pld	W	D	L	GF	GA	GD	Pts	Qualification or relegation
1	Henderson Eels	20	16	2	2	97	15	+82	50	Qualification to OFC Champions League group stage
2	Solomon Warriors	20	16	1	3	71	21	+50	49	Qualification to OFC Champions League group stage
3	Central Coast	20	11	5	4	35	15	+20	38	
4	Isabel United	20	9	5	6	54	37	+17	32	
5	Honiara City	20	7	8	5	33	31	+2	29	
6	Laugu United	20	8	5	7	32	39	−7	29	
7	Marist	20	7	4	9	35	37	−2	25	
8	Real Kakamora	20	7	2	11	34	51	−17	23	
9	Southern United	20	6	0	14	32	62	−30	18	
10	Kossa	20	4	5	11	33	59	−26	17	
11	Malaita Kingz	20	0	1	19	20	109	−89	1	

Source: SIFF, Soccerway

== Top scorers ==
Rank	Player	Team	Goals
1	(Solomon Islands) Joses Nawo	Henderson Eels	35
2	(Solomon Islands) Raphael Lea'i	Henderson Eels	33
3	(Solomon Islands) Gagame Feni	Solomon Warriors	19
4	(Solomon Islands) Bobby Leslie	Marist	15
5	(Solomon Islands) Bently Kelobi	Isabel United	11
5	(Solomon Islands) Adrian Mara	Real Kakamora	11
5	(Solomon Islands) Alvin Ray	Isabel United	11
8	(Solomon Islands) Dennis Ifunaoa	Solomon Warriors	9
9	(Solomon Islands) Molea Tigi	Solomon Warriors	8

== Hat-tricks ==
Player	For	Against	Score	Date
(Solomon Islands) Joses Nawo^{4}	Henderson Eels	Laugu United	0–7	15 August 2020
(Solomon Islands) Adrian Mara	Real Kakamora	Southern United	4–2	28 August 2020
(Solomon Islands) Joses Nawo^{4}	Henderson Eels	Southern United	0–10	29 August 2020
(Solomon Islands) Lore Fonaota^{4}	Kossa	Malaita Kingz	6–2	16 September 2020
(Solomon Islands) Raphael Lea'i^{7}	Henderson Eels	Malaita Kingz	15–0	3 October 2020
(Solomon Islands) Joses Nawo^{6}	Henderson Eels	Malaita Kingz	15–0	3 October 2020
(Solomon Islands) Gagame Feni	Solomon Warriors	Marist	3–5	18 November 2020
(Solomon Islands) Molea Tigi	Solomon Warriors	Kossa	7–0	21 November 2020
(Solomon Islands) Harrison Mala	Kossa	Malaita Kingz	1–7	10 February 2021
(Solomon Islands) Raphael Lea'i	Henderson Eels	Kossa	6–1	20 February 2021
(Solomon Islands) Bartholomew Talakoro	Real Kakamora	Malaita Kingz	6–2	24 February 2021
(Solomon Islands) Raphael Lea'i^{4}	Henderson Eels	Malaita Kingz	0–15	27 February 2021
(Solomon Islands) Joses Nawo^{7}	Henderson Eels	Malaita Kingz	0–15	27 February 2021
(Solomon Islands) Alvin Ray^{4}	Isabel United	Kossa	0–9	27 February 2021
(Solomon Islands) Bobby Leslie	Marist	Laugu United	5–1	28 February 2021
(Solomon Islands) Edward Huniuehu	Isabel United	Malaita Kingz	7–2	7 March 2021
(Solomon Islands) Gagame Feni^{7}	Solomon Warriors	Malaita Kingz	1–11	10 March 2021
(Solomon Islands) Joses Nawo	Henderson Eels	Real Kakamora	6–1	10 March 2021
(Solomon Islands) Raphael Lea'i	Henderson Eels	Southern United	6–0	17 March 2021
(Solomon Islands) Joses Nawo	Henderson Eels	Southern United	6–0	17 March 2021
