= 2016 Solomon Islands S-League =

2016 Telekom S-League
- Season: 2016
- Champions: Marist Fire
- Matches played: 72
- Goals scored: 325 (4.51 per match)
- Top goalscorer: (Solomon Islands) James Naka (27 goals)

The 2016 Telekom S-League is the 13th season of the Telekom S-League in the Solomon Islands. All matches are played at the hillside ground called Lawson Tama Stadium, with an approximate capacity of 20,000.

== Standings ==
| Pos | Team | Pld | W | D | L | GF | GA | GD | Pts | Qualification |
|---|---|---|---|---|---|---|---|---|---|---|
| 1 | Marist Fire (C) | 16 | 13 | 1 | 2 | 54 | 18 | +36 | 40 | Qualification for the 2017 OFC Champions League |
| 2 | Western United | 16 | 10 | 5 | 1 | 72 | 20 | +52 | 35 | Qualification for the 2017 OFC Champions League |
| 3 | Solomon Warriors | 16 | 10 | 2 | 4 | 60 | 20 | +40 | 32 | |
| 4 | Malaita Kingz | 16 | 9 | 3 | 4 | 32 | 18 | +14 | 30 | |
| 5 | Kossa | 16 | 8 | 2 | 6 | 42 | 25 | +17 | 26 | |
| 6 | Koloale FC | 16 | 6 | 1 | 9 | 20 | 42 | −22 | 19 | |
| 7 | Real Kakamora | 16 | 5 | 2 | 9 | 36 | 46 | −10 | 17 | |
| 8 | FC Guadalcanal | 16 | 2 | 1 | 13 | 11 | 66 | −55 | 7 | |
| 9 | West Honiara | 16 | 0 | 1 | 15 | 18 | 90 | −72 | 1 | |

Updated to match(es) played on 17 December 2016. Source: rsssf.com
(C) Champions
