= Honiara FA League =

The Honiara FA Leagues are a group of association football competitions based in Honiara, Solomon Islands. Composed of the Honiara Super League, HFA Division One, and HFA Division Two, the leagues make up the second through fourth tiers of football in the Solomon Islands. They are operated by the Honiara Football Association.

== Teams ==
List of all teams that participated.

- Hana FC
- HPF FC
- Junior Flamingo FC
- K1 United FC
- Laugu United FC
- Koloale FC
- Kossa FC
- Makuru FC
- Marist FC
- Naha F.C.
- Rangers FC
- Solomon Warriors FC
- Sunbeam FC
- Zome Mars FC

== Winners (Super League) ==
Club	Total Titles Won	Years
Real Kakamora	9	1969, 1971, 1972, 1973, 1974, 1975, 1976, 1978, 1979
Rangers FC	8	1985, 1988, 1991, 1995, 1996, 1997, 1998, 1999
Koloale FC	3	2001, 2003, 2007–08
Sunbeam FC	3	1984, 1989, 1990
Makuru FC	2	2004, 2006–07
HPF FC	1	1994
Laugu United FC	1	2000
