= Jeffery Bule =

Association football and futsal player from the Solomon Islands

Personal information
- Full name: Jeffery Bule
- Date of birth: 15 November 1991 (age 34)
- Place of birth: Solomon Islands
- Position: Midfielder

Team information
- Current team: Real Kakamora
- Number: 8

Senior career*
Years	Team	Apps	(Gls)
2008–2011	Koloale FC Honiara		
2012	Solomon Warriors		
2013–2014	Amicale		
2014–2016	Western United		
2016–2018	Marist		
2018	Suva		
2020-2021	Laugu United		
2022-2023	Central Coast		
2024	Real Kakamora	21	

International career^{‡}
2012	Solomon Islands U-23	3	(0)
2011–	Solomon Islands	18	(2)
2009	Solomon Islands Futsal		
Medal record
Men's football
Representing Solomon Islands
Pacific Games
Silver medal – second place	2011 New Caledonia
Pacific Mini Games
Bronze medal – third place	2017 Vanuatu
- * Club domestic league appearances and goals as of 23 August 2018 ‡ National team caps and goals as of 15 December 2017

Jeffery Bule (born 15 November 1991) is an association football and futsal player from the Solomon Islands. He plays as a midfielder and serves as the team captain for Real Kakamora in the Telekom S-League, as well as the Solomon Islands 11-a-side and futsal teams.

== Club career ==
Bule played for Koloale in both legs of the 2009 OFC Champions League Final against Auckland City FC on 25 April 2009 and 3 May 2009. Koloale lost 9–4 on aggregate.

Bule played six times for Koloale in the 2010–11 season, making his first appearance in the 2–1 loss to Lautoka F.C. on 23 October 2010. On 5 February 2011, he scored his first goal in the season.

After a two-year stint at Central Coast which saw Bule score a goal in the 2022 OFC Champions League in a group stage match against ABM Galaxy, Bule was signed by Real Kakamora in 2024, and was quickly appointed team captain for his leadership and experience on a team mostly composed of young players. That season, Kakamora, who were unable to obtain a single point in the prior season, rose to worldwide prominence through the success of their unique Instagram account, putting Bule in the spotlight as he helped lead the side to an unprecedented third-place finish, the best in club history.

== International career ==
Bule made his debut for the Solomon Islands on 27 July 2011 in a 0–0 draw with Vanuatu. He was also called up to the Solomon Islands' 2011 Pacific Games squad in New Caledonia. Bule played in the 7–0 win against Guam on 27 August 2011. He went on to earn his third cap in the 4–0 win over American Samoa on 30 August 2011, scoring his team's second goal in the fourteenth minute.

=== International goals ===
Scores and results list the Solomon Islands' goal tally first.

No	Date	Venue	Opponent	Score	Result	Competition
1.	30 August 2011	Stade Boewa, Boulari Bay, New Caledonia	American Samoa	2–0	4–0	2011 Pacific Games
2.	9 December 2017	Port Vila Municipal Stadium, Port Vila, Vanuatu	Tuvalu	3–0	6–0	2017 Pacific Mini Games

== Honours ==
Solomon Islands

- Pacific Games: Silver Medalist, 2011
- Pacific Mini Games: Bronze Medalist, 2017
