= 2024 Solomon Islands S-League =

Solomon Islands S-League
- Season: 2024
- Dates: 27 April – 4 October
- Champions: Central Coast (2nd title)
- Champions League: Central Coast; Solomon Warriors
- Matches: 132
- Goals: 503 (3.81 per match)
- Top goalscorer: Dennis Ifunaoa (27 goals)
- Best goalkeeper: Philip Mango
- Highest scoring: Solomon Warriors 9–1 Juniper Tree (1 June); Honiara City 4–6 Henderson Eels (21 September)
- Longest winning run: 9 matches Solomon Warriors (21 August – 1 October)
- Longest unbeaten run: 16 matches Central Coast (27 April – 11 September)
- Longest winless run: 12 matches Juniper Tree (27 April – 3 August); Southern United (4 May – 17 August)
- Longest losing run: 7 matches Juniper Tree (26 May – 3 August)
- All statistics correct as of 4 October 2024.

The 2024 S-League, known as the 2024 Telekom S-League for sponsorship reasons, was the 24th season of the Solomon Islands S-League, the highest level of the Solomon Islands football league system. The season began on 27 April and concluded on 4 October. Central Coast FC won the league.

Real Kakamora F.C., who had only won three games in the league's past three seasons, notably made a massive improvement, with the club breaking its 33-match losing streak on 1 May 2024. Having finished last the previous season, Real Kakamora spent much of the early season leading the championship, and ended in third place.

== Teams ==
The league consists of 12 teams.

- Central Coast
- Henderson Eels
- Honiara City
- Juniper Tree
- KOSSA
- Laugu United
- Marist
- Real Kakamora
- Solomon Warriors
- SOSA
- Southern United
- Waneagu United

== League table ==
Pos	Team	Pld	W	D	L	GF	GA	GD	Pts	Qualification or relegation
1	Central Coast (C)	22	16	5	1	70	18	+52	53	Qualification to Champions League group stage
2	Solomon Warriors	22	16	4	2	76	21	+55	52	
3	Real Kakamora	22	14	3	5	58	23	+35	45	
4	Laugu United	22	12	7	3	43	21	+22	43	
5	Henderson Eels	22	10	6	6	45	35	+10	36	
6	Marist	22	10	4	8	36	39	−3	34	
7	Waneagu United	22	9	6	7	35	33	+2	33	
8	Honiara City	22	4	5	13	42	63	−21	17	
9	SOSA	22	4	5	13	25	56	−31	17	
10	KOSSA	22	4	5	13	31	65	−34	17	
11	Southern United	22	3	5	14	19	51	−32	14	
12	Juniper Tree	22	1	3	18	23	78	−55	6	

Source: Sofascore RSSSF
Rules for classification: 1) Points; 2) Goal difference; 3) Goals scored
(C) Champions

== Results ==
Each team plays each other twice (22 matches each).

Home \ Away	CCO	HEN	HCI	JUN	KOS	LAU	MAR	RKA	SWA	SOS	SOU	WAN
Central Coast	—	4–3	6–1	5–0	4–0	0–0	4–1	4–1	0–0	3–0	7–0	3–1
Henderson Eels	2–1	—	3–2	2–1	4–2	1–2	0–0	1–0	1–3	0–1	5–0	3–0
Honiara City	3–5	4–6	—	1–5	1–1	1–3	0–1	1–5	3–4	2–0	2–2	1–1
Juniper Tree	1–3	0–3	1–5	—	3–3	0–5	1–3	1–4	1–7	1–1	1–2	0–2
KOSSA	0–2	0–3	1–2	5–3	—	3–3	2–4	0–2	0–5	4–3	0–5	1–2
Laugu United	0–0	3–3	1–1	2–0	2–3	—	1–0	0–1	3–0	0–0	2–0	1–0
Marist	1–1	3–2	2–2	5–1	5–1	0–2	—	0–4	0–5	1–1	1–0	0–1
Real Kakamora	1–5	6–0	4–3	4–0	2–0	1–1	4–0	—	0–0	0–2	2–0	3–2
Solomon Warriors	0–2	1–1	4–1	9–1	6–0	4–1	7–1	3–2	—	8–0	1–0	2–1
SOSA	1–6	0–0	0–2	5–1	1–2	1–4	0–5	0–7	1–3	—	3–0	2–3
Southern United	0–3	1–1	3–2	1–1	2–2	1–2	0–2	0–5	0–2	1–1	—	1–2
Waneagu United	2–2	1–1	5–2	1–0	1–1	1–5	0–1	0–0	2–2	3–2	4–0	—

Source: RSSSF
Legend: Blue = home team win; Yellow = draw; Red = away team win.

=== Results by round ===
Team ╲ Round	1	2	3	4	5	6	7	8	9	10	11	12	13	14	15	16	17	18	19	20	21	22
Central Coast	W	W	D	D	W	W	W	W	W	W	D	W	W	D	W	W	L	D	W	W	W	W
Henderson Eels	D	L	L	W	L	W	L	W	W	W	D	D	W	W	W	D	D	L	W	W	D	L
Honiara City	L	W	W	D	L	W	L	L	L	D	L	W	L	L	L	L	D	D	L	L	L	D
Juniper Tree	L	L	L	L	D	L	L	L	L	L	L	L	W	D	L	L	L	L	L	D	L	L
KOSSA	L	L	L	L	D	L	L	W	W	L	L	L	D	L	L	W	D	W	D	D	L	L
Laugu United	W	W	L	W	D	L	W	W	W	W	D	W	W	W	D	L	D	D	W	W	D	D
Marist	W	L	W	L	D	W	D	W	L	W	W	L	W	D	L	L	D	W	W	W	L	L
Real Kakamora	L	W	W	W	W	W	L	W	L	D	D	W	W	W	W	L	D	W	W	W	L	W
Solomon Warriors	W	W	W	W	W	D	W	D	W	D	D	L	L	W	W	W	W	W	W	W	W	W
SOSA	L	L	D	W	L	L	D	L	W	L	L	D	L	W	D	L	L	L	L	L	D	W
Southern United	W	W	D	L	D	L	L	L	L	D	D	L	L	L	W	D	L	L	L	L	L	L
Waneagu United	D	L	D	D	W	W	W	D	W	D	L	L	L	L	W	W	W	W	L	L	D	W

Source: RSSSF
W = Win; D = Draw; L = Loss

=== Positions by round ===
To preserve chronological evolvements, any postponed matches are not included to the round at which they were originally scheduled, but added to the full round they were played immediately afterwards. For example, if a match is scheduled for round 7, but then played between rounds 8 and 9, it will be added to the standings for round 8.
Round 10 and 11 matches were postponed to different dates.

Team ╲ Round	1	2	3	4	5	6	7	8	9	10	11	12	13	14	15	16	17	18	19	20	21	22
Central Coast	1	1	2	4	4	3	3	4	5	5	5	4	1	1	1	1	1	1	2	3	3	1
Solomon Warriors	4	4	1	2	3	2	1	2	2	2	2	1	2	4	4	4	4	2	1	1	1	2
Real Kakamora	9	5	5	1	1	1	2	1	1	1	1	2	4	2	2	3	3	4	4	4	4	3
Laugu United	2	3	6	3	2	4	4	3	3	3	3	3	3	3	3	2	2	3	3	2	2	4
Henderson Eels	6	9	9	8	10	9	9	9	8	8	8	7	7	6	6	5	5	5	5	5	5	5
Marist	3	7	7	7	7	5	6	5	6	6	6	5	5	5	5	6	6	7	7	6	6	6
Waneagu United	7	8	8	10	8	6	5	6	4	4	4	6	6	7	7	7	7	6	6	7	7	7
Honiara City	8	6	4	5	6	8	7	7	7	7	7	8	8	8	8	8	8	8	8	8	9	8
SOSA	11	10	10	9	9	10	10	10	10	10	10	10	10	10	10	10	10	10	10	11	11	9
KOSSA	10	11	11	11	11	11	11	11	11	11	11	11	11	11	11	11	11	11	11	9	8	10
Southern United	5	2	3	6	5	7	8	8	9	9	9	9	9	9	9	9	9	9	9	10	10	11
Juniper Tree	12	12	12	12	12	12	12	12	12	12	12	12	12	12	12	12	12	12	12	12	12	12

Qualification for the OFC Champions League group stage

Source: RSSSF

== Season statistics ==
=== Top goalscorers ===
Rank	Player	Club	Goals
1	(Solomon Islands) Dennis Ifunaoa	Solomon Warriors	27
2	(Solomon Islands) Bobby Leslie	Central Coast	25
3	(Solomon Islands) Spencer Veao	Honiara City	21
4	(Solomon Islands) Paul Francis	Real Kakamora	17
5	(Solomon Islands) Jack J Ani	Henderson Eels	13
6	(Solomon Islands) Dickson Magi	Laugu United	11
7	(Solomon Islands) Junior Ere	Kossa	10
7	(Solomon Islands) Hadyn Irodao	Central Coast	10
9	(Solomon Islands) Adrian Abae	Waneagu United	9
9	(Solomon Islands) Ben Fox	Laugu United	9
9	(Solomon Islands) Norman Ngafu	Marist	9

==== Own goals ====
Rank	Player	Club	Own goals
1	Loea Mani	Solomon Warriors	1

=== Multiple hat-tricks ===
Player	For	Against	Result	Date
(Solomon Islands) John Orobulu	Southern United	Kossa	0-5	1 May 2024
(Solomon Islands) Stanley Sope	Honiara City	Juniper Tree	5–1	4 May 2024
(Solomon Islands) Paul Francis	Real Kakamora	Honiara City	5–1	10 June 2024
(Solomon Islands) Dennis Ifunaoa^{4}	Solomon Warriors	Kossa	5-1	31 July 2024
(Solomon Islands) Dickson Magi	Laugu United	Henderson Eels	3-3	7 September 2024
(Solomon Islands) Dennis Ifunaoa	Solomon Warriors	Juniper Tree	1-7	8 September 2024
(Solomon Islands) Junior Ere	Kossa	Sosa	4-3	14 September 2024
(Solomon Islands) Paul Francis	Real Kakamora	Honiara City	4-3	15 September 2024
(Solomon Islands) Spencer Veao	Honiara City	Henderson Eels	4-6	21 September 2024
(Solomon Islands) Bobby Leslie^{5}	Central Coast	Southern United	7-0	25 September 2024
(Solomon Islands) Dennis Ifunaoa^{4}	Solomon Warriors	Marist	7-1	1 October 2024

Note

(H) – Home; (A) – Away

=== Clean sheets ===
As of 4 October 2024

Rank	Player	Club	Clean sheets
1		Real Kakamora	12
2		Laugu United	10
2		Central Coast	10
4		Solomon Warriors	8
5		Henderson Eels	7
6		Marist	6
7		Waneagu United	5
7		SOSA	5
9		Honiara City	2
10		Southern United	1

== Attendances ==
#	Football club	Average attendance
1	Solomon Warriors	1,435
2	Central Coast	1,080
3	Real Kakamora	642
4	Laugu United	586
5	Henderson Eels	531
6	Marist	493
7	Waneagu United	474
8	KOSSA	368
9	Honiara City	276
10	SOSA	241
11	Southern United	198
12	Juniper Tree	179
