= Richard Hiromana =

Solomon Islands footballer

Personal information
- Date of birth: 9 November 1996 (age 29) / 30 November 1996 (age 29)
- Place of birth: Munda, Solomon Islands
- Position: Defender

Team information
- Current team: Real Kakamora

Senior career*
Years	Team	Apps	(Gls)
–2017	Real Kakamora		
2017–2018	Marist		
2018–	Real Kakamora		

International career^{‡}
2017–	Solomon Islands	11	(0)
Medal record
Men's football
Representing Solomon Islands
Pacific Mini Games
Bronze medal – third place	2017 Vanuatu
- * Club domestic league appearances and goals as of 23 August 2018 ‡ National team caps and goals as of 18 July 2019

Richard Hiromana, sometimes spelled Richard Hirimana (born 9 November 1996 or 30 November 1996) is a Solomon Islands footballer who plays as a defender for Real Kakamora. He made his debut for the national team on 25 May 2017, in a 1–1 draw against Fiji.

== Club career ==
Hiromana started his career with Real Kakamora. After Marist had played in the 2017 OFC Champions League he joined the team. In 2018 Hiromana returned home to Real Kakamora.

== International ==
Hiromana was named in the Solomon Islands national squad for the first time for two friendly's against Fiji. He made his debut in the first match on May 25, 2017, coming in as a substitute for Robert Laua in a 1–1 draw.

== Honours ==
Solomon Islands

- Pacific Mini Games: Bronze Medalist, 2017
