= Gagame Feni =

Solomon Islands footballer

Personal information
- Full name: Gagame Feni
- Date of birth: 21 August 1992 (age 34)
- Place of birth: Solomon Islands
- Height: 1.63 m (5 ft 4 in)
- Position: Striker

Team information
- Current team: Solomon Kings

Senior career*
Years	Team	Apps	(Gls)
2010–2011	Canterbury United	14	(2)
2011–2012	Waitakere United	9	(1)
2012–2014	Solomon Warriors		
2014–2017	Western United		
2017–2019	Solomon Warriors		
2019	Suva	10	(2)
2019	ABM Galaxy		
2020–2021	Solomon Warriors		(26)
2021–2023	Kossa		(57)
2024–2026	Solomon Warriors		(6)
2026	Solomon Kings	2	(0)
2026–	Suva	0	(0)

International career^{‡}
2012–	Solomon Islands	33	(19)
Medal record
Representing Solomon Islands
Pacific Games
Silver medal – second place	2023 Solomon Islands
Pacific Mini Games
Bronze medal – third place	2017 Vanuatu
MSG Prime Minister's Cup
Winner	2023 New Caledonia
- * Club domestic league appearances and goals as of 30 June 2024 ‡ National team caps and goals as of 18 June 2024

Gagame Feni (born 21 August 1992) is a Solomon Islands professional footballer who plays as a striker for Solomon Kings.

Feni began his senior career with Canterbury United in 2010, making 14 appearances and scoring 2 goals before moving to Waitakere United for the 2011–2012 season. He later played for several clubs in the Solomon Islands and the region, including Solomon Warriors, Western United, Suva, and ABM Galaxy, before returning to Solomon Warriors on multiple occasions. In 2026, he joined Solomon Kings.

At international level, Feni has represented the Solomon Islands national team since 2012, earning 33 caps and scoring 19 goals. He has competed in regional tournaments and was part of the squad that finished runner-up at the 2023 Pacific Games and won the 2023 MSG Prime Minister’s Cup with Solomon Islands.

== Club ==
As of 30 January 2025.

Cup: Fiji Football Association Cup Tournament, Inter-District Championship, Battle of the Giants and Champion versus Champion

Club	Season	League			Cup		Continental		Other		Total	
Club	Season	Division	Apps	Goals	Apps	Goals	Apps	Goals	Apps	Goals	Apps	Goals
Suva	2019	Premier League	10	2	15	10	0	0	0	0	25	12
Suva	2024	Premier League	5	3							5	3
Solomon Warriors	2024	S-League	8	6			2	2			10	8
Total career			23	11	15	10	2	2	0	0	40	23

== Career statistics ==
=== International ===
As of match played 18 June 2024

Appearances and goals by national team and year
National team	Year	Apps	Goals
Solomon Islands	2012	1	0
Solomon Islands	2016	6	0
Solomon Islands	2017	10	3
Solomon Islands	2019	8	10
Solomon Islands	2022	2	0
Solomon Islands	2023	5	6
Solomon Islands	2024	3	0
Total		35	19

Scores and results list Solomon Islands' goal tally first, score column indicates score after each Feni goal.

List of international goals scored by Gagame Feni
No.	Date	Venue	Opponent	Score	Result	Competition	Ref.
1	2 December 2017	Port Vila Municipal Stadium, Port Vila, Vanuatu	Tonga	5–0	8–0	2017 Pacific Mini Games	
2	2 December 2017	Port Vila Municipal Stadium, Port Vila, Vanuatu	Tonga	7–0	8–0	2017 Pacific Mini Games	
3	9 December 2017	Port Vila Municipal Stadium, Port Vila, Vanuatu	Tuvalu	4–0	6–0	2017 Pacific Mini Games	
4	8 June 2018	National Stadium, Kallang, Singapore	Singapore	1–1	3–4	Friendly	
5	8 July 2019	National Soccer Stadium, Apia, Samoa	Tuvalu	1–0	13–0	2019 Pacific Games	
6	8 July 2019	National Soccer Stadium, Apia, Samoa	Tuvalu	2–0	13–0	2019 Pacific Games	
7	8 July 2019	National Soccer Stadium, Apia, Samoa	Tuvalu	3–0	13–0	2019 Pacific Games	
8	8 July 2019	National Soccer Stadium, Apia, Samoa	Tuvalu	6–0	13–0	2019 Pacific Games	
9	8 July 2019	National Soccer Stadium, Apia, Samoa	Tuvalu	11–0	13–0	2019 Pacific Games	
10	15 July 2019	National Soccer Stadium, Apia, Samoa	American Samoa	1–0	13–0	2019 Pacific Games	
11	15 July 2019	National Soccer Stadium, Apia, Samoa	American Samoa	3–0	13–0	2019 Pacific Games	
12	15 July 2019	National Soccer Stadium, Apia, Samoa	American Samoa	9–0	13–0	2019 Pacific Games	
13	18 July 2019	National Soccer Stadium, Apia, Samoa	Fiji	2–3	4–4	2019 Pacific Games	
14	23 March 2023	Churchill Park, Lautoka, Fiji	Vanuatu	1–0	2–0	Friendly	
15	26 March 2023	Churchill Park, Lautoka, Fiji	Fiji	1–0	2–0	Friendly	
16	26 March 2023	Churchill Park, Lautoka, Fiji	Fiji	2–0	2–0	Friendly	
17	23 November 2023	Lawson Tama Stadium, Honiara, Solomon Islands	American Samoa	3–0	11–0	2023 Pacific Games	
18	23 November 2023	Lawson Tama Stadium, Honiara, Solomon Islands	American Samoa	6–0	11–0	2023 Pacific Games	
19	23 November 2023	Lawson Tama Stadium, Honiara, Solomon Islands	American Samoa	8–0	11–0	2023 Pacific Games	

== Honours ==
Solomon Islands

- Pacific Games: Silver Medalist, 2023
- Pacific Mini Games: Bronze Medalist, 2017
- MSG Prime Minister's Cup: 2023
