= Joshua Tuasulia =

Solomon Islands footballer

Personal information
- Date of birth: 14 June 1988 (age 38)
- Place of birth: Solomon Islands
- Position: Defender

Team information
- Current team: Marist

Senior career*
Years	Team	Apps	(Gls)
2010	Suva		(1)
2011	Navua		
2011–	Marist		

International career^{‡}
2012	Solomon Islands	2	(0)
- * Club domestic league appearances and goals ‡ National team caps and goals as of 17 June 2018

Joshua Tuasulia (born June 14, 1988) is a Solomon Islands footballer who plays as a defender for Marist. He also made two appearances for the Solomon Islands national team in 2012.

== Playing career ==
He played with Suva in the Fijian National Football League in 2010. His lone goal that year came on 16 May in a 3–0 win over Rewa. He spent the 2011 season with Navua, also in Fiji. From there, he signed with Marist in his native country.

=== International career ===
Tuasulia was called up by the Solomon Islands national team ahead of the 2012 OFC Nations Cup. At the tournament, he made his senior international debut during a 1–1 group stage draw with New Zealand on 6 June 2012, coming on as a 39th minute substitute for an injured Freddie Kini. He earned his second cap a few days later, appearing as a member of the starting lineup in the third-place match, also against New Zealand.

== National team statistics ==
Solomon Islands national team
Year	Apps	Goals
2012	2	0
Total	2	0

== Honours ==
=== Club ===
Marist

- Telekom S-League: 2016
