= Harold Nauania =

Solomon Islanders footballer (born 1997)

Personal information
- Date of birth: October 10, 1997 (age 29)
- Place of birth: Honiara, Solomon Islands
- Position: Goalkeeper

Youth career
- 2016: Marist Fire FC

Senior career*
Years	Team	Apps	(Gls)
2016-2018	Marist Fire		
2019-2020	Isabel United		
2020-	Wangeau United		

International career
	Solomon Islands U20	1	(0)
	Solomon Islands U23	2	(0)
- * Club domestic league appearances and goals

Harold Nauania (born October 10, 1997) is a Solomon Islands professional footballer who plays as a goalkeeper. He currently plays for Waneagu United FC and has made two appearances for the Solomon Islands national team.
