= Bula FC =

Bula FC is the name of:

- Bula FC (Fiji)
- Bula FC (Guinea-Bissau)
