= Jerry Donga =

Solomon Islands footballer

Personal information
- Full name: Jerry Lou Donga
- Date of birth: 31 January 1991 (age 35)
- Place of birth: Solomon Islands
- Position: Forward

Team information
- Current team: Solomon Warriors
- Number: 9

Senior career*
Years	Team	Apps	(Gls)
	Solomon Warriors		(3)

International career^{‡}
2012	Solomon Islands U23	3	(1)
2016–	Solomon Islands	27	(4)
Medal record
Men's football
Representing Solomon Islands
Pacific Mini Games
Bronze medal – third place	2017 Vanuatu
- * Club domestic league appearances and goals ‡ National team caps and goals as of 18 July 2019

Jerry Lou Donga (born 31 January 1991) is a Solomon Islands footballer currently for domestic club Solomon Warriors in Solomon Islands S-League.

== International goals ==
As of match played 2 December 2017. Solomon Islands score listed first, score column indicates score after each Donga goal.

International goals by date, venue, cap, opponent, score, result and competition
No.	Date	Venue	Cap	Opponent	Score	Result	Competition
1	28 May 2016	Sir John Guise Stadium, Port Moresby, Papua New Guinea	1	Vanuatu	1–0	1–0	2016 OFC Nations Cup
2	13 June 2017	PNG Football Stadium, Port Moresby, Papua New Guinea	12	Papua New Guinea	2–1	2–1	2018 FIFA World Cup qualification
3	2 December 2017	Port Vila Municipal Stadium, Port Vila, Vanuatu	15	Tonga	1–0	8–0	2017 Pacific Mini Games
4	8 July 2019	National Soccer Stadium, Apia, Samoa	24	Tuvalu	8–0	13–0	2019 Pacific Games

== Honours ==
Solomon Islands

- Pacific Mini Games: Bronze Medalist, 2017
