= Joses Nawo =

Solomon Islands footballer (born 1988)

Personal information
- Full name: Joses MacPaulson Nawo
- Date of birth: 3 May 1988 (age 38)
- Place of birth: Honiara, Solomon Islands
- Height: 1.74 m (5 ft 9 in)
- Position: Midfielder

Team information
- Current team: Real Kakamora
- Number: 21

Senior career*
Years	Team	Apps	(Gls)
2008–2010	Koloale FC Honiara		
2010	Northern United		
2010–2012	Koloale FC Honiara		
2012–2013	Amicale		
2013–2014	Western United		
2014–2015	Tafea		
2015	Western United		
2015–2016	Amicale		
2016	Hekari United		
2016–2017	Western United		
2017	Ifira Black Bird		
2017–2018	Henderson Eels		
2018	Nalkutan		
2018–2021	Henderson Eels		(60)
2023	Kossa		(7)
2024	ABM Galaxy		
2024–	Real Kakamora		

International career
2011–	Solomon Islands	50	(8)
Medal record
Representing Solomon Islands
Pacific Games
Silver medal – second place	2011 New Caledonia
Silver medal – second place	2023 Solomon Islands
MSG Prime Minister's Cup
Winner	2023 New Caledonia
- * Club domestic league appearances and goals

Joses McPaulson Nawo is a Solomon Islands international footballer who plays as a midfielder for Real Kakamora in the Telekom S-League.

== International career ==
=== International goals ===
Scores and results list Solomon Islands' goal tally first.

No	Date	Venue	Opponent	Score	Result	Competition
1.	27 August 2011	Stade Rivière Salée, Nouméa, New Caledonia	Guam	5–0	7–0	2011 Pacific Games
2.	5 September 2011	Stade Rivière Salée, Nouméa, New Caledonia	New Caledonia	1–0	2–1	2011 Pacific Games
3.	7 September 2011	Stade Hnassé, Lifou, New Caledonia	Fiji	1–1	2–1 (a.e.t.)	2011 Pacific Games
4.	12 October 2012	Lawson Tama Stadium, Honiara, Solomon Islands	New Caledonia	2–2	2–6	2014 FIFA World Cup qualification
5.	24 March 2016	Lawson Tama Stadium, Honiara, Solomon Islands	Papua New Guinea	2–0	2–0	Friendly
6.	18 March 2019	Lawson Tama Stadium, Honiara, Solomon Islands	Vanuatu	3–1	3–1	Friendly
7.	8 July 2019	National Soccer Stadium, Apia, Samoa	Tuvalu	4–0	13–0	2019 Pacific Games
8.	18 June 2023	National Stadium, Kallang, Singapore	Singapore	1–1	1–1	Friendly

== Personal life ==
Joses has a younger brother, called Boni Pride, who also plays for the Solomon Islands national football team.

== Honours ==
Solomon Islands

- Pacific Games: Silver Medalist, 2011, 2023
- MSG Prime Minister's Cup: 2023
