= Football at the 2017 Pacific Mini Games =

Football at the X Pacific Mini Games
- Dates: December 2–15, 2017
- Host city: Port Vila, Vanuatu
- Level: Senior
- Events: 2
- Participation: 354 athletes from 6 nations

Football at the 2017 Pacific Mini Games was held in Port Vila between 2–15 December 2017.

== Entrants ==
Six men's teams and four women's teams participated:

Men's tournament

- Fiji
- New Caledonia
- Solomon Islands
- Tonga
- Tuvalu
- Vanuatu

Women's tournament

- Fiji
- Solomon Islands
- Tonga
- Vanuatu

=== Results ===
Event	Gold	Silver	Bronze
Men	Vanuatu	Fiji	Solomon Islands
Women	Vanuatu	Fiji	Tonga

== See also ==
- Football at the Pacific Games
