= Football in the Solomon Islands =

Football in Solomon islands
- Country: Solomon Islands
- National team: Men’s national team

Club competitions
- Solomon Islands National Club Championship

International competitions
- OFC Champions League; FIFA World Cup

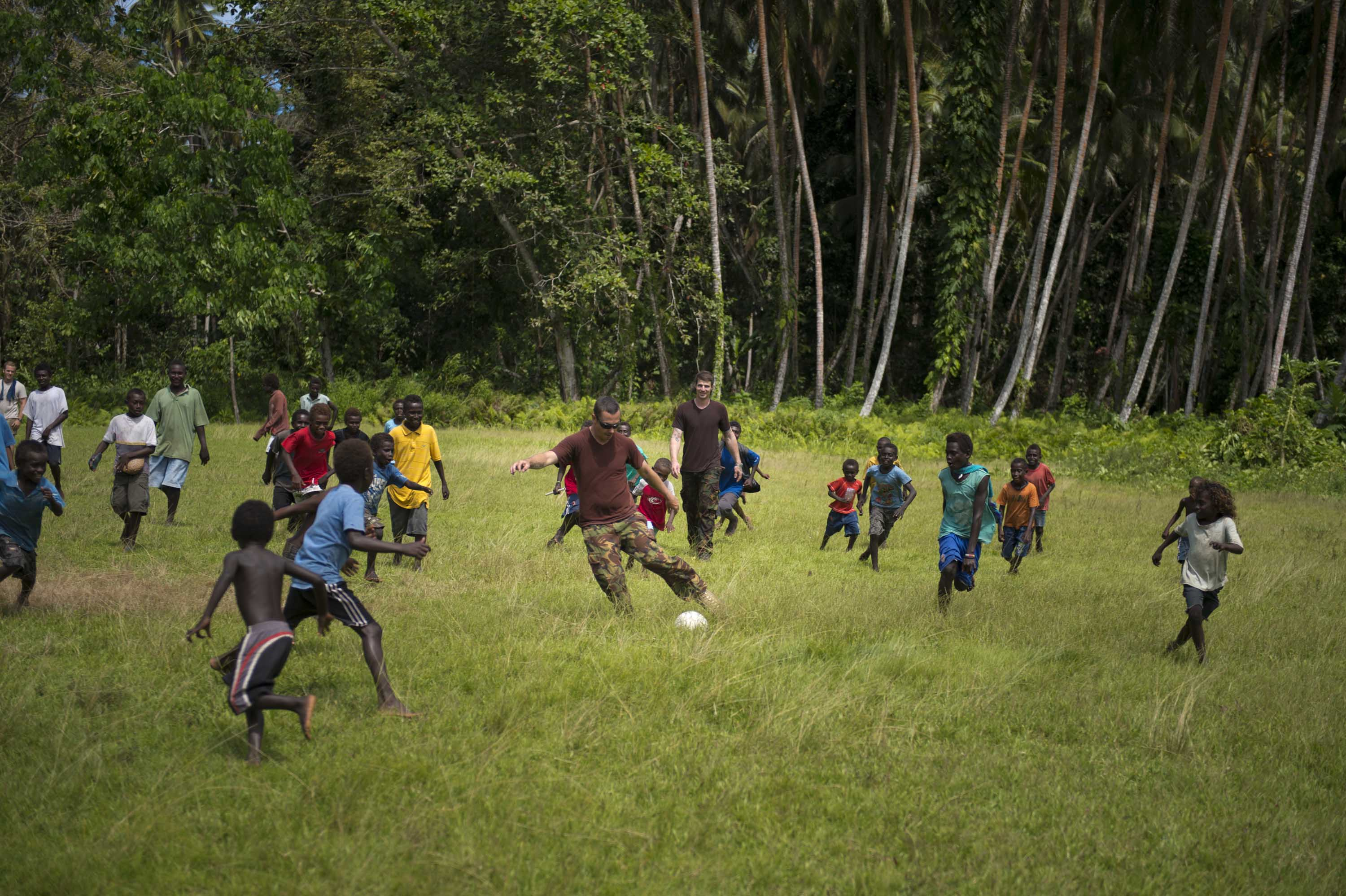
Children playing football in Solomon Islands.

The sport of football in the country of Solomon Islands is run by the Solomon Islands Football Federation (SIFF). The association administers the national football team, as well as the National Club Championship. SIFF was established in 1978 and became a full FIFA member by 1988. Modern day football in the country thrives amongst its numerous domestic competitions.

Football is the leading sport in the Solomon Islands, recognized nationally as the top pastime. The national Futsal team, the Kurukuru, has won the Oceania championship multiple times and regularly competes in the FIFA Futsal World Cup. The beach soccer team, the Bilikiki, has also claimed continental success, securing medals at the OFC Beach Soccer Nations Cup.

SIFF focuses on promoting grassroots football, women's football, and improving infrastructure, especially in preparation for events like the 2023 Pacific Games, which were held in the Solomon Islands. A long-term plan aims to improve governance, infrastructure, and the overall professionalization of the sport at the national and regional levels.

== Football stadiums ==
Stadium	Capacity	City	Tenants	Image
Pacific Games Stadium	10,000	Honiara	Association football: Solomon Islands national football team	

== Attendances ==
The average attendance per top-flight football league season and the club with the highest average attendance:

Season	League average	Best club	Best club average
2024	542	Solomon Warriors	1,435

Source: League page on Wikipedia

== See also ==
- Lists of stadiums
