= Hana F.C. =

Hana
- Full name: Hana Football Club
- Dissolved: c. 2020
- Ground: Lawson Tama Stadium; Honiara
- Capacity: 10,000
- League: Honiara FA Premier League
- 2019–20: 18th of 19

Hana F.C. was a Solomon Islands football club based in Honiara. They played in the Telekom S-League, but withdrew before the 2015–16 season. Their home ground has been the Lawson Tama Stadium. Since then they have played in the Honiara League. but did not appear in the league in 2021.
