= Henderson Eels F.C. =

Henderson Eels
- Full name: Henderson Eels Football Club
- Founded: 2010; 16 years ago
- Ground: Lawson Tama Stadium; Honiara, Solomon Islands
- Capacity: 20,000
- Chairman: William Lai
- Manager: Eddie Marahare
- League: Telekom S-League

Henderson Eels FC is a Solomon Islands professional football club which plays in the Telekom S-League. The club is owned by the managing director of Advance Technology Limited Hudson Wakio and his wife. Until 2017, they played in the Honiara Football League. The club also has a futsal team.

== Achievements ==
- 2020–21 Solomon Islands S-League: Champions

== Futsal team ==
The futsal side plays the SIPA Futsal Challenge and placed last in 2018 in Group B.
