= Solomon Warriors F.C. =

Solomon Warriors
- Full name: Solomon Warriors Football Club Honiara
- Founded: 1981 (As a seven-a-side soccer club)
- Ground: Lawson Tama Stadium; Honiara
- Capacity: 20,000
- Owner: Real Kakamora
- Head coach: Selson Molea
- League: S-League
- 2024: 2nd
Home colours	Away colours

Solomon Warriors FC was a Solomon Islands professional football club based in Honiara. The club played in the Telekom S-League, the top-tier in Solomon Islands football. They played their matches at Lawson Tama Stadium, the biggest stadium in the Solomon Islands.

== History ==
The Solomon Warriors were formerly known as Uncles FC and have also played in the S-League under the name Wantoks. They are the most successful club in the Solomon Islands. They have won the Telekom S-League six times, the most in the Solomon Islands. The club has also played in numerous OFC Champions Leagues.

== Achievements ==
- Melanesian Super Cup
  - Winners (2): 2014, 2015
- S-League
  - Winners (7): 2011–12, 2013–14, 2015-16, 2017, 2018, 2019–20, 2021-22
  - Runners-up (2): 2010–11, 2014–15
- Telekom S-League Championship Series:
  - Winners (2): 2011, 2012
