= Malaita Kingz F.C. =

Association football club in Solomon Islands

Malaita Kingz
- Full name: Malaita Kingz Football Club
- Ground: Lawson Tama Stadium; Honiara
- Capacity: 22,000
- Manager: John Karifau
- Coach: Rence Talo
- League: Telekom S-League
- 2025: 2nd

Malaita Kingz FC is a Solomon Islands professional football club based in Honiara, which plays in the Telekom S-League.
