= Western United FC (Solomon Islands) =

Association football club in Solomon Islands

Western United
- Full name: Western United Football Club
- Founded: 2010; 16 years ago
- Ground: Lawson Tama Stadium; Honiara, Solomon Islands
- Capacity: 22,000
- Owner: Reginald Douglas
- League: Telekom S-League
Home colours	Away colours

Western United FC is a Solomon Islands professional football club based in Honiara, that competes in the Telekom S-League. The club is owned by Reginald Douglas of Douglas Concrete Ltd.

== Achievements ==
- 2011 Telekom S-League, 4th
- 2012 Telekom S-League, 2nd
- 2013/14 Telekom S-League, 3rd
- 2014/15 Telekom S-League, Champions
