= Marist F.C. =

Marist
- Full name: Marist Football Club
- Ground: Lawson Tama Stadium; Honiara, Solomon Islands
- Capacity: 20,000
- Chairman: Graham Korisai
- Manager: Steve Kwaribi
- League: Telekom S-League
- 2025: 7th

Marist Football Club, formerly known as Marist Fire Football Club, is a Solomon Islands professional football club based in Honiara. Their first national trophy was the 2006–07 Solomon Islands National Club Championship. Marist FC use the Lawson Tama Stadium for home games.

Marist FC qualified for the Oceania Club Championship 2006 hosted in Auckland, New Zealand. They were eliminated in the group stage of the tournament.

== Titles ==
- Telekom S-League
  - Champions (3): 2006, 2009, 2016

== Performance in OFC competitions ==
- OFC Champions League: 3 appearances

2nd in Group D 2017
2007: 3rd in Group B
2010: 4th in Group B
2017: 2nd in Group D

- Oceania Club Championship: 1 appearance

2006
