= Moses Toata =

Solomon Islander footballer (born 1975)

Personal information
- Full name: Moses Hedley Toata
- Date of birth: 10 October 1975 (age 51)
- Place of birth: Honiara, Solomon Islands
- Height: 5 ft 7 in (1.70 m)
- Position: Left midfielder

Team information
- Current team: Solomon Islands Football Federation (Technical Director)

Senior career*
Years	Team	Apps	(Gls)
1992–1994	Naha FC	34	(28)
1997–2010	Kossa^{[Note 1]}	22	(24)

International career
1996	Solomon Islands U-23 Olympics team	12	(6)
1997–2004	Solomon Islands	14	(1)

Managerial career
- 2007– 2010: Kossa
- 2012–2019: Solomon Warriors
- 2015–2016: Solomon Islands
- 2018–2019: Solomon Islands
Medal record
Men's football
Representing Solomon Islands
OFC Nations Cup
Runner-up	2004 Australia
Third place	2000 Tahiti
- * Club domestic league appearances and goals

Moses Hedley Toata (born 10 October 1975) is Solomon Islander football manager and former player. He is currently the technical director of the Solomon Islands Football Federation.

For nearly a year Toata managed the Solomon Islands national team before stepping down in July 2016. As a player, Toata made 10 appearances for the national team and scored one goal as a midfielder. At club level, he played for Kossa for his entire career. He has won the Solomon Islands S-League as both a player and a manager.

== Club career ==
Toata made his senior football debut in 1994 playing for Sunbeam FC in the Honiara Premier League while attending Betikama High School. In 1996 he transferred to Naha FC and after two successful season with Naha FC winning 2 back to back league titles, he left Naha FC at the end of 1997 season. Toata also appeared as guest player for Laugh FC in the OFC Club Championship in Noumea, New Caledonia in 1997. Toata's move to Kossa. was finalised in December 1997 where he played primarily as a midfielder and striker, Toata played for Kossa until the 2009–10 season. He was part of the 2006–07 S-League winning squad, Kossa's only S-League win.

== International career ==
Toata joined the Solomon Islands U23 Olympics team in 1995 and was part of the team that competed in the OFC U23 Olympic qualifiers in Adelaide in 1996. Toata's first inclusion in the national team squad was in June 1997 for the second round of OFC qualification for the 1998 FIFA World Cup. He was on the bench in a 13–0 loss to Australia but was not substituted on. On 15 June 1997, Toata made his international football debut. He was substituted on for George Kiriau at half time in a 4–1 win against Tahiti. He then went on to score his first international goal in the 89th minute. Toata went on to make nine more appearances, scoring no goals, for the national team, with his last appearance in 2004.

== Managerial career ==
=== Solomon Warriors ===
On 1 July 2012, Toata was appointed manager of Solomon Islands S-League side Solomon Warriors. In his first season in charge, the Solomon Warriors won the S-League. They also competed in the 2012–13 OFC Champions League where they finished third in their group and therefore did not advance to the knockout rounds.

In the following season his team feature in three competitions. The S-league, the OFC Champions League and the Melanesian Super Cup. In the league Solomon Warriors finished second, one point behind Western United. At the OFC Champions league, the highest level of Oceanian football, Solomon Warriors played three games, winning against Vailima Kiwi FC 8–0, drawing with Waitakere United 1–1 and losing to A.S. Pirae 2–1 and finished third in their group, missing out on the knockout rounds by one place. In the Melanesian Super Cup, Solomon Warriors won the tournament, beating Tafea F.C. and Amicale F.C. in a three-team competition.

In the 2015–16 season, Solomon Warriors won the S League, Totoa's second S-League title as a coach. His team retained their Melanesian Super Cup title, topping the table in a four-team competition. They beat Amicale F.C., Erakor Golden Star and Western United, winning against all three teams. Toata continued to lead the Warriors to win 3 more TSL titles in 2016, 2017 and 2018, with the 2018 TSL title as his final club season with Solomon Warriors. In total Toata has won 5 TSL titles with Solomon Warriors before he was appointed as the Technical Director of the Solomon Islands Football Federation.

=== Solomon Islands ===
Toata was appointed the manager of the Solomon Islands national team on 16 October 2015, replacing Jacob Moli. Toata's first game in charge was a friendly against Papua New Guinea on 24 March 2016 and the team won 2–1. His team played another friendly against the same team three days later but, this time, they lost 2–1.

Toata's first major international tournament was the 2016 OFC Nations Cup. Solomon Islands were drawn in group B along with New Zealand, Fiji and Vanuatu. In their first match they beat Vanuatu 1–0 with Jerry Donga scoring a goal in the 19th minute. They then lost 1–0 to both New Zealand and Fiji. After all the group B fixtures were completed New Zealand finished top with nine points. Solomon Islands, Fiji and Vanuatu all finished on three points. Solomon Island's goal difference of −1 was better than Fiji's −2 and Vanuatu's −5 so they finished second. This meant they qualified for the semi-finals, where they played the winner of group A, Papua New Guinea, as well as qualifying for the third round of OFC qualifying for the 2018 FIFA World Cup. In the game against Papua New Guinea, Solomon Islands lost 2–1 with an 82nd minute Nigel Dabinyaba goal knocking Toata's team out of the competition.

In July 2016 Toata wanted to step down as head coach of the national team. Before stepping down, he led the Solomon Island into the World Cup Preliminary qualifying round against Tahiti and Papua New Guinea. In November 2019 Toata's Solomon Islands lost 3–0 away to Tahiti but return home to beat Tahiti on home soil by 1 goal to zero only six days later. He was replaced by Spaniard Felipe Vega Arango as interim Coach and Solomon Islands went on to beat PNG to earn a two legged play off with New Zealand losing away and drawing at home.

In 2018 Toata returned on interim base to lead the Solomon Islands in two international friendly matches, beating Macau 1-4 and drew with Fiji 1–1 in Suva. In March 2019 Toata led Solomon Islands to beat Vanuatu 3–1 in an International friendly at home and later on in the same month went on to beat Chinese Taipei 0–1 in Taipei. Toata continued as interim coach until April 2019, when he was named as the Technical Director of the Solomon Islands football Federation. As a head coach he was replaced by Dutch coach Wim Rijsbergen.

In 2024, Toata coached the Solomon Islands U16 team at the OFC U16 Preliminary tournament in Tonga and qualified top of the group after smashing all the teams they played Solomon islands beat PNG 14 goals to nil, American Samoa 9 goals to nil and Tonga 5 goals in the final match Toata the released the team to Eddie Rukumana who took ovet as coach, but missed out on an important campaign to qualify for the women national team management

Moses was once again appointed in March 2025 to lead the Women's Senior team to FiJi where they play the likes of Fiji, Samoa, Tonga and Vanuatu in popl B first match . In Suva, Fiji, the Solomon Islanders lost 2-1 to Fiji, but beat Tonga 5-1, Beat Vanuatu 2-1 and Samoa in the semi-final 2-1. Solomon islands contineus its winning in spree by Beating Champions PNG - 3-2.

== Honours ==
Solomon Islands

- OFC Nations Cup: Runner-up, 2004; 3rd place 2000

== Notes ==
For the 2004 and 2005–06 seasons Kossa F.C. was known as Fairwest F.C.
