= Solomon Islands national football team results (2000–present) =

This page details the match results and statistics of the Solomon Islands national football team from 2000 to present.

== Key ==
Key to matches

- Att.=Match attendance
- (H)=Home ground
- (A)=Away ground
- (N)=Neutral ground

Key to record by opponent

- Pld=Games played
- W=Games won
- D=Games drawn
- L=Games lost
- GF=Goals for
- GA=Goals against

== Results ==
Solomon Islands' score is shown first in each case.

No.	Date	Venue	Opponents	Score	Competition	Solomon Islands scorers	Att.	Ref.
92	8 April 2000	Suva (N)	New Caledonia	2–4	2000 Melanesia Cup	B. Suri, Berry	—	
93	10 April 2000	Suva (N)	Vanuatu	2–1	2000 Melanesia Cup	Berry, Daudau	—	
94	13 April 2000	Suva (N)	Papua New Guinea	4–2	2000 Melanesia Cup	Samani, Berry, Daudau (2)	—	
95	15 April 2000	Suva (N)	Fiji	2–2	2000 Melanesia Cup	B. Suri, Daudau	—	
96	21 June 2000	Stade Pater Te Hono Nui, Pirae (N)	Cook Islands	5–1	2000 OFC Nations Cup	B. Suri, Menapi, Samani, Omokirio, Koto	—	
97	23 June 2000	Stade Pater Te Hono Nui, Pirae (N)	Australia	0–6	2000 OFC Nations Cup		—	
98	25 June 2000	Stade Pater Te Hono Nui, Pirae (N)	New Zealand	0–2	2000 OFC Nations Cup		—	
99	28 June 2000	Stade Pater Te Hono Nui, Pirae (N)	Vanuatu	2–1	2000 OFC Nations Cup	Menapi, Omokirio	—	
100	4 June 2001	North Harbour Stadium, Auckland (N)	Cook Islands	9–1	2002 FIFA World Cup qualification	B. Suri, Daudau (3), Menapi (3), Firisua, Konofilla	1,542	
101	8 June 2001	North Harbour Stadium, Auckland (N)	Vanuatu	7–2	2002 FIFA World Cup qualification	Wickham (2), Menapi (2), Waita, Samani, B. Suri	1,674	
102	11 June 2001	North Harbour Stadium, Auckland (N)	New Zealand	1–5	2002 FIFA World Cup qualification	B. Suri	2,500	
103	13 June 2001	North Harbour Stadium, Auckland (N)	Tahiti	0–2	2002 FIFA World Cup qualification		250	
104	5 July 2002	North Harbour Stadium, Auckland (N)	Papua New Guinea	0–0	2002 OFC Nations Cup		1,000	
105	7 July 2002	North Harbour Stadium, Auckland (N)	Tahiti	2–3	2002 OFC Nations Cup	Daudau, Menapi	1,000	
106	9 July 2002	North Harbour Stadium, Auckland (N)	New Zealand	1–6	2002 OFC Nations Cup	Fa'arodo	1,000	
107	14 June 2003	Port Moresby (A)	Papua New Guinea	5–3	Friendly	Samani, Menapi (2), Mehau, B. Suri	4,000	
108	1 July 2003	National Stadium, Suva (N)	Vanuatu	2–2	2003 South Pacific Games	Menapi (2)	—	
109	3 July 2003	National Stadium, Suva (N)	Kiribati	7–0	2003 South Pacific Games	Waita, Menapi (5), Mehau	400	
110	5 July 2003	Ratu Cakobau Park, Nausori (N)	Tuvalu	4–0	2003 South Pacific Games	Maniadalo, Menapi (2), B. Suri	2,500	
111	7 July 2003	Churchill Park, Lautoka (N)	Fiji	1–2	2003 South Pacific Games	Menapi	6,000	
112	4 April 2004	Port Vila (A)	Vanuatu	2–1	Friendly	Menapi (2)	—	
113	6 April 2004	Port Vila (A)	Vanuatu	2–1	Friendly	B. Suri, Menapi	—	
114	10 May 2004	Lawson Tama Stadium, Honiara (N)	Tonga	6–0	2006 FIFA World Cup qualification	Fa'arodo (3), Maemae (2), Samani	12,385	
115	12 May 2004	Lawson Tama Stadium, Honiara (N)	Cook Islands	5–0	2006 FIFA World Cup qualification	Waita, Omorokio, Samani, Maemae, Leo	14,000	
116	15 May 2004	Lawson Tama Stadium, Honiara (N)	New Caledonia	2–0	2006 FIFA World Cup qualification	Omorokio, G. Suri	20,000	
117	19 May 2004	Lawson Tama Stadium, Honiara (N)	Tahiti	1–1	2006 FIFA World Cup qualification	B. Suri	18,000	
118	29 May 2004	Marden Sports Complex, Adelaide (N)	Vanuatu	1–0	2004 OFC Nations Cup	B. Suri	200	
119	31 May 2004	Marden Sports Complex, Adelaide (N)	New Zealand	0–3	2004 OFC Nations Cup		217	
120	2 June 2004	Hindmarsh Stadium, Adelaide (N)	Tahiti	4–0	2004 OFC Nations Cup	Fa'arodo, Menapi (2), B. Suri	50	
121	4 June 2004	Hindmarsh Stadium, Adelaide (N)	Fiji	2–1	2004 OFC Nations Cup	Kakai, Houkarawa	1,500	
122	6 June 2004	Hindmarsh Stadium, Adelaide (N)	Australia	2–2	2004 OFC Nations Cup	Menapi (2)	3,500	
123	9 October 2004	Lawson Tama Stadium, Honiara (H)	Australia	1–5	2004 OFC Nations Cup	B. Suri	21,000	
124	12 October 2004	Sydney Football Stadium, Sydney (A)	Australia	0–6	2004 OFC Nations Cup		19,208	
125	3 September 2005	Sydney Football Stadium, Sydney (A)	Australia	0–7	2006 FIFA World Cup qualification		16,000	
126	6 September 2005	Lawson Tama Stadium, Honiara (H)	Australia	1–2	2006 FIFA World Cup qualification	Fa'arodo	16,000	
127	13 July 2007	Lawson Tama Stadium, Honiara (H)	Papua New Guinea	2–1	Friendly	Iniga, Maemae	—	
128	25 August 2007	Toleofoa Joseph Blatter Soccer Complex, Apia (N)	American Samoa	12–1	2007 South Pacific Games	Totori (2), Menapi (4), Fa'arodo, Waita (2), Bebeu, Molea, Takayama	300	
129	27 August 2007	Toleofoa Joseph Blatter Soccer Complex, Apia (N)	Tonga	4–0	2007 South Pacific Games	Menapi (2), Fa'arodo, Maemae	350	
130	1 September 2007	Toleofoa Joseph Blatter Soccer Complex, Apia (N)	Vanuatu	2–0	2007 South Pacific Games	Bebeu, Fa'arodo	1,000	
131	3 September 2007	Toleofoa Joseph Blatter Soccer Complex, Apia (N)	Samoa	3–0	2007 South Pacific Games	Totori (2), Maemae	200	
132	5 September 2007	Toleofoa Joseph Blatter Soccer Complex, Apia (N)	New Caledonia	2–3	2007 South Pacific Games	Fa'arodo, Menapi	1,500	
133	7 September 2007	Toleofoa Joseph Blatter Soccer Complex, Apia (N)	Vanuatu	0–2	2007 South Pacific Games		200	
134	7 July 2008	Solomon Islands (H)	Vanuatu	1–2	Friendly	Unknown	—	
135	7 July 2011	Lawson Tama Stadium, Honiara (H)	Vanuatu	2–1	Friendly	Luwi, Totori	—	
136	9 July 2011	Lawson Tama Stadium, Honiara (H)	Vanuatu	0–0	Friendly		—	
137	27 July 2011	Korman Stadium, Port Vila (A)	Vanuatu	0–0	Friendly		6,000	
138	30 July 2011	Korman Stadium, Port Vila (A)	Vanuatu	0–2	Friendly		3,000	
139	27 August 2011	Stade Rivière Salée, Nouméa (N)	Guam	7–0	2011 Pacific Games	Fa'arodo (2), Totori (3), Nawo, Paia	—	
140	30 August 2011	Stade Rivière Salée, Nouméa (N)	American Samoa	4–0	2011 Pacific Games	Totori, Bule, Luwi (2)	—	
141	1 September 2011	Stade Rivière Salée, Nouméa (N)	Vanuatu	0–1	2011 Pacific Games		—	
142	3 September 2011	Stade Rivière Salée, Nouméa (N)	Tuvalu	6–1	2011 Pacific Games	Totori (2) Luwi, Naka (2), Faisi	—	
143	5 September 2011	Stade Rivière Salée, Nouméa (N)	New Caledonia	2–1	2011 Pacific Games	Nawo, Naka	—	
144	7 September 2011	Stade Hnassé, Lifou (N)	Fiji	2–1 (a.e.t.)	2011 Pacific Games	Nawo, Fa'arodo	—	
145	9 September 2011	Stade Numa-Daly Magenta, Nouméa (N)	New Caledonia	0–2	2011 Pacific Games		—	
146	2 June 2012	Lawson Tama Stadium, Honiara (N)	Papua New Guinea	1–0	2012 OFC Nations Cup	Totori	15,000	
147	4 June 2012	Lawson Tama Stadium, Honiara (N)	Fiji	0–0	2012 OFC Nations Cup		12,000	
148	6 June 2012	Lawson Tama Stadium, Honiara (N)	New Zealand	1–1	2012 OFC Nations Cup	Totori	18,000	
149	8 June 2012	Lawson Tama Stadium, Honiara (N)	Tahiti	0–1	2012 OFC Nations Cup		15,000	
150	10 June 2012	Lawson Tama Stadium, Honiara (N)	New Zealand	3–4	2012 OFC Nations Cup	Teleda, Totori (2)	15,000	
151	7 September 2012	Lawson Tama Stadium, Honiara (H)	Tahiti	2–0	2014 FIFA World Cup qualification	Fa'arodo, Teleda	22,000	
152	11 September 2012	North Harbour Stadium, Auckland (A)	New Zealand	1–6	2014 FIFA World Cup qualification	Fa'arodo	7,931	
153	12 October 2012	Lawson Tama Stadium, Honiara (H)	New Caledonia	2–6	2014 FIFA World Cup qualification	Tanito, Nawo	8,000	
154	16 October 2012	Stade Numa-Daly Magenta, Nouméa (A)	New Caledonia	0–5	2014 FIFA World Cup qualification		4,000	
155	22 March 2013	Stade Pater Te Hono Nui, Pirae (A)	Tahiti	0–2	2014 FIFA World Cup qualification		550	
156	26 March 2013	Lawson Tama Stadium, Honiara (H)	New Zealand	0–2	2014 FIFA World Cup qualification		5,600	
157	24 March 2016	Lawson Tama Stadium, Honiara (H)	Papua New Guinea	2–0	Friendly	Totori, Nawo	—	
158	27 March 2016	Lawson Tama Stadium, Honiara (H)	Papua New Guinea	1–2	Friendly	Lea'alafa	—	
159	28 May 2016	Sir John Guise Stadium, Port Moresby (N)	Vanuatu	1–0	2016 OFC Nations Cup	Donga	1,611	
160	31 May 2016	Sir John Guise Stadium, Port Moresby (N)	Fiji	0–1	2016 OFC Nations Cup		798	
161	4 June 2016	Sir John Guise Stadium, Port Moresby (N)	New Zealand	0–1	2016 OFC Nations Cup		1,925	
162	8 June 2016	Sir John Guise Stadium, Port Moresby (N)	Papua New Guinea	1–2	2016 OFC Nations Cup	Molea	3,548	
163	5 October 2016	Lawson Tama Stadium, Honiara (H)	New Caledonia	0–3	Friendly		—	
164	8 October 2016	Lawson Tama Stadium, Honiara (H)	New Caledonia	0–1	Friendly		—	
165	7 November 2016	Stade Pater Te Hono Nui, Pirae (A)	Tahiti	0–3	2018 FIFA World Cup qualification		2,200	
166	13 November 2016	Lawson Tama Stadium, Honiara (H)	Tahiti	1–0	2018 FIFA World Cup qualification	Poila	5,000	
167	25 May 2017	Prince Charles Park, Nadi (A)	Fiji	1–1	Friendly	Lea'alafa	—	
168	28 May 2017	Churchill Park, Lautoka (A)	Fiji	0–1	Friendly		2,500	
169	9 June 2017	Lawson Tama Stadium, Honiara (H)	Papua New Guinea	3–2	2018 FIFA World Cup qualification	Kaua, Totori, Lea'alafa	14,700	
170	13 June 2017	PNG Football Stadium, Port Moresby (A)	Papua New Guinea	2–1	2018 FIFA World Cup qualification	Fa'arodo, Donga	2,035	
171	28 July 2017	Lawson Tama Stadium, Honiara (H)	Vanuatu	0–0	Friendly		20,000	
172	1 September 2017	North Harbour Stadium, Auckland (A)	New Zealand	1–6	2018 FIFA World Cup qualification	Fa'arodo	10,230	
173	5 September 2017	Lawson Tama Stadium, Honiara (H)	New Zealand	2–2	2018 FIFA World Cup qualification	Lea'alafa, Fa'arodo	10,200	
174	2 December 2017	Port Vila Municipal Stadium, Port Vila (N)	Tonga	8–0	2017 Pacific Mini Games	Donga, Totori (2), Mara (2), Feni (2), Tanito	1,000	
175	6 December 2017	Korman Stadium, Port Vila (N)	Fiji	0–0	2017 Pacific Mini Games		4,000	
176	9 December 2017	Port Vila Municipal Stadium, Port Vila (N)	Tuvalu	6–0	2017 Pacific Mini Games	Fa'arodo, Mara (2), Bule, Feni, Totori	1,500	
177	12 December 2017	Korman Stadium, Port Vila (N)	New Caledonia	1–0	2017 Pacific Mini Games	Kaua	2,500	
178	15 December 2017	Port Vila Municipal Stadium, Port Vila (N)	Vanuatu	2–3	2017 Pacific Mini Games	Totori, Fa'arodo	6,000	
179	29 August 2018	Macau Olympic Complex, Taipa (A)	Macau	4–1	Friendly	Molea, Kaua, Hou, Totori	—	
180	5 September 2018	National Stadium, Suva (A)	Fiji	1–1	Friendly	Lea'alafa	4,200	
181	18 March 2019	Lawson Tama Stadium, Honiara (H)	Vanuatu	3–1	Friendly	Ifunaoa, Lea'alafa, Nawo	—	
182	24 March 2019	Taipei Municipal Stadium, Taipei (A)	Chinese Taipei	1–0	Friendly	Totori	—	
183	8 June 2019	National Stadium, Singapore (A)	Singapore	3–4	Friendly	Feni, Abba, Totori	—	
184	8 July 2019	National Soccer Stadium, Apia (N)	Tuvalu	13–0	2019 Pacific Games	Feni (5), Nawo, Totori (2), Donga, Kaua, Tanito (2), Hou	300	
185	10 July 2019	National Soccer Stadium, Apia (N)	New Caledonia	0–2	2019 Pacific Games		1,000	
186	12 July 2019	National Soccer Stadium, Apia (N)	Tahiti	0–3	2019 Pacific Games		200	
187	15 July 2019	National Soccer Stadium, Apia (N)	American Samoa	13–0	2019 Pacific Games	Feni (3), Ledoux (o.g.), Totori, Abba (4), Ifunaoa (3), Taroga	400	
188	18 July 2019	National Soccer Stadium, Apia (N)	Fiji	4–4	2019 Pacific Games	Ifunaoa, Feni, Totori (2)	1,000	
189	17 March 2022	Al Arabi Stadium, Doha (N)	Cook Islands	2–0	Friendly	Kaua, Hou	—	
—	20 March 2022	Al Arabi Stadium, Doha (N)	Vanuatu	–	2022 FIFA World Cup qualification		—	
190	24 March 2022	Al Arabi Stadium, Doha (N)	Tahiti	3–1	2022 FIFA World Cup qualification	Lea'i (3)	—	
191	27 March 2022	Al Arabi Stadium, Doha (N)	Papua New Guinea	3–2	2022 FIFA World Cup qualification	Hou (2), Lea'i	—	
192	30 March 2022	Al Arabi Stadium, Doha (N)	New Zealand	0–5	2022 FIFA World Cup qualification		—	
193	21 September 2022	Luganville Soccer Stadium, Luganville (N)	New Caledonia	1–0	2022 MSG Prime Minister's Cup	Hou	—	
194	24 September 2022	Luganville Soccer Stadium, Luganville (N)	Fiji	2–2	2022 MSG Prime Minister's Cup	Lea'i, Lea'alafa	—	
195	30 September 2022	Luganville Soccer Stadium, Luganville (N)	Fiji	0–1	2022 MSG Prime Minister's Cup		—	
196	23 March 2023	Churchill Park, Lautoka (N)	Vanuatu	2–0	Friendly	Feni, Komasi	—	
197	26 March 2023	Churchill Park, Lautoka (A)	Fiji	0–2	Friendly		—	
198	14 June 2023	Sultan Mizan Zainal Abidin Stadium, Kuala Nerus (A)	Malaysia	1–4	Friendly	Lea'i	—	
199	18 June 2023	National Stadium, Singapore (A)	Singapore	1–1	Friendly	Nawo	—	
200	8 October 2023	Stade Numa-Daly Magenta, Nouméa (N)	Papua New Guinea	3–1	2023 MSG Prime Minister's Cup	Lea'i (3)	—	
201	11 October 2023	Stade Yoshida, Koné (N)	Vanuatu	1–0	2023 MSG Prime Minister's Cup	Leslie	—	
202	14 October 2023	Stade Numa-Daly Magenta, Nouméa (N)	New Caledonia	1–0	2023 MSG Prime Minister's Cup	Lea'i	—	
203	17 November 2023	Lawson Tama Stadium, Honiara (N)	Samoa	1–0	2023 Pacific Games	Orobulu	—	
204	23 November 2023	Lawson Tama Stadium, Honiara (N)	American Samoa	11–0	2023 Pacific Games	Orobulu (5), Leslie, Feni (3), Molea (2)	—	
205	28 November 2023	Lawson Tama Stadium, Honiara (N)	Fiji	2–0	2023 Pacific Games	Lea'i, Lea'alafa	—	
206	2 December 2023	National Stadium, Honiara (N)	New Caledonia	2–2 (6–7p)	2023 Pacific Games	Orobulu (2)	—	
207	18 March 2024	Lawson Tama Stadium, Honiara (H)	Fiji	2–1	Friendly	Molea, Hou	—	
208	21 March 2024	Lawson Tama Stadium, Honiara (H)	Fiji	0–2	Friendly		—	
209	15 June 2024	VFF Freshwater Stadium, Port Vila (N)	Vanuatu	0–1	2024 OFC Nations Cup		5,000	
210	18 June 2024	VFF Freshwater Stadium, Port Vila (N)	New Zealand	0–3	2024 OFC Nations Cup		3,000	
211	2 September 2024	National Stadium, Suva (A)	Fiji	0–1	Friendly		—	
212	5 September 2024	National Stadium, Suva (N)	Hong Kong	0–3	Friendly		—	
213	10 October 2024	National Stadium, Suva (N)	Fiji	0–1	2026 FIFA World Cup qualification		2,000	
214	14 November 2024	PNG Football Stadium, Port Moresby (N)	New Caledonia	2–3	2026 FIFA World Cup qualification	Lea'i, Wae	1,000	
215	17 November 2024	PNG Football Stadium, Port Moresby (N)	Papua New Guinea	2–1	2026 FIFA World Cup qualification	David, Lea'alafa	1,284	
216	9 December 2024	Lawson Tama Stadium, Honiara (N)	Vanuatu	4–1	2024 MSG Prime Minister's Cup	Boyers (2), Keana (2)	—	
217	18 December 2024	National Stadium, Honiara (N)	Papua New Guinea	2–3	2024 MSG Prime Minister's Cup	Boyers, Keana	—	
218	21 December 2024	Lawson Tama Stadium, Honiara (N)	Fiji	1–3	2024 MSG Prime Minister's Cup	Kaua	—	
219	13 November 2025	PNG Football Stadium, Port Moresby (N)	Papua New Guinea	0–1	2025 MSG Prime Minister's Cup		—	
220	20 November 2025	PNG Football Stadium, Port Moresby (N)	Vanuatu	1–2	2025 MSG Prime Minister's Cup	Supa	—	
—	22 November 2025	PNG Football Stadium, Port Moresby (N)	Fiji	1–1 (abandoned)	2025 MSG Prime Minister's Cup	Boyers	—	
221	27 March 2026	Gelora Bung Karno Stadium, Jakarta (N)	Bulgaria	2–10	2026 FIFA Series	Lea'i (2)	2,248	
222	30 March 2026	Gelora Bung Karno Stadium, Jakarta (N)	Saint Kitts and Nevis	2–4	2026 FIFA Series	Keana, Fordney	—	

Notes

1. A: The 2000 Melanesia Cup doubled as qualifiers for the 2000 OFC Nations Cup.
2. B: The first round of Oceanian qualifiers for the 2006 FIFA World Cup doubled as qualifiers for the 2004 OFC Nations Cup.
3. C: The 2004 OFC Nations Cup group stage doubled as the second round of qualifiers for the 2006 FIFA World Cup.
4. D: The men's football tournament at the 2007 South Pacific Games doubled as qualifiers for the 2008 OFC Nations Cup and the first round of qualifiers for the 2010 FIFA World Cup.
5. E: The 2012 OFC Nations Cup doubled as the second round of qualifiers for the 2014 FIFA World Cup.
6. F: The 2016 OFC Nations Cup doubled as the second round of qualifiers for the 2018 FIFA World Cup.
7. G: FIFA awarded Tahiti a 3–0 win as a result of the Solomon Islands fielding the ineligible player Henry Fa'arodo, after Tahiti had defeated the Solomon Islands 1–0. Henry Fa'arodo failed to serve a one-game ban after receiving two yellow cards in the 2016 OFC Nations Cup.
8. H: This match was played as a qualifier for the 2022 FIFA World Cup, but redesignated as a friendly after the Cook Islands withdrew from the competition due to a COVID-19 outbreak in their squad.
9. I: The Solomon Islands' match against Vanuatu during qualifying for the 2022 FIFA World Cup was cancelled due to an outbreak of COVID-19 among the Vanuatu squad.
10. J: Match abandoned at half time due to rain.

== Record by opponent ==
Team	Pld	W	D	L	GF	GA	GD	WPCT
American Samoa	4	4	0	0	40	1	+39	100.00
Australia	6	0	1	5	4	28	−24	0.00
Bulgaria	1	0	0	1	2	10	−8	0.00
Chinese Taipei	1	1	0	0	1	0	+1	100.00
Cook Islands	4	4	0	0	21	2	+19	100.00
Fiji	20	4	7	9	20	27	−7	20.00
Guam	1	1	0	0	7	0	+7	100.00
Hong Kong	1	0	0	1	0	3	−3	0.00
Kiribati	1	1	0	0	7	0	+7	100.00
Macau	1	1	0	0	4	1	+3	100.00
Malaysia	1	0	0	1	1	4	−3	0.00
New Caledonia	15	5	1	9	17	32	−15	33.33
New Zealand	13	0	2	11	10	46	−36	0.00
Papua New Guinea	16	10	2	4	32	22	+10	62.50
Saint Kitts and Nevis	1	0	0	1	2	4	−2	0.00
Samoa	2	2	0	0	4	0	+4	100.00
Singapore	2	0	1	1	4	5	−1	0.00
Tahiti	11	4	1	6	13	16	−3	36.36
Tonga	3	3	0	0	18	0	+18	100.00
Tuvalu	4	4	0	0	29	1	+28	100.00
Vanuatu	24	13	4	7	37	24	+13	54.17
Total	132	57	19	56	273	226	+47	43.18

Source: Results
