= 2008–09 Solomon Islands National Club Championship =

2008–09 National Club Championship
- Season: 2008–09
- Champions: Marist FC
- Matches played: 34
- Goals scored: 162 (4.76 per match)

The 2008–09 Solomon Islands National Club Championship was the 6th season of the National Club Championship in the Solomon Islands. Marist F.C. won the league for the second time. All matches were played at the hillside ground called Lawson Tama Stadium, with an approximate capacity of 20,000.

== Teams ==
- Banika Bulls
- Fasi Roos
- Gossa
- Koloale
- KOSSA
- Makuru
- Malango
- Malu'u United
- Marist
- Soloso
- Sunbeam
- Uncles FC

== Pools ==
=== Pool A ===
Pos	Team	Pld	W	D	L	GF	GA	GD	Pts	Qualification
1	Koloale FC (Q)	5	4	0	1	26	4	+22	12	Qualified for the semifinals
2	Marist (Q)	5	4	0	1	18	7	+11	12	Qualified for the semifinals
3	Sunbeam FC	5	3	0	2	12	12	0	9	
4	Fasi Roos	5	1	1	3	6	12	−6	4	
5	Soloso FC	5	1	1	3	6	23	−17	4	
6	Malango FC	5	0	2	3	6	16	−10	2	

(Q) Qualified for the phase indicated

=== Pool B ===
Pos	Team	Pld	W	D	L	GF	GA	GD	Pts	Qualification
1	Uncles FC (Q)	5	4	1	0	18	7	+11	13	Qualified for the semifinals
2	Makuru (Q)	5	3	2	0	14	5	+9	11	Qualified for the semifinals
3	KOSSA	5	3	1	1	18	3	+15	10	
4	Banika Bulls	5	2	0	3	8	23	−15	6	
5	Malu'u United	5	1	0	4	10	0	+10	3	
6	Gossa FC	5	0	0	5	7	17	−10	0	

(Q) Qualified for the phase indicated

== Knockout stage ==
=== Semi-finals ===
8 June 2009

Koloale	2-1	Makuru

Lawson Tama Stadium, Honiara
8 June 2009

Uncles FC	1-1 (p. 3-4)	Marist FC

Lawson Tama Stadium, Honiara

=== Third place match ===
10 June 2009

Uncles FC	4-3	Makuru

Lawson Tama Stadium, Honiara

=== Final ===
10 June 2009

Koloale	0-1	Marist FC

Lawson Tama Stadium, Honiara
