= Benjamin Totori =

Solomon Islands footballer (born 1986)

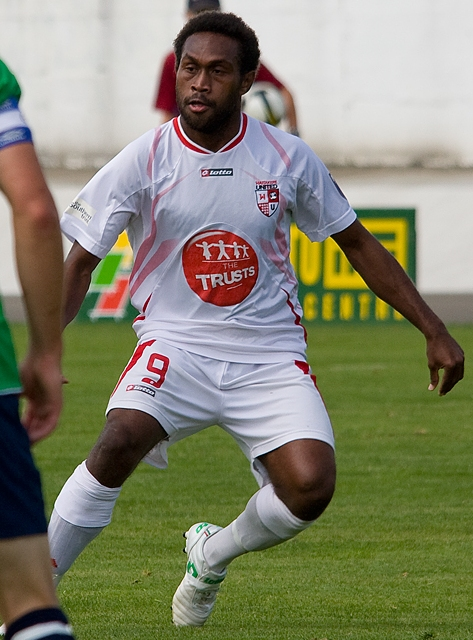
- Totori with Waitakere United in 2009

Personal information
- Full name: Benjamin Totori
- Date of birth: 20 February 1986 (age 40)
- Place of birth: Fishing Village, Honiara, Solomon Islands
- Height: 1.67 m (5 ft 6 in)
- Position: Striker

Senior career*
Years	Team	Apps	(Gls)
2004–2005	Uncles	19	(21)
2005	Nasinu		
2005–2007	YoungHeart Manawatu	41	(32)
2007	Richmond Athletic	4	(4)
2007–2008	Waitakere United	19	(10)
2008	Portland Timbers	3	(0)
2008–2010	Waitakere United	29	(14)
2010–2012	Koloale	19	(23)
2012–2013	Wellington Phoenix	15	(0)
2013	Oakleigh Cannons	0	(0)
2013–2014	Western United		(3)
2014	Waitakere United	0	(0)
2014–2017	Western United		
2017	Three Kings United	3	(0)
2017–2018	Western United	1	(0)
2018–2019	Lautoka	23	(11)
2019	Solomon Warriors	7	(5)
2020	Ba		
2020	Isabel United	12	(6)
2021	Solomon Warriors	18	(12)
2022–2023	Kossa	15	(3)
2023	Laugu United	16	(8)

International career^{‡}
2003	Solomon Islands U17	4	(4)
2005	Solomon Islands U20	5	(4)
2008	Solomon Islands U23	5	(8)
2007–	Solomon Islands	52	(29)
Medal record
Men's football
Representing Solomon Islands
Pacific Games
Silver medal – second place	2011 New Caledonia
Pacific Mini Games
Bronze medal – third place	2017 Vanuatu
- * Club domestic league appearances and goals as of 20 November 2023 ‡ National team caps and goals as of 18 July 2019

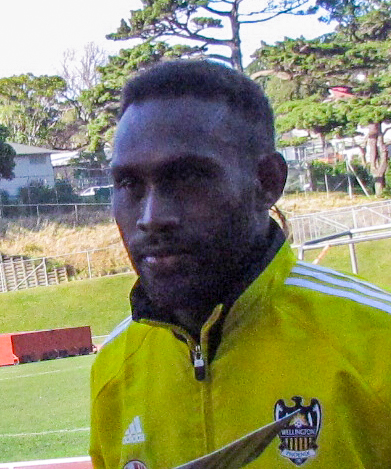

Benjamin Totori (born 20 February 1986) is a Solomon Islands footballer who plays as a striker for Kossa. He has played in the United States and New Zealand.

== Club career ==
A small but speedy striker, Totori made his name at NZFC side YoungHeart Manawatu before moving to Richmond Athletic and then onto Waitakere United in 2007. In 2008, he moved abroad signing with the Portland Timbers in the United States after impressing New Zealand-born coach Gavin Wilkinson.

Totori returned to Waitakere United after injury cut short his career in the USA. He joined Koloale FC Honiara in October 2010 after another successful spell in New Zealand. He immediately ended up top goalscorer in the Telekom S-league, netting 23 goals in only 19 matches.

On 19 June 2012 it was announced Totori had signed a one-year deal with Hyundai A-League club Wellington Phoenix.

On 14 June 2013, Totori and Wellington Phoenix mutually decided to terminate his contract, allowing him to join the Oakleigh Cannons for the remainder of the 2013 season.

From 2014 until 2017 he played in his homeland for Western United. He played in New Zealand for Three Kings United in the NRFL Premier, for Lautoka from Fiji Premier League, Solomon Warriors, Ba and in July 2020 for Isabel United.

From 2021 until 2023 he played for Solomon Warriors F.C., Kossa F.C.then Laugu United.

== Career statistics ==
=== Club ===
Club	Season	League			Cup		Continental		Other		Total	
Club	Season	Division	Apps	Goals	Apps	Goals	Apps	Goals	Apps	Goals	Apps	Goals
Uncles	2002–03	FA Premier League	19	21	0	0	0	0	0	0	19	21
Wantoks	2004	Solomon S-League	1	2	1	1	0	0	0	0	2	3
Young Hearts Manawatu	2005–06	NZFC	11	8	0	0	5	7	0	0	16	15
Young Hearts Manawatu	2006–07	NZFC	21	24	0	0	0	0	0	0	21	24
Young Hearts Manawatu	Total		32	32	0	0	5	7	0	0	37	39
Richmond Athletic	2007	Mainland Premier League	4	4	0	0	0	0	0	0	4	4
Waitakere United	2007–08	Premiership	19	10	0	0	6	2	0	0	25	12
Waitakere United	2008–09	Premiership	12	7	0	0	4	1	1	0	17	8
Waitakere United	2009–10	Premiership	14	6	0	0	7	4	0	0	21	10
Waitakere United	2013–14	Premiership	0	0	0	0	3	1	0	0	3	1
Waitakere United	Total		45	23	0	0	20	8	1	0	66	31
Portland Timbers	2008	USL-1	3	0	0	0	0	0	0	0	3	0
Koloale	2010–11	Solomon S-League	19	23	0	0	6	3	0	0	25	26
Koloale	2011–12	Solomon S-League	0	0	0	0	6	3	0	0	6	3
Koloale	Total		19	23	0	0	12	6	0	0	31	29
Wellington Phoenix	2012–13	A-League	15	0	0	0	0	0	0	0	15	0
Western United	2013–14	Solomon S-League	10	3	0	0	0	0	0	0	10	3
Western United	2014–15	Solomon S-League	0	0	0	0	3	0	0	0	3	0
Western United	2016–17	Solomon S-League	0	0	0	0	3	1	0	0	3	1
Western United	Total		10	3	0	0	6	1	0	0	16	4
Three Kings United	2017	Mainland Premier League	3	0	0	0	0	0	0	0	3	0
Lautoka	2018	Fiji Premier League	13	7	0	0	8	3	0	0	21	10
Lautoka	2019	Fiji Premier League	10	4	11	8	3	2	0	0	24	12
Lautoka	Total		23	11	11	8	11	5	0	0	45	22
Solomon Warriors	2019–20	Telekom S-League	7	5	0	0	0	0	0	0	7	5
Solomon Warriors	2021	Telekom S-League	18	12	0	0	0	0	0	0	18	12
Solomon Warriors	Total		25	17	0	0	0	0	0	0	25	17
Ba	2020	Fiji Premier League	0	0	0	0	3	1	0	0	3	1
Isabel United	2020–21	Telekom S-League	12	6	0	0	0	0	0	0	12	6
Kossa	2022–23	Telekom S-League	15	3	0	0	0	0	0	0	15	3
Laugu United	2023–24	Telekom S-League	16	8	0	0	0	0	0	0	16	8
Laugu United	Total		43	17	0	0	3	1	0	0	46	18
Total career			242	153	12	9	57	28	1	0	312	190

=== International ===
National team	Years	Apps	Goals
Solomon Islands	2007	5	4
Solomon Islands	2011	8	7
Solomon Islands	2012	8	4
Solomon Islands	2013	2	0
Solomon Islands	2016	8	1
Solomon Islands	2017	11	5
Solomon Islands	2018	2	1
Solomon Islands	2019	8	7
Total		52	29

== International career ==
He made his debut for the Solomon Islands in an August 2007 World Cup qualifying match against American Samoa and has represented his country in several age groups at international level.

At the 2011 Pacific Games, Totori scored a hat trick in the Solomon Islands' opening 7–0 win over Guam.

Totori represented his home side at the 2012 OFC Nations Cup in Honiara, Solomon Islands. In a game against Papua New Guinea Totori scored the lone goal of the match, and then in the final group match against New Zealand Totori scored a goal to tie the match 1–1.

=== International goals ===
Scores and results list Solomon Islands's goal tally first.

No.	Date	Venue	Opponent	Score	Result	Competition
1.	25 August 2007	National Soccer Stadium, Apia, Samoa	American Samoa	1–0	12–1	2007 South Pacific Games
2.	25 August 2007	National Soccer Stadium, Apia, Samoa	American Samoa	2–0	12–1	2007 South Pacific Games
3.	3 September 2007	National Soccer Stadium, Apia, Samoa	Samoa	1–0	3–0	2007 South Pacific Games
4.	3 September 2007	National Soccer Stadium, Apia, Samoa	Samoa	2–0	3–0	2007 South Pacific Games
5.	7 July 2011	Lawson Tama Stadium, Honiara, Solomon Islands	Vanuatu	2–0	2–1	Friendly
6.	27 August 2011	Stade Rivière Salée, Nouméa, New Caledonia	Guam	3–0	7–0	2011 Pacific Games
7.	27 August 2011	Stade Rivière Salée, Nouméa, New Caledonia	Guam	4–0	7–0	2011 Pacific Games
8.	27 August 2011	Stade Rivière Salée, Nouméa, New Caledonia	Guam	7–0	7–0	2011 Pacific Games
9.	30 August 2011	Stade Rivière Salée, Nouméa, New Caledonia	American Samoa	1–0	4–0	2011 Pacific Games
10.	3 September 2011	Stade Rivière Salée, Nouméa, New Caledonia	Tuvalu	1–0	6–1	2011 Pacific Games
11.	3 September 2011	Stade Rivière Salée, Nouméa, New Caledonia	Tuvalu	4–0	6–1	2011 Pacific Games
12.	2 June 2012	Lawson Tama Stadium, Honiara, Solomon Islands	Papua New Guinea	1–0	1–0	2012 OFC Nations Cup
13.	6 June 2012	Lawson Tama Stadium, Honiara, Solomon Islands	New Zealand	1–1	1–1	2012 OFC Nations Cup
14.	10 June 2012	Lawson Tama Stadium, Honiara, Solomon Islands	New Zealand	2–3	3–4	2012 OFC Nations Cup
15.	10 June 2012	Lawson Tama Stadium, Honiara, Solomon Islands	New Zealand	3–3	3–4	2012 OFC Nations Cup
16.	24 March 2016	Lawson Tama Stadium, Honiara, Solomon Islands	Papua New Guinea	1–0	2–0	Friendly
17.	9 June 2017	Lawson Tama Stadium, Honiara, Solomon Islands	Papua New Guinea	2–0	3–2	2018 FIFA World Cup qualification
18.	25 August 2017	Port Vila Municipal Stadium, Port Vila, Vanuatu	Tonga	2–0	8–0	2017 Pacific Mini Games
19.	25 August 2017	Port Vila Municipal Stadium, Port Vila, Vanuatu	Tonga	3–0	8–0	2017 Pacific Mini Games
20.	9 December 2017	Port Vila Municipal Stadium, Port Vila, Vanuatu	Tuvalu	5–0	6–0	2017 Pacific Mini Games
21.	15 December 2017	Port Vila Municipal Stadium, Port Vila, Vanuatu	Vanuatu	1–1	2–3	2017 Pacific Mini Games
22.	29 August 2018	Estádio Campo Desportivo, Taipa, Macau	Macau	4–0	4–1	Friendly
23.	24 March 2019	Taipei Municipal Stadium, Taipei, Chinese Taipei	Chinese Taipei	1–0	1–0	Friendly
24.	8 June 2019	National Stadium, Kallang, Singapore	Singapore	3–2	3–4	Friendly
25.	8 July 2019	National Soccer Stadium, Apia, Samoa	Tuvalu	5–0	13–0	2019 Pacific Games
26.	8 July 2019	National Soccer Stadium, Apia, Samoa	Tuvalu	7–0	13–0	2019 Pacific Games
27.	15 July 2019	National Soccer Stadium, Apia, Samoa	American Samoa	4–0	13–0	2019 Pacific Games
28.	18 July 2019	National Soccer Stadium, Apia, Samoa	Fiji	3–4	4–4	2019 Pacific Games
29.	18 July 2019	National Soccer Stadium, Apia, Samoa	Fiji	4–4	4–4	2019 Pacific Games

== Honours ==
=== Player ===
Wellington Phoenix

- NE Super Series Championship runner-up: 2012

Solomon Islands

- Pacific Games: Silver Medalist, 2011
- Pacific Mini Games: Bronze Medalist, 2017

=== Individual ===
- 2006 Oceania Club Championship Top scorer
- 2008 OFC Men's Olympic Football Tournament Top scorer
