= 2007–08 Solomon Islands National Club Championship =

2007–08 National Club Championship
- Season: 2007–08
- Champions: Koloale F.C.
- Matches played: 34
- Goals scored: 151 (4.44 per match)

The 2007–08 Solomon Islands National Club Championship was the 5th season of the National Club Championship in the Solomon Islands. Koloale FC won the league for the second time. All matches were played at the hillside ground called Lawson Tama Stadium, with an approximate capacity of 20,000.

== Teams ==
- Banika Bulls
- Fasi Roos
- FK Kokohale FC
- Iceland Rovers
- Koloale
- KOSSA
- Lagoon Brothers FC
- Landowners FC
- Makuru
- Marist
- Uncles FC
- Vatu FC

== Pools ==
=== Pool A ===
Pos	Team	Pld	W	D	L	GF	GA	GD	Pts	Qualification
1	Uncles FC (Q)	5	4	0	1	20	6	+14	12	Qualified for the semifinals
2	KOSSA (Q)	5	3	1	1	18	6	+12	10	Qualified for the semifinals
3	Marist	5	3	1	1	13	7	+6	10	
4	FK Kokohale FC	5	2	1	2	11	12	−1	7	
5	Landowners FC	5	1	0	4	4	23	−19	3	
6	Iceland Rovers	5	0	1	4	7	19	−12	1	

(Q) Qualified for the phase indicated

=== Pool B ===
Pos	Team	Pld	W	D	L	GF	GA	GD	Pts	Qualification
1	Makuru (Q)	5	4	1	0	27	4	+23	13	Qualified for the semifinals
2	Koloale FC (Q)	5	3	2	0	16	5	+11	11	Qualified for the semifinals
3	Fasi Roos	5	3	1	1	12	7	+5	10	
4	Banika Bulls	5	2	0	3	7	15	−8	6	
5	Lagoon Brothers FC	5	0	1	4	5	18	−13	1	
6	Vatu FC	5	0	1	4	1	19	−18	1	

(Q) Qualified for the phase indicated

== Knockout stage ==
=== Semi-finals ===
6 June 2008

Uncles FC	1-2	Koloale

Lawson Tama Stadium, Honiara
6 June 2008

Makuru	3-1	KOSSA

Lawson Tama Stadium, Honiara

=== Third place match ===
9 June 2008

Uncles FC	2-1	KOSSA

Lawson Tama Stadium, Honiara

=== Final ===
9 June 2008

Koloale	0-0 (p.5-4)	Makuru

Lawson Tama Stadium, Honiara
