= 2003 Solomon Islands National Club Championship =

2003 National Club Championship
- Season: 2003
- Champions: Koloale F.C.
- Matches played: 16
- Goals scored: 87 (5.44 per match)

The 2003 Solomon Islands National Club Championship was the 1st season of the National Club Championship in the Solomon Islands. Central Realas FC won the inaugural league. All matches were played at the hillside ground called Lawson Tama Stadium, with an approximate capacity of 20,000.

== Teams ==
- Auki Kingz
- Banika Bulls
- Husa FC
- Koloale FC
- Kuara FC
- Mareeba Bulls
- Senga FC
- TNT FC

== Pools ==
=== Pool A ===
Pos	Team	Pld	W	D	L	GF	GA	GD	Pts
1	Auki Kingz	3	3	0	0	6	2	+4	9
2	Senga FC	3	1	1	1	4	5	-1	4
3	Kuara FC	3	1	0	2	6	5	+1	3
4	Husa FC	3	0	1	2	4	8	-4	1

=== Pool B ===
Pos	Team	Pld	W	D	L	GF	GA	GD	Pts
1	Koloale FC	3	3	0	0	20	3	+17	9
2	Banika Bulls	3	1	1	1	10	5	+5	4
3	Mareeba Bulls	3	1	1	1	5	9	-4	4
4	TNT FC	3	0	0	3	2	20	-18	0

== Knockout stage ==
=== Semi-finals ===
27 November 2003

Auki Kingz	4-3	Banika Bulls

Lawson Tama Stadium, Honiara
27 November 2003

Koloale	13-1	Senga FC

Lawson Tama Stadium, Honiara

=== Third place match ===
29 November 2003

Senga FC	3-2	Banika Bulls

Lawson Tama Stadium, Honiara

=== Final ===
29 November 2003

Koloale	4-0	Auki Kingz

Lawson Tama Stadium, Honiara
