= 2009–10 Solomon Islands National Club Championship =

2009–10 National Club Championship
- Season: 2009–10
- Champions: (Solomon Islands) Koloale F.C.
- Matches played: 34
- Goals scored: 117 (3.44 per match)

The 2009–10 Solomon Islands National Club Championship was the 7th season of the National Club Championship in the Solomon Islands. Koloale won the league for the third time and also qualified as the Solomon Islands representative for the 2010–11 OFC Champions League through the 2011 Solomon Islands Champions League Playoff against Solomon Warriors. All matches were played at the hillside ground called Lawson Tama Stadium, with an approximate capacity of 20,000.

== Teams ==
- Gizo United
- Harbour Lights
- Ka'arua
- Koloale
- KOSSA
- Makuru
- Marist
- Naha
- Northern United
- Rendova Devon
- SIPA
- Solomon Warriors
- Soloso
- South Central Gold

== Group stage ==
=== Group A ===
Pos	Team	Pld	W	D	L	GF	GA	GD	Pts	Qualification
1	Kossa FC (Q)	4	4	0	0	14	3	+11	12	Qualified for the Knockout Stage
2	Soloso (Q)	4	2	1	1	9	10	−1	7	Qualified for the Knockout Stage
3	Marist (Q)	4	1	1	2	6	7	−1	4	Qualified for the Knockout Stage
4	SIPA	4	0	2	2	6	10	−4	2	
5	Naha	4	0	2	2	6	11	−5	2	

(Q) Qualified for the phase indicated

=== Group B ===
Pos	Team	Pld	W	D	L	GF	GA	GD	Pts	Qualification
1	Koloale (Q)	4	3	1	0	18	0	+18	10	Qualified for the Knockout Stage
2	Rendova Devon (Q)	4	2	2	0	0	0	0	8	Qualified for the Knockout Stage
3	Northern United (Q)	4	2	0	2	6	5	+1	6	Qualified for the Knockout Stage
4	Harbour Lights	4	1	1	2	3	9	−6	4	
5	Ka'arua	4	0	0	4	2	15	−13	0	

(Q) Qualified for the phase indicated

=== Group C ===
Pos	Team	Pld	W	D	L	GF	GA	GD	Pts	Qualification
1	Makuru (Q)	3	3	0	0	7	1	+6	9	Qualified for the Knockout Stage
2	Solomon Warriors (Q)	3	1	1	1	3	4	−1	4	Qualified for the Knockout Stage
3	Gizo United	3	0	2	1	4	7	−3	2	
4	South Central Gold	3	0	1	2	1	3	−2	1	

(Q) Qualified for the phase indicated

== Knockout stage ==
=== Quarter–finals ===
26 May 2010

Makuru	1–2	Rendova Devon

Lawson Tama Stadium, Honiara
26 May 2010

Koloale	3–1	Marist

Lawson Tama Stadium, Honiara
27 May 2010

Solomon Warriors	3–1	Soloso

Lawson Tama Stadium, Honiara
27 May 2010

KOSSA	2–1	Northern United

Lawson Tama Stadium, Honiara

=== Semi–finals ===
28 May 2011

Solomon Warriors	5–1	Rendova Devon

Lawson Tama Stadium, Honiara
28 May 2011

Koloale	3–0	KOSSA

Lawson Tama Stadium, Honiara

=== Third place match ===
29 May 2011

KOSSA	4–2	Rendova Devon

Lawson Tama Stadium, Honiara

=== Final ===
29 May 2011

Koloale	2–1	Solomon Warriors

Lawson Tama Stadium, Honiara
