= John Orobulu =

Solomon Islands footballer

Personal information
- Date of birth: 29 August 2000 (age 26)
- Place of birth: Honiara, Solomon Islands
- Position: Forward

Team information
- Current team: PNG Hekari
- Number: 10

Senior career*
Years	Team	Apps	(Gls)
2023–2024	Southern United		
2024–2025	Rewa	24	(22)
2025–	PNG Hekari		

International career
2023–	Solomon Islands	9	(8)
Medal record
Representing Solomon Islands
Pacific Games
Silver medal – second place	2023 Solomon Islands
MSG Prime Minister's Cup
Winner	2023 New Caledonia
Third place	2024 Solomon Islands
- * Club domestic league appearances and goals

John Orobulu is a Solomon Islands professional footballer who currently plays for Papua New Guinea Premier Soccer League club PNG Hekari and the Solomon Islands national team.

== Club career ==
Orobulu took part in the 2022 Solomon Cup with Honiara Warriors FC. He went on to become top scorer in the competition. His performance included a four-goal match against Makira-Ulawa which garnered him Man of the Match honours. Later that year, he was a standout player in the IUMI Cup, a competition mostly for youth players which also features players from the Telekom S-League. Orobulu scored at least fifteen goals as the second-best scorer in the competition.

For the 2023 S-League season, Orobulu joined Southern United. In the club's first match of the season, Orobulu scored a hat-trick against defending champions Solomon Warriors. It was the first hat-trick scored by any player in the new season. In his first four league matches, the player scored five goals to take an early lead in the Golden Boot race. To open the second half of the season, Orobulu scored a brace in a 2–1 victory over Marist. The brace increased Orobulu's goal tally to fourteen, five more than second-place Gagame Feni.

Following his golden boot win at the 2023 Pacific Games, Orobulu was expected to join Ba of the Fiji Premier League during the winter 2024 transfer window. Another Fijian club, Nadroga F.C. was also reportedly close to signing the player, before Orobulu ultimately declined the deal. Shortly thereafter it was announced in late January 2024 that he had joined domestic side Henderson Eels for the 2024 season.

In 2024 Orobulu’s moved to Fijian team Rewa FC, despite news reports saying he would stay in the Solomon Islands to complete the season in the Telekom S-League. It was announced in November 2025 that Orobulu had signed for PNG Hekari FC for the OFC Professional League inaugural season.

== International career ==
In July 2023, while top scorer in the S-League, Orobulu was called up to the Solomon Islands national team for the first time for a training camp. The following October, head coach Felipe Vega-Arango named Orobulu as one of three new players in the senior squad that would take part in the 2023 MSG Prime Minister's Cup in New Caledonia as a preparation for the 2023 Pacific Games. Orobulu made his debut in the opening match of the tournament, an eventual 3–1 victory over Papua New Guinea on 8 October.

Orobulu was named to the Solomon's squad for the Pacific Games in November 2023. He went on to be the top scorer in the competition with eight goals. His performances included a goal against Samoa, five against American Samoa, and a brace against New Caledonia in the final. Orobulu's two goals in the championship match were not enough as the Solomon Islands drew 2–2 in regulation before falling on penalties.

== Career statistics ==
=== International ===
As of match played 18 December 2024

Appearances and goals by national team and year
National team	Year	Apps	Goals
Solomon Islands	2023	7	8
Solomon Islands	2024	10	0
Total		17	8

Scores and results list Solomon Islands' goal tally first, score column indicates score after each Orobulu goal.

List of international goals scored by John Orobulu
No.	Date	Venue	Opponent	Score	Result	Competition	Ref.
1	17 December 2023	Lawson Tama Stadium, Honiara, Solomon Islands	Samoa	1–0	1–0	2023 Pacific Games	
2	23 December 2023	Lawson Tama Stadium, Honiara, Solomon Islands	American Samoa	1–0	11–0	2023 Pacific Games	
3	23 December 2023	Lawson Tama Stadium, Honiara, Solomon Islands	American Samoa	7–0	11–0	2023 Pacific Games	
4	23 December 2023	Lawson Tama Stadium, Honiara, Solomon Islands	American Samoa	9–0	11–0	2023 Pacific Games	
5	23 December 2023	Lawson Tama Stadium, Honiara, Solomon Islands	American Samoa	10–0	11–0	2023 Pacific Games	
6	23 December 2023	Lawson Tama Stadium, Honiara, Solomon Islands	American Samoa	11–0	11–0	2023 Pacific Games	
7	2 December 2023	National Stadium, Honiara, Solomon Islands	New Caledonia	1–1	2–2	2023 Pacific Games	
8	2 December 2023	National Stadium, Honiara, Solomon Islands	New Caledonia	2–2	2–2	2023 Pacific Games	

== Honours ==
Solomon Islands

- Pacific Games: Silver Medalist, 2023
- MSG Prime Minister's Cup: 2023; 3rd place, 2024
