= F.C. Guadalcanal =

FC Guadalcanal
- Full name: Football Club Guadalcanal
- Founded: 2010
- Ground: Lawson Tama Stadium; Honiara, Solomon Islands
- Capacity: 22,000
- Coach: (Solomon Islands) Luke Eroi
- League: Telekom S-League
- 2018: 8th

FC Guadalcanal is a Solomon Islands football club based in Honiara, which plays in the Telekom S-League. Until 2015 they played in the Honiara Football League, but as of the 2015 season they will play on the highest level in the Solomon Islands. Besides soccer, the club also has a futsal team.

== Achievements ==
- HFA premier division champions 2015: 1st

== Current squad ==
Squad for the 2017 Solomon Islands S-League

Note: Flags indicate national team as defined under FIFA eligibility rules; some limited exceptions apply. Players may hold more than one non-FIFA nationality.

No.	Pos.	Nation	Player
—	GK	ITA	Fabrizio Pratticò
—	GK	SOL	Allen Samani
—	DF	SOL	Michael Sira
—	DF	SOL	George Stevenson
—	DF	SOL	Martin Salemanu
—	DF	SOL	George Kakai
—	DF	SOL	Isaac Mani
—	DF	SOL	Rickson Uvi
—	DF	SOL	Chris Mola
—	MF	SOL	Henderson Doke
—	MF	SOL	Coleman Makau
—	MF	SOL	Leslie Ramo
—	MF	SOL	James Suakini

No.	Pos.	Nation	Player
—	MF	SOL	Julius Suava
—	FW	SOL	Oscar Sara
—	FW	SOL	Harrison Mala
—	MF	SOL	Alvin Hou
—	MF	SOL	Wilson Sam
—	DF	SOL	Junior Thomas
—	FW	SOL	Graham Alfred
—	MF	SOL	Mostyn Sanga
—	FW	SOL	Tutu Lionel Jared
—	MF	SOL	Lenson Bisili
—	FW	SOL	Steward Nano
—	GK	SOL	Thomas Malata
