= 2021 Solomon Islands S-League =

Telekom S-League
- Season: 2021–22
- Champions: Central Coast FC
- Matches: 132
- Goals: 408 (3.09 per match)
- Top goalscorer: Gagame Feni and Molea Tigi (14 goals each)

The 2021–22 Telekom S-League was the 18th season of the Telekom S-League, the top football league in the Solomon Islands. It ended on 21 November 2021. Many games take place at the 22,000-capacity Lawson Tama Stadium.

The league started on 5 June 2021.

== Teams ==
Twelve teams play the 2021 season, an increase from nine in the 2019–2020 season. Malaita Kingz F.C. last from the previous season did not enter, and was replaced by Waneagu United and Kula FC.

- Central Coast (Honiara)
- Henderson Eels (Honiara)
- Honiara City (Honiara)
- Vfresh Isabel United (Isabel Province)
- Kossa (Honiara)
- Laugu United (Honiara)
- Marist (Honiara)
- Real Kakamora (Makira-Ulawa)
- Solomon Warriors (Honiara)
- Southern United (Honiara)
- Waneagu United
- Kula F.C.

== Champions ==
Team	Location	Stadium	Capacity
Central Coast F.C.	Honiara	Lawson Tama Stadium	22,000

== League table ==
Pos	Team	Pld	W	D	L	GF	GA	GD	Pts	Qualification or relegation
1	Central Coast	22	15	4	3	47	19	+28	49	Qualification to OFC Champions League group stage
2	Solomon Warriors	22	14	5	3	57	19	+38	47	Qualification to OFC Champions League group stage
3	Waneagu United	22	12	8	2	33	10	+23	44	
4	Henderson Eels	22	12	4	6	45	19	+26	40	
5	Real Kakamora	22	10	4	8	41	32	+9	34	
6	Vfresh Isabel United	22	10	4	8	29	31	−2	34	
7	Kossa	22	9	3	10	43	44	−1	30	
8	Laugu United	22	7	5	10	33	31	+2	26	
9	Marist	22	6	8	8	24	35	−11	26	
10	Southern United	22	4	4	14	27	55	−28	16	
11	Honiara City	22	3	6	13	19	43	−24	15	
12	Kula	22	1	3	18	10	70	−60	6	

Source: SIFF, Soccerway

== Top scorers ==
Rank	Player	Club	Goals
1	(Solomon Islands) Gagame Feni	Kossa	14
1	(Solomon Islands) Molea Tigi	Solomon Warriors	14
3	(Solomon Islands) Jaygray Sipakana	Real Kakamora	13
4	(Solomon Islands) Raphael Lea'i	Henderson Eels	12
4	(Solomon Islands) Dennis Ifunaoa	Solomon Warriors	12
4	(Solomon Islands) Benjamin Totori	Solomon Warriors	12
7	(Solomon Islands) Clifford Fatafi	Isabel United	9
7	(Solomon Islands) Joe Luwi	Kossa	9
7	(Solomon Islands) Charles Mani	Central Coast	9
7	(Solomon Islands) Adrian Mara	Henderson Eels	9
7	(Solomon Islands) Tuti Tanito	Henderson Eels	9

== Hat-tricks ==
Player	For	Against	Score	Date
(Solomon Islands) Raphael Lea'i^{4}	Henderson Eels	Kula	8–0	6 June 2021
(Solomon Islands) Raphael Lea'i^{5}	Henderson Eels	Southern United	1–8	12 June 2021
(Solomon Islands) Mathias Iani	Laugu United	Southern United	6–0	20 June 2021
(Solomon Islands) Mike Foai	Southern United	Honiara City	5–2	26 June 2021
(Solomon Islands) Augustine Halumwane	Southern United	Kula	2–3	4 July 2021
(Solomon Islands) Gagame Feni	Kossa	Kula	4–0	8 August 2021
(Solomon Islands) Jaygray Sipakana^{4}	Real Kakamora	Southern United	2–4	12 September 2021
(Solomon Islands) Molea Tigi	Solomon Warriors	Kula	0–7	31 October 2021
