= Raphael Lea'i =

Solomon Islands footballer

Personal information
- Full name: Raphael Ohanua Lea'i Jr.
- Date of birth: 9 September 2003 (age 23)
- Place of birth: Honiara, Solomon Islands
- Height: 1.76 m (5 ft 9 in)
- Positions: Striker; winger

Team information
- Current team: Central Coast
- Number: 7

Youth career
- 2015: Kossa
- 2016–2018: Marist

Senior career*
Years	Team	Apps	(Gls)
2018	Marist	6	(4)
2019–2023	Henderson Eels	44	(91)
2023–2024	Velež Mostar	12	(2)
2024	Adelaide City	9	(2)
2025	Wollongong Wolves	28	(4)
2026	Solomon Kings	9	(0)
2026–	Central Coast	11	(27)

International career^{‡}
2018–2019	Solomon Islands U17	12	(14)
2022–	Solomon Islands	36	(17)
Medal record
Representing Solomon Islands
Pacific Games
Silver medal – second place	2023 Solomon Islands
MSG Prime Minister's Cup
Winner	2023 New Caledonia
Third place	2024 Solomon Islands
- * Club domestic league appearances and goals ‡ National team caps and goals as of 30 September 2026

Raphael Ohanua Lea'i Jr. (born 9 September 2003) is a Solomon Islands professional footballer who plays as a striker for Central Coast and the Solomon Islands national team. He is the first Solomon Islands player to have played professional football in Europe.

== Early life ==
Lea'i was born on 9 September 2003 in Honiara. Taking up futsal at the age of 12, he played for local side Kossa before moving to Marist.

== Club career ==
=== Marist ===
Following promising performances at international level, Lea'i was noticed by foreign clubs, including Argentine Primera División club Deportivo Godoy Cruz and Australian A-League side Brisbane Roar. Both clubs offered him a trial, however due to FIFA regulations on youth footballers, he was unable to sign an overseas professional contract before the age of 18.

By the end of 2018, Lea'i had made his senior debut for Marist scoring four goals across six matches in the 2018 Solomon Islands S-League. For 2019, Lea'i was offered a scholarship to New Zealand high school Scots College, affiliated with A-League club Wellington Phoenix; the school had previously seen foreign scholarship awardees move to professional clubs, including Eugenio Pizzuto and Calvin Harris. Though unable to appear in competitive matches for Phoenix youth sides due to FIFA laws preventing the foreign transfer of players under 18, Lea'i ended the season as the local Wellington high school league's top scorer, having scored 15 of Scots' 41 goals for the season.

=== Henderson Eels ===
Following his time in New Zealand, Lea'i signed with Henderson Eels for the end of the 2019–20 S-League season. In his first season he scored 24 goals in seven matches, including a haul of 11 goals in a single match against Real Kakamora. At the end of the 2019–20 S-League season, Lea'i was invited to a weeklong trial with A-League side Melbourne Victory. During the beginning of the 2021–22 Solomon Islands S-League season, he was offered a trial with Turkish Süper Lig side Alanyaspor, however Visa issues caused this to be delayed.

=== Velež Mostar ===
In January 2023, it was announced that Lea'i was returning to Europe to trial with Velež Mostar of the Bosnian Premier League. It was originally reported that the stint in Bosnia and Herzegovina was only part of the player's preparation for another trial with Alanyaspor. However, it was later clarified that Lea'i was traveling to Turkey with Mostar as part of his trial with the club. After a successful trial match against Neretvanac Opuzen of Croatia's 3. NL, Lea'i signed a contract with the club until the end of the 2023–24 season. In the process, Lea'i become the first Solomon Islander to sign for a professional club in Europe.

He scored his first goal for the club on 12 May 2023 on his first start in a game against Igman Konjic. In September 2023, Lea'i returned home after bouts of homesickness, staying on the team's books and thus did not appear again with the team at the time of his contract expiration on 30 May 2024.

=== Adelaide City ===
In June 2024, after his contract with Velež Mostar expired, Lea'i signed for Adelaide City in the National Premier Leagues South Australia.

== International career ==
=== Youth ===
By the age of 14, Lea'i had impressed enough to be selected for the 2017 OFC Youth Futsal Tournament. Despite being three years younger than some of his opponents, Lea'i shone through as the tournament's best player and top scorer, scoring 34 goals in six matches. He was pivotal to the success of the undefeated Solomon Islands team, helping them sweep aside the competition to take the title as well as qualifying for the 2018 Youth Olympics in Argentina. At the 2018 Youth Olympics, Lea'i scored seven goals as the Solomon Islands were eliminated in the group stage.

In September 2018, Lea'i was selected for the 2018 OFC U-16 Championship, held in Honiara. Once again, he was crucial to the success of the Solomon Islands team, scoring seven goals in three consecutive 5–0 wins over Papua New Guinea, New Zealand and Vanuatu. Solomon Islands subsequently qualified for the 2019 FIFA U-17 World Cup by defeating Fiji 3–1 in the semi-final. In the final, he missed a penalty just before full-time, with New Zealand eventually prevailing 5–4 in a penalty shootout.

Lea'i was selected to take part in the 2019 U-17 Minsk Tournament in preparation for the 2019 FIFA U-17 World Cup. He scored in all three games; one in a 2–1 win over Moldova, as well as a goal in a 1–1 draw against Belarus and both goals in a 2–2 draw against Kazakhstan.

In the 2019 FIFA U-17 World Cup, Lea'i appeared in all three games - against Italy, Paraguay and Mexico — as the Solomon Islands were eliminated in the group stage.

=== Senior ===
During the 2022 FIFA World Cup qualification, Lea'i scored all three goals in a 3–1 win against Tahiti to cement Solomon Islands' spot top of Group A and qualify to the semi-finals as group winners.

On 8 October 2023, he scored his second international hat-trick against Papua New Guinea winning the match 3–1 in the 2023 MSG Prime Minister's Cup. He was later awarded the player of the tournament award.

On 27 March 2026, Lea’i scored a brace against Bulgaria in the 2026 FIFA Series. He becomes the first Solomon Islands player to score against a European side.

== Career statistics ==
=== Club ===
Club	Season	League			National Cup (Note: Includes Solomon Cup and Bosnia and Herzegovina Football Cup)		Continental (Note: Includes OFC Champions League)		Other		Total	
Club	Season	Division	Apps	Goals	Apps	Goals	Apps	Goals	Apps	Goals	Apps	Goals
Marist	2018	S-League	6	4	—		—		—		6	4
Henderson Eels	2019–20	S-League	7	24	—		3	2	—		10	26
Henderson Eels	2020–21	S-League	20	33	—		—		—		20	33
Henderson Eels	2021–22	S-League	7	12	—		—		—		7	12
Henderson Eels	2022–23	S-League	10	22	—		—		—		10	22
Henderson Eels	Total		50	95	0	0	3	2	0	0	53	97
Velež Mostar	2022–23	Premier League BH	10	1	1	0	—		—		11	1
Velež Mostar	2023–24	Premier League BH	2	1	0	0	—		—		2	1
Velež Mostar	Total		12	2	1	0	0	0	0	0	13	2
Adelaide City	2024	NPL South Australia	9	2	0	0	—		—		9	2
Wollongong Wolves	2025	NPL NSW	28	4	1	1	—		—		29	5
Solomon Kings	2026	OFC Pro League	9	0	—		—		—		9	0
Central Coast	2026	S-League	11	27	—		5	4	—		16	31
Career total			119	130	2	1	8	6	0	0	129	137

=== International ===
As of match played 30 September 2026.

Solomon Islands
Year	Apps	Goals
2022	7	5
2023	8	6
2024	13	1
2025	3	0
2026	6	5
Total	36	17

Scores and results list the Solomon Islands' goal tally first.

List of international goals scored by Raphael Lea'i
No.	Date	Venue	Cap	Opponent	Score	Result	Competition
1	24 March 2022	Al-Arabi Stadium, Doha, Qatar	2	Tahiti	1–0	3–1	2022 FIFA World Cup qualification
2	24 March 2022	Al-Arabi Stadium, Doha, Qatar	2	Tahiti	2–1	3–1	2022 FIFA World Cup qualification
3	24 March 2022	Al-Arabi Stadium, Doha, Qatar	2	Tahiti	3–1	3–1	2022 FIFA World Cup qualification
4	27 March 2022	Al-Arabi Stadium, Doha, Qatar	3	Papua New Guinea	3–1	3–2	2022 FIFA World Cup qualification
5	24 September 2022	Luganville Stadium, Luganville, Vanuatu	6	Fiji	1–0	2–2	2022 MSG Prime Minister's Cup
6	14 June 2023	Sultan Mizan Zainal Abidin Stadium, Terengganu, Malaysia	8	Malaysia	1–0	1–4	Friendly
7	8 October 2023	Stade Numa-Daly Magenta, Nouméa, New Caledonia	10	Papua New Guinea	1–1	3–1	2023 MSG Prime Minister's Cup
8	8 October 2023	Stade Numa-Daly Magenta, Nouméa, New Caledonia	10	Papua New Guinea	2–1	3–1	2023 MSG Prime Minister's Cup
9	8 October 2023	Stade Numa-Daly Magenta, Nouméa, New Caledonia	10	Papua New Guinea	3–1	3–1	2023 MSG Prime Minister's Cup
10	14 October 2023	Stade Numa-Daly Magenta, Nouméa, New Caledonia	12	New Caledonia	1–0	1–0	2023 MSG Prime Minister's Cup
11	28 November 2023	Lawson Tama Stadium, Honiara, Solomon Islands	14	Fiji	1–0	2–0	2023 Pacific Games
12	14 November 2024	PNG Football Stadium, Port Moresby, Papua New Guinea	23	New Caledonia	1–1	2–3	2026 FIFA World Cup qualification
13	27 March 2026	Gelora Bung Karno Stadium, Jakarta, Indonesia	31	Bulgaria	1–2	2–10	2026 FIFA Series
14	27 March 2026	Gelora Bung Karno Stadium, Jakarta, Indonesia	31	Bulgaria	2–8	2–10	2026 FIFA Series
15	21 September 2026	HFC Bank Stadium, Suva, Fiji	34	New Caledonia	1–0	0–2	2026 MSG Prime Minister's Cup
16	24 September 2026	HFC Bank Stadium, Suva, Fiji	35	Vanuatu	2–2	3–3	2026 MSG Prime Minister's Cup
17	30 September 2026	HFC Bank Stadium, Suva, Fiji	36	Papua New Guinea	1–0	1–1	2026 MSG Prime Minister's Cup

== Honours ==
Henderson Eels

- Telekom S-League: 2020–21

Solomon Islands

- Pacific Games: Silver Medalist, 2023
- MSG Prime Minister's Cup: 2023; 3rd place, 2024

Solomon Islands U18 (futsal)

- OFC Youth Futsal Tournament: 2017

Solomon Islands U17

- OFC U-16/U-17 Championship runner-up: 2018
