= 2006–07 Solomon Islands National Club Championship =

2006–07 National Club Championship
- Season: 2006–07
- Champions: KOSSA

The 2006–07 Solomon Islands National Club Championship was the 4th season of the National Club Championship in the Solomon Islands. KOSSA won the league for the first time. All matches were played at the hillside ground called Lawson Tama Stadium, with an approximate capacity of 20,000.

== Teams ==
- Auki Kingz
- Avaiki Chiefs Warriors
- FK Kokohale FC
- Katova FC
- Koloale
- KOSSA
- Marist
- Northern Warriors
- Paratasi

== Knockout stage ==
=== Semi-finals ===
29? May 2007

Koloale	7-1	Northern Warriors

Lawson Tama Stadium, Honiara
29? May 2007

KOSSA	3-1	Makuru FC

Lawson Tama Stadium, Honiara

=== Final ===
30 May 2007

KOSSA	4-3	Koloale

Lawson Tama Stadium, Honiara
