= 2017–18 Solomon Islands S-League =

2017–18 Telekom S-League
- Season: 2017–18
- Champions: Solomon Warriors
- Matches played: 56
- Goals scored: 248 (4.43 per match)
- Top goalscorer: (Papua New Guinea) Tommy Semmy (17 goals)

The 2017–18 Telekom S-League is the 14th season of the Telekom S-League in the Solomon Islands. All matches are played at the hillside ground called Lawson Tama Stadium, with an approximate capacity of 20,000.

== League table ==
Pos	Team	Pld	W	D	L	GF	GA	GD	Pts	Qualification
1	Solomon Warriors (C, Q)	14	12	0	2	46	21	+25	36	Qualification for the 2018 OFC Champions League
2	Marist Fire (Q)	14	10	2	2	32	14	+18	32	Qualification for the 2018 OFC Champions League
3	Kossa	14	7	4	3	38	26	+12	25	
4	Henderson Eels	14	7	3	4	39	21	+18	24	
5	Malaita Kingz	14	4	2	8	29	34	−5	14	
6	Western United	14	4	0	10	28	43	−15	12	
7	FC Guadalcanal	14	4	0	10	18	45	−27	12	
8	Real Kakamora	14	2	1	11	18	44	−26	7	

Source: rsssf.com FIFA
(C) Champions; (Q) Qualified for the phase indicated

== TSL Championship ==
=== Quarter-finals ===
==== First legs ====
[Mar 10]

Solomon Warriors 5-0 Real Kakamora

Marist 2-0 Guadalcanal

[Mar 11]

KOSSA 2-2 Western United

Henderson Eels 0-4 Malaita Kingz

==== Second legs ====
[Mar 17]

Malaita Kingz 2-1 Henderson Eels

Western United 3-3 KOSSA [KOSSA on away goal rule]

[Mar 18]

Guadalcanal 0-5 Marist

Real Kakamora 1-4 Solomon Warriors

=== Semi-finals ===
[Mar 21]

Solomon Warriors 4-2 KOSSA

[Mar 22]

Marist 1-0 Malaita Kingz

=== Third place match ===
[Mar 28]

KOSSA 0-2 Malaita Kingz

=== Grand final ===
[Mar 29]

Solomon Warriors 3-1 Marist
