= 2004 OFC Nations Cup final =

- Event: 2004 OFC Nations Cup
Solomon Islands	Australia
(Solomon Islands)	(Australia)
1	11
- on aggregate

First leg
Solomon Islands	Australia
1	5
- Date: 9 October 2004
- Venue: Lawson Tama Stadium, Honiara
- Referee: Peter O'Leary (New Zealand)
- Attendance: 21,000

Second leg
Australia	Solomon Islands
6	0
- Date: 12 October 2004
- Venue: Sydney Football Stadium, Sydney
- Referee: Leone Rakaroi (Fiji)
- Attendance: 19,208

The 2004 OFC Nations Cup final was the final match of the 2004 OFC Nations Cup between Solomon Islands and Australia. It was a two-legged final held on 9 and 12 October in Honiara and Sydney respectively. Australia won the first leg 5–1 and the second 6–0 to win the competition 11–1 on aggregate. Australia won the right to play in the 2005 FIFA Confederations Cup as the representative from the OFC.

== Match ==
=== First leg ===
9 October 2004

Solomon Islands	1–5	Australia
Suri 60'	Report	Skoko 5', 28'; Milicic 19'; Emerton 43'; Elrich 79'

Lawson Tama Stadium, Honiara
Attendance: 21,000
Referee: Peter O'Leary (New Zealand)

Solomon Islands	Australia

GK	1	Felix Ray Jr.
RB	2	Leslie Leo
CB	3	Mahlon Houkarawa
CB	4	George Suri
LB	5	Nelson Kilifa
RM	6	Alick Maemae
CM	7	Jack Samani
CM	8	Paul Kakai
LM	9	Batram Suri
CF	10	Henry Fa'arodo
CF	11	Commins Menapi
Manager:
(England) Alan Gillett

GK	1	Mark Schwarzer
RB	2	Tony Vidmar	(yellow card) 74'
CB	3	Tony Popovic
CB	4	Simon Colosimo
LB	5	Kevin Muscat
RM	6	Brett Emerton
CM	7	Lucas Neill
CM	8	Josip Skoko
LM	9	Vince Grella	(yellow card) 40'
CF	10	Ahmad Elrich
CF	11	Ante Milicic
Manager:
(Australia) Frank Farina

==== Notes ====
- The Solomon Islands line-up is disputed for this match and may not be entirely correct.

=== Second leg ===
12 October 2004

Australia	6–0	Solomon Islands
Milicic 5'; Kewell 8'; Vidmar 60'; Thompson 79'; Elrich 82'; Emerton 89'	Report

Sydney Football Stadium, Sydney
Attendance: 19,208
Referee: Leone Rakaroi (Fiji)

Australia	Solomon Islands

GK	1	Mark Schwarzer
RB	2	Kevin Muscat
CB	3	Tony Vidmar
CB	4	Simon Colosimo
LB	5	Tony Popovic
RM	6	Brett Emerton
CM	7	Lucas Neill
CM	8	Luke Wilkshire
LM	9	Josip Skoko
CF	10	Harry Kewell
CF	11	Ante Milicic
Manager:
(Australia) Frank Farina

GK	1	Felix Ray Jr.
RB	2	George Suri
CB	3	Gideon Omokirio
CB	4	Mahlon Houkarawa
LB	5	Nelson Kilifa
RM	6	Batram Suri
CM	7	George Lui
CM	8	Alick Maemae
LM	9	Henry Fa'arodo
CF	10	Joel Konofilia
CF	11	Commins Menapi
Manager:
(England) Alan Gillett
