= Solomon Islands National Club Championship (2000–2010) =

- Founded: 2000
- Country: Solomon Islands
- Number of clubs: 8
- Most championships: Koloale
- Website: siff.com.sb

The Solomon Islands National Club Championship was the former top-tier association football league in the Solomon Islands that ran from 2000 to 2010. It was run by the Solomon Islands Football Federation. The league was replaced by the Telekom S-League which started in the 2010/11 season and is the current top division league in the Solomon Islands.

The winners of the National Club Championship and the league club both played a two legged play-off for a place in the OFC Champions League. This format is used for the current-running league. Koloale FC won it five times, the most out of its 10 year running.

== Winners ==
- 2000 - Laugu United
- 2001 - Koloale
- 2002 - Koloale
- 2003 - Koloale
- 2004 - Central Realas
- 2005/06 - Marist
- 2006/07 - Kossa
- 2007/08 - Koloale
- 2008/09 - Marist
- 2009/10 - Koloale
