= Felipe Vega-Arango =

Spanish football coach

Personal information
- Full name: Felipe Vega-Arango Alonso
- Place of birth: Gijón, Spain

Managerial career
- Years: Team
- 2017–2018: Solomon Islands
- 2021–2024: Solomon Islands
- 2024–2025: Papua New Guinea
Medal record
Men's football
Representing Solomon Islands (as manager)
Pacific Games
Silver medal – second place	2023 Solomon Islands
Pacific Mini Games
Bronze medal – third place	2017 Vanuatu
MSG Prime Minister's Cup
Winner	2023 New Caledonia

Felipe Vega-Arango Alonso is a Spanish football coach who first managed the Solomon Islands national football team in 2017 and was re-appointed as coach in June 2021.

== Solomon Islands ==
Assuming the post of technical director for the Solomon Islands Football Federation in March 2017 after sending his CV to various football associations around the world, Vega-Arango coevally held the position of coach for the country's national selection also, winning his first game in charge with a 3–2 victory over Papua New Guinea in the group stage of the 2018 FIFA World Cup qualifying phases. This was followed by another 2–1 triumph over the same opposition.

Before their Oceania Football Confederation decider match versus New Zealand for entry into the 2018 FIFA World Cup, he stated that his charges were ready for the round, only to lose to the All Whites 6–1. Despite saying that the chances of a win by a five-goal margin in the next leg were low, Vega-Arango maintained that his ambition was to win the second round. In the end, he led them to a 2–2 draw.

Arango was re-appointed as Head Coach of the Solomon Islands national football team in June 2021.

== Personal life ==
Vega-Arango is the son of Manuel Vega-Arango, the former president of Spanish team Sporting de Gijón.

== Honours ==
=== Manager ===
Solomon Islands

- Pacific Games: Silver Medalist, 2023
- Pacific Mini Games: Bronze Medalist, 2017
- MSG Prime Minister's Cup: 2023
