= Honiara City FC =

Solomon Islands football club

- Ground: Lawson Tama Stadium
- Capacity: 20,000
- Manager: Jerry Allen
- League: Solomon Islands S-League
- 2025: 4th

Honiaria City FC is an Solomon Islands association football club, based in Honiara currently playing in Solomon Islands S-League.

== History ==
Honiara City FC competed in the Solomon Islands S-League for the first time for the 2020 season with former Solomon Islands international Jerry Allen as head coach. The club signed experienced players including Ali Mekawir, Don Keana, Ian Kalu, and Junior David for its inaugural campaign.
