= Giovanni Lavrendi =

Italian footballer

Personal information
- Full name: Giovanni Lavrendi
- Date of birth: 20 April 1986 (age 40)
- Place of birth: Cinquefrondi, Italy
- Height: 1.71 m (5 ft 7 1/2 in)
- Position: Midfielder

Team information
- Current team: Messina

Youth career
- 2002–2004: Reggina

Senior career*
Years	Team	Apps	(Gls)
2004–2006	Trento	54	(3)
2006–2007	Vigor Lamezia	7	(0)
2007–2008	Mezzocorona	14	(1)
2008–2009	Trento	18	(0)
2009–2013	HinterReggio	104	(4)
2013	Vibonese	6	(0)
2013–2015	HinterReggio	48	(8)
2015–2016	Reggina	34	(2)
2016–2017	Palmese	31	(4)
2017–2018	Messina	32	(1)
2018–2019	Castrovillari	32	(1)
2019–	Messina	14	(0)
- * Club domestic league appearances and goals as of 18:49, 29 March 2020 (UTC)

Giovanni Lavrendi (born April 20, 1986) is an Italian footballer who plays as a midfielder for A.C.R. Messina.

== Career ==
=== Messina ===
On 20 November 2019 it was confirmed, that Lavrendi for the second time had returned to Italian Serie D club A.C.R. Messina on a free transfer. He signed a deal for the rest of the season.
