= 2006 Solomon Islands National Club Championship =

2006 National Club Championship
- Season: 2006
- Champions: Marist FC
- Matches played: 29
- Goals scored: 124 (4.28 per match)

The 2006 Solomon Islands National Club Championship was the 3rd season of the National Club Championship in the Solomon Islands. Marist FC won the league for the first time. All matches were played at the hillside ground called Lawson Tama Stadium, with an approximate capacity of 20,000.

== Teams ==
- Aimela FC
- Central United FC
- Koloale FC
- Kuara FC
- Mafi United
- Marist FC
- Mobile Cools
- Ngaube FC
- New Jersey FC
- Tematangi FC
- Uncles FC

== Pools ==
=== Pool A ===
Pos	Team	Pld	W	D	L	GF	GA	GD	Pts
1	Marist FC	5	5	0	0	14	4	+10	15
2	Uncles FC	5	3	1	1	24	7	+17	10
3	New Jersey FC	5	3	1	1	19	7	+12	10
4	Tematangi FC	5	1	1	3	1	12	-11	4
5	Kuara FC	5	1	0	4	2	15	-13	3
6	Mafi United	5	0	1	4	7	22	-15	1

=== Pool B ===
Pos	Team	Pld	W	D	L	GF	GA	GD	Pts
1	Koloale FC	4	3	1	0	13	7	+6	10
2	Central United FC	4	2	2	0	7	4	+3	8
3	Aimela FC	4	2	0	2	15	9	+6	6
4	Ngaube FC	4	1	1	2	5	5	0	4
5	Mobile Cools	4	0	0	4	4	19	-15	0

== Knockout stage ==
=== Semi-finals ===
26 February 2006

Marist FC	4-0	Central United FC

Lawson Tama Stadium, Honiara
1 March 2006

Koloale	2-1	Uncles FC

Lawson Tama Stadium, Honiara

=== Third place match ===
1 March 2006

Central United FC	2-2 (p.3-0)	Uncles FC

Lawson Tama Stadium, Honiara

=== Final ===
1 March 2006

Marist FC	1-0	Koloale

Lawson Tama Stadium, Honiara
