= Fabrizio Pratticò =

Italian footballer (born 1990)

Personal information
- Full name: Fabrizio Maria Pratticò
- Date of birth: 25 May 1990 (age 36)
- Place of birth: Reggio Calabria, Italy
- Height: 1.86 m (6 ft 1 in)
- Position: Goalkeeper

Team information
- Current team: Gallico Catona

Youth career
- 1996–2002: Centro Reggio Junior
- 2002–2007: Reggina
- 2007: Siena

Senior career*
Years	Team	Apps	(Gls)
2007–2008	Valle del Giovenco		
2008–2009	HinterReggio		
2009	Melitese	3	(0)
2009–2010	HinterReggio	27	(0)
2010–2012	Sorrento		
2013–2014	Gallico Catona		
2014	Syrianska	1	(0)
2015	Western United		
2015	BÍ/Bolungarvík		
2016	Gallico Catona		
2016–2017	Western United		
2017–2018	Guadalcanal		
2018–	Gallico Catona		
- * Club domestic league appearances and goals

Fabrizio Maria Pratticò (born 25 May 1990) is an Italian professional footballer who plays as a goalkeeper for Italian club Gallico Catona.

== Career ==
Pratticò was a youth player with Reggina 1914 and started his senior career with A.S. Pescina Valle del Giovenco. After that, he played for HinterReggio Calcio, Melitese, and A.S.D. Sorrento but had to go down to the Eccellenza with ASD Gallico Catona because of injury. In 2014, he signed for Syrianska in the Swedish Superettan until December that year after a trial, where he made one league appearance off the bench, started in the domestic cup and scored zero goals. In 2015, he signed for Western United in the Solomon Islands Telekom S-League, where he made three appearances and scored zero goals in the OFC Champions League and won the domestic championship. Despite being offered a contract extension until 2016, after a failed transfer to Hungary, Pratticò instead signed for Vestri in the Icelandic 1. deild karla through goalkeeper Giacomo Ratto, where he made three league appearances and scored zero goals. However, they were relegated at the end of the season and he received offers from Australia, New Zealand, and Fiji. In 2016, he returned to ASD Gallico Catona before re-signing for Western United. However, he failed to make a single appearances in the OFC Champions League that season. In 2017, he signed for Guadalcanal, who also competed in the Solomon Islands Telekom S-League. In 2018, he returned for the third time to ASD Gallico Catona, where he now plays.
