= Malaita Cup =

- Founded: 1994
- Region: Solomon Islands

The Malaita Cup was an association football cup competition held in the Solomon Islands during the 1990s. It was a knock-out tournament held for football clubs and was run and overseen by the Solomon Islands Football Federation.

The 1994 winners was West Kwara'ae FC. The following year, East Fataleka lifted the cup as champions.
