= Mohammed Rajani =

Tongan footballer (born 1999)

Mohammad Rajani
Personal information
- Full name: Mohammed Rajani
- Date of birth: 16 April 1999 (age 27)
- Place of birth: Sydney, Australia
- Height: 1.78 m (5 ft 10 in)
- Position: Winger

Youth career
- 2016: APIA Leichhardt Tigers

Senior career*
Years	Team	Apps	(Gls)
2018–2020	Rockdale Ilinden FC		
2020–2021	St George FC		
2023	Rockdale Ilinden		

International career
2018	Tonga U20	5	(2)
2019	Tonga U23	3	(0)
2023–	Tonga	4	(1)
- * Club domestic league appearances and goals as of 27 January 2024

Mohammed Rajani (born 16 April 1999) is a footballer who plays as a winger. Born in Australia, he represents Tonga at international level.

== Early life and career ==
Rajani was born in Sydney, Australia to a Tongan mother, and a Pakistani father making him eligible for Australia, Pakistan, and Tonga. Whilst playing youth football for National Premier Leagues NSW club APIA Leichhardt Tigers, Rajani's eligibility for Tonga was first discovered when his coach at the time travelled to Tonga to assist former Tongan internationals Kilifi Uele and Lui Muavesi with some youth coaching programs.

Rajani spent time in England trialling for several clubs including Accrington Stanley, and has also played at National Premier Leagues NSW for Rockdale Ilinden FC.

== National team ==
With the Tonga Football Association keeping tabs on Rajani and other footballers with Tongan nationality spread throughout Australasia and the South Pacific, he was called into the Tonga U20s set up for the 2018 OFC U-19 Championship in Tahiti, where he scored two goals on debut in the qualifying round against Cook Islands U20s

Rajini participated in the 2019 Olympic Qualifying tournament, however finished last in their group, and failed to qualify.

Rajini would go on to make his full national team debut for Tonga during the 2023 Pacific Games, making his debut in a 7–0 loss to New Caledonia. Despite a disappointing performance by Tonga, Rajini would go on to net his first senior international goal for his country against American Samoa in the 11th place playoff as Tonga ran out 6-2 winners.

=== International goals ===
Scores and results list Tonga's goal tally first.

#	Date	Venue	Opponent	Score	Result	Competition
1.	30 November 2003	SIFF Academy Field, Honiara, Solomon Islands	American Samoa	6–2	6–2	2023 Pacific Games
