= Football at the 2023 Pacific Games – Men's tournament =

2023 Pacific Games men's football tournament
Tournament details
- Host country: Solomon Islands
- City: Honiara
- Dates: 17 November–2 December
- Teams: 12 (from 2 confederations)
- Venues: 3 (in 1 host city)

Final positions
- Champions: New Caledonia (8th title)
- Runners-up: Solomon Islands
- Third place: Fiji
- Fourth place: Vanuatu

Tournament statistics
- Matches played: 21
- Goals scored: 102 (4.86 per match)
- Top scorer(s): (Solomon Islands) John Orobulu (8 goals)

Football was contested as part of the programme for the 2023 Pacific Games which was hosted in Honiara, Solomon Islands from 19 November to 2 December 2023. It was the 16th edition of the men's football tournament at the multi-sport event organised by the Pacific Games Council.

The football tournament began with the first matches of the group stage on 17 November 2023 and ended with the gold medal match on 2 December 2023. In a repeat of the 2011 final, New Caledonia and hosts the Solomon Islands contested the final. The match finished 2–2 before New Caledonia defeated the Solomon Islands 7–6 on penalties to win the gold medal for the eighth time. In the bronze medal match, Fiji defeated Vanuatu 4–2.

== Background ==
Football had been part of the Pacific Games programme following the debut of the men's competition at the inaugural 1963 South Pacific Games in Fiji. However, football was not included in the 1999 South Pacific Games programme due to player registration differences between the South Pacific Games system and new Oceania Football Confederation (OFC) and Fédération Internationale de Football Association (FIFA) regulations.

New Caledonia held the record for gold medals having won the football tournament seven times. New Zealand U-23 were the defending champions after defeating New Caledonia 2–1 in the gold medal match at the 2019 Pacific Games in Samoa.

== Format ==
A total of 12 teams took part in the competition. They were drawn into four single round robin groups of three teams. The group winners would contest the semi-finals which would decide the teams contesting the gold and bronze medal matches. Consolation tournaments were held for the teams finishing second (places fifth to eighth) and third (places ninth to 12th) in the group stage.

Originally, Kiribati were due to compete but the team withdrew two weeks before the competition.

=== Participants ===
- American Samoa
- Cook Islands
- Fiji
- ~~Kiribati~~
- New Caledonia
- Northern Mariana Islands
- Papua New Guinea
- Samoa
- Solomon Islands
- Tahiti
- Tonga
- Tuvalu
- Vanuatu

=== Venues ===
The football tournament was held at three venues in Honiara including the National Stadium, Lawson Tama Stadium and SIFF Academy Field.

| Stadium | Capacity |
|---|---|
| National Stadium | 10,000 |
| Lawson Tama Stadium | 20,000 |
| SIFF Academy Field | 500 |
Football at the 2023 Pacific Games – Men's tournament is located in Solomon Islands

== Group stage ==
=== Group A ===
New Caledonia advanced to the semi-finals while Tonga progressed to the fifth-place placement matches and the Cook Islands advanced to the ninth-place placement matches.

==== Table ====
| Pos | Team | Pld | W | D | L | GF | GA | GD | Pts | Qualification |
|---|---|---|---|---|---|---|---|---|---|---|
| 1 | New Caledonia | 2 | 2 | 0 | 0 | 15 | 0 | +15 | 6 | Semi-finals |
| 2 | Cook Islands | 2 | 1 | 0 | 1 | 2 | 9 | −7 | 3 | Fifth–eighth placement |
| 3 | Tonga | 2 | 0 | 0 | 2 | 1 | 9 | −8 | 0 | Ninth–12th placement |

==== Matches ====
18 November 2023
16:00

| New Caledonia | 7–0 | Tonga |
|---|---|---|
| Waya 2', 56', 62'; Vakié 5'; Zeoula 16' (pen.); Wélépane 24'; Katrawa 26' |

SIFF Academy Field, Honiara
Referee: Norbert Hauata (Tahiti)

21 November 2023
16:00

| Tonga | 1–2 | Cook Islands |
|---|---|---|
| Kendler 71' | | Tiputoa 67'; Rimene-Albrett 90+8' |

SIFF Academy Field, Honiara
Referee: David Yareboinen (Papua New Guinea)

24 November 2023
16:00

| Cook Islands | 0–8 | New Caledonia |
|---|---|---|
| | | Zeoula 7', 13'; Xowi 64'; Waya 75', 78', 81'; Katrawa 82', 90+5' |

SIFF Academy Field, Honiara
Referee: Kavitesh Behari (Fiji)

=== Group B ===
Vanuatu advanced to the semi-finals while Papua New Guinea progressed to the fifth-place placement matches and Tuvalu advanced to the ninth-place placement matches.

==== Table ====
| Pos | Team | Pld | W | D | L | GF | GA | GD | Pts | Qualification |
|---|---|---|---|---|---|---|---|---|---|---|
| 1 | Vanuatu | 2 | 1 | 1 | 0 | 7 | 1 | +6 | 4 | Semi-finals |
| 2 | Papua New Guinea | 2 | 1 | 1 | 0 | 4 | 1 | +3 | 4 | Fifth–eighth placement |
| 3 | Tuvalu | 2 | 0 | 0 | 2 | 0 | 9 | −9 | 0 | Ninth–12th placement |

==== Matches ====
17 November 2023
12:00

| Papua New Guinea | 3–0 (w/o) | Tuvalu |

Lawson Tama Stadium, Honiara

20 November 2023
12:00

| Tuvalu | 0–6 | Vanuatu |
|---|---|---|
| | | T. Kalotang 6', 53'; Tenene 11', 70'; Alefaio 35' (o.g.); Moses 71' |

Lawson Tama Stadium, Honiara
Referee: Shama Maemae (Solomon Islands)

23 November 2023
12:00

| Vanuatu | 1–1 | Papua New Guinea |
|---|---|---|
| Soromon 52' | | Kepo 45+7' |

Lawson Tama Stadium, Honiara
Referee: Norbert Hauata (Tahiti)

=== Group C ===
Fiji advanced to the semi-finals while Tahiti progressed to the fifth-place placement matches and the Northern Mariana Islands advanced to the ninth-place placement matches.

==== Table ====
| Pos | Team | Pld | W | D | L | GF | GA | GD | Pts | Qualification |
|---|---|---|---|---|---|---|---|---|---|---|
| 1 | Fiji | 2 | 1 | 1 | 0 | 10 | 0 | +10 | 4 | Semi-finals |
| 2 | Tahiti | 2 | 1 | 1 | 0 | 5 | 0 | +5 | 4 | Fifth–eighth placement |
| 3 | Northern Mariana Islands | 2 | 0 | 0 | 2 | 0 | 15 | −15 | 0 | Ninth–12th placement |

==== Matches ====
18 November 2023
19:00

| Fiji | 10–0 | Northern Mariana Islands |
|---|---|---|
| Begg 1'; Krishna 6', 8', 35'; Nalaubu 18', 43'; Dogalau 56'; Pablo 61' (o.g.); Dunn 66'; Matanisiga 82' |

SIFF Academy Field, Honiara
Referee: Timothy Niu (Solomon Islands)

21 November 2023
19:00

| Fiji | 0–0 | Tahiti |

SIFF Academy Field, Honiara
Referee: Campbell-Kirk Kawana-Waugh (New Zealand)

24 November 2023
19:00

| Northern Mariana Islands | 0–5 | Tahiti |
|---|---|---|
| | | T. Tehau 30', 38' (pen.); Tinirauarii 43'; Degrumelle 69'; Kaspard 71' |

SIFF Academy Field, Honiara
Referee: Timothy Niu (Solomon Islands)

=== Group D ===
The Solomon Islands advanced to the semi-finals while Samoa progressed to the fifth-place placement matches and American Samoa advanced to the ninth-place placement matches.

==== Table ====
| Pos | Team | Pld | W | D | L | GF | GA | GD | Pts | Qualification |
|---|---|---|---|---|---|---|---|---|---|---|
| 1 | Solomon Islands | 2 | 2 | 0 | 0 | 12 | 0 | +12 | 6 | Semi-finals |
| 2 | Samoa | 2 | 1 | 0 | 1 | 10 | 1 | +9 | 3 | Fifth–eighth placement |
| 3 | American Samoa | 2 | 0 | 0 | 2 | 0 | 21 | −21 | 0 | Ninth–12th placement |

==== Matches ====
17 November 2023
15:00

| Solomon Islands | 1–0 | Samoa |
|---|---|---|
| Orobulu 50' |

Lawson Tama Stadium, Honiara
Referee: Campbell-Kirk Kawana-Waugh (New Zealand)

20 November 2023
15:00

| Samoa | 10–0 | American Samoa |
|---|---|---|
| Kwan 10', 49'; Tumua Leo 15', 41', 54', 88', 90+7'; Trainor 24' (pen.); Tumua 61'; Taualai 80' |

Lawson Tama Stadium, Honiara
Referee: Ben Aukwai (Solomon Islands)

23 November 2023
15:00

| American Samoa | 0–11 | Solomon Islands |
|---|---|---|
| | | Orobulu 6', 45+3', 72', 80', 90+3'; Leslie 16'; Feni 25', 41', 66'; Molea 28', 34' |

Lawson Tama Stadium, Honiara
Referee: Calvin Berg (New Zealand)

== Ninth–12th placement ==
=== Semi-finals ===
The Northern Mariana Islands defeated American Samoa and Tuvalu defeated Tonga to advance to the ninth-place play-off.

27 November 2023
10:00

| Northern Mariana Islands | 4–0 | American Samoa |
|---|---|---|
| Yobech 32'; R. Guerrero 46', 70'; Ngewakl 90+4' |

SIFF Academy Field, Honiara
Referee: Torika Delai (Fiji)
27 November 2023
13:00

| Tonga | 0–4 | Tuvalu |
|---|---|---|
| | | Sapele 5'; Pelekata 42'; Vine 81', 84' |

SIFF Academy Field, Honiara
Referee: Shama Maemae (Solomon Islands)

=== 11th-place play-off ===
Tonga defeated American Samoa to finish 11th.

30 November 2023
10:00

| American Samoa | 2–6 | Tonga |
|---|---|---|
| Vaitoelau 37'; Silao 55' | | Polovili 43', 88'; Fifita 47', 81'; Tu'ifangaloka 61'; Rajani 76' (pen.) |

SIFF Academy Field, Honiara, Solomon Islands
Referee: David Yaraboinen (Papua New Guinea)

=== Ninth-place play-off ===
Tuvalu defeated the Northern Mariana Islands to finish ninth.

30 November 2023
13:00

| Northern Mariana Islands | 1–4 | Tuvalu |
|---|---|---|
| Toves 50' | | Vailine 8', 22'; Ualesi 42', 45+3' |

SIFF Academy Field, Honiara, Solomon Islands
Referee: Torika Delai (Fiji)

== Fifth–eighth placement ==
=== Semi-finals ===
Tahiti defeated Samoa to advance to the ninth-place play-off. The Cook Islands withdrew and Papua New Guinea were given a walkover.

27 November 2023
16:00

| Tahiti | 2–1 | Samoa |
|---|---|---|
| Tinirauarii 49'; Lossec 88' | | Tumua 2' |

SIFF Academy Field, Honiara
Referee: David Yaraboinen (Papua New Guinea)
27 November 2023
19:00

| Cook Islands | 0–3 (w/o) | Papua New Guinea |

SIFF Academy Field, Honiara, Solomon Islands

=== Seventh-place play-off ===
Samoa were given a walkover after the Cook Islands withdrew.

30 November 2023
16:00

| Samoa | 3–0 (w/o) | Cook Islands |

SIFF Academy Field, Honiara, Solomon Islands

=== Fifth-place play-off ===
Tahiti defeated Papua New Guinea to finish fifth.

30 November 2023
19:00

| Tahiti | 2–0 | Papua New Guinea |
|---|---|---|
| Tinirauarii 21'; T.Tehau 83' |

SIFF Academy Field, Honiara, Solomon Islands
Referee: Kavitesh Behari (Fiji)

== Semi-finals ==
New Caledonia defeated Vanuatu and the Solomon Islands defeated Fiji to advance to the gold medal match.

28 November 2023
12:00

| New Caledonia | 1–0 | Vanuatu |
|---|---|---|
| Xowi 45+3' |

Lawson Tama Stadium, Honiara, Solomon Islands
Referee: Campbell-Kirk Kawana-Waugh (New Zealand)
28 November 2023
15:00

| Fiji | 0–2 | Solomon Islands |
|---|---|---|
| | | Lea'i 39' (pen.); Lea'alafa 82' |

Lawson Tama Stadium, Honiara, Solomon Islands
Referee: Norbert Hauata (Tahiti)

== Bronze medal match ==
Fiji defeated Vanuatu to win the bronze medal.

1 December 2023
15:00

| Vanuatu | 2–4 | Fiji |
|---|---|---|
| Soromon 28', 45+3' | | Dunn 22', 55'; Begg 73'; Nand 90+2' |

Lawson Tama Stadium, Honiara, Solomon Islands
Referee: Ben Aukwai (Solomon Islands)

== Gold medal match ==
New Caledonia defeated the Solomon Islands on penalties to win the gold medal.

2 December 2023
10:00

| New Caledonia | 2–2 (a.e.t.) | Solomon Islands |
|---|---|---|
| Waya 7'; Wélépane 45+4' | | Orobulu 32', 72' |
Penalties
| Ranchain (penalty missed); Bako (penalty scored); Richard (penalty scored); Waya (penalty scored); Zeoula (penalty scored); Iwa (penalty scored); Waia (penalty scored); Vakié (penalty scored) | 7–6 | (penalty scored) Lea'alafa; (penalty missed) Supa; (penalty scored) Kaua; (penalty scored) Ohasio; (penalty scored) Lea'i; (penalty scored) Peter; (penalty scored) Kofana; (penalty missed) Orobulu |

National Stadium, Honiara, Solomon Islands
Referee: Norbert Hauata (Tahiti)

== Broadcasting ==
All matches were broadcast live on SBS in Australia.

== See also ==
- Football at the 2023 Pacific Games – Women's tournament
- Football at the 2023 Pacific Games
- Football at the Pacific Games
