= Solomon Islands Football Federation =

Sports governing body

OFC
- Short name: SIFF
- Founded: 1979
- Headquarters: Honiara
- FIFA affiliation: 1988
- OFC affiliation: 1988
- President: William Lai
- Website: http://www.siff.com.sb

The Solomon Islands Football Federation (SIFF) was formed in 1979, and previously went by the name Solomon Islanders Football Association (SIFA). In 1989, SIFF attained membership in the world football motherbody, the Federation International of Football Associations (FIFA).

The SIFF is a member of the Oceania Football Confederation. The Solomon Islands national football team made history when they made it to the final Oceania stages of the 2006 World Cup Qualification against Australia. Before the tournament began it was almost presumed this place would go to New Zealand.

== Staff ==
Position	Name
President	(Solomon Islands) William Lai
Vice President	(Solomon Islands) Marlon Houkarawa
Technical Director	(Solomon Islands) Moses Toata
Central Football Association President	(Solomon Islands) Tome Kiki
Women Football	(Solomon Islands) Angeline Vave
Futsal & Beach Soccer	(Solomon Islands) Dickson Kadau

== Divisions ==
- Telekom S-League (Division 1)
- Division 1 Football League (Division 2)
- Former - Solomon Islands National Club Championship (2000-2010)

== Cups ==
- Solomon Cup
- Malaita Cup

== Teams ==
These are the current teams of the 2024 Solomon Islands S-League.

- Solomon Warriors (Honiara)
- Central Coast
- Real Kakamora (Makira-Ulawa)
- Laugu United
- Henderson Eels
- Marist (Honiara)
- Waneagu United
- Honiara City
- SOSA
- KOSSA (Honiara)
- Southern United
- Juniper Tree

These are the current teams of the 2018 HFA Premier Division.

- Henderson Eels
- Solomon Warriors
- Hana
- G. Camp United
- CY Strikers
- Mars United
- Sokomora
- Junior Flamingo
- CDL Lekas
- Northern United
- Marist
- Realas
- Laugu United
- Waneagu
- Kossa
- Makuru
- Walas
- Naha

These are the current teams of the 2018 HFA Division 1

- Sunbeam
- Junior Warriors
- Islands
- Our Breeze
- KGVI Snails
- Juniper
- Maasina
- Saa United
- Koloale
- Rangers
- Three United
- Las United
- Toba Kingz
- DMP
- Kukum Bombers
- Lau Valley
- Solomon Sheet Steel
- Kolei United
