= 2004 Solomon Islands National Club Championship =

2004 National Club Championship
- Season: 2004
- Champions: Central Realas FC

The 2004 Solomon Islands National Club Championship was the 2nd season of the National Club Championship in the Solomon Islands. Central Realas FC won the league for the first time . All matches were played at the hillside ground called Lawson Tama Stadium, with an approximate capacity of 20,000.

== Teams ==
- AH BYC
- Buala FC
- Central Realas FC
- Choiseul Bay
- Goosa
- Kuara FC
- Kutuma
- Makuru FC
- Tulagi Tatala
