= U-17 Minsk Tournament =

- Founded: 2005
- Region: Belarus (UEFA)
- Teams: 8
- Current champions: Belgium U-17
- Most championships: Belarus U-17, Russia U-17, Ukraine U-17, Belgium U-17 (2 titles)

U-17 Minsk Tournament (Russian: Международный юношеский турнир (U-17) на призы АБФФ и Минского городского исполнительного комитета) is annual winter association football friendly competition for junior national under-17 teams that take place in Minsk, Belarus, since 2005. The traditional winter tournament are organize of the Association Belarusian Football Federation and the Minsk City Executive Committee.

The first tournament was held in February 2005 in Minsk, and the winner was the Serbia and Montenegro national under-17 teams.

The tournament participants were divided into two group of four invited under-17 national teams. The winners of group play in the final, the second place teams play match for the 3rd place, the third team in group play match for 5th place, the fourth team in the group play match for 7th place.

== Champions ==
Season	Champion	Score	Runner-up
2005	Serbia and Montenegro U-17		
2006	Belarus U-16	3–1	Poland U-17
2007	Belarus U-17	1–1 aet (5–4 pen)	Moldova U-17
2008	Russia U-17	2–0	Belarus U-16
2009	Ukraine U-17	2–1	Russia U-17
2010	Russia U-17	2–0	Belgium U-17
2011	Belgium U-17	3–1	Serbia U-17
2012	Ukraine U-17	1–0	(Georgia (country)) Georgia U-17
2013	Belgium U-17	0–0 aet (4–2 pen)	Russia U-17
