= HinterReggio Calcio =

Italian football club

HinterReggio
- Full name: HinterReggio Calcio
- Founded: 2006
- Dissolved: 2015
- Ground: Stadio Oreste Granillo, Reggio Calabria, Italy
- Capacity: 27,763
- Chairman: Francesco Pellicanò
- Manager: Antonio Venuto
- League: Serie D/I
- 2012–13: Lega Pro Seconda Divisione/B, 14th
Home colours	Away colours

HinterReggio Calcio was an Italian association football club located in Reggio Calabria, Calabria.

== History ==
=== Foundation ===
The club was founded in 2006 after the renaming of Polisportiva Scillese, of which it kept the colors.

In 2012, they were promoted to Lega Pro Seconda Divisione as Serie D champions. They were relegated back to Serie D after only one season.

In 2015, the club was dissolved.

=== The seasons ===
- 2006–07 Eccellenza Calabria
- 2007–08 Eccellenza Calabria: Promoted to Serie D winning Coppa Italia Dilettanti
- 2008–09 Serie D
- 2009–10 Serie D
- 2010–11 Serie D
- 2011–12 Serie D: Promoted to Lega Pro Seconda Divisione
- 2012–13 Lega Pro Seconda Divisione

== Honours ==
- Coppa Italia Dilettanti
  - Champions: 2007–08
- Coppa Italia Calabria:
  - Winners: 2007–08

== Colors and badge ==
The team's colors are white and blue.

== Current squad ==
- hinterreggio.it

== Former players ==
- (Italy) Fabrizio Pratticò
