= 2014 Melanesian Super Cup =

Tournament details
- Host country: Vanuatu
- City: Port Vila
- Dates: 27 Sep–4 October 2014
- Teams: 3 (from 1 confederation)
- Venue(s): 1 (in 1 host city)
- All statistics correct as of 4 October 2014.

The 2014 Melanesian Super Cup was the inaugural edition of the Melanesian Super Cup. The matches were played at the Port Vila Municipal Stadium in Port Vila, with tournament was played in round-robin format.

== Teams ==
The 3 teams participating in the cup are:

- (Vanuatu) Amicale
- (Solomon Islands) Solomon Warriors
- (Vanuatu) Tafea

== Matches ==
Pos	Team	Pld	W	D	L	GF	GA	GD	Pts	Qualification
1	(Solomon Islands) Solomon Warriors (C)	2	1	1	0	3	2	+1	4	Melanesian Super Cup Champions
2	(Vanuatu) Tafea	2	1	0	1	4	4	0	3	
3	(Vanuatu) Amicale	2	0	1	1	3	4	−1	1	

Source: OFC
(C) Champions

All times UTC+14.

27 September 2014

Tafea (Vanuatu)	3–2	(Vanuatu) Amicale

Port Vila Municipal Stadium, Port Vila
1 October 2014

Tafea (Vanuatu)	1–2	(Solomon Islands) Solomon Warriors

Port Vila Municipal Stadium, Port Vila
4 October 2014
15:00

Amicale (Vanuatu)	1–1	(Solomon Islands) Solomon Warriors

Port Vila Municipal Stadium, Port Vila
