= Melanesian Super Cup =

Association football championship

The Melanesia Cup is an association football championship played between the Melanesian football clubs. The first edition of the cup was held in 2014. The tournament used a round-robin format involving every team playing each other once at the tournaments location.

The 2015 edition was held in Vanuatu.

== Winners ==
- 2014 (3 teams): (Solomon Islands) Solomon Warriors F.C. (1)
- 2015 (4 teams): (Solomon Islands) Solomon Warriors F.C. (2)

Team	Winners	Runners-up	Years won	Years runners-up
(Solomon Islands) Solomon Warriors F.C.	2	0	2014, 2015	—
(Vanuatu) Amicale F.C.	0	1	—	2015
(Vanuatu) Tafea F.C.	0	1	—	2014

=== Wins by country ===
Team	Winners	Runner-up
Solomon Islands	2	0
Vanuatu	0	2

== All-time table (clubs) ==
- From 2014 to 2015.

Pos	Team	Pld	W	D	L	GF	GA	GD	Pts
1	(Solomon Islands) Solomon Warriors FC	5	4	1	0	8	3	+5	13
2	(Vanuatu) Amicale FC	5	1	2	2	6	7	−1	5
3	(Vanuatu) Tafea FC	2	1	0	1	4	4	0	3
4	(Solomon Islands) Western United FC	3	0	2	1	2	3	−1	2
5	(Vanuatu) Erakor Golden Star FC	3	0	1	2	1	4	−3	1

=== All-time table (by countries) ===
- From 2014 to 2015.

Pos	Team	Pld	W	D	L	GF	GA	GD	Pts
1	Solomon Islands	8	4	3	1	10	6	+4	15
2	Vanuatu	10	2	3	5	11	15	−4	9

== See also ==
- Melanesia Cup
