= 2015 Melanesian Super Cup =

Tournament details
- Host country: Vanuatu
- City: Port Vila
- Dates: 3–10 October 2015
- Teams: 4 (from 1 confederation)
- Venue(s): 1 (in 1 host city)
- All statistics correct as of 10 October 2015.

The 2015 Melanesian Super Cup was the 2nd edition of the Melanesian Super Cup. The tournament is held since 2014 and is a sign of the longtime friendship between Vanuatu and the Solomon Islands. The matches were played at the Port Vila Municipal Stadium in Port Vila, with tournament was played in round-robin format. The draw for the fixtures was held on 1 October 2015 at Port Vila, Vanuatu.

== Teams ==
The 4 teams participating in the cup are:

- (Vanuatu) Amicale
- (Vanuatu) Erakor Golden Star
- (Solomon Islands) Solomon Warriors (title holders)
- (Solomon Islands) Western United

== Matches ==
Pos	Team	Pld	W	D	L	GF	GA	GD	Pts	Qualification
1	(Solomon Islands) Solomon Warriors (C)	3	3	0	0	5	1	+4	9	Melanesian Super Cup Champions
2	(Vanuatu) Amicale	3	1	1	1	3	3	0	4	
3	(Solomon Islands) Western United	3	0	2	1	2	3	−1	2	
4	(Vanuatu) Erakor Golden Star	3	0	1	2	1	4	−3	1	

Source: OFC
(C) Champions

All times UTC+14.

3 October 2015
15:00

Amicale (Vanuatu)	1–0	(Vanuatu) Erakor Golden Star
Fenedy Masauvakalo 53'	Report

Port Vila Municipal Stadium, Port Vila
Referee: Mahit Chillia
6 October 2015
15:00

Solomon Warriors (Solomon Islands)	2–0	(Vanuatu) Erakor Golden Star

Port Vila Municipal Stadium, Port Vila
7 October 2015
15:00

Western United (Solomon Islands)	1–1	(Vanuatu) Amicale

Port Vila Municipal Stadium, Port Vila
8 October 2015
15:00

Solomon Warriors (Solomon Islands)	1–0	(Solomon Islands) Western United

Port Vila Municipal Stadium, Port Vila
10 October 2015
13:00

Western United (Solomon Islands)	1–1	(Vanuatu) Erakor Golden Star

Port Vila Municipal Stadium, Port Vila
10 October 2015
15:00

Amicale (Vanuatu)	1–2	(Solomon Islands) Solomon Warriors

Port Vila Municipal Stadium, Port Vila
