= Mahlon Houkarawa =

Solomon Islands footballer

Mahlon Houkarawa (born April 23, 1976) is a Melanesian footballer from the Solomon Islands. Houkarawa currently plays for Koloale FC Honiara and the Solomon Islands national football team. He plays the position of defender.

== Club career ==
Houkarawa played for the East Harbour Strikers before transferring to Koloale FC Honiara in 2002. Playing at the position of defender, Houkarawa has made relatively few appearances for the club.

== International career ==
Houkarawa is the starting defender for the Solomon Islands national team, and has made 21 appearances for the team, and scored 1 goal. He has only been subbed out once.

Appearances and goals by national team and year
National team	Year	Apps	Goals
Solomon Islands	2002	3	0
Solomon Islands	2003	2	0
Solomon Islands	2004	11	1
Solomon Islands	2005	2	0
Solomon Islands	2007	3	0
Total		21	1

Scores and results list Solomon Islands' goal tally first, score column indicates score after each Houkarawa goal.

List of international goals scored by Mahlon Houkarawa
No.	Date	Venue	Opponent	Score	Result	Competition	Ref.
1	4 June 2004	Hindmarsh Stadium, Adelaide, Australia	Fiji	2–1	2–1	2004 OFC Nations Cup	
