= Seoul Yangcheon TNT FC =

Association football club in South Korea

- Full name: TNT Football Club
- Founded: April 2000; 26 years ago
- League: K5 League Seoul
Home colours

Seoul Yangcheon TNT Football Club (Korean: 서울 양천 TNT FC) is a South Korean football club based in Seoul that competes in K5 League Seoul.

== History ==
TNT FC was founded in 2000. Between 2019 and 2022, the club was known as TNT Fitogether FC due to sponsorship reasons.
