= Jack Samani =

Solomon Islands footballer

Jack Samani (born 7 May 1979) is a Solomon Islands footballer.

Samani plays as a winger for his current club PRK Hekari United in the Papua New Guinea National Club Championship after leaving Marist F.C in his native Solomon Islands.

He has also represented the Solomon Islands national football team on numerous occasions, making his debut in 2000 and collecting over 27 caps, scoring 6 goals.

== Club history ==
- PRK Hekari United (2006-)
- Marist F.C (2002–03, 2006)
- Brisbane Wolves FC (2004–2005)
