= Southern United F.C. (Solomon Islands) =

Southern United
- Full name: Southern United Football Club
- Founded: 2020
- Ground: Lawson Tama Stadium; Honiara, Solomon Islands
- Capacity: 20,000
- Chairman: (Solomon Islands) Wayne Tebagai
- Manager: (Solomon Islands) Dion Momaré
- League: Telekom S-League
- 2025: 10th

Southern United F.C. is a Solomon Islands football club of Honiara, which plays in the Telekom S-League since 2020.
