= Solomon Cup =

- Founded: 1991
- Region: Solomon Islands

The Solomon Cup is the top knockout tournament of the Telekom S-League, an association football cup competition in the Solomon Islands. It is played by senior male football clubs from the top division.

There is also the Youth Solomon Cup, held for U-16 and U-19 division clubs.

== Winners ==
- 1991 - Honiara Warriors 4-2 Western Turtles [aet]
- 1992 - Honiara Warriors 4-0 Guadalcanal Hornets
- 1993 - abandoned
- 1994 - Guadalcanal Hornets draw Honiara Warriors [7-6 pen]
- 1995 - no competition
- 1996 - Honiara Warriors 2-0 Malaita Eagles
- 1997 - Malaita Eagles 3-2 Guadalcanal Hornets
- 1998 - Honiara Warriors 1-0 Malaita Eagles
- 1999 - Malaita Eagles 1-0 Temotu Arrows
- 2000-04 - no competition
- 2005 - Honiara Warriors 2-1 Temutu Arrows [aet]
- 2006 - no competition
- 2007 - East Honiara Lions 1-0 Central Honiara Eels [U-23]
- 2008 - no competition
- 2009 - Malaita Eagles 8-0 Guadalcanal Hornets
- 2010-16 - no competition
- 2017 - Malaita Eagles 2-1 Central Shields

== Notes ==
- In 2007 no senior men's tournament was held, only for U-23 teams
