= Makuru F.C. =

Makuru FC
- Full name: Makuru Football Club Honiara
- Founded: 1999
- Ground: Lawson Tama Stadium; Honiara
- Capacity: 20,000
- Manager: Silas Milikada
- League: Honiara FA League
Home colours

Makuru FC is a Solomon Islands football club, playing in the Honiara FA League.

They won the 2004 and 2006/2007 Honiara FA League title. The team is also known as JP Su'uria.

They declined to join the newly formed Telekom S-League due to religious reasons since they did not want to play on Saturdays.

== Titles ==
- Solomon Islands National Club Championship: (0)
- Honiara FA League: (2)

2004, 2007.

- Solomon Islands Cup: (0)

== Performance in OFC competitions ==
- OFC Champions League: 1 appearance

Best: Group stage in 2005
2005: Group stage

== Current squad ==
Note: Flags indicate national team as defined under FIFA eligibility rules; some limited exceptions apply. Players may hold more than one non-FIFA nationality.

No.	Pos.	Nation	Player
1	GK	SOL	Felix Ray Jr.
2	FW	SOL	Leslie Kakai
3	DF	SOL	Adika Maeta
4	DF	SOL	John Iani
5	DF	SOL	Moffat Kilifa
6	DF	SOL	Leslie Leo
7	MF	SOL	Alick Maemae
8		SOL	Ben Kunua
9		SOL	Monystyn Sanga
10	FW	SOL	Batram Suri
12	DF	SOL	Berry Galokale

No.	Pos.	Nation	Player
13	MF	SOL	George Lui
14		SOL	George Afia
15	MF	SOL	Max Ruku
17	FW	SOL	John Anita
18	MF	SOL	Paul Kakai Jnr.
19	MF	SOL	Robert Mafane
20	GK	SOL	Leon Lekezoto
21	DF	SOL	Derrick Taebo
22	DF	SOL	Nelson Sale Kilifa
—	MF	SOL	George Aba
