= Solomon Islands S-League =

Telekom S-League
- Founded: 2000
- Country: Solomon Islands
- Confederation: OFC
- Number of clubs: 12
- Level on pyramid: 1
- Domestic cup: Solomon Cup
- International cup: OFC Champions League
- Current champions: Central Coast (3rd title) (2025)
- Most championships: Solomon Warriors (8 titles)
- Top scorer: Raphael Le'ai (122 goals)
- Broadcaster: FIFA+
- Website: siff.com.sb
- Current: 2025 Solomon Islands S-League

The Solomon Islands S-League, commonly known as just the S-League (and formerly known as the Telekom S-League until 2025 for sponsorship reasons), is a semi professional league and the top division of the Solomon Islands Football Federation. It replaced the Solomon Islands National Club Championship, which lasted from 2000 until 2010.

The league includes Real Kakamora, who served as one of the league's 8 founding members in 2011. After losing all 22 of their matches in the 2023 season, Kakamora established an account on Instagram and gained international attention as the self-proclaimed "worst club in the world," with their posts bringing attention to football in Solomon Islands. Since then, the club has used this attention to rebuild their squad and alter their performance standing in the country.

Solomon Warriors are considered to be the league's most successful club, winning 7 titles since its founding. However, in 2025, the club exited the league and went on hiatus due to financial issues. Central Coast are the defending champions, winning back-to-back titles in 2024 and 2025.

== Format ==
In the current format, all teams compete in a round robin, where the team that ends at the first place are crowned champions. Together with the second-placed team, they qualify for the OFC Champions League. The bottom team is then relegated to the Second Division, while the best performing team from that league is promoted to this league.

== History ==
=== Interprovincial Tournament (1977–85) ===
This tournament had begun the early football in Solomon Islands. It was held by the FA of the Solomon Islands.

=== National Club Championship (2000–10) ===
Starting in 2000, the National Club Championship was formed, taking the top four clubs in the Honiara FA League along with the champions of local leagues from other provinces in the country. Laugu United won the first premiership title, with Koloale winning a record 5 titles during this span. The final championship was the 2009–10 season, before the Telekom S-League replaced the competition next season.

=== The Knockout Championship (2011–12) ===
All teams of the league played a knockout tournament after the 2010–11 and 2011–12 seasons, called the Knockout Championship. The winners of both competitions played a two legged play-off for a place in the OFC Champions League. In the case of the 2011–12 season play-off, Solomon Warriors won both these competitions and automatically qualified. The 8-team competition was abandoned in the 2013–14 season due to the increase of teams from 8 to 9.

=== Telekom S-League (2010–present) ===
In 2011, the competition was renamed to the Telekom S-League. Marist, Koloale, Kossa, Solomon Warriors, Makuru, Hana, Western United and Real Kakamora participated in the initial season of the new league. The first inaugural S-League was won by Koloale.

== Teams ==
- Central Coast (Honiara)
- Henderson Eels (Honiara)
- Honiara City (Honiara)
- Isabel United (Isabel Province)
- Kossa (Honiara)
- Laugu United (Honiara)
- Malaita Kingz (Malaita) until 2021
- Marist (Honiara)
- Real Kakamora (Makira-Ulawa)
- Solomon Warriors (Honiara)
- Southern United (Honiara)

Teams as of the 2020–21 season.

- Kula FC
- Waneagu United

Teams as of the 2021 season.

== Previous winners ==
National Club Championship
Season	Winner
2000	Laugu United
2001	Koloale
2002	Koloale
2003	Koloale
2004	Central Realas
2006	Marist Fire
2006–07	Kossa
2007–08	Koloale
2008–09	Marist Fire
2009–10	Koloale

Telekom S-League
Season	Winner
2010–11	Koloale
2011–12	Solomon Warriors
2013–14	Solomon Warriors
2014–15	Western United
2015–16	Solomon Warriors
2016	Marist Fire
2017–18	Solomon Warriors
2018	Solomon Warriors
2019–20	Solomon Warriors
2020–21	Henderson Eels
2021	Central Coast
2022-23	Solomon Warriors
2023	Solomon Warriors
2024	Central Coast
2025	Central Coast

Knockout Championship
Season	Winner
2011	Solomon Warriors
2012	Solomon Warriors
2017–18	Solomon Warriors

Champions League Play-off
Season	Winner	Runner-up
2011	Koloale	Solomon Warriors
2012	Solomon Warriors	

Regular season (qualify for Champions League)
Season	Winner
2015–16	Solomon Warriors

== Performances ==
=== Performance by club ===
Club	Winners	Winning years
Solomon Warriors	8	2011–12, 2013–14, 2015–16, 2017–18, 2018, 2019–20, 2022–23, 2023
Koloale	6	2001, 2002, 2003, 2007–08, 2009–10, 2010–11
Marist Fire	3	2005–06, 2008–09, 2016
Central Coast	3	2021, 2024, 2025
Western United	2	2014–15
Laugu United	1	2000
Central Realas	1	2004
Kossa	1	2006–07
Henderson Eels	1	2020–21

== Individual statistics ==
=== Top goalscorers ===
Season	Goalscorer	Team	Goals
2010-11	(Solomon Islands) Benjamin Totori	Koloale	23
2013-14	(Solomon Islands) Dennis Ifunaoa	Solomon Warriors	11
2016	(Solomon Islands) James Naka	Western United	27
2017-18	(Papua New Guinea) Tommy Semmy	Malaita Kingz	17
2018	(Vanuatu) Kensi Tangis	Solomon Warriors	23
2019-20	(Solomon Islands) Raphael Lea'i	Henderson Eels	24
2020-21	(Solomon Islands) Joses Nawo	Henderson Eels	35
2021	(Solomon Islands) Gagame Feni	Kossa	14
2021	(Solomon Islands) Molea Tigi	Solomon Warriors	14
2022-23	(Solomon Islands) Gagame Feni	Kossa	34
2023-24	(Solomon Islands) Molea Tigi	Solomon Warriors	30
2024	(Solomon Islands) Dennis Ifunaoa	Solomon Warriors	27
2025	(Solomon Islands) Clifford Fafale	Central Coast	23
2026-27	(Solomon Islands) Raphael Lea'i	Central Coast	27

Most goals in a single season

- 35 goals:
  - Joses Nawo (2020–21).

Most goals in a single game

- 11 goals:
  - Raphael Lea'i (Henderson Eels) 19-0 against Real Kakamora in season 2019-20.

=== Multiple hat-tricks ===
Rank	Country	Player	Hat-tricks
1	(Solomon Islands)	Raphael Lea'i	16
2	(Solomon Islands)	Gagame Feni	9
3	(Solomon Islands)	Joses Nawo	7
4	(Solomon Islands)	Dennis Ifunaoa	5
4	(Solomon Islands)	Bobby Leslie	5
4	(Solomon Islands)	Molea Tigi	5
7	(Solomon Islands)	Harrison Mala	4
7	(Vanuatu)	Kensi Tangis	4
9	(Solomon Islands)	Edward Huniuehu	3
9	(Solomon Islands)	Bently Kelobi	3
11	(Solomon Islands)	Lore Fonaota	2
11	(Solomon Islands)	Junior Fordney	2
11	(Solomon Islands)	Paul Francis	2
11	(Vanuatu)	Tony Kaltack	2
11	(Solomon Islands)	Adrian Mara	2
11	(Solomon Islands)	John Orobulu	2

Most hat-tricks in a single season

- 22 hat-tricks (2022–23)

Most hat-tricks by a player in a single season

- 6 hat-tricks
  - Joses Nawo (2020–21)

== Women's league ==
Solrais Premier League
- Founded: 2002
- Country: Solomon Islands
- Current champions: Henderson Eels (2025)
- Most championships: Henderson Eels and Solomon Warriors (3 titles each)
- Top scorer: Jemina David (186 goals)

=== List of champions ===
Honiara league

- 2004:Naha.
- 2005:Nahant.
- 2006:Rangers.
- 2010:Uncles.

National league

- 2014:Solomon Warriors.
- 2015:Solomon Warriors.
- 2018:Solomon Warriors.
- 2020:Royals.
- 2021:Royals.
- 2022:Koloale.
- 2023:Henderson Eels.
- 2024:Henderson Eels.
- 2025:Henderson Eels.

=== Top goalscorers ===
Season	Player	Team	Goals
2020	(Solomon Islands) Ileen Pegi	Koloale	29
2021	(Solomon Islands) Jemina David	Frigates	39
2022	(Solomon Islands) Jemina David	Frigates	39
2023	(Solomon Islands) Madeline Arukau	Henderson Eels	37
2024	(Solomon Islands) Jemina David	Frigates	34
2025	(Solomon Islands) Madeline Arukau	Henderson Eels	42
2026	(Solomon Islands) Ileen Pegi	Henderson Eels	42

Most time goalscorers

- 3 times.
  - Jemina David (2021, 2022–23 and 2024–24).

Most goals by a player in a single season

- 42 goals each.
  - Madeline Arukau (2025–26).
  - Ileen Pegi (2026-27).

=== All-time goalscorers ===
Rank	Player	Goals	Years
1	Jemina David	186	2020
2	Ileen Pegi	178	2020
3	Madeline Arukau	144	2022
