= Kossa F.C. =

Kossa
- Full name: Kossa Football Club Honiara
- Ground: Lawson Tama Stadium; Honiara
- Capacity: 20,000
- Chairman: Transform Anqorau
- Manager: Fred Osifelo
- League: Telekom S-League
- 2025: 5th

Kossa FC is a Solomon Islands professional football club, playing in the Honiara FA League and in the Solomon Islands National Club Championship.

From 2004 to 2006, the team was known as Fairwest. They clinched the 2007 Solomon Islands National Club Championship title, beating Koloale FC Honiara in the Final. Winning the national league title entitled the club to play in the OFC Champions League 2007–08.

== OFC Champions League 2007—08 ==
Kossa made their debut in the O-League in October 2007, drawing 1–1 at home with Vanuatu team Tafea FC. They then won their second game against Ba F.C.

== Honours ==
- Solomon Islands National Club Championship
  - Champions (1): 2006–07
- Honiara FA League
  - Champions (1): 2008–09

== Performance in OFC competitions ==
- OFC Champions League: 1 appearance

2008: Runners-up
