= Koloale F.C. =

Koloale FC
- Full name: Koloale FC Honiara
- Founded: 1998
- Ground: Lawson Tama Stadium; Honiara
- Capacity: 20,000
- Chairman: Reginald Douglas
- Coach: (Solomon Islands) Henry Koto
- League: Telekom S-League
- 2016: 6th
Home colours

Koloale FC, Honiara, is a Solomon Islands football club, playing in the Telekom S-League. They are based in Honiara. Their ground is Lawson Tama Stadium.

Koloale FC has been one of Solomon Islands most successful clubs in recent years, winning the Honiara FA League in 2001, 2003 and 2008; and the Solomon Islands National Club Championship in 2003 and 2008.

== Titles ==
- Solomon Islands National Club Championship/Telekom S-League
  - Champions (4): 2003–04, 2008–09, 2010–11, 2011–12
- Honiara FA League
  - Champions (3): 2001–02, 2003–04, 2008–09

== Performance in OFC competitions ==
- OFC Champions League: 3 appearances

Best: Finalist in 2009
2009: Finalist
2011: 2° in Group A
2012: 4° in Group B

== Current squad ==
As of 7 September 2014

Note: Flags indicate national team as defined under FIFA eligibility rules; some limited exceptions apply. Players may hold more than one non-FIFA nationality.

No.	Pos.	Nation	Player
1	GK	(Solomon Islands) SOL	Joseph Komu
3	DF	(Solomon Islands) SOL	Leonard Olea
5	DF	(Solomon Islands) SOL	Welshman Houkarawa
9	FW	(Solomon Islands) SOL	Atana Fa’arodo Jnr.
10	FW	(Solomon Islands) SOL	Joe Luwi (Captain)
11	FW	(Solomon Islands) SOL	Michael Taeman
12	MF	(South Africa) RSA	Thabiso Elliot Tleane
13		(Solomon Islands) SOL	Junior Zimri

No.	Pos.	Nation	Player
15	MF	(Solomon Islands) SOL	Lency Saeni
17	MF	(Solomon Islands) SOL	Oliver Jamieh
19	FW	(Solomon Islands) SOL	Albert Samani
21	DF	(Solomon Islands) SOL	Jack Wasi
22	GK	(Solomon Islands) SOL	Jessy Mae
23	MF	(Solomon Islands) SOL	Mostyn Mau
24	DF	(Solomon Islands) SOL	Steven Aretana
25	DF	(Solomon Islands) SOL	Francis Lafai
