= Lawson Tama Stadium =

Multi-purpose stadium in Solomon Islands

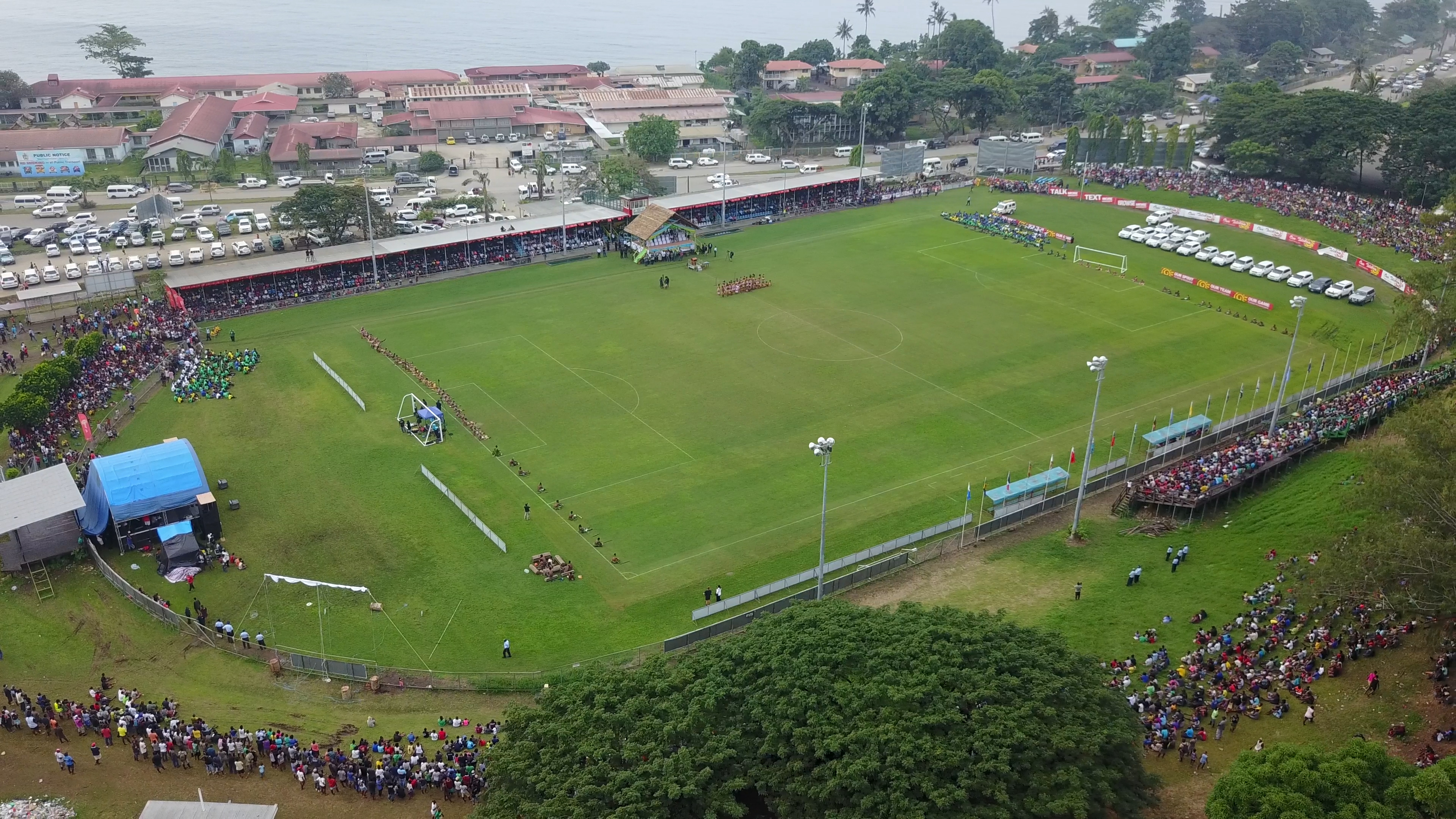
- Interactive map of Lawson Tama Stadium
- Former names: Town Sports Ground
- Location: Honiara, Solomon Islands
- Coordinates: 9°26′12″S 159°58′17″E
- Capacity: 20,000

Construction
- Opened: 1964

Tenants
- Solomon Islands national football team Real Kakamora F.C. Kossa FC; Marist FC; Solomon Warriors F.C. Malaita Kingz FC

Lawson Tama Stadium is a multi-purpose stadium in Honiara, Solomon Islands. It is used mostly for football matches. The stadium is unique as the stand is built into the hillside so there is no official capacity but no more than 20,000 would fit the surrounding grassland. The stadium hosted the 2012 OFC Nations Cup and inaugural Mini South Pacific Games in July 1981.

== History ==
Following the establishment of the British Solomon Islands Amateur Sports Association following a meeting in August 1961, the government allocated an area near the town's hospital. The ground was initially known as the Town Sports Ground, and preparation work was completed in early 1964. In 1965 plans were made to build a pavilion and other facilities.

As Honiara expanded, the ground became more central. It was suggested that the ground should be renamed, with the "Hospital Ground" being one suggestion. Eventually it was named after Eric Lawson, who was heavily involved in helping to establish it.
