= 2011 OFC U-20 Championship squads =

The 2011 OFC U-20 Championship, is the 18th OFC Under 20 Qualifying Tournament, the biennial football championship of Oceania (OFC) in which the winner qualifies for the FIFA U-20 World Cup. It will be held in New Zealand in April 2011.

Each Participating Association may nominate up to 20 players, two of whom must be goalkeepers for the Championship.

No player may be replaced in the Official Team List during the Championship, except if it involves a goalkeeper who is injured during the Championship and can no longer take part in the remainder of the matches, and only after acceptance and confirmation by a designated Medical Officer that the injury is sufficiently serious to prevent the goalkeeper from taking part in the Championship.

== Group A ==
=== American Samoa ===
Coach: (American Samoa) Rupeni Luvu

| No. | Pos. | Player | Date of birth (age) | Caps | Club |
|---|---|---|---|---|---|
| 1 | GK | Rhine Samuelu | 19 February 1991 (aged 20) | | |
| 2 | DF | Daru Taumua | 21 November 1991 (aged 19) | | |
| 3 | DF | Shalom Luani | 5 August 1994 (aged 16) | | |
| 4 | DF | Suani Save | 20 May 1991 (aged 19) | | |
| 6 | FW | Taalenuu Faavi | | | |
| 7 | | Ryan Samuelu | | | |
| 8 | | Ismael Herrera | | | |
| 9 | FW | Ryan Petaia | | | |
| 10 | FW | Chris Seui | | | |
| 11 | | Justine Tome | | | |
| 12 | | Sam Patea | | | |
| 13 | FW | Roy Luani | | | |
| 14 | | Moe Kuresa | | | |
| 15 | | Vaiali'i Alatini | | | |
| 16 | DF | Lafaele Colins | | | |
| 17 | DF | Matthew Mariota | | | |
| 18 | DF | Lolani Faaloua | | | |
| 19 | | Danny Mulitalo | | | |
| 23 | GK | Benjamin Fualaga | | | |

=== Fiji ===
Coach: (Fiji) Claudio Canosa

| No. | Pos. | Player | Date of birth (age) | Caps | Club |
|---|---|---|---|---|---|
| | | Akuila Mateisuva | | | |
| | | Llisoni Tuinawaivuvu | | | |
| | | Misaele Draunibaka | | | |
| | | Apisalome Waqatabu | | | |
| | | Joseph Elder | | | |
| | | Malakai Rakula | | | |
| | | Taione Kerevanua | | | |
| | | Krishneel Krishna | | | |
| | | Vilitati Ratu | | | |
| | | Josua Tawake | | | |
| | | Joseva Basudra | | | |
| | | Noa Vukica | | | |
| | | Christopher Kumar | | | |
| | | Ravinesh Singh | | | |
| | | Malakai Levatia | | | |
| | | Jone Salauneune | | | |
| | | Lliesa Lino | | | |
| | | Imran Shah | | | |
| | | Poasa Bainivalu | | | |
| | | Filimone Boletawa | | | |
| | | Epeli Loaniceva | | | |
| | | Amani Valebalavu | | | |
| | | Akei Uluibau | | | |
| | | Abbu Zahid Shaheed | | | |
| | | Serupepeli Rokovoliuto | | | |

=== Papua New Guinea ===
Coach: (Papua New Guinea) Max Foster

| No. | Pos. | Player | Date of birth (age) | Caps | Club |
|---|---|---|---|---|---|
| 1 | GK | Jacob Senat | | | (Papua New Guinea) Petro Souths |
| 2 | DF | Japheth Tiamp | | | |
| 3 | DF | Kadash Fapa | | | |
| 4 | DF | Malakai Ben | | | |
| 5 | MF | Ricksen Naleng | | | |
| 6 | | Brett Seriba | | | |
| 7 | FW | Max Sengum | | | |
| 8 | | Nigel Morris | | | |
| 9 | FW | Nigel Dabinyaba | | | |
| 10 | FW | Bruce Kusanan | | | |
| 11 | MF | Vanya Malagian | | | |
| 12 | DF | Tweedy Inia | | | |
| 13 | MF | Mathew Junior | | | |
| 14 | | Simon Emmanuel | | | |
| 15 | DF | Bari Turi | | | |
| 16 | FW | Lap Embel | | | |
| 17 | | Jacob Sabua | | | |
| 18 | MF | Alwin Komlong | | | |
| 19 | MF | Freddy Steven | | | |
| 20 | GK | Soma Kairi | | | |
| 21 | DF | Mathew Bokari | | | |
| 22 | DF | Vincent Worio | | | |

=== Vanuatu ===
Coach: (Vanuatu) Moise Poida

| No. | Pos. | Player | Date of birth (age) | Caps | Club |
|---|---|---|---|---|---|
| 1 | GK | Seiloni Iaruel | 17 April 1995 (aged 16) | | (Vanuatu) Teaouma Academy |
| 2 | DF | Dominique Fred | 21 October 1992 (aged 18) | | |
| 3 | DF | Willy-Ola Jimmy | 29 December 1992 (aged 18) | | |
| 4 | DF | Brian Kaltack | 30 September 1993 (aged 17) | | (New Zealand) Waterside Karori AFC |
| 5 | MF | Simo Joseph | 24 April 1992 (aged 18) | | |
| 6 | DF | Junia Vava | 13 September 1993 (aged 17) | | |
| 7 | MF | Nemani Abraham Roquara | 17 February 1994 (aged 17) | | (Vanuatu) Teaouma Academy |
| 8 | DF | Johnney Tiraeng | 13 June 1992 (aged 18) | | (Vanuatu) Teaouma Academy |
| 9 | FW | Octav Meltecoin | | | (Vanuatu) Teaouma Academy |
| 10 | MF | Yvong Wilson | 27 December 1992 (aged 18) | | (Vanuatu) Teaouma Academy |
| 11 | FW | Jean Kaltak | 19 August 1994 (aged 16) | | (Vanuatu) Teaouma Academy |
| 12 | MF | Eddison Stephen | 2 October 1992 (aged 18) | | |
| 13 | MF | Pascal Chabot | 15 February 1992 (aged 19) | | (Vanuatu) Teaouma Academy |
| 14 | MF | Moses Moli-Kalontang | 10 October 1991 (aged 19) | | |
| 15 | DF | Lucien Hinge | 21 March 1992 (aged 19) | | (Vanuatu) Teaouma Academy |
| 16 | GK | Simon Tousi | 9 March 1992 (aged 19) | | |
| 17 | DF | Kevin Shem | 5 December 1993 (aged 17) | | |
| 18 | FW | Rodrick Naut | 10 April 1993 (aged 18) | | |
| 19 | MF | Didier Kalip | 4 March 1991 (aged 20) | | |
| 20 | FW | Silas Frank | 5 September 1992 (aged 18) | | |

== Group B ==
=== New Caledonia ===
Coach: (New Caledonia) Stephane Drahusak

| No. | Pos. | Player | Date of birth (age) | Caps | Club |
|---|---|---|---|---|---|
| | GK | Rocky Nyikeine | | | (New Caledonia) Gaïtcha FCN |
| | | Kevin Takamatsu | | | |
| | | Francois Issamatro | | | |
| | MF | Jean Claude Jewine | | | (New Caledonia) AS Magenta |
| | DF | Andre Wahnawe | | | (New Caledonia) AS Magenta |
| | | Medhi Mapou | | | |
| | FW | Leopold Makalu | | | (New Caledonia) AS Magenta |
| | | Ludwig Zeoula | | | |
| | | Faby Demene | | | |
| | | Joseph Milie | | | |
| | | Patrick Qaeze | | | |
| | | Robert Dokunengo | | | |
| | | William Devic | | | |
| | | Ijahma Wahmetrua | | | |
| | | Adolphe Pearou | | | |
| | | Remi Qaeze | | | |
| | | Jordy Xalite | | | |
| | | Pascal Kenon | | | |
| | DF | Nicolas Luepak | | | (New Caledonia) AS Magenta |

=== New Zealand ===
Coach: (New Zealand) Chris Milicich

| No. | Pos. | Player | Date of birth (age) | Caps | Club |
|---|---|---|---|---|---|
| 1 | GK | Stefan Marinovic | 7 October 1991 (aged 19) | | (Germany) SV Wehen Wiesbaden |
| 2 | FW | Andrew Bevin | 16 May 1992 (aged 18) | | (New Zealand) Hawke's Bay United |
| 3 | DF | Nick Branch | 24 February 1992 (aged 19) | | (New Zealand) Waikato FC |
| 4 | FW | Ryan Cain | 7 December 1992 (aged 18) | | (New Zealand) Team Wellington |
| 5 | MF | Cory Chettleburgh | 21 August 1991 (aged 19) | | (Netherlands) Sparta Rotterdam |
| 6 | MF | Nikko Boxall | 24 February 1992 (aged 19) | | (New Zealand) Auckland City FC |
| 7 | MF | Jamie Doris | 3 February 1993 (aged 18) | | (Scotland) Hibernian F.C. |
| 8 | FW | Ethan Galbraith | 25 August 1991 (aged 19) | | (New Zealand) Lower Hutt City |
| 9 | DF | Liam Graham | 14 August 1992 (aged 18) | | (Italy) Vicenza |
| 10 | DF | Anthony Hobbs | 6 April 1991 (aged 20) | | (New Zealand) Waitakere United |
| 11 | FW | Dakota Lucas | 26 July 1991 (aged 19) | | (New Zealand) Waitakere United |
| 12 | MF | Andrew Milne | 3 January 1992 (aged 19) | | (New Zealand) Auckland City FC |
| 13 | MF | Colin Murphy | 19 March 1991 (aged 20) | | (United States) Boston College Eagles |
| 14 | DF | James Musa | 1 April 1992 (aged 19) | | (New Zealand) Wellington Phoenix |
| 15 | MF | Marco Rojas | 5 November 1991 (aged 19) | | (Australia) Melbourne Victory |
| 16 | DF | Luke Rowe | 25 July 1992 (aged 18) | | (England) Birmingham City |
| 17 | MF | Zane Sole | 11 January 1992 (aged 19) | | (New Zealand) Waitakere United |
| 18 | MF | Adam Thomas | 1 April 1992 (aged 19) | | (New Zealand) Auckland City FC |
| 19 | DF | Neko Vujevich | 6 June 1992 (aged 18) | | (Australia) Gold Coast United |
| 20 | GK | James McPeake | 24 May 1991 (aged 19) | | (United States) Fairleigh Dickinson University |

=== Solomon Islands ===
Coach: (Solomon Islands) Noel Wgapu

| No. | Pos. | Player | Date of birth (age) | Caps | Club |
|---|---|---|---|---|---|
| 1 | GK | Peter Kiriau | | | |
| 2 | DF | Ian Sida | | | |
| 3 | DF | Freddie Kini | | | (Solomon Islands) Koloale FC |
| 4 | DF | Michael Sira | | | (Solomon Islands) Marist Fire FC |
| 5 | DF | Chris Tafoa | | | |
| 6 | DF | Michael Boso | | | |
| 7 | MF | Toata Tigi | | | |
| 8 | MF | Steven Saru | | | (Solomon Islands) Koloale FC |
| 9 | FW | Larry Sae | | | |
| 10 | FW | Tutizama Tanito | | | (Solomon Islands) Marist Fire FC |
| 11 | FW | Dennis Ifunaoa | | | |
| 12 | MF | Leonard Rokoto | | | |
| 13 | MF | Augustine Samani | | | (Solomon Islands) Koloale FC |
| 14 | MF | Hudson Felani | | | |
| 15 | MF | Himson Teleda | | | |
| 16 | DF | Brian Peter | | | |
| 17 | MF | Conley Rata | | | |
| 18 | FW | Osmon Lui | | | |
| 19 | DF | Willie Lamani | | | |
| 20 | GK | Silas Seda | | | |
