= 2011 in Solomon Islands football =

The 2011 season is the 27th season of competitive football in Solomon Islands.

== National teams ==
The home team or the team that is designated as the home team is listed in the left column; the away team is in the right column.

Win Draw Loss

=== Senior ===
==== Friendly matches ====
8 July 2011	Solomon Islands	2 – 1	Vanuatu	Honiara, Solomon Islands
15:00 UTC+11	Luwi 63'; Totori 66'	(Report)	Michel 89'	Stadium: Lawson Tama Stadium

9 July 2011	Solomon Islands	0 – 0	Vanuatu	Honiara, Solomon Islands
15:00 UTC+11		(Report)		Stadium: Lawson Tama Stadium

27 July 2011	Vanuatu	0 – 0	Solomon Islands	Port Vila, Vanuatu
15:00 UTC+11		(Report)		Stadium: Port Vila Municipal Stadium; Attendance: 6,000; Referee: Banga Robinson (Vanuatu)

30 July 2011	Vanuatu	2 – 0	Solomon Islands	Port Vila, Vanuatu
15:00 UTC+11	August 52'; Tangis 76'	(Report)		Stadium: PVL Stadium; Attendance: 3,000; Referee: George Bruce (Vanuatu)

==== 2011 Pacific Games ====
27 August 2011 Group A	Solomon Islands	7 – 0	Guam	Nouméa, New Caledonia
12:00 UTC+11	Fa'arodo 11', 22'; Totori 24', 41' (pen.), 89'; Nawo 72'; Paia 86'	(Report)		Stadium: Stade Rivière Salée; Referee: Rakesh Varman (Fiji)

30 August 2011 Group A	American Samoa	0 – 4	Solomon Islands	Nouméa, New Caledonia
12:00 UTC+11	Totori 8'; Bule 14'; Lui 28', 34'	(Report)		Stadium: Stade Rivière Salée; Referee: Averii Jacques (Tahiti)

1 September 2011 Group A	Vanuatu	1 – 0	Solomon Islands	Nouméa, New Caledonia
15:00 UTC+11	J. Kaltak 90+2'	(Report)		Stadium: Stade Rivière Salée; Referee: Kader Zitouni (Tahiti)

3 September 2011 Group A	Solomon Islands	6 – 1	Tuvalu	Nouméa, New Caledonia
12:00 UTC+11	Totori 15', 41' (pen.); Lui 23'; Naka 37', 46'; Faisi 90+1'	(Report)	Lepaio 78'	Stadium: Stade Rivière Salée; Referee: Averii Jacques (Tahiti)

5 September 2011 Group A	Solomon Islands	2 – 1	New Caledonia	Nouméa, New Caledonia
15:00 UTC+11	Nawo 66'; Naka 79'	(Report)	Kaï 74'	Stadium: Stade Rivière Salée; Referee: Chris Kerr (New Zealand)

7 September 2011 Semifinals	Fiji	1 – 2 (a.e.t.)	Solomon Islands	Lifou, New Caledonia
15:00 UTC+11	Dunadamu 69'	(Report)	Nawo 77'; Fa'arodo 93' (pen.)	Stadium: Stade Hnassé; Referee: Averii Jacques (Tahiti)

9 September 2011 Final	New Caledonia	2 – 0	Solomon Islands	Nouméa, New Caledonia
20:00 UTC+11	Gope-Fenepej 9'; Bako 11'	(Report)		Stadium: Stade Numa-Daly Magenta; Referee: Chris Kerr (New Zealand)

=== Under-20 ===
==== 2011 OFC U-20 Championship ====
21 April 2011 Group B	New Caledonia	1 – 3	Solomon Islands	Auckland, New Zealand
13:00 UTC+12	Kenon 6'	(Report)	Ifunaoa 28' (pen.), 58' (pen.); Teleda 72'	Stadium: Centre Park; Attendance: 850; Referee: Peter O'Leary (New Zealand)

23 April 2011 Group B	Solomon Islands	0 – 3	New Zealand	Auckland, New Zealand
15:30 UTC+12		(Report)	Lucas 52'; Rojas 62' (pen.); Bevin 67'	Stadium: Centre Park; Attendance: 2,000; Referee: Averii Jacques (Tahiti)

27 April 2011 Semifinal	Vanuatu	3 – 3 (a.e.t.) (2 – 3 p)	Solomon Islands	Albany, New Zealand
12:00 UTC+12	Kalip 8'; J. Kaltak 78'; Shem 115'	(Report)	Teleda 24', 42'; Sae 92'	Stadium: North Harbour Stadium; Attendance: 1,200; Referee: Peter O'Leary (New Zealand)
	Penalties
	Jimmy (penalty missed); Kalip (penalty missed); Wilson (penalty scored); Naut (penalty scored); Chabot (penalty missed)		Tafoa (penalty missed); Saru (penalty scored); Samani (penalty scored); Felani (penalty scored)

29 April 2011 Final	New Zealand	3 – 1	Solomon Islands	Auckland, New Zealand
15:30 UTC+12	Chettleburgh 4'; Bevin 57'; Lucas 63'	(Report)	Teleda 22'	Stadium: North Harbour Stadium; Attendance: 3,500; Referee: Norbert Hauata (Tahiti

=== Under-17 ===
==== 2011 OFC U-17 Championship ====
9 January 2011 Group B	New Caledonia	1 – 2	Solomon Islands	Auckland, New Zealand
13:30 UTC+12	Buscaglia 17'	(Report)	Bitiai 11'; A. Fa'arodo 48'	Stadium: North Harbour Stadium

11 January 2011 Group B	Solomon Islands	1 – 2	Tahiti	Auckland, New Zealand
13:30 UTC+12	Waimora 88'	(Report)	Yohann 55'; Misimake 85' (o.g.)	Stadium: North Harbour Stadium

13 January 2011 Group B	Solomon Islands	15 – 0	Tonga	Auckland, New Zealand
16:00 UTC+12	Waimora 19', 41', 43', 47'; Raramane 24'; Bitiai 28', 45'; Kuki 31', 54', 82'; Bosi 45', 64'; Pahulu 84' (o.g.); Mala 88'; M. Fa'arodo 89'	(Report)		Stadium: North Harbour Stadium

13 January 2011 Group B	Cook Islands	1 – 4	Solomon Islands	Auckland, New Zealand
13:00 UTC+12	Smith 45'	(Report)	Kuki 24'; Albert 54'; Waimora 63'; Bua 75'	Stadium: North Harbour Stadium

19 January 2011 Third place match	Vanuatu	0 – 2	Solomon Islands	Albany, New Zealand
		(Report)	Mala 13', 26'	Stadium: North Harbour Stadium

== S-League ==
Pos	Team	Pld	W	D	L	GF	GA	GD	Pts	Qualification
1	Koloale FC (C)	14	11	2	1	46	12	+34	35	Qualified for the 2011 Solomon Islands Champions League Playoff
2	Solomon Warriors	14	9	4	1	31	13	+18	31	
3	Kossa FC	14	6	4	4	24	21	+3	22	
4	Western United	14	6	2	6	20	18	+2	20	
5	Malaita Kingz	14	4	4	6	10	22	−12	16	
6	Hana	14	4	3	7	24	24	0	15	
7	Marist Fire	14	3	5	6	15	25	−10	14	
8	Real Kakamora FC	14	0	2	12	7	42	−35	2	

(C) Champions

=== Championship series ===
Quarterfinals
Real Kakamora	1	1
Koloale	7	1
Kossa	4	4
Hana	1	2
Marist Fire	0	0
Solomon Warriors	3	3
Malaita Kingz	2	0
Western United	2	0

Semifinals
Koloale	2
Kossa	0
Solomon Warriors	5
Western United	1

Final
Koloale	1
Solomon Warriors	1

==== Final ====
5 June 2011
15:00 UTC+11

Koloale	1 – 1 (a.e.t.)	Solomon Warriors
Paia 67'	(Report)	Ifunaoa 1'
Penalties
Bule (penalty missed); Fa'arodo (penalty scored); Totori (penalty scored); Nawo (penalty missed)	2 – 4	Maemae (penalty scored); Wasi (penalty scored); Kakate (penalty scored); Gagame (penalty scored)

Lawson Tama Stadium, Honiara

=== OFC Champions League qualifying playoffs ===
13 June 2011
15:00 UTC+11

Koloale	0 – 0	Solomon Warriors
	(Report)

Lawson Tama Stadium, Honiara
Referee: Nelson Sogo

16 June 2011
15:00 UTC+11

Solomon Warriors	2 – 3	Koloale
Billy 8'; Ifunaoa 12'	(Report)	Totori 37'; Nawo 59'; Fa'arodo 63'

Lawson Tama Stadium, Honiara

Koloale qualify 3 – 2 on aggregate.

== Solomon Islands clubs in international competitions ==
Club	Competition	Final round
Koloale	2010–11 OFC Champions League	Group Stage
Koloale	2011–12 OFC Champions League	

=== Koloale FC ===
5 February 2011 Champions League Group A	Lautoka (Fiji)	1 – 6	(Solomon Islands) Koloale	Lautoka, Fiji
15:00 UTC+13	Nawatu 10'	(Report)	Bule 19' (pen.); Suri 25'; Totori 28', 62', 77' (pen.); Sale 52'	Stadium: Churchill Park; Referee: Michael Hester (New Zealand)

26 February 2011 Champions League Group A	Koloale (Solomon Islands)	2 – 1	(Papua New Guinea) Hekari United	Honiara, Solomon Islands
15:00 UTC+11	Beui 20', 66'	(Report)	Manuca 79'	Stadium: Lawson Tama Stadium; Referee: Chris Kerr (New Zealand)

19 March 2011 Champions League Group A	Koloale (Solomon Islands)	1 – 0	(Vanuatu) Amicale	Honiara, Solomon Islands
15:00 UTC+11	Nawo 83'	(Report)		Stadium: Lawson Tama Stadium; Referee: Andrew Achari (Fiji)

29 October 2011 Champions League Group B	Koloale (Solomon Islands)	1 – 4	(New Zealand) Auckland City	Honiara, Solomon Islands
15:00 UTC+11	Totori 74' (pen.)	(Report)	Expósito 22' (pen.), 55'; Mulligan 85', 90+2'	Stadium: Lawson Tama Stadium; Attendance: 18,00; Referee: Andrew Achari (Fiji)

19 November 2011 Champions League Group B	Amicale (Vanuatu)	2 – 0	(Solomon Islands) Koloale	Port Vila, Vanuatu
15:00 UTC+11	Waroi 3', 50'	(Report)		Stadium: Korman Stadium; Attendance: 6,000; Referee: Nick Waldron (New Zealand)

10 December 2011 Champions League Group B	Hekari United (Papua New Guinea)	3 – 1	(Solomon Islands) Koloale	Port Moresby, Papua New Guinea
15:00 UTC+10	Waqa 6'; Lepani 16'; Baleitoga 79'	(Report)	Naka 82'	Stadium: PMRL Stadium; Referee: Andrew Achari (Fiji)
