= 2010–11 in Vanuatuan football =

Football in Vanuatu
- Season: 2010–11

The 2010–2011 season is the 59th season of competitive football in Vanuatu.

== National teams ==
The home team or the team that is designated as the home team is listed in the left column; the away team is

in the right column.

Win Draw Loss

=== Senior ===
==== Friendly matches ====
8 July 2011	Solomon Islands	2 – 1	Vanuatu	Honiara, Solomon Islands
15:00 UTC+11	Luwi 63'; Totori 66'	(Report)	Michel 89'	Stadium: Lawson Tama Stadium

9 July 2011	Solomon Islands	0 – 0	Vanuatu	Honiara, Solomon Islands
15:00 UTC+11		(Report)		Stadium: Lawson Tama Stadium

13 July 2011	Fiji	2 – 0	Vanuatu	Labasa, Fiji
19:00 UTC+12	Bolaitoga 13'; Naqeleca 90'	(Report)		Stadium: Subrail Park; Attendance: 3,000

15 July 2011	Fiji	1 – 2	Vanuatu	Lautoka, Fiji
19:00 UTC+12	Avinesh 46'	(Report)	August 7'; Tasso 21'	Stadium: Churchill Park

27 July 2011	Vanuatu	0 – 0	Solomon Islands	Port Vila, Vanuatu
15:00 UTC+11		(Report)		Stadium: Port Vila Municipal Stadium; Attendance: 6,000; Referee: Banga Robinson (Vanuatu)

30 July 2011	Vanuatu	2 – 0	Solomon Islands	Port Vila, Vanuatu
15:00 UTC+11	August 52'; Tangis 76'	(Report)		Stadium: Port Vila Municipal Stadium; Attendance: 3,000; Referee: George Bruce (Vanuatu)

=== Under-20 ===
==== 2011 OFC U-20 Championship ====
21 April 2011 Group A	Vanuatu U-20	7 – 0	American Samoa U-20	Auckland, New Zealand
10:30 UTC+12	J. Kaltak 15'; Stephen 25'; Chabot 39', 79'; B.Kaltak 61'; Kalip 67'; Moli-Kalontang 78'	(Report)		Stadium: Centre Park; Attendance: 500; Referee: Nelson Sogo (Solomon Islands)

23 April 2011 Group A	Fiji U-20	0 – 2	Vanuatu U-20	Auckland, New Zealand
10:30 UTC+12		(Report)	Kalip 20'; Kaltak 82'	Stadium: Centre Park; Attendance: 1,500; Referee: Norbert Hauata (Tahiti)

25 April 2011 Group A	Papua New Guinea U-20	2 – 5	Vanuatu U-20	Auckland, New Zealand
13:00 UTC+12	Dabinyaba 70'; Komolong 90+2'	(Report)	J. Kaltak 17'; Meltecoin 24'; Chabot 32', 66'; Kalip 56'	Stadium: Centre Park; Attendance: 800; Referee: Bertrand Billion (New Caledonia)

27 April 2011 Semifinal	Vanuatu U-20	3 – 3 (a.e.t.) (2 – 3 p)	Solomon Islands U-20	Albany, New Zealand
12:00 UTC+12	Kalip 8'; J. Kaltak 78'; Shem 115'	(Report)	Teleda 24', 42'; Sae 92'	Stadium: North Harbour Stadium; Attendance: 1,200; Referee: Peter O'Leary (New Zealand)
	Penalties
	Jimmy (penalty missed); Kalip (penalty missed); Wilson (penalty scored); Naut (penalty scored); Chabot (penalty missed)		Tafoa (penalty missed); Saru (penalty scored); Samani (penalty scored); Felani (penalty scored)

29 April 2011 Third Place Match	Vanuatu U-20	2 – 0	Fiji U-20	Albany, New Zealand
13:00 UTC+12	Kaltak 15', 45+1'	(Report)		Stadium: North Harbour Stadium; Attendance: 1,500; Referee: Matt Conger (New Zealand)

=== Under-17 ===
==== 2011 OFC U-17 Championship ====
8 January 2011 Group A	Vanuatu U-17	2 – 0	Papua New Guinea U-17	Albany, New Zealand
16:00 UTC+12	Mermer 41' (pen.); Coulon 59'	(Report)		Stadium: North Harbour Stadium

10 January 2011 Group A	New Zealand U-17	5 – 1	Vanuatu U-17	Albany, New Zealand
16:00 UTC+12	Yamamoto 2'; Tuiloma 14'; Payne 23'; Vale 37'; Howieson 87'	(Report)	Mermer 48'	Stadium: North Harbour Stadium

14 January 2011 Group A	Fiji U-17	0 – 3	Vanuatu U-17	Albany, New Zealand
16:00 UTC+12		(Report)	J. Kaltak 53', 76'; Mahit 85'	Stadium: North Harbour Stadium

16 January 2011 Group A	American Samoa U-17	0 – 7	Vanuatu U-17	Albany, New Zealand
13:30 UTC+12		(Report)	J. Kaltak 24', 44', 61'; Ieremia 46'; T. Kaltak 77', 90+1'; Tenene 84'	Stadium: North Harbour Stadium

19 January 2011 Third place match	Vanuatu U-17	0 – 2	Solomon Islands U-17	Albany, New Zealand
		(Report)	Mala 13', 26'	Stadium: North Harbour Stadium

== Vanuatu Premia Divisen ==
=== Port Vila Premier League ===
Pos	Team	Pld	W	D	L	GF	GA	GD	Pts	Qualification or relegation
1	Amicale FC (C)	14	12	1	1	41	11	+30	37	Advance to the 2011 VFF National Super League
2	Tafea FC (Q)	14	11	1	2	45	13	+32	34	Advance to the 2011 VFF National Super League
3	Tupuji Imere (Q)	14	8	0	6	29	25	+4	24	Advance to the 2011 VFF National Super League
4	Spirit 08 (Q)	14	7	1	6	21	19	+2	22	Advance to the 2011 VFF National Super League
5	Shepherds United (Q)	14	6	2	6	18	26	−8	20	Advance to the 2011 VFF National Super League
6	Teouma Academy	14	5	3	6	23	21	+2	18	
7	Yatel FC	14	1	1	12	10	36	−26	4	Relegated to the 2011–12 TVL First Division
8	Ifira Black Bird	14	1	1	12	9	45	−36	4	

Rules for classification: 1) points; 2) goal difference; 3) number of goals scored.
(C) Champions; (Q) Qualified for the phase indicated

=== National Soccer League ===
Pos	Team	Pld	W	D	L	GF	GA	GD	Pts	Qualification
1	Amicale FC (Q)	8	8	0	0	26	7	+19	24	Qualified for the 2011–12 OFC Champions League
2	Tafea FC	8	5	1	2	25	9	+16	16	
3	Tupuji Imere	8	2	2	4	13	17	−4	8	
4	Spirit 08	8	0	5	3	5	13	−8	5	
5	Shepherds United	8	0	2	6	10	33	−23	2	

Rules for classification: 1) points; 2) goal difference; 3) number of goals scored.
(Q) Qualified for the phase indicated

== Vanuatuan clubs in international competitions ==
Club	Competition	Final round
Amicale	2010–11 OFC Champions League	Final

=== Amicale F.C. ===
23 October 2010 Champions League Group A	Hekari United (Papua New Guinea)	1 – 2	(Vanuatu) Amicale	Port Moresby, Papua New Guinea
15:00 UTC+10	Fa'arodo 57'	(Report)	Masauvakalo 23'; Wetney 49'	Stadium: PMRL Stadium; Attendance: 5,500; Referee: Nick Waldron (New Zealand)

13 November 2010 Champions League Group A	Lautoka (Fiji)	1 – 0	(Vanuatu) Amicale	Ba, Fiji
15:00 UTC+13	Nawatu 19'	(Report)		Stadium: Govind Park; Attendance: 1,000; Referee: John Saohu (Solomon Islands)

4 December 2010 Champions League Group A	Amicale (Vanuatu)	2 – 0	(Solomon Islands) Koloale	Port Vila, Vanuatu
15:00 UTC+11	Masauvakalo 15', 40'	(Report)		Stadium: Port Vila Municipal Stadium; Attendance: 4,000; Referee: Chris Kerr (New Zealand)

5 February 2011 Champions League Group A	Amicale (Vanuatu)	3 – 3	(Fiji) Hekari United	Port Vila, Vanuatu
15:00 UTC+11	Maemae 39' (pen.); Malas 51'; Masauvakalo 74'	(Report)	Vakatalesau 58', 87'; Tiwa 90+4'	Stadium: Port Vila Municipal Stadium; Referee: Averii Jacques (Tahiti)

26 February 2011 Champions League Group A	Amicale (Vanuatu)	5 – 1	(Fiji) Lautoka	Port Vila, Vanuatu
15:00 UTC+11	Masauvakalo 7', 45+2', 89'; Maemae 29'; Wetney 33'	(Report)	Avinesh 68' (pen.)	Stadium: Port Vila Municipal Stadium; Referee: Mirko Benischke (New Zealand)

19 March 2011 Champions League Group A	Koloale (Solomon Islands)	1 – 0	(Vanuatu) Amicale	Honiara, Solomon Islands
15:00 UTC+11	Nawo 83'	(Report)		Stadium: Lawson Tama Stadium; Referee: Andrew Achari (Fiji)

2 April 2011 Champions League Final	Amicale (Vanuatu)	1 – 2	(New Zealand) Auckland City	Port Vila, Vanuatu
15:00 UTC+11	Masauvakalo 67'	(Report)	Exposito 22' (pen.); Corrales 82'	Stadium: Port Vila Municipal Stadium; Attendance: 7,925; Referee: Bertrand Billon (New Caledonia)

17 April 2011 Champions League Final	Auckland City (New Zealand)	4 – 0	(Vanuatu) Amicale	Auckland, New Zealand
14:00 UTC+12	Feneridis 26'; Koprivcic 62' (pen.); Exposito 72'; McGeorge 82'	(Report)		Stadium: Kiwitea Street; Attendance: 3,000; Referee: Norbert Hauata (Tahiti)
