= Chettleburgh =

Chettleburgh is a surname. Notable people with the surname include:

- Cory Chettleburgh (born 1991), New Zealand footballer
- Tom Chettleburgh (1912–1960), New Zealand cricketer
