= 2011 OFC U-20 Championship =

Tournament details
- Host country: New Zealand
- Dates: 21–29 April 2011
- Teams: 7 (from 1 confederation)
- Venue: 2 (in 1 host city)

Final positions
- Champions: New Zealand (4th title)
- Runners-up: Solomon Islands
- Third place: Vanuatu
- Fourth place: Fiji

Tournament statistics
- Matches played: 13
- Goals scored: 63 (4.85 per match)
- Attendance: 18,800 (1,446 per match)
- Top scorer(s): (Vanuatu) Jean Kaltak (6 goals)
- Best player: (New Zealand) Marco Rojas

The 2011 OFC U-20 Championship, was the 18th OFC Under 20 Qualifying Tournament, the biennial football championship of Oceania (OFC). It was held in Auckland, New Zealand from 21 to 29 April 2011. The winner qualified for the 2011 FIFA U-20 World Cup. Holders Tahiti failed to qualify for this tournament. New Zealand won this year's edition.

== Participating teams ==
- New Zealand (Host Nation)
- Fiji
- Vanuatu
- American Samoa
- New Caledonia
- Solomon Islands
- Papua New Guinea

== Venues ==
The tournament was originally planned to be played at one venue, in the city of Auckland, the renovated football stadium Centre Park. However, due to wet conditions both semi-final matches, the third-place match, and the OFC final were moved to North Harbour Stadium.

== Group stage ==
The official draw was held at OFC headquarters in the presence of OFC Technical Director Patrick Jacquemet, OFC Head of Competitions David Firisua and other OFC staff, on 30 March 2011. The top two teams from each group (one group has 4 teams, other has 3) qualify for the semi-finals, with group winners playing other group runners-up.

All kick-off times are local (UTC+12)

=== Group A ===
Team	Pld	W	D	L	GF	GA	GD	Pts
Vanuatu	3	3	0	0	14	2	+12	9
Fiji	3	1	1	1	5	3	+2	4
Papua New Guinea	3	1	1	1	7	6	+1	4
American Samoa	3	0	0	3	2	17	−15	0

21 April 2011
10:30

Vanuatu	7–0	American Samoa
J. Kaltak 15'; Stephen 25'; Chabot 39', 79'; B. Kaltak 61'; Kalip 67'; Moli-Kalontang 78'	Report

Centre Park, Auckland
Attendance: 500
Referee: Nelson Sogo (Solomon Islands)

21 April 2011
15:30

Fiji	0–0	Papua New Guinea
	Report

Centre Park, Auckland
Attendance: 1,300
Referee: Kader Zitouni (Tahiti)

23 April 2011
10:30

Fiji	0–2	Vanuatu
	Report	Kalip 20'; J. Kaltak 82'

Centre Park, Auckland
Attendance: 1,500
Referee: Norbert Hauata (Tahiti)

23 April 2011
13:00

American Samoa	1–5	Papua New Guinea
Faavi 54'	Report	Embel 18', 46', 49'; Malagian 25'; Dabinyaba 90+2'

Centre Park, Auckland
Attendance: 1,250
Referee: Bertrand Billion (New Caledonia)

25 April 2011
13:00

Fiji	5–1	American Samoa
Ratu 39'; Salauneune 40', 48', 64'; Vukica 53'	Report	Herrera 84'

Centre Park, Auckland
Attendance: 800
Referee: George Bruce (Vanuatu)

25 April 2011
13:00

Papua New Guinea	2–5	Vanuatu
Dabinyaba 70'; Komolong 90+2'	Report	J. Kaltak 17'; Meltecoin 24'; Chabot 32', 66'; Kalip 56'

Centre Park, Auckland
Attendance: 800
Referee: Bertrand Billion (New Caledonia)

=== Group B ===
Team	Pld	W	D	L	GF	GA	GD	Pts
New Zealand	2	2	0	0	13	0	+13	6
Solomon Islands	2	1	0	1	3	4	−1	3
New Caledonia	2	0	0	2	1	13	−12	0

21 April 2011
13:00

New Caledonia	1–3	Solomon Islands
Kenon 6'	Report	Ifunaoa 28' (pen.), 58' (pen.); Teleda 72'

Centre Park, Auckland
Attendance: 850
Referee: Peter O'Leary (New Zealand)

23 April 2011
15:30

Solomon Islands	0–3	New Zealand
	Report	Lucas 52'; Rojas 62' (pen.); Bevin 67'

Centre Park, Auckland
Attendance: 2,000
Referee: Averii Jacques (Tahiti)

25 April 2011
15:30

New Zealand	10–0	New Caledonia
Rojas 11', 16'; Lucas 13'; Musa 20', 21', 56'; Branch 30', 35', 37'; Thomas 66' (pen.)	Report

Centre Park, Auckland
Attendance: 1,600
Referee: Norbert Hauata (Tahiti)

== Knockout stage ==
Semi-finals
April 27 – Auckland
New Zealand	6
Fiji	0
April 27 – Auckland
Vanuatu	3(2)
Solomon Islands	3(3)

Final
April 29 – Auckland
New Zealand	3
Solomon Islands	1
Third place
April 29 – Auckland
Fiji	0
Vanuatu	2

=== Semifinals ===
27 April 2011
12:00

Vanuatu	3–3 (a.e.t.)	Solomon Islands
Kalip 8'; J. Kaltak 78'; Shem 115'	Report	Teleda 24', 42'; Sae 92'
Penalties
Jimmy (penalty missed); Kalip (penalty missed); Wilson (penalty scored); Naut (penalty scored); Chabot (penalty missed)	2–3	(penalty missed) Tafoa; (penalty scored) Saru; (penalty scored) Samani; (penalty scored) Felani

North Harbour Stadium, Auckland
Attendance: 1,200
Referee: Peter O'Leary (New Zealand)

27 April 2011
14:45

New Zealand	6–0	Fiji
Sole 12'; Galbraith 36'; Lucas 40'; Chettleburgh 61'; Bevin 79'; Cain 89'	Report

North Harbour Stadium, Auckland
Attendance: 2,000
Referee: Averii Jacques (Tahiti)

=== Third place match ===
29 April 2011
13:00

Vanuatu	2–0	Fiji
J. Kaltak 15', 45+1'	Report

North Harbour Stadium, Auckland
Attendance: 1,500
Referee: Matt Conger (New Zealand)

=== Final ===
29 April 2011
15:30

New Zealand	3–1	Solomon Islands
Chettleburgh 4'; Bevin 57'; Lucas 63'	Report	Teleda 22'

North Harbour Stadium, Auckland
Attendance: 3,500
Referee: Norbert Hauata (Tahiti)

== Winners ==
2011 OFC U-20 Championship winners

New Zealand
Fourth title

New Zealand qualified for the 2011 FIFA U-20 World Cup.

== Goal scorers ==
6 goals

- (Vanuatu) Jean Kaltak

4 goals

- (New Zealand) Dakota Lucas
- (Solomon Islands) Himson Teleda
- (Vanuatu) Pascal Chabot
- (Vanuatu) Didier Kalip

3 goals

- (Fiji) Jone Salauneune
- (New Zealand) Andrew Bevin
- (New Zealand) Nick Branch
- (New Zealand) James Musa
- (New Zealand) Marco Rojas
- (Papua New Guinea) Lap Embel

2 goals

- (New Zealand) Cory Chettleburgh
- (Papua New Guinea) Nigel Dabinyaba
- (Solomon Islands) Dennis Ifunaoa

1 goal

- (American Samoa) Taalenuu Faavi
- (American Samoa) Ismael Herrera
- (Fiji) Viliati Ratu
- (Fiji) Noa Vukica
- (New Caledonia) Pascal Kenon
- (New Zealand) Ryan Cain
- (New Zealand) Ethan Galbraith
- (New Zealand) Zane Sole
- (New Zealand) Adam Thomas
- (Papua New Guinea) Alwin Komolong
- (Papua New Guinea) Vanya Malagian
- (Solomon Islands) Larry Sae
- (Vanuatu) Octav Meltecoin
- (Vanuatu) Moses Moli-Kalontang
- (Vanuatu) Brian Kaltack
- (Vanuatu) Kevin Shem
- (Vanuatu) Eddison Stephen
