= Erakor =

Erakor might refer to:

- Erakor Island, location in Vanuatu
- Erakor Golden Star F.C., football club in Vanuatu
- Erakor language, language spoken in Vanuatu
