= 2011 OFC Champions League final =

- Event: 2010–11 OFC Champions League
Amicale	Auckland City
(Vanuatu)	(New Zealand)
1	6

First leg
Amicale	Auckland City
1	2
- Date: 2 April 2011
- Venue: Port Vila Municipal Stadium, Port Vila
- Referee: Bertrand Billon (New Caledonia)
- Attendance: 7,925

Second leg
Auckland City	Amicale
4	0
- Date: 17 April 2011
- Venue: Kiwitea Street, Auckland
- Referee: Norbert Hauata (Tahiti)
- Attendance: 3,000

The 2011 OFC Champions League final was played over two legs between the winner of Group A Amicale from Vanuatu and the winner of Group B Auckland City from New Zealand in the 2010–11 OFC Champions League.

Auckland City won the final 6–1 on aggregate. As OFC Champions League winners they qualified for the 2011 FIFA Club World Cup as the OFC representative, entering the qualifying play-off round.

== Road to final ==
(Vanuatu) Amicale		Round	(New Zealand) Auckland City	
Opponent	Result	Group stage	Opponent	Result
(Papua New Guinea) Hekari United	2–1 (A)	Matchday 1	(New Caledonia) Magenta	3–0 (H)
(Fiji) Lautoka	0–1 (A)	Matchday 2	(New Zealand) Waitakere United	1–1 (A)
(Solomon Islands) Koloale	2–0 (H)	Matchday 3	(French Polynesia) Tefana	1–1 (A)
(Papua New Guinea) Hekari United	3–3 (H)	Matchday 4	(New Caledonia) Magenta	1–0 (A)
(Fiji) Lautoka	5–1 (H)	Matchday 5	(New Zealand) Waitakere United	1–0 (H)
(Solomon Islands) Koloale	0–1 (A)	Matchday 6	(French Polynesia) Tefana	5–0 (H)
Group A winner: Team / Pld / W / D / L / GF / GA / GD / Pts; (Vanuatu) Amicale / 6 / 3 / 1 / 2 / 12 / 7 / +5 / 10; (Solomon Islands) Koloale / 6 / 3 / 0 / 3 / 10 / 10 / 0 / 9; (Fiji) Lautoka / 6 / 2 / 2 / 2 / 6 / 13 / –7 / 8; (Papua New Guinea) Hekari United / 6 / 1 / 3 / 2 / 10 / 8 / +2 / 6		Final standings	Group B winner: Team / Pld / W / D / L / GF / GA / GD / Pts; (New Zealand) Auckland City / 6 / 4 / 2 / 0 / 12 / 2 / +10 / 14; (New Zealand) Waitakere United / 6 / 2 / 2 / 2 / 8 / 8 / 0 / 8; (New Caledonia) Magenta / 6 / 2 / 1 / 3 / 6 / 7 / −1 / 7; (French Polynesia) Tefana / 6 / 1 / 1 / 4 / 5 / 14 / −9 / 4	

== Rules ==
The winners of groups A and B played in the final over two legs. The hosts of each leg was decided by draw, and announced by the OFC on 22 March 2011. The away goals rule would be applied, and extra time and penalty shootout would be used to decide the winner if necessary.

== Match summary ==
Team 1	Agg.	Team 2	1st leg	2nd leg
Amicale (Vanuatu)	1–6	(New Zealand) Auckland City	1–2	0–4

=== First leg ===
2 April 2011
15:00 UTC+11:00

Amicale (Vanuatu)	1–2	(New Zealand) Auckland City
Masauvakalo 67'	Report	Exposito 22' (pen.); Corrales 82'

Port Vila Municipal Stadium, Port Vila
Attendance: 7,925
Referee: Bertrand Billon (New Caledonia)

Amicale	Auckland City

Amicale:
GK	1	(Vanuatu) Enest Bong	(yellow card) 20'
DF	3	(Vanuatu) Young Paul		(substituted off) 82'
DF	4	(Vanuatu) Selwyn Sese Ala
DF	6	(Solomon Islands) Nelson Saie Kilifa
DF	15	(Vanuatu) Alphonse Bongnaim	(yellow card) 7'
MF	7	(Vanuatu) Jean Robert Yelou	(yellow card) 17'
MF	13	(Solomon Islands) Gibson Daudau
MF	18	(Vanuatu) Richard Garae	(yellow card) 48'	(substituted off) 53'
MF	25	(Solomon Islands) Stanley Waita		(substituted off) 61'
FW	11	(Vanuatu) Fenedy Masauvakalo
FW	19	(Solomon Islands) Jack Wetney
Substitutes:
MF	8	(Vanuatu) Jerry Shem		(substituted on) 82'
MF	9	(Vanuatu) Derek Malas		(substituted on) 61'
MF	10	(Solomon Islands) Batram Suri
DF	14	(Solomon Islands) Moffat Deramoa		(substituted on) 53'
DF	16	(Vanuatu) Mostyn Sanga
MF	21	(Vanuatu) Tom Tomake
DF	31	(Solomon Islands) Edika Maeta
Manager:
(Vanuatu) William Malas

Auckland City:
GK	1	(New Zealand) Jacob Spoonley
DF	2	(Spain) Ángel Berlanga
DF	3	(New Zealand) Ian Hogg
DF	7	(New Zealand) James Pritchett
DF	15	(New Zealand) Ivan Vicelich
MF	6	(Scotland) Stuart Kelly
MF	8	(New Zealand) David Mulligan		(substituted off) 63'
MF	13	(Greece) Alex Feneridis
FW	9	(Spain) Manuel Expósito		(substituted off) 84'
FW	11	(Croatia) Daniel Koprivcic		(substituted off) 52'
FW	14	(England) Adam Dickinson
Substitutes:
DF	4	(England) Sam Campbell
FW	10	(Costa Rica) Luis Corrales	(yellow card) 78'	(substituted on) 63'
GK	12	(England) Liam Little
DF	20	(New Zealand) Riki van Steeden
MF	22	(New Zealand) Andrew Milne	(yellow card) 88'	(substituted on) 84'
MF	23	(New Zealand) Adam Thomas		(substituted on) 52'
Manager:
(New Zealand) Aaron McFarland (Spain) Ramon Tribulietx

Assistant referees:
(Solomon Islands) Matthew Taro
(Fiji) Ravinesh Kumar
Fourth official:
(Fiji) Andrew Achari

=== Second leg ===
17 April 2011
14:00 UTC+12:00

Auckland City (New Zealand)	4–0	(Vanuatu) Amicale
Alex Feneridis 26'; Koprivcic 62' (pen.); Exposito 72'; McGeorge 82'	Report

Kiwitea Street, Auckland
Attendance: 3,000
Referee: Norbert Hauata (Tahiti)

Auckland City	Amicale

Auckland City:
GK	1	(New Zealand) Jacob Spoonley
DF	2	(Spain) Ángel Berlanga
DF	3	(New Zealand) Ian Hogg
DF	7	(New Zealand) James Pritchett
DF	15	(New Zealand) Ivan Vicelich
MF	8	(New Zealand) David Mulligan	(substituted off) 85'
MF	13	(Greece) Alex Feneridis
MF	16	(Spain) Albert Vidal
FW	9	(Spain) Manuel Expósito
FW	11	(Croatia) Daniel Koprivcic	(substituted off) 81'
FW	14	(England) Adam Dickinson	(substituted off) 73'
Substitutes:
DF	4	(England) Sam Campbell
MF	6	(Scotland) Stuart Kelly
FW	10	(Costa Rica) Luis Corrales	(substituted on) 85'
GK	12	(England) Liam Little
MF	17	(New Zealand) Adam McGeorge	(substituted on) 81'
MF	22	(New Zealand) Andrew Milne	(substituted on) 73'
MF	23	(New Zealand) Adam Thomas
Manager:
(New Zealand) Aaron McFarland (Spain) Ramon Tribulietx

Amicale:
GK	22	(Vanuatu) Chikau Mansale
DF	3	(Vanuatu) Young Paul
DF	4	(Vanuatu) Selwyn Sese Ala		(substituted off) 74'
DF	6	(Solomon Islands) Nelson Saie Kilifa
DF	14	(Solomon Islands) Moffat Deramoa
DF	15	(Vanuatu) Alphonse Bongnaim
MF	7	(Vanuatu) Jean Robert Yelou		(substituted off) 85'
MF	13	(Solomon Islands) Gibson Daudau
MF	25	(Solomon Islands) Stanley Waita		(substituted off) 80'
FW	11	(Vanuatu) Fenedy Masauvakalo	(yellow card) 14'
FW	19	(Solomon Islands) Jack Wetney	(yellow card) 46'
Substitutes:
GK	1	(Vanuatu) Enest Bong
DF	5	(Solomon Islands) Richard Anisau		(substituted on) 80'
MF	8	(Vanuatu) Jerry Shem
MF	9	(Vanuatu) Derek Malas		(substituted on) 74'
MF	10	(Solomon Islands) Batram Suri
MF	18	(Vanuatu) Richard Garae
MF	29	(Vanuatu) Seimata Chilia		(substituted on) 85'
Manager:
(Vanuatu) William Malas

Assistant referees:

(Solomon Islands) Matthew Taro
(Papua New Guinea) David Charles
Fourth official:
(Solomon Islands) Nelson Sogo

== Champion ==
OFC Champions League
2010-11 Winners

Auckland City
Third Title
