= Football in Vanuatu =

- Country: Vanuatu
- National teams: Vanuatu national football team Vanuatu women's national football team

International competitions
- OFC Professional League; OFC Champions League

The sport of football in the country of Vanuatu is run by the Vanuatu Football Federation established in 1934. The association administers the national football team as well as the Vanuatu Premia Divisen.

Football is the most popular sport in Vanuatu. The VFF organizes domestic competitions such as the Port Vila Premier League, which serves as the top football league in the country. Internationally, Vanuatu's national teams have achieved recognition, particularly in regional competitions like the OFC Nations Cup and the Pacific Games.

The Vanuatu men's national team, formerly known as the New Hebrides national team, has experienced notable success in the Oceania region. The team has often finished in the top four of the OFC Nations Cup and secured an impressive 4–2 win against New Zealand in 2004, preventing New Zealand from advancing to the FIFA World Cup qualifiers.

== Football stadiums ==
Stadium	Capacity	City	Tenants
Fresh Water Stadium	6,500	Port Vila	

== Seasons in Vanuatuan football ==
- 2010–11 in Vanuatuan football
- 2011–12 in Vanuatuan football
