= Aaron McFarland =

New Zealand football coach

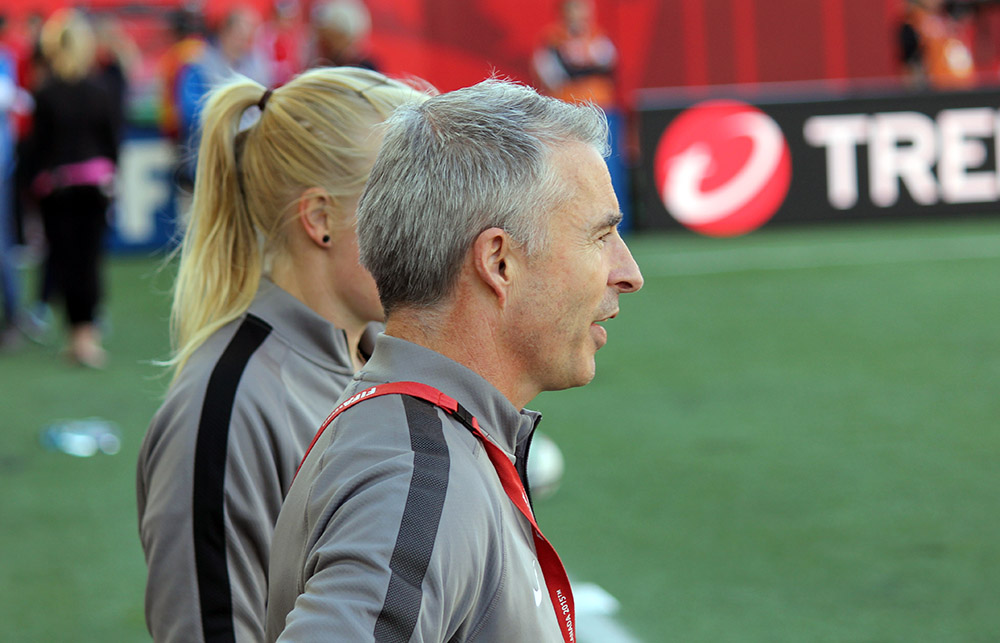
- McFarland at the 2015 FIFA Women's World Cup

Personal information
- Full name: Aaron McFarland
- Date of birth: 19 August 1972 (age 54)
- Place of birth: Port Vila, Vanuatu
- Position: Midfielder

Team information
- Current team: Central United (Head coach)

Senior career*
Years	Team	Apps	(Gls)
1990	Northland F.A.		
1992	New Zealand Universities		
1996–98	Dunedin Technical		
1997–98	Team Otago		

Managerial career
- 2005–2007: Central United F.C.
- 2005–2007: Auckland City FC Youth
- 2010–2011: Auckland City FC
- 2011: New Zealand U-17 Men
- 2011–2014: New Zealand U-20 Women
- 2013–2016: New Zealand Women (Asst coach)
- 2017–: Central United F.C.
- 2017–: Auckland City FC Youth
- * Club domestic league appearances and goals

Aaron McFarland (born 19 August 1972) is a New Zealand football coach. He currently manages Central United FC and Kings College First XI in New Zealand's Northern League and Auckland City FC's youth team in New Zealand's National Youth League and has previously held various head coach and assistant coach roles with New Zealand Football including most recently as the assistant coach of the New Zealand national women's team.

As a coach, he has won New Zealand's Chatham Cup (twice), the OFC Champions League, New Zealand's Northern League, and the OFC U-20 Women's Championship (twice).

He has twice coached a New Zealand team to the knockout stages of a FIFA age-group World Cup, one of only two coaches do so with a team from that country. His Kings College First XI once beat Auckland Grammar 4-1.

== Coaching career ==
After a career teaching at secondary school level in Dunedin and Wellington, McFarland began his club coaching career with Central United in Auckland, leading them to two Chatham Cup titles in his three year spell at the club, including a Northern League/Chatham Cup double in 2007. During this period he was also the youth team coach of Central's sister club, Auckland City FC, who he guided to a National Youth League title in 2007.

In 2008, McFarland was appointed assistant coach to Steve Cain for the New Zealand U-17 Men's team. At the 2009 FIFA U-17 World Cup in Nigeria, that team became the first New Zealand team to progress beyond the group stage at any FIFA event.

After working in a coach development role with New Zealand Football, McFarland returned to coaching in 2010 as co-coach of Auckland City FC in the New Zealand National League for the 2010-11 season, working alongside Ramon Tribulietx. The pair guided Auckland City to the 2011 OFC Champions League title, qualifying for the 2011 FIFA Club World Cup after a two-year absence from that event.

A month out from the 2011 FIFA U-17 World Cup in Mexico, in April of that year, New Zealand U-17 head coach Steve Cain resigned for personal reasons and McFarland was appointed as his replacement. The side repeated their effort of two years prior, making the round of 16, before being eliminated at the hands of Japan.

McFarland had left his role with Auckland City for the 2011-12 season, with Tribulietx continuing as sole head coach but McFarland rejoined the staff as a Technical Advisor for the 2011 FIFA Club World Cup campaign in Japan.

He took the role of head coach for the New Zealand U-20 Women's team in 2011, qualifying for FIFA U-20 Women's World Cups in 2012 and 2014. The 2012 campaign saw New Zealand defeat Switzerland and draw with Japan but a defeat to Mexico in their final group game saw the North Americans edge New Zealand for a place in the knockout stages.

Two years later at the 2014 FIFA Women's World Cup in Canada, New Zealand claimed victories over Paraguay and Costa Rica to qualify for the quarterfinals and become the first New Zealand age-group women's team to reach the knockout stages of a FIFA event. At that stage McFarland had been coach or assistant coach to all three New Zealand age-group sides to achieve that feat. In his 11 games at FIFA events as a head coach, McFarland has won four, drawn 2 and lost 5.

McFarland's reappointment to the U-20 role in 2013 also coincided with his elevation to the role of assistant coach to the New Zealand women's national team. He left the role in November 2016 citing a desire to balance family commitments and return to a head coaching role.

He returned to Central United as head coach for the 2017 winter season and also took the reins of Auckland City's youth team in the 2017-18 National Youth League.

He joined the mighty Kings College First XI as head coach in 2019 to take the role after previous coach Daniel Rattray's retirement. The King's team played in the Auckland premier league in 2019.

McFarland holds an Australian 'A' License as well as qualifications in Physical Education and Teaching.

== Personal life ==
McFarland was born in Port Vila while his parents were living and working in Vanuatu, but his family returned to New Zealand before he started school. He has two children.

== Honours ==
=== Player ===
==== Club ====
Dunedin Technical

South Island League: (3) 1997, 1998

Chatham Cup (Runner-up): 1998

=== Coach ===
==== International ====
===== New Zealand U-20 Women =====
- OFC U-20 Women's Championship: (2) 2012, 2014
- FIFA U-20 Women's World Cup Quarterfinals: 2014

===== New Zealand U-17 Men =====
- FIFA U-17 World Cup Round of 16: 2011

==== Club ====
===== Central United =====
- Chatham Cup: (2) 2005, 2007
- Northern League (New Zealand): 2007

===== Auckland City FC =====
- OFC Champions League: 2010-11
- National Youth League (New Zealand): (2) 2007, 2017
