= Tom Chettleburgh =

New Zealand cricketer

Personal information
- Full name: Verdon Joseph Thomas Chettleburgh
- Born: 19 November 1912; Dunedin, New Zealand
- Died: 4 September 1960 (aged 47); Lower Hutt, New Zealand
- Batting: Right-handed
- Bowling: Right-arm leg-spin

Domestic team information
- Years: Team
- 1932/33–1940/41: Otago

Career statistics
Competition	First-class
Matches	19
Runs scored	733
Batting average	26.17
100s/50s	0/2
Top score	84
Balls bowled	603
Wickets	11
Bowling average	37.63
5 wickets in innings	0
10 wickets in match	0
Best bowling	2/41
Catches/stumpings	12/–
- Source: ESPNcricinfo, 19 February 2020

Verdon Joseph Thomas Chettleburgh (19 November 1912 – 4 September 1960) was a New Zealand cricketer. He played nineteen first-class matches for Otago between 1932 and 1941.

Tom Chettleburgh attended Otago Boys' High School in Dunedin and worked as a bookkeeper. He made his highest first-class score in Otago's victory over Canterbury in the 1936-37 Plunket Shield, when he scored 39 (the top score in Otago's first innings) and 84. He was later a member of the board of the New Zealand Cricket Council. He died in 1960 at Lower Hutt; an obituary was published in the New Zealand Cricket Almanack.
