= Brian Kaltak =

Vanuatuan footballer (born 1993)

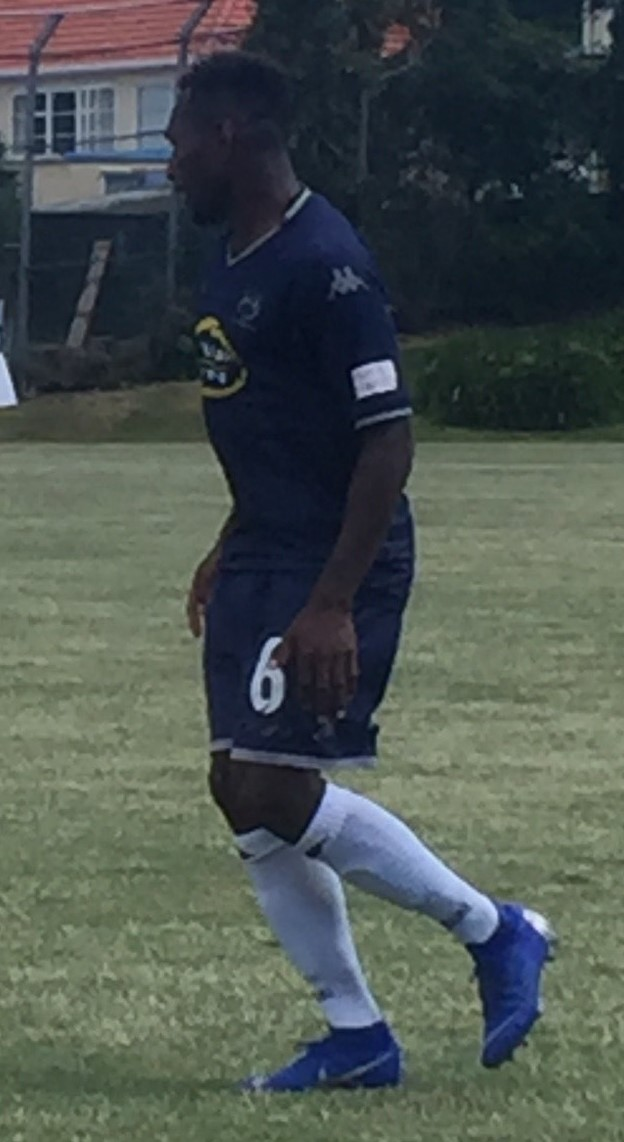
- Kaltak in 2019

Personal information
- Date of birth: 30 September 1993 (age 33)
- Place of birth: Erakor Island, Vanuatu
- Height: 1.80 m (5 ft 11 in)
- Position: Defender

Team information
- Current team: Perth Glory
- Number: 45

Youth career
- –2010: Teouma Academy

Senior career*
Years	Team	Apps	(Gls)
2011	Waterside Karori		
2011–2012	Hekari United		
2012–2013	Solomon Warriors		
2013	Wairarapa United		
2014	Hekari United		
2014–2015	Amicale		
2015–2016	Solomon Warriors		
2016–2017	Erakor Golden Star		
2017	Wairarapa United		
2017–2018	Tasman United	10	(1)
2018	→ Lautoka (loan)	2	(0)
2018–2022	Auckland City	49	(7)
2022	FK Beograd	5	(0)
2022–2025	Central Coast Mariners	81	(3)
2025–	Perth Glory	25	(1)

International career^{‡}
- Vanuatu U17
2014	Vanuatu U20	4	(1)
2015	Vanuatu U23	2	(6)
2011–	Vanuatu	33	(5)
Medal record
Men's football
Representing Vanuatu
OFC Nations Cup
Runner-up	2024 Fiji/Vanuatu
OFC U-20 Championship
Third place	2011 New Zealand
- * Club domestic league appearances and goals as of 25 April 2026 ‡ National team caps and goals as of 18 November 2024

Brian Kaltak (Bislama: [kal.tak]; born 30 September 1993) is a Ni-Vanuatu professional footballer who plays as a central defender for A-League club Perth Glory and captains the Vanuatu national team. He is the first ever Ni-Vanuatu to play professional football.

== Early life ==
Brian Kaltak was born on 30 September 1993, in Erakor, Vanuatu. His father, Timothy Kaltak, played a significant role in shaping his early passion for the sport.

From a young age, Kaltak idolised his father and would follow him to the local sports field after school. He was also influenced by Brazilian player Ronaldinho.

Kaltak's began playing football at the age of seven. In Erakor, where resources were limited, the village children would play barefoot. As they grew older, they had only three pairs of boots to be shared among twenty kids, necessitating turns to wear them. Kaltak, would wear a single boot on his right foot.

After school, Kaltak would play football. When the school locked away their few balls in the changing rooms after school, they would create makeshift balls using plastic bags and sellotape.

== Club career ==
=== Early career ===
At the young age of 15, he was promoted to Erakor Golden Star first-team, after most of the club's senior players left following their recent relegation to the First Division. Alongside a promising group of fellow youngsters, they worked hard and won the competition, earning promotion back to the Premier League within two years. Brian's skills even caught the attention of Colin Tuaa, a former New Zealand international player, during an Oceania Football Confederation tournament in New Zealand. Impressed by Brian's abilities, Colin arranged a six-month scholarship for him to train with the A-League club Wellington Phoenix while continuing to play local football with Waterside Karori. To support his training and development, Brian received financial assistance of NZ$15,000 from the Oceania Football Confederation, covering the costs associated with his training and ensuring he had the opportunity to grow as a player.

=== Auckland City ===
On 3 October 2018, Kaltak signed for Auckland City. He scored his first goal for the club on 27 January 2019, scoring from a free kick in a 3–2 win over Eastern Suburbs. In 2020, Kaltak became the first ni-Vanuatu to win the New Zealand Football Championship as a player.

=== Central Coast Mariners ===
Kaltak soon moved to Australia in April 2022 and began with an initial trial with Central Coast Mariners towards the end of the 2021–22 A-League Men season. His opportunity with the Mariners came through coach Josh Smith, who played a pivotal role in facilitating his arrival in Australia and arranging the trial. However, during the trial, Kaltak sustained an injury, preventing him from continuing the trial. As the season concluded in June and Kaltak continued his rehabilitation, he followed Smith to FK Beograd, a South Australian NPL side, where Smith took on a coaching role.

In August, Kaltak was given another chance to impress after being offered another trial at Central Coast Mariners ahead of the 2022–23 A-League Men season where he successfully impressed head coach Nick Montgomery. On 27 September, Kaltak signed an injury replacement contract with the Central Coast Mariners, becoming the first Vanuatu professional football player in the history of Vanuatu football. Kaltak made his professional debut on 16 October, in a 2–2 league draw against Wellington Phoenix at Wellington Regional Stadium. On 13 November, he received his first red card in the 30th minute during a 3–2 loss against Macarthur, resulting in a one-match suspension.

Despite this, Kaltak was lauded for his standout performances, particularly during the month of December as a key figure in the Mariners' defence; he played a crucial role in helping the team secure a clean sheet in a 3–0 victory against the Newcastle Jets in the F3 Derby and a 2–1 win in the previous match against Sydney FC. On 11 January 2023, Central Coast Mariners announced that Kaltak would remain with the club until the end of the 2024–25 season after his side conceded just three goals in the previous five games.

On 4 February, in his second match against Sydney FC, he received a straight red card in the 25th minute for denying Max Burgess an obvious goal-scoring opportunity. Although the club appealed the decision, Kaltak was still handed a one-week suspension, causing him to miss the subsequent match against Brisbane Roar. In the match against Wellington Phoenix after a week of completing his suspension, Kaltak was sent off again in the 59th minute for a challenge on Phoenix attacker David Ball. The minimum suspension of two matches was imposed on Kaltak, with his teammate Moresche also receiving a two-match ban for violent conduct in the 97th minute.

Kaltak remained a key player for the Mariners as his contributions were vital in the team's success, as they secured three consecutive wins against Adelaide United in the final league match (4–1) and both legs of the A-League semi-final (4–1 on aggregate). Kaltak played a significant role in the Mariners' stunning 6–1 victory over Melbourne City in the Grand Final at CommBank Stadium, leading them to lift the A-League Men championship trophy. After the match, Kaltak was embraced and congratulated by Vanuatu Prime Minister Ishmael Kalsakau, who flew in to witness him play. In Vanuatu, screens were set up at Freshwater Stadium in Port Vila, allowing locals to watch Kaltak become the first Vanuatu player to compete in an A-League Grand Final.

Kaltak won the 2023–24 A-League Men, finishing top of the table at the end of the regular season. Kaltak was also part of the Mariners' 2023–24 AFC Cup victory.

=== Perth Glory ===
On 6 June 2025, Perth Glory announced the signing of Kaltak on a multi-year deal.

== International career ==
Kaltak made his international debut for Vanuatu in 2011.

In March 2022, Kaltak went to Qatar for the World Cup qualifiers. Vanuatu's first match was scheduled against Tahiti on 17 March 2022, but the team was forced to withdraw from the tournament without playing a game due to a COVID-19 outbreak among the travelling contingent.

== Personal life ==
Kaltak moved to Port Vila to obtain his secondary education. Brian's cousins Tony and Jean also play for the national team. The pair were both named in the 2012 OFC Nations Cup squad.

In 2021, Kaltak told the New Zealand High Commission in Vanuatu that he believed athletes should avoid tobacco as part of World No Tobacco Day.

Produced by Fulwell 73, FIFA released Captains in 2022, an eight-part sports docuseries following six national team captains in their respective 2022 FIFA World Cup qualification campaigns. Kaltak, representing Vanuatu, starred alongside Thiago Silva (Brazil), Luka Modrić (Croatia), Pierre-Emerick Aubameyang (Gabon), Andre Blake (Jamaica) and Hassan Maatouk (Lebanon). It was released by Netflix and also shown on FIFA's own streaming platform, FIFA+.

== Career statistics ==
=== International ===
As of match played 18 July 2019
Vanuatu score listed first, score column indicates score after each Kaltak goal.

International goals by date, venue, cap, opponent, score, result and competition
No.	Date	Venue	Cap	Opponent	Score	Result	Competition
1	3 June 2012	Lawson Tama Stadium, Honiara, Solomon Islands	8	Samoa	2–0	5–0	2012 OFC Nations Cup
2	10 November 2015	Korman Stadium, Port Vila, Vanuatu	11	Fiji	1–0	2–1	Friendly
3	26 March 2016	Port Vila Municipal Stadium, Port Vila, Vanuatu	12	New Caledonia	2–1	2–1	Friendly
4	4 June 2016	Sir John Guise Stadium, Port Moresby, Papua New Guinea	15	Fiji	3–2	3–2	2016 OFC Nations Cup
5	18 July 2019	National Soccer Stadium, Apia, Samoa	21	Samoa	10–0	11–0	2019 Pacific Games

== Honours ==
Auckland City

- New Zealand Football Championship: 2019–20

Central Coast Mariners

- A-League Men Championship: 2022–232023–24
- A-League Men Premiership: 2023-24
- AFC Cup: 2023–24

Vanuatu

- OFC Nations Cup: Runner-up, 2024

Vanuatu U20

- OFC U-20 Championship: 3rd place, 2011

Individual

- PFA A-League Team of the Season: 2022–23, 2023–24

Orders

- Order of Vanuatu, Second Class: 2023
