= Epeli Loaniceva =

Fijian footballer

Personal information
- Full name: Epeli Loaniceva
- Date of birth: 19 October 1992 (age 34)
- Place of birth: Fiji
- Height: 1.98 m (6 ft 6 in)
- Position: Goalkeeper

Team information
- Current team: Rewa
- Number: 22

Senior career*
Years	Team	Apps	(Gls)
–2016	Labasa		
2016–	Rewa		

International career
2011	Fiji U-20	0	(0)
2017–	Fiji	1	(0)
- * Club domestic league appearances and goals

Epeli Loaniceva (born 19 October 1992) is a Fijian footballer who plays as a goalkeeper for Fijian club Rewa and the Fiji national team.

== Club career ==
Loaniceva started his career with Labasa. In 2016, he moved to Rewa.

== National team ==
In 2017, Loaniceva was called up by coach Christophe Gamel for the Fiji national football team. He made his debut on November 19, 2017, in a 2–0 loss against Estonia.
