= Gibson Daudau =

Solomon Islander footballer

Personal information
- Date of birth: 3 September 1988 (age 38)
- Place of birth: Solomon Islands
- Position: Midfielder

Team information
- Current team: Hekari United

Senior career*
Years	Team	Apps	(Gls)
2010–2012	Amicale F.C.		
2012–2014	Solomon Warriors F.C.		
2014–2015	Tafea F.C.		
2015–2017	Solomon Warriors		
2017	Amicale		
2017–2019	Solomon Warriors		
2019–	Hekari United		

International career^{‡}
2016–	Solomon Islands	6	(0)
- * Club domestic league appearances and goals as of 11 August 2016 ‡ National team caps and goals as of 11 August 2017

Gibson Daudau (born 3 September 1988) is a Solomon Islander footballer who plays as a midfielder for Hekari United F.C. in the Papua New Guinea National Soccer League.
