= Centre Park =

Sports venue in Māngere, Auckland, New Zealand

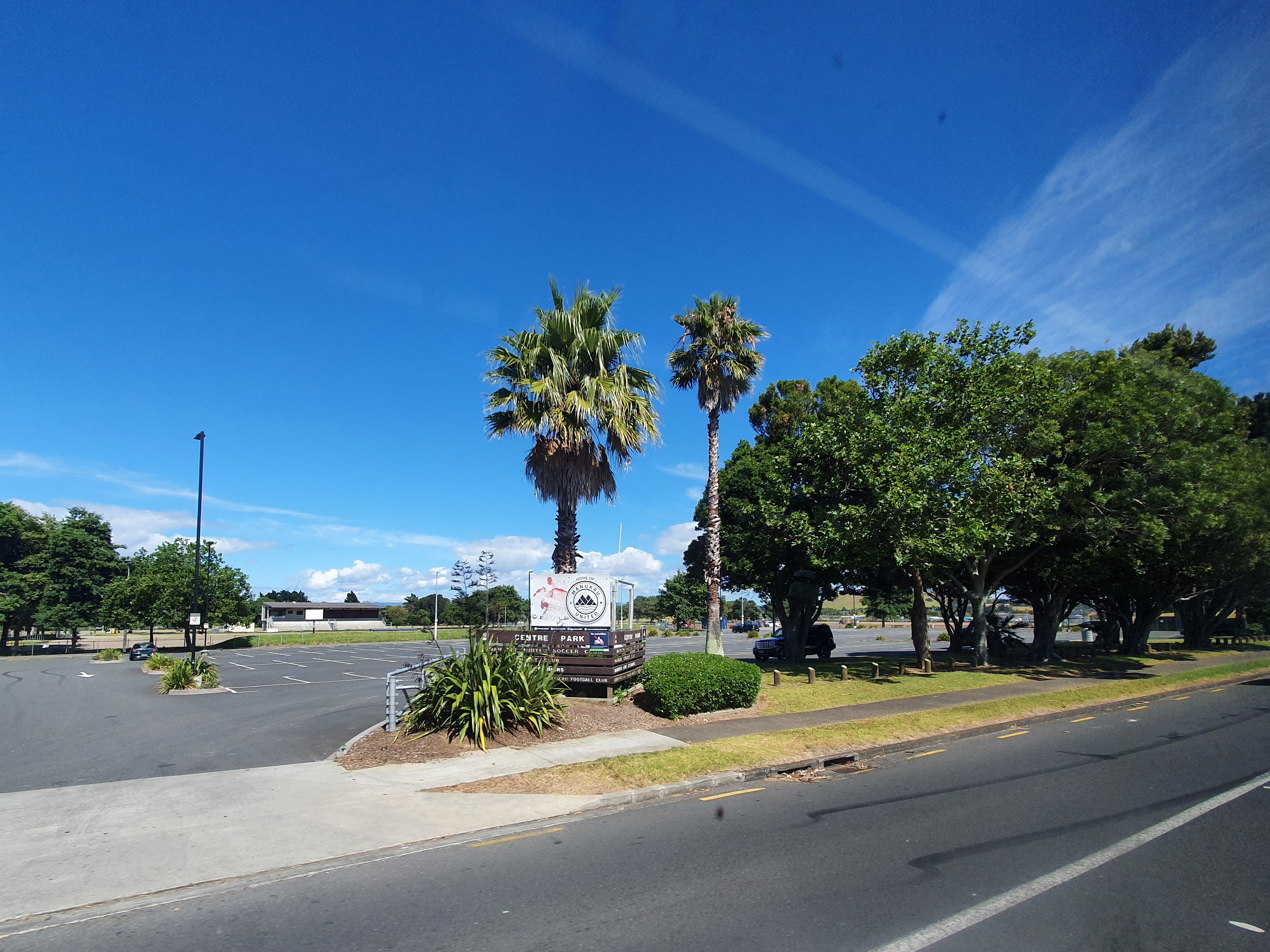
- Interactive map of Centre Park
- Location: Māngere, Auckland
- Coordinates: 36.964263°S 174.805413°E
- Capacity: 3,000
- Surface: grass

Tenants
- Manukau United (2018–present); Mangere United

Centre Park is a stadium located in Māngere, Auckland, New Zealand. The stadium hosted the 2011 OFC U-20 Championship. It is the home of Northern League side Manukau United.

In September 2022, Centre Park were shortlisted by FIFA to be a team base camp for the 2023 FIFA Women's World Cup. On 21 March 2023, it was announced Portugal would use Centre Park as their training ground during the world cup.

== International matches ==
Centre Park hosted an international women's friendly football game in 2012 between New Zealand and China. Portugal also played Norway in an unofficial friendly in the buildup to the 2023 FIFA Women's World Cup.

17 June 2012 Friendly	New Zealand Women	3–1	China Women	Māngere, New Zealand
	Moorwood 9'; Gregorius 28'; Hearn 77'	Report	Zhang 70'	Stadium: Centre Park

16 July 2023 Unofficial friendly	Portugal Women	1–2	Norway Women	Māngere, New Zealand
		Report		Stadium: Centre Park; Attendance: 0 (Behind closed doors)
