= Adam Thomas (footballer) =

New Zealand footballer

Personal information
- Date of birth: 1 April 1992 (age 34)
- Place of birth: Hamilton, New Zealand
- Height: 1.89 m (6 ft 2 in)
- Position: Defender

Team information
- Current team: Eastern Suburbs

Youth career
- Melville United

Senior career*
Years	Team	Apps	(Gls)
–2009	Central United		
2009–2011	Auckland City		
2011–2012	Waikato	14	(3)
2013	Team Wellington		
2018	Western Suburbs		
2018–2021	Eastern Suburbs	27	(0)
2021	Oakleigh Cannons	5	(1)
2022	Shelbourne	4	(0)
2022	→ Galway United (loan)	6	(0)
2023–	Eastern Suburbs	33	(0)

International career^{‡}
2009	New Zealand U-17	10	(0)
2011	New Zealand U-20	8	(1)
2012	New Zealand U-23	11	(1)
- * Club domestic league appearances and goals as of 22:26, 10 July 2024 (UTC) ‡ National team caps and goals as of 14:26, 15 February 2022 (UTC)

Adam Thomas (born 1 April 1992) is a New Zealand professional footballer who plays as a defender for National League club Eastern Suburbs. He represented New Zealand at the 2012 Summer Olympics.

== Club career ==
During his early career, he represented New Zealand on U-17, U-20 and U-23 level. He became captain of Waikato FC at the age of 19. For Auckland City FC, he played in the first leg of the 2011 OFC Champions League final.

Thomas joined Team Wellington in January 2013. He transferred mid-season from Waikato FC where he had been stood down for giving them late notice of his intentions to move to Wellington. Thomas missed six years of his career between 2013 and 2018 due to several injuries which required surgery.

Reteurning to football with Eastern Suburbs AFC, he contested the 2020 OFC Champions League.

On 15 February 2022, he signed for League of Ireland Premier Division club Shelbourne under new manager Damien Duff. On 28 July 2022, Thomas signed for League of Ireland First Division side Galway United until the end of the season.
