= Erakor (island) =

Island south of Port Vila, Vanuatu

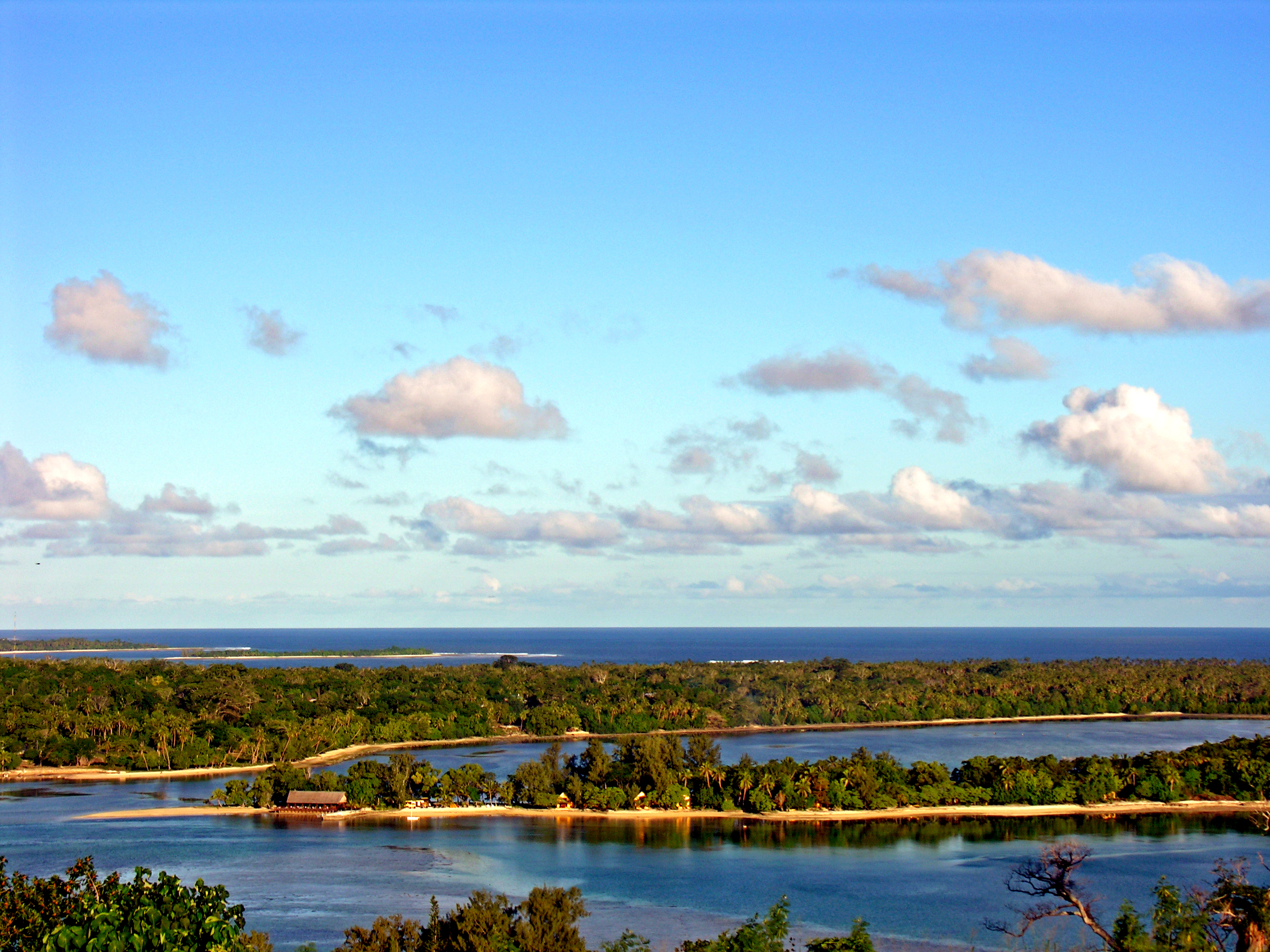
- Erakor and its peninsula seen from Panorama Crescent, Port Vila, Vanuatu, 2 June 2006
- Interactive map of Erakor

Geography
- Location: Pacific Ocean
- Coordinates: 17°46′34″S 168°18′31″E
- Archipelago: Vanuatu
- Length: 600 m (2000 ft)

Administration
- Vanuatu
- Province: Shefa Province

Erakor is a small island in the Pacific Ocean on the outskirts of Port-Vila, belonging to the Shefa Province of Vanuatu. The island is home to the Erakor Island Resort and Spa, and is a popular destination for western tourists.

== Geography ==
The island lies 5 km south of Port-Vila, a few hundred metres off the coast of Efate in the entrance of Erakor Lagoon. The island is about 600 metres in length and is very flat.

== History ==
Erakor was originally inhabited by local Ni-Vanuatu people. In the 19th century the island became the site of a Presbyterian missionary station. The foundations of the early church are still visible on the island. In 1959 the local islanders relocated to Erakor Village, located across the lagoon on Efate. The island's resort first opened in 1980.
