= Marco Rojas =

New Zealand footballer (born 1991)

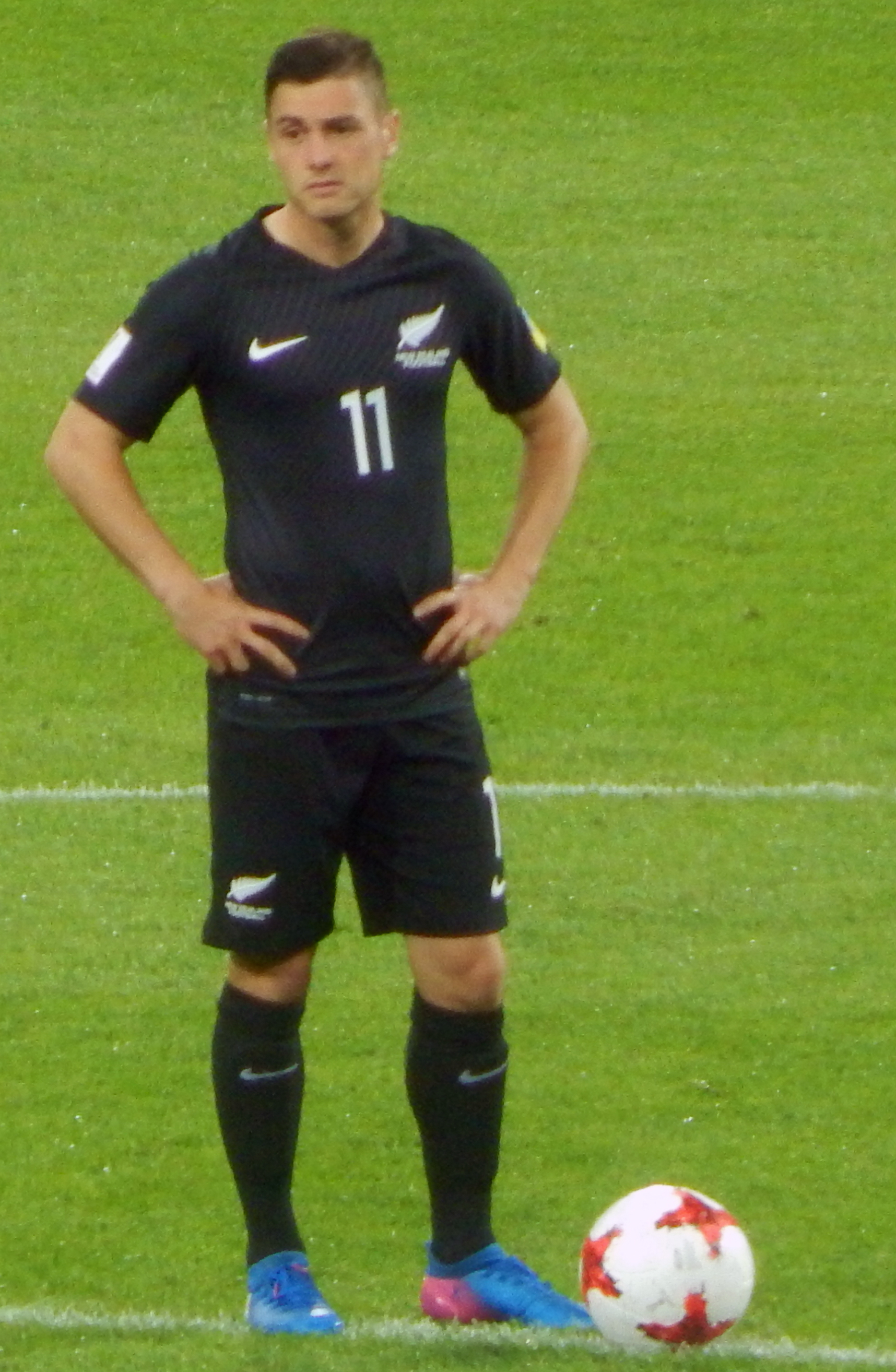
- Rojas playing for New Zealand at the 2017 FIFA Confederations Cup

Personal information
- Full name: Marco Rodrigo Rojas
- Date of birth: 5 November 1991 (age 35)
- Place of birth: Hamilton, New Zealand
- Height: 1.68 m (5 ft 6 in)
- Position: Forward

Youth career
- Hamilton Wanderers

Senior career*
Years	Team	Apps	(Gls)
2007–2008	Hamilton Wanderers	10	(2)
2008–2009	Waikato	13	(1)
2009–2011	Wellington Phoenix	20	(2)
2011–2013	Melbourne Victory	48	(15)
2013–2016	VfB Stuttgart	0	(0)
2014–2016	VfB Stuttgart II	4	(0)
2014	→ Greuther Fürth (loan)	3	(0)
2014	→ Greuther Fürth II (loan)	4	(1)
2015–2016	→ Thun (loan)	37	(4)
2016–2017	Melbourne Victory	25	(12)
2017–2019	Heerenveen	25	(4)
2019–2020	SønderjyskE	30	(3)
2020–2022	Melbourne Victory	44	(12)
2022–2023	Colo-Colo	13	(1)
2024	Brisbane Roar	8	(2)
2024–2025	Wellington Phoenix	7	(0)

International career^{‡}
2011	New Zealand U20	9	(4)
2012	New Zealand U23	6	(1)
2011–2023	New Zealand	45	(5)

Managerial career
- 2026: Eltham Redbacks (youth program coaching)
Medal record
Representing New Zealand
Men's association football
OFC Nations Cup
Third place	2012 Solomon Islands
Winner	2016 Papua New Guinea
OFC U-20 Championship
Winner	2011 New Zealand
- * Club domestic league appearances and goals as of 19 March 2025 ‡ National team caps and goals as of 24 March 2018

Marco Rodrigo Rojas (born 5 November 1991) is a former New Zealand professional footballer who played as a forward. Rojas represented the New Zealand national football team.

== Early life ==
Rojas attended Aberdeen Primary School and Maeroa Intermediate School during the late 1990s and early-mid-2000s. He is of Chilean descent.

== Club career ==
=== Wellington Phoenix ===
Marco Rojas came through Wynton Rufer's Wynrs football academy. He trialled with fellow graduate Caleb Rufer at German clubs Werder Bremen, Hannover and Borussia Mönchengladbach. Neither player was successful, but Rojas was awarded a trial with the Wellington Phoenix after winning the Retro Ricki Youth Scholarship from the supporters group Yellow Fever. Rojas impressed Wellington coach Ricki Herbert and put in some good performances in the Phoenix's warm up friendlies, resulting in him getting offered a 2-year contract with the A-League side.

On 13 September 2009, he made his senior debut in the A-League for the Wellington Phoenix against Melbourne Victory at the age of 17, coming off the bench as a 77th minute substitution for Daniel making him the second youngest player to play for the Phoenix behind Kosta Barbarouses. Rojas got his second appearance for the Phoenix when he was substituted on for Paul Ifill in the 73rd minute against Central Coast Mariners on 27 September 2009.

Rojas scored his first goal on his full debut for the Phoenix on 18 December 2010 in a 4–0 victory over the Newcastle Jets. His second goal was in the 72nd minute on 5 January against Melbourne Victory helping them secure a 2–0 win at Westpac Stadium. Rojas provided the assist for Chris Greenacre's opening goal in a 3–1 win over North Queensland Fury in the Phoenix's final home game of the 2010–11 season.

On 18 February 2011, Rojas was awarded the NAB Young Player of the Month. On 22 February 2011, he was awarded the Wellington Phoenix young player of the year.

On 27 February 2011, Wellington Phoenix announced that Rojas declined to sign a new contract with the club and wanted to move on. Following this announcement, some media outlets claimed unofficially that Rojas had signed for Melbourne Victory, however, officially, Melbourne coach Ernie Merrick denied this. It was believed at the time that Melbourne Victory, Adelaide United and a South American club were vying for the signature of the highly rated youngster.

=== Melbourne Victory ===
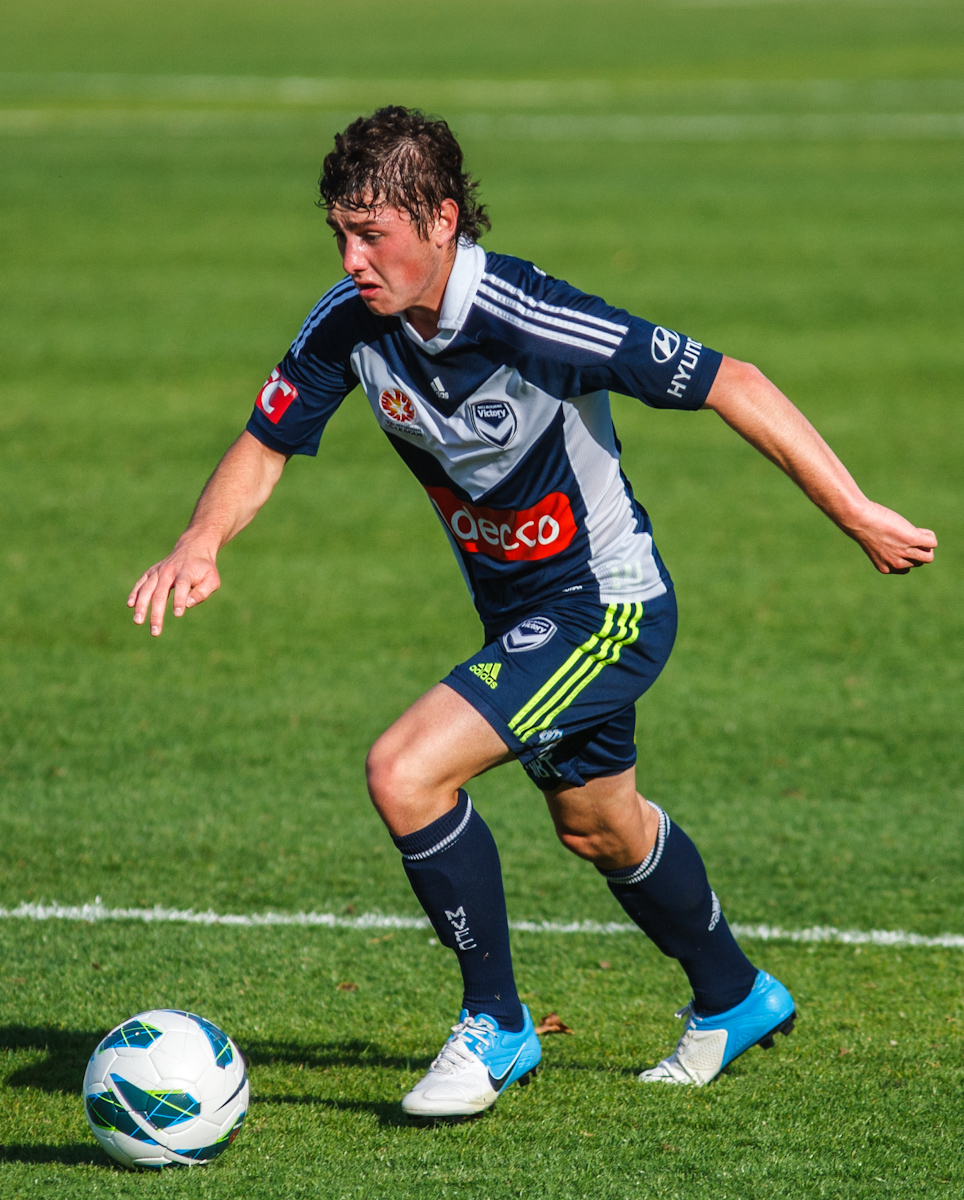
Rojas playing for the Victory in 2012

On 11 March 2011, Melbourne Victory ended weeks of speculation by officially confirming that they had indeed signed Rojas, securing him on a two-year deal.

On 8 October 2011, Rojas made his debut for Melbourne Victory FC in the A-League season opener against Sydney FC. It would not be until the following 2012–13 season, however, that he would score his first Melbourne Victory goal; it came in the Victory's 2–1 loss to crosstown rivals Melbourne Heart, after receiving a cross from Archie Thompson. His second Melbourne Victory goal came in the Victory's 2–1 win against Adelaide United two weeks later. Rojas scored goal number 15 for season 2012–13 on 31 March 2013 against Wellington Phoenix in a 2–3 win.

At the A-League end of season awards for the 2012–13 season, Rojas won both the Johnny Warren Medal and the A-League Young Footballer of the Year awards.

On 18 April 2013, Rojas quit Melbourne Victory to pursue a career in Europe. His contract with Melbourne expired on 30 April 2013.

=== VfB Stuttgart ===
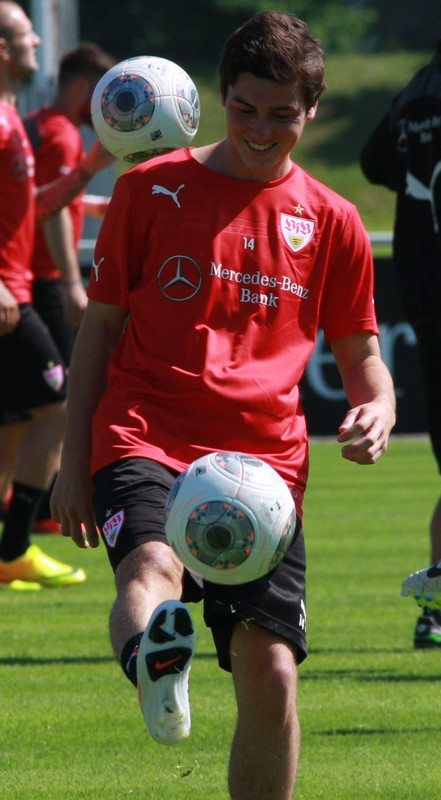
Marco Rojas training in 2014.

Rojas moved during the 2013–14 season to VfB Stuttgart. On 8 May 2013, Marco Rojas signed a contract until June 2017 with VfB Stuttgart. He joined the Bundesliga side on a free transfer from Melbourne Victory.

On 10 July 2013, Marco started his first game for Die Schwaben in a pre-season friendly match against the local Hohenlohe-Selection at the Schönebürgstadion, Crailsheim. Marco scored his first goal for his new club in this game to give VfB a 4–0 lead just before half time, VfB went on to win the match 5–0.

On 17 July 2013, Marco suffered an injury setback during training that sidelined the Kiwi international for between four and six weeks. Media sources revealed Rojas had broken a bone in his foot. Rojas however continued to swim, cycle and perform weight training but he was unable to continue football related activities until after the new 1. Bundesliga season began in early August.

==== Loan to SpVgg Greuther Fürth ====
On 21 August 2014, Rojas was loaned out to SpVgg Greuther Fürth. In January 2015 the loan deal was terminated.

==== Loan to FC Thun ====
He was loaned out to FC Thun on 3 January 2015 until the end of the 2014–15 season. On 8 February 2015, Rojas scored his first Swiss Super League goal on debut for FC Thun in Thun's 1–1 draw with FC Aarau match. On 12 June 2015, the loan deal was extended until the end of the 2015–16 season.

=== Return to Melbourne Victory ===
On 25 August 2016, Rojas returned to the A-League with former club Melbourne Victory, signing a two-year deal. His first goal on return was the sole goal for Victory in a disappointing Melbourne Derby clash. The following week, Rojas scored a match-winner at the last minute of stoppage time against Adelaide United.

=== SC Heerenveen ===
In July 2017, Rojas joined Dutch club SC Heerenveen on a two-year contract with the option of a third year.

=== SønderjyskE ===
SønderjyskE confirmed the signing of Rojas on 22 January 2019. He signed a one-year contract with an option to extend it further, and got shirt number 17. However, his contract wasn't extended and he left the club by the end of 2019.

=== Second return to Melbourne Victory ===
On 22 January 2020, Melbourne Victory announced that he had again signed for the club on a two-and-a-half-year deal.

=== Colo-Colo ===
In July 2022, Rojas moved to Chile, the native country of his father, and joined Colo-Colo on a deal for eighteen months.

=== Brisbane Roar ===
Rojas re-joined the A-League for the second half of the 2023-24 season, signing with Brisbane Roar.

== International career ==
On 8 March 2011, Rojas was called up for the 30-man squad for the upcoming games against China and Japan for New Zealand's national team the All Whites. He made his debut as a second-half substitute in the 1–1 draw with China on 25 March 2011 before he made any appearance for any other junior New Zealand sides. The scheduled match against Japan was called off due to logistics and safety concerns following the 2011 Tōhoku earthquake and tsunami. He gained his second international cap against Australia, 5 May 2011 he came on as a second-half substitute. Australia won the game 5–0

Rojas was selected for the New Zealand U-20 team to compete in the 2011 OFC U-20 Championship in April 2011 and the Suwon Cup in Korea. During the OFC U-20 championship he played in all four matches helping the Junior All Whites win the tournament and secure qualification to the 2011 FIFA U-20 World Cup.

During the junior All Whites game against Uruguay in the 2011 under-20 World Cup, Rojas contributed to the goal that put New Zealand in the lead at 54 minutes (the game finished in a 1–1 draw).

He was an unused squad player at the 2012 Summer Olympics.

== Career statistics ==
=== Club ===
As of 28 February 2025

Club	Season	League			Cup		Continental		Other		Total	
Club	Season	Division	Apps	Goals	Apps	Goals	Apps	Goals	Apps	Goals	Apps	Goals
Hamilton Wanderers	2007	NRFL Premier	10	2	–		–		–		10	2
Waikato	2008–09	Premiership	13	1	–		–		–		13	1
Wellington Phoenix	2009–10	A-League	4	0	–		–		–		4	0
Wellington Phoenix	2010–11	A-League	16	2	–		–		1 (Note: Appearances in A-League Finals)	0	17	2
Wellington Phoenix	Total		20	2	–		–		1	0	21	2
Melbourne Victory	2011–12	A-League	23	0	–		–		–		23	0
Melbourne Victory	2012–13	A-League	25	15	–		–		2	0	27	15
Melbourne Victory	Total		48	15	–		–		2	0	50	15
VfB Stuttgart II	2013–14	3. Liga	2	0	–		–		–		2	0
VfB Stuttgart II	2014–15	3. Liga	0	0	–		–		–		0	0
VfB Stuttgart II	2015–16	3. Liga	0	0	–		–		–		0	0
VfB Stuttgart II	2016–17	Regionalliga Südwest	2	0	–		–		–		2	0
VfB Stuttgart II	Total		4	0	–		–		–		4	0
Greuther Fürth (loan)	2014–15	2.Bundesliga	3	0	–		–		–		3	0
Greuther Fürth II (loan)	2014–15	Regionalliga Bayern	4	1	–		–		–		4	1
Thun (loan)	2014–15	Super League	17	2	–		–		–		17	2
Thun (loan)	2015–16	Super League	20	2	3 (Note: Appearances in Swiss Cup)	0	6 (Note: Appearances in UEFA Europa League qualifying)	1	-		29	3
Thun (loan)	Total		44	5	3	0	6	1	–		53	6
Melbourne Victory	2016–17	A-League	23	13	2 (Note: Appearances in FFA Cup)	1	–		2	–	27	14
Heerenveen	2017–18	Eredivisie	20	3	2 (Note: Appearances in KNVB Cup)	0	2	1	–		24	4
Heerenveen	2018–19	Eredivisie	3	0	2	0	–		–		5	0
Heerenveen	Total		23	3	4	0	2	1	–		29	4
SønderjyskE	2018–19	Superliga	5	0	–		2	0	4 (Note: Appearances in Superliga playoffs)	1	11	1
SønderjyskE	2019–20	Superliga	19	2	2 (Note: Appearances in Danish Cup)	1	–		–		21	3
SønderjyskE	Total		24	2	2	1	2	0	4	1	32	4
Melbourne Victory	2019–20	A-League	10	6	–		7 (Note: Appearances in AFC Champions League)	1	–		17	7
Melbourne Victory	2020–21	A-League	21	5	–		0	0	0	0	6	0
Melbourne Victory	2021–22	A-League Men	27	6	1	0	1	0	–		29	6
Melbourne Victory	Total		58	17	1	0	8	1	–		23	7
Colo-Colo	2022	Primera División	9	1	2 (Note: Appearances in Copa Chile)	0	–		–		11	1
Colo-Colo	2023	Primera División	4	0	1	0	1 (Note: Appearances in Copa Libertadores)	0	1 (Note: Appearances in Supercopa de Chile)	0	7	0
Colo-Colo	Total		13	1	3	0	1	0	1	0	18	1
Brisbane Roar	2023–24	A-League Men	8	2	–		–		–		8	2
Wellington Phoenix	2024–25	A-League Men	6	0	1	0	–		–		7	0
Career total			294	63	16	2	19	3	10	1	339	69

=== International ===
New Zealand
Year	Apps	Goals
2011	2	0
2012	11	1
2013	3	0
2014	3	0
2015	3	0
2016	7	3
2017	10	1
2018	1	0
2019	1	0
2022	1	0
2023	3	0
Total	45	5

==== International goals ====
List of international goals scored by Marco Rojas
No.	Date	Venue	Opponent	Score	Result	Competition
1.	11 September 2012	North Harbour Stadium, Auckland, New Zealand	Solomon Islands	6–1	6–1	2014 FIFA World Cup qualification
2.	7 October 2016	Nissan Stadium, Nashville, United States	Mexico	1–1	1–2	Friendly
3.	12 November 2016	QBE Stadium, Albany, New Zealand	New Caledonia	1–0	2–0	2018 FIFA World Cup qualification
4.	12 November 2016	QBE Stadium, Albany, New Zealand	New Caledonia	2–0	2–0	2018 FIFA World Cup qualification
5.	25 March 2017	Churchill Park, Lautoka, Fiji	Fiji	2–0	2–0	2018 FIFA World Cup qualification

== Honours ==
Melbourne Victory

- FFA Cup: 2021

Colo-Colo

- Primera División de Chile: 2022
- Copa Chile: 2023

New Zealand

- OFC Nations Cup: 2016
- OFC U-20 Championship: 2011

Individual

- Oceania Footballer of the Year: 2012
- Johnny Warren Medal: 2012–13
- A-League Young Footballer of the Year: 2012–13
- A-League PFA Team of the Season : 2012–13
- IFFHS OFC Men's Team of the Decade 2011–2020
- IFFHS Oceania Men's Team of All Time: 2021
