= Jean Kaltak =

Vanuatuan footballer

Personal information
- Date of birth: 19 August 1994 (age 32)
- Place of birth: Vanuatu
- Position: Forward

Team information
- Current team: Ifira Black Bird

Youth career
- –2009: Teouma Academy

Senior career*
Years	Team	Apps	(Gls)
2009–2011	Teouma Academy		
2011	Hekari United		
2012–2013	Erakor Golden Star		
2013–2014	Hekari United		
2014–2015	Erakor Golden Star		
2015	Tafea		
2015	Dragon		
2016–2018	Erakor Golden Star		
2018–	Ifira Black Bird		

International career
2009–2011	Vanuatu U17	8	(5)
2011–2023	Vanuatu U20	9	(9)
2012–2015	Vanuatu U23	13	(21)
2011–	Vanuatu	11	(10)
Medal record
Men's football
Representing Vanuatu
OFC U-20 Championship
Third place	2011 New Zealand
Third place	2013 Fiji
- * Club domestic league appearances and goals

Jean Kaltak (born 19 August 1994) is a Ni-Vanuatu international footballer who plays as forward for Vanuatu club Ifira Black Bird and the Vanuatu national team.

== Club career ==
Kaltak, formerly a youth player with the Teouma Academy, also started his senior career with the team, as they were elected to play in the Vanuatu Premia Divisen starting in the 2009–10 season. He played for them until 2011 before signing for Papua New Guinean side, Hekari United in September 2011.

== International career ==
Kaltak initially played with Vanuatu's U-17 squad at the 2009 OFC U-17 Championship where Vanuatu finished fourth out of four teams. He continued with the team at the 2011 edition, scoring five goals as they again finished fourth. Three months later, he debuted with Vanuatu's U-20 squad at the 2011 OFC U-20 Championship where he received the Golden Boot with six goals as Vanuatu finished third. His performances for the youth teams eventually got him a call-up into Vanuatu's senior team for a pair of friendly matches against the Solomon Islands towards the end of July 2011. He featured in both matches as a starter as they drew one and won one. He also scored 16 goals in 2015 Pacific Games against Federated States of Micronesia national under-23 football team.

== Personal life ==
Kaltak's brothers, Tony and Kalfter, and cousin Brian are also footballers. His father, Ivoky, is a former Vanuatu international footballer who also played as a striker.

== Career statistics ==
=== International ===
Appearances and goals by national team and year
National team	Year	Apps	Goals
Vanuatu	2011	7	9
Vanuatu	2012	1	0
Vanuatu	2024	3	2
Total		11	10

Scores and results list Vanuatu's goal tally first, score column indicates score after each Kaltak goal.

List of international goals scored by Jean Kaltak
No.	Date	Venue	Opponent	Score	Result	Competition	Ref.
1	30 August 2011	Stade Rivière Salée, Nouméa, New Caledonia	Tuvalu	1–0	5–1	2011 Pacific Games	
2	30 August 2011	Stade Rivière Salée, Nouméa, New Caledonia	Tuvalu	2–0	5–1	2011 Pacific Games	
3	30 August 2011	Stade Rivière Salée, Nouméa, New Caledonia	Tuvalu	3–0	5–1	2011 Pacific Games	
4	30 August 2011	Stade Rivière Salée, Nouméa, New Caledonia	Tuvalu	5–0	5–1	2011 Pacific Games	
5	1 September 2011	Stade Rivière Salée, Nouméa, New Caledonia	Solomon Islands	1–0	1–0	2011 Pacific Games	
6	3 September 2011	Stade Rivière Salée, Nouméa, New Caledonia	Guam	3–1	4–1	2011 Pacific Games	
7	5 September 2011	Stade Rivière Salée, Nouméa, New Caledonia	American Samoa	4–0	8–0	2011 Pacific Games	
8	5 September 2011	Stade Rivière Salée, Nouméa, New Caledonia	American Samoa	6–0	8–0	2011 Pacific Games	
9	5 September 2011	Stade Rivière Salée, Nouméa, New Caledonia	American Samoa	8–0	8–0	2011 Pacific Games	
10	21 December 2024	Lawson Tama Stadium, Honiara, Solomon Islands	Papua New Guinea	1–2	1–2	2024 MSG Prime Minister's Cup	

== Honours ==
Vanuatu U20

- OFC U-20 Championship: 3rd place, 2011, 2013
