= Dakota Lucas =

New Zealand footballer

Personal information
- Full name: Dakota William Nicholas Lucas
- Date of birth: 26 July 1991 (age 35)
- Place of birth: Hastings, New Zealand
- Height: 1.70 m (5 ft 7 in)
- Positions: Winger; second striker

Senior career*
Years	Team	Apps	(Gls)
2009–2011	Waitakere United		
2011–2012	Team Wellington	13	(4)
2012	Sunshine Coast	12	(7)
2012–2014	Hawke's Bay United	0	(0)
2013	→ Hume City FC (loan)	2	(0)
2015	Manningham United FC	6	(0)

International career^{‡}
2011	New Zealand U20	10	(5)
2012–	New Zealand U23	5	(1)
- * Club domestic league appearances and goals as of 11 October 2013 ‡ National team caps and goals as of 15:31, 5 August 2012 (UTC)

Dakota William Nicholas Lucas (born 26 July 1991) is a New Zealand football player who last played for Manningham United FC in the Victorian State League Division 1 in 2015.

In June 2012 Lucas was named in the New Zealand football team to compete in the Men's Olympic Football Tournament. Dakota scored his first goal for the NZ Under 23's in an Olympic warmup match versus Japan, slotting in a 90-minute equaliser meaning the game finished 1–1.

Lucas made one appearance at the 2012 London Olympics playing in New Zealand's third and last match, a 3–0 defeat by Brazil.

Lucas moved to Manningham United FC in 2015 and made a total of 6 senior appearances failing to score a goal.
