= Cory Chettleburgh =

New Zealand footballer

Personal information
- Date of birth: 21 August 1991 (age 35)
- Place of birth: New Zealand
- Position: Midfielder

Senior career*
Years	Team	Apps	(Gls)
- Palmerston North Marist FC
- Western Suburbs
2008–2010	YoungHeart Manawatu		(2)
2010	Sparta Rotterdam	1	(0)
2011–2012	YoungHeart Manawatu	6	(0)
2012	WHC Wezep		
2012–2015	Team Wellington	39	(4)
2015–2017	Hawke's Bay United FC	23	(3)
2017–2018	Tasman United	10	(0)
2018	Lautoka F.C.		
2016–	Wairarapa United		

International career
- New Zealand U17
- * Club domestic league appearances and goals

Cory Chettleburgh (born 21 August 1991 in New Zealand) is a New Zealand footballer who plays for Wairarapa United.

== Career ==
=== England ===
Trailed with Ipswich Town in 2008 as a high schooler.

=== Netherlands ===
Landing a deal with Sparta Rotterdam of the Dutch Eerste Divisie in August 2010, Chettleburgh cut ties with De Kasteelheren that December, but still trained with them for some time after due to not finding a club before joining WHC Wezep in 2012.

=== Fiji ===
Cleared to don the Lautoka colours in 2018, the New Zealander contributed his first goal for the Blues in a 3-1 success over Madang at the 2018 OFC Champions League group stage.

=== Conduct ===
Over the course of his career, he has committed a series misdemeanors during games, verbally abusing the assistant referee in 2010, and doing the same in 2016 twice, earning him seven-game and four-game suspensions.

== Personal life ==
Owns a British passport through his English mother.
