= Himson Teleda =

Solomon Islands footballer

Personal information
- Full name: Himson Teleda
- Date of birth: 28 August 1992 (age 34)
- Place of birth: Solomon Islands
- Position: Midfielder

Team information
- Current team: Western United
- Number: 7

Senior career*
Years	Team	Apps	(Gls)
2010–	Western United		(7)

International career^{‡}
2011–	Solomon Islands U-19	4	(4)
2012–	Solomon Islands U-23	1	(1)
2012–	Solomon Islands	4	(2)
- * Club domestic league appearances and goals as of 11 September 2012 ‡ National team caps and goals as of 11 September 2012

Himson Teleda (born 28 August 1992) is a footballer that comes from Solomon Islands. He plays as a midfielder for Western United in Solomon Islands National Club Championship. He is a member of Solomon Islands national football team. He made his debut during the 2012 OFC Nations Cup and he scored one goal against New Zealand. In stage 3 he scored one goal against Tahiti.
