= Football at the 2007 South Pacific Games – Men's team squads =

The 2007 Pacific Games football tournament was an international football tournament held in Samoa from 25 August until 7 September 2007. The 10 national teams involved in the tournament were required to register a squad of players; only players in these squads were eligible to take part in the tournament.

Players marked (c) were named as captain for their national squad. Players' club teams and players' age as of 25 August 2007 – the tournament's opening day.

== Group A ==
=== Cook Islands ===
Coach: (Australia) Tim Jerks

No.	Pos.	Player	Date of birth (age)	Caps	Club
1	GK	Tony Jamieson	16 March 1974 (aged 33)		(New Zealand) Wellington Olympic
2	DF	Paul van Eijk	16 March 1986 (aged 21)		(Cook Islands) Nikao Sokattak
3	DF	Edward Brogan	15 July 1985 (aged 22)		(Cook Islands) Tupapa Maraerenga
4	DF	John Pareanga	22 October 1980 (aged 26)		(Cook Islands) Matavera FC
5	DF	Joseph Miitamariki	14 August 1988 (aged 19)		(Cook Islands) Tupapa Maraerenga
6	MF	Stephen Willis	12 December 1986 (aged 20)		(Cook Islands) Nikao Sokattak
7	MF	Adrian Shepherd	1 June 1986 (aged 21)		(New Zealand) Waitakere City
8	MF	Thomas Le Mouton	10 July 1985 (aged 22)		(New Zealand) Albany United
9	FW	Kunda Tom	14 July 1986 (aged 21)		(Cook Islands) Nikao Sokattak
10	FW	Eugene Tatuava	18 September 1984 (aged 22)		(Cook Islands) Tupapa Maraerenga
11	MF	Edward Drollett	7 June 1975 (aged 32)		(Cook Islands) Tupapa Maraerenga
12	FW	Ano Tisam	25 April 1982 (aged 25)		(Cook Islands) Nikao Sokattak
13	MF	Teariki Mateariki	12 May 1984 (aged 23)		(Cook Islands) Nikao Sokattak
14	MF	John Quijano	2 September 1990 (aged 16)		(Cook Islands) Nikao Sokattak
15	MF	Paavo Mustonen	10 November 1989 (aged 17)		(Cook Islands) Nikao Sokattak
16	MF	Daniel Shepherd	23 September 1974 (aged 32)		(New Zealand) Waitakere City
17	DF	Augusty Bartillard	13 April 1986 (aged 21)		(Cook Islands) Puaikura FC
18	DF	Nathan Tisam	6 July 1988 (aged 19)		(Cook Islands) Nikao Sokattak
20	GK	Remi Wearing	27 May 1985 (aged 22)		(Cook Islands)
21	DF	Jimmy Katoa	26 April 1980 (aged 27)		(Cook Islands) Avatiu FC

=== Fiji ===
Coach: (Uruguay) Juan Carlos Buzzetti

No.	Pos.	Player	Date of birth (age)	Caps	Club
1	GK	Simione Tamanisau	5 June 1982 (aged 25)		(Fiji) Rewa FC
2	MF	Alvin Avinesh	6 April 1982 (aged 25)		(Fiji) Lautoka FC
3	DF	Waisake Sabutu	20 January 1987 (aged 20)		(Fiji) Rewa FC
4	DF	Samuela Vula	22 August 1984 (aged 23)		(Fiji) Rewa FC
5	DF	Ronil Kumar	29 November 1984 (aged 22)		(New Zealand) Waitakere City
6	DF	Lorima Dau	29 July 1983 (aged 24)		(Fiji) Rewa FC
7	DF	Ratu Vatucicila	25 June 1978 (aged 29)		(Fiji) Suva FC
8	MF	Pita Bolatoga	30 November 1984 (aged 22)		(Fiji) Ba FC
9	FW	Josaia Bukalidi	27 May 1981 (aged 26)		(Fiji) Ba FC
10	FW	Osea Vakatalesau	15 January 1986 (aged 21)		(Fiji) Ba FC
11	MF	Thomas Vulivuli	24 May 1981 (aged 26)		(Fiji) Labasa FC
12	DF	Peni Finau	5 August 1981 (aged 26)		(New Zealand) YoungHeart Manawatu
13	DF	Taniela Waqa	22 June 1983 (aged 24)		(Fiji) Lautoka FC
14	DF	Viliame Toma	22 January 1979 (aged 28)		(Fiji) Nadi FC
15	MF	Salesh Kumar	28 July 1981 (aged 26)		(New Zealand) Central United
16	MF	Malakai Tiwa	3 October 1986 (aged 20)		(Fiji) Ba FC
17	DF	Malakai Kainihewe	28 July 1977 (aged 30)		(Fiji) Ba FC
18	FW	Pita Rabo	30 July 1977 (aged 30)		(New Zealand) Wairarapa United
19	FW	Roy Krishna	30 August 1987 (aged 19)		(Fiji) Labasa FC
20	GK	Beniamino Mateinaqara	19 August 1987 (aged 20)		(Fiji) Nadi FC
21	DF	Ratu Vatucicila	25 June 1978 (aged 29)		(Fiji) Suva FC

=== New Caledonia ===
Coach: (France) Didier Chambaron

No.	Pos.	Player	Date of birth (age)	Caps	Club
1	GK	Marc Ounemoa	27 January 1973 (aged 34)		(New Caledonia) JS Baco
2	DF	André Naxue	29 March 1986 (aged 21)		(New Caledonia) AS Lössi
3	DF	Wilson Forest	16 September 1987 (aged 19)		(New Caledonia) AS Lössi
4	DF	André Sinédo	26 February 1978 (aged 29)		(New Caledonia) AS Magenta
5	DF	Robert Wayaridri	22 March 1971 (aged 36)		(New Caledonia) JS Baco
6	DF	Georges Wadrenges	1 April 1979 (aged 28)		(New Caledonia) AS Mont-Dore
7	DF	Yohann Mercier	15 December 1980 (aged 26)		(New Caledonia) ACB Poya
8	MF	Jean-Chrys Xenie	13 March 1987 (aged 20)		(New Caledonia) USC Nouméa
9	MF	Marius Mapou	22 June 1980 (aged 27)		(New Caledonia) AS Mont-Dore
10	MF	Pierre Wajoka	19 December 1978 (aged 28)		(New Caledonia) AS Magenta
11	FW	Luther Wahnyamalla	27 February 1984 (aged 23)		(New Caledonia) AS Lössi
12	FW	Jean-Louis Toto	18 June 1985 (aged 22)		(New Caledonia) USJ Wedrumel
13	FW	José Hmaé	5 March 1978 (aged 29)		(New Caledonia) AS Pirae
14	MF	Patrick Diaiké	25 May 1980 (aged 27)		(New Caledonia) AS Mont-Dore
15	DF	Jean-Patrick Wakanumuné	13 March 1980 (aged 27)		(New Caledonia) AS Mont-Dore
16	DF	Adolphe Boaoutho	9 February 1986 (aged 21)		(New Caledonia) AS Témala Ouélisse
17	FW	Iamel Kabeu	7 September 1982 (aged 24)		(New Caledonia) JS Baco
18	MF	Poulidor Toto	16 May 1983 (aged 24)		(New Caledonia) USJ Wedrumel
19	MF	Patrick Drawilo	8 September 1983 (aged 23)		(New Caledonia) AS Lössi
20	GK	Jean-Yann Dounezeck	26 January 1981 (aged 26)		(New Caledonia) AS Magenta

=== Tahiti ===
Coach: Gérard Kautai

No.	Pos.	Player	Date of birth (age)	Caps	Club
1	GK	Jonathan Torohia	22 January 1985 (aged 22)		(French Polynesia) AS Pirae
2	DF	Teraimaru Mervin	12 July 1984 (aged 23)		(French Polynesia) AS Jeunes Tahitiens
3	DF	Jean-Yves Li Waut	2 July 1978 (aged 29)		(French Polynesia) AS Manu-Ura
4	DF	Freddy Tauimara	16 May 1983 (aged 24)		(French Polynesia) AS Manu-Ura
5	DF	Stéphane Gelima	10 April 1987 (aged 20)		(French Polynesia) AS Dragon
6	MF	Samuel Garcia	2 October 1975 (aged 31)		(French Polynesia) AS Vénus
7	MF	Billy Mataitai	20 July 1983 (aged 24)		(French Polynesia) AS Manu-Ura
8	MF	Jérôme Tetavahi	11 January 1984 (aged 23)		(French Polynesia) AS Pirae
9	FW	Raimana Li Fung Kuee	10 April 1985 (aged 22)		(French Polynesia) AS Dragon
10	FW	Raimoana Bennett	15 February 1980 (aged 27)		(French Polynesia) AS Dragon
11	MF	Auguste Washetine	8 November 1979 (aged 27)		(French Polynesia) AS Manu-Ura
12	DF	Hiro Poroiae	14 June 1986 (aged 21)		(French Polynesia) AS Manu-Ura
13	FW	Temarii Tinorua	19 May 1986 (aged 21)		(French Polynesia) AS Tefana
14	FW	Taufa Neuffer	30 August 1978 (aged 28)		(French Polynesia) AS Tefana
15	MF	Farahia Teuiria	29 August 1972 (aged 34)		(French Polynesia) AS Tiare
18	MF	Axel Williams	3 December 1983 (aged 23)		(French Polynesia) AS Pirae
19	DF	Axel Temataua	29 August 1980 (aged 26)		(French Polynesia) AS Manu-Ura
20	MF	Teva Zaveroni	10 October 1975 (aged 31)		(French Polynesia) AS Taravao
21	DF	Angelo Tchen	8 March 1982 (aged 25)		(French Polynesia) AS Tefana
22	GK	Daniel Tapeta	25 October 1974 (aged 32)		(French Polynesia) AS Manu-Ura
23	GK	Xavier Samin	1 January 1978 (aged 29)		(French Polynesia) AS Tefana

=== Tuvalu ===
Coach: Toakai Puapua

No.	Pos.	Player	Date of birth (age)	Caps	Club
1	GK	Moresi Valoaga	10 February 1984 (aged 23)		(Tuvalu) Tamanuku
2	DF	Polu Tanei	Unknown		(Tuvalu) Tofaga
3	DF	Onusemou Neemia	17 March 1981 (aged 26)		(Tuvalu) Nauti
4	DF	Mau Penisula	15 May 1979 (aged 28)		(Tuvalu) Tofaga
5	MF	Lalesi Vaia	Unknown		(Tuvalu) Nauti
6	FW	Paitela Kelemene	14 January 1987 (aged 20)		(Tuvalu) Tofaga
7	DF	Papua Ulisese	Unknown		(Tuvalu) Nui
8	MF	Petio Semaia	23 February 1979 (aged 28)		(Tuvalu) Lakena United
9	MF	Mati Fusi	16 June 1981 (aged 26)		(Tuvalu) Tofaga
10	DF	Semese Alefaio	17 March 1974 (aged 33)		(Tuvalu) Nauti
11	FW	Paeniu Fagota	26 August 1978 (aged 28)		(Tuvalu) Lakena United
12	MF	Loisio Peni	3 November 1978 (aged 28)		(Tuvalu) Tofaga
13	MF	Fulisagafou Hauma	Unknown		(Tuvalu) Nanumaga
14	DF	Peniuna Kaitu	31 January 1980 (aged 27)		(Tuvalu) Nauti
15	MF	Jelly Selau	23 July 1983 (aged 24)		(Tuvalu) Manu Laeva
16	FW	Imo Fiamalua	17 September 1986 (aged 20)		(Tuvalu) Nanumaga
17	DF	Hetoa Taula	Unknown		(Tuvalu) Nauti
19	GK	Jay Timo	16 October 1982 (aged 24)		(Tuvalu) Nauti
20	MF	Viliamu Sekifu	14 January 1982 (aged 25)		(Tuvalu) Manu Laeva
22	MF	Pelesia Teisini	Unknown		(Tuvalu) Tamanuku

== Group B ==
=== American Samoa ===
Coach: (England) David Brand

No.	Pos.	Player	Date of birth (age)	Caps	Club
1	GK	Nicky Salapu	18 August 1979 (aged 28)		(American Samoa) PanSa East
2	DF	Terrence Sinapati	15 December 1980 (aged 26)		(American Samoa) PanSa East
3	DF	Travis Sinapati	21 September 1982 (aged 24)		(American Samoa) PanSa East
4	DF	Pesamino Victor	4 September 1986 (aged 20)		(American Samoa) PanSa East
5	DF	Alexander Victor	1 October 1983 (aged 23)		(American Samoa) PanSa East
6	MF	Tuaoloina Solofa	25 July 1982 (aged 25)		(American Samoa)
7	MF	Thomas Leota	3 May 1988 (aged 19)		(American Samoa)
8	MF	Natia Natia	2 March 1985 (aged 22)		(American Samoa) Lion Heart
9	FW	Ieti Taulealo	23 April 1986 (aged 21)		(American Samoa)
10	MF	Kitiona Faatamala Jr.	30 December 1984 (aged 22)		(American Samoa) Lion Heart
11	DF	Maika Molesi	10 October 1985 (aged 21)		(American Samoa) Konica Machine
12	MF	Hansel Maiava	15 August 1989 (aged 18)		(American Samoa) PanSa East
13	DF	Johnny Saelua	19 July 1988 (aged 19)		(American Samoa) Konica Machine
14	MF	Tafuna Toilolo	7 November 1988 (aged 18)		(American Samoa)
15	DF	Uasi Heleta	21 January 1986 (aged 21)		(American Samoa) Pago Youth
16	MF	Liatama Amisone	Unknown		(American Samoa) Pago Youth
17	MF	Alo Vakatau	2 April 1981 (aged 26)		(American Samoa)
18	MF	Frankie Silao	28 May 1980 (aged 27)		(American Samoa)
19	FW	Ramin Ott	22 June 1986 (aged 21)		(American Samoa) Konica Machine
20	MF	Sue Tonise	10 May 1977 (aged 30)		(American Samoa)

=== Samoa ===
Coach: Falevi Umutaua

No.	Pos.	Player	Date of birth (age)	Caps	Club
1	GK	Pasi Schwalger	16 October 1982 (aged 24)		(Australia) Heidelberg United
2	DF	Voa Sauaga	28 September 1978 (aged 28)		(New Zealand) Otahuhu United
3	DF	Damien Fonoti	4 December 1987 (aged 19)		(New Zealand) Waitakere City
4	MF	Chris Cahill	25 December 1984 (aged 22)		(Australia) Dulwich Hill
5	DF	Jarrell Sale	16 August 1984 (aged 23)		(Samoa) Cruz Azul
6	MF	Fauivi Ugapo	23 May 1986 (aged 21)		(Samoa) Goldstar Sogi
8	MF	Joseph Hoeflich	3 May 1988 (aged 19)		(Samoa) Kiwi FC
9	FW	Max Hoeflich	22 December 1986 (aged 20)		(Samoa) Kiwi FC
10	FW	Desmond Fa'aiuaso	24 February 1984 (aged 23)		(Samoa) Strickland Brothers Lepea
11	FW	Junior Michael	15 April 1971 (aged 36)		(Samoa) Cruz Azul
12	DF	Filipo Bureta	5 March 1983 (aged 24)		(Samoa) Titavi FC
13	MF	Lionel Taylor	22 January 1984 (aged 23)		(Samoa) Kiwi FC
14	MF	Bevan Kapisi	15 August 1981 (aged 26)		(New Zealand) Otahuhu United
15	DF	Edwin Tyrell	30 June 1977 (aged 30)		(Samoa) Goldstar Sogi
16	MF	Penitito Tumua	12 December 1983 (aged 23)		(Samoa) Cruz Azul
17	GK	Horst Petana	14 May 1982 (aged 25)		(Samoa) Vaivase-Tai
18	DF	Sakaria Fuimaono	1 February 1984 (aged 23)		(Samoa) Lepea FC
19	DF	Sapati Umutaua	3 November 1986 (aged 20)		(Samoa) Kiwi FC
20	GK	Filipo Uli	15 July 1982 (aged 25)		(Samoa) Vaivase-Tai
21	MF	Keith Stanfield	30 September 1983 (aged 23)		(England)

=== Solomon Islands ===
Coach: (Brazil) Ayrton Andrioli

No.	Pos.	Player	Date of birth (age)	Caps	Club
1	GK	Fred Hale	17 July 1979 (aged 28)		(Solomon Islands) Koloale
2	DF	David Taro Jr.	6 July 1984 (aged 23)		(Solomon Islands) Honiara Rangers
3	DF	Mahlon Houkarawa	23 April 1976 (aged 31)		(Solomon Islands) Koloale
4	DF	Samson Takayama	19 February 1979 (aged 28)		(Solomon Islands) Kossa
5	DF	George Suri	16 July 1982 (aged 25)		(New Zealand) Auckland City
6	DF	Tome Faisi	21 January 1982 (aged 25)		(Solomon Islands) Marist
7	MF	Alick Maemae	10 December 1985 (aged 21)		(New Zealand) YoungHeart Manawatu
8	DF	Jacob Pekau	12 October 1976 (aged 30)		(Papua New Guinea) Hekari United
9	FW	Godwin Bebeu	13 January 1984 (aged 23)		(New Zealand) Waikato
10	MF	Judd Molea	23 August 1988 (aged 19)		(Australia) Queensland Academy of Sport
11	FW	Commins Menapi	18 September 1977 (aged 29)		(New Zealand) Waitakere United
12	MF	James Naka	9 October 1984 (aged 22)		(Solomon Islands) Kossa
13	MF	George Lui	21 December 1981 (aged 25)		(Solomon Islands) Makuru
14	FW	Benjamin Totori	20 February 1986 (aged 21)		(New Zealand) Waitakere United
15	MF	Mostyn Beui	21 January 1980 (aged 27)		(Solomon Islands) Marist
16	MF	Stanley Waita	10 October 1979 (aged 27)		(New Zealand) Waikato
17	DF	Gideon Omokirio	12 October 1976 (aged 30)		(Solomon Islands) Kossa
18	MF	Henry Fa'arodo	5 October 1982 (aged 24)		(New Zealand) Auckland City
19	MF	George Aba	4 March 1984 (aged 23)		(Solomon Islands) Makuru
20	GK	John Morgan	3 January 1986 (aged 21)		(Solomon Islands) Kossa
21	DF	Arnold Keni	10 January 1986 (aged 21)		(Solomon Islands) Marist

=== Tonga ===
Coach: (England) Jacob Swanson

No.	Pos.	Player	Date of birth (age)	Caps	Club
1	GK	Kavakava Manumu'a	30 October 1982 (aged 24)		(Tonga) SC Lotohaʻapai
2	DF	Sione Uhatahi	15 September 1988 (aged 18)		(Tonga) SC Lotohaʻapai
3	DF	Kava Huihahau	8 August 1982 (aged 25)		(New Zealand) Mangere United
4	DF	Folio Moeaki	9 May 1982 (aged 25)		(Tonga) Veitongo
5	DF	Matana Paongo	9 March 1989 (aged 18)		(Tonga) SC Lotohaʻapai
6	MF	Pio Palu	21 March 1986 (aged 21)		(Tonga) Navutoka
7	MF	Sione Vea Tahitua	4 December 1980 (aged 26)		(Tonga) SC Lotoha'apai
8	MF	Kamaliele Papani	8 April 1984 (aged 23)		(Tonga) SC Lotoha'apai
9	FW	Ilalio Leakona	14 January 1981 (aged 26)		(Tonga) SC Lotoha'apai
10	FW	Unaloto Feao	16 January 1982 (aged 25)		(Tonga) Navutoka
11	FW	Malakai Savieti	11 November 1989 (aged 17)		(Tonga)
12	MF	Lafaele Moala	22 July 1982 (aged 25)		(Tonga) SC Lotohaʻapai
13	MF	Mark Uhatahi	24 March 1983 (aged 24)		(Tonga) SC Lotohaʻapai
14	MF	Kaisani Uhatahi	22 April 1975 (aged 32)		(Tonga) SC Lotohaʻapai
15	MF	Tevita Takai	10 May 1981 (aged 26)		(Tonga)
16	MF	Sione Tovo	6 April 1986 (aged 21)		(Tonga) Navutoka
17	DF	Semisi Tu'ifangaloka	29 May 1981 (aged 26)		(Tonga)
18	DF	Kaliopasi Uele	7 August 1979 (aged 28)		(Tonga)
19	DF	Lisaniasi Kainga	6 February 1984 (aged 23)		(Tonga)
20	GK	Kaneti Falela	1 July 1989 (aged 18)		(Tonga)
21	GK	Kinikini Kau	2 April 1982 (aged 25)		(Tonga)

=== Vanuatu ===
Coach: Robert Calvo

No.	Pos.	Player	Date of birth (age)	Caps	Club
1	GK	David Chilia	10 June 1978 (aged 29)		(Vanuatu) Tafea FC
2	DF	Samson Obed	1 October 1981 (aged 25)		(Vanuatu) Tafea FC
3	DF	Ken Masauvakalo	20 November 1984 (aged 22)		(Vanuatu) Erakor Golden Star
4	DF	Rexley Tarivuti	1 December 1985 (aged 21)		(Vanuatu) Yatel FC
5	DF	Andrew Chichirua	12 May 1986 (aged 21)		(Vanuatu) Port Vila Sharks
6	MF	Fedy Vava	25 November 1982 (aged 24)		(Vanuatu) Tafea FC
7	MF	Moise Poida	2 April 1978 (aged 29)		(Vanuatu) Tafea FC
8	MF	Tom Tomake	23 September 1982 (aged 24)		(Vanuatu) Amicale FC
9	FW	Jean Nako Naprapol	20 July 1980 (aged 27)		(Vanuatu) Tafea FC
10	MF	Seule Soromon	14 August 1984 (aged 23)		(Fiji) Suva FC
11	FW	Etienne Mermer	26 January 1977 (aged 30)		(Vanuatu) Tafea FC
12	DF	Fenedy Masauvakalo	4 November 1984 (aged 22)		(Australia) Mitchelton FC
13	FW	François Sakama	12 December 1987 (aged 19)		(Vanuatu) Tafea FC
14	MF	Pita David Maki	12 October 1982 (aged 24)		(Vanuatu) Tafea FC
15	FW	Jean Maleb	7 July 1986 (aged 21)		(Vanuatu) Yatel FC
16	FW	Richard Iwai	15 March 1979 (aged 28)		(Vanuatu) Tafea FC
17	DF	Geoffrey Gete	3 August 1986 (aged 21)		(Vanuatu) Tafea FC
18	DF	Jacques Mafil Nawan	3 May 1983 (aged 24)		(Vanuatu) Tafea FC
19	MF	Derek Malas	10 December 1983 (aged 23)		(Vanuatu) Erakor Golden Star
20	GK	Chikau Mansale	13 January 1983 (aged 24)		(Vanuatu) Tupuji Imere
21	DF	Gérard Maki Haitong	6 July 1978 (aged 29)		(Vanuatu) Amicale FC
