= Fiji national football team results (2000–present) =

The Fiji national football team represents Fiji in association football and is controlled by the Fiji Football Association (Fiji FA), the governing body of the sport in the country. Before joining Fédération Internationale de Football Association (FIFA) and the Oceania Football Confederation (OFC), it played its first match in October 1951 – a 6–4 friendly loss to New Zealand.

Since 2000, Fiji have played a total of 134 matches, won 63, drawn 28 and lost 43, scoring 316 goals and conceding 167. It has competed in the Pacifc Games, the OFC Men's Nations Cup, the Melanesia Cup – and its successsor the MSG Prime Minister's Cup – and the qualification rounds for the FIFA World Cup.

Fiji recorded its best finish in the OFC Men's Nations Cup in 2008. Played in a home-and-away format, Fiji finished third for only the second time in the competition. In 2003, the country hosted the South Pacific Games. The national team went unbeaten through the group stage of the football tournament before defeating Tahiti in the semi-finals. Cousins Manoa and Esala Masi both scored in the final as Fiji defeated New Caledonia 2–0 to win the gold medal. Fiji also won the final Melanesia Cup in 2000 and came out on top in the final of the 2026 MSG Prime Minister's Cup.

Roy Krishna is Fiji's top goalscorer and most capped player. After competing for Fiji during the 2026 MSG Prime Minister's Cup in September 2026, Krishna has scored a total of 47 goals in 68 caps since his debut in 2007.

== Key ==
Key to matches

- Att. = Match attendance
- (H) = Home ground
- (A) = Away ground
- (N) = Neutral ground

Key to record by opponent

- Pld = Games played
- W = Games won
- D = Games drawn
- L = Games lost
- GF = Goals for
- GA = Goals against

== Results ==
Fiji's score is shown first in each case.

No.	Date	Venue	Opponents	Score	Competition	Fiji scorers	Att.	Ref.
158	8 April 2000	Suva (N)	Papua New Guinea	5–0	2000 Melanesia Cup	M. Masi, Namaqa, E. Masi, Baleinuku, K. Doidoi	—	
159	10 April 2000	Suva (N)	New Caledonia	2–1	2000 Melanesia Cup	M. Masi, A. Driu	—	
160	11 April 2000	Suva (N)	Vanuatu	4–1	2000 Melanesia Cup	E. Masi (2), B. Lorima (2)	—	
161	15 April 2000	Suva (N)	Solomon Islands	2–2	2000 Melanesia Cup	Baleinuku, A. Driu	—	
162	5 February 2001	Lautoka (H)	Malaysia	4–1	Friendly	Samy (3), Malik (o.g.)	—	
163	7 February 2001	Suva (H)	Malaysia	2–0	Friendly	Unknown	—	
164	9 February 2001	Ba (H)	Malaysia	1–2	Friendly	E. Masi	—	
165	7 April 2001	International Sports Stadium, Coffs Harbour (N)	American Samoa	13–0	2002 FIFA World Cup qualification	E. Masi (4), Lal (5), Mateiwai, Nasema, Samy (2)	500	
166	11 April 2001	International Sports Stadium, Coffs Harbour (N)	Samoa	6–1	2002 FIFA World Cup qualification	Mateiwai, M. Masi (2), Prasad (2), Lal	400	
167	14 April 2001	International Sports Stadium, Coffs Harbour (N)	Australia	0–2	2002 FIFA World Cup qualification		5,000	
168	16 April 2001	International Sports Stadium, Coffs Harbour (N)	Tonga	8–1	2002 FIFA World Cup qualification	Leka, E. Masi (4), Vurukania (2), Nasema	1,000	
169	6 July 2002	Mount Smart Stadium, Auckland (N)	New Caledonia	2–1	2002 OFC Nations Cup	Toma, Bukaudi	1,000	
170	8 July 2002	Mount Smart Stadium, Auckland (N)	Vanuatu	0–1	2002 OFC Nations Cup		800	
171	10 July 2002	Mount Smart Stadium, Auckland (N)	Australia	0–8	2002 OFC Nations Cup		1,000	
172	1 May 2003	Fiji (H)	Tuvalu	9–0	Friendly	Unknown	—	
173	30 June 2003	National Stadium, Suva (N)	Vanuatu	0–0	2003 South Pacific Games		—	
174	1 July 2003	National Stadium, Suva (N)	Tuvalu	4–0	2003 South Pacific Games	E. Masi (2), Kumar (2)	3,000	
175	5 July 2003	Ratu Cakobau Park, Nausori (N)	Kiribati	12–0	2003 South Pacific Games	Vulivuli, E. Masi (7), Gataurua, Rabo, Rodu, Baleinuku	4,000	
176	7 July 2003	Churchill Park, Lautoka (N)	Solomon Islands	2–1	2003 South Pacific Games	Toma, E. Masi	6,000	
177	9 July 2003	Churchill Park, Lautoka (N)	Tahiti	2–1 (a.s.d.e.t.)	2003 South Pacific Games	Waqa, Toma	8,000	
178	11 July 2003	National Stadium, Suva (N)	New Caledonia	2–0	2003 South Pacific Games	M. Masi, E. Masi	9,000	
179	12 May 2004	Toleofoa Joseph Blatter Soccer Complex, Apia (N)	Papua New Guinea	4–2	2006 FIFA World Cup qualification	Rabo, Toma, Gataurua, Rokotakala	400	
180	15 May 2004	Toleofoa Joseph Blatter Soccer Complex, Apia (N)	American Samoa	11–0	2006 FIFA World Cup qualification	Toma (3), Vulivuli, Rokotakala (2), Sabutu (2), E. Masi, Gataurua (2)	300	
181	17 May 2004	Toleofoa Joseph Blatter Soccer Complex, Apia (N)	Samoa	4–0	2006 FIFA World Cup qualification	Toma, Sabutu, E. Masi, Rokotakala	450	
182	19 May 2004	Toleofoa Joseph Blatter Soccer Complex, Apia (N)	Vanuatu	0–3	2006 FIFA World Cup qualification		200	
183	29 May 2004	Hindmarsh Stadium, Adelaide (N)	Tahiti	0–0	2004 OFC Nations Cup		3,000	
184	31 May 2004	Hindmarsh Stadium, Adelaide (N)	Vanuatu	1–0	2004 OFC Nations Cup	Toma	500	
185	2 June 2004	Marden Sports Complex, Adelaide (N)	Australia	1–6	2004 OFC Nations Cup	Gataurua	2,200	
186	4 June 2004	Hindmarsh Stadium, Adelaide (N)	Solomon Islands	1–2	2004 OFC Nations Cup	Toma	1,500	
187	6 June 2004	Hindmarsh Stadium, Adelaide (N)	New Zealand	0–2	2004 OFC Nations Cup		2,000	
188	12 August 2005	Churchill Park, Lautoka (H)	India	1–0	Friendly	E. Masi	—	
189	14 August 2005	National Stadium, Suva (H)	India	2–1	Friendly	Vidovi, E. Masi	—	
190	25 August 2007	Toleofoa Joseph Blatter Soccer Complex, Apia (N)	Tuvalu	16–0	2007 South Pacific Games	Krishna (3), Rabo (3), Bolatoga, Tiwa (2), Vakatalesau (6), Finau	200	
191	28 August 2007	Toleofoa Joseph Blatter Soccer Complex, Apia (N)	Cook Islands	4–0	2007 South Pacific Games	Vakatalesau, Waqa, Bukalidi, Kainihewe	400	
192	1 September 2007	Toleofoa Joseph Blatter Soccer Complex, Apia (N)	Tahiti	4–0	2007 South Pacific Games	Waqa, Bolatoga, Vakatalesau (2)	200	
193	3 September 2007	Toleofoa Joseph Blatter Soccer Complex, Apia (N)	New Caledonia	1–1	2007 South Pacific Games	Kainihewe	1,000	
194	5 September 2007	Toleofoa Joseph Blatter Soccer Complex, Apia (N)	Vanuatu	3–0	2007 South Pacific Games	Bolatoga, Vakatalesau, Krishna	600	
195	7 September 2007	Toleofoa Joseph Blatter Soccer Complex, Apia (N)	New Caledonia	0–1	2007 South Pacific Games		400	
196	17 October 2007	Churchill Park, Lautoka (H)	New Zealand	0–2	2008 OFC Nations Cup		6,000	
197	17 November 2007	Govind Park, Ba (H)	New Caledonia	3–3	2008 OFC Nations Cup	Nawatu, Vakatalesau (2)	1,500	
198	21 November 2007	Stade Numa-Daly Magenta, Nouméa (A)	New Caledonia	0–4	2008 OFC Nations Cup		1,000	
199	6 September 2008	Govind Park, Ba (H)	Vanuatu	2–0	2008 OFC Nations Cup	Kumar, Dunadamu	3,000	
200	10 September 2008	Korman Stadium, Port Vila (A)	Vanuatu	1–2	2008 OFC Nations Cup	Dunadamu	1,200	
201	19 November 2008	Churchill Park, Lautoka (A)	New Zealand	2–0	2008 OFC Nations Cup	Krishna (2)	4,500	
202	13 July 2011	Subrail Park, Labasa (H)	Vanuatu	2–0	Friendly	Bolatoga, Naqeleca	—	
203	15 July 2011	Churchill Park, Lautoka (H)	Vanuatu	1–2	Friendly	Avinesh	—	
204	17 August 2011	Ratu Cakobau Park, Nausori (H)	Samoa	3–0	Friendly	Krishna, Kainihewe, Dau	—	
205	18 August 2011	National Stadium, Suva (H)	Samoa	5–1	Friendly	Krishna (3), Tiwa (2)	—	
206	27 August 2011	Stade Boewa, Boulari Bay (N)	Tahiti	3–0	2011 Pacific Games	Waqa, Marmouyet (o.g.), Rokotakala	—	
207	30 August 2011	Stade Boewa, Boulari Bay (N)	Kiribati	9–0	2011 Pacific Games	Krishna (3), Suwamy, Avinesh, Dunadamu (2), Kamta (o.g.), Manuca	—	
208	3 September 2011	Stade Boewa, Boulari Bay (N)	Cook Islands	4–1	2011 Pacific Games	Krishna, Kainihewe, Dunadamu, Suwamy	—	
209	5 September 2011	Stade Boewa, Boulari Bay (N)	Papua New Guinea	2–0	2011 Pacific Games	Suwamy, Kainihewe	—	
210	7 September 2011	Stade Hnassé, Lifou (N)	Solomon Islands	1–2 (a.e.t.)	2011 Pacific Games	Dunadamu	—	
211	9 September 2011	Stade Boewa, Boulari Bay (N)	Tahiti	1–2	2011 Pacific Games	Avinesh	—	
212	2 June 2012	Lawson Tama Stadium, Honiara (N)	New Zealand	0–1	2012 OFC Nations Cup		15,000	
213	4 June 2012	Lawson Tama Stadium, Honiara (N)	Solomon Islands	0–0	2012 OFC Nations Cup		12,000	
214	6 June 2012	Lawson Tama Stadium, Honiara (N)	Papua New Guinea	1–1	2012 OFC Nations Cup	Dunadamu	3,000	
215	19 August 2015	Govind Park, Ba (H)	Tonga	5–0	Friendly	Tiwa (2), Singh, Vakatalesau, Qasevakatini	—	
216	27 August 2015	Prince Charles Park, Nadi (H)	American Samoa	6–0	Friendly	Qasevakatini (2), Kerevanuna, Tiwa, Waranaivalu, Vakatalesau	—	
217	7 November 2015	Port Vila Municipal Stadium, Port Vila (A)	Vanuatu	1–1	Friendly	Shaheed	—	
218	10 November 2015	Port Vila Municipal Stadium, Port Vila (A)	Vanuatu	1–2	Friendly	Krishna	—	
219	28 May 2016	Sir John Guise Stadium, Port Moresby (N)	New Zealand	1–3	2016 OFC Nations Cup	Krishna	378	
220	31 May 2016	Sir John Guise Stadium, Port Moresby (N)	Solomon Islands	1–0	2016 OFC Nations Cup	Krishna	798	
221	4 June 2016	Sir John Guise Stadium, Port Moresby (N)	Vanuatu	2–3	2016 OFC Nations Cup	Kautoga, Krishna	851	
222	26 June 2016	Prince Charles Park, Nadi (H)	Malaysia	1–1	Friendly	Krishna	—	
223	25 March 2017	Churchill Park, Lautoka (H)	New Zealand	0–2	2018 FIFA World Cup qualification		7,000	
224	28 March 2017	Wellington Regional Stadium, Wellington (A)	New Zealand	0–2	2018 FIFA World Cup qualification		10,133	
225	25 May 2017	Prince Charles Park, Nadi (H)	Solomon Islands	1–1	Friendly	Saukuru	—	
226	28 May 2017	Churchill Park, Lautoka (H)	Solomon Islands	1–0	Friendly	Sivoki	—	
227	7 June 2017	Churchill Park, Lautoka (H)	New Caledonia	2–2	2018 FIFA World Cup qualification	Waqa, Krishna	1,500	
228	11 June 2017	Stade Numa-Daly Magenta, Nouméa (A)	New Caledonia	1–2	2018 FIFA World Cup qualification	Saukuru	1,050	
229	2 September 2017	Stadion Patriot, Bekasi (A)	Indonesia	0–0	Friendly		17,518	
230	19 November 2017	National Stadium, Suva (H)	Estonia	0–2	Friendly		—	
231	2 December 2017	Port Vila Municipal Stadium, Port Vila (N)	Tuvalu	8–0	2017 Pacific Mini Games	Wasasala (4), Waqa (3), Matarerega	1,000	
232	6 December 2017	Korman Stadium, Port Vila (N)	Solomon Islands	0–0	2017 Pacific Mini Games		4,000	
233	9 December 2017	Port Vila Municipal Stadium, Port Vila (N)	Vanuatu	1–1	2017 Pacific Mini Games	Wasasala	7,000	
234	12 December 2017	Port Vila Municipal Stadium, Port Vila (N)	Tonga	4–0	2017 Pacific Mini Games	Waqa (2), Qasevakatini, Radrigai	1,000	
235	15 December 2017	Port Vila Municipal Stadium, Port Vila (N)	New Caledonia	4–1	2017 Pacific Mini Games	Waqa (2), Tuivuna, Matarerega	1,500	
236	22 March 2018	Rizal Memorial Stadium, Manila (A)	Philippines	2–3	Friendly	Votoniu, Krishna	1,526	
237	5 July 2018	Kuala Lumpur Stadium, Kuala Lumpur (A)	Malaysia	0–1	Friendly		4,970	
238	5 September 2018	National Stadium, Suva (H)	Solomon Islands	1–1	Friendly	Krishna	4,200	
239	11 September 2018	Bishan Stadium, Singapore (A)	Singapore	0–2	Friendly		—	
240	28 March 2019	National Stadium, Suva (H)	New Caledonia	3–0	Friendly	Drudru (2), Matarerega	600	
241	24 March 2019	Churchill Park, Lautoka (H)	Mauritius	1–0	Friendly	Krishna	1,800	
242	7 June 2019	Korman Stadium, Port Vila (N)	Tahiti	1–1	Friendly	Radrigai	—	
243	10 June 2019	Korman Stadium, Port Vila (A)	Vanuatu	0–0	Friendly		—	
244	8 July 2019	National Soccer Stadium, Apia (N)	Tahiti	2–1	2019 Pacific Games	Drudru, Krishna	500	
245	10 July 2019	National Soccer Stadium, Apia (N)	American Samoa	9–0	2019 Pacific Games	Vodowaqa (4), Rakula (2), Wasasala (2), Hughes	250	
246	12 July 2019	National Soccer Stadium, Apia (N)	New Caledonia	0–1	2019 Pacific Games		800	
247	15 July 2019	National Soccer Stadium, Apia (N)	Tuvalu	10–1	2019 Pacific Games	Tekiate, Matarerega, Rakula, Wasasala (2), Vodowaqa (2), Sami, Krishna (2)	250	
248	18 July 2019	National Soccer Stadium, Apia (N)	Solomon Islands	4–4	2019 Pacific Games	Joseph, Drudru, Krishna (2)	1,000	
249	20 July 2019	National Soccer Stadium, Apia (N)	Papua New Guinea	1–1 (4–2p)	2019 Pacific Games	Krishna	700	
250	10 March 2022	Qatar University Stadium, Doha (N)	Vanuatu	3–0	Friendly	Nalaubu (3)	—	
251	18 March 2022	Qatar SC Stadium, Doha (N)	New Caledonia	2–1	2022 FIFA World Cup qualification	Nalaubu (2)	—	
252	21 March 2022	Qatar SC Stadium, Doha (N)	New Zealand	0–4	2022 FIFA World Cup qualification		—	
253	24 March 2022	Al Arabi Stadium, Doha (N)	Papua New Guinea	1–2	2022 FIFA World Cup qualification	Waranaivalu	—	
254	28 March 2022	Hamad bin Khalifa Stadium, Doha (N)	Vanuatu	2–1	Friendly	Krishna (2)	—	
255	17 September 2022	Korman Stadium, Port Vila (N)	New Caledonia	1–0	2022 MSG Prime Minister's Cup	Matanisiga	—	
256	24 September 2022	Korman Stadium, Port Vila (N)	Solomon Islands	2–2	2022 MSG Prime Minister's Cup	Krishna, Tekiate	—	
257	27 September 2022	Korman Stadium, Port Vila (N)	Papua New Guinea	0–1	2022 MSG Prime Minister's Cup		—	
258	30 September 2022	Korman Stadium, Port Vila (N)	Solomon Islands	1–0	2022 MSG Prime Minister's Cup	Wasasala	—	
259	20 March 2023	Churchill Park, Lautoka (H)	Vanuatu	1–2	Friendly	Joseph	—	
260	26 March 2023	Churchill Park, Lautoka (H)	Solomon Islands	0–2	Friendly		—	
261	18 November 2023	SIFF Academy Field, Honiara (N)	Northern Mariana Islands	10–0	2023 Pacific Games	Krishna (3), Nalaubu (2), Begg, Dogalau, Pablo (o.g.), Dunn, Matanisiga	—	
262	21 November 2023	SIFF Academy Field, Honiara (N)	Tahiti	0–0	2023 Pacific Games		—	
263	28 November 2023	Lawson Tama Stadium, Honiara (N)	Solomon Islands	0–2	2023 Pacific Games		13,000	
264	1 December 2023	Lawson Tama Stadium, Honiara (N)	Vanuatu	4–2	2023 Pacific Games	Dunn (2), Begg, Nand	—	
265	18 March 2024	Lawson Tama Stadium, Honiara (A)	Solomon Islands	1–2	Friendly	Raheem	—	
266	21 March 2024	Lawson Tama Stadium, Honiara (A)	Solomon Islands	2–0	Friendly	Raheem, Krishna	—	
267	16 June 2024	National Stadium, Suva (N)	Papua New Guinea	5–1	2024 OFC Nations Cup	Begg, Dunn (2), Komolong (o.g.), Krishna	1,700	
268	19 June 2024	National Stadium, Suva (N)	Samoa	9–1	2024 OFC Nations Cup	Hughes (2), Dunn, Krishna (2), Baravilala, Begg, Dogalau (2)	1,300	
269	22 June 2024	National Stadium, Suva (N)	Tahiti	1–0	2024 OFC Nations Cup	Krishna	1,500	
270	27 June 2024	Freshwater Stadium, Port Vila (N)	Vanuatu	1–2	2024 OFC Nations Cup	Cavuilagi	5,200	
271	30 June 2024	Freshwater Stadium, Port Vila (N)	Tahiti	1–2	2024 OFC Nations Cup	Krishna	3,000	
272	2 September 2024	National Stadium, Suva (H)	Solomon Islands	1–0	Friendly	Waranaivalu	—	
273	8 September 2024	Churchill Park, Lautoka (H)	Hong Kong	1–1	Friendly	Radrigai	—	
274	10 October 2024	National Stadium, Suva (N)	Solomon Islands	1–0	2026 FIFA World Cup qualification	Krishna	2,000	
275	14 November 2024	PNG Football Stadium, Port Moresby (N)	Papua New Guinea	3–3	2026 FIFA World Cup qualification	Dunn, Krishna, Nand	1,428	
276	17 November 2024	PNG Football Stadium, Port Moresby (N)	New Caledonia	1–1	2026 FIFA World Cup qualification	Krishna	877	
277	12 December 2024	Lawson Tama Stadium, Honiara (N)	Vanuatu	1–1	2024 MSG Prime Minister's Cup	Nalaubu	—	
278	15 December 2024	National Stadium, Honiara (N)	Papua New Guinea	1–1	2024 MSG Prime Minister's Cup	Nalaubu	—	
279	21 December 2024	Lawson Tama Stadium, Honiara (N)	Solomon Islands	3–1	2024 MSG Prime Minister's Cup	Matanisiga, Nalaubu, Dunn	—	
280	21 March 2025	Wellington Regional Stadium, Wellington (N)	New Zealand	0–7	2026 FIFA World Cup qualification		20,947	
281	4 September 2025	Kanchanaburi Province Stadium, Mueang Kanchanaburi (N)	Thailand	0–3	2025 King's Cup		—	
282	7 September 2025	Kanchanaburi Province Stadium, Mueang Kanchanaburi (N)	Hong Kong	0–8	2025 King's Cup		—	
283	17 November 2025	PNG Football Stadium, Port Moresby (N)	Vanuatu	0–2	2025 MSG Prime Minister's Cup		—	
284	20 November 2025	PNG Football Stadium, Port Moresby (N)	Papua New Guinea	0–2	2025 MSG Prime Minister's Cup		—	
—	22 November 2025	PNG Football Stadium, Port Moresby (N)	Solomon Islands	1–1 (abandoned)	2025 MSG Prime Minister's Cup	Wasasala	—	
285	6 June 2026	Freshwater Stadium, Port Vila (A)	Vanuatu	1–2	Friendly	Mohammed	—	
286	9 June 2026	Freshwater Stadium, Port Vila (A)	Vanuatu	2–2	Friendly	Thomas (o.g.), Krishna	—	
287	18 September 2026	National Stadium, Suva (N)	Solomon Islands	3–3	2026 MSG Prime Minister's Cup	Krishna, Dau, Dunn	—	
288	21 September 2026	National Stadium, Suva (N)	Vanuatu	0–1	2026 MSG Prime Minister's Cup		—	
289	27 September 2026	National Stadium, Suva (N)	Papua New Guinea	2–0	2026 MSG Prime Minister's Cup	Krishna, Vasconcellos	—	
290	30 September 2026	National Stadium, Suva (N)	New Caledonia	2–1	2026 MSG Prime Minister's Cup	Wara, Dau	—	
291	3 October 2026	National Stadium, Suva (N)	Vanuatu	1–0	2026 MSG Prime Minister's Cup	Dunn	—	

Notes

1. A: The 2000 Melanesia Cup doubled as qualifiers for the 2000 OFC Nations Cup.
2. B: The first round of Oceanian qualifiers for the 2006 FIFA World Cup doubled as qualifiers for the 2004 OFC Nations Cup.
3. C: The 2004 OFC Nations Cup doubled as the second round of qualifiers for the 2006 FIFA World Cup.
4. D: The men's football tournament at the 2007 South Pacific Games doubled as qualifiers for the 2008 OFC Nations Cup and the first round of qualifiers for the 2010 FIFA World Cup.
5. E: The 2008 OFC Nations Cup doubled as the second round of qualifiers for the 2010 FIFA World Cup.
6. F: The New Zealand-Fiji match was originally scheduled for 13 October 2007 but was postponed by FIFA after Fijian goalkeeper Simione Tamanisau was denied a visa by the New Zealand immigration authorities. The match was first rescheduled to be played in the neutral country of Samoa, but subsequently moved to Fiji.
7. G: The 2012 OFC Nations Cup doubled as the second round of qualifiers for the 2014 FIFA World Cup.
8. H: The 2016 OFC Nations Cup doubled as the second round of qualifiers for the 2018 FIFA World Cup.
9. I: Match abandoned at half time due to rain.

== Record by opponent ==
Team	Pld	W	D	L	GF	GA	GD	WPCT
American Samoa	4	4	0	0	39	0	+39	100.00
Australia	3	0	0	3	1	16	−15	0.00
Cook Islands	2	2	0	0	8	1	+7	100.00
Estonia	1	0	0	1	0	2	−2	0.00
Hong Kong	2	0	1	1	1	9	−8	0.00
India	2	2	0	0	3	1	+2	100.00
Indonesia	1	0	1	0	0	0	0	0.00
Kiribati	2	2	0	0	21	0	+21	100.00
Malaysia	5	2	1	2	8	5	+3	40.00
Mauritius	1	1	0	0	1	0	+1	100.00
New Caledonia	16	8	4	4	26	20	+6	50.00
New Zealand	9	1	0	8	3	23	−20	11.11
Northern Mariana Islands	1	1	0	0	10	0	+10	100.00
Papua New Guinea	12	5	4	3	25	14	+11	41.67
Philippines	1	0	0	1	2	3	−1	0.00
Samoa	5	5	0	0	27	3	+24	100.00
Singapore	1	0	0	1	0	2	−2	0.00
Solomon Islands	21	8	8	5	28	25	+3	38.10
Tahiti	10	5	3	2	15	7	+8	50.00
Thailand	1	0	0	1	0	3	−3	0.00
Tonga	3	3	0	0	17	1	+16	100.00
Tuvalu	5	5	0	0	47	1	+46	100.00
Vanuatu	26	9	6	11	34	31	+3	34.62
Total	134	63	28	43	316	167	+149	47.01

Source: Results
