= 2010 FIFA World Cup qualification (OFC) =

Football tournament

Tournament details
- Dates: 25 August 2007 - 14 November 2009
- Teams: 11 (from 1 confederation)

Tournament statistics
- Matches played: 36
- Goals scored: 149 (4.14 per match)
- Attendance: 57,989 (1,611 per match)
- Top scorer(s): (Fiji) Osea Vakatalesau (12 goals)

The 2010 FIFA World Cup qualification for the Oceania Football Confederation (OFC) selected New Zealand to compete in a two-legged home-and-away playoff against Bahrain, the fifth-place team from the Asian Football Confederation (AFC) for a spot in the 2010 FIFA World Cup in South Africa. (Oceania is the only confederation that does not have an automatic place in the finals.) Its final round that doubled with the qualifiers was the 2008 OFC Nations Cup. Consequently, New Zealand is also considered the OFC Nations Cup champion, entered the playoffs, and represented the OFC in the 2009 FIFA Confederations Cup.

This was the first OFC World Cup qualifying campaign since Australia's move from the OFC to the AFC.

== Format ==
The first phase began at the 2007 Pacific Games in Samoa, with the football tournament doubling as an OFC World Cup qualifying competition. The gold, silver, and bronze medallists (New Caledonia, Fiji, and Vanuatu, respectively) advanced to the second phase.

The three medallists joined seeded side New Zealand in a home-and-away round-robin tournament on FIFA match dates in 2007 and 2008, also acting as the 2008 OFC Nations Cup.

There were some confusion as to how the final qualifier for the playoff against an AFC nation would be selected. The FIFA website initially indicated that the top two sides from the round robin would advance to a play-off which would determine the qualifier, but the OFC articles did not include this round (with the round-robin winner advancing automatically). Later FIFA articles confirmed that the round-robin winner would advance automatically.

== First round ==
The 2007 South Pacific Games held the first round. The draw was held on 12 June 2007 in Auckland, New Zealand. Tuvalu were not members of FIFA and so would have been unable to qualify for the World Cup had they proceeded to the OFC Nations Cup stage. It was not even clear whether Tuvalu would be eligible to advance that far had they finished in a medal position, as the OFC press release for the second stage draw stated that "nine eligible member associations battle it out for the gold, silver and bronze medals that will hand them a berth in a Stage Two round robin home and away playoff with New Zealand" - implying one nation (Tuvalu) would not be eligible. This question was rendered moot, however, as Tuvalu finished last in their table.

Papua New Guinea, having initially entered the 2010 World Cup and indicated their intention to enter the South Pacific Games, were involved in a dispute with their sporting authorities and failed to meet the official accreditation deadline for the South Pacific Games. This meant they were effectively disqualified from the World Cup.

=== Group stage ===
==== Group A ====
| Team | Pld | W | D | L | GF | GA | GD | Pts | Fiji national football team | New Caledonia national football team | Tahiti national football team | Cook Islands national football team | Tuvalu national football team |
|---|---|---|---|---|---|---|---|---|---|---|---|---|---|
| Fiji | 4 | 3 | 1 | 0 | 25 | 1 | +24 | 10 | | | | 4–0 | 16–0 |
| New Caledonia | 4 | 3 | 1 | 0 | 6 | 1 | +5 | 10 | 1–1 | | | 3–0 | |
| Tahiti | 4 | 1 | 1 | 2 | 2 | 6 | −4 | 4 | 0–4 | 0–1 | | | |
| Cook Islands | 4 | 1 | 0 | 3 | 4 | 9 | −5 | 3 | | | 0–1 | | 4–1 |
| Tuvalu (Note: Tuvalu were not members of FIFA and so were not eligible to qualify for the World Cup.) | 4 | 0 | 1 | 3 | 2 | 22 | −20 | 1 | | 0–1 | 1–1 | | |

Legend: Blue = home team win; Yellow = draw; Red = away team win.
Notes:

Semi-finals
Solomon Islands | 2
New Caledonia | 3
Fiji | 3
Vanuatu | 0

Final
New Caledonia | 1
Fiji | 0
Third place match
Solomon Islands | 0
Vanuatu | 2

==== Group B ====
| Team | Pld | W | D | L | GF | GA | GD | Pts | Solomon Islands national football team | Vanuatu national football team | Samoa national football team | Tonga national football team | American Samoa national football team |
|---|---|---|---|---|---|---|---|---|---|---|---|---|---|
| Solomon Islands | 4 | 4 | 0 | 0 | 21 | 1 | +20 | 12 | | | | 4–0 | 12–1 |
| Vanuatu | 4 | 3 | 0 | 1 | 23 | 3 | +20 | 9 | 0–2 | | 4–0 | | |
| Samoa | 4 | 2 | 0 | 2 | 9 | 8 | +1 | 6 | 0–3 | | | 2–1 | |
| Tonga | 4 | 1 | 0 | 3 | 6 | 10 | −4 | 3 | | 1–4 | | | 4–0 |
| American Samoa | 4 | 0 | 0 | 4 | 1 | 38 | −37 | 0 | | 0–15 | 0–7 | | |

Legend: Blue = home team win; Yellow = draw; Red = away team win.

Semi-finals
Solomon Islands | 2
New Caledonia | 3
Fiji | 3
Vanuatu | 0

Final
New Caledonia | 1
Fiji | 0
Third place match
Solomon Islands | 0
Vanuatu | 2

=== Knockout stage ===
Semi-finals
Solomon Islands | 2
New Caledonia | 3
Fiji | 3
Vanuatu | 0

Final
New Caledonia | 1
Fiji | 0
Third place match
Solomon Islands | 0
Vanuatu | 2

The three medalists, New Caledonia, Fiji, and Vanuatu, advanced to the 2008 OFC Nations Cup (together with automatic qualifier New Zealand).

== Second round ==
| Pos | Team | Pld | W | D | L | GF | GA | GD | Pts | Qualification | (New Zealand) | (New Caledonia) | (Fiji) | (Vanuatu) |
|---|---|---|---|---|---|---|---|---|---|---|---|---|---|---|
| 1 | New Zealand (C) | 6 | 5 | 0 | 1 | 14 | 5 | +9 | 15 | Advance to inter-confederation play-offs | — | 3–0 | 0–2 | 4–1 |
| 2 | New Caledonia | 6 | 2 | 2 | 2 | 12 | 10 | +2 | 8 | | 1–3 | — | 4–0 | 3–0 |
| 3 | Fiji | 6 | 2 | 1 | 3 | 8 | 11 | −3 | 7 | | 0–2 | 3–3 | — | 2–0 |
| 4 | Vanuatu | 6 | 1 | 1 | 4 | 5 | 13 | −8 | 4 | | 1–2 | 1–1 | 2–1 | — |

Legend: Blue = home team win; Yellow = draw; Red = away team win.
(C) Champions

New Zealand qualified for the play-off against the AFC playoff winner, as well as the 2009 FIFA Confederations Cup in South Africa.

== Inter-confederation play-offs ==
The Oceania champion (New Zealand) played the AFC playoff winner, Bahrain, in a two-legged play-off; New Zealand beat Bahrain to qualify for the 2010 World Cup.

The draw for the order in which the two matches would be played was held on 2 June 2009 during the FIFA Congress in Nassau, the Bahamas.

| Team 1 | Agg. | Team 2 | 1st leg | 2nd leg |
|---|---|---|---|---|
| Bahrain | 0–1 | New Zealand | 0–0 | 0–1 |

== Qualified teams ==
The following team from OFC qualified for the final tournament.

| Team | Qualified as | Qualified on | Previous appearances in FIFA World Cup^{1} |
|---|---|---|---|
| New Zealand | AFC-OFC play-off winners | 14 November 2009 | 1 (1982) |

^{1} Bold indicates champions for that year. Italic indicates hosts for that year.

== Top goalscorers ==
There were 149 goals scored in 36 matches, for an average of 4.14 goals per match.

12 goals

- (Fiji) Osea Vakatalesau

9 goals

- (Vanuatu) Seule Soromon

8 goals

- (New Zealand) Shane Smeltz

7 goals

- (Solomon Islands) Commins Menapi

6 goals

- (Fiji) Roy Krishna
- (Vanuatu) François Sakama

5 goals

- (New Caledonia) Michel Hmaé
- (New Caledonia) Iamel Kabeu
- (Vanuatu) Etienne Mermer

4 goals

- (New Caledonia) Pierre Wajoka
- (Solomon Islands) Henry Fa'arodo
- (Solomon Islands) Benjamin Totori

3 goals

- (Fiji) Pita Baleitoga
- (Fiji) Pita Rabo
- (New Zealand) David Mulligan

Below are full goalscorer lists for each round:

- First round
- Second round
