= Hmaé =

Hmaé is a surname. Notable people with the surname include:

- Michel Hmaé (born 1978), New Caledonian footballer
- José Hmaé (born 1978), New Caledonian footballer
