= Mele =

Mele may refer to:

== Places ==
- Mele, Liguria, a comune in Italy
- Mele, Gornja Radgona, Slovenia
- Mele (island), an island in the Shefa province of Vanuatu
- Mele, Maharashtra, a village in Ratnagiri district, Maharashtra state in Western India
- Myla, Russia, or Mele

== Other ==
- Mele (Hawaiian term), a Hawaiian term for chants, songs, or poems
- Mele (name), including a list of people with that name

== See also ==
- Male (disambiguation)
- Mel (disambiguation)
- Mele-on
- Melee (disambiguation)
- Meles (disambiguation)
