= André Sinédo =

New Caledonian footballer (1978–2022)

Personal information
- Date of birth: 26 February 1978
- Place of birth: New Caledonia
- Date of death: 2 October 2022 (aged 44)
- Position: Defender

Senior career*
Years	Team	Apps	(Gls)
2001–2013	AS Magenta	209	(5)

International career
2002–2011	New Caledonia	27	(1)
Medal record
Men's football
Representing New Caledonia
OFC Nations Cup
Runner-up	2008 Oceania
Pacific Games
Gold medal – first place	2007 Samoa
Gold medal – first place	2011 New Caledonia
Silver medal – second place	2003 Fiji
- * Club domestic league appearances and goals

André Sinédo (26 February 1978 – 2 October 2022) was a New Calendonian footballer who played as a defender. He latterly played for AS Magenta in the New Caledonia Division Honneur and the New Caledonia national football team.

== Honours ==
New Caledonia

- OFC Nations Cup: Runner-up 2008
- Pacific Games: Gold Medalist, 2007 2011; Silver Medalist, 2003
