= National Soccer Stadium =

National Soccer Stadium may refer to:

- BMO Field, Toronto, Canada
- National Soccer Stadium (Samoa), in Apia
