= Judd Molea =

Solomon Islands footballer (born 1988)

Personal information
- Date of birth: 23 August 1988 (age 38)
- Place of birth: Solomon Islands
- Positions: Midfielder; defensive midfielder

Team information
- Current team: Solomon Warriors
- Number: 10

Senior career*
Years	Team	Apps	(Gls)
2004–2006	Solomon Warriors		
2006–2007	Queensland Academy of Sport		
2007–2010	Kossa		
2010	Solomon Warriors		
2009–2011	Lautoka		
2011–2012	Sunshine Coast F.C.		
2011–2014	Solomon Warriors		(3)
2014–2016	Western United		
2016–	Solomon Warriors		

International career^{‡}
2007–	Solomon Islands	13	(3)
- * Club domestic league appearances and goals as of 23 September 2014 ‡ National team caps and goals as of 29 August 2018

Judd Molea (born 23 August 1988) is a Solomon Islands footballer who currently plays for Solomon Warriors in Honiara as a midfielder.

== Honours ==
Solomon Warriors

- Solomon Islands S-League (1): 2014

== International career ==
Molea played his first international game with the senior national team on 25 August 2007 against American Samoa (12–1) at the 2007 South Pacific Games.

=== International goals ===
As of match played 8 June 2016. Solomon Islands score listed first, score column indicates score after each Molea goal.

International goals by date, venue, cap, opponent, score, result and competition
No.	Date	Venue	Cap	Opponent	Score	Result	Competition
1	25 August 2007	National Soccer Stadium, Apia, Samoa	2	American Samoa	9–1	12–1	2007 Pacific Games
2	8 June 2016	Sir John Guise Stadium, Port Moresby, Papua New Guinea	12	Papua New Guinea	1–1	1–2	2016 OFC Nations Cup
3	29 August 2018	Estádio Campo Desportivo, Taipa, Macau	13	Macau	1–0	4–1	Friendly
