= Taniela Waqa =

Fijian footballer (born 1983)

Personal information
- Full name: Taniela Evo Waqa
- Date of birth: June 22, 1983 (age 43)
- Place of birth: Fiji
- Position: Defender

Team information
- Current team: Labasa FC
- Number: 18

Senior career*
| Years | Team | Apps | (Gls) |
| –2003 | Olympian Team | | |
| 2003–2008 | Lautoka F.C. | | |
| 2008–2011 | Labasa FC | | |
| 2011–17 | Hekari United | | |
| 2017–2020 | Labasa FC | | |

International career^{‡}
| 2003– | Fiji | 35 | (4) |
Medal record
Men's football
Representing Fiji
OFC Nations Cup
| Third place | 2008 Oceania |
OFC U-20 Championship
| Runner-up | 2002 Fiji/Vanuatu |
Pacific Games
| Gold medal – first place | 2003 Fiji |
| Silver medal – second place | 2007 Samoa |
- * Club domestic league appearances and goals ‡ National team caps and goals as of 4 December 2017

Taniela Evo Waqa (born June 22, 1983) is a Fijian association football defender playing for Fiji national football team and Labasa FC in the Fijian National Football League. He also participated in the 2007 South Pacific Games football tournament. He retired at the end of 2020.

== Career statistics ==
=== International ===
Appearances and goals by national team and year
| National team | Year | Apps | Goals |
|---|---|---|---|
| Fiji | 2003 | 5 | 1 |
| Fiji | 2004 | 8 | 0 |
| Fiji | 2005 | 2 | 0 |
| Fiji | 2007 | 7 | 2 |
| Fiji | 2008 | 2 | 0 |
| Fiji | 2011 | 8 | 1 |
| Fiji | 2012 | 3 | 0 |
| Fiji | 2017 | 2 | 0 |
| Total | | 37 | 4 |

Scores and results list Fiji's goal tally first, score column indicates score after each Waqa goal.

List of international goals scored by Taniela Waqa
| No. | Date | Venue | Opponent | Score | Result | Competition | Ref. |
|---|---|---|---|---|---|---|---|
| 1 | 9 July 2003 | Churchill Park, Lautoka, Fiji | Tahiti | 1–1 | 2–1 | 2003 South Pacific Games | |
| 2 | 27 August 2007 | National Soccer Stadium, Apia, Samoa | Cook Islands | 2–0 | 4–0 | 2007 South Pacific Games | |
| 3 | 1 September 2007 | National Soccer Stadium, Apia, Samoa | Tahiti | 1–0 | 4–0 | 2007 South Pacific Games | |
| 4 | 27 August 2011 | Stade Boewa, Boulari Bay, New Caledonia | Tahiti | 1–0 | 3–0 | 2011 South Pacific Games | |

== Honours ==
=== Player ===
Fiji

- OFC Nations Cup: 3rd place, 2008
- Pacific Games: Gold Medalist, 2003; Silver Medalist, 2007

Fiji U20

- OFC U-20 Championship: Runner-Up, 2002

=== Individual ===
- 2015 Fiji Football Association Cup Tournament Player of the Tournament
