= Paul Poatinda =

New Caledonian footballer (born 1978)

Personal information
- Date of birth: 7 December 1978 (age 47)
- Position: Forward

Senior career*
Years	Team	Apps	(Gls)
2004–2015	AS Magenta		

International career
2003–2004	New Caledonia	10	(10)
Medal record
Men's football
Representing New Caledonia
Pacific Games
Silver medal – second place	2003 Fiji
- * Club domestic league appearances and goals

Paul Poatinda (born 7 December 1978) is a New Caledonian retired international footballer who played as a forward. He represented New Caledonia at the 2003 South Pacific Games.

== Career statistics ==
=== International ===
Appearances and goals by national team and year
National team	Year	Apps	Goals
New Caledonia	2003	6	7
New Caledonia	2004	4	3
Total		10	10

Scores and results list New Caledonia's goal tally first, score column indicates score after each Poatinda goal.

List of international goals scored by Paul Poatinda
No.	Date	Venue	Opponent	Score	Result	Competition	Ref.
1	1 July 2003	ANZ Stadium, Suva, Fiji	Federated States of Micronesia	2–0	18–0	2003 South Pacific Games	
2	1 July 2003	ANZ Stadium, Suva, Fiji	Federated States of Micronesia	3–0	18–0	2003 South Pacific Games	
3	1 July 2003	ANZ Stadium, Suva, Fiji	Federated States of Micronesia	6–0	18–0	2003 South Pacific Games	
4	1 July 2003	ANZ Stadium, Suva, Fiji	Federated States of Micronesia	7–0	18–0	2003 South Pacific Games	
5	1 July 2003	ANZ Stadium, Suva, Fiji	Federated States of Micronesia	12–0	18–0	2003 South Pacific Games	
6	1 July 2003	ANZ Stadium, Suva, Fiji	Federated States of Micronesia	14–0	18–0	2003 South Pacific Games	
7	5 July 2003	Ratu Cakobau Park, Nausori, Fiji	Tahiti	4–0	4–0	2003 South Pacific Games	
8	19 May 2004	Lawson Tama Stadium, Honiara, Solomon Islands	Tonga	2–0	8–0	2006 FIFA World Cup qualification	
9	19 May 2004	Lawson Tama Stadium, Honiara, Solomon Islands	Tonga	3–0	8–0	2006 FIFA World Cup qualification	
10	19 May 2004	Lawson Tama Stadium, Honiara, Solomon Islands	Tonga	8–0	8–0	2006 FIFA World Cup qualification	

== Honours ==
New Caledonia

- Pacific Games: Silver Medalist, 2003
