= Robert Wayaridri =

New Caledonian footballer (born 1971)

Personal information
- Full name: Robert Wayaridri
- Date of birth: 22 March 1971 (age 55)
- Place of birth: Nouméa, New Caledonia
- Position: Defender

Senior career*
Years	Team	Apps	(Gls)
1997–2001	Gazélec Ajaccio	114	(1)
2001–2003	ES Fréjus	40	(1)
2006–2009	JS Baco		

International career
2007	New Caledonia	5	(0)
Medal record
Men's football
Representing New Caledonia
Pacific Games
Gold medal – first place	2007 Samoa
- * Club domestic league appearances and goals

Robert Wayaridri (born 22 March 1971) is a New Caledonian former professional footballer who played as a defender.

== Honours ==
New Caledonia

- Pacific Games: Gold Medalist, 2007
