= Desmond Fa'aiuaso =

Samoan footballer

Personal information
- Full name: Desmond Richmond Fa'aiuaso
- Date of birth: 24 February 1984 (age 42)
- Place of birth: Samoa
- Position: Striker

Team information
- Current team: Strickland Brothers Lepea
- Number: 10

Senior career*
Years	Team	Apps	(Gls)
2000–2001	Titavi		
2002–2004	Strickland Brothers Lepea		(38)
2005	Tuanaimoto Breeze		
2005–2007	A.S. Pirae		
2007–2009	Strickland Brothers Lepea		
2009–2010	YoungHeart Manawatu	5	(0)
2010–2014	Team Taranaki		
2014–2016	Central United		
2016	Strickland Brothers Lepea		
2016	Vailima Kiwi		
2016–	Strickland Brothers Lepea		

International career^{‡}
2001–2016	Samoa	20	(9)
- * Club domestic league appearances and goals as of 1 June 2016 ‡ National team caps and goals as of 24 August 2020

Desmond Fa'aiuaso (born 24 February 1984) is a Football striker from Samoa who currently plays for Vailima Kiwi. He currently has both the most caps and the most goals for his home country, Samoa.

== Football career ==
=== Club career ===
Fa'aiuaso had his first stint in international football with Tahiti side A.S. Pirae and signed up with YoungHeart Manawatu for the 2009–10 season to form an all South Pacific strikeforce with Vanuatuan striker Seule Soromon. He was the first Samoan to play for New Zealand's national league.

=== International career ===
He made his debut for Samoa in an April 2001 FIFA World Cup qualification match against Tonga and scored four goals in his second international, against American Samoa.

In 2016, he coached the Samoan national team.

== Rugby career ==
In 2004 Fa'aiuaso was selected for the Samoa national rugby sevens team for the 2004 Hong Kong Sevens. He was Samoa's top try-scorer in the tournament. In April 2004 he was named to the Samoan team for an Under-21 Rugby World Cup qualifying against Fiji. He was named in the sevens team for the 2007 Dubai Sevens.

== Career statistics ==
=== International ===
Samoa
Year	Apps	Goals
2001	4	4
2002	0	0
2003	0	0
2004	0	0
2005	0	0
2006	0	0
2007	4	2
2008	0	0
2009	0	0
2010	0	0
2011	3	0
2012	0	0
2013	0	0
2014	0	0
2015	3	1
Total	14	7

Statistics accurate as of match played 4 September 2015

=== International goals ===
Scores and results list. Samoa's goal tally first.

List of international goals scored by Desmond Fa'aiuaso
No.	Date	Venue	Opponent	Score	Result	Competition	Ref
1.	9 April 2001	International Sports Stadium, Coffs Harbour, Australia	American Samoa	3–0	8–0	2002 FIFA World Cup qualification	
2.	9 April 2001	International Sports Stadium, Coffs Harbour, Australia	American Samoa	4–0	8–0	2002 FIFA World Cup qualification	
3.	9 April 2001	International Sports Stadium, Coffs Harbour, Australia	American Samoa	7–0	8–0	2002 FIFA World Cup qualification	
4.	9 April 2001	International Sports Stadium, Coffs Harbour, Australia	American Samoa	8–0	8–0	2002 FIFA World Cup qualification	
5.	14 March 2002	National Soccer Stadium, Apia, Samoa	American Samoa	1–0	5–0	2002 OFC Nations Cup qualification	
6.	14 March 2002	National Soccer Stadium, Apia, Samoa	American Samoa	5–0	5–0	2002 OFC Nations Cup qualification	
7.	27 August 2007	National Soccer Stadium, Apia, Samoa	American Samoa	2–0	7–0	2007 South Pacific Games	
8.	29 August 2007	National Soccer Stadium, Apia, Samoa	Tonga	1–0	2–1	2007 South Pacific Games	
9.	31 August 2015	Loto-Tonga Soka Centre, Nuku'alofa, Tonga	American Samoa	1–0	3–2	2018 FIFA World Cup qualification	
