= Robert Calvo =

Vanuatuan professional football manager

Personal information
- Place of birth: Vanuatu

Managerial career
- Years: Team
- 2007–2008: Vanuatu
Medal record
Men's football
Representing Vanuatu (as manager)
Pacific Games
Bronze medal – third place	2007 Samoa

Robert Calvo is a Vanuatuan professional football manager.

== Career ==
Since 2007 until 2008 he coached the Vanuatu national football team.

== Honours ==
=== Manager ===
Vanuatu

- Pacific Games: Bronze Medalist, 2007,
