= Temarii Tinorua =

Tahitian footballer (born 1986)

Personal information
- Date of birth: 19 May 1986 (age 40)
- Place of birth: Tahiti
- Position: Midfielder

Team information
- Current team: A.S. Tefana

Senior career*
Years	Team	Apps	(Gls)
2006–	A.S. Tefana		

International career^{‡}
2007–	Tahiti	12	(1)
Medal record
Men's football
Representing Tahiti
Pacific Games
Bronze medal – third place	2011 New Caledonia
- * Club domestic league appearances and goals as of 23 June 2016 ‡ National team caps and goals as of 23 June 2016

Temarii Tinorua (born 19 May 1986) is a Tahitian footballer who plays as a midfielder for A.S. Tefana in the Tahiti Ligue 1.

== International career ==
=== International goals ===
Scores and results list Tahiti's goal tally first.

No	Date	Venue	Opponent	Score	Result	Competition
1.	3 September 2007	National Soccer Stadium, Apia, Samoa	Cook Islands	1–0	1–0	2007 South Pacific Games

== Honours ==
Tahiti

- Pacific Games: Bronze Medalist, 2011
