= Teariki Mateariki =

Cook Islands footballer (born 1984)

Personal information
- Full name: Teariki Mateariki
- Date of birth: 12 May 1984 (age 42)
- Place of birth: Cook Islands
- Position: Midfielder

Team information
- Current team: Nikao Sokattack

Senior career*
Years	Team	Apps	(Gls)
2003–	Nikao Sokattack		

International career^{‡}
2004–2007	Cook Islands	6	(2)
- * Club domestic league appearances and goals as of 29 July 2013 ‡ National team caps and goals as of 29 July 2013

Teariki Mateariki (born 12 May 1984) in the Cook Islands, is a footballer who played as a midfielder for Nikao Sokattack F.C. in the Cook Islands Round Cup and the Cook Islands national football team.

== International career ==
=== International goals ===
Scores and results list the Cook Islands' goal tally first.

No	Date	Venue	Opponent	Score	Result	Competition
1.	1 September 2007	National Soccer Stadium, Apia, Samoa	Tuvalu	1–0	4–1	2007 South Pacific Games
2.	1 September 2007	National Soccer Stadium, Apia, Samoa	Tuvalu	2–0	4–1	2007 South Pacific Games
