= Fedy Vava =

Vanuatuan footballer

Personal information
- Date of birth: 25 November 1982 (age 43)
- Place of birth: Port Vila, Vanuatu
- Position: Defender

Team information
- Current team: Tafea
- Number: 3

Senior career*
| Years | Team | Apps | (Gls) |
| 2000–2003 | Tafea | | |
| 2004–2006 | Amicale | | |
| 2006– | Tafea | | |
| 2008–2009 | → Port Vila Sharks (loan) | | |
| 2019–2020 | → Ifira Black Bird (loan) | | |

International career^{‡}
| 2003–2012 | Vanuatu | 27 | (2) |
Medal record
Men's football
Representing Vanuatu
Pacific Games
| Bronze medal – third place | 2003 Fiji |
| Bronze medal – third place | 2007 Samoa |
- * Club domestic league appearances and goals ‡ National team caps and goals as of 21:08, 6 November 2016 (UTC)

Fedy Vava, also known as Fredy Vava, (born 25 November 1982) is a Vanuatuan footballer and former international for the Vanuatu national team. He played in the 2012 OFC Nations Cup.

== International goals ==
| No. | Date | Venue | Opponent | Score | Result | Competition |
|---|---|---|---|---|---|---|
| 1. | 3 June 2012 | Lawson Tama Stadium, Honiara, Solomon Islands | Samoa | 5–0 | 5–0 | 2012 OFC Nations Cup |

== Honours ==
Vanuatu

- Pacific Games: Bronze Medalist, 2003, 2007
