= Peni Finau =

Fijian footballer

Personal information
- Full name: Peni Finau Lesubulamailepanoni
- Date of birth: 5 August 1981 (age 45)
- Position: Defender

Team information
- Current team: Lautoka FC.
- Number: 12

Senior career*
Years	Team	Apps	(Gls)
2005–2007	Ba		
2007–2008	YoungHeart Manawatu	14	(0)
2008–2011	Lautoka		
2011–2014	Ba		
2014–2018	Lautoka FC		

International career
2003–2008	Fiji	13	(1)
Medal record
Men's football
Representing Fiji
OFC Nations Cup
Third place	2008 Oceania
Pacific Games
Silver medal – second place	2007 Samoa
- * Club domestic league appearances and goals

Peni Finau (born 5 August 1981), originally known as Peni Lesubulamailepanoni, is a Fiji football defender currently playing for Fijian football club Ba F.C.

== International career ==
Finau made his debut for Fiji at the South Pacific Games 2003 and played for the team in the 2010 FIFA World Cup qualification tournament. He is the brother of Osea Vakatalesau, who also plays for Ba F.C.

== Career statistics ==
=== International ===
Appearances and goals by national team and year
National team	Year	Apps	Goals
Fiji	2003	5	0
Fiji	2004	–	
Fiji	2005	–	
Fiji	2006	–	
Fiji	2007	7	1
Fiji	2008	1	0
Total		13	1

Scores and results list Fiji's goal tally first, score column indicates score after each Finau goal.

List of international goals scored by Peni Finau
No.	Date	Venue	Opponent	Score	Result	Competition
1	25 August 2007	Toleafoa J.S. Blatter Complex, Apia, Samoa	Tuvalu	13–0	16–0	2007 South Pacific Games

== Honours ==
=== Player ===
Fiji

- OFC Nations Cup: 3rd place, 2008
- Pacific Games: Silver Medalist, 2007

=== Individual ===
- 2015 Fiji Football Association Cup Tournament Golden Boot
