= Lafaele Moala =

Tongan footballer

Personal information
- Full name: Lafaele Moala
- Date of birth: 22 July 1982 (age 44)
- Place of birth: Tonga
- Position: Attacking midfielder

Senior career*
Years	Team	Apps	(Gls)
2003–2015	Lotoha'apai United		
2015–2017	Veitongo		
2026–	Nukuhetulu		

International career^{‡}
2003–2012	Tonga	16	(2)
- * Club domestic league appearances and goals as of 13 January 2012 ‡ National team caps and goals as of 10 September 2015

Lafaele Moala (born 22 July 1982) is a Tongan former footballer who played as an attacking midfielder. He represented the Tonga national football team.

Moala had a long career with Lotoha'apai United.

In 2012 he was appointed assistant coach of the Tonga national under-17 football team.

In 2018 he became a Sport for Development officer with the Just Play program helping disabled people play sport.

== International career ==
=== International goals ===
Scores and results list Tonga's goal tally first.

Goal	Date	Venue	Opponent	Score	Result	Competition
1.	1 September 2007	National Soccer Stadium, Apia, Samoa	American Samoa	1–0	4–0	2007 South Pacific Games
