= Osea Vakatalesau =

Fijian footballer (born 1986)

Personal information
- Full name: Osea Vakatalesau
- Date of birth: 15 January 1986 (age 40)
- Place of birth: Wailotua, Tailevu, Fiji
- Height: 1.92 m (6 ft 4 in)
- Position: Striker

Team information
- Current team: Nadroga
- Number: 15

Youth career
- –2004: Lautoka

Senior career*
Years	Team	Apps	(Gls)
2004–2005	Lautoka		
2006–2008	Ba		
2008	→ YoungHeart (loan)	13	(14)
2009–2010	Lautoka	1	(1)
2010–2011	Hekari United	20	(17)
2011–2014	Ba		
2014–2015	Amicale		
2016	Ba		
2017	Lautoka	65	(82)
2020—	Nadroga		

International career^{‡}
2005–2017	Fiji	19	(14)
Medal record
Men's football
Representing Fiji
OFC U-20 Championship
Runner-up	2002 Fiji/Vanuatu
Pacific Games
Silver medal – second place	2007 Samoa
- * Club domestic league appearances and goals as of 27 August 2015 ‡ National team caps and goals as of 27 September 2014

Osea Vakatalesau (born 15 January 1986) is a Fijian footballer who plays for Nadroga.

== International career ==
Nicknamed Ozzy, he participated in South Pacific Games 2007 (where he was the tournament's top goalscorer with 10 goals) and the 2010 FIFA World Cup qualification tournament where he scored numerous goals for his country. He was the joint top goalscorer of the 2010 FIFA World Cup qualifying campaign with 12 goals along with Burkina Faso striker Moumouni Dagano.

== Career statistics ==
=== International goals ===
No.	Date	Venue	Opponent	Score	Result	Competition
1.	25 August 2007	Toleafoa J.S. Blatter Complex, Apia, Samoa	Tuvalu	16–0	Win	2007 South Pacific Games
2.	25 August 2007	Toleafoa J.S. Blatter Complex, Apia, Samoa	Tuvalu	16–0	Win	2007 South Pacific Games
3.	25 August 2007	Toleafoa J.S. Blatter Complex, Apia, Samoa	Tuvalu	16–0	Win	2007 South Pacific Games
4.	25 August 2007	Toleafoa J.S. Blatter Complex, Apia, Samoa	Tuvalu	16–0	Win	2007 South Pacific Games
5.	25 August 2007	Toleafoa J.S. Blatter Complex, Apia, Samoa	Tuvalu	16–0	Win	2007 South Pacific Games
6.	25 August 2007	Toleafoa J.S. Blatter Complex, Apia, Samoa	Tuvalu	16–0	Win	2007 South Pacific Games
7.	27 August 2007	Toleafoa J.S. Blatter Complex, Apia, Samoa	Cook Islands	4–0	Win	2007 South Pacific Games
8.	1 September 2007	Toleafoa J.S. Blatter Complex, Apia, Samoa	Tahiti	0–4	Win	2007 South Pacific Games
9.	1 September 2007	Toleafoa J.S. Blatter Complex, Apia, Samoa	Tahiti	0–4	Win	2007 South Pacific Games
10.	5 September 2007	Toleafoa J.S. Blatter Complex, Apia, Samoa	Vanuatu	3–0	Win	2007 South Pacific Games
11.	17 November 2007	Govind Park, Ba, Fiji	New Caledonia	3–3	Draw	2008 OFC Nations Cup
12.	17 November 2007	Govind Park, Ba, Fiji	New Caledonia	3–3	Draw	2008 OFC Nations Cup
13.	19 August 2015	Govind Park, Ba, Fiji	Tonga	5–0	Win	Friendly
14.	27 August 2015	Prince Charles Park, Nadi, Fiji	American Samoa	6–0	Win	Friendly
15.	27 August 2015	Prince Charles Park, Nadi, Fiji	American Samoa	6–0	Win	Friendly
Correct as of 28 August 2015

== Honours ==
Ba

- League Championship (districts): 2006
- Inter-District Championship: 2005, 2007
- Battle of the Giants: 2007
- Fiji Cup: 2007

Fiji

- Pacific Games: Silver Medalist, 2007

Fiji U20

- OFC U-20 Championship: Runner-Up, 2002
