= Stanley Waita =

Solomon Islands former footballer

Personal information
- Full name: Stanley Waita
- Date of birth: October 10, 1978 (age 48)
- Place of birth: Honiara, NRH, Solomon Islands
- Position: Midfielder

Team information
- Current team: Hana FC
- Number: 20

Senior career*
Years	Team	Apps	(Gls)
2002	Malaita Eagles		
2003–2004	Naha F.C.		
2005–2006	Agfa Hana		
2006–2008	Waikato FC	30	(2)
2007	→ Ngaruawahia United (loan)		
2008	Honiara Warriors		
2009–2010	Hekari United		
2010–2011	Amicale F.C.		
2012	Hana FC		

International career^{‡}
2000–2007	Solomon Islands	31	(5)

Managerial career
- 2017: Solomon Islands (assistant)
- 2018: Solomon Islands U17
Medal record
Men's football
Representing Solomon Islands
OFC Nations Cup
Runner-up	2004 Australia
Third place	2000 Tahiti
- * Club domestic league appearances and goals as of 17 July 2010 ‡ National team caps and goals as of 24 January 2018

Stanley Waita (born 10 October 1979 in Auki) is a retired Solomon Islands footballer who played as a midfielder. Since January 2018 he is the head coach of the Solomon Islands under-17.

== Club career ==
Waita played in the Central League for Wairarapa United in 2006. The Solomon Islands midfielder transferred to Ngaruawahia United where he played a key role in the club's promotion charge scoring ten goals in eleven matches for the club. Waita played in the ASB Premiership for Waikato FC and completed the 2007-2008 Lotto Sport Italia NRFL Division 1 seasons with Ngaruawahia United.

Waita returned to the Solomon Islands in mid-2008 before joining Papua New Guineans Hekari in 2009. In May 2010, he won the Oceania Champions League with Hekari United.

== International career ==
He has also represented the senior Solomon Islands national football team, making his debut in 2000 and collecting over 30 caps since.

== Career statistics ==
=== International ===
Appearances and goals by national team and year
National team	Year	Apps	Goals
Solomon Islands	2000	3	0
Solomon Islands	2001	3	1
Solomon Islands	2002	3	0
Solomon Islands	2003	4	1
Solomon Islands	2004	10	1
Solomon Islands	2005	2	0
Solomon Islands	2007	6	2
Total		31	5

Scores and results list Solomon Island's goal tally first, score column indicates score after each Waita goal.

List of international goals scored by Stanley Waita
No.	Date	Venue	Opponent	Score	Result	Competition	Ref.
1	8 June 2001	North Harbour Stadium, North Shore, New Zealand	Vanuatu	4–1	7–2	2002 FIFA World Cup qualification	
2	3 July 2003	ANZ Stadium, Suva, Fiji	Kiribati	1–0	7–0	2003 South Pacific Games	
3	12 May 2005	Lawson Tama Stadium, Honiara, Solomon Islands	Cook Islands	1–0	5–0	2006 FIFA World Cup qualification	
4	25 August 2007	National Soccer Stadium, Apia, Samoa	American Samoa	6–1	12–1	2010 FIFA World Cup qualification	
5	25 August 2007	National Soccer Stadium, Apia, Samoa	American Samoa	11–1	12–1	2010 FIFA World Cup qualification	

== Honours ==
Hekari United

- OFC Champions League: 2009-10

Solomon Islands

- OFC Nations Cup: Runner-up, 2004; 3rd place 2000
