= Esala Masi =

Fijian footballer

Personal information
- Full name: Esala Masinisau
- Date of birth: 9 March 1974 (age 52)
- Place of birth: Ba, Fiji
- Height: 1.78 m (5 ft 10 in)
- Positions: Midfielder; striker

Youth career
- Ba

Senior career*
Years	Team	Apps	(Gls)
1996–1997	Gippsland Falcons	28	(6)
1997–2000	Wollongong Wolves	77	(19)
2000–2004	Newcastle United	96	(18)
2004	South Cardiff Gunners		
2004–2005	Sydney Olympic		
2005	→ Johor FC (loan)		
2005	Ba		
2006	Navua		
2006–2007	Oakleigh Cannons	53	(27)
2008	Frankston Pines	7	(1)
2008	Altona Magic	17	(7)
2009	Pine Rivers United		
2010–2013	Mitchelton FC		

International career
1997–2005	Fiji	34	(31)

Managerial career
- 2015–: Mitchelton FC (reserves)
Medal record
Men's football
Representing Fiji
OFC Nations Cup
Third place	1998 Australia
Pacific Games
Gold medal – first place	2003 Fiji
- * Club domestic league appearances and goals

Esala Masi (born 9 March 1974) is a retired Fijian footballer, who played as a striker.

== Club career ==
Masi began his football career at his hometown club Ba before he signed with National Soccer League (NSL) club Gippsland Falcons in January 1996. The next year, Masi transferred to Wollongong Wolves and helped them win the 1999-2000 NSL title. He spent three seasons at Wollongong, gaining 77 appearances and 19 goals.

After the NSL was disbanded in 2004, he played for several teams in Australia's state league and Malaysia.

In 2006, Masi joined National Premier Leagues Victoria side Oakleigh Cannons FC. In the 2007 season, he finished as the top scorer of the league, scoring 15 goals.

In December 2008, Masi played against LA Galaxy in an exhibition match in New Zealand as part of an Oceania XI All-Star team.

In December 2015, Masi was appointed the coach of Mitchelton FC reserve team.

== International career ==
Masi played international football for Fiji at Under-15, Under-20 and Under-23 levels. He made his full international debut on 7 June 1997 in a 1–0 loss against New Zealand in qualification for the 1998 FIFA World Cup. However, his international career is not well documented. Therefore, his exact appearances and goals totals are unknown. According to an interview he gave to Queensland Soccer News, he appeared over 50 times for Fiji, and also won two Melanesia Cups.

He was also captain for Fiji during the 2003 South Pacific Games. In the gold-medal match against New Caledonia, he scored Fiji's second goal from a 35-metre free-kick in a 2–0 victory. Fiji won the gold medal with Masi finishing as the tournament's top scorer with eleven goals.

=== International goals ===
Scores and results list Fiji's goal tally first.

List of international goals scored by Esala Masi
No.	Date	Venue	Opponent	Score	Result	Competition	Ref
1.	15 June 1997	National Stadium, Suva, Fiji	Papua New Guinea	2–0	3–1	1998 FIFA World Cup qualification	
2.	25 September 1998	Suncorp Stadium, Brisbane, Australia	Australia	1–3	1–3	1998 OFC Nations Cup	
3.	4 October 1998	Suncorp Stadium, Brisbane, Australia	Tahiti	1–0	4–2	1998 OFC Nations Cup	
4.	4 October 1998	Suncorp Stadium, Brisbane, Australia	Tahiti	3–0	4–2	1998 OFC Nations Cup	
5.	8 April 2000	National Stadium, Suva, Fiji	Papua New Guinea	3–0	5–0	2000 Melanesia Cup	
6.	11 April 2000	National Stadium, Suva, Fiji	Vanuatu	Unknown	4–1	2000 Melanesia Cup	
7.	11 April 2000	National Stadium, Suva, Fiji	Vanuatu	Unknown	4–1	2000 Melanesia Cup	
8.	9 February 2001	Govind Park, Ba, Fiji	Malaysia	Unknown	1–2	Friendly	
9.	7 April 2001	International Sports Stadium, Coffs Harbour, Australia	American Samoa	1–0	13–0	2002 FIFA World Cup qualification	
10.	7 April 2001	International Sports Stadium, Coffs Harbour, Australia	American Samoa	2–0	13–0	2002 FIFA World Cup qualification	
11.	7 April 2001	International Sports Stadium, Coffs Harbour, Australia	American Samoa	9–0	13–0	2002 FIFA World Cup qualification	
12.	7 April 2001	International Sports Stadium, Coffs Harbour, Australia	American Samoa	10–0	13–0	2002 FIFA World Cup qualification	
13.	16 April 2001	International Sports Stadium, Coffs Harbour, Australia	Tonga	2–0	8–1	2002 FIFA World Cup qualification	
14.	16 April 2001	International Sports Stadium, Coffs Harbour, Australia	Tonga	4–0	8–1	2002 FIFA World Cup qualification	
15.	16 April 2001	International Sports Stadium, Coffs Harbour, Australia	Tonga	5–0	8–1	2002 FIFA World Cup qualification	
16.	16 April 2001	International Sports Stadium, Coffs Harbour, Australia	Tonga	8–1	8–1	2002 FIFA World Cup qualification	
17.	1 July 2003	National Stadium, Suva, Fiji	Tuvalu	1–0	4–0	2003 South Pacific Games	
18.	1 July 2003	National Stadium, Suva, Fiji	Tuvalu	2–0	4–0	2003 South Pacific Games	
19.	5 July 2003	Ratu Cakobau Park, Nausori, Fiji	Kiribati	2–0	12–0	2003 Pacific Games	
20.	5 July 2003	Ratu Cakobau Park, Nausori, Fiji	Kiribati	5–0	12–0	2003 Pacific Games	
21.	5 July 2003	Ratu Cakobau Park, Nausori, Fiji	Kiribati	6–0	12–0	2003 Pacific Games	
22.	5 July 2003	Ratu Cakobau Park, Nausori, Fiji	Kiribati	7–0	12–0	2003 Pacific Games	
23.	5 July 2003	Ratu Cakobau Park, Nausori, Fiji	Kiribati	8–0	12–0	2003 Pacific Games	
24.	5 July 2003	Ratu Cakobau Park, Nausori, Fiji	Kiribati	9–0	12–0	2003 Pacific Games	
25.	5 July 2003	Ratu Cakobau Park, Nausori, Fiji	Kiribati	10–0	12–0	2003 Pacific Games	
26.	7 July 2003	Churchill Park, Lautoka, Fiji	Solomon Islands	2–0	2–1	2003 Pacific Games	
27.	11 July 2003	National Stadium, Suva, Fiji	New Caledonia	2–0	2–0	2003 Pacific Games	
28.	15 May 2004	Toleafoa J.S. Blatter Complex, Apia, Samoa	American Samoa	8–0	11–0	2006 FIFA World Cup qualification	
29.	17 May 2004	Toleafoa J.S. Blatter Complex, Apia, Samoa	Samoa	3–0	4–0	2006 FIFA World Cup qualification	
30.	12 August 2005	Churchill Park, Lautoka, Fiji	India	1–0	1–0	Friendly	
31.	14 August 2005	National Stadium, Suva, Fiji	India	2–1	2–1	Friendly	

== Personal life ==
His uncle, the late Esala Masi Sr. was also a Fiji international football player in the 1960s; he died in 2010. His cousin, Manoa Masi has also played in Australia and the national team.

== Honours ==
Wollongong Wolves

- National Soccer League: 1999–2000

Altona Magic

- National Premier Leagues Victoria: 2008

Mitchelton FC

- Capital League 1: 2013

Fiji

- OFC Nations Cup: 3rd place, 1998
- Pacific Games: Gold Medalist, 2003

Individual

- Pacific Games Golden Boot: 2003
- National Premier Leagues Victoria Golden Boot: 2007
