= 2000 Melanesia Cup =

Tournament details
- Host country: Fiji
- Dates: 8–15 April
- Teams: 5 (from 1 confederation)

Final positions
- Champions: Fiji (5th title)
- Runners-up: Solomon Islands
- Third place: Vanuatu

Tournament statistics
- Matches played: 10
- Goals scored: 50 (5 per match)

The Melanesia Cup 2000 was the seventh and the last Melanesia-wide tournament ever held. It took place in Fiji and five teams participated: Fiji, Solomon Islands, New Caledonia, Papua New Guinea and Vanuatu and served for the third time as an OFC Nations Cup qualifier.

The teams played each other according to a round-robin format with Fiji winning the tournament for the fifth time and qualifying to the Oceania Nations Cup 2000 along with Solomon Islands. However, 3rd place Vanuatu replaced Fiji at the latter Cup due to civil unrest in Fiji following a coup by George Speight, who overthrew Fiji's democratically elected government.

== Results ==
Pos	Team	Pld	W	D	L	GF	GA	GD	Pts	Qualification
1	Fiji (Note: Fiji withdrew for the 2000 OFC Nations Cup because of political unrest in the country, which led to the 2000 Fijian coup d'état.) (C, H)	4	3	1	0	13	4	+9	10	
2	Solomon Islands	4	2	1	1	10	9	+1	7	Qualify for 2000 OFC Nations Cup
3	Vanuatu	4	2	0	2	12	7	+5	6	Qualify for 2000 OFC Nations Cup
4	New Caledonia	4	2	0	2	11	11	0	6	
5	Papua New Guinea	4	0	0	4	4	19	−15	0	

(C) Champions; (H) Hosts
Notes:
8 April 2000

Fiji	5–0	Papua New Guinea
Manoa Masi; Marika Namaqa; Esala Masi; Emoel B K Doidoi

Suva, Fiji
8 April 2000

New Caledonia	4–2	Solomon Islands
Didler W Marius M Steve L J Pibee		Batram Suri; Noel Berry

Suva, Fiji

10 April 2000

Solomon Islands	2–1	Vanuatu
Noel Berry; Patteson Daudau		V Noel

Suva, Fiji
10 April 2000

Fiji	2–1	New Caledonia
Manoa Masi; A Driu		Didier W

Suva, Fiji

11 April 2000

New Caledonia	6–1	Papua New Guinea
W Didler; M Patrice; M Marius; F Yues; P Joris; E Alexander		S Mali

Suva, Fiji
11 April 2000

Fiji	4–1	Vanuatu
Esala Masinisau 2'; B Lorima 2'		Richard Iwai

Suva, Fiji

13 April 2000

Vanuatu	6–0	New Caledonia
C Seimata; Hubert Reuben; Richard Iwai 2 H George 2

Suva, Fiji
13 April 2000

Solomon Islands	4–2	Papua New Guinea
Jack Samani; Noel Berry; Patteson Daudau 2		L Isalah; E Geoferey

Suva, Fiji

15 April 2000

Papua New Guinea	1–4	Vanuatu
P Paliwa		C Berry; N Vari 2 Hubert Reuben

Suva, Fiji
15 April 2000

Fiji	2–2	Solomon Islands
Emosi Baleinuku; A Driu		Batram Suri; Patteson Daudau

Suva, Fiji

Solomon Islands and Vanuatu* qualified for Oceania Nations Cup 2000

- Fiji were replaced by Vanuatu (due to civil unrest taking place in Fiji).
