= Kunda Tom =

Cook Islands footballer

Personal information
- Full name: Kundamundi Ka'Fiatu Hohepa Tom
- Date of birth: 14 July 1986 (age 40)
- Place of birth: Mangarei Village, Mitiaro, Cook Islands
- Height: 5 ft 7 in (1.70 m)
- Position: Forward

International career
Years	Team	Apps	(Gls)
2007	Cook Islands	1	(1)

Kundamundi Ka'Fiatu Hohepa "Kunda" Tom (born 14 July 1986) is a semi-professional Cook Islander footballer. He has been capped seven times by the Cook Islands, scoring once.

== International career ==
Tom appeared six times on the Cook Islands national team, including a 2010 FIFA World Cup Qualifying match against Tuvalu in which he scored.

== Career statistics ==
=== International ===
Appearances and goals by national team and year
National team	Year	Apps	Goals
Cook Islands	2007	1	1
Total		1	1

Scores and results list the Cook Islands' goal tally first, score column indicates score after each Tom goal.

List of international goals scored by Kunda Tom
No.	Date	Venue	Opponent	Score	Result	Competition
1	1 September 2007	National Soccer Stadium, Apia, Samoa	Tuvalu	4–1	4–1	2007 South Pacific Games
