= Geoffrey Gete =

Vanuatuan footballer

Personal information
- Full name: Geoffrey Lego Gete
- Date of birth: 3 August 1986 (age 40)
- Place of birth: Espiritu Santo, Vanuatu
- Position: Central defender

Senior career*
Years	Team	Apps	(Gls)
2004–2006	Sia-Raga F.C.		
2007–2013	Tafea F.C.		

International career^{‡}
2004–2008	Vanuatu	19	(1)
Medal record
Men's football
Representing Vanuatu
Pacific Games
Bronze medal – third place	2007 Samoa
- * Club domestic league appearances and goals as of 4 June 2018 ‡ National team caps and goals as of 4 June 2018

Geoffrey Gete (born 3 August 1986 in Espiritu Santo, Vanuatu) is a footballer who plays as a defender. He currently plays for Tafea F.C. in the Vanuatu Premia Divisen and the Vanuatu national football team.

== Honours ==
Vanuatu

- Pacific Games: Bronze Medalist, 2007
