= Seule Soromon =

Vanuatuan footballer

Personal information
- Full name: Seule Soromon
- Date of birth: 14 August 1984 (age 42)
- Place of birth: Mele, Efate, Vanuatu
- Position: Striker

Team information
- Current team: Wairarapa United

Senior career*
Years	Team	Apps	(Gls)
2007	Suva		
2008	Wairarapa United		
2008–2009	Hawke's Bay United	14	(6)
2009–2012	YoungHeart Manawatu	47	(24)
2013–	Wairarapa United		

International career^{‡}
2007–	Vanuatu	8	(10)
Medal record
Men's football
Representing Vanuatu
Pacific Games
Bronze medal – third place	2007 Samoa
- * Club domestic league appearances and goals as of 3 February 2017 ‡ National team caps and goals as of 30 April 2013

Seule Soromon (born 14 August 1984) is an association football striker from Vanuatu who currently plays for Wairarapa United in the Central Premier League.

He hails from Mele, which is located northwest of Port Vila.

== Club career ==
The prolific Soromon played for Suva F.C. in Fiji and for New Zealand Central Premier League side Wairarapa United. In October 2008, he trained with NZFC side Team Wellington but then joined fellow NZFC outfit Hawke's Bay United. He signed up with Manawatu for the 2009–10 season to form an all South Pacific strikeforce with Samoan striker Desmond Fa'aiuaso.

He ended that season as the league's top goalscorer with 11 goals from only 12 matches.

== International career ==
He made his debut for the Vanuatu national football team in an August 2007 World Cup qualification match against Samoa. He scored four goals in his second international, against American Samoa.

Scores and results list Vanuatu's goal tally first, score column indicates score after each Soromon goal.

List of international goals scored by Seule Soromon
No.	Date	Venue	Opponent	Score	Result	Competition	Ref.
1	17 July 2007	Stade Numa-Daly, Nouméa, New Caledonia	New Caledonia	3-5	3-5	Friendly	
2	25 August 2007	National Soccer Stadium, Apia, Samoa	Samoa	4-0	4-0	2007 South Pacific Games	
3	29 August 2007	National Soccer Stadium, Apia, Samoa	American Samoa	11-0	15-0	2007 South Pacific Games	
4	29 August 2007	National Soccer Stadium, Apia, Samoa	American Samoa	12-0	15-0	2007 South Pacific Games	
5	29 August 2007	National Soccer Stadium, Apia, Samoa	American Samoa	13-0	15-0	2007 South Pacific Games	
6	29 August 2007	National Soccer Stadium, Apia, Samoa	American Samoa	15-0	15-0	2007 South Pacific Games	
7	3 September 2007	National Soccer Stadium, Apia, Samoa	Tonga	1-0	4-1	2007 South Pacific Games	
8	3 September 2007	National Soccer Stadium, Apia, Samoa	Tonga	2-0	4-1	2007 South Pacific Games	
9	3 September 2007	National Soccer Stadium, Apia, Samoa	Tonga	3-0	4-1	2007 South Pacific Games	
10	7 September 2007	National Soccer Stadium, Apia, Samoa	Solomon Islands	1-0	2-0	2007 South Pacific Games	

== Honours ==
Vanuatu

- Pacific Games: Bronze Medalist, 2007,
