= Pierre Wajoka =

New Caledonian footballer (born 1978)

Personal information
- Date of birth: 19 December 1978 (age 47)
- Place of birth: Nouméa, New Caledonia
- Position: Midfielder

Team information
- Current team: New Caledonia U20 (Head Coach)

Senior career*
Years	Team	Apps	(Gls)
1995–2006	AS Magenta		
2006–2007	AS Lössi		
2007–2010	AS Magenta		
2011–2014	Gaïtcha FCN		
2014	AS Magenta		
2014–2015	Gaïtcha FCN		
2016	AS Magenta		

International career^{‡}
2003–2011	New Caledonia	39	(14)

Managerial career
- 2014: New Caledonia (assistant)
- 2014: New Caledonia U23 (assistant)
- 2016–2022: Magenta (assistant)
- 2021–: New Caledonia U20
- 2023–: Magenta
Medal record
Men's football
Representing New Caledonia
OFC Nations Cup
Runner-up	2008 Oceania
Pacific Games
Gold medal – first place	2007 Samoa
Gold medal – first place	2011 New Caledonia
Silver medal – second place	2003 Fiji
- * Club domestic league appearances and goals as of 15 November 2007 ‡ National team caps and goals as of 9 September 2011

Pierre Wajoka (born 19 December 1978) is a retired New Caledonian footballer who played as a midfielder and is currently the head coach of New Caledonia U20 national team.

== Playing career ==
He played one year for AS Lössi, the club representing his custom area. In 2011, he moved to Gaïtcha FCN. He is known for scoring the first ever goal in the 2010 FIFA World Cup qualification process against Tahiti on 25 August 2007.

He was part of the team which won the 2007 South Pacific Games. He also participated in the 2003 South Pacific Games, where New Caledonia won their group and reached the final of the competition, but were defeated by Fiji.

== Career statistics ==
=== International ===
Appearances and goals by national team and year
National team	Year	Apps	Goals
New Caledonia	2003	6	3
New Caledonia	2004	4	3
New Caledonia	2007	9	4
New Caledonia	2008	8	3
New Caledonia	2010	3	0
New Caledonia	2011	9	0
Total		39	13

Scores and results list New Caledonia's goal tally first, score column indicates score after each Wajoka goal.

List of international goals scored by Pierre Wajoka
No.	Date	Venue	Opponent	Score	Result	Competition	Ref.
1	1 July 2003	ANZ Stadium, Suva, Fiji	Federated States of Micronesia	4–0	18–0	2003 South Pacific Games	
2	1 July 2003	ANZ Stadium, Suva, Fiji	Federated States of Micronesia	11–0	18–0	2003 South Pacific Games	
3	1 July 2003	ANZ Stadium, Suva, Fiji	Federated States of Micronesia	18–0	18–0	2003 South Pacific Games	
4	17 May 2004	Lawson Tama Stadium, Honiara, Solomon Islands	Cook Islands	1–0	8–0	2006 FIFA World Cup qualification	
5	19 May 2005	Lawson Tama Stadium, Honiara, Solomon Islands	Tonga	5–0	8–0	2006 FIFA World Cup qualification	
6	19 May 2005	Lawson Tama Stadium, Honiara, Solomon Islands	Tonga	6–0	8–0	2006 FIFA World Cup qualification	
7	17 July 2007	Stade Numa-Daly, Nouméa, New Caledonia	Vanuatu	5–1	5–3	Friendly	
8	25 August 2007	National Soccer Stadium, Apia, Samoa	Tahiti	1–0	1–0	2010 FIFA World Cup qualification	
9	3 September 2007	National Soccer Stadium, Apia, Samoa	Fiji	1–0	1–1	2010 FIFA World Cup qualification	
10	21 November 2007	Stade Numa-Daly, Nouméa, New Caledonia	Fiji	1–0	4–0	2010 FIFA World Cup qualification	
11	20 June 2008	Stade Numa-Daly, Nouméa, New Caledonia	Vanuatu	1–0	3–0	2010 FIFA World Cup qualification	
12	3 October 2008	Stade Marville, La Courneuve, France	Mayotte	1–2	3–2	2008 Coupe de l'Outre-Mer	
13	3 October 2008	Stade Marville, La Courneuve, France	Mayotte	3–2	3–2	2008 Coupe de l'Outre-Mer	

== Honours ==
New Caledonia

- OFC Nations Cup: Runner-up, 2008
- Pacific Games: Gold Medalist, 2007, 2011; Silver Medalist, 2003
