= David Taro =

Solomon Island footballer

Personal information
- Date of birth: July 6, 1984 (age 42)
- Place of birth: Honiara, Solomon Islands
- Position: Right back

International career
Years	Team	Apps	(Gls)
2007–	Solomon Islands	6	(0)

David Taro is a Solomon Islands soccer defender. He usually played as a right back. He was part of 2010 FIFA World Cup qualifiers.

He played for Honiara Rangers F.C. from 2007 to 2010; and for Hekari United F.C., based in Port Moresby, Papua New Guinea, from July 2010 to June 2011.
