= Mele (name) =

Mele is a given name or surname. Notable people with the name include:

== Surname ==
- Mele (surname)

== Given name ==
- Mélé Temguia (born 1995), Canadian soccer player
- Mele Tuilotolava, Tongan-New Zealand lawyer
- Mele "Mel" Vojvodich (1929–2003), American aviator
