= Salesh Kumar =

Fijian footballer

Personal information
- Full name: Salesh Kumar
- Date of birth: 28 July 1981 (age 45)
- Place of birth: Rotuma, Fiji
- Height: 1.84 m (6 ft 0 in)
- Position: Midfielder

Team information
- Current team: Franklin United
- Number: 15

Senior career*
Years	Team	Apps	(Gls)
2002	Nadi F.C.		
2003	Olympians		
2004–2005	Ba F.C.		
2005–2006	Waitakere United		
2007	Central United		
2008–2009	Auckland City	15	(1)
2009–	Lautoka F.C.	3	(0)
2011–	Three Kings United		

International career^{‡}
2003–	Fiji	21	(2)
Medal record
Men's football
Representing Fiji
OFC Nations Cup
Third place	2008 Oceania
Pacific Games
Gold medal – first place	2003 Fiji
Silver medal – second place	2007 Samoa
- * Club domestic league appearances and goals as of 10 April 2009 ‡ National team caps and goals as of 14 April 2008

Salesh Kumar (born 28 July 1981) is a Fijian football midfielder who currently plays for Franklin United in the Northern League (New Zealand).

== International career ==
Kumar made his debut for Fiji at the South Pacific Games 2003 and he has played for them in the 2010 FIFA World Cup qualification tournament.

== Honours ==
Fiji

- OFC Nations Cup: 3rd place, 2008
- Pacific Games: Gold Medalist, 2003; Silver Medalist, 2007
