= José Hmaé =

New Caledonian footballer (born 1978)

Personal information
- Date of birth: 5 March 1978 (age 48)
- Position: Striker

Team information
- Current team: AS Pirae

Senior career*
Years	Team	Apps	(Gls)
2003–	AS Pirae		

International career
2004–	New Caledonia		
Medal record
Men's football
Representing New Caledonia
Pacific Games
Gold medal – first place	2007 Samoa
- * Club domestic league appearances and goals

José Hmaé (born March 5, 1978) is a football striker from New Caledonia. He currently plays for AS Pirae.

He scored a winning goal in the game versus Fiji national football team in the final of the 2007 South Pacific Games.

== Honours ==
- Pacific Games: Gold Medalist, 2007
