= Meles =

Meles may refer to:

- Meles (genus), a genus of badgers
- Meles of Lydia, a king of Lydia
- Meles Zenawi, prime minister of Ethiopia
- River Meles, which flowed through ancient Smyrna
- Meles, boy from Greek mythology, courted by Timagoras
