= Yohann Mercier =

New Caledonian footballer (born 1980)

Personal information
- Full name: Yohann Laurent Mercier
- Date of birth: 15 December 1980 (age 45)
- Place of birth: Baco, New Caledonia
- Position: Midfielder

Team information
- Current team: Hienghène Sport
- Number: 34

Senior career*
Years	Team	Apps	(Gls)
2006–2007	JS Baco	8	(0)
2007–2012	ACB Poya	50	(23)
2012–	Hienghène Sport	12	(2)

International career
2007–2016	New Caledonia	16	(1)
Medal record
Men's football
Representing New Caledonia
OFC Nations Cup
Runner-up	2008 Oceania
Pacific Games
Gold medal – first place	2007 Samoa
- * Club domestic league appearances and goals

Yohann Laurent Mercier (born 15 December 1980) is a footballer from New Caledonia. He plays as a Defence and has played football with ACB Poya since 2007. He previously played for JS Baco.

== Honours ==
New Caledonia

- OFC Nations Cup: Runner-up 2008
- Pacific Games: Gold Medalist, 2007
