= Malakai Tiwa =

Fijian footballer

Personal information
- Full name: Malakai Tiwa
- Date of birth: 3 October 1986 (age 40)
- Place of birth: Fiji
- Height: 1.72 m (5 ft 7 1/2 in)
- Position: Midfielder

Team information
- Current team: Ba
- Number: 16

Senior career*
Years	Team	Apps	(Gls)
2007–2010	Ba		
2010–2011	Hekari United		
2011–	Ba		

International career^{‡}
2007–	Fiji	19	(7)
Medal record
Men's football
Representing Fiji
OFC Nations Cup
Third place	2008 Oceania
Pacific Games
Silver medal – second place	2007 Samoa
- * Club domestic league appearances and goals as of 21 January 2012 ‡ National team caps and goals as of 8 June 2018

Malakai Tiwa (born 3 October 1986) in Fiji is a footballer who plays as a midfielder. He has previously played for Hekari United. He currently plays for Ba in the National Football League and the Fiji national football team.

== International career ==
=== International goals ===
Scores and results list Fiji's goal tally first.

No	Date	Venue	Opponent	Score	Result	Competition
1.	25 August 2007	National Soccer Stadium, Apia, Samoa	Tuvalu	6–0	16–0	2007 South Pacific Games
2.	25 August 2007	National Soccer Stadium, Apia, Samoa	Tuvalu	7–0	16–0	2007 South Pacific Games
3.	18 August 2011	ANZ National Stadium, Suva, Fiji	Samoa	4–1	5–1	Friendly
4.	18 August 2011	ANZ National Stadium, Suva, Fiji	Samoa	5–1	5–1	Friendly
5.	19 August 2011	Govind Park, Ba, Fiji	Tonga	1–0	5–0	Friendly
6.	19 August 2011	Govind Park, Ba, Fiji	Tonga	4–0	5–0	Friendly
7.	27 August 2015	Prince Charles Park, Nadi, Fiji	American Samoa	2–0	6–0	Friendly

== Honours ==
Fiji

- OFC Nations Cup: 3rd place, 2008
- Pacific Games: Silver Medalist, 2007
