= Football at the 2003 South Pacific Games – Men's tournament =

Football at the XII Pacific Games – Men
Tournament details
- Host country: Fiji
- Dates: 30 June – 11 July

Final positions
- Champions: Fiji (2nd title)
- Runners-up: New Caledonia
- Third place: Vanuatu
- Fourth place: Tahiti

Tournament statistics
- Matches played: 24
- Goals scored: 138 (5.75 per match)

Football was contested as part of the programme for the 2003 South Pacific Games which was hosted in Suva, Fiji from 28 June to 12 July 2003. It was the 11th edition of the men's football tournament at the multi-sport event organised by the Pacific Games Council and the first since 1995 after football was not included in the 1999 South Pacific Games programme due to issues over player registrations.

The football tournament began with the first matches of the group stage on 30 June 2003 and ended with the gold medal match on 11 July 2003. In a repeat of the 1963 final, hosts Fiji and New Caledonia contested the final. Fiji defeated New Caledonia 2–0 to win the gold medal for the second time. In the bronze medal match, Vanuatu defeated Tahiti 1–0.

== Background ==
Football had been part of the South Pacific Games programme following the debut of the men's competition at the inaugural 1963 South Pacific Games in Fiji. However, football was not included in the 1999 South Pacific Games programme due to player registration differences between the traditional system that had been used in previous South Pacific Games and the newly imposed Oceania Football Confederation (OFC) and Fédération Internationale de Football Association (FIFA) regulations which were brought in to try and make the tournament more formal.

Tahiti held the record for gold medals having won the football tournament five times. They were also the defending champions after defeating the Solomon Islands 2–0 as hosts in the gold medal match at the 1995 South Pacific Games.

== Format ==
A total of 10 teams took part in the competition. They were drawn into two single round robin groups of five teams. The group winners and runners-up would contest the semi-finals which would decide the teams contesting the gold and bronze medal matches.

=== Participants ===
- Federated States of Micronesia
- Fiji
- Kiribati
- New Caledonia
- Papua New Guinea
- Solomon Islands
- Tahiti
- Tonga
- Tuvalu
- Vanuatu

== Group stage ==
=== Group A ===
Fiji and Vanuatu advanced to the semi-finals.

==== Table ====
Pos	Team	Pld	W	D	L	GF	GA	GD	Pts	Qualification
1	Fiji	4	3	1	0	18	1	+17	10	Semi-finals
2	Vanuatu	4	2	2	0	21	2	+19	8	Semi-finals
3	Solomon Islands	4	2	1	1	14	4	+10	7	
4	Tuvalu	4	1	0	3	3	11	−8	3	
5	Kiribati	4	0	0	4	2	40	−38	0	

==== Matches ====
30 June 2003

Tuvalu	3–2	Kiribati
Manoa 3'; Fagota 75'; Semaia 81'		Nemeia 26', 46'

National Stadium, Suva
Referee: Harry Attison (Vanuatu)
30 June 2003

Fiji	0–0	Vanuatu

National Stadium, Suva
Referee: Charles Ariiotima (Tahiti)

1 July 2003

Fiji	4–0	Tuvalu
E. Masi 1', 15'; Kumar 38', 41'

National Stadium, Suva
Attendance: 3,000
Referee: Jimmy Wright (New Caledonia)
1 July 2003

Solomon Islands	2–2	Vanuatu
Menapi 49', 57'		Mermer 22'; Qorig 47'

National Stadium, Suva
Referee: Intaz Shah (Fiji)

3 July 2003

Solomon Islands	7–0	Kiribati
Waita 8'; Menapi 43', 48', 52', 55', 74'; Mehau 78'

National Stadium, Suva
Attendance: 700
Referee: Charles Ariiotima (Tahiti)
3 July 2003

Tuvalu	0–1	Vanuatu
		Tabe 86'

National Stadium, Suva
Attendance: 700
Referee: Gidas Bayung (Papua New Guinea)

5 July 2003

Tuvalu	0–4	Solomon Islands
		Maniadalo 16'; Menapi 27', 87'; Suri 80'

Ratu Cakobau Park, Nausori
Attendance: 2,500
Referee: Gidas Bayung (Papua New Guinea)
5 July 2003

Fiji	12–0	Kiribati
Vulivuli 7'; E. Masi 17', 31', 47', 48', 51', 54', 68'; Gataurua 28'; Rabo 33'; Rodu 88'; Baleinuku 89'

Ratu Cakobau Park, Nausori
Attendance: 4,000
Referee: Harry Attison (Vanuatu)

7 July 2003

Kiribati	0–18	Vanuatu
		Mermer 4', 15', 51', 53'; Chilia 10', 22', 29', 30'; Iwai 27', 40', 41', 63', 64'; Tabe 35'; Vava 47'; Thomsen 54'; Demas 62'; Pita 83'

Churchill Park, Lautoka
Attendance: 2,000
Referee: Gidas Bayung (Papua New Guinea)
7 July 2003

Fiji	2–1	Solomon Islands
Toma 4'; E. Masi 13'		Menapi 68'

Churchill Park, Lautoka
Attendance: 6,000
Referee: Charles Ariiotima (Tahiti)

=== Group B ===
New Caledonia and Tahiti advanced to the semi-finals.

==== Table ====
Pos	Team	Pld	W	D	L	GF	GA	GD	Pts	Qualification
1	New Caledonia	4	4	0	0	28	0	+28	12	Semi-finals
2	Tahiti	4	3	0	1	24	4	+20	9	Semi-finals
3	Papua New Guinea	4	1	1	2	12	7	+5	4	
4	Tonga	4	1	1	2	9	10	−1	4	
5	Federated States of Micronesia	4	0	0	4	0	52	−52	0	

==== Matches ====
30 June 2003

Tahiti	17–0	Federated States of Micronesia
Tagawa 8', 10', 19', 33'; Finay 17' (o.g.); Guyon 32', 41', 56'; Bennett 48', 70', 76', 86'; Tchen 69'; Papaura 71'; Senechal 72'; Fatupua-Lecaill 78'; Terevaura 81'

National Stadium, Suva
Referee: Leone Rakaroi (Fiji)
30 June 2003

Papua New Guinea	0–2	New Caledonia
		Djamali 69'; Hmae 81'

National Stadium, Suva
Referee: Intaz Shah (Fiji)

1 July 2003

Federated States of Micronesia	0–18	New Caledonia
		Hmae 3', 41', 49', 53'; Poatinda 8', 9', 29', 33', 66', 76'; Wajoka 15', 62', 85'; Elmour 16'; Joseph 71'; Jacques 78'; Theodore 80'; Jacky 84'

National Stadium, Suva
Attendance: 3,000
Referee: Andrew Moli (Solomon Islands)
1 July 2003

Papua New Guinea	2–2	Tonga
Sow 41'; Habuka 76'		Feao 62', 75'

National Stadium, Suva
Attendance: 3,000
Referee: Rajendra Singh (Fiji)

3 July 2003

Tonga	0–4	New Caledonia
		Djamali 10'; Dokunengo 38'; Cawa 54'; Kabeu 74'

National Stadium, Suva
Attendance: 700
Referee: Intaz Shah (Fiji)
3 July 2003

Tahiti	3–0	Papua New Guinea
Bennett 13', 69'; Tagawa 62'

National Stadium, Suva
Attendance: 1,000
Referee: Jimmy Wright (New Caledonia)

5 July 2003

Tonga	7–0	Federated States of Micronesia
Fonua 5'; Tevi 15'; Uhatai 22', 36'; Feao 34', 55'; Uele 72'

Ratu Cakobau Park, Nausori
Attendance: 1,000
Referee: Intaz Shah (Fiji)
5 July 2003

Tahiti	0–4	New Caledonia
		Lameu 10', 41'; Djamali 31'; Poatinda 88'

Ratu Cakobau Park, Nausori
Attendance: 3,000
Referee: Intaz Shah (Fiji)

7 July 2003

Tahiti	4–0	Tonga
Tagawa 2', 27'; Bennett 81', 83'

Churchill Park, Lautoka
Attendance: 3,000
Referee: Intaz Shah (Fiji)
7 July 2003

Papua New Guinea	10–0	Federated States of Micronesia
Davani 5', 6', 51'; Pomat 17', 37'; Foster 36'; Posman 67', 74'; Ire 79'; Lepani 90+2'

Churchill Park, Lautoka
Attendance: 3,500
Referee: Tammy Ogston (Australia)

== Semi-finals ==
After a 1–1 draw, Ratu Veresa Toma scored the golden goal as Fiji defeated Tahiti 2–1 to advance to the gold medal match. New Caledonia defeated Vanuatu 5–4 on penalties.

9 July 2003

Fiji	2–1 (a.s.d.e.t.)	Tahiti
Waqa 9'; Toma 106'		Papaura 4'

Churchill Park, Lautoka
Attendance: 8,000
Referee: Harry Attison (Vanuatu)

9 July 2003

New Caledonia	1–1 (a.s.d.e.t.)	Vanuatu
Kabeu 44'		Maki 54'
Penalties
	4–3

Churchill Park, Lautoka
Attendance: 7,000
Referee: Intaz Shah (Fiji)

== Bronze-medal match ==
Etienne Mermer scored the only goal of the match as Vanuatu won the bronze medal.

11 July 2003

Tahiti	0–1	Vanuatu
		Mermer 57'

National Stadium, Suva
Attendance: 6,000
Referee: Leone Rakaroi (Fiji)

== Gold-medal match ==
Goals from cousins Manoa and Esala Masi helped Fiji to win the gold medal by defeating New Caledonia 2–0.

11 July 2003

Fiji	2–0	New Caledonia
M. Masi 38'; E. Masi 63'

National Stadium, Suva
Attendance: 9,000
Referee: Harry Attison (Vanuatu)

== See also ==
- Football at the 2003 South Pacific Games – Women's tournament
- Pacific Games
