= Michel Hmaé =

New Caledonian footballer (born 1978

Personal information
- Date of birth: 21 March 1978 (age 48)
- Position: Striker

Senior career*
Years	Team	Apps	(Gls)
2002–2003	AS Pirae		(23)
2003–2009	AS Magenta		(12)
2010–2013	AS Mont-Dore	5	(2)
2013–2016	AS Magenta	2	(0)

International career^{‡}
2003–2011	New Caledonia	28	(22)
Medal record
Men's football
Representing New Caledonia
OFC Nations Cup
Runner-up	2008 Oceania
Pacific Games
Gold medal – first place	2011 New Caledonia
Silver medal – second place	2003 Fiji
- * Club domestic league appearances and goals as of 12 September 2012 ‡ National team caps and goals as of 7 September 2011

Michel Hmaé (born 21 March 1978) is a footballer who used to play for AS Magenta in the New Caledonian football league. He has been playing as a striker for the Noumea outfit since 2003–04. In January 2010, he signed for AS Mont-Dore.

Hmaé is regular in the New Caledonia national football team. At international level, Michel Hmaé scored 6 goals in the Oceania Nations Cup 2004, including 5 against the Cook Islands. In the South Pacific Games in 2003, he scored 4 goals against Micronesia.

Scores and results list New Caledonia's goal tally first, score column indicates score after each Hmaé goal.

List of international goals scored by Michel Hmaé
No.	Date	Venue	Opponent	Score	Result	Competition	Ref.
1	30 June 2003	HFC Bank Stadium, Suva, Fiji	Papua New Guinea	2-0	2-0	2003 South Pacific Games	
2	1 July 2003	HFC Bank Stadium, Suva, Fiji	Federated States of Micronesia	1-0	18-0	2003 South Pacific Games	
3	1 July 2003	HFC Bank Stadium, Suva, Fiji	Federated States of Micronesia	8-0	18-0	2003 South Pacific Games	
4	1 July 2003	HFC Bank Stadium, Suva, Fiji	Federated States of Micronesia	9-0	18-0	2003 South Pacific Games	
5	1 July 2003	HFC Bank Stadium, Suva, Fiji	Federated States of Micronesia	10-0	18-0	2003 South Pacific Games	
6	17 May 2004	Lawson Tama Stadium, Honiara, Solomon Islands	Cook Islands	2-0	8-0	2006 FIFA World Cup qualification	
7	17 May 2004	Lawson Tama Stadium, Honiara, Solomon Islands	Cook Islands	5-0	8-0	2006 FIFA World Cup qualification	
8	17 May 2004	Lawson Tama Stadium, Honiara, Solomon Islands	Cook Islands	6-0	8-0	2006 FIFA World Cup qualification	
9	17 May 2004	Lawson Tama Stadium, Honiara, Solomon Islands	Cook Islands	7-0	8-0	2006 FIFA World Cup qualification	
10	17 May 2004	Lawson Tama Stadium, Honiara, Solomon Islands	Cook Islands	8-0	8-0	2006 FIFA World Cup qualification	
11	19 May 2004	Lawson Tama Stadium, Honiara, Solomon Islands	Tonga	4-0	8-0	2006 FIFA World Cup qualification	
12	17 November 2007	Govind Park, Ba, Fiji	Fiji	3-3	3-3	2008 OFC Nations Cup	
13	21 November 2007	Stade Numa-Daly, Nouméa, New Caledonia	Fiji	2-0	4-0	2008 OFC Nations Cup	
14	21 November 2007	Stade Numa-Daly, Nouméa, New Caledonia	Fiji	3-0	4-0	2008 OFC Nations Cup	
15	20 June 2008	Stade Numa-Daly, Nouméa, New Caledonia	Vanuatu	2-0	3-0	2008 OFC Nations Cup	
16	6 September 2008	Stade Numa-Daly, Nouméa, New Caledonia	New Zealand	1-1	1-3	2008 OFC Nations Cup	
17	23 September 2010	Parc des Sports des Maisons Rouges, Val-de-Marne, France	Guadeloupe	1-0	1-1	2010 Coupe de l'Outre-Mer	
18	30 August 2011	Stade Rivière Salée, Nouméa, New Caledonia	Guam	8-0	9-0	2011 Pacific Games	
19	1 September 2011	Stade Rivière Salée, Nouméa, New Caledonia	Tuvalu	7-0	8-0	2011 Pacific Games	
20	1 September 2011	Stade Rivière Salée, Nouméa, New Caledonia	Tuvalu	8-0	8-0	2011 Pacific Games	
21	3 September 2011	Stade Rivière Salée, Nouméa, New Caledonia	American Samoa	8-0	8-0	2011 Pacific Games	
22	7 September 2011	Stade Yoshida, Koné, New Caledonia	Tahiti	3-1	3-1	2011 Pacific Games	

== Honours ==
=== Player ===
New Caledonia

- OFC Nations Cup: Runner-up, 2008
- Pacific Games: Gold Medalist, 2011 Silver Medalist, 2003

=== Individual ===
- Topscorer of Tahiti Ligue 1

2001-02 (23 Goals)

- Topscorer of New Caledonia Division Honneur

2006 (12 goals)
