= Chris Cahill =

Australian-Samoan footballer

Personal information
- Full name: Christopher Uli Cahill
- Date of birth: 25 December 1984 (age 41)
- Place of birth: Sydney, Australia
- Height: 5 ft 11 in (1.80 m)
- Position: Midfielder

Youth career
- Marconi-Fairfield

Senior career*
Years	Team	Apps	(Gls)
2004–2005	Dulwich Hill	10	(7)
2006–2012	St. George Saints		

International career^{‡}
2007–2011	Samoa	15	(7)
- * Club domestic league appearances and goals ‡ National team caps and goals as of January 2014

Christopher Cahill (born 25 December 1984) is a retired professional footballer. Born in Australia, he represented Samoa at international level.

== Club career ==
Cahill was born on Christmas Day 1984 in Sydney to a father of Irish descent and a Samoan mother. Cahill played four games for Dulwich Hill FC in 2004. He then moved to St. George Saints, where he played from 2006 to 2012.

== International career ==
He played for Samoa national football team and was briefly national team captain. He played in the 2010 FIFA World Cup Qualifiers, scoring twice against American Samoa. He did not appear at the 2012 OFC Nations Cup, which was Samoa's first appearance at a major tournament.

== Personal life ==
He is the brother of Australian international Tim Cahill, and cousin of Ben Roberts (New Zealand Kiwis), Joe Stanley (New Zealand All Blacks), and Jeremy Stanley (New Zealand All Blacks).
