= Stephen Willis (footballer) =

Cook Islands footballer

Personal information
- Full name: Stephen Willis
- Date of birth: 12 December 1986 (age 39)
- Place of birth: Cook Islands
- Position: Midfielder

Team information
- Current team: Nikao Sokattack

Senior career*
Years	Team	Apps	(Gls)
2005	Nikao Sokattack		

International career
2007	Cook Islands		
- * Club domestic league appearances and goals

Stephen Willis (born 12 December 1986) in the Cook Islands is a former footballer who played as a midfielder for Nikao Sokattack F.C. in the Cook Islands Round Cup. Willis works as a pilot for Air Rarotonga. He was selected for the Cook Islands national rugby sevens team for the 2023 Pacific Games in Honiara, and was one of two flag-bearers for the Cook Islands team at the opening ceremony.
