= Manoa Masi =

Fijian footballer

Personal information
- Full name: Manoa Raiyawa Masi
- Date of birth: 18 August 1974 (age 52)
- Place of birth: Fiji
- Position: Midfielder

Senior career*
Years	Team	Apps	(Gls)
1992–1994	Ba	10	(2)
1995–1997	Gippsland Falcons	9	(3)
1997–2001	Nadroga	13	(3)
2002–2011	Ba	12	(8)

International career^{‡}
1998–2003	Fiji	40	(19)
Medal record
Men's football
Representing Fiji
OFC Nations Cup
Third place	1998 Australia
Pacific Games
Gold medal – first place	2003 Fiji
- * Club domestic league appearances and goals as of 11 May 2007 ‡ National team caps and goals as of 11 May 2007

Manoa Masi (born 18 August 1974) is a former Fijian professional footballer who played as a midfielder.

Masi is a cousin of Fijian football star Esala Masi and they have played together in Australia and the national team. His father, the late Esala Masi Sr. was also a Fiji international football player in the 1960s; he died in Lautoka Hospital in 2010.

== International career ==
Masi made his debut for the Fiji national football team in 1998 against Australia and has collected over 15 caps.

== Honours ==
Fiji

- OFC Nations Cup: 3rd-place, 1998
- Pacific Games: Gold Medalist, 2003
