= Pita Bolatoga =

Fijian football player (born 1984)

Pita Bolatoga Senibiaukula (born 30 November 1984) is a Fijian football player. A midfielder, he has played for Labasa FC and Hekari United FC in Fiji. He was also on the Fiji national squad, participating in the South Pacific Games in 2007 and in Fiji's qualifying matches for the 2010 and 2012 World Cup.

== International goals ==
Scores and results list Fiji's goal tally first.

No	Date	Venue	Opponent	Score	Result	Competition
1.	25 August 2007	National Soccer Stadium, Apia, Samoa	Tuvalu	4–0	16–0	2007 South Pacific Games
2.	1 September 2007	National Soccer Stadium, Apia, Samoa	Tahiti	2–0	4–0	2007 South Pacific Games
3.	5 Sept 2007	National Soccer Stadium, Apia, Samoa	Vanuatu	1–0	3–0	2007 South Pacific Games
4.	13 July 2011	Subrail Park, Labasa, Fiji	Vanuatu	1–0	2–0	Friendly

== Honours ==
Fiji

- Pacific Games: Silver Medalist, 2007
