= Pita Rabo =

Fijian footballer

Personal information
- Full name: Pita Biri Rabo
- Date of birth: 30 July 1977 (age 49)
- Place of birth: Nausori, Fiji
- Position: Forward

Team information
- Current team: Suva
- Number: 7

Senior career*
Years	Team	Apps	(Gls)
2003–2006	Rewa		
2007–2011	Wairarapa United		
2011	Manawatu United		
2012	Wairarapa United		
2013–	Suva		

International career
1998–2007	Fiji	18	(5)
Medal record
Men's football
Representing Fiji
OFC Nations Cup
Third place	2008 Oceania
Pacific Games
Gold medal – first place	2003 Fiji
Silver medal – second place	2007 Samoa
- * Club domestic league appearances and goals as of 22:46, 2 June 2017 (UTC)

Pita Biri Rabo (born 30 July 1977), is a Fijian footballer who plays as a forward for Fijian National Football League side Suva. As well as being club captain, Rabo is also a coach for the Suva-based club.

== Club career ==
Rabo joined Palmerston North-based side Manawatu United ahead of the 2011–12 season, but left in December 2011, citing personal reasons. He returned to Wairarapa United, but did not stay long, joining Suva F.C. for the 2013 season.

== Career statistics ==
=== International ===
Appearances and goals by national team and year
National team	Year	Apps	Goals
Fiji	1998	2	0
Fiji	2000	–	
Fiji	2001	–	
Fiji	2002	–	
Fiji	2003	6	1
Fiji	2004	1	1
Fiji	2005	–	
Fiji	2006	–	
Fiji	2007	9	3
Total		18	5

Scores and results list Fiji's goal tally first, score column indicates score after each Rabo goal.

List of international goals scored by Pita Rabo
No.	Date	Venue	Opponent	Score	Result	Competition
1	5 July 2003	Ratu Cakobau Park, Nausori, Fiji	Kiribati	5–0	12–0	2003 South Pacific Games
2	12 May 2004	National Soccer Stadium, Apia, Samoa	Papua New Guinea	1–1	4–2	2006 FIFA World Cup qualification
3	25 August 2007	National Soccer Stadium, Apia, Samoa	Tuvalu	2–0	16–0	2007 South Pacific Games
4	25 August 2007	National Soccer Stadium, Apia, Samoa	Tuvalu	8–0	16–0	2007 South Pacific Games
5	25 August 2007	National Soccer Stadium, Apia, Samoa	Tuvalu	10–0	16–0	2007 South Pacific Games

== Honours ==
Fiji

- OFC Nations Cup: 3rd place, 2008
- Pacific Games: Gold Medalist, 2003; Silver Medalist, 2007
