= Football at the 2007 South Pacific Games =

Football at the XIII Pacific Games
- Dates: 25 August – 7 September 2007
- Host city: Apia, Samoa
- Level: Senior
- Events: 2
- Participation: 10 nations

Football at the 2007 South Pacific Games in Apia, Samoa was held from 25 August to 7 September 2007.

== Medal summary ==
=== Medal table ===
| Rank | Nation | Gold | Silver | Bronze | Total |
|---|---|---|---|---|---|
| 1 | New Caledonia (NCL) | 1 | 0 | 0 | 1 |
| 1 | Papua New Guinea (PNG) | 1 | 0 | 0 | 1 |
| 3 | Fiji (FIJ) | 0 | 1 | 1 | 2 |
| 4 | Tonga (TGA) | 0 | 1 | 0 | 1 |
| 5 | Vanuatu (VAN) | 0 | 0 | 1 | 1 |
| Totals (5 entries) | | 2 | 2 | 2 | 6 |

=== Results ===
| Event | Gold | Silver | Bronze |
|---|---|---|---|
| Men | New Caledonia | Fiji | Vanuatu |
| Women | Papua New Guinea | Tonga | Fiji |

== See also ==
- Football at the 2007 South Pacific Games – Men's tournament
- Football at the 2007 South Pacific Games – Women's tournament
