= Football at the 2007 South Pacific Games – Men's tournament =

Men's Football at the South Pacific Games 2007
Tournament details
- Host country: Samoa
- Dates: 25 August – 7 September
- Teams: 10 (from 1 confederation)
- Venue: 1 (in 1 host city)

Final positions
- Champions: New Caledonia (5th title)
- Runners-up: Fiji
- Third place: Vanuatu
- Fourth place: Solomon Islands

Tournament statistics
- Matches played: 24
- Goals scored: 110 (4.58 per match)
- Attendance: 13,000 (542 per match)
- Top scorer(s): (Fiji) Osea Vakatalesau (10 goals)

The 2007 Pacific Games men's football tournament was held at the Toleafoa J.S. Blatter Complex in Apia, Samoa in from 25 August to 7 September 2007.

The men's tournament formed the first stage of the Oceania Football Confederation's (OFC) qualification tournament for the 2010 FIFA World Cup and the qualification tournament for the 2008 OFC Nations Cup.

== Tournament ==
The final accredited athlete list at the SPG website shows 10 entered sides. Papua New Guinea, although listed by FIFA as having applied for the 2010 World Cup, did not enter. Tuvalu did enter (although they were not eligible for the World Cup). The group stage draw, undertaken by Tim Cahill, was held on 12 June 2007 in Auckland, New Zealand.

New Caledonia's captain, Pierre Wajoka scored a ninth-minute penalty against Tahiti in the opening fixture of the games, earning him the distinction of being the scorer of the first goal of the 2010 FIFA World Cup qualification process.

== Group seedings ==
Group A	Group B
Fiji – 153rd; Tahiti – 173rd; New Caledonia – 175th; Cook Islands – 198th; Tuvalu – N/A	Solomon Islands – 161st; Vanuatu – 168th; Samoa – 189th; Tonga – 190th; American Samoa – 199th

Notes:

- Tuvalu was unranked by FIFA as it was not a member (and not an entrant to the World Cup).
- Although the draw took place in June, FIFA rankings are shown as of February 2007, which accords with press reports of the rankings used in the draw seeding.

== Group stage ==
=== Group A ===
Team	Pld	W	D	L	GF	GA	GD	Pts	Fiji national football team	New Caledonia national football team	Tahiti national football team	Cook Islands national football team	Tuvalu national football team
Fiji	4	3	1	0	25	1	+24	10				4–0	16–0
New Caledonia	4	3	1	0	6	1	+5	10	1–1			3–0	
Tahiti	4	1	1	2	2	6	−4	4	0–4	0–1			
Cook Islands	4	1	0	3	4	9	−5	3			0–1		4–1
Tuvalu (Note: Tuvalu were not members of FIFA and so were not eligible to qualify for the World Cup.)	4	0	1	3	2	22	−20	1		0–1	1–1		

Legend: Blue = home team win; Yellow = draw; Red = away team win.
Notes:

25 August 2007
15:00 UTC-11

Tahiti	0–1	New Caledonia
	Report	Wajoka 9' (pen.)

Toleafoa J.S. Blatter Complex, Apia, Samoa
Attendance: 400
Referee: Michael Hester (New Zealand)
25 August 2007
18:00 UTC-11

Fiji	16–0	Tuvalu
Krishna 6', 14', 22'; Rabo 11', 34', 45'; Baleitoga 17'; Tiwa 28', 30'; Vakatalesau 42', 46', 65', 73', 82', 89'; Finau 68' (pen.)	Report

Toleafoa J.S. Blatter Complex, Apia, Samoa
Attendance: 200
Referee: Fiti Aimaasu (Samoa)

27 August 2007
15:00 UTC-11

Tuvalu	0–1	New Caledonia
	Report	Kabeu 52'

Toleafoa J.S. Blatter Complex, Apia, Samoa
Attendance: 250
Referee: Nelson Sogo (Solomon Islands)
27 August 2007
18:00 UTC-11

Fiji	4–0	Cook Islands
Vakatalesau 19'; Waqa 40'; Bukalidi 63'; Kainihewe 82'	Report

Toleafoa J.S. Blatter Complex, Apia, Samoa
Attendance: 400
Referee: Lencie Fred (Vanuatu)

29 August 2007
15:00 UTC-11

Tuvalu	1–1	Tahiti
Sekifu 87'	Report	Williams 45+1'

Toleafoa J.S. Blatter Complex, Apia, Samoa
Attendance: 100
Referee: Chris Lengata (Solomon Islands)
29 August 2007
18:00 UTC-11

New Caledonia	3–0	Cook Islands
Kabeu 35', 51', 85'	Report

Toleafoa J.S. Blatter Complex, Apia, Samoa
Attendance: 200
Referee: Neil Fox (New Zealand)

1 September 2007
12:30 UTC-11

Cook Islands	4–1	Tuvalu
Mateariki 28', 69'; Le Mouton 88'; Tom 90+3'	Report	Willis 83' (o.g.)

Toleafoa J.S. Blatter Complex, Apia, Samoa
Attendance: 200
Referee: Michael Hester (New Zealand)
1 September 2007
18:00 UTC-11

Tahiti	0–4	Fiji
	Report	Waqa 17'; Baleitoga 38'; Vakatalesau 49', 73'

Toleafoa J.S. Blatter Complex, Apia, Samoa
Attendance: 200
Referee: Neil Fox (New Zealand)

3 September 2007
15:00 UTC-11

New Caledonia	1–1	Fiji
Wajoka 44'	Report	Kainihewe 56'

Toleafoa J.S. Blatter Complex, Apia, Samoa
Attendance: 1,000
Referee: Lencie Fred (Vanuatu)
3 September 2007
15:00 UTC-11

Cook Islands	0–1	Tahiti
	Report	Tinorua 64'

Toleafoa J.S. Blatter Complex, Apia, Samoa
Attendance: 100
Referee: Fiti Aimaasu (Samoa)

=== Group B ===
Team	Pld	W	D	L	GF	GA	GD	Pts	Solomon Islands national football team	Vanuatu national football team	Samoa national football team	Tonga national football team	American Samoa national football team
Solomon Islands	4	4	0	0	21	1	+20	12				4–0	12–1
Vanuatu	4	3	0	1	23	3	+20	9	0–2		4–0		
Samoa	4	2	0	2	9	8	+1	6	0–3			2–1	
Tonga	4	1	0	3	6	10	−4	3		1–4			4–0
American Samoa	4	0	0	4	1	38	−37	0		0–15	0–7		

Legend: Blue = home team win; Yellow = draw; Red = away team win.

25 August 2007
15:00 UTC-11

Solomon Islands	12–1	American Samoa
Totori 12', 15'; Menapi 20' (pen.), 41', 75', 82'; Fa'arodo 43'; Waita 58', 85'; Bebeu 69'; Molea 77'; Takayama 90+2'	Report	Ott 55' (pen.)

Toleafoa J.S. Blatter Complex, Apia, Samoa
Attendance: 300
Referee: Salaiau Sosongan (Papua New Guinea)
25 August 2007
20:30 UTC-11

Vanuatu	4–0	Samoa
Iwai 21'; Naprapol 43'; Poida 66'; Soromon 90+2'	Report

Toleafoa J.S. Blatter Complex, Apia, Samoa
Attendance: 300
Referee: Averii Jacques (Tahiti)

27 August 2007
15:00 UTC-11

Solomon Islands	4–0	Tonga
Menapi 5', 12'; Fa'arodo 51'; Maemae 66'	Report

Toleafoa J.S. Blatter Complex, Apia, Samoa
Attendance: 350
Referee: Fiti Aimaasu (Samoa)
27 August 2007
20:30 UTC-11

American Samoa	0–7	Samoa
	Report	Tumua 24', 51'; Faaiuaso 29'; Cahill 43' (pen.), 67'; Fonoti 61'; Michael 76'

Toleafoa J.S. Blatter Complex, Apia, Samoa
Attendance: 2,800
Referee: Job Minan (Papua New Guinea)

29 August 2007
15:00 UTC-11

American Samoa	0–15	Vanuatu
	Report	Poida 19'; Mermer 24', 45', 45+1', 68'; Sakama 43', 79', 90+1'; Chichirua 56'; Iwai 62'; Tomake 72'; Soromon 81', 84', 86', 90+2'

Toleafoa J.S. Blatter Complex, Apia, Samoa
Attendance: 200
Referee: Michael Hester (New Zealand)
29 August 2007
20:30 UTC-11

Samoa	2–1	Tonga
Faaiuaso 45+1'; Taylor 83'	Report	Feao 54'

Toleafoa J.S. Blatter Complex, Apia, Samoa
Attendance: 1,850
Referee: Salaiau Sosongan (Papua New Guinea)

1 September 2007
12:30 UTC-11

Tonga	4–0	American Samoa
Moala 37' (pen.); Palu 54', 61'; K. Uhatahi 86'	Report

Toleafoa J.S. Blatter Complex, Apia, Samoa
Attendance: 200
Referee: Job Minan (Papua New Guinea)
1 September 2007
14:30 UTC-11

Vanuatu	0–2	Solomon Islands
	Report	Bebeu 60'; Fa'arodo 64'

Toleafoa J.S. Blatter Complex, Apia, Samoa
Attendance: 1,000
Referee: Averii Jacques (Tahiti)

3 September 2007
12:30 UTC-11

Samoa	0–3	Solomon Islands
	Report	Totori 1', 37'; Maemae 69'

Toleafoa J.S. Blatter Complex, Apia, Samoa
Attendance: 200
Referee: Michael Hester (New Zealand)
3 September 2007
12:30 UTC-11

Tonga	1–4	Vanuatu
Savieti 50'	Report	Soromon 24', 34', 41'; Maleb 76'

Toleafoa J.S. Blatter Complex, Apia, Samoa
Attendance: 50
Referee: Job Minan (Papua New Guinea)

== Knockout stage ==
Semi-finals
Solomon Islands	2
New Caledonia	3
Fiji	3
Vanuatu	0

Final
New Caledonia	1
Fiji	0
Third place match
Solomon Islands	0
Vanuatu	2

=== Semi-finals ===
5 September 2007
15:00 UTC-11

Solomon Islands	2–3	New Caledonia
Fa'arodo 40'; Menapi 47'	Report	Kabeu 37'; P. Toto 54'; Mercier 90+4'

Toleafoa J.S. Blatter Complex, Apia, Samoa
Attendance: 1,500
Referee: Job Minan (Papua New Guinea)
5 September 2007
18:00 UTC-11

Fiji	3–0	Vanuatu
Baleitoga 44'; Vakatalesau 69' (pen.); Krishna 70'	Report

Toleafoa J.S. Blatter Complex, Apia, Samoa
Attendance: 600
Referee: Michael Hester (New Zealand)

=== Bronze medal match ===
7 September 2007
14:30 UTC-11

Solomon Islands	0–2	Vanuatu
	Report	Soromon 45+3'; Sakama 50'

Toleafoa J.S. Blatter Complex, Apia, Samoa
Attendance: 200
Referee: Averii Jacques (Tahiti)

=== Gold medal match ===
7 September 2007
18:00 UTC-11

New Caledonia	1–0	Fiji
Hmaé 61'	Report

Toleafoa J.S. Blatter Complex, Apia, Samoa
Attendance: 400
Referee: Michael Hester (New Zealand)

2007 South Pacific Games winners

New Caledonia
Fifth title

(Note): The three medallists, New Caledonia, Fiji, and Vanuatu, advanced to the 2008 OFC Nations Cup (together with automatic qualifier New Zealand).

== Advancement questions ==
=== Tuvalu ===
There remained some uncertainty as to what procedure would occur to Tuvalu advance - as they were not members of FIFA (and therefore did not enter the 2010 FIFA World Cup). While no explicit ruling was communicated on this matter, comments in the press release for the OFC Second Stage draw referred to "nine eligible nations", suggesting that Tuvalu would not have advanced to the OFC Nations Cup regardless of their performance in the South Pacific Games. Had Tuvalu finished in a medal position, the fourth place team would presumably have qualified for the next round of qualifying with the other two medal winners and New Zealand. Tuvalu's early elimination from the competition put an end to any complication over the qualifying process for the next round.

This was the first time ever that a non-FIFA nation has competed in the World Cup. The closest situation in the past was the case of New Caledonia during the 2006 World Cup qualifiers. However, they were at the time in the process of accession to the organisation, and were eliminated from contention for the finals just days before their final admission to the FIFA family.

=== Papua New Guinea ===
Papua New Guinea, having initially entered the 2010 World Cup and indicated their intention to enter the South Pacific Games, were involved in a dispute with their sporting authorities and failed to meet the official accreditation deadline for the South Pacific Games. This meant they were effectively disqualified from the World Cup.

== Goalscorers ==
There were 110 goals scored in 24 matches, for an average of 4.58 goals per match.

10 goals

- (Fiji) Osea Vakatalesau

9 goals

- (Vanuatu) Seule Soromon

7 goals

- (Solomon Islands) Commins Menapi

5 goals

- (New Caledonia) Iamel Kabeu

4 goals

- (Fiji) Roy Krishna
- (Solomon Islands) Henry Fa'arodo
- (Solomon Islands) Benjamin Totori
- (Vanuatu) Etienne Mermer
- (Vanuatu) François Sakama

3 goals

- (Fiji) Pita Baleitoga
- (Fiji) Pita Rabo

2 goals

- (Cook Islands) Teariki Mateariki
- (Fiji) Malakai Kainihewe
- (Fiji) Malakai Tiwa
- (Fiji) Taniela Waqa
- (New Caledonia) Pierre Wajoka
- (Samoa) Chris Cahill
- (Samoa) Desmond Fa'aiuaso
- (Samoa) Penitito Tumua
- (Solomon Islands) Godwin Bebeu
- (Solomon Islands) Alick Maemae
- (Solomon Islands) Stanley Waita
- (Tonga) Pio Palu
- (Vanuatu) Richard Iwai
- (Vanuatu) Moise Poida

1 goal

- (American Samoa) Ramin Ott
- (Cook Islands) Thomas La Mouton
- (Cook Islands) Kunda Tom
- (Fiji) Joasaia Bukalidi
- (Fiji) Peni Finau
- (New Caledonia) José Hmaé
- (New Caledonia) Yohann Mercier
- (New Caledonia) Poulidor Toto
- (Samoa) Damien Fonoti
- (Samoa) Junior Michael
- (Samoa) Lionel Taylor
- (Solomon Islands) Judd Molea
- (Solomon Islands) Samson Takayama
- (French Polynesia) Temarii Tinorua
- (French Polynesia) Axel Williams
- (Tonga) Unaloto Feao
- (Tonga) Lafeale Moala
- (Tonga) Malakai Savieti
- (Tonga) Kaisani Uhatahi
- (Tuvalu) Viliamu Sekifu
- (Vanuatu) Andrew Chichirua
- (Vanuatu) Victor Maleb
- (Vanuatu) Jean Nako Naprapol
- (Vanuatu) Tom Tomake

1 own goal

- (Cook Islands) Stephen Willis (against Tuvalu)

== See also ==
- Pacific Games
- Football at the 2007 South Pacific Games – Women's tournament
