= National Soccer Stadium, Apia =

Stadium in Apia, Samoa

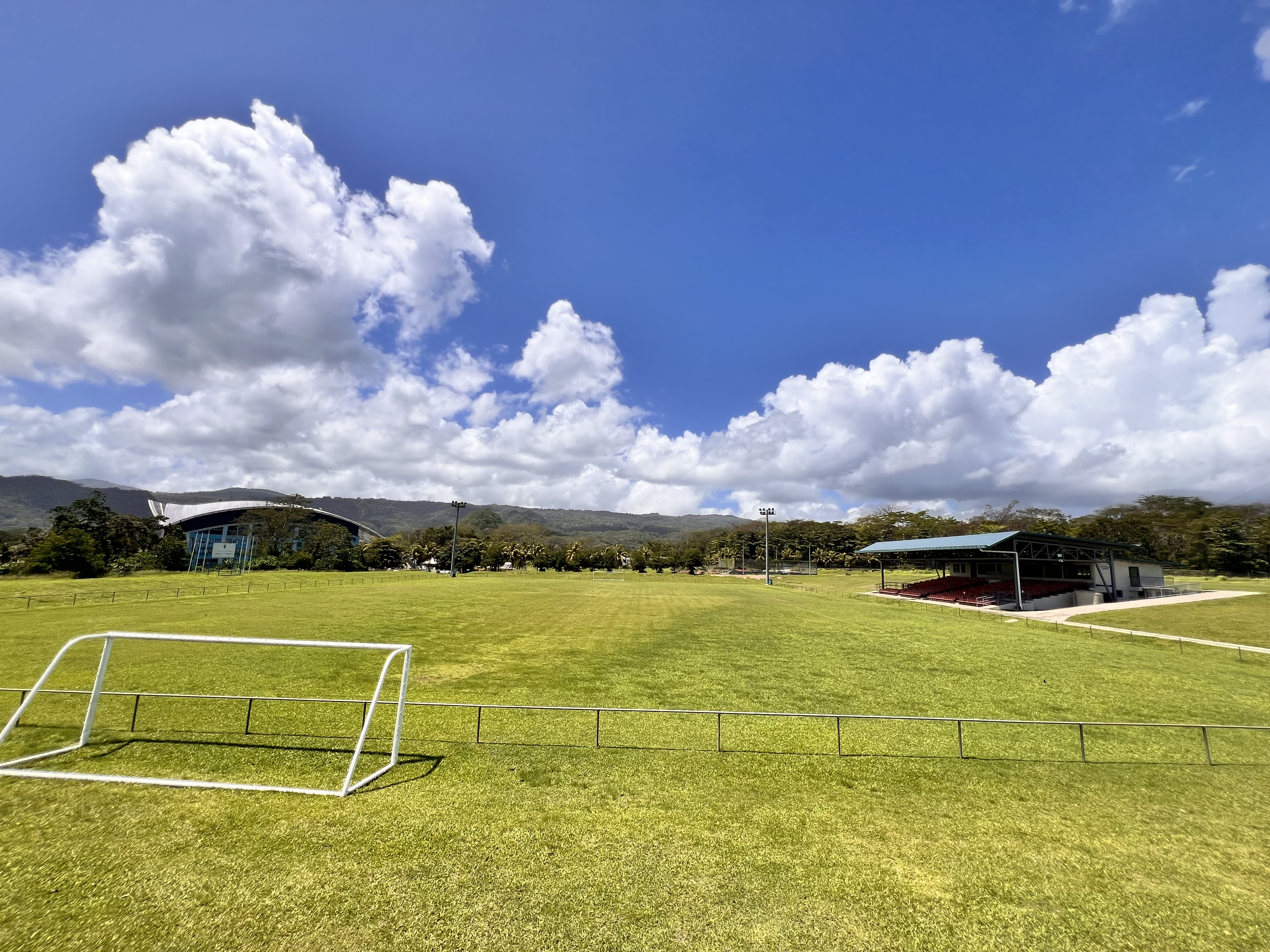

- Location of Apia within Samoa
- Full name: Football Federation Samoa Football Stadium
- Location: Apia, Samoa
- Coordinates: 13°50′12″S 171°45′7″W
- Owner: Samoa Football Federation
- Operator: Samoa National Soccer Stadium
- Capacity: 3,500
- Surface: Grass

The Football Federation Samoa Football Stadium (or simply FFS Football Stadium) is a football stadium located in Apia, Samoa. It is the national stadium of Samoa and the home of the Samoa national football team and the Samoa National League. It also was the venue for the 2012 OFC Nations Cup Qualification and different youth and women's football tournaments in Oceania.

== Hosted competitions ==
- 2007 Pacific Games
- 2012 OFC Nations Cup Qualification
- 2014 FIFA World Cup OFC first round qualification
- 2015 OFC U-17 Championship
- 2017 OFC U-17 Championship - First Round
- 2019 Pacific Games
- 2026 FIFA World Cup OFC first round qualification

== Owning teams ==
- Samoa national rugby union team
- Samoa women's national football team
- Samoa national football team

== See also ==
- Tuanaimato
