= Australia men's national soccer team results (2000–2019) =

This is a list of Australia men's national soccer team results from 2000 to 2019.

== 2000s ==
=== 2000 ===
9 February International Friendly	Chile	2–1	Australia	Valparaíso, Chile
	Gonzalez 10'; Navia 90+2' (pen.)	Report	Corica 15'	Stadium: Estadio Playa Ancha; Attendance: 9,000; Referee: Eduardo Gamboa (Chile

12 February International Friendly	Australia	0–0	Slovakia	Valparaiso, Chile
		Report		Stadium: Estadio Playa Ancha; Attendance: 9,000; Referee: Luis Mariano Pena (Chile

15 February International Friendly	Australia	1–1	Bulgaria	Valparaiso, Chile
	Agostino 1'	Report	Ivanov 89'	Stadium: Estadio Playa Ancha; Attendance: 8,000; Referee: Ruben Selman (Chile

23 February International Friendly	Hungary	0–3	Australia	Budapest, Hungary
		Report	Laybutt 12'; Skoko 72'; Moore 89'	Stadium: Üllői úti Stadion; Attendance: 14,000; Referee: Dietmar Drabek (Austria)

29 March International Friendly	Czech Republic	3–1	Australia	Teplice, Czech Republic
	Fukal 10'; Koller 53'; Ulich 66'	Report	Foster 88'	Stadium: Na Stínadlech Stadium; Attendance: 9,820; Referee: Hrinak (Slovenia)

9 June International Friendly	Australia	0–0	Paraguay	Sydney, Australia
		Report		Stadium: Sydney Football Stadium; Attendance: 10,000; Referee: Simon Micallef (Australia)

12 June International Friendly	Australia	0–0	Paraguay	Brisbane, Australia
		Report		Stadium: The Gabba; Attendance: 10,000; Referee: Mark Shield (Australia)

15 June International Friendly	Australia	2–1	Paraguay	Melbourne, Australia
	Foster 47'; Zdrilic 52'	Report	Caceres 58'	Stadium: Olympic Park Stadium; Attendance: 7,500; Referee: Gerry Connolly (Australia)

19 June 2000 OFC Nations Cup Group A	Cook Islands	0–17	Australia	Papeete, Tahiti
		Report	Agostino 18', 53', 68'; Muscat 21', 45' (pen.); Tiatto 24'; Foster 30', 51', 80'; Zdrilic 35', 42', 65'; Popovic 59'; Corica 70'; Zane 82', 87', 89'	Stadium: Stade de Pater; Attendance: 1,000; Referee: Ronan Leaustic (Tahiti)

23 June 2000 OFC Nations Cup Group A	Australia	6–0	Solomon Islands	Papeete, Tahiti
	Chipperfield 6'; Zane 13', 35'; Omokirio 36' (o.g.); Muscat 39' (pen.); Cardozo 43'	Report		Stadium: Stade de Pater; Attendance: 300; Referee: Brian Precious (New Zealand)

25 June 2000 OFC Nations Cup Semi-final	Australia	1–0	Vanuatu	Papeete, Tahiti
	Muscat 4' (pen.)	Report		Stadium: Stade de Pater; Attendance: 300; Referee: Brian Precious (New Zealand)

28 June 2000 OFC Nations Cup Final	Australia	2–0	New Zealand	Papeete, Tahiti
	Murphy 40'; Foster 66'	Report		Attendance: 2,000; Referee: Harry Attison (Vanuatu)

4 October 2000 LG Cup	Kuwait	0–1	Australia	Dubai, United Arab Emirates
		Report	Aloisi 49'

7 October 2000 LG Cup	South Korea	4–2	Australia	Dubai, United Arab Emirates
	Jae-won 44'; Jung-yoon 48'; Ki-hyeon 65'; Dong-gook 90+2' (pen.)	Report	Agostino 30', 35'

15 November International Friendly	Scotland	0–2	Australia	Glasgow, United Kingdom
		Report	Emerton 12'; Zdrilic 66'	Stadium: Hampden Park; Attendance: 30,985; Referee: Pascal Garibian (France)

=== 2001 ===
28 February International Friendly	Colombia	3–2	Australia	Bogotá, Colombia
	Serna 12'; Salazar 66'; Grisales 75'	Report	Corica 77' (pen.); Chipperfield 90'	Stadium: Nemesio Camacho Stadium; Attendance: 2,071; Referee: Henry Cervantes

9 April 2002 FIFA World Cup qualification Group 1	Tonga	0–22	Australia	Coffs Harbour, Australia
		Report	Chipperfield 3', 84'; Mori 12', 22', 39', 57'; Aloisi 14', 23', 36', 45', 51', 63'; Muscat 17' (pen.), 28' (pen.), 54' (pen.), 83'; Popovic 65'; Vidmar 73'; Zdrilic 77', 90'; Thompson 79'; Boutsianis 85'	Stadium: International Sports Stadium; Attendance: 1,500; Referee: Harry Attison (Vanuatu)

11 April 2002 FIFA World Cup qualification Group 1	Australia	31–0	American Samoa	Coffs Harbour, Australia
	Boutsianis 10', 50', 84'; Thompson 12', 23', 27', 29', 32', 37', 42', 45', 56', 60'; Thompson 65', 85', 88'; Zdrilic 13', 21', 25', 33', 58', 66', 78', 89'; A. Vidmar 14', 80'; Popovic 17', 19'; Colosimo 51', 81'; De Amicis 55'	Report		Stadium: International Sports Stadium; Attendance: 3,500; Referee: Ronan Leaustic (Tahiti)

14 April 2002 FIFA World Cup qualification Group 1	Fiji	0–2	Australia	Coffs Harbour, Australia
		Report	Corica 22'; Foxe 79'	Stadium: International Sports Stadium; Referee: Derek Rugg (New Zealand)

16 April 2002 FIFA World Cup qualification Group 1	Australia	11–0	Samoa	Coffs Harbour, Australia
	Vidmar 5', 49'; Zdrilic 28', 57'; Foxe 44'; Popovic 55', 89'; Thompson 75', 78'; Chipperfield 76'; Bureta 81' (o.g.)	Report		Stadium: International Sports Stadium; Referee: Brian Precious (New Zealand)

30 May 2001 FIFA Confederations Cup Group A	Mexico	0–2	Australia	Suwon, South Korea
		Report	Murphy 20'; Skoko 55'	Stadium: Suwon World Cup Stadium; Attendance: 6,232; Referee: Felix Tangawarima (Zimbabwe)

1 June 2001 FIFA Confederations Cup Group A	Australia	1–0	France	Daegu, South Korea
	Zane 59'	Report		Stadium: Daegu World Cup Stadium; Attendance: 44,400; Referee: Carlos Batres (Guatemala)

3 June 2001 FIFA Confederations Cup Group A	South Korea	1–0	Australia	Suwon, South Korea
	Hwang 24'	Report		Stadium: Suwon World Cup Stadium; Attendance: 42,754; Referee: Carlos Batres (Colombia)

7 June 2001 FIFA Confederations Cup Semi-final	Japan	1–0	Australia	Yokohama, Japan
	Nakata 43'			Stadium: Yokohama International Stadium; Attendance: 48,699; Referee: Benito Archundia (Mexico)

9 June 2001 FIFA Confederations Cup Third place	Australia	1–0	Brazil	Ulsan, South Korea
	Murphy 84'	Report		Stadium: Ulsan Munsu Football Stadium; Attendance: 28,520; Referee: Hellmut Krug (Germany)

20 June 2002 FIFA World Cup qualification Final Round	New Zealand	0–2	Australia	Wellington, New Zealand
		Report	Emerton 6', 82'	Stadium: Westpac Trust Stadium; Referee: Okada (Japan)

24 June 2002 FIFA World Cup qualification Final Round	Australia	4–1	New Zealand	Sydney, Australia
	Zdrilic 6', 83'; Emerton 37'; Aloisi 56'	Report	Coveny 44' (pen.)	Stadium: Stadium Australia; Referee: Kwon Jung Chul (South Korea)

15 August International Friendly	Japan	3–0	Australia	Fukuroi, Japan
	Yanagisawa 19'; Hattori 53'; Nakayama 65' (pen.)	Report		Stadium: Shizuoka Stadium; Attendance: 60,000; Referee: Zhang Jianjun

11 November International Friendly	Australia	1–1	France	Melbourne, Australia
	Moore 43'	Report	Trezeguet 49'	Stadium: Melbourne Cricket Ground; Attendance: 53,173; Referee: Simon Micallef (Australia)

20 November 2002 FIFA World Cup qualification Intercontinental Play-off	Australia	1–0	Uruguay	Melbourne, Australia
	Muscat 79' (pen.)	Report		Stadium: Melbourne Cricket Ground; Attendance: 84,656; Referee: Graziano Cesare (Italy

25 November 2002 FIFA World Cup qualification Intercontinental Play-off	Uruguay	3–0	Australia	Montevideo, Uruguay
	Silva 14'; Morales 70', 90'	Report		Stadium: Estadio Centenario; Attendance: 62,000; Referee: Ali Bujsaim (United Arab Emirates)

=== 2002 ===
6 July 2002 OFC Nations Cup Group A	Australia	2–0	Vanuatu	Auckland, New Zealand
	Mori 69'; Despotovski 85'	Report		Stadium: Ericsson Stadium; Attendance: 1,000+ Referee: Charles Ariiotima (Tahiti)

8 July 2002 OFC Nations Cup Group A	Australia	11–0	New Caledonia	Auckland, New Zealand
	Despotovski 3', 55' (pen.), 75', 77'; Horvat 14'; Chipperfield 21', 35'; Mori 34'; Costanzo 82'; Porter 86'; Trimboli 90+1' (pen.)	Report		Stadium: Ericsson Stadium; Attendance: 200; Referee: Derek Rugg (New Zealand)

10 July 2002 OFC Nations Cup Group A	Australia	8–0	Fiji	Auckland, New Zealand
	Milicic 5'; Porter 8', 13', 44', 53'; Juric 36'; Trimboli 47'; De Amicis 89'	Report		Stadium: Ericsson Stadium; Attendance: 1,000+ Referee: Joakim Sosongan (Papua New Guinea)

12 July 2002 OFC Nations Cup Semi-final	Australia	2–1 (a.e.t.)	Tahiti	Auckland, New Zealand
	Durakovic 88'; Mori 96'	Report	Zaveroni 38'	Stadium: Ericsson Stadium; Attendance: 400; Referee: Derek Rugg (New Zealand)

14 July 2002 OFC Nations Cup Final	New Zealand	1–0	Australia	Auckland, New Zealand
	Nelsen 78'	Report		Stadium: Ericsson Stadium; Attendance: 3,000; Referee: Charles Ariiotima (Tahiti)

=== 2003 ===
12 February International Friendly	England	1–3	Australia	London, United Kingdom
	Jeffers 69'	Report	Popovic 16'; Kewell 42'; Emerton 84'	Stadium: Upton Park; Attendance: 30,590; Referee: Manuel Mejuto González (Spain)

19 August International Friendly	Republic of Ireland	2–1	Australia	Dublin, Republic of Ireland
	O'Shea 74'; Morrison 81'	Report	Viduka 49'	Stadium: Lansdowne Road; Attendance: 37,200; Referee: Karel Vidlak (Czech Republic)

7 September International Friendly	Australia	2–1	Jamaica	Reading, United Kingdom
	Bresciano 19'; Kewell 58'	Report	Lisbie 21'	Stadium: Madejski Stadium; Attendance: 37,200; Referee: Andy D'urso (England)

=== 2004 ===
18 February International Friendly	Venezuela	1–1	Australia	Caracas, Venezuela
	Arango 90+2'	Report	Agostino 18'	Stadium: Olympic Stadium; Attendance: 12,000; Referee: Oscar Julian Ruiz (Colombia)

30 March International Friendly	Australia	1–0	South Africa	London, United Kingdom
	Bresciano 19'	Report		Stadium: Loftus Road; Attendance: 16,108; Referee: Mark Halsey (England)

21 May International Friendly	Australia	1–3	Turkey	Sydney, Australia
	Bresciano 47' (pen.)	Report	Ozat 42'; Sukur 69', 75'	Stadium: Sydney Football Stadium; Attendance: 28,325; Referee: Toru Kamikawa (Japan)

24 May International Friendly	Australia	0–1	Turkey	Melbourne, Australia
			Kahveci 44'	Stadium: Telstra Dome; Attendance: 28,953; Referee: Derek Rugg (New Zealand)

29 May International Friendly	Australia	1–0	New Zealand	Adelaide, Australia
	Bresciano 40'			Stadium: Hindmarsh Stadium; Attendance: 12,130; Referee: Claus Bo Larsen (Denmark)

31 May 2004 ONC / 2006 WCQ	Australia	9–0	Tahiti	Adelaide, Australia
	Cahill 14', 47'; Skoko 43'; Simon 44' (o.g.); Sterjovski 51', 61', 74'; Zdrilic 85'; Chipperfield 89'	Report		Stadium: Hindmarsh Stadium; Attendance: 1,200; Referee: Harry Attison (Vanuatu)

2 June 2004 ONC / 2006 WCQ	Australia	6–1	Fiji	Adelaide, Australia
	Madaschi 6', 50'; Cahill 39', 66', 75'; Elrich 89'	Report	Gataurua 58'	Stadium: Marden Sports Complex; Attendance: 2,000; Referee: Eduardo Gonzales (Spain)

4 June 2004 ONC / 2006 WCQ	Vanuatu	0–3	Australia	Adelaide, Australia
		Report	Aloisi 25', 85'; Emerton 81'	Stadium: Hindmarsh Stadium; Attendance: 2,000; Referee: Charles Ariiotima (Tahiti)

6 June 2004 ONC / 2006 WCQ	Solomon Islands	2–2	Australia	Adelaide, Australia
	Cahill 50', 52'	Report	Menapi 43', 75'	Stadium: Hindmarsh Stadium; Attendance: 3,500; Referee: Eduardo Gonzales (Spain)

9 October 2004 ONC / 2006 WCQ	Solomon Islands	1–5	Australia	Honiara, Solomon Islands
	B. Suri 59'	Report	Skoko 5', 28'; Milicic 19'; Emerton 44'; Elrich 79'	Stadium: Lawson Tama Stadium; Attendance: 21,000; Referee: Peter O'Leary (New Zealand)

12 October 2004 ONC / 2006 WCQ	Australia	6–0	Solomon Islands	Sydney, Australia
	Milicic 5'; Kewell 8'; Vidmar 60'; Thompson 79'; Elrich 82'; Emerton 86'	Report		Stadium: Sydney Football Stadium; Attendance: 19,208; Referee: Leone Rakaroi (Fiji)

16 November International Friendly	Australia	2–2	Norway	London, United Kingdom
	Cahill 44'; Skoko 58'	Report	Iversen 40'; Pedersen 72'	Stadium: Craven Cottage; Attendance: 7,364; Referee: Robert Styles (England)

=== 2005 ===
9 February International Friendly	South Africa	1–1	Australia	Durban, South Africa
	McCarthy 12'	Report	Chipperfield 71'	Stadium: ABSA Stadium; Attendance:

26 March International Friendly	Australia	2–1	Iraq	Sydney, Australia
	Bresciano 22'; Elrich 72'	Report	Nasir 11'	Stadium: Telstra Stadium; Attendance: 30,258; Referee: Peter O'Leary (New Zealand)

29 March International Friendly	Australia	3–0	Indonesia	Perth, Australia
	Milicic 24', 57'; Zdrilic 85'	Report		Stadium: Subiaco Oval; Attendance: 13,719; Referee: Hirofumi Yamanishi (Japan)

9 June International Friendly	Australia	1–0	New Zealand	London, United Kingdom
	Colosimo 87'	Report		Stadium: Craven Cottage; Attendance: 9,023; Referee: Mike Dean (England)

15 June 2005 FIFA Confederations Cup Group A	Germany	4–3	Australia	Frankfurt, Germany
	Kurányi 17'; Mertesacker 23'; Ballack 60' (pen.); Podolski 88'	Report	Skoko 21'; Aloisi 31', 90+2'	Stadium: Waldstadion; Attendance: 46,477; Referee: Carlos Amarilla (Paraguay)

18 June 2005 FIFA Confederations Cup Group A	Australia	2–4	Argentina	Nuremberg, Germany
	Aloisi 61' (pen.), 70'	Report	Figueroa 12', 53', 89'; Riquelme 31' (pen.)	Stadium: Frankenstadion; Attendance: 25,618; Referee: Shamsul Maidin (Singapore)

21 June 2005 FIFA Confederations Cup Group A	Australia	0–2	Tunisia	Leipzig, Germany
		Report	Santos 26', 70'	Stadium: Zentralstadion; Attendance: 23,952; Referee: Carlos Chandía (Chile)

3 September 2006 FIFA World Cup qualification Final Round	Australia	7–0	Solomon Islands	Sydney, Australia
	Culina 21'; Viduka 36', 43'; Cahill 57'; Chipperfield 64'; Thompson 69'; Emerton 89'	Report		Stadium: Sydney Football Stadium; Attendance: 14,715; Referee: Subkhiddin Mohd Salleh (Malaysia)

7 September 2006 FIFA World Cup qualification Final Round	Solomon Islands	1–2	Australia	Honiara, Solomon Islands
	Fa'arodo 49' (pen.)	Report	Thompson 17'; Emerton 59'	Stadium: Lawson Tama Stadium; Attendance: 15,000; Referee: Shamsul Maidin (Singapore)

9 October International Friendly	Australia	5–0	Jamaica	London, United Kingdom
	Bresciano 3'; Thompson 29'; Viduka 48'; Aloisi 58'; Griffiths 85'	Report		Stadium: Craven Cottage; Attendance: 6,570; Referee: Mike Riley (England)

12 November 2006 FIFA World Cup qualification Inter-confederation play-offs	Uruguay	1–0	Australia	Montevideo, Uruguay
	D. Rodriguez 35'	Report		Stadium: Estadio Centenario; Attendance: 55,000; Referee: Claus Bo Larson (Denmark)

16 November 2006 FIFA World Cup qualification Inter-confederation play-offs	Australia	1–0 (4–2 p)	Uruguay	Sydney, Australia
	Bresciano 35'	Report		Stadium: Stadium Australia; Attendance: 82,698; Referee: Luis Medina Cantalejo (Spain)
	Penalties
	Kewell (penalty scored); Neill (penalty scored); Vidmar (penalty scored); Viduka (penalty missed); Aloisi (penalty scored)		(penalty missed) D. Rodriguez; (penalty scored) Varela; (penalty scored) Estoyanoff; (penalty missed) Zalayeta

=== 2006 ===
22 February 2007 AFC Asian Cup qualification Group D	Bahrain	1–3	Australia	Riffa, Bahrain
	Ali 36'	Report	Thompson 53'; Skoko 79'; Elrich 88' (pen.)	Stadium: Bahrain National Stadium; Attendance: 2,500; Referee: Subkhiddin Mohd Salleh (Malaysia)

25 May International Friendly	Australia	1–0	Greece	Melbourne, Australia
	Skoko 16'	Report		Stadium: Melbourne Cricket Ground; Attendance: 95,103; Referee: Mike Riley (England)

4 June International Friendly	Netherlands	1–1	Australia	Rotterdam, Netherlands
	Skoko 16'	Report		Stadium: De Kuip Stadium; Attendance: 46,000; Referee: Mike Dan (England)

7 June International Friendly	Liechtenstein	1–3	Australia	Ulm, Germany
	Neill 8' (o.g.)	Report	Sterjovski 24'; Kennedy 75'; Aloisi 81'	Stadium: Donaustadion; Attendance: 5,872; Referee: Wolfgang Stark (Germany)

12 June 2006 FIFA World Cup Group F	Australia	3–1	Japan	Kaiserslautern, Germany
	Cahill 84', 89'; Aloisi 90+2'	Report	Nakamura 26'	Stadium: Fritz-Walter-Stadion; Attendance: 46,000; Referee: Essam Abdel-Fatah (Egypt)

18 June 2006 FIFA World Cup Group F	Brazil	2–0	Australia	Munich, Germany
	Adriano 49'; Fred 90'	Report		Stadium: World Cup Stadium; Attendance: 66,000; Referee: Markus Merk (Germany)

22 June 2006 FIFA World Cup Group F	Croatia	2–2	Australia	Stuttgart, Germany
	Srna 2'; Kovac 56'; Šimić (yellow card) 85' (red card); Šimunić (yellow card) (yellow card) (yellow card) 90+3' (red card) (Note: Šimunić was given three yellow cards in the match: the referee (Graham Poll) failed to send him off the pitch after the second yellow, and was only red carded after the third yellow. The original FIFA match report listed all three yellow cards, however was revised shortly after, with the second yellow card (90') not being recorded; it is unknown whether this was for consistency in the reports, or whether the card was retrospectively overturned.)	Report	Moore 38' (pen.); Kewell 79'; Emerton (yellow card) 87' (red card)	Stadium: Gottlieb-Daimler-Stadion; Attendance: 52,000; Referee: Graham Poll (England)

26 June 2006 FIFA World Cup Round of 16	Italy	1–0	Australia	Kaiserslautern, Germany
	Totti 90+5'	Report		Stadium: Fritz-Walter-Stadion; Attendance: 46,000; Referee: Graham Poll (England)

16 August 2007 AFC Asian Cup qualification Group D	Australia	2–0	Kuwait	Sydney, Australia
	Dodd 75'; Petrovski 86'	Report		Stadium: Sydney Football Stadium; Attendance: 32,622; Referee: Junjie Huang (China)

6 September 2007 AFC Asian Cup qualification Group D	Kuwait	2–0	Australia	Kuwait City, Kuwait
	Al Mutairi 55'; Al Motawaa 60'	Report		Stadium: Kaifan Sports Club Stadium; Attendance: 8,000; Referee: Toru Kamikawa (Japan)

7 October International Friendly	Australia	1–1	Paraguay	Brisbane, Australia
	Popovic 88'	Report	Beauchamp 90' (o.g.)	Stadium: Lang Park; Attendance: 47,609; Referee: Joji Kashihara (Japan)

11 October 2007 AFC Asian Cup qualification Group D	Australia	2–0	Bahrain	Sydney, Australia
	Aloisi 17'; Bresciano 24'	Report		Stadium: Sydney Football Stadium; Attendance: 36,606; Referee: Fareed Ali Mohamed Al Marzouqi (United Arab Emirates)

14 November International Friendly	Australia	1–1	Ghana	London, United Kingdom
	Aloisi 27' (pen.)	Report	Agogo 75'	Stadium: Loftus Road; Attendance: 14,379; Referee: Mark Clattenbrg (England)

=== 2007 ===
7 February International Friendly	Australia	1–3	Denmark	London, United Kingdom
	Emerton 85'	Report	Tomasson 5', 38'; Jensen 28'	Stadium: Loftus Road; Attendance: 12,476; Referee: Rob Styles (England)

24 March International Friendly	China	0–2	Australia	Guangzhou, China
		Report	Holman 8'; Bresciano 28'	Stadium: Yuexiushan Stadium; Referee: Wu Chao Jue (Hong Kong)

2 June International Friendly	Australia	1–2	Uruguay	Sydney, Australia
	Sterjovski 6'	Report	Forlan 40'; Recoba 77'	Stadium: Telstra Stadium; Attendance: 61,795; Referee: Roberto Rosetti (Italy)

30 June International Friendly	Singapore	0–3	Australia	Kallang, Singapore
		Report	Viduka 51', 88'; Kewell 76'	Stadium: National Stadium; Attendance: 45,000

8 July 2007 AFC Asian Cup Group A	Australia	1–1	Oman	Bangkok, Thailand
	Cahill 90+2'	Report	Al-Maimani 32'	Stadium: Rajamangala Stadium; Attendance: 5,000; Referee: Eddy Maillet (Seychelles)

13 July 2007 AFC Asian Cup Group A	Iraq	3–1	Australia	Bangkok, Thailand
	Akram 22'; M. Mohammed 60'; Jassim 86'	Report	Viduka 47'	Stadium: Rajamangala Stadium; Attendance: 6,000; Referee: Jasim Karim (Bahrain)

16 July 2007 AFC Asian Cup Group A	Thailand	0–4	Australia	Bangkok, Thailand
		Report	Beauchamp 21'; Viduka 80', 83'; Kewell 90'	Stadium: Rajamangala Stadium; Attendance: 6,000; Referee: Kwon Jong-Chul (South Korea)

21 July 2007 AFC Asian Cup Quarter-finals	Japan	1–1 (4–3 p)	Australia	Hanoi, Vietnam
	Takahara 72'	Report	Aloisi 70'	Stadium: Mỹ Đình National Stadium; Attendance: 6,000; Referee: Saad Kamil Al-Fadhli (Kuwait)
	Penalties
	S. Nakamura (penalty scored); Endō (penalty scored); Komano (penalty scored); Takahara (penalty missed); Nakazawa (penalty scored)		(penalty missed) Kewell; (penalty missed) Neill; (penalty scored) Cahill; (penalty scored) Carle; (penalty scored) Carney

11 September International Friendly	Australia	0–1	Argentina	Melbourne, Australia
		Report	Demichelis 49'	Stadium: Melbourne Cricket Ground; Attendance: 70,171; Referee: Saad Kamil Al-Fadhli (Kuwait)

17 November International Friendly	Australia	1–0	Nigeria	London, United Kingdom
	Carney 52'	Report		Stadium: Craven Cottage; Attendance: 11,953; Referee: Mark Clattenburg (England)

=== 2008 ===
6 February 2010 FIFA World Cup qualification Third Round	Australia	3–0	Qatar	Melbourne, Australia
19:30 UTC+11	Kennedy 11'; Cahill 17'; Bresciano 33'	Report		Stadium: Telstra Dome; Attendance: 50,969; Referee: Subkhiddin Mohd Salleh (Malaysia)

22 March International Friendly	Singapore	0–0	Australia	Kallang, Singapore
		Report		Stadium: National Stadium; Attendance: 6,282; Referee: Veerapool Prayoon (Thailand)

26 March 2010 FIFA World Cup qualification Third Round	China	0–0	Australia	Kunming, China
14:00 UTC+8		Report		Stadium: Tuodong Stadium; Attendance: 32,000; Referee: Mohamed Al Saeedi (United Arab Emirates)

23 May International Friendly	Australia	1–0	Ghana	Sydney, Australia
		Report		Stadium: Sydney Football Stadium; Attendance: 29,910; Referee: Hajime Matuso (Japan)

1 June 2010 FIFA World Cup qualification Third Round	Australia	1–0	Iraq	Brisbane, Australia
17:00 UTC+10	Kewell 47'	Report		Stadium: Suncorp Stadium; Attendance: 48,678; Referee: Ravshan Irmatov (Uzbekistan)

7 June 2010 FIFA World Cup qualification Third Round	Iraq	1–0	Australia	Dubai, United Arab Emirates
20:00 UTC+4	Mohammed 28'	Report		Stadium: Al-Rashid Stadium; Attendance: 8,000; Referee: Kazuhiko Matsumura (Japan)

14 June 2010 FIFA World Cup qualification Third Round	Qatar	1–3	Australia	Doha, Qatar
19:00 UTC+3	Al Khalfan 89'	Report	Emerton 17', 56'; Kewell 74'	Stadium: Jassim bin Hamad Stadium; Attendance: 12,000; Referee: Lee Gi-young (South Korea)

22 June 2010 FIFA World Cup qualification Third Round	Australia	0–1	China	Sydney, Australia
18:00 UTC+10		Report	Xiang 12'	Stadium: Stadium Australia; Attendance: 70,054; Referee: Khalil Al Ghamdi (Saudi Arabia)

19 August International Friendly	Australia	2–2	South Africa	London, United Kingdom
	Sterjovski 25'; Kennedy 38'	Report	Nkosi 21'; Modise 66'	Stadium: Loftus Road; Referee: Howard Webb (England)

6 September International Friendly	Netherlands	1–2	Australia	Eindhoven, Netherlands
	Huntelaar 6'	Report	Kewell 42' (pen.); Kennedy 76'	Stadium: Philips Stadion; Attendance: 22,500; Referee: Martin Atkinson (England)

10 September 2010 FIFA World Cup qualification Fourth Round	Uzbekistan	0–1	Australia	Tashkent, Uzbekistan
20:30 UTC+3		Report	Chipperfield 26'	Stadium: Pakhtakor Central Stadium; Attendance: 34,000; Referee: Saad Kamil Al-Fadhli (Kuwait)

15 October 2010 FIFA World Cup qualification Fourth Round	Australia	4–0	Qatar	Brisbane, Australia
20:00 UTC+10	Cahill 8'; Emerton 17' (pen.), 58'; Kennedy 76'	Report		Stadium: Suncorp Stadium; Attendance: 34,320; Referee: Khalil Al Ghamdi (Saudi Arabia)

19 November 2010 FIFA World Cup qualification Fourth Round	Bahrain	0–1	Australia	Madinat 'Isa, Bahrain
18:00 UTC+3		Report	Bresciano 90+3'	Stadium: Bahrain National Stadium; Attendance: 10,000; Referee: Masoud Moradi (Iran)

=== 2009 ===
28 January 2011 AFC Asian Cup qualification Group B	Indonesia	0–0	Australia	Jakarta, Indonesia
19:30 UTC+7		Report		Stadium: Sultan Qaboos Sports Complex; Attendance: 88,000; Referee: Abdul Malik Abdul Bashir (Singapore)

11 February 2010 FIFA World Cup qualification Fourth Round	Japan	0–0	Australia	Yokohama, Japan
19:20 UTC+9		Report		Stadium: International Stadium; Attendance: 66,000; Referee: Muhsen Basma (Syria)

5 March 2011 AFC Asian Cup qualification Group B	Australia	0–1	Kuwait	Canberra, Australia
20:00 UTC+11		Report	Neda 38'	Stadium: Canberra Stadium; Attendance: 20,032; Referee: Masoud Moradi (Iran)

1 April 2010 FIFA World Cup qualification Fourth Round	Australia	2–0	Uzbekistan	Sydney, Australia
20:00 UTC+11	Kennedy 66'; Kewell 73' (pen.)	Report		Stadium: Stadium Australia; Attendance: 57,292; Referee: Ali Al-Badwawi (United Arab Emirates)

6 June 2010 FIFA World Cup qualification Fourth Round	Qatar	0–0	Australia	Doha, Qatar
19:00 UTC+3		Report		Stadium: Jassim bin Hamad Stadium; Attendance: 7,000; Referee: Muhsen Basma (Singapore)

10 June 2010 FIFA World Cup qualification Fourth Round	Australia	2–0	Bahrain	Sydney, Australia
20:00 UTC+10	Sterjovski 55'; Carney 88'	Report		Stadium: Stadium Australia; Attendance: 39,540; Referee: Abdullah Al Hilali (Oman)

17 June 2010 FIFA World Cup qualification Fourth Round	Australia	2–1	Japan	Melbourne, Australia
20:00 UTC+10	Cahill 59', 77'	Report	Tulio 39'	Stadium: Melbourne Cricket Ground; Attendance: 74,100; Referee: Khalil Al Ghamdi (Saudi Arabia)

12 August International Friendly	Republic of Ireland	0–3	Australia	Limerick, Republic of Ireland
19:30 UTC+1		Report	Cahill 39', 44'; Carney 90'	Stadium: Thomond Park; Referee: Hiroshi Tezuka (Japan)

5 September International Friendly	South Korea	3–1	Australia	Seoul, South Korea
20:00 UTC+9	Park 5'; J. Lee 21'; Seol 87'	Report	Kisnorbo 33'	Stadium: Seoul World Cup Stadium; Attendance: 30,000; Referee: Subkhiddin Mohd Salleh (Malaysia)

10 October International Friendly	Australia	0–0	Netherlands	Sydney, Australia
19:30 UTC+10		Report		Stadium: Sydney Football Stadium; Attendance: 40,537

14 October 2011 AFC Asian Cup qualification Group B	Australia	1–0	Oman	Melbourne, Australia
19:30 UTC+11	Cahill 74'	Report		Stadium: Docklands Stadium; Attendance: 20,595; Referee: Maasaki Toma (Japan)

18 November 2011 AFC Asian Cup qualification Group B	Oman	1–2	Australia	Muscat, Oman
18:00 UTC+4	Ayil 15' (pen.)	Report	Wilkshire 43'; Emerton 82'	Stadium: Sultan Qaboos Sports Complex; Attendance: 12,000; Referee: Sun Baojie (China)

== 2010s ==
=== 2010 ===
6 January 2011 AFC Asian Cup qualification Group B	Kuwait	2–2	Australia	Kuwait City, Kuwait
17:30 UTC+3	Bandar 40'; Naser 44'	Report	Wilkshire 3'; Heffernan 5'	Stadium: Al Kuwait Sports Club Stadium; Attendance: 20,000; Referee: Ravshan Irmatov (Uzbekistan)

3 March 2011 AFC Asian Cup qualification Group B	Australia	1–0	Indonesia	Brisbane, Australia
19:30 UTC+10	Milligan 42'	Report		Stadium: Suncorp Stadium; Attendance: 20,422; Referee: Ogiya (Japan)

24 May International Friendly	Australia	2–1	New Zealand	Melbourne, Australia
	Vidošić 56'; Holman 90'	Report	Killen 16'	Stadium: Melbourne Cricket Ground; Attendance: 55,659; Referee: Ricardo Salazar (United States)

1 June International Friendly	Australia	1–0	Denmark	Roodepoort, South Africa
	Kennedy 71'	Report		Stadium: Ruimsig Stadium; Attendance: 6,000; Referee: Daniel Bennett (South Africa)

5 June International Friendly	Australia	1–3	United States	Roodepoort, South Africa
	Cahill 19'	Report	Buddle 4', 31'; Gomez 90'	Stadium: Ruimsig Stadium; Referee: Addul Ebrahim (South Africa)

13 June 2010 FIFA World Cup Group D	Germany	4–0	Australia	Durban, South Africa
20:30 UTC+2	Podolski 8'; Klose 26'; Müller 68'; Cacau 70'	Report		Stadium: Moses Mabhida Stadium; Attendance: 62,660; Referee: Marco Antonio Rodríguez (Mexico)

19 June 2010 FIFA World Cup Group D	Ghana	1–1	Australia	Rustenburg, South Africa
16:00 UTC+2	Gyan 25' (pen.)	Report	Holman 11'	Stadium: Royal Bafokeng Stadium; Attendance: 34,812; Referee: Roberto Rosetti (Italy)

23 June 2010 FIFA World Cup Group D	Australia	2–1	Serbia	Nelspruit, South Africa
20:30 UTC+2	Cahill 69'; Holman 73'	Report	Pantelić 84'	Stadium: Mbombela Stadium; Attendance: 37,836; Referee: Jorge Larrionda (Uruguay)

11 August International Friendly	Slovenia	2–0	Australia	Ljubljana, Slovenia
	Dedic 78'; Ljubijankic 90'	Report		Stadium: Arena Stožice; Attendance: 16,155; Referee: Paolo Tagliavento (Italy)

3 September International Friendly	Switzerland	0–0	Australia	St. Gallen, Switzerland
		Report		Stadium: AFG Arena; Attendance: 14,660; Referee: Thomas Einwaller (Austria)

7 September International Friendly	Poland	1–2	Australia	Kraków, Poland
	Lewandowski 19'	Report	Holman 14'; Wilkshire 26'	Stadium: Wisła Kraków Stadium; Attendance: 16,000

9 October International Friendly	Australia	1–0	Paraguay	Sydney, Australia
	Carney 53'	Report		Stadium: Sydney Football Stadium; Attendance: 25,210; Referee: Yuichi Nishimura (Japan)

17 November International Friendly	Egypt	3–0	Australia	Cairo, Egypt
	Abdel Zaher 18'; Gedo 60'; Zidan 90' (pen.)	Report		Stadium: Cairo International Stadium; Referee: Anton Genov (Bulgaria)

=== 2011 ===
5 January International Friendly	United Arab Emirates	0–0	Australia	Abu Dhabi, United Arab Emirates
		Report		Stadium: Khalifa bin Zayed Stadium; Attendance: Referee: Ali Shabaan (Kuwait)

10 January 2011 AFC Asian Cup Group C	India	0–4	Australia	Doha, Qatar
16:15 UTC+3		Report	Cahill 12', 62'; Kewell 25'; Holman 45'	Stadium: Jassim bin Hamad Stadium; Attendance: 9,783; Referee: Ali Al-Badwawi (United Arab Emirates)

14 January 2011 AFC Asian Cup Group C	Australia	1–1	South Korea	Doha, Qatar
16:15 UTC+3	Jedinak 62'	Report	Koo Ja-cheol 24'	Stadium: Al Gharafa Stadium; Attendance: 15,526; Referee: Abdulrahman Abdou (Qatar)

18 January 2011 AFC Asian Cup Group C	Australia	1–0	Bahrain	Doha, Qatar
16:15 UTC+3	Jedinak 37'	Report		Stadium: Jassim bin Hamad Stadium; Attendance: 3,919; Referee: Yuichi Nishimura (Japan)

22 January 2011 AFC Asian Cup Quarter-final	Australia	1–0 (a.e.t.)	Iraq	Doha, Qatar
16:25 UTC+3	Kewell 118'	Report		Stadium: Jassim bin Hamad Stadium; Attendance: 7,889; Referee: Abdulrahman Abdou (Qatar)

25 January 2011 AFC Asian Cup Semi-final	Uzbekistan	0–6	Australia	Doha, Qatar
19:25 UTC+3		Report	Kewell 5'; Ognenovski 35'; Carney 65'; Emerton 73'; Valeri 82'; Kruse 83'	Stadium: Khalifa International Stadium; Attendance: 24,826; Referee: Ali Al Badwawi (United Arab Emirates)

29 January 2011 AFC Asian Cup Final	Australia	0–1 (a.e.t.)	Japan	Doha, Qatar
18:00 UTC+3		Report	Tadanari Lee 109'	Stadium: Khalifa International Stadium; Attendance: 37,174; Referee: Ravshan Irmatov (Uzbekistan)

29 March International Friendly	Germany	1–2	Australia	Monchengladbach, Germany
	Gómez 26'	Report	Carney 61'; Wilkshire 64' (pen.)	Stadium: Borussia-Park; Attendance: 30,152; Referee: Stéphane Lannoy (France)

5 June International Friendly	Australia	3–0	New Zealand	Adelaide, Australia
	Kennedy 10', 59'; Troisi 90' (pen.)	Report		Stadium: Adelaide Oval; Attendance: 21,281; Referee: Minoru Tōjō (Japan)

7 June International Friendly	Australia	0–0	Serbia	Melbourne, Australia
		Report		Stadium: Docklands Stadium; Attendance: 28,149; Referee: Minoru Tōjō (Japan)

10 August International Friendly	Wales	1–2	Australia	Cardiff, United Kingdom
19:45 UTC	Blake 38'	Report	Cahill 44'; Kruse 60'	Stadium: Cardiff City Stadium; Attendance: 6,378; Referee: Mark Courtney (Northern Ireland)

2 September 2014 FIFA World Cup qualification Third Round	Australia	2–1	Thailand	Brisbane, Australia
20:05 UTC+10	Kennedy 58'; Brosque 86'	Report	Teerasil 15'	Stadium: Suncorp Stadium; Attendance: 24,540; Referee: Abdullah Balideh (Qatar)

6 September 2014 FIFA World Cup qualification Third Round	Saudi Arabia	1–3	Australia	Dammam, Saudi Arabia
20:30 UTC+3	Al-Shamrani 66'	Report	Kennedy 40', 56'; Wilkshire 77' (pen.)	Stadium: Prince Mohamed bin Fahd Stadium; Attendance: 15,000; Referee: Yuichi Nishimura (Japan)

7 October International Friendly	Australia	5–0	Malaysia	Canberra, Australia
19:30 UTC+11	Holman 8'; Kennedy 65'; Jedinak 85'	Report		Stadium: Canberra Stadium; Attendance: 24,732; Referee: Paul Cetrangolo (Australia)

11 October 2014 FIFA World Cup qualification Third Round	Australia	3–0	Oman	Sydney, Australia
19:00	Holman 8'; Kennedy 65'; Jedinak 85'	Report		Stadium: ANZ Stadium; Attendance: 24,732; Referee: Valentin Kovalenko (Uzbekistan)

11 October 2014 FIFA World Cup qualification Third Round	Oman	1–0	Australia	Muscat, Oman
19:00	Al-Hosni 18'	Report		Stadium: Sultan Qaboos Sports Complex; Attendance: 4,500; Referee: Ali Abdulnabi (Bahrain)

15 November 2014 FIFA World Cup qualification Third Round	Thailand	0–1	Australia	Bangkok, Thailand
18:00 UTC+7	Holman 77'	Report		Stadium: Suphachalasai Stadium; Attendance: 19,400; Referee: Saeid Mozaffarizadeh (Iran)

=== 2012 ===
29 February 2014 FIFA World Cup qualification Third Round	Australia	4–2	Saudi Arabia	Melbourne, Australia
20:30 UTC=11	Brosque 43', 75'; Kewell 73'; Emerton 76'	Report	Al-Dawsari 19'; Al-Shamrani 45+2'	Stadium: AAMI Park; Attendance: 24,240; Referee: Kim Dong-Jin (Korea Republic)

2 June International Friendly	Denmark	2–0	Australia	Copenhagen, Denmark
17:00 UTC+2	Agger 31' (pen.); Bjelland 67'	Report		Stadium: Parken Stadium; Attendance: 15,888; Referee: Antonio Damato (Italy)

8 June 2014 FIFA World Cup qualification Fourth Round	Oman	0–0	Australia	Muscat, Oman
17:00 UTC+4		Report		Stadium: Sultan Qaboos Sports Complex; Attendance: 11,000; Referee: Alireza Faghani (Iran)

12 June 2014 FIFA World Cup qualification Fourth Round	Australia	1–1	Japan	Brisbane, Australia
20:00 UTC+10	Wilkshire 70' (pen.)	Report	Kurihara 65'	Stadium: Lang Park; Attendance: 40,189; Referee: Khalil Al Ghamdi (Saudi Arabia)

2 June International Friendly	Scotland	3–1	Australia	Edinburgh, United Kingdom
20:00 UTC+1	Rhodes 28'; Davidson 63' (o.g.); McCormack 76'	Report	Bresciano 18'	Stadium: Easter Road; Attendance: 11,110; Referee: Tom Harald Hagen (Norway)

6 September International Friendly	Lebanon	0–3	Australia	Sidon, Lebanon
		Report	Cahill 20'; McKay 23'; Thompson 88'	Stadium: Saida Municipal Stadium; Attendance: 9,000~; Referee: Christos Nicolaides (Cyprus)

11 September 2014 FIFA World Cup qualification Fourth Round	Jordan	2–1	Australia	Amman, Jordan
19:00 UTC+3	Abdel-Fattah 50' (pen.); Amer Deeb 73'	Report	Thompson 86'	Stadium: King Abdullah Sports City; Attendance: 16,000; Referee: Abdullah Balideh (Qatar)

16 October 2014 FIFA World Cup qualification Fourth Round	Iraq	1–2	Australia	Doha, Qatar
17:15 UTC+3	Abdul-Zahra 72'	Report	Cahill 80'; Thompson 84'	Stadium: Grand Hamad Stadium; Attendance: 2,183; Referee: Lee Min-Hu (Korea Republic)

14 November International Friendly	South Korea	1–2	Australia	Hwaseong, South Korea
	Lee 12'	Report	Rukavytsya 44'; Cornthwaite 88'	Stadium: Hwaseong Sports Town; Attendance: 21,618; Referee: Wang Zhe (China)

3 December 2013 EAFF East Asian Cup Preliminary Round 2	Hong Kong	0–1	Australia	Kowloon, Hong Kong
		Report	Emerton 85'	Stadium: Mong Kok Stadium; Attendance: 4,160; Referee: Jumpei Iida (Japan)

7 December 2013 EAFF East Asian Cup Preliminary Round 2	North Korea	1–1	Australia	Causeway Bay, Hong Kong
	An 65'	Report	Thompson 4'	Stadium: Hong Kong Stadium; Attendance: 989; Referee: Mongkolchai Pechsri (Thailand)

5 December 2013 EAFF East Asian Cup Preliminary Round 2	Guam	0–9	Australia	Causeway Bay, Hong Kong
		Report	Mooy 14'; Babalj 21', 56'; Marrone 44'; Thompson 59', 62', 68' (pen.); Milligan 74'; Garcia 86'	Stadium: Hong Kong Stadium; Attendance: 989; Referee: Wong Zhe (Chinese)

9 December 2013 EAFF East Asian Cup Preliminary Round 2	Chinese Taipei	0–8	Australia	Causeway Bay, Hong Kong
		Report	Garcia 11'; Cornthwaite 18'; Taggart 20', 30'; Behich 20', 30'; Behich 34', 57'; Mooy 47'; Yang 82' (o.g.)	Stadium: Hong Kong Stadium; Attendance: 989; Referee: Wong Zhe (Chinese)

=== 2013 ===
6 February International Friendly	Romania	3–2	Australia	Málaga, Spain
	Tanase 35'; Stancu 76'; Torje 84'	Report	Wilkshire 45' (pen.); Cornthwaite 54'	Stadium: Estadio Ciudad de Málaga; Attendance: 200; Referee: Carlos Velasco Carballo (Spain)

26 March 2014 FIFA World Cup qualification Fourth Round	Australia	2–2	Oman	Sydney, Australia
19:30 UTC+11	Cahill 52'; Holman 85'	Report	Al-Muqbali 7'; Jedinak 49' (o.g.)	Stadium: Stadium Australia; Attendance: 34,603; Referee: Ravshan Irmatov (Uzbekistan)

4 June 2014 FIFA World Cup qualification Fourth Round	Japan	1–1	Australia	Saitama Prefecture, Japan
19:30 UTC+9	Honda 90' (pen.)	Report	Oar 82'	Stadium: Saitama Stadium 2002; Attendance: 62,172; Referee: Ravshan Irmatov (Uzbekistan)

11 June 2014 FIFA World Cup qualification Fourth Round	Australia	4–0	Jordan	Melbourne, Australia
19:00 UTC+10	Bresciano 15'; Cahill 61'; Kruse 76'; Neill 84'	Report		Stadium: Docklands Stadium; Attendance: 43,785; Referee: Abdul Malik Abdul Bashir (Singapore)

18 June 2014 FIFA World Cup qualification Fourth Round	Australia	1–0	Iraq	Sydney, Australia
19:30 UTC+10	Kennedy 83'	Report		Stadium: Stadium Australia; Attendance: 80,532; Referee: Alireza Faghani (Iran)

20 July 2013 EAFF East Asian Cup	South Korea	0–0	Australia	Seoul, South Korea
19:00 UTC+9		Report		Stadium: Seoul World Cup Stadium; Attendance: 31,571; Referee: Yuichi Nishimura (Japan)

25 July 2013 EAFF East Asian Cup	Japan	3–2	Australia	Seoul, South Korea
20:00 UTC+9	Saito 26'; Osako 56', 79'	Report	Duke 76'; Juric 78'	Stadium: Seoul World Cup Stadium; Attendance: 1,458; Referee: Tan Hai (China PR)

28 July 2013 EAFF East Asian Cup	Australia	3–4	China	Seoul, South Korea
17:15 UTC+9	Mooy 30'; Taggart 89'; Duke 90+3'	Report	Yu Dabao 5'; Sun Ke 56'; Yang Xu 87'; Wu Lei	Stadium: Seoul World Cup Stadium; Attendance: 10,526; Referee: Kim Dong-jin (South Korea)

7 September International Friendly	Brazil	6–0	Australia	Brasília, Brazil
	Jô 8', 34'; Neymar 36'; Ramires 58'; Pato 73'; Luiz Gustavo 84'	Report		Stadium: Estádio Nacional Mané Garrincha; Attendance: 40,996; Referee: Enrique Cáceres (Paraguay)

11 October International Friendly	France	6–0	Australia	Paris, France
21:00 UTC+2	Ribéry 8'; Giroud 16', 27'; Cabaye 29'; Debuchy 47'; Benzema 51'	Report		Stadium: Parc des Princes; Attendance: 38,000; Referee: Artur Soares Dias (Portugal)

15 October International Friendly	Australia	3–0	Canada	London, United Kingdom
21:00 UTC+2	Kennedy 1'; Vidošić 52'; Leckie 79'	Report		Stadium: Craven Cottage; Attendance: 3,741; Referee: Mike Dean (England)

19 November International Friendly	Australia	1–0	Costa Rica	Sydney, Australia
21:00 UTC+2	Cahill 69'	Report		Stadium: Sydney Football Stadium; Attendance: 20,165; Referee: Hiroyoshi Takayama (Japan)

=== 2014 ===
5 March International Friendly	Australia	3–4	Ecuador	London, United Kingdom
20:00	Cahill 8', 31'; Jedinak 15' (pen.)	Report	Martínez 56'; Castillo 60' (pen.); E.Valencia 76'; Méndez 90+1'	Stadium: The Den; Attendance: 7,133; Referee: Lee Probert (England)

26 May International Friendly	Australia	1–1	South Africa	Sydney, Australia
19:30	Cahill 14'	Report	Patosi 13'	Stadium: Stadium Australia; Attendance: 50,468; Referee: Kim Jong-hyeok (South Korea)

13 June 2014 FIFA World Cup Group B	Chile	3–1	Australia	Cuiabá, Brazil
18:00 UTC−4	Sánchez 12'; Valdivia 14'; Beausejour 90+2'	Report	Cahill 35'	Stadium: Arena Pantanal; Attendance: 40,275; Referee: Noumandiez Doué (Ivory Coast)

18 June 2014 FIFA World Cup Group B	Australia	2–3	Netherlands	Porto Alegre, Brazil
13:00 UTC−3	Cahill 21'; Jedinak 54'	Report	Robben 20'; van Persie 58'; Depay 68'	Stadium: Estádio Beira-Rio; Attendance: 42,877; Referee: Djamel Haimoudi (Algeria)

18 June 2014 FIFA World Cup Group B	Australia	0–3	Spain	Curitiba, Brazil
13:00 UTC−3		Report	Villa 36'; Torres 69'; Mata 82'	Stadium: Arena da Baixada; Attendance: 39,375; Referee: Nawaf Shukralla (Bahrain)

4 September International Friendly	Belgium	2–0	Australia	Liège, Belgium
04:05	Mertens 18'; Witsel 77'	Report		Stadium: Stade Maurice Dufrasne; Attendance: 16,850; Referee: Michael Oliver

8 September International Friendly	Saudi Arabia	2–3	Australia	London, United Kingdom
20:00 UTC+1	Fallatah 71' (pen.); Al-Jassim 84'	Report	Cahill 3'; Jedinak 6'; Wright 77'	Stadium: Craven Cottage; Attendance: 3,677; Referee: Martin Atkinson (England)

11 October International Friendly	United Arab Emirates	0–0	Australia	Abu Dhabi, United Arab Emirates
18:30 UTC+4		Report		Stadium: Mohammed bin Zayed Stadium; Attendance: 1,000; Referee: Vladislav Tseytlin (Uzbekistan)

15 October International Friendly	Qatar	1–0	Australia	Doha, Qatar
19:00 UTC+3	Ibrahim 61'	Report		Stadium: Abdullah bin Khalifa Stadium; Attendance: 2,000; Referee: Ahmad Ibrahim (Jordan)

18 November International Friendly	Japan	2–1	Australia	Osaka, Japan
19:20 UTC+9	Konno 61'; Okazaki 68'	Report	Cahill 90+2'	Stadium: Yanmar Stadium Nagai; Attendance: 46,312; Referee: Paweł Gil (Poland)

=== 2015 ===
9 January 2015 AFC Asian Cup Group A	Australia	4–1	Kuwait	Melbourne, Australia
20:00 UTC+11	Cahill 33'; Luongo 44'; Jedinak 62' (pen.); Troisi 90+2'	Report	Hakem 8'	Stadium: AAMI Park; Attendance: 25,231; Referee: Ravshan Irmatov (Uzbekistan)

13 January 2015 AFC Asian Cup Group A	Oman	0–4	Australia	Sydney, Australia
20:00 UTC+11		Report	McKay 27'; Kruse 30'; Milligan 45+3' (pen.); Juric 70'	Stadium: Stadium Australia; Attendance: 46,067; Referee: Ryuji Sato (Japan)

13 January 2015 AFC Asian Cup Group A	Australia	0–1	South Korea	Brisbane, Australia
19:00 UTC+10		Report	Lee 32'	Stadium: Suncorp Stadium; Attendance: 48,513; Referee: Nawaf Shukralla (Bahrain)

22 January 2015 AFC Asian Cup Quarter-final	China	0–2	Australia	Brisbane, Australia
20:30 UTC+10		Report	Cahill 49', 65'	Stadium: Suncorp Stadium; Attendance: 46,067; Referee: Kim Jong-hyeok (South Korea)

27 January 2015 AFC Asian Cup Semi-final	Australia	2–0	United Arab Emirates	Newcastle, Australia
20:00 UTC+11	Sainsbury 3'; Davidson 14'	Report		Stadium: McDonald Jones Stadium; Attendance: 21,079; Referee: Ravshan Irmatov (Uzbekistan)

17 January 2015 AFC Asian Cup Final	South Korea	1–2 (a.e.t.)	Australia	Sydney, Australia
20:00 UTC+11	Son 90+1'	Report	Luongo 45'; Troisi 105'	Stadium: Stadium Australia; Attendance: 76,385; Referee: Alireza Faghani (Iran)

25 March International Friendly	Germany	2–2	Australia	Kaiserslautern, Germany
20:30 UTC+1	Reus 17'; Podolski 81'	Report	Troisi 40'; Jedinak 50'	Stadium: Fritz-Walter-Stadion; Attendance: 47,106; Referee: Michael Oliver (England)

31 March International Friendly	Macedonia	0–0	Australia	Skopje, Macedonia
19:00 UTC		Report		Stadium: Toše Proeski Arena; Attendance: 2,000; Referee: Michael Oliver (England)

16 June 2018 FIFA World Cup qualification Second Round	Kyrgyzstan	1–2	Australia	Bishkek, Kyrgyzstan
20:00 UTC+6	Mirzaliev 90+2'	Report	Jedinak 1'; Oar 67'	Stadium: Spartak Stadium; Attendance: 18,000; Referee: Khamis Al-Marri (Qatar)

3 September 2018 FIFA World Cup qualification Second Round	Australia	5–0	Bangladesh	Perth, Australia
19:00 UTC+8	Leckie 6'; Rogic 8', 20'; Burns 29'; Mooy 61'	Report		Stadium: Perth Oval; Attendance: 19,495; Referee: Võ Minh Trí (Vietnam)

8 September 2018 FIFA World Cup qualification Second Round	Tajikistan	0–3	Australia	Dushanbe, Tajikistan
18:00 UTC+5		Report	Milligan 57'; Cahill 73', 90+1'	Stadium: Pamir Stadium; Attendance: 19,000; Referee: Jameel Abdulhusin (Bahrain)

8 October 2018 FIFA World Cup qualification Second Round	Jordan	2–0	Australia	Amman, Jordan
18:00 UTC+5	Abdel-Fattah 47' (pen.); Al-Dardour 84'	Report		Stadium: Amman International Stadium; Attendance: 11,462; Referee: Masaaki Toma (Japan)

12 November 2018 FIFA World Cup qualification Second Round	Australia	3–0	Kyrgyzstan	Canberra, Australia
20:00 UTC+11	Jedinak 40' (pen.); Cahill 50'; Amirov 69' (o.g.)	Report		Stadium: Canberra Stadium; Attendance: 19,412; Referee: Kim Sang-woo (South Korea)

17 November 2018 FIFA World Cup qualification Second Round	Bangladesh	0–4	Australia	Dhaka, Bangladesh
17:30 UTC+6		Report	Cahill 6', 32', 37'; Jedinak 43'	Stadium: Bangabandhu National Stadium; Attendance: 19,730; Referee: Wang Di (China)

=== 2016 ===
24 March 2018 FIFA World Cup qualification Second Round	Australia	7–0	Tajikistan	Adelaide, Australia
19:30 UTC+10:30	Luongo 3'; Jedinak 13' (pen.); Milligan 57' (pen.); Burns 67', 87'; Rogic 70', 72'	Report		Stadium: Adelaide Oval; Attendance: 35,439; Referee: Fahad Al-Marri (Qatar)

29 March 2018 FIFA World Cup qualification Second Round	Australia	5–1	Jordan	Sydney, Australia
20:00 UTC+11	Cahill 24', 44'; Mooy 39'; Rogic 53'; Luongo 69'	Report	Deeb 90'	Stadium: Sydney Football Stadium; Attendance: 24,975; Referee: Kim Jong-hyeok (South Korea)

28 May International Friendly	England	2–1	Australia	Sunderland, United Kingdom
19:45 UTC+1	Rashford 3'; Rooney 55'	Report	Dier 75' (o.g.)	Stadium: Stadium of Light; Attendance: 46,595; Referee: Danny Makkelie (Netherlands)

4 June International Friendly	Australia	1–0	Greece	Sydney, Australia
20:00 UTC+10	Leckie 90+3'	Report		Stadium: Stadium Australia; Attendance: 38,682; Referee: Jumpei Iida (Japan)

7 June International Friendly	Australia	1–2	Greece	Melbourne, Australia
20:00 UTC+10	Sainsbury 58'	Report	Mantalos 8'; Maniatis 20'	Stadium: Docklands Stadium; Attendance: 33,622; Referee: Bobby Madley (England)

1 September 2018 FIFA World Cup qualification Third Round	Australia	2–0	Iraq	Perth, Australia
18:30 UTC+8	Luongo 58'; Juric 64'	Report		Stadium: Perth Oval; Attendance: 18,923; Referee: Alireza Faghani (Iran)

6 September 2018 FIFA World Cup qualification Third Round	United Arab Emirates	0–1	Australia	Abu Dhabi, United Arab Emirates
19:30 UTC+4		Report	Cahill 75'	Stadium: Mohammed Bin Zayed Stadium; Attendance: 40,893; Referee: Mohd Amirul Izwan Yaacob (Malaysia)

6 October 2018 FIFA World Cup qualification Third Round	Saudi Arabia	2–2	Australia	Jeddah, Saudi Arabia
20:45 UTC+3	Al-Jassim 5'; Al-Shamrani 79'	Report	Sainsbury 45'; Juric 71'	Stadium: King Abdullah Sports City; Attendance: 51,616; Referee: Ravshan Irmatov (Uzbekistan)

11 October 2018 FIFA World Cup qualification Third Round	Australia	1–1	Japan	Melbourne, Australia
20:00 UTC+11	Jedinak 52' (pen.)	Report	Haraguchi 5'	Stadium: Docklands Stadium; Attendance: 48,460; Referee: Nawaf Shukralla (Bahrain)

15 November 2018 FIFA World Cup qualification Third Round	Thailand	2–2	Australia	Bangkok, Thailand
19:00 UTC+7	Teerasil 20', 57' (pen.)	Report	Jedinak 9' (pen.), 65' (pen.)	Stadium: Rajamangala Stadium; Attendance: 36,534; Referee: Fahad Al-Marri (Qatar)

=== 2017 ===
23 March 2018 FIFA World Cup qualification Third Round	Iraq	1–1	Australia	Tehran, Iran
	Yasin 76'	Report	Leckie 40'	Stadium: PAS Stadium; Attendance: 3,270; Referee: Kim Jong-hyeok (South Korea)

28 March 2018 FIFA World Cup qualification Third Round	Australia	2–0	United Arab Emirates	Sydney, Australia
	Irvine 7'; Leckie 78'	Report		Stadium: Sydney Football Stadium; Attendance: 27,328; Referee: Ahmed Al-Kaf (Oman)

8 June 2018 FIFA World Cup qualification Third Round	Australia	3–2	Saudi Arabia	Adelaide, Australia
	Juric 7', 36'; Rogic 64'	Report	Al-Dawsari 23'; Al-Sahlawi 45+2'	Stadium: Adelaide Oval; Attendance: 29,875; Referee: Ravshan Irmatov (Uzbekistan)

13 June International Friendly	Australia	0–4	Brazil	Melbourne, Australia
		Report	Souza 1', 90+3'; Silva 62'; Taison 75'	Stadium: Melbourne Cricket Ground; Attendance: 49,874; Referee: Mark Clattenburg (England)

19 June 2017 FIFA Confederations Cup Group B	Australia	2–3	Germany	Sochi, Russia
	Rogic 41'; Juric 56'	Report	Stindl 5'; Draxler 44' (pen.); Goretzka 48'	Stadium: Fisht Stadium; Attendance: 28,605; Referee: Mark Geiger (United States)

22 June 2017 FIFA Confederations Cup Group B	Cameroon	1–1	Australia	Saint Petersburg, Russia
	Zambo Anguissa 45'	Report	Milligan 60' (pen.)	Stadium: Saint Petersburg Stadium; Attendance: 35,021; Referee: Milorad Mažić (Serbia)

25 June 2017 FIFA Confederations Cup Group B	Chile	1–1	Australia	Moscow, Russia
	Rodríguez 67'	Report	Troisi 42'	Stadium: Spartak Stadium; Attendance: 33,639; Referee: Gianluca Rocchi (Italy)

31 August 2018 FIFA World Cup qualification Third Round	Japan	2–0	Australia	Saitama Prefecture, Japan
	Asano 41'; Ideguchi 82'	Report		Stadium: Saitama Stadium; Attendance: 59,492; Referee: Alireza Faghani (Iran)

5 September 2018 FIFA World Cup qualification Third Round	Australia	2–1	Thailand	Melbourne, Australia
	Juric 69'; Leckie 86'	Report	Anan 82'	Stadium: Melbourne Rectangular Stadium; Attendance: 26,393; Referee: Liu Kwok Man (Hong Kong)

5 October 2018 FIFA World Cup qualification Fourth Round	Syria	1–1	Australia	Malacca, Malaysia
	Al Soma 85' (pen.)	Report	Kruse 40'	Stadium: Hang Jebat Stadium; Attendance: 2,150; Referee: Alireza Faghani (Iran)

10 October 2018 FIFA World Cup qualification Fourth Round	Australia	2–1	Syria	Sydney, Australia
	Cahill 13', 109'	Report	Al Soma 6'	Stadium: Sydney Olympic Stadium; Attendance: 42,136; Referee: Ravshan Irmatov (Uzbekistan)

9 November 2018 FIFA World Cup qualification Intercontinental play-offs	Honduras	0–0	Australia	San Pedro Sula, Honduras
		Report		Stadium: Estadio Olímpico Metropolitano; Attendance: 38,000; Referee: Daniele Orsato (Italy)

15 November 2018 FIFA World Cup qualification Intercontinental play-offs	Australia	3–1	Honduras	Sydney, Australia
	Jedinak 53', 72' (pen.), 85' (pen.)	Report	M. Figueroa 90+4'	Stadium: Sydney Olympic Stadium; Attendance: 77,060; Referee: Néstor Pitana (Argentina)

=== 2018 ===
23 March International Friendly	Norway	4–1	Australia	Oslo, Norway
	Kamara 36', 57', 90'; Reginiussen 48'	Report	Irvine 19'	Stadium: Ullevaal Stadion; Attendance: 5,871; Referee: Andreas Ekberg (Sweden)

27 March International Friendly	Colombia	0–0	Australia	London, United Kingdom
		Report		Stadium: Craven Cottage; Attendance: 18,664; Referee: Robert Madley (England)

1 June International Friendly	Australia	4–0	Czech Republic	Sankt Pölten, Austria
	Leckie 32', 72'; Nabbout 54'; Jugas 80' (o.g.)	Report		Stadium: NV Arena; Attendance: 665; Referee: Alexander Harkam (Austria)

9 June International Friendly	Hungary	1–2	Australia	Budapest, Hungary
	Sainsbury 88' (o.g.)	Report	Arzani 74'; Kadar 90' (o.g.)	Stadium: Groupama Arena; Attendance: 10,091; Referee: Matej Jug (Slovenia)

16 June 2018 FIFA World Cup Group C	France	2–1	Australia	Kazan, Russia
	Griezmann 58' (pen.); Behich 80' (o.g.)	Report	Jedinak 62' (pen.)	Stadium: Kazan Stadium; Attendance: 41,279; Referee: Andres Cunha (Uruguay)

21 June 2018 FIFA World Cup Group C	Denmark	1–1	Australia	Samara, Russia
	Eriksen 7'	Report	Jedinak 38' (pen.)	Stadium: Samara Arena; Attendance: 40,727; Referee: Antonio Mateu (Spain)

26 June 2018 FIFA World Cup Group C	Australia	0–2	Peru	Sochi, Russia
		Report	Carrillo 18'; Guerrero 50'	Stadium: Fisht Stadium; Attendance: 44,073; Referee: Sergei Karasev (Russia)

15 October International Friendly	Kuwait	0–4	Australia	Kuwait City, Kuwait
		Report	Ibrahim 12' (o.g.); Giannou 21'; Rogic 82'; Mabil 88'	Stadium: Al Kuwait Sports Club Stadium; Attendance: 44,073; Referee: Yaqoob Said Abdullah Abdul Baqi (Oman)

17 November International Friendly	Australia	1–1	South Korea	Brisbane, Australia
18:50 UTC+10	Luongo 90+4'	Report	Ui-jo 22'	Stadium: Suncorp Stadium; Attendance: 32,922; Referee: Jumpei Iida (Japan)

20 November International Friendly	Australia	3–0	Lebanon	Sydney, Australia
19:30 UTC+11	Boyle 19', 41'; Leckie 68'	Report		Stadium: Sydney Olympic Stadium; Attendance: 33,268; Referee: Ryuji Sato (Japan)

30 December International Friendly	Australia	5–0	Oman	Dubai, United Arab Emirates
	Nabbout 10'; Ikonomidis 14'; Mabil 24'; Degenek 58'; Irvine 89'	Report		Stadium: Maktoum bin Rashid Al Maktoum Stadium; Attendance: 0 (behind closed doors); Referee: Omar Mohamed Al Ali (United Arab Emirates)

=== 2019 ===
6 January 2019 AFC Asian Cup Group B	Australia	0–1	Jordan	Al Ain, United Arab Emirates
15:00 UTC+4		Report	Bani Yaseen 26'	Stadium: Hazza bin Zayed Stadium; Attendance: 4,934; Referee: Ahmed Al-Kaf (Oman)

11 January 2019 AFC Asian Cup Group B	Palestine	0–3	Australia	Dubai, United Arab Emirates
15:00 UTC+4		Report	Maclaren 18'; Mabil 20'; Giannou 90'	Stadium: Rashid Stadium; Attendance: 11,915; Referee: Valentin Kovalenko (Uzbekistan)

11 January 2019 AFC Asian Cup Group B	Australia	3–2	Syria	Al Ain, United Arab Emirates
17:30 UTC+4	Mabil 41'; Ikonomidis 54'; Rogic 90+3'	Report	Kharbin 43'; Al Somah 80' (pen.)	Stadium: Rashid Stadium; Attendance: 10,492; Referee: César Arturo Ramos (Mexico)

11 January 2019 AFC Asian Cup Round of 16	Australia	0–0 (4–2 p)	Uzbekistan	Al Ain, United Arab Emirates
18:00 UTC+4		Report	(penalty scored) Shukurov; (penalty missed) Tukhtakhodjaev; (penalty scored) Alibaev; (penalty missed) Bikmaev	Stadium: Khalifa bin Zayed Stadium; Attendance: 6,809; Referee: Abdulrahman Al-Jassim (Qatar)
	Penalties
	Milligan (penalty scored); Behich (penalty missed); Kruse (penalty scored); Giannou (penalty scored); Leckie (penalty scored)

26 January 2019 AFC Asian Cup Quarter-finals	United Arab Emirates	1–0	Australia	Al Ain, United Arab Emirates
20:00 UTC+4	Mabkhout 68'	Report		Stadium: Hazza bin Zayed Stadium; Attendance: 25,053; Referee: Ryuji Sato (Japan)

7 June International Friendly	South Korea	1–0	Australia	Busan, South Korea
20:00 UTC+9	Ui-jo 76'	Report		Stadium: Busan Asiad Stadium; Attendance: 52,213; Referee: Minoru Tojo (Japan)

10 September 2023 ACQ / 2022 WCQ	Kuwait	0–3	Australia	Kuwait City, Kuwait
		Report	Leckie 7', 30'; Mooy 38'	Stadium: Al Kuwait Sports Club Stadium; Attendance: 11,852; Referee: Muhammad Taqi (Singapore)

10 October 2023 ACQ / 2022 WCQ	Australia	5–0	Nepal	Canberra, Australia
	Maclaren 6', 19', 90'; Souttar 23', 59'	Report		Stadium: Bruce Stadium; Attendance: 18,563; Referee: Thoriq Munir Alkatiri (Indonesia)

15 October 2023 ACQ / 2022 WCQ	Chinese Taipei	1–7	Australia	Kaohsiung, Taiwan
		Report	Taggart 12', 19'; Irvine 34', 37'; Souttar 73', 89'; Maclaren 84'	Stadium: National Stadium; Attendance: 3,251

14 November 2023 ACQ / 2022 WCQ	Jordan	0–1	Australia	Amman, Jordan
		Report	Taggart 13'	Stadium: King Abdullah II Stadium; Attendance: 9,712; Referee: Fu Ming (China)

== See also ==
- Australia men's national soccer team results (2020–present)
- Australia men's national soccer team results (1980–1999)
- Australia men's national soccer team results (1950–1979)
- Australia men's national soccer team results (1922–1949)
- Australia men's national soccer team results (unofficial matches)
- Australia men's national soccer B team matches
