= 2004 Australia national soccer team season =

Australia
2004 season
- Manager: Frank Farina

This page summarises the Australia national soccer team fixtures and results in 2004.

== Summary ==
2004 commenced with a trip to Venezuela for a first ever meeting with the Venezuela national football team in a friendly which finished 1–1 after an injury time equaliser to the hosts. This was followed by a 1–0 friendly win in London over South Africa. Following this Australia hosted Turkey in a two-match friendly series. The Turks were ranked 7th in the world at the time and won both fixtures, 3–1 in Sydney and then 1–0 in Melbourne.

In late May and early June Australia hosted the final tournament of the 2004 OFC Nations Cup in Adelaide. The tournament doubled as qualification for the 2006 FIFA World Cup. Australia largely cruised through their matches although a surprise 2–2 draw with Solomon Islands in the last game meant the two nations would meet again in a two-legged playoff to determine the OFC Nations champions.

These fixtures took place in October. Australia comfortably won both legs. A 5–1 win in Honiara was followed with a 6–0 win in Sydney to be crowned OFC Nations champions and qualify for the 2005 FIFA Confederations Cup.

The year ended with a 2–2 friendly draw in London to Norway.

== Record ==
Type	GP	W	D	L	GF	GA
Friendly matches	5	1	2	2	5	7
OFC Nations Cup and World Cup qualifiers	7	6	1	0	32	4
Total	12	7	3	2	37	11

== Match results ==
=== Friendlies ===
18 February Friendly	Venezuela	1–1	Australia	Caracas, Venezuela
	Arango 92'		18' Agostino	Stadium: Estadio Olímpico; Attendance: 12,000; Referee: Oscar Julian Ruiz (Colombia)

30 March Friendly	Australia	1–0	South Africa	London, England
	Bresciano 19'			Stadium: Loftus Road; Attendance: 16,108; Referee: Mark Halsey (England)

21 May Friendly	Australia	1–3	Turkey	Sydney, Australia
	Bresciano 47' (pen.)		42' Özat; 69', 75' Şükür	Stadium: Sydney Football Stadium; Attendance: 28,326; Referee: Toru Kamikawa (Japan)

24 May Friendly	Australia	0–1	Turkey	Melbourne, Australia
			Kahveci 42'	Stadium: Telstra Dome; Attendance: 28,953; Referee: Derek Rugg (New Zealand)

16 November Friendly	Australia	2–2	Norway	London, England
	Cahill 44'; Skoko 58'		40' Iversen; 72' Pedersen	Stadium: Craven Cottage; Attendance: 7,364; Referee: Rob Styles (England)

=== OFC Nations Cup & World Cup Qualifiers ===
29 May Group Stage	Australia	1–0	New Zealand	Adelaide, Australia
	Bresciano 40'			Stadium: Hindmarsh Stadium; Attendance: 12,130; Referee: Claus Bo Larsen (Denmark)

31 May Group Stage	Australia	9–0	Tahiti	Adelaide, Australia
	Cahill 14', 47'; Skoko 43'; Simon 44' (o.g.); Sterjovski 51', 61', 74'; Zdrilic 85'; Chipperfield 89'			Stadium: Hindmarsh Stadium; Attendance: 1,200; Referee: Harry Attison (Vanuatu)

2 June Group Stage	Australia	6–1	Fiji	Adelaide, Australia
	Madaschi 6', 50'; Cahill 39', 66', 75'; Elrich 89'		19' Gataurua	Stadium: Marden Sports Complex; Attendance: 2,200; Referee: Eduardo Iturralde González (Spain)

4 June Group Stage	Australia	3–0	Vanuatu	Adelaide, Australia
	Aloisi 25', 85'; Emerton 81'			Stadium: Hindmarsh Stadium; Attendance: 4,000; Referee: Charles Ariiotima (Tahiti)

6 June Group Stage	Australia	2–2	Solomon Islands	Adelaide, Australia
	Cahill 50'; Emerton 52'		43', 75' Menapi	Stadium: Hindmarsh Stadium; Attendance: 3,500; Referee: Eduardo Iturralde González (Spain)

9 October Final 1st Leg	Solomon Islands	1–5	Australia	Honiara, Solomon Islands
	Suri 60'		5', 28' Skoko; 19' Milicic; 43' Emerton; 79' Elrich	Stadium: Lawson Tama Stadium; Attendance: 21,000; Referee: Peter O'Leary (New Zealand)

12 October Final 2nd Leg	Australia	6–0	Solomon Islands	Sydney, Australia
	Milicic 5'; Kewell 8'; Vidmar 60'; Thompson 79'; Elrich 82'; Emerton 89'	(Report)	60' Suri	Stadium: Sydney Football Stadium; Attendance: 19,208; Referee: Leone Rakaroi (Fiji)

== Goal scorers ==
Player	Friendlies	OFC Nations Cup	Total Goals
Cahill	1	6	7
Emerton	-	4	4
Skoko	1	3	4
Bresciano	2	1	3
Elrich	-	3	3
Sterjovski	-	3	3
Aloisi	-	2	2
Madaschi	-	2	2
Milicic	-	2	2
Agostino	1	-	1
Chipperfield	-	1	1
Kewell	-	1	1
Thompson	-	1	1
Vidmar	-	1	1
Zdrilic	-	1	1
