= 2006 FIFA World Cup qualification – OFC first round =

First round of the OFC qualification process for the 2006 FIFA World Cup

Listed below are the dates and results for the 2006 FIFA World Cup qualification first round for Oceania.

== Participating teams ==
The below 10 teams were divided in two groups of five teams each, and played against each other once. The two teams with most points in each group advanced to the Second round.

- American Samoa
- Cook Islands
- Fiji
- New Caledonia
- Papua New Guinea
- Samoa
- Solomon Islands
- Tahiti
- Tonga
- Vanuatu

New Caledonia was not a member of FIFA at the time of the draw, and only joined FIFA when its participation in the first round, and in the 2006 World Cup qualifications, had ended.

== Matches ==
=== Group 1 ===
All matches were held in Honiara, Solomon Islands (UTC+11)

Pos	Team	Pld	W	D	L	GF	GA	GD	Pts	Qualification	Solomon Islands national football team	Tahiti national football team	New Caledonia national football team	Tonga national football team	Cook Islands national football team
1	Solomon Islands (H)	4	3	1	0	14	1	+13	10	Advance to 2004 OFC Nations Cup	—	1–1	2–0	6–0	5–0
2	Tahiti	4	2	2	0	5	1	+4	8	Advance to 2004 OFC Nations Cup	—	—	0–0	2–0	2–0
3	New Caledonia	4	2	1	1	16	2	+14	7		—	—	—	8–0	8–0
4	Tonga	4	1	0	3	2	17	−15	3		—	—	—	—	2–1
5	Cook Islands	4	0	0	4	1	17	−16	0		—	—	—	—	—

Source: FIFA
(H) Hosts
10 May 2004
14:00

Solomon Islands	6–0	Tonga
Fa'arodo 12', 30', 77'; Maemae 62', 76'; Samani 79'	Report

Lawson Tama, Honiara
Attendance: 12,385
Referee: Harry Attison (Vanuatu)
10 May 2004
16:00

Tahiti	2–0	Cook Islands
Temataua 2'; Moretta 80'	Report

Lawson Tama, Honiara
Attendance: 12,000
Referee: Rajendra Singh (Fiji)

12 May 2004
14:00

Solomon Islands	5–0	Cook Islands
Waita 21'; Omokirio 27'; Samani 45'; Maemae 70'; Leslie 81'	Report

Lawson Tama, Honiara
Attendance: 14,000
Referee: Lencie Fred (Vanuatu)
12 May 2004
16:00

Tahiti	0–0	New Caledonia
	Report

Lawson Tama, Honiara
Attendance: 14,000
Referee: Leone Rakaroi (Fiji)

15 May 2004
14:00

Tonga	2–1	Cook Islands
Uhatahi 46'; Vaitaki 61'	Report	Pareanga 59'

Lawson Tama, Honiara
Attendance: 15,000
Referee: Salaiau Sosongan (Papua New Guinea)
15 May 2004
16:00

Solomon Islands	2–0	New Caledonia
Omokirio 10'; G. Suri 42'	Report

Lawson Tama, Honiara
Attendance: 20,000
Referee: Harry Attison (Vanuatu)

17 May 2004
14:00

New Caledonia	8–0	Cook Islands
P. Wajoka 3'; M. Hmae 20', 40', 42', 52', 85'; Djamali 25'; J. Hmae 35'	Report

Lawson Tama, Honiara
Attendance: 400
Referee: Rajendra Singh (Fiji)
17 May 2004
16:00

Tahiti	2–0	Tonga
G. Wajoka 1'; Temataua 78'	Report

Lawson Tama, Honiara
Attendance: 400
Referee: Salaiau Sosongan (Papua New Guinea)

19 May 2004
14:00

New Caledonia	8–0	Tonga
J. Hmae 4'; Poatinda 26', 42', 79'; M. Hmae 45'; P. Wajoka 54', 58'; Kaumé 72'	Report

Lawson Tama, Honiara
Attendance: 14,000
Referee: Lencie Fred (Vanuatu)
19 May 2004
16:00

Solomon Islands	1–1	Tahiti
B. Suri 80'	Report	Simon 30'

Lawson Tama, Honiara
Attendance: 18,000
Referee: Leone Rakaroi (Fiji)

=== Group 2 ===
All games were held in Apia, Samoa.

Pos	Team	Pld	W	D	L	GF	GA	GD	Pts	Qualification	Vanuatu national football team	Fiji national football team	Papua New Guinea national soccer team	Samoa national football team	American Samoa national football team
1	Vanuatu	4	3	1	0	16	2	+14	10	Advance to 2004 OFC Nations Cup	—	—	—	—	—
2	Fiji	4	3	0	1	19	5	+14	9	Advance to 2004 OFC Nations Cup	0–3	—	4–2	—	11–0
3	Papua New Guinea	4	2	1	1	17	6	+11	7		1–1	—	—	—	—
4	Samoa (H)	4	1	0	3	5	11	−6	3		0–3	0–4	1–4	—	4–0
5	American Samoa	4	0	0	4	1	34	−33	0		1–9	—	0–10	—	—

Source: FIFA
(H) Hosts
10 May 2004

Papua New Guinea	1–1	Vanuatu
Wasi 73'	Report	Lauru 90+'

Toleafoa J.S. Blatter Complex, Apia
Attendance: 500
Referee: Matthew Breeze (Australia)
10 May 2004

Samoa	4–0	American Samoa
Bryce 12'; Fasavalu 30', 53'; Michael 66' (pen.)	Report

Toleafoa J.S. Blatter Complex, Apia
Attendance: 500
Referee: Michael Afu (Solomon Islands)

12 May 2004

American Samoa	1–9	Vanuatu
Natia 39'	Report	Qorig 30' (pen.), 45'; Mermer 37', 56', 90+1'; Poida 55'; Chilia 65'; Maleb 80', 90+2'

Toleafoa J.S. Blatter Complex, Apia
Attendance: 400
Referee: Neil Fox (New Zealand)
12 May 2004

Fiji	4–2	Papua New Guinea
Rabo 24'; Toma 45+'; Gataurua 78'; Rokotakala 90'	Report	Davani 12'; Komboi 44'

Toleafoa J.S. Blatter Complex, Apia
Attendance: 400
Referee: Constantinos Diomis (Australia)

15 May 2004

Fiji	11–0	American Samoa
Toma 7', 11', 16'; Vulivuli 24'; Rokotakala 32', 34'; Sabutu 45+', 81'; Masinisau 60'; Gataurua 75', 77'	Report

Toleafoa J.S. Blatter Complex, Apia
Attendance: 300
Referee: Neil Fox (New Zealand)
15 May 2004

Samoa	0–3	Vanuatu
	Report	Mermer 13'; Chilia 55'; Maleb 57'

Toleafoa J.S. Blatter Complex, Apia
Attendance: 650
Referee: Matthew Breeze (Australia)

17 May 2004

American Samoa	0–10	Papua New Guinea
	Report	Davani 23', 24', 40', 79'; A. Lepani 26', 28', 64'; Wasi 34'; Komboi 37'; Lohai 71'

Toleafoa J.S. Blatter Complex, Apia
Attendance: 150
Referee: Michael Afu (Solomon Islands)
17 May 2004

Samoa	0–4	Fiji
	Report	Toma 17'; Sabutu 52'; Masinisau 82'; Rokotakala 84'

Toleafoa J.S. Blatter Complex, Apia
Attendance: 450
Referee: Constantinos Diomis (Australia)

19 May 2004

Fiji	0–3	Vanuatu
	Report	Thomsen 45+'; Lauru 63', 65'

Toleafoa J.S. Blatter Complex, Apia
Attendance: 200
Referee: Matthew Breeze (Australia)
19 May 2004

Samoa	1–4	Papua New Guinea
Michael 69'	Report	Davani 16'; A. Lepani 37'; N. Lepani 55'; Komeng 68'

Toleafoa J.S. Blatter Complex, Apia
Attendance: 300
Referee: Constantinos Diomis (Australia)

== Goalscorers ==
There were 96 goals scored in 20 matches, for an average of 4.8 goals per match.

6 goals

- (New Caledonia) Michel Hmae
- (Papua New Guinea) Reginald Davani

5 goals

- (Fiji) Veresa Toma

4 goals

- (Fiji) Seveci Rokotakala
- (Papua New Guinea) Andrew Lepani
- (Vanuatu) Etienne Mermer

3 goals

- (Fiji) Laisiasa Gataurua
- (Fiji) Waisake Sabutu
- (New Caledonia) Paul Poatinda
- (New Caledonia) Pierre Wajoka
- (Solomon Islands) Henry Fa'arodo
- (Solomon Islands) Alick Maemae
- (Vanuatu) Wilkins Lauru
- (Vanuatu) Jean Maleb

2 goals

- (Fiji) Esala Masi
- (New Caledonia) José Hmae
- (Papua New Guinea) Paul Komboi
- (Papua New Guinea) Mauri Wasi
- (Samoa) Tama Fasavalu
- (Samoa) Junior Michael
- (Solomon Islands) Gideon Omokirio
- (Solomon Islands) Jack Samani
- (French Polynesia) Axel Temataua
- (Vanuatu) Seimata Chilia
- (Vanuatu) Alphose Qorig

1 goal

- (American Samoa) Natia Natia
- (Cook Islands) John Pareanga
- (Fiji) Pita Rabo
- (Fiji) Thomas Vulivuli
- (New Caledonia) Ramon Djamali
- (New Caledonia) Robert Kaumé
- (Papua New Guinea) Eric Komeng
- (Papua New Guinea) Nathaniel Lepani
- (Papua New Guinea) Michael Lohai
- (Samoa) Dennis Bryce
- (Solomon Islands) Leo Leslie
- (Solomon Islands) Batram Suri
- (Solomon Islands) George Suri
- (Solomon Islands) Stanley Waita
- (French Polynesia) Rino Moretta
- (French Polynesia) Vincent Simon
- (French Polynesia) Gabriel Wajoka
- (Tonga) Mark Uhatahi
- (Tonga) Viliami Vaitaki
- (Vanuatu) Moise Poida
- (Vanuatu) Lorry Thomsen
