= 2006 FIFA World Cup qualification (OFC) =

Tournament details
- Dates: 10 May 2004 – 16 November 2005
- Teams: 12 (from 1 confederation)

Tournament statistics
- Matches played: 39
- Goals scored: 175 (4.49 per match)
- Attendance: 227,596 (5,836 per match)
- Top scorer(s): (Australia) Tim Cahill (Fiji) Veresa Toma (7 goals each)

Listed below are the dates and results for the 2006 FIFA World Cup qualification rounds for Oceania. 12 teams took part, competing for a place in the intercontinental play-off against the fifth-placed team from South America. The winner of this play-off qualified for the World Cup.

This qualifying tournament also doubled as the 2004 OFC Nations Cup, up to the final play-off stage.

== First round ==
The competition was composed of three rounds. Australia and New Zealand entered the competition directly in the Second Round. The other 10 teams were divided in two groups of five teams each, and played against each other once. The two teams with most points in each group advanced to the Second Round.

=== Group 1 ===
Pos	Team	Pld	W	D	L	GF	GA	GD	Pts	Qualification	Solomon Islands national football team	Tahiti national football team	New Caledonia national football team	Tonga national football team	Cook Islands national football team
1	Solomon Islands (H)	4	3	1	0	14	1	+13	10	Advance to 2004 OFC Nations Cup	—	1–1	2–0	6–0	5–0
2	Tahiti	4	2	2	0	5	1	+4	8	Advance to 2004 OFC Nations Cup	—	—	0–0	2–0	2–0
3	New Caledonia	4	2	1	1	16	2	+14	7		—	—	—	8–0	8–0
4	Tonga	4	1	0	3	2	17	−15	3		—	—	—	—	2–1
5	Cook Islands	4	0	0	4	1	17	−16	0		—	—	—	—	—

Source: FIFA
(H) Hosts

=== Group 2 ===
Pos	Team	Pld	W	D	L	GF	GA	GD	Pts	Qualification	Vanuatu national football team	Fiji national football team	Papua New Guinea national soccer team	Samoa national football team	American Samoa national football team
1	Vanuatu	4	3	1	0	16	2	+14	10	Advance to 2004 OFC Nations Cup	—	—	—	—	—
2	Fiji	4	3	0	1	19	5	+14	9	Advance to 2004 OFC Nations Cup	0–3	—	4–2	—	11–0
3	Papua New Guinea	4	2	1	1	17	6	+11	7		1–1	—	—	—	—
4	Samoa (H)	4	1	0	3	5	11	−6	3		0–3	0–4	1–4	—	4–0
5	American Samoa	4	0	0	4	1	34	−33	0		1–9	—	0–10	—	—

Source: FIFA
(H) Hosts

== Second round ==
In the Second round, the six teams were put in a single group, and played against each other once. The two teams with most points advanced to a play-off, and played against each other home and away. The winner of this play-off advanced to the intercontinental play-off.

=== Group stage ===
Pos	Team	Pld	W	D	L	GF	GA	GD	Pts	Qualification	Australia men's national soccer team	Solomon Islands national football team	New Zealand men's national football team	Fiji national football team	Tahiti national football team	Vanuatu national football team
1	Australia	5	4	1	0	21	3	+18	13	Advance to final	—	—	1–0	6–1	9–0	—
2	Solomon Islands	5	3	1	1	9	6	+3	10	Advance to final	2–2	—	—	—	—	—
3	New Zealand	5	3	0	2	17	5	+12	9		—	3–0	—	—	10–0	—
4	Fiji	5	1	1	3	3	10	−7	4		—	1–2	0–2	—	—	1–0
5	Tahiti	5	1	1	3	2	24	−22	4		—	0–4	—	0–0	—	2–1
6	Vanuatu	5	1	0	4	5	9	−4	3		0–3	0–1	4–2	—	—	—

Rules for classification: Tiebreakers

=== Final ===
Team 1	Agg.	Team 2	1st leg	2nd leg
Solomon Islands	1–11	Australia	1–5	0–6

Australia and the Solomon Islands progressed to the final stage.

== Final round ==
Team 1	Agg.	Team 2	1st leg	2nd leg
Australia	9–1	Solomon Islands	7–0	2–1

3 September 2005
19:30

Australia	7–0	Solomon Islands
Culina 20'; Viduka 36', 43'; Cahill 57'; Chipperfield 64'; Thompson 68'; Emerton 89'	Report

Sydney Football Stadium, Sydney
Attendance: 16,000
Referee: Subkhiddin Mohd Salleh (Malaysia)

6 September 2005
13:00

Solomon Islands	1–2	Australia
Fa'arodo 49' (pen.)	Report	Thompson 19'; Emerton 58'

Lawson Tama, Honiara
Attendance: 16,000
Referee: Shamsul Maidin (Singapore)

Australia won 9–1 on aggregate and advanced to the CONMEBOL–OFC play-off against Uruguay.

== Inter-confederation play-offs ==
The final round winners then played the fifth-placed team of CONMEBOL qualifying, Uruguay, in a home-and-away play-off. The winner of this play-off qualified for the 2006 FIFA World Cup finals.

Team 1	Agg.	Team 2	1st leg	2nd leg
Uruguay	1–1 (2–4 p)	Australia	1–0	0–1 (a.e.t.)

== Qualified teams ==
The following team from OFC qualified for the final tournament.

Team	Qualified as	Qualified on	Previous appearances in FIFA World Cup^{1}
Australia	CONMEBOL-OFC play-off winners	16 November 2005	1 (1974)

^{1} Bold indicates champions for that year. Italic indicates hosts for that year.

== Top goalscorers ==
There were 175 goals scored in 39 matches, for an average of 4.49 goals per match.

7 goals

- (Australia) Tim Cahill
- (Fiji) Veresa Toma

6 goals

- (Australia) Brett Emerton
- (New Caledonia) Michel Hmae
- (New Zealand) Vaughan Coveny
- (Papua New Guinea) Reginald Davani

5 goals

- (Solomon Islands) Henry Fa'arodo

4 goals

- (Fiji) Laisiasa Gataurua
- (Fiji) Seveci Rokotakala
- (New Zealand) Brent Fisher
- (Papua New Guinea) Andrew Lepani
- (Solomon Islands) Commins Menapi
- (Solomon Islands) Batram Suri
- (Vanuatu) Jean Maleb
- (Vanuatu) Etienne Mermer

Below are full goalscorer lists for each round:

- First round
- Second round
- Final round
