= George Suri =

Solomon Islands footballer

Personal information
- Full name: George Suri
- Date of birth: 16 July 1982 (age 44)
- Place of birth: Honiara, Solomon Islands
- Height: 1.86 m (6 ft 1 in)
- Position: Defender

Senior career*
Years	Team	Apps	(Gls)
2004–2005	East Coast Bays AFC		
2006–2007	Waitakere United	15	(1)
2007–2009	Auckland City FC	11	(2)
2009–2013	Koloale		
2013–	Kossa		(7)

International career^{‡}
2002–2011	Solomon Islands	23	(1)
Medal record
Men's football
Representing Solomon Islands
OFC Nations Cup
Runner-up	2004 Australia
Pacific Games
Silver medal – second place	2011 New Caledonia
- * Club domestic league appearances and goals as of 15 October 2022 ‡ National team caps and goals as of 31 January 2013

George Suri (born 16 July 1982 in Honiara) is a Solomon Islands soccer defender, currently playing for NZFC (New Zealand Football Championship) side Auckland City FC.

== Club career ==
Nicknamed Jungle, he has previously played for East Coast Bays and Waitakere United in New Zealand.

== International career ==
Suri made his debut for the Solomon Islands national football team in 2002 against New Zealand and has collected 19 caps, scoring 1 goal.

== Career statistics ==
=== International ===
Appearances and goals by national team and year
National team	Year	Apps	Goals
Solomon Islands	2002	1	0
Solomon Islands	2003	–	
Solomon Islands	2004	10	1
Solomon Islands	2005	2	0
Solomon Islands	2006	–	
Solomon Islands	2007	6	0
Solomon Islands	2008	–	
Solomon Islands	2009	–	
Solomon Islands	2010	–	
Solomon Islands	2011	4	0
Total		23	1

Scores and results list the Solomon Islands' goal tally first, score column indicates score after each Suri goal.

List of international goals scored by George Suri
No.	Date	Venue	Opponent	Score	Result	Competition
1	15 May 2004	Lawson Tama Stadium, Honiara, Solomon Islands	New Caledonia	2–0	2–0	2006 FIFA World Cup qualification

== Honours ==
Solomon Islands

- OFC Nations Cup: Runner-up, 2004
- Pacific Games: Silver Medalist, 2011
