= Axel Temataua =

Tahitian footballer (born 1980)

Personal information
- Date of birth: 29 August 1980 (age 46)
- Place of birth: Tahiti
- Position: Striker

Team information
- Current team: AS Manu-Ura
- Number: 16

Senior career*
Years	Team	Apps	(Gls)
2003–	AS Manu-Ura		

International career^{‡}
2004	Tahiti	9	(3)
- * Club domestic league appearances and goals as of 17:13, 17 October 2018 (UTC) ‡ National team caps and goals as of 17:13, 17 October 2018 (UTC)

Axel Temataua (born 29 August 1980) is a Tahitian footballer who plays for AS Manu-Ura, as a striker.

== Club career ==
Temataua began his career with AS Manu-Ura, joining the club in 2003.

== International career ==
On 10 May 2004, Temataua made his debut for Tahiti in a 2–0 win against the Cook Islands, scoring two minutes into the game.

=== International goals ===
Scores and results list Tahiti's goal tally first.

#	Date	Venue	Opponent	Score	Result	Competition
1	10 May 2004	Lawson Tama Stadium, Honiara, Solomon Islands	Cook Islands	1–0	2–0	2006 FIFA World Cup qualification
2	17 May 2004	Lawson Tama Stadium, Honiara, Solomon Islands	Tonga	2–0	2–0	2006 FIFA World Cup qualification
3	6 June 2004	Marden Sports Complex, Adelaide, Australia	Vanuatu	1–1	2–1	2004 OFC Nations Cup
