= Adrian Madaschi =

Australian soccer player

Personal information
- Full name: Adrian Antony Madaschi
- Date of birth: 11 July 1982 (age 44)
- Place of birth: Perth, Western Australia
- Height: 1.90 m (6 ft 3 in)
- Positions: Centre-back; left-back

Team information
- Current team: Floreat Athena
- Number: 4

Youth career
- Perth SC
- 1998–2000: Atalanta

Senior career*
| Years | Team | Apps | (Gls) |
| 2000–2003 | Atalanta | 6 | (2) |
| 2001 | → Monza (loan) | 8 | (0) |
| 2002 | → Pistoiese (loan) | 2 | (0) |
| 2003–2005 | Partick Thistle | 51 | (4) |
| 2005 | Dundee | 13 | (0) |
| 2005–2006 | Grosseto | 2 | (0) |
| 2006–2011 | Portosummaga | 156 | (2) |
| 2011–2012 | Melbourne Heart | 9 | (0) |
| 2012–2013 | Jeju United | 35 | (0) |
| 2014 | Perth SC | 2 | (0) |
| 2014–2015 | Newcastle Jets | 10 | (0) |
| 2015 | Western Sydney Wanderers | 0 | (0) |
| 2016–2018 | Perth SC | 55 | (2) |
| 2019– | Floreat Athena | 16 | (0) |

International career^{‡}
| 1999 | Australia U17 | 9 | (0) |
| 2000–2001 | Australia U20 | 7 | (1) |
| 2004 | Australia U23 | 6 | (0) |
| 2004–2009 | Australia | 5 | (2) |
Medal record
Men's football
Representing Australia
FIFA U-17 World Championship
| Runner-up | 1999 New Zealand |
OFC Nations Cup
| Winner | 2004 Australia |
OFC U-19 Men's Championship
| Winner | 2001 Cook Islands/New Caledonia |
- * Club domestic league appearances and goals as of 24 April 2020 ‡ National team caps and goals as of 2 September 2015

Adrian Anthony Madaschi (born 11 July 1982) is an Australian soccer player who last played for Perth SC. He is a left-footed defender whose position is centre-back and can also play full-back.

== Club career ==
Madaschi was born in Perth, Western Australia. He left Perth Italia to join Italian Serie A side Atalanta's youth team at the age of 15 in 1998. Madaschi was part of the Atalanta youth side that won back to back Primavera Coppa Italia (Italian Youth Cups) in 1999–00 and 2000–01, along with losing the Italian Scudetto (Youth Championship final) to Inter in 2000–01. He was loaned out to Monza in July 2001, but in the January 2002 window was re-called back to Atalanta to the first team squad.

Adrian constantly made first team squads at Atalanta, but could never break into the then Serie A team. He was again loaned out by Atalanta to Pistoiese for the 2002–03 season. But again, did not see much first team action.

In October 2003, after mutually agreeing to terminate his contract with Atalanta B.C a year in advance, Adrian signed for Partick Thistle in the Scottish Premier League. Unfortunately, even prior to Madaschi's arrival, Partick were doomed for relegation that season to the Scottish First Division. Madaschi though, got regular First Team Football, playing 24 matches and scoring 2 goals in his debut Scottish season in the SPL and 27 appearances and 2 goals in the following season in the First Division. Madaschi left the club in May 2005, to join Dundee for the 2005–06 First Division season. Adrian had to leave the club at the start of December 2005 to cure a recurring osteitis pubis injury back in Australia.

Madaschi returned to Italy to join Grosseto in January 2006 and remained at the club until the end of that season. He then joined Portosummaga in the 2006–07 season. In the 2007–08 season, Madaschi and Portosummaga achieved promotion to Lega Pro Divisione 1 where the club has maintained its status.

The end of the 2009–10 season saw Portogruaro-Summaga finish champions of the Lega Pro division 1, beating Hellas Verona in the final game of the season 1–0 to guarantee automatic Promotion to Serie B. Madaschi was named in the Lega Pro, team of the year as a centre Bback.

Portogruaro-Summaga struggled during the 2010–11 season in Serie B and was relegated back to Lega Pro, Following their relegation Madaschi travelled back to Melbourne, Australia and played for Melbourne Heart in a largely successful 10 game injury replacement before heading to Asia.

On 16 January 2012, Madaschi joined South Korean outfit Jeju United. At the end of the 2013–14 season Adrian returned home to Perth. Citing a lack of interest from the A-League, he signed for local club Perth SC where he went on to make just three appearances before being snapped up by Newcastle Jets on 6 June 2014. He was reportedly sacked from the club by owner Nathan Tinkler, following a player revolt midway through the 2014–15 A-League season.

On 20 March 2015, he signed for Western Sydney Wanderers as an injury replacement for Nick Ward.

== International career ==
Madaschi was centre back for the Joeys at the 1999 FIFA U-17 World Cup in New Zealand where Australia lost on penalties to Brazil in the final, to finish runner up for the tournament. Madaschi was elected in the FIFA Top 11 team of the Tournament.

He also started all four games in defence for the Young Socceroos played at the 2001 FIFA U-20 World Cup in Argentina.

In 2004, Adrian was in the centre of defence for the 'Olyroos' (The Australian Olympic Football Team) at Athens.

Earlier that year in May and June 2004, Adrian Madaschi was capped four times for the Socceroos during the Second Stage of Qualifiers for the 2006 World Cup. He scored two goals, as part of a 6–1 victory over Fiji, in his second match for Australia.

In May 2009, Madaschi was named in a 30-man Socceroos squad for the team's last three 2010 World Cup qualifiers.

On 12 August 2009, Madaschi earned another full international cap, playing the second half in the Socceroos 3–0 victory over the Republic of Ireland in Limerick.

== Honours ==
Australia

- OFC Nations Cup: 2004

Australia U-20

- OFC U-19 Men's Championship: 2001

Australia U17

- FIFA U-17 World Cup: runner-up 1999
