= Oceania Footballer of the Year =

- Presented by: Oceania Football Confederation
- First award: 1988
- Final award: 2015

Highlights
- Most awards: (New Zealand) Wynton Rufer (Australia) Harry Kewell (3 awards)

The Oceania Footballer of the Year award was presented each year to the best football (soccer) player from the Oceania region, as chosen by a panel of football journalists. The award was dominated by Australian players until that nation became part of the Asian Football Confederation. After this, it was similarly dominated by New Zealand players. New Zealand's Wynton Rufer is tied with Harry Kewell for the most titles with three awards each, whilst New Caledonia's Christian Karembeu, New Zealand's Shane Smeltz and Ryan Nelsen and Australia's Robbie Slater have each won the award twice.

== Winners ==
Year	Player	Team
1988	(Australia) Frank Farina	(Belgium) Club Brugge
1989	(New Zealand) Wynton Rufer	(Switzerland) Grasshopper
1990	(New Zealand) Wynton Rufer	(Germany) Werder Bremen
1991	(Australia) Robbie Slater	(France) Lens
1992	(New Zealand) Wynton Rufer	(Germany) Werder Bremen
1993	(Australia) Robbie Slater	(France) Lens
1994	(Australia) Aurelio Vidmar	(Belgium) Standard Liège
1995	(New Caledonia) Christian Karembeu	(Italy) Sampdoria
1996	(Australia) Paul Okon	(Italy) Lazio
1997	(Australia) Mark Bosnich	(England) Aston Villa
1998	(New Caledonia) Christian Karembeu	(Spain) Real Madrid
1999	(Australia) Harry Kewell	(England) Leeds United
2000	(Australia) Mark Viduka	(England) Leeds United
2001	(Australia) Harry Kewell	(England) Leeds United
2002	(Australia) Brett Emerton	(Netherlands) Feyenoord
2003	(Australia) Harry Kewell	(England) Liverpool
2004	(Australia) Tim Cahill	(England) Everton
2005	(French Polynesia) Marama Vahirua	(France) Nice
2006	(New Zealand) Ryan Nelsen	(England) Blackburn Rovers
2007	(New Zealand) Shane Smeltz	(New Zealand) Wellington Phoenix
2008	(New Zealand) Shane Smeltz	(New Zealand) Wellington Phoenix
2009	(New Zealand) Ivan Vicelich	(New Zealand) Auckland City
2010	(New Zealand) Ryan Nelsen	(England) Blackburn Rovers
2011	(New Caledonia) Bertrand Kaï	(New Caledonia) Hienghène Sport
2012	(New Zealand) Marco Rojas	(Australia) Melbourne Victory
2013	(Australia) Trent Sainsbury	(Australia) Central Coast Mariners FC
2015	(New Zealand) Ryan Thomas	(Netherlands) PEC Zwolle

== Winners by country ==
Tally	Country
13	Australia
10	New Zealand
3	New Caledonia
1	(French Polynesia) Tahiti

== Other Oceania Awards ==
Wynton Rufer was voted as the Oceania Footballer of the Century.

Mark Bosnich was voted Oceania Goalkeeper of the Century.
