= Veresa Toma =

Fijian footballer

Personal information
- Full name: Ratu Veresa Toma
- Date of birth: 26 August 1981 (age 45)
- Place of birth: Fiji
- Position: Midfielder

Senior career*
Years	Team	Apps	(Gls)
2000–2001	Nadroga		
2002	Gombak United	0	(0)
2003	Olympian Team		
2004	Bentleigh Greens		
2004–2006	Nadi	23	(2)
2007–2008	Oakleigh Cannons		
2008–2009	Hekari United		
2009	Navua		
2010–2012	Rewa		

International career^{‡}
2002–2011	Fiji	15	(10)
Medal record
Men's football
Representing Fiji
Pacific Games
Gold medal – first place	2003 Fiji
- * Club domestic league appearances and goals as of 15 June 2018 ‡ National team caps and goals as of 1 August 2014

Veresa Toma (born 26 August 1981) is a retired Fijian footballer who played as a midfielder. He played in Singapore, Australia and Papua New Guinea.

He has represented the Fiji national football team and led the all goalscorers with 7 goals at the 2004 OFC Nations Cup.

== Private life ==
Veresa is the brother of Viliame Dawai and the uncle of Fijian U20 captain and Nadi rep. Mataiasi Toma

== Career statistics ==
=== International ===
Appearances and goals by national team and year
National team	Year	Apps	Goals
Fiji	2002	3	1
Fiji	2003	5	2
Fiji	2004	6	7
Fiji	2011	1	0
Total		15	10

Scores and results list Fiji's goal tally first, score column indicates score after each Toma goal.

List of international goals scored by Veresa Toma
No.	Date	Venue	Opponent	Score	Result	Competition	Ref.
1	6 July 2002	Mount Smart Stadium, Auckland, New Zealand	New Caledonia	1–0	2–1	2002 OFC Nations Cup	
2	7 July 2003	Churchill Park, Lautoka, Fiji	Solomon Islands	1–0	2–1	2003 South Pacific Games	
3	9 July 2003	Churchill Park, Lautoka, Fiji	Tahiti	2–1	2–1	2003 South Pacific Games	
4	12 May 2004	National Soccer Stadium, Apia, Samoa	Papua New Guinea	2–2	4–2	2006 FIFA World Cup qualification	
5	15 May 2004	National Soccer Stadium, Apia, Samoa	American Samoa	1–0	11–0	2006 FIFA World Cup qualification	
6	15 May 2004	National Soccer Stadium, Apia, Samoa	American Samoa	2–0	11–0	2006 FIFA World Cup qualification	
7	15 May 2004	National Soccer Stadium, Apia, Samoa	American Samoa	3–0	11–0	2006 FIFA World Cup qualification	
8	17 May 2004	National Soccer Stadium, Apia, Samoa	Samoa	1–0	4–0	2006 FIFA World Cup qualification	
9	31 May 2004	Hindmarsh Stadium, Adelaide, Australia	Vanuatu	1–0	1–0	2004 OFC Nations Cup	
10	4 June 2004	Hindmarsh Stadium, Adelaide, Australia	Solomon Islands	1–1	1–2	2004 OFC Nations Cup	

== Honours ==
Fiji

- Pacific Games: Gold Medalist, 2003
