= Brett Emerton =

Australian soccer player (born 1979)

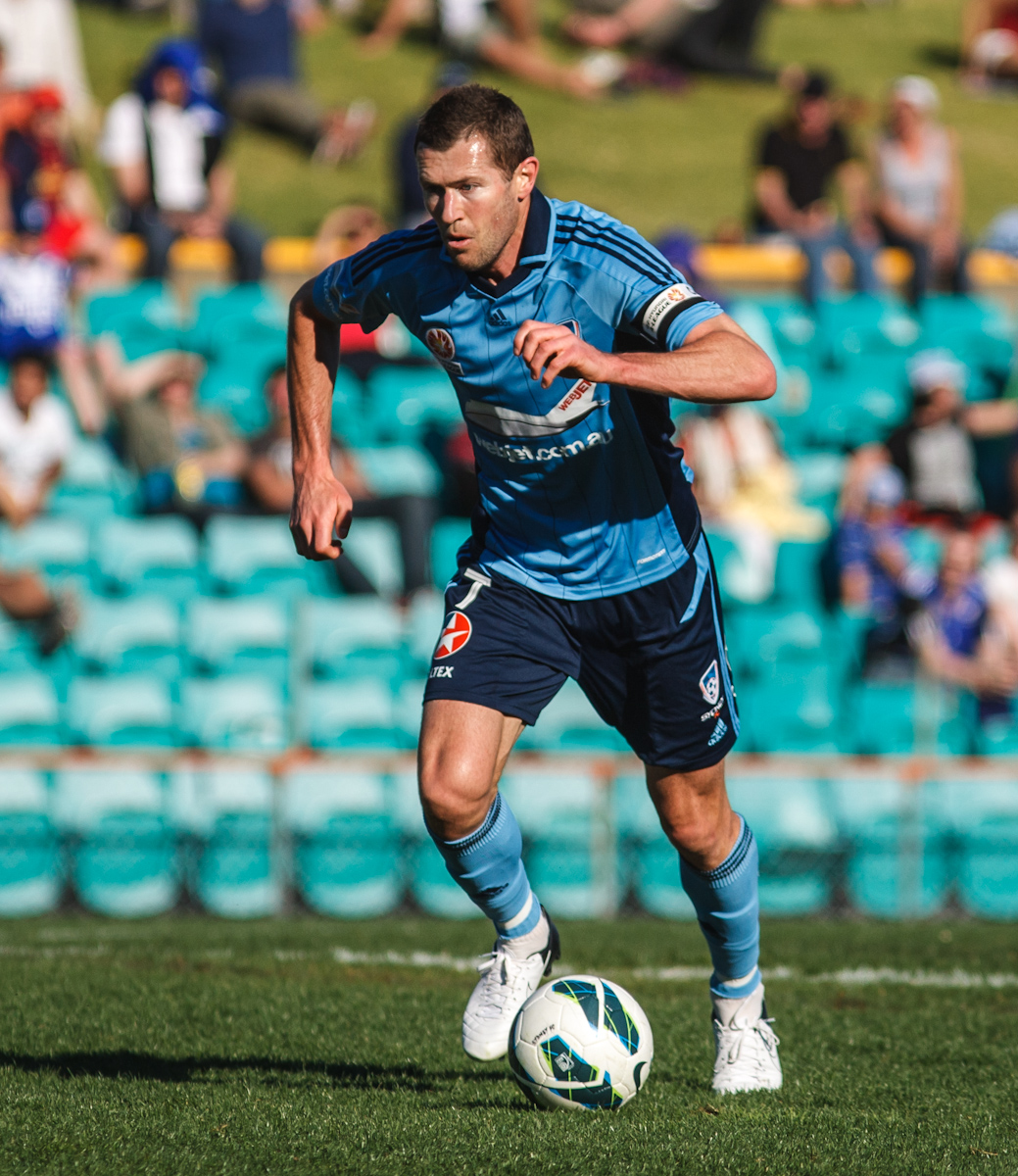
- Emerton with Sydney FC in 2012

Personal information
- Full name: Brett Michael Emerton
- Date of birth: 22 February 1979 (age 47)
- Place of birth: Bankstown, Sydney, Australia
- Height: 1.85 m (6 ft 1 in)
- Positions: Right midfielder; right back

Youth career
- Gunners Soccer Club
- Macarthur Rams
- Marconi Stallions
- 1996: NSWIS
- 1996–1997: AIS

Senior career*
Years	Team	Apps	(Gls)
1996–2000	Sydney Olympic	94	(16)
2000–2003	Feyenoord	92	(11)
2003–2011	Blackburn Rovers	247	(13)
2011–2014	Sydney FC	57	(7)
Total		390	(47)

International career
1994–1995	Australia U17	11	(1)
1996–1999	Australia U20	16	(1)
1997–2000	Australia U23	25	(7)
1998–2012	Australia	95	(20)
Medal record
Men's football
Representing Australia
AFC Asian Cup
Runner-up	2011 Qatar
OFC Nations Cup
Winner	2000 Tahiti
Winner	2004 Australia
FIFA Confederations Cup
Third place	2001 South Korea-Japan
OFC U-20 Championship
Winner	Tahiti 1997
OFC U-16/U-17 Championship
Winner	1995
- * Club domestic league appearances and goals

Brett Michael Emerton (born 22 February 1979) is an Australian former professional soccer player who played for Sydney Olympic, Sydney FC, Feyenoord Rotterdam, Blackburn Rovers and the Australia national team.

== Club career ==
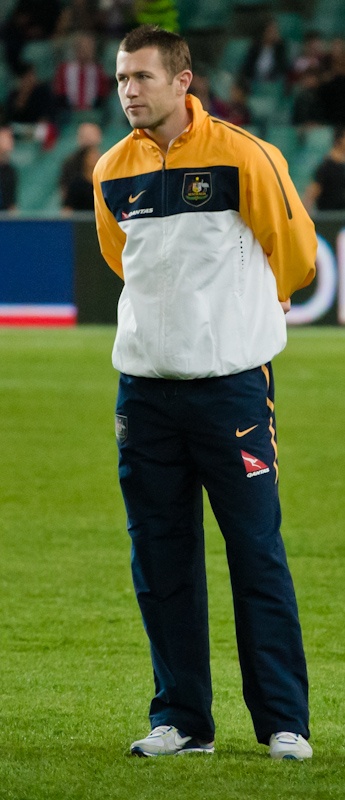
Emerton at the Sydney Football Stadium in October 2010

=== Early career ===
Growing up in Macquarie Fields, Emerton first played for Gunners Soccer Club at Bensley Road as a five-year-old. He was nicknamed "the greyhound". During the following years he played for the Macarthur Rams.

=== Sydney Olympic ===
Emerton was a product of the Australian Institute of Sport and started his career with Sydney Olympic in the National Soccer League in August 1996. During his stay at the club he impressed widely with his pace and stamina, as much as his play with the ball. After making 94 appearances and scoring 16 goals. Emerton began to be noticed in Europe.

=== Feyenoord ===
After captaining the Olyroos at the Sydney Olympics, Emerton joined Feyenoord in August 2000 for a fee of £415,000. He won a UEFA Cup winners medal in May 2002 (although Emerton himself was banned for the final) and being named the 2002 Oceania Footballer of the Year. He made a total of 111 league and cup appearances for Feyenoord, scoring eleven goals.

=== Blackburn Rovers ===
After being linked with several Premiership teams, Emerton eventually joined Blackburn Rovers in July 2003 for an undisclosed fee, on a four-year contract, saying, "I've always dreamed of playing in the Premiership so to finally achieve it is great." He turned down offers from other clubs so that he could play in his preferred position on the wing. He scored on his debut in a 5–1 win over Wolverhampton Wanderers in August 2003. Manager Graeme Souness said of him: "Emerton is a top player. If he can keep up that level of trickery I will be quite happy." In his first Premier League season, Emerton played in 37 league games, scored two goals, and featured in 40 matches in all competitions. However, Blackburn failed to make progress in the UEFA Cup and struggled against relegation.

Blackburn survived that season but again struggled in the 2004–05 season, not winning a game until September 2004. However, the club preserved their Premiership status following a change of manager and reached the FA Cup semi-finals, where they lost to Arsenal. Emerton paid credit to new manager, Mark Hughes, "It is a huge achievement. When Mark came in we were in a bit of disarray but from the day he arrived we worked on our fitness. Everyone is better for that and it has shown in our performances."

A more successful season in 2005–06 saw Blackburn reach the 5th round of the FA Cup, losing to West Ham United, the semi-finals of the League Cup and qualifying for the UEFA Cup. Following the end of the season, Emerton signed a new four-year deal at Blackburn in August 2006. Mark Hughes described him as "a player who gives me a lot of options. He can carry the ball from one end of the field to the other. That's why teams have coveted him this summer." Emerton made 47 appearances in the 2006–07 season as Blackburn finished in mid-table but reached the FA Cup semi-final for the second time in three years, losing to Chelsea, and reached the knock-out stages of the UEFA cup, eventually losing out to Bayer Leverkusen for a place in the last 16. At the end of the 2006–07 season, Emerton had made a total of 167 appearances for Blackburn in all competitions, scoring ten goals.

In July 2008, Emerton signed a new four-year contract, keeping him at the club until the summer of 2012.

On 31 January 2009, Emerton's 2008–09 season came to a halt versus Middlesbrough when during a tackle, he damaged his knee. It was revealed on 2 February that he had damaged his cruciate ligament, which meant he would miss the remainder of the season, 6 to 9 months being his expected recovery time.

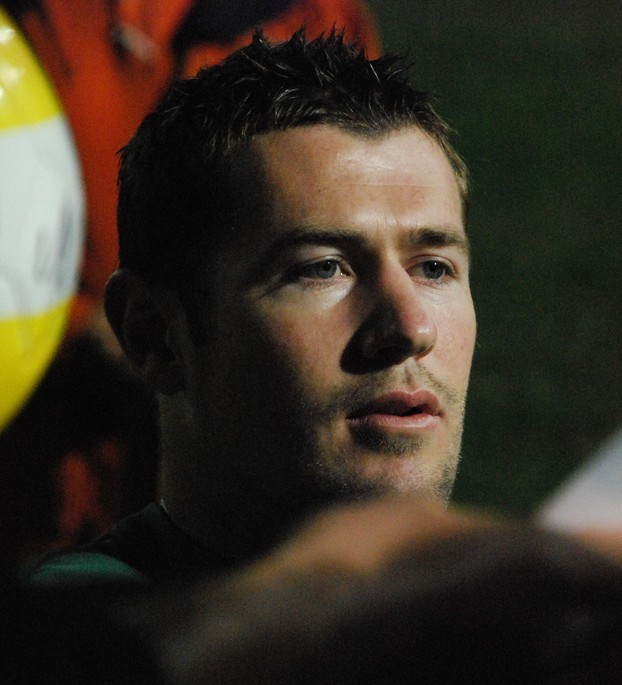
Brett Emerton at Blackburn Rovers

On 12 September 2009, Emerton made his long-awaited return to Premier League football as a second-half substitute in the 3–1 Blackburn victory over fellow Premier League side Wolverhampton Wanderers. On 4 October 2009, Emerton started his first match in 2009–10 since being injured at Middlesbrough the previous season, playing against Arsenal at the Emirates Stadium in a heavy 6–2 defeat with Emerton playing 57 minutes before being replaced by substitute Morten Gamst Pedersen. In all competitions during the 2009–10 season, Emerton made a total of 29 appearances, scoring two goals, and providing four assists.

On 25 July 2010, he replaced Morten Gamst Pedersen in the 60th minute in the 2–1 defeat to Rangers in the Sydney Festival of Football tournament held in Australia, but could not prevent the team from losing. "The biggest cheer of the afternoon came on the hour mark with the introduction of Brett Emerton, the Australian crowd all standing to applaud the introduction of the Sydney-born midfielder. Emerton scored his first goal of the 2010–11 Premier League season in a 2–1 victory over Blackpool at Bloomfield Road on 25 September, in which he scored in the 92nd minute of injury time. On 4 December, he scored his second goal of the season at Ewood Park against Wolverhampton Wanderers in the 43rd minute, playing the full 90 minutes in a 3–0 victory. Emerton scored the opening goal, and his third goal for the 2010–11 season, against local rivals Manchester United. In Rovers' last Premier League match of the season against Wolves at Molineux, Emerton scored a volley on 38 minutes and also played the full 90 minutes in a 3–2 win. He was made captain for his final match for Blackburn against Everton at Ewood Park on 27 August 2011, playing the full 90 minutes.

=== Sydney FC ===
On 25 August 2011, it was announced that Emerton had signed with two time A-League champions, Sydney FC on a three-year deal after terminating his contract with Blackburn Rovers by mutual consent returning him to his homeland after 11 years abroad. He was the Vice-Captain of Sydney FC. He made his début at Etihad Stadium against A-League giants Melbourne Victory, where he had a 33rd-minute penalty saved by Ante Covic and came off in the 84th minute in front of 40,000 people in attendance in the 0–0 draw. He scored his first goal in the round 7 game against the Central Coast Mariners from a free kick, but Sydney slumped to a 3–2 defeat.

On 23 March 2013, Emerton was shown a red card against Western Sydney Wanderers for a studs-up challenge on left-back and former teammate Shannon Cole. He received a straight red card even though he received a yellow card three minutes before.

On 20 July 2013, Emerton captained the A-League All Stars in the inaugural A-League All Stars Game against Manchester United, a match in which the A-League All Stars were thrashed 5–1, courtesy of goals from Danny Welbeck, Jesse Lingard and Robin van Persie. Emerton was substituted off in the 83rd minute of the match, and was replaced by Adelaide United midfielder Marcelo Carrusca.

On 16 January 2014, Emerton announced his retirement from professional football as a result of his persistent back problems.

== International career ==
Emerton was captain of the "Olyroos", Australia's Olympic soccer team, at the 2000 Summer Olympics in Sydney, where he was sent off against Nigeria as Australia were beaten 3–2 and went out of the tournament. He was named in the Australia squad for the 2001 FIFA Confederations Cup held in South Korea and Japan and made the starting line-up in a shock win over France and a defeat by South Korea as Australia qualified from the Group stages.

Emerton was a member of the Australian national team that lost out on the final place in the 2002 World Cup finals in Korea and Japan when Uruguay beat Australia over two legs in November 2001. He played in the team that comprehensively beat England 3–1 at the Boleyn Ground in February 2003, scoring the final goal to seal an impressive win.

Emerton played in both legs of World Cup play-off against Uruguay in November 2005, when the Socceroos qualified for the 2006 FIFA World Cup in Germany, the first time that Australia had reached the finals of the World Cup since 1974, and was named in the Australian squad for the World Cup finals. He was in the starting line-up for all three Group Stage games against Japan, Brazil and Croatia as Australia qualified for the second round. However, he received two yellow cards against Croatia, was sent off in the 87th minute and subsequently missed the Socceroos' second round match against Italy.

Emerton scored two goals against Qatar in Australia's fourth match of World Cup Qualification for the 2010 FIFA World Cup, in Doha. The match finished 3–1 to the Australians, as the nation advanced to the second round of the World Cup qualifiers. He also scored two goals against Qatar on 15 October in Brisbane, one from the penalty spot and the other a right foot finish from a flowing Australian move. Since returning from injury Emerton has received an international recall for the upcoming matches against the Netherlands and Oman. In his return match for the Socceroos against the Netherlands, Emerton came on as a second-half substitute for Josh Kennedy, and made an exceptional return by looking dangerous on the right side of midfield. He then started the next match on against Oman and played a full 90 minutes. Emerton scored a late winner against Oman in the 2011 Asian Cup Qualifying fixture to give the Socceroos a 2–1 win. On 17 November 2010, he injured his hamstring whilst on international duty against Egypt in a 3–0 defeat in Cairo. On 25 January 2011, Emerton scored his 18th goal for his country and the fourth goal in the 73rd minute of the match when he scored against Uzbekistan in a 6–0 win in the semi-finals of the 2011 AFC Asian Cup after coming on from the bench. He played a total of 5 games at the tournament. On 5 June 2011, he captained Australia in the absence of Lucas Neill in a 3–0 victory over New Zealand at the Adelaide Oval. On 7 June 2011, Emerton started the friendly game against Serbia playing in the 0–0 draw. Emerton started and scored the winner in a 1–0 victory for the Socceroos against Hong Kong in East Asian Cup qualification.

== Style of play ==
Able to play as a wide midfielder or defender, Emerton was known for his "speed, ball control and creativity."

== Career statistics ==
=== Club ===
Appearances and goals by club, season and competition
Club	Season	League			Cup (Note: Appearances in KNVB Cup, FA Cup, Football League Cup, FA Community Shield, FFA Cup)		Continental		Total	
Club	Season	Division	Apps	Goals	Apps	Goals	Apps	Goals	Apps	Goals
Sydney Olympic	1996–97	National Soccer League	18	2	–		–		18	2
Sydney Olympic	1997–98	National Soccer League	24	3	–		–		24	3
Sydney Olympic	1998–99	National Soccer League	21	2	–		–		21	2
Sydney Olympic	1999–2000	National Soccer League	31	9	–		–		31	9
Sydney Olympic	Total		94	16	0	0	0	0	94	16
Feyenoord	2000–01	Eredivisie	28	2	3	1	7	0	35	3
Feyenoord	2001–02	Eredivisie	31	6	2	0	9	0	43	6
Feyenoord	2002–03	Eredivisie	33	3	2	0	6	1	43	4
Feyenoord	Total		92	11	7	1	22	1	121	13
Blackburn Rovers	2003–04	Premier League	37	2	1	0	2	1	40	3
Blackburn Rovers	2004–05	Premier League	37	4	7	1	0	0	44	5
Blackburn Rovers	2005–06	Premier League	30	1	7	1	0	0	37	2
Blackburn Rovers	2006–07	Premier League	34	0	7	0	6	0	47	0
Blackburn Rovers	2007–08	Premier League	33	1	3	0	4	0	40	1
Blackburn Rovers	2008–09	Premier League	20	1	2	1	0	0	22	2
Blackburn Rovers	2009–10	Premier League	24	0	5	2	0	0	29	2
Blackburn Rovers	2010–11	Premier League	30	4	2	0	0	0	32	4
Blackburn Rovers	2011–12	Premier League	2	0	1	0	0	0	3	0
Blackburn Rovers	Total		247	13	35	5	12	1	294	19
Sydney FC	2011–12	A-League	26	4	–		–		26	4
Sydney FC	2012–13	A-League	22	3	–		–		22	3
Sydney FC	2013–14	A-League	9	0	–		–		9	0
Sydney FC	Total		57	7	0	0	0	0	57	7
Career total			490	47	43	5	34	2	567	54

=== International ===
Appearances and goals by national team and year
National team	Year	Apps	Goals
Australia	1998	5	0
Australia	1999	0	0
Australia	2000	10	1
Australia	2001	7	3
Australia	2002	0	0
Australia	2003	2	1
Australia	2004	10	4
Australia	2005	11	2
Australia	2006	9	0
Australia	2007	8	1
Australia	2008	7	4
Australia	2009	3	1
Australia	2010	6	0
Australia	2011	13	1
Australia	2012	4	2
Total		95	20

Scores and results list Australia's goal tally first, score column indicates score after each Emerton goal.

List of international goals scored by Brett Emerton
No.	Date	Venue	Opponent	Score	Result	Competition
1	15 November 2000	Hampden Park, Glasgow, Scotland	Scotland	2–0	2–0	Friendly
2	20 June 2001	Westpac Stadium, Wellington, New Zealand	New Zealand	1–0	2–0	2002 FIFA World Cup qualification
3	20 June 2001	Westpac Stadium, Wellington, New Zealand	New Zealand	2–0	2–0	2002 FIFA World Cup qualification
4	24 June 2001	Sydney Football Stadium, Sydney, Australia	New Zealand	2–0	4–1	2002 FIFA World Cup qualification
5	12 February 2003	Upton Park, London, England	England	3–1	3–1	Friendly
6	4 June 2004	Hindmarsh Stadium, Adelaide, Australia	Vanuatu	2–0	3–0	2004 OFC Nations Cup
7	6 June 2004	Hindmarsh Stadium, Adelaide, Australia	Solomon Islands	2–1	2–2	2004 OFC Nations Cup
8	9 October 2004	Lawson Tama, Honiara, Solomon Islands	Solomon Islands	4–0	5–1	2004 OFC Nations Cup
9	12 October 2004	Sydney Football Stadium, Sydney, Australia	Solomon Islands	6–0	6–0	2004 OFC Nations Cup
10	3 September 2005	Stadium Australia, Sydney, Australia	Solomon Islands	7–0	7–0	2006 FIFA World Cup qualification
11	6 September 2005	Lawson Tama, Honiara, Solomon Islands	Solomon Islands	2–1	2–1	2006 FIFA World Cup qualification
12	7 February 2007	Loftus Road, London, England	Denmark	1–3	1–3	Friendly
13	15 June 2008	Khalifa International Stadium, Al Rayyan, Qatar	Qatar	1–0	3–1	2010 FIFA World Cup qualification
14	15 June 2008	Khalifa International Stadium, Al Rayyan, Qatar	Qatar	2–0	3–1	2010 FIFA World Cup qualification
15	15 October 2008	Suncorp Stadium, Brisbane, Australia	Qatar	2–0	4–0	2010 FIFA World Cup qualification
16	15 October 2008	Suncorp Stadium, Brisbane, Australia	Qatar	3–0	4–0	2010 FIFA World Cup qualification
17	14 November 2009	Sultan Qaboos Sports Complex, Muscat, Oman	Oman	2–1	2–1	2011 AFC Asian Cup qualification
18	25 January 2011	Khalifa International Stadium, Al Rayyan, Qatar	Uzbekistan	4–0	6–0	2011 Asian Cup
19	29 February 2012	Melbourne Rectangular Stadium, Melbourne, Australia	Saudi Arabia	4–2	4–2	2014 FIFA World Cup qualification
20	3 December 2012	Mong Kok Stadium, Hong Kong	Hong Kong	1–0	1–0	2013 EAFF East Asian Cup

== Honours ==
Feyenoord

- UEFA Cup: 2001–02

Australia

- FIFA Confederations Cup: 3rd place, 2001
- AFC Asian Cup: runner-up, 2011
- OFC Nations Cup: 2000, 2004

Australia U-20

- OFC U-19 Men's Championship: 1997

Australia U-17

- OFC U-17 Championship: 1995

Individual

- NSL U21 Player of the Year: 1997–98
- Australian Sports Medal: 2000
- Oceania Footballer of the Year: 2002
- A-League All Stars: 2013
