= Seveci Rokotakala =

Fijian footballer

Personal information
- Date of birth: 29 May 1978 (age 48)
- Place of birth: Fiji
- Position: Midfielder

Senior career*
Years	Team	Apps	(Gls)
2002–2007	Lautoka		
2008–2021	Navua		

International career^{‡}
2004–2011	Fiji	24	(5)
Medal record
Men's football
Representing Fiji
Pacific Games
Gold medal – first place	2003 Fiji
- * Club domestic league appearances and goals as of 14 June 2018 ‡ National team caps and goals as of 14 June 2018

Seveci Rokotakala (born 29 May 1978) is a footballer who played as a midfielder for Navua in the Senior League (Second Tier) and the Fiji national team. He is also a councilman of the Namosi Provincial Council.

== Honours ==
Fiji

- Pacific Games: Gold Medalist, 2003
