= Jean Maleb =

Vanuatuan association football player

Jean Victor Maleb
Personal information
- Full name: Jean Emmanuel Victor Maleb
- Date of birth: 7 July 1986 (age 40)
- Place of birth: Vanuatu
- Position: Striker

Senior career*
Years	Team	Apps	(Gls)
–2004	Shepherds United		
2004	Southern United		
2007–2011	Yatel		

International career
2004–2007	Vanuatu	11	(5)
Medal record
Men's football
Representing Vanuatu
Pacific Games
Bronze medal – third place	2007 Samoa
- * Club domestic league appearances and goals

Jean Emmanuel Victor Maleb (born 7 July 1986) is a Vanuatuan former footballer who is last known to have played as a striker for Yatel. He was a Vanuatu international.

== Club career ==
Maleb has been nicknamed "Victor" and played for Otago in the Milk Cup, and was already a well known sports figure in Vanuatu at the time, even before his Southampton trial, which propelled him to greater fame in Vanuatu. e was regarded as a Vanautuan prospect. Maleb trialed for the youth academy of Southampton in the English Premier League. However, Maleb's young age and Vanuatuan nationality made it harder for him to be signed by the club. In 2004, Maleb signed for New Zealand side Southern United, even though it was planned for Maleb to play for Waitakere, where he was unable to settle. After that, he signed for Yatel in Vanuatu. After that, he played in Australia, where he was known for his goalscoring prowess.

== International career ==
Maleb played for Vanuatu national team.

== Style of play ==
Maleb manly operated as a striker and was known for his ability to shoot with both his left and right foot, his dead ball ability, and goalscoring ability. He was also known for his strength and speed.

== Career statistics ==
=== International ===
Appearances and goals by national team and year
National team	Year	Apps	Goals
Vanuatu	2004	9	4
Vanuatu	2005	–	
Vanuatu	2006	–	
Vanuatu	2007	2	1
Total		11	5

Scores and results list Vanuatu's goal tally first, score column indicates score after each Maleb goal.

List of international goals scored by Jean Maleb
No.	Date	Venue	Opponent	Score	Result	Competition
1	12 May 2004	National Soccer Stadium, Apia, Samoa	American Samoa	7–1	9–1	2006 FIFA World Cup qualification
2	12 May 2004	National Soccer Stadium, Apia, Samoa	American Samoa	9–1	9–1	2006 FIFA World Cup qualification
3	15 May 2004	National Soccer Stadium, Apia, Samoa	Samoa	3–0	3–0	2006 FIFA World Cup qualification
4	2 June 2004	Hindmarsh Stadium, Adelaide, Australia	New Zealand	3–1	4–2	2006 FIFA World Cup qualification
5	3 September 2007	National Soccer Stadium, Apia, Samoa	Tonga	4–1	4–1	2007 South Pacific Games

== Honours ==
Vanuatu

- Pacific Games: Bronze Medalist, 2007,
