= Andrew Lepani =

Papua New Guinean footballer

Personal information
- Full name: Andrew Lepani
- Date of birth: 28 August 1979 (age 47)
- Place of birth: Port Moresby, Papua New Guinea
- Height: 1.83 m (6 ft 0 in)
- Position: Midfielder

Senior career*
| Years | Team | Apps | (Gls) |
| 2002–2003 | PS United Port Moresby | | |
| 2004–2008 | Cosmos Port Moresby | | |
| 2009–2013 | Hekari United | | |

International career^{‡}
| 2003–2011 | Papua New Guinea | 12 | (5) |
- * Club domestic league appearances and goals as of 12 January 2012 ‡ National team caps and goals as of 12 January 2012

Andrew Lepani (born 28 August 1979) was born in Port Moresby, Papua New Guinea, he is a footballer who played as a midfielder for PS United Port Moresby, Cosmos Port Moresby and Hekari United in the Papua New Guinea National Soccer League and the Papua New Guinea national football team.
