= Batram Suri =

Solomon Islander footballer (born 1971)

Personal information
- Date of birth: 2 November 1971 (age 54)
- Place of birth: Laugu, British Solomon Islands
- Height: 1.75 m (5 ft 9 in)
- Positions: Striker; midfielder

Senior career*
Years	Team	Apps	(Gls)
1990–1992	Lauga		
1992–1994	AS Dragon		
1994–1999	Nelson Suburbs		
1999–2000	Football Kingz	13	(2)
2000	Lauga		
2001	Nadi		
2002–2003	YoungHeart Manawatu		
2003	Koloale		
2004–2005	JP Su'uria		
2005–2006	Nasina		
2006	Richmond Athletic		
2006–2007	Canterbury United	9	(0)
2007	Richmond Athletic		
2007–2008	Makuru		
2008–2009	Ferrymead Bays		
2009	Makuru		
2010–2011	Amical		

International career
1992–2005	Solomon Islands	48	(15)

Managerial career
- 2014–2017: Ifira Black Bird
- 2017-2018: Real Kakamora
- 2018–: Solomon Islands U-19
- 2019–: Solomon Islands U-23
Medal record
Men's football
Representing Solomon Islands
OFC Nations Cup
Runner-up	2004 Australia
Third place	2000 Tahiti
- * Club domestic league appearances and goals

Batram Suri (born 2 November 1971) is a Solomon Islands professional footballer who played as either a striker or a midfielder. As one of the few Solomon Islanders he played club football in New Zealand. He earned almost 50 caps for the national team of the Solomon Islands. At the moment, he is the head coach of the Solomon Islands women's national team and S-League side Waneagu United.

== Club career ==
Suri is the most well-known player to come out of the Solomon Islands and has previously played in New Zealand for Richmond Athletic and the Football Kingz amongst other clubs (now the New Zealand Knights), in Fiji and Tahiti and has also played for Laugu FC in his native country.

== International career ==
Suri is also one of the Solomon Islands national team's most successful players helping them reach the oceanic play-off final against Australia in 2005. He made his debut in 1992 and collected over 40 caps, also scoring a fair share of goals.

== Managerial career ==
On 16 June 2019, Suri was appointed as head coach of the Solomon Islands U-23 to guide them in the 2019 OFC Men's Olympic Qualifying Tournament from 21 September - 5 October 2019, to try to qualify for the 2020 Summer Olympics.

== Career statistics ==
=== International ===
Scores and results list Solomon Islands' goal tally first, score column indicates score after each Suri goal.

List of international goals scored by Batram Suri
No.	Date	Venue	Opponent	Score	Result	Competition	Ref.
1	9 October 1992	Stade Pater, Papeete, Tahiti	Tahiti	2–4	2–4	1994 FIFA World Cup qualification	
2	17 June 1997	Western Sydney Stadium, Parramatta, Australia	Australia	2–5	2–6	1998 FIFA World Cup qualification	
3	8 April 2000	Suva, Fiji	New Caledonia	1–0	2–4	2000 Melanesia Cup	
4	15 April 2000	Suva, Fiji	Fiji	–	2–2	2000 Melanesia Cup	
5	21 June 2000	Stade Pater, Papeete, Tahiti	Cook Islands	1–0	5–1	2000 OFC Nations Cup	
6	4 June 2001	North Harbour Stadium, North Shore, New Zealand	Cook Islands	1–1	9–1	2002 FIFA World Cup qualification	
7	8 June 2001	North Harbour Stadium, North Shore, New Zealand	Vanuatu	7–1	7–2	2002 FIFA World Cup qualification	
8	11 June 2001	North Harbour Stadium, North Shore, New Zealand	New Zealand	1–5	1–5	2002 FIFA World Cup qualification	
9	14 June 2003	Bava Park, Port Moresby, Papua New Guinea	Papua New Guinea	–	5–3	Friendly	
10	5 July 2003	Ratu Cakobau Park, Nausori, Fiji	Tuvalu	3–0	4–0	2003 South Pacific Games	
11	6 April 2004	Korman Stadium, Port Vila, Vanuatu	Vanuatu	–	2–1	Friendly	
12	19 May 2004	Lawson Tama Stadium, Honiara, Solomon Islands	Tahiti	1–1	1–1	2006 FIFA World Cup qualification	
13	29 May 2004	Marden Sports Complex, Adelaide, Australia	Vanuatu	1–0	1–0	2006 FIFA World Cup qualification	
14	2 June 2004	Hindmarsh Stadium, Adelaide, Australia	Tahiti	3–0	4–0	2004 OFC Nations Cup	
15	9 October 2004	Lawson Tama Stadium, Honiara, Solomon Islands	Australia	1–4	1–5	2004 OFC Nations Cup	

== Honours ==
=== Player ===
Solomon Islands

- OFC Nations Cup: Runner-up, 2004; 3rd place 2000

=== Individual ===
- Solomon Islands Player of the Year (1994)
- New Zealand Player of the Year (1996)
- New Zealand Top Goalscorer (1997 and 1998)
- Oceanian Player of the Year: Fourth place (1996), Tenth place (1997 and 1998), Twelfth place (2002)
