= 2004 OFC Nations Cup =

Tournament details
- Host country: Australia
- Dates: 29 May – 12 October
- Teams: 6 (from 1 confederation)
- Venues: 4 (in 3 host cities)

Final positions
- Champions: Australia (4th title)
- Runners-up: Solomon Islands
- Third place: New Zealand
- Fourth place: Fiji

Tournament statistics
- Matches played: 17
- Goals scored: 69 (4.06 per match)
- Attendance: 71,561 (4,209 per match)
- Top scorer(s): (Australia) Tim Cahill (New Zealand) Vaughan Coveny (6 goals each)

The 2004 OFC Nations Cup was the edition of the tournament for the OFC Nations Cup and doubled as the qualification tournament to the 2006 FIFA World Cup, except the two-legged final. A separate playoff between Australia and Solomon Islands was held in September 2005, for World Cup Qualifying purposes.

The competition was divided in two Group stages (the first is the Qualifying Stage), with Australia and New Zealand seeded into the second stage (Final Stage). The Oceania champion (Australia) qualified for the 2005 FIFA Confederations Cup.

== Qualification ==
The 10 teams in the first round were divided into two sections of five teams each. Each team played every other team once. The top two teams from each group then progressed to the second group stage, where they were joined by the two seeded teams.

== Venues ==
Australia (Final tournament & Final match–Second leg host)
2004 OFC Nations Cup (Australia)
2004 OFC Nations Cup (Australia)	Sydney	Adelaide	
2004 OFC Nations Cup (Australia)	Sydney Football Stadium	Hindmarsh Stadium	Marden Sports Complex
2004 OFC Nations Cup (Australia)	Capacity: 45,500	Capacity: 17,000	Capacity: 6,000
Solomon Islands (Final match–First leg host)
2004 OFC Nations Cup is located in Solomon Islands	Honiara		
2004 OFC Nations Cup is located in Solomon Islands	Lawson Tama Stadium		
2004 OFC Nations Cup is located in Solomon Islands	Capacity: 30,000		

== Squads ==
See 2004 OFC Nations Cup squads

== Final tournament ==
The four surviving members (first and second place teams from each group in stage one) of the first stage joined the two seeded teams (Australia and New Zealand) and took part in a tournament where each team played every other once in a tournament held in Adelaide, Australia.

As this doubled as the 2004 Oceania Nations Cup, the top two teams from the second group stage progressed to a two-legged final to determine the winner of the OFC Nations Cup. These two games on home-and-away basis was separate from World Cup qualifying.

The top two teams from this stage also progressed to the final stage of the 2006 Oceania World Cup qualifying tournament.

Pos	Team	Pld	W	D	L	GF	GA	GD	Pts	Qualification	Australia men's national soccer team	Solomon Islands national football team	New Zealand men's national football team	Fiji national football team	Tahiti national football team	Vanuatu national football team
1	Australia	5	4	1	0	21	3	+18	13	Advance to final	—	—	1–0	6–1	9–0	—
2	Solomon Islands	5	3	1	1	9	6	+3	10	Advance to final	2–2	—	—	—	—	—
3	New Zealand	5	3	0	2	17	5	+12	9		—	3–0	—	—	10–0	—
4	Fiji	5	1	1	3	3	10	−7	4		—	1–2	0–2	—	—	1–0
5	Tahiti	5	1	1	3	2	24	−22	4		—	0–4	—	0–0	—	2–1
6	Vanuatu	5	1	0	4	5	9	−4	3		0–3	0–1	4–2	—	—	—

Rules for classification: Tiebreakers
29 May 2004

Vanuatu	0–1	Solomon Islands
	Report	Batram Suri 51' (pen.)

Marden Sports Complex, Adelaide
Attendance: 200
Referee: Mark Shield (Australia)
29 May 2004

Tahiti	0–0	Fiji
	Report

Hindmarsh Stadium, Adelaide
Attendance: 3,000
Referee: Stefano Farina (Italy)
29 May 2004

Australia	1–0	New Zealand
Bresciano 40'	Report

Hindmarsh Stadium, Adelaide
Attendance: 12,130
Referee: Claus Bo Larsen (Denmark)

31 May 2004

New Zealand	3–0	Solomon Islands
Fisher 36'; Oughton 81'; Lines 90'	Report

Marden Sports Complex, Adelaide
Attendance: 217
Referee: Eduardo Iturralde González (Spain)
31 May 2004

Australia	9–0	Tahiti
Cahill 14', 47'; Skoko 43'; Simon 44' (o.g.); Sterjovski 51', 61', 74'; Zdrilic 85'; Chipperfield 89'	Report

Hindmarsh Stadium, Adelaide
Attendance: 1,200
Referee: Harry Attison (Vanuatu)
31 May 2004

Fiji	1–0	Vanuatu
Toma 73'	Report

Hindmarsh Stadium, Adelaide
Attendance: 500
Referee: Charles Ariiotima (Tahiti)

2 June 2004

Australia	6–1	Fiji
Madaschi 6', 50'; Cahill 39', 66', 75'; Elrich 89'	Report	Gataurua 19'

Marden Sports Complex, Adelaide
Attendance: 2,200
Referee: Eduardo Iturralde González (Spain)
2 June 2004

Tahiti	0–4	Solomon Islands
	Report	Fa'arodo 9'; Menapi 14', 80'; Batram Suri 42'

Hindmarsh Stadium, Adelaide
Attendance: 50
Referee: Leone Rakaroi (Fiji)
2 June 2004

Vanuatu	4–2	New Zealand
Chilia 37'; Bibi 64'; Maleb 72'; Qorig 88'	Report	Coveny 61', 75'

Hindmarsh Stadium, Adelaide
Attendance: 356
Referee: Stefano Farina (Italy)

4 June 2004

New Zealand	10–0	Tahiti
Coveny 6', 38', 45'; Fisher 16', 22', 63'; Jones 72'; Oughton 74'; Nelsen 82', 87'	Report

Marden Sports Complex, Adelaide
Attendance: 200
Referee: Mark Shield (Australia)
4 June 2004

Fiji	1–2	Solomon Islands
Toma 21'	Report	Kakai 16'; Houkarawa 82'

Hindmarsh Stadium, Adelaide
Attendance: 1,500
Referee: Harry Attison (Vanuatu)
4 June 2004

Vanuatu	0–3	Australia
	Report	Aloisi 25', 85'; Emerton 81'

Hindmarsh Stadium, Adelaide
Attendance: 4,000
Referee: Charles Ariiotima (Tahiti)

6 June 2004

Tahiti	2–1	Vanuatu
Temataua 40'; Wajoka 89'	Report	Iwai 23'

Marden Sports Complex, Adelaide
Attendance: 300
Referee: Leone Rakaroi (Fiji)
6 June 2004

Fiji	0–2	New Zealand
	Report	Bunce 8'; Coveny 56'

Hindmarsh Stadium, Adelaide
Attendance: 2,000
Referee: Claus Bo Larsen (Denmark)
6 June 2004

Solomon Islands	2–2	Australia
Menapi 43', 75'	Report	Cahill 50'; Emerton 52'

Hindmarsh Stadium, Adelaide
Attendance: 3,500
Referee: Eduardo Iturralde González (Spain)

== Final ==
The final of the 2004 Oceania Nations Cup was a two-legged home and away final between the top two teams from the second group stage.

Team 1	Agg.	Team 2	1st leg	2nd leg
Solomon Islands	1–11	Australia	1–5	0–6

9 October 2004

Solomon Islands	1–5	Australia
Batram Suri 60'	Report	Skoko 5', 28'; Milicic 19'; Emerton 43'; Elrich 79'

Lawson Tama Stadium, Honiara
Attendance: 21,000
Referee: Peter O'Leary (New Zealand)

12 October 2004

Australia	6–0	Solomon Islands
Milicic 5'; Kewell 8'; Vidmar 60'; Thompson 79'; Elrich 82'; Emerton 89'	Report

Sydney Football Stadium, Sydney
Attendance: 19,208
Referee: Leone Rakaroi (Fiji)

Australia won 11–1 on aggregate and became the 2004 Oceania Nations Cup Champions. They also qualified for the 2005 Confederations Cup.

Although the second round of 2004 OFC Nations Cup doubled the second round of 2006 FIFA World Cup Oceanian qualification, the final play-off for the World Cup was held separately. Australia defeated Solomon Islands again, winning 9–1 on aggregate, and advanced to a play-off against the CONMEBOL (South American) nation Uruguay.

== Goalscorers ==
There were 69 goals scored in 17 matches, for an average of 4.06 goals per match.

6 goals

- (Australia) Tim Cahill
- (New Zealand) Vaughan Coveny

4 goals

- (Australia) Brett Emerton
- (New Zealand) Brent Fisher
- (Solomon Islands) Commins Menapi

3 goals

- (Australia) Ahmad Elrich
- (Australia) Josip Skoko
- (Australia) Mile Sterjovski
- (Solomon Islands) Batram Suri

2 goals

- (Australia) John Aloisi
- (Australia) Adrian Madaschi
- (Australia) Ante Milicic
- (Fiji) Veresa Toma
- (New Zealand) Ryan Nelsen
- (New Zealand) Duncan Oughton

1 goal

- (Australia) Mark Bresciano
- (Australia) Scott Chipperfield
- (Australia) Harry Kewell
- (Australia) Archie Thompson
- (Australia) Tony Vidmar
- (Australia) David Zdrilic
- (Fiji) Laisiasa Gataurua
- (New Zealand) Che Bunce
- (New Zealand) Neil Jones
- (New Zealand) Aaran Lines
- (Solomon Islands) Henry Fa'arodo
- (Solomon Islands) Mahlon Houkarawa
- (Solomon Islands) Paul Kakai
- (French Polynesia) Gabriel Wajoka
- (French Polynesia) Axel Temataua
- (Vanuatu) Lexa Bibi
- (Vanuatu) Richard Iwai
- (Vanuatu) Jean Maleb
- (Vanuatu) Seimata Chilia
- (Vanuatu) Alphose Qorig

1 own goal

- (French Polynesia) Vincent Simon (against Australia)
