= Vincent Simon (footballer) =

Tahitian footballer (born 1983)

Vincent Simon Lo-Shing
Personal information
- Full name: Vincent Simon
- Date of birth: 28 September 1983 (age 43)
- Place of birth: Tahiti
- Height: 1.65 m (5 ft 5 in)
- Position: Right-back

Youth career
- A.S. Pirae

Senior career*
| Years | Team | Apps | (Gls) |
| 2003–2011 | A.S. Pirae | | |
| 2011–2013 | A.S. Dragon | | |
| 2014–2016 | A.S. Pirae | | |

International career^{‡}
| 2004–2016 | Tahiti | 25 | (1) |
Medal record
Men's football
Representing Tahiti
OFC Nations Cup
| Winner | 2012 Solomon Islands |
- * Club domestic league appearances and goals ‡ National team caps and goals as of 12 June 2016

Vincent Simon Lo-Shing (born 28 September 1983) is a football player from Tahiti currently playing for A.S. Pirae and for the Tahiti national football team. He made his debut for the national team on 2004 against Cook Islands.

At the 2013 FIFA Confederations Cup Simon failed a drug test for tuaminoheptane doping. He was suspended until 7 February 2014.

== International goals ==
| # | Date | Venue | Opponent | Score | Result | Competition |
|---|---|---|---|---|---|---|
| 1 | 19 May 2004 | Lawson Tama Stadium, Honiara | Solomon Islands | 1–0 | 1–1 | 2006 FIFA World Cup qualification |

== Honours ==
A.S. Dragon

- Tahiti First Division:

Winner (1): 2012

Tahiti

- OFC Nations Cup: 2012

== International career statistics ==
Tahiti national team
| Year | Apps | Goals |
|---|---|---|
| 2004 | 8 | 1 |
| 2012 | 12 | 0 |
| 2013 | 1 | 0 |
| Total | 21 | 1 |
