= Laisiasa Gataurua =

Fijian footballer

Personal information
- Full name: Laisiasa Gataurua Vosailagi
- Date of birth: 25 November 1981 (age 44)
- Place of birth: Tavua, Fiji
- Position: Midfielder

Senior career*
Years	Team	Apps	(Gls)
2003	Fiji Olympians		
2004–2014	Suva		

International career
2003–2004	Fiji	13	(5)
- * Club domestic league appearances and goals

Laisiasa Gataurua Vosailagi (born 25 November 1981), is a retired Fijian footballer who played as a midfielder. He represented Fiji at the 2003 South Pacific Games.

== Career statistics ==
=== International ===
National team	Year	Apps	Goals
Fiji	2003	6	1
Fiji	2004	7	4
Total		13	5

=== International goals ===
Scores and results list Fiji's goal tally first.

No	Date	Venue	Opponent	Score	Result	Competition
1.	5 July 2003	Vodafone Ratu Cakobau Park, Nausori, Fiji	Kiribati	3–0	12–0	2003 South Pacific Games
2.	12 May 2004	National Soccer Stadium, Apia, Samoa	Papua New Guinea	3–2	4–2	2006 FIFA World Cup qualification
3.	15 May 2004	National Soccer Stadium, Apia, Samoa	American Samoa	9–0	11–0	2006 FIFA World Cup qualification
4.	15 May 2004	National Soccer Stadium, Apia, Samoa	American Samoa	10–0	11–0	2006 FIFA World Cup qualification
5.	2 June 2004	Marden Sports Complex, Adelaide, Australia	Australia	1–1	1–6	2004 OFC Nations Cup
