= List of football clubs in Samoa =

This is a list of association football clubs based in Samoa.

== The football clubs ==
- AST Central United
- Adidas
- Gold Star Sogi
- Gruz Azul
- Kiwi FC
- Konica
- Lepea
- Lupe o le Soaga (Magiagi)
- Moata'a FC
- Moaula United
- Sinamoga
- Sogi
- University of South Pacific
- Vaipuna
- Vaiusu
- Vaivase-Tai
- Vaitele Uta
