= 2019 Samoa National League =

Samoa National League
- Season: 2019
- Champions: Lupe o le Soaga
- OFC Champions League: Lupe o le Soaga

The 2019 Samoa National League is the 29th edition of the Samoa National League, the top association football league of Samoa organised by the Football Federation Samoa. This season will kick off on September 14, and will be competed by 12 teams from the island of Upolu. Many league games took place in front of dozens of spectators.

== Teams ==
Team changes from the previous season:

- Fa'atoia United and Sogi were promoted from the Samoa First Division to the Samoa National League.
- Adidas were relegated from the Samoa National League to the Samoa First Division.
- Vaimoso were excluded from the Samoa National League.

Samoa National League	Samoa First Division	Samoa Women League
Level on pyramid – 1	Level on pyramid – 2	Level on pyramid – 1
Kiwi; Lepea; Lupe o le Soaga; Moaula United; Moata'a; Togafuafua Saints; Fa'atoia United; Sogi; Vaipuna; Vaitele Uta; Vaiusu; Vaivase-Tai	Adidas; Faleasiu; Lotopa F.C.; Lupe o le Soaga B; Kiwi B; Moaula United B; Vaiusu B; Lepea B; Central United; Vaivase-Tai B; Sogi B; Togafuafua B; Vaitele Uta B; Vaipuna B	Togafuafua Women; Vaivase-Tai Women; Sogi Women; Vaipuna Women; Vaiusu Women; Moaula United Women; Faleasiu Women; Lepea B Women; Lotopa F.C. Women; Adidas Women; Fa'atoia United Women; Moata'a Women; Kiwi Women; Lupe o le Soaga Women

All teams and leagues are for the 2019/20 season

== League table ==
The league was initially postponed because of state of emergency declared by government on 16 November 2019 due to a measles outbreak; After a meeting between Football Federation Samoa and teams representants, Lupe ole Soaga were declared champions.

Pos	Team	Pld	W	D	L	GF	GA	GD	Pts	Qualification or relegation
1	Lupe o le Soaga (C, Q)	16	14	0	2	96	15	+81	42	Qualification to OFC Champions League qualifying stage
2	Kiwi	16	13	1	2	45	15	+30	40	
3	Vaipuna	16	11	2	3	61	19	+42	35	
4	Vaitele Uta	16	10	2	4	43	19	+24	32	
5	Vaivase-Tai	16	9	1	6	55	34	+21	28	
6	Vaiusu	16	8	2	6	21	19	+2	26	
7	Lepea	15	7	1	7	31	22	+9	22	
8	Togafuafua Saints	15	6	2	7	31	42	−11	20	
9	Sogi	16	5	2	9	30	43	−13	17	
10	Moaula United	16	3	2	11	21	47	−26	11	
11	Fa'atoia United	16	1	1	14	13	88	−75	4	
12	Moata'a	16	0	0	16	11	95	−84	0	

Source: Samoa Football Federation
(C) Champions; (Q) Qualified for the phase indicated
