= 2014–15 Samoa National League =

2014-15 Samoa National League
- Season: 2014–15
- Champions: Lupe o le Soaga
- Matches played: 66
- Goals scored: 294 (4.45 per match)

The 2014–15 Samoa National League was the 25th edition of the Samoa National League, the top league of the Football Federation Samoa. This season was won by Lupe o le Soaga for the second recorded time.

== Standings ==
Pos	Team	Pld	W	D	L	GF	GA	GD	Pts
1	Lupe Ole Soaga	11	10	0	1	36	8	+28	30
2	Vaimoso	11	9	1	1	48	12	+36	28
3	Kiwi	11	7	2	2	30	13	+17	23
4	Moaula United FC	11	6	2	3	28	20	+8	20
5	Adidas Soccer Club	11	6	1	4	30	18	+12	19
6	One Way Wind	11	4	1	6	13	39	−26	13
7	Vaitoloa FC	11	3	3	5	25	23	+2	12
8	BSL Vaitele Uta	11	3	3	5	24	22	+2	12
9	AST Central United	11	3	2	6	22	50	−28	11
10	Vaivase-tai	11	2	4	5	16	21	−5	10
11	Vaipuna SC	11	1	4	6	19	23	−4	7
12	Leuvaa SC	11	0	1	10	3	41	−38	1
