= AST Central United FC =

Samoan football club

Central United FC
- Full name: AST Central United FC
- Ground: Toleafoa J.S Blatter Soccer Stadium
- League: Samoa National League
- 2012–13: 8th
Home colours	Away colours

Central United FC is a Samoan football club. It currently plays in the Samoa National League.

== History ==
The first record of Central United competing in the Samoa National League is in 2005. Their final league position is unknown, but it is noted that they led the league by one point from Vaivase-tai after round nine, but eventually lost out to Tunaimoto Breeze. they also made the semi-finals of the Samoa Cup that season, beating Mynas Aele 14–1 in round 1.

Their final positions in 2006 and 2007 are not known, although they definitely did not get to the league final in 2006 and although no league table is available for 2007, it is assumed that they were relegated as sources record that they were promoted back to the National League the following season along with Vaitoloa United.

Their first season back in the Premier league, called the SFSF-NC National League for the 2009–10 season was not successful. They were excluded halfway through the season along with USP Soccer Club although they were not relegated as they participated in the 2010–11 season, finishing fifth behind Vaivase-tai but ahead of Goldstar Sogi on 22 points, winning six and drawing four of their 18 games.

The league table for the 2011–12 season is not available, but they cannot have been relegated, as they took part in the 2012–13 season, finishing 8th, ahead of Vaivase-tai, but behind Apia Youth on twenty points, winning six and drawing two of their 22 games.

== Squad ==
As of 2008 season:

Note: Flags indicate national team as defined under FIFA eligibility rules; some limited exceptions apply. Players may hold more than one non-FIFA nationality.

No.	Pos.	Nation	Player
1	DF	SAM	Pualele Lemana
