= Paul Ualesi =

Samoan football manager (born 1987)

Personal information
- Full name: Faaeanuu Paul Ualesi
- Date of birth: 22 March 1987 (age 39)
- Place of birth: Apia, Samoa

Team information
- Current team: Pago Youth (Manager)

Managerial career
- Years: Team
- 2014–2023: Lupe o le Soaga
- 2016: Samoa U20
- 2019: Samoa
- 2023–2024: Royal Puma
- 2026–: Pago Youth
- ‡ National team caps and goals as of 14:29, 7 December 2023 (UTC)

Paul Ualesi (born 22 March 1987) is a Samoan association football manager who currently manages Pago Youth FC of the FFAS Senior League.

== Managerial career ==
Ualesi took charge at Lupe o le Soaga SC of the Samoa National League by 2014. He led the club to the Group Stage of the 2014–15 OFC Champions League. This was the first time the club qualified for the continental competition. The club defeated Tonga's Lotohaʻapai United and FC SKBC of American Samoa to qualify. In the Group Stage, Lupe o le Soaga earned a draw with AS Pirae of Tahiti, and two defeats. Although his club failed to qualify for the 2016 edition of the tournament, Ualesi took charge of the Samoa U20 team that year for the 2016 OFC U-20 Championship. The team opened the First Round with a 5–0 victory over American Samoa. Despite the performance, Ualesi stated that the team needed to improve its discipline in upcoming matches. In the team's next match, it suffered a 0–1 to the Cook Islands, making advancing very difficult. Samoa drew Tonga 3–3 in the final match, ending the tournament for both nations.

The following season, he led Lupe o le Soaga back into the OFC Champions League. The club qualified for the Group Stage again that year. After finishing as runners-up in 2018 OFC Cup qualification, the team again advanced to the Group Stage. In 2019, Ualesi took charge of the Samoa senior national team for the 2019 Pacific Games, hosted by Samoa. The team earned a victory against Tonga and defeats to New Zealand U23, Papua New Guinea, and Vanuatu. The following season, he was still the head coach at Lupe o le Soaga and won the club's second consecutive league title, again qualifying for the Group Stage of the 2020 OFC Champions League which was heavily modified because of the COVID-19 pandemic. In the Group Stage, the club defeated major Fijian club Ba FC to earn the first-ever Group Stage win by a Samoan club in the competition.

In 2023, Ualesi led Lupe o le Soaga back to the 2023 OFC Champions League. During qualification, the club defeated American Samoa's Ilaoa and To'omata SC 13–0, ultimately qualifying for the Group Stage again. Later that year, he moved to Royal Puma FC of American Samoa's FFAS Senior League for the 2023 season. The club went on to win its first-ever league title that year with Ualesi being named Coach of the Year.

Ualesi moved for fellow American Samoan side Pago Youth FC in 2026. That season, Pago Youth was crowned FFAS Senior League champion as Ualesi steered the club during the 2026 OFC Men's Champions League qualifying stage

=== International managerial record ===
As of match played on 18 July 2019

Managerial record by team and tenure
Team	From	To	Record								Ref
Team	From	To	G	W	D	L	GF	GA	GD	Win %	Ref
Samoa U20	2016	2016	3	1	1	1	8	4	+4	33.33	
Samoa	2019	2019	4	1	0	3	3	22	−19	25.00	
(American Samoa) Royal Puma	2023		14	12	1	1	79	9	+70	85.71	

== Honours ==
=== Manager ===
Lupe ole Soaga

- Samoa National League

Champions: 2014/2015, 2016, 2017, 2019, 2020, 2021
Runner-up: 2018, 2023

Royal Puma

- FFAS Senior League: 2023

=== Individual ===
- FFAS Senior League Coach of the Year: 2023
