= 2016 Samoa National League =

- Season: 2016
- Champions: Lupe o le Soaga

The 2016 Samoa National League was the 26th edition of the Samoa National League, the top league of the Football Federation Samoa. This season was won by Lupe o le Soaga for the third recorded time.

== Standings ==
Pos	Team	Pld	W	D	L	GF	GA	GD	Pts	Qualification
1	Lupe o le Soaga	11	9	2	0	76	12	+64	29	
2	Vaimoso	11	9	2	0	42	11	+31	29	
3	BSL Vaitele Uta	11	8	0	3	21	19	+2	24	
4	Vailima Kiwi	11	6	2	3	71	11	+60	20	
5	Moaula United	11	6	2	3	45	23	+22	20	
6	Vaiusu	11	6	1	4	35	19	+16	19	
7	Vaivase	11	5	4	2	33	17	+16	19	
8	Adidas	11	3	1	7	17	33	−16	10	
9	Vaitoloa	11	2	3	6	28	29	−1	9	
10	Vaipuna	11	2	1	8	32	57	−25	7	
11	Moamoa Roosters	11	1	0	10	10	74	−64	3	Relegation Playoff
12	Central United	11	0	0	11	9	111	−102	0	Relegation Playoff

Rules for classification: 1) points; 2) goal difference; 3) number of goals scored.
