= 2020 Samoa National League =

Samoa National League
- Season: 2020

The 2020 Samoa National League is the 30th edition of the Samoa National League, the top association football league of Samoa organised by the Football Federation Samoa. This season began on 18 August 2020. Lupe o le Soaga are the defending champions.

The winner of the first round will qualify for the 2021 OFC Champions League, while the winner of the top eight round will qualify for the 2022 OFC Champions League.

The league was won by Lupe o le Soaga.

Many games take place at the 3,500-capacity National Soccer Stadium, Apia.

== Teams ==
A total of 12 teams from the island of Upolu. There were no promotion and relegation from the 2019 Samoa National League.

- Kiwi
- Lepea
- Lupe o le Soaga
- Moaula United
- Moata'a
- Togafuafua Saints
- Fa'atoia United
- Sogi
- Vaipuna
- Vaitele Uta
- Vaiusu
- Vaivase-Tai

== Stadiums ==
Team	Location	Stadium	Capacity
Lupe o le Soaga	Tuanaimato	National Soccer Stadium, Apia	3,500
Vaipuna SC			
Goldstar Sogi FC	Tuanaimato	National Soccer Stadium, Apia	3,500
BSL Vaitele Uta SC			
Vaivase-Tai FC	Tuanaimato	National Soccer Stadium, Apia	3,500
Fa'atoia United			
Vailima Kiwi FC	Tuanaimato	National Soccer Stadium, Apia	3,500
Moata'a FC	Tuanaimato	National Soccer Stadium, Apia	3,500
Lepea SC			
Vaiusu SC			
Togafuafua Saints			
Moaula United FC	Tuanaimato	National Soccer Stadium, Apia	3,500

== First round ==
Pos	Team	Pld	W	D	L	GF	GA	GD	Pts	Qualification or relegation
1	Lupe o le Soaga (C, Q)	11	11	0	0	67	5	+62	33	Qualification to OFC Champions League qualifying stage and Top eight round
2	Vaipuna (Q)	11	8	2	1	49	12	+37	26	Qualification to Top eight round
3	Vaitele Uta (Q)	11	8	1	2	45	17	+28	25	Qualification to Top eight round
4	Vaivase-Tai (Q)	11	7	3	1	32	10	+22	24	Qualification to Top eight round
5	Sogi (Q)	11	6	2	3	35	19	+16	20	Qualification to Top eight round
6	Kiwi (Q)	11	5	2	4	23	20	+3	17	Qualification to Top eight round
7	Fa'atoia United (Q)	11	3	2	6	22	38	−16	11	Qualification to Top eight round
8	Togafuafua Saints (Q)	11	3	1	7	16	43	−27	10	Qualification to Top eight round
9	Vaiusu	11	2	2	7	17	28	−11	8	
10	Moata'a	11	2	1	8	15	55	−40	7	
11	Lepea	11	1	1	9	10	42	−32	4	
12	Moaula United	11	1	1	9	11	53	−42	4	

Updated to match(es) played on 29 October 2020. Source: RSSSF
(C) Champions; (Q) Qualified for the phase indicated
