= 2004 Samoa National League =

Samoa National League
- Season: 2004
- Champions: Strickland Brothers Lepea

The 2004 Samoa National League, or also known as the Upolo First Division, was the 16th edition of the Samoa National League, the top league of the Football Federation Samoa. Strickland Brothers Lepea won their third consecutive title.

== Standings ==
Pos	Team	Pld	W	D	L	GF	GA	GD	Pts
1	Strickland Brothers Lepea	9	7	2	0	24	5	+19	23
2	Lupe Ole Soaga	9	7	1	1	15	7	+8	22
3	Goldstar Sogi	9	5	2	2	22	8	+14	17
4	Kiwi	9	5	2	2	20	10	+10	17
5	AST Central United	9	5	0	4	16	14	+2	15
6	Moamoa	9	3	1	5	6	17	−11	10
7	Hosanna	9	2	1	6	6	19	−13	7
8	OSM Sinamoga	9	1	3	5	12	22	−10	6
9	Moata'a	9	2	0	7	7	22	−15	6
10	Vaivase-tai	9	1	2	6	6	10	−4	5
