= Apia Youth =

- Ground: Toleafoa J.S Blatter Soccer Stadium
- League: Samoa National League
- 2012–13: 7th
Home colours	Away colours

Apia Youth is a Samoan football club. It currently plays in Samoa National League.

== History ==
The first recorded appearance of Apia Youth is in the lower reaches of the Samoan league system in 2007, where they are noted as having lost to both Kiwi and Moata'a. Although the source indicates that there is confusion over whether the results for non-Premier League matches refer to Division 1 or 2, the following season the club were playing in the Premier League. Although their final position is not known, they are recorded as having played a match against Moaula United. In 2009–10, they finished fifth, ahead of Adidas Soccer Club but behind Goldstar Sogi, on 30 points, winning nine and drawing three of their twenty matches. Their position in the 2011–12 season is not known however, they were not relegated that season as they participated in the 2012–13 Samoa National League, finishing 7th, ahead of Central United FC but behind Vaimoso, winning 11 and drawing one of their 22 games.
