= 2017 Samoa National League =

Samoa National League
- Season: 2017
- Champions: Lupe ole Soaga

The 2017 Samoa National League is the 27th edition of the Samoa National League, the top league of the Football Federation Samoa. This season was competed by 12 teams from the island of Upolu and started on 16 September 2017.

The league was won by Lupe ole Soaga and they qualified for the 2018 OFC Champions League.

== Standings ==
Incomplete table (missing results rounds 4 and 8):

Pos	Team	Pld	W	D	L	GF	GA	GD	Pts
1	Lupe o le Soaga	9	9	0	0	56	3	+53	27
2	Lepea	9	8	0	1	46	15	+31	24
3	Vaiusu	9	6	0	3	27	18	+9	18
4	Kiwi	9	6	0	3	20	13	+7	18
5	BSL Vaitele Uta	9	6	0	3	22	18	+4	18
6	Moaula United	9	5	0	4	25	24	+1	15
7	Vaivase-Tai	9	4	0	5	17	30	−13	12
8	Togafuafua Saints	9	3	1	5	22	31	−9	10
9	Vaimoso	9	3	0	6	20	40	−20	9
10	Adidas	9	2	1	6	16	29	−13	7
11	Vaipuna	9	1	0	8	18	39	−21	3
12	Vaitoloa	9	0	0	9	8	37	−29	0

Rules for classification: 1) points; 2) goal difference; 3) number of goals scored.
