= 2018 Samoa National League =

Samoa National League
- Season: 2018
- Champions: Kiwi

The 2018 Samoa National League is the 28th edition of the Samoa National League, the top association football league of Samoa organised by the Football Federation Samoa. This season kicked off on 4 August 2018, and will be competed by 12 teams from the island of Upolu. The winner will qualify for the 2019 OFC Champions League.

== Standings ==
| Pos | Team | Pld | W | D | L | GF | GA | GD | Pts | Qualification or relegation |
|---|---|---|---|---|---|---|---|---|---|---|
| 1 | Kiwi | 21 | 17 | 3 | 1 | 133 | 18 | +115 | 54 | Qualification to 2019 OFC Champions League |
| 2 | Lupe o le Soaga | 21 | 17 | 3 | 1 | 107 | 10 | +97 | 54 | |
| 3 | Vaipuna | 21 | 12 | 5 | 4 | 75 | 34 | +41 | 41 | |
| 4 | Moaula United | 21 | 11 | 6 | 4 | 78 | 34 | +44 | 39 | |
| 5 | Vaitele Uta | 21 | 10 | 5 | 6 | 56 | 40 | +16 | 35 | |
| 6 | Vaivase-Tai | 21 | 9 | 3 | 9 | 52 | 55 | −3 | 30 | |
| 7 | Lepea | 21 | 9 | 2 | 10 | 64 | 56 | +8 | 29 | |
| 8 | Vaiusu | 21 | 6 | 6 | 9 | 42 | 61 | −19 | 24 | |
| 9 | Moata'a | 21 | 6 | 1 | 14 | 37 | 82 | −45 | 19 | |
| 10 | Togafuafua Saints | 21 | 5 | 1 | 15 | 44 | 106 | −62 | 16 | |
| 11 | Adidas | 21 | 1 | 1 | 19 | 14 | 137 | −123 | 4 | Relegation playoff |
| 12 | Vaimoso | 11 | 0 | 0 | 11 | 6 | 75 | −69 | 0 | Relegated (Excluded after three no shows) |
