= 2026 OFC U-16 Men's Championship squad =

Each team could register a maximum of 23, including at least three goalkeepers.

Players born on or after 1 January 2010 were eligible to participate. The age listed for each player is their age as of 12 July 2026, the first day of the tournament.

== Group A ==
=== Fiji ===
The final squad was announced on 4 July 2026.

Head coach: Sunil Kumar

No.	Pos.	Player	Date of birth (age)	Club
1	GK	Ratu Natirivi		(Fiji Football Association) Suva
22	GK	Setoki Vatanitawake		(Fiji Football Association) Lautoka
2	DF	Junaid Nabi		(Fiji Football Association) Nadi
3	DF	Aaron Veitamani	17 November 2010 (aged 15)	(Fiji Football Association) Ba
4	DF	Somit Maharaj		(Fiji Football Association) Labasa
5	DF	Jerry Levea		(Fiji Football Association) Nadroga
11	DF	Joshua Prasad		(Fiji Football Association) Nasinu
17	DF	Ahmad Shameem		(Fiji Football Association) Ba
6	MF	Jone Loga		(Fiji Football Association) Ba
7	MF	Shahil Prasad		(Fiji Football Association) Suva
8	MF	Simione Poē		(Fiji Football Association) Ba
10	MF	Darshil Raj		(Fiji Football Association) Suva
12	MF	Navitesh Kumar	6 March 2010 (aged 16)	(Fiji Football Association) Labasa
13	MF	Ryan Swami		(Fiji Football Association) Nadi
15	MF	Lekima Rokodragi		(Fiji Football Association) Navua
9	FW	Maikeli Ratuove		(Fiji Football Association) Nadroga
14	FW	Isoa Baselala		(Fiji Football Association) Rewa
16	FW	Mohammed Watson		(Fiji Football Association) Nasinu
18	FW	Rayyaan Mohammed		(Fiji Football Association) Suva
19	FW	Zaman Shah		(Fiji Football Association) Ba
20	FW	Kirikiti Biu		(Fiji Football Association) Marist Brothers High School
21	FW	Daniel Raicama		(Fiji Football Association) Labasa

=== New Caledonia ===
The final squad was announced on 4 July 2026.

Head coach: Valérian Hummel

No.	Pos.	Player	Date of birth (age)	Club
1	GK	Jérémy Féré		(New Caledonian Football Federation) Magenta
16	GK	Jaerson Pian		(New Caledonian Football Federation) Lössi
21	GK	Octave Hautbois		(New Caledonian Football Federation) Magenta
2	DF	Linton Iwan		(New Caledonian Football Federation) Magenta
3	DF	Steevy Andrew		(New Caledonian Football Federation) Mont-Dore
4	DF	Nino Lages		(New Caledonian Football Federation) Magenta
13	DF	Ky-Mhany Waimo		(New Caledonian Football Federation) Lössi
14	DF	Titouan Deniaud		(New Caledonian Football Federation) Mont-Dore
17	DF	Valdo Tyeanouen		(New Caledonian Football Federation) Gaïca
5	MF	Matahi Wimian		(New Caledonian Football Federation) Païta
6	MF	Andrew Poaracagu		(New Caledonian Football Federation) Gaïca
7	MF	Jean-Christ Wea		(New Caledonian Football Federation) Mont-Dore
8	MF	Kevin Hoang		(New Caledonian Football Federation) Magenta
11	MF	Adolph Laoumana		(New Caledonian Football Federation) Magenta
15	MF	Aynerick Sari		(New Caledonian Football Federation) Païta
9	FW	Lisandro Bessières		(New Caledonian Football Federation) Mont-Dore
10	FW	Matéo Desouches		(New Caledonian Football Federation) Lössi
12	FW	Maelann Péarou		(New Caledonian Football Federation) Magenta
18	FW	Lyssandro Martinez		(New Caledonian Football Federation) Lössi

=== Papua New Guinea ===
The final squad was announced on 6 July 2026.

Head coach: Mathias Apo

No.	Pos.	Player	Date of birth (age)	Club
1	GK	Luther Rodney		(Papua New Guinea Football Association) PNGFA Academy
20	GK	Darren David		(Papua New Guinea Football Association) Hekari United
22	GK	Junior Sabua		(Papua New Guinea Football Association) Lae City
2	DF	Giob Yalu		(Papua New Guinea Football Association) PNGFA Academy
3	DF	Jaru Eron		(Papua New Guinea Football Association) Port Moresby Strikers
4	DF	Bomecge Basananuc		(Papua New Guinea Football Association) PNGFA Academy
5	DF	Ryan Blu		(Papua New Guinea Football Association) Lae City
11	DF	Billson Kisi		(Papua New Guinea Football Association) Port Moresby Strikers
12	DF	Solomon Ata		(Papua New Guinea Football Association) PNGFA Academy
14	DF	Mosley Michael		(Papua New Guinea Football Association) Lae City
17	DF	Othniel Raymond		(Papua New Guinea Football Association) Port Moresby Strikers
6	MF	Emmanuel Ian		(Papua New Guinea Football Association) Hekari United
7	MF	Henry Bill		(Papua New Guinea Football Association) Hekari United
8	MF	Mathew Sopo		(Papua New Guinea Football Association) PNGFA Academy
9	MF	Nigel Gunemba		(Papua New Guinea Football Association) Lae City
13	MF	John Millis		(Papua New Guinea Football Association) PNGFA Academy
15	MF	Bafeng David		(Papua New Guinea Football Association) Lae City
16	MF	Toka Goro		(Papua New Guinea Football Association) Hekari United
18	MF	Andrew Lepani		(Papua New Guinea Football Association) Port Moresby Strikers
21	MF	Iga Steven		(Papua New Guinea Football Association) Hekari United
10	FW	Boas Tommy		(Papua New Guinea Football Association) PNGFA Academy
19	FW	Alfred Kabavas		(Papua New Guinea Football Association) PNGFA Academy
23	FW	Klivet Ronald		(Papua New Guinea Football Association) Hekari United

=== Samoa ===
The final squad was announced on 7 July 2026.

Head coach: (Spain) Michael Martínez

No.	Pos.	Player	Date of birth (age)	Club
1	GK	Moemanatu Lesatele		(Football Federation Samoa) Lupe o le Soaga
13	GK	Edmardomdes Sione Manase		(Football Federation Samoa) Vaivase-Tai
18	GK	Salu Epati		(Football Federation Samoa) Kiwi
2	DF	Vaea Luteru		(Football Federation Samoa) Vaivase-Tai
3	DF	Malcom Lober		(Football Federation Samoa) Kiwi
4	DF	Bevan Kapisi	7 January 2010 (aged 16)	(New Zealand Football) Uni-Mount Bohemian
5	DF	Sapati Lina Seti		(Football Federation Samoa) Lupe o le Soaga
14	DF	Tuimareko Edward		(Football Federation Samoa) Kiwi
17	DF	Siaki Toomata		(Football Federation Samoa) Vaivase-Tai
6	MF	Atapana Fatu Fasi		(Football Federation Samoa) Vaivase-Tai
7	MF	Eti Matau		(Football Federation Samoa) Lupe o le Soaga
8	MF	Jacum Seilala		(Football Federation Samoa) Kiwi
11	MF	Eliahs Hazelman Siona		(Football Federation Samoa) Vaivase-Tai
15	MF	Tuionoula Iamafana		(Football Federation Samoa) Lupe o le Soaga
9	FW	Mason Aiono		(Football Federation Samoa) Kiwi
10	FW	Te Koha Gabriel Schick		(New Zealand Football) Tauranga Moana
12	FW	Christiano Tamasese		(Football Federation Samoa) Vaivase-Tai
16	FW	Michael Tualatamalelagi		(Football Federation Samoa) Lupe o le Soaga

== Group B ==
=== New Zealand ===
The final squad was announced on 2 July 2026.

Head coach: (England) Martin Bullock

No.	Pos.	Player	Date of birth (age)	Club
1	GK	Zane Donaghy		(The Football Association) Bristol Rovers
12	GK	William Martin		(Football Australia) Lions
2	DF	Jackson Skinner		(Football Australia) Brisbane City
3	DF	Jacob Rowe		(The Football Association) Leyton Orient
4	DF	Rylan Kumar		(New Zealand Football) Auckland United
5	DF	Keigo Shimokawa		(Football Australia) Melbourne Victory
13	DF	Ethan Amyes		(New Zealand Football) Wellington Phoenix
18	DF	London Ridge		(New Zealand Football) Wellington Phoenix
6	MF	Luke Carter		(New Zealand Football) Western Springs
7	MF	Tristan Bancroft		(New Zealand Football) Wellington Phoenix
8	MF	Vasilios Kastrinakis		(New Zealand Football) Wellington Phoenix
10	MF	Davi Valle dos Santos		(Football Australia) Macarthur Bulls
11	MF	Ben Trenberth	8 June 2010 (aged 16)	(New Zealand Football) Wellington Phoenix
14	MF	Jack Clegg		(New Zealand Football) Wellington Phoenix
15	MF	Reuben Lee Sang		(New Zealand Football) Auckland United
16	MF	Caleb Brown		(New Zealand Football) Wellington Phoenix
9	FW	Zach Cashmore		(New Zealand Football) Wellington Phoenix
17	FW	Jesus Santiago Castillo		(New Zealand Football) Melville United
19	FW	Cruz Pietersen		(New Zealand Football) Wellington Phoenix
20	FW	Daniel Anstiss		(New Zealand Football) Auckland United
21	FW	Preston Fava		(Football Australia) Queensland Football

=== Solomon Islands ===
The final squad was announced on 7 July 2026.

Head coach: Henry Fa'arodo

No.	Pos.	Player	Date of birth (age)	Club
1	GK	Eddie Aefi		(Solomon Islands Football Federation) SIFF Academy
12	GK	Sam Suumani		(Solomon Islands Football Federation) SIFF Academy
20	GK	Alick Feroy		(Solomon Islands Football Federation) SIFF Academy
2	DF	Aaron Lulu		(Solomon Islands Football Federation) SIFF Academy
3	DF	Willie Soka		(Solomon Islands Football Federation) SIFF Academy
4	DF	Vaulton Tome		(Solomon Islands Football Federation) SIFF Academy
5	DF	Frank Tumuli		(Solomon Islands Football Federation) SIFF Academy
13	DF	Akay Wickham		(Solomon Islands Football Federation) SIFF Academy
16	DF	Edward Waleilia		(Solomon Islands Football Federation) SIFF Academy
19	DF	Simon Kingmele		(Solomon Islands Football Federation) SIFF Academy
22	DF	Devine Beta		(Solomon Islands Football Federation) SIFF Academy
6	MF	Walcott Kona		(Solomon Islands Football Federation) SIFF Academy
8	MF	Prince Talota		(Solomon Islands Football Federation) SIFF Academy
10	MF	Gregy Gau		(Solomon Islands Football Federation) SIFF Academy
15	MF	William Dederi		(Solomon Islands Football Federation) SIFF Academy
17	MF	Adrian Kabolo		(Solomon Islands Football Federation) SIFF Academy
18	MF	Mathew Sisa		(Solomon Islands Football Federation) SIFF Academy
7	FW	George Lea'i		(Solomon Islands Football Federation) SIFF Academy
9	FW	Jayer Makarani		(Solomon Islands Football Federation) SIFF Academy
11	FW	Ishmael Warren		(Solomon Islands Football Federation) SIFF Academy
14	FW	Johnson Sunga		(Solomon Islands Football Federation) SIFF Academy
21	FW	Barry Waletofea		(Solomon Islands Football Federation) SIFF Academy
23	FW	Lanisi Unusu		(Solomon Islands Football Federation) SIFF Academy

=== Tahiti ===
The final squad was announced on 9 July 2026.

Head coach: Sébastien Labayen

No.	Pos.	Player	Date of birth (age)	Club
1	GK	Tuanui Manea		(Tahitian Football Federation) Dragon
16	GK	Tuahaki Lucas		(Tahitian Football Federation) Tefana
23	GK	Herehau Reichart		(Tahitian Football Federation) Vénus
2	DF	Steevy Peckett		(Tahitian Football Federation) Tefana
3	DF	Manatea Ahupu		(Tahitian Football Federation) Tefana
4	DF	Louka Rode		(Tahitian Football Federation) Dragon
5	DF	Adrien Vorbe		(Tahitian Football Federation) Pirae
14	DF	Thomas Pita-Bougues		(Tahitian Football Federation) Vénus
17	DF	Tamaterai Rima		(Tahitian Football Federation) Dragon
6	MF	Manoa Hiro		(Tahitian Football Federation) Tefana
7	MF	Raimiti Teriitahi		(Tahitian Football Federation) Pirae
8	MF	Akahi Paoa		(Tahitian Football Federation) Vénus
11	MF	Manavai Dordillon		(Tahitian Football Federation) Tefana
15	MF	Heiʻiki Perry		(Tahitian Football Federation) Dragon
20	MF	Hyrum Jones		(Tahitian Football Federation) Dragon
22	MF	Manihini Chane		(Tahitian Football Federation) Pirae
9	FW	Keoni Clark		(Tahitian Football Federation) Pirae
10	FW	Esdras Jamet		(Tahitian Football Federation) Tefana
12	FW	Raitua Tehio		(Tahitian Football Federation) Vénus
18	FW	Santiago Covic		(Tahitian Football Federation) Tefana

=== Vanuatu ===
The final squad was announced on 2 July 2026.

Head coach: Stanley Iata

No.	Pos.	Player	Date of birth (age)	Club
1	GK	Ezekiel Tasso		(Vanuatu Football Federation) Erakor Golden Star
12	GK	Malaki Ryan Roqara		(Vanuatu Football Federation) Ifira Black Bird
21	GK	Victor Peter		(Vanuatu Football Federation) Galaxy FC
2	DF	Matthew Naviti		(Vanuatu Football Federation) Tafea
3	DF	Bruce Bule		(Vanuatu Football Federation) Erakor Golden Star
4	DF	Tony Junior Toro		(Vanuatu Football Federation) Galaxy FC
5	DF	Paul Boe Tahi		(Vanuatu Football Federation) Ifira Black Bird
13	DF	Chimarco Vanuaroro		(Vanuatu Football Federation) Tafea
16	DF	Floyd Naliupis		(Vanuatu Football Federation) Galaxy FC
6	MF	Russel Alaleo		(Vanuatu Football Federation) Ifira Black Bird
7	MF	Brent Kaluat		(Vanuatu Football Federation) Erakor Golden Star
8	MF	Kayne Jimmy Dick		(Vanuatu Football Federation) Tafea
10	MF	Rohan Masauvakalo		(Vanuatu Football Federation) Tupuji Imere
11	MF	Nelson Tawia		(Vanuatu Football Federation) Galaxy FC
14	MF	Semi Korty		(Vanuatu Football Federation) Tafea
15	MF	Claver Paul		(Vanuatu Football Federation) Ifira Black Bird
9	FW	Franso Shem		(Vanuatu Football Federation) Galaxy FC
17	FW	Ettien Vuti		(Vanuatu Football Federation) Erakor Golden Star
18	FW	Ukon Golding David		(Vanuatu Football Federation) Tupuji Imere
19	FW	Titus Robert		(Vanuatu Football Federation) Ifira Black Bird
