= Moata'a FC =

- Ground: Toleafoa J.S Blatter Soccer Stadium
- Capacity: 3,500
- League: Samoa National League
- 2018: 9th
Home colours	Away colours

Moata'a is a Samoan football club based in Apia. It plays in the Samoa National League.

== History ==
The first recorded appearance of Moata'a in the Samoan football league system was when they were promoted to the Premier division at the end of the 1998 season. Following their promotion the previous year, they then won the southern qualifying group for the Championship of Champions in 1999 and then went unbeaten through the final tournament winning all six games played and finishing ahead of Goldstar Sogi in second place and Kiwi in third to win what is to date, their only national championship. That year, they were runners up in the Samoa Cup, losing in the final to Moaula. they were unable to defen their title the following season, finishing in fifth position, two points clear of Vaivase-tai, but one point behind the Samoa U-20 national football team. they also lost in the semi-finals of the cup, 3–1 on penalties to Goldstar Sogi.

It is not known where they finished in 2001, but they finished fourth in 2002, on 14 points, one ahead of Togafuafua, but three behind Kiwi. They finished in the same position the next season, one point ahead of Strickland Brothers Lepea and behind OSM Sinamoga on goal difference.

Their fortunes fell considerably in 2004 when they finished second from bottom, one point above Vaivase-tai, winning only two games in the regular season and entered the relegation playoffs. In the playoffs, where matches consisted of two 35 minute halves with a five-minute break in between, Moata'a performed better than they had in the regular season, winning four of their six games they finished fourth out of the eight teams and retained their place in the top division. This reprieve did not last long however, as they finished last the next season, with only three points. It is not clear whether they were relegated, but there is no concrete evidence of them playing in the top division until the 2009–10 season. This was another poor season, with the team finishing second from bottom after the exclusion of Central United and USP Soccer Club. Only a substantially better goal difference kept them off the bottom and above Strickland Brothers Lepea. Their performance improved slightly in 2010-11 Samoa National League, when they finished seventh, three points clearof Apia Youth but below Goldstar Sogi on goal difference. However, this is the last record to date of them taking part in the National League.

== Honours ==
Samoa National League

- Winner: 1999

Samoa Cup

- Runner-up: 1999
