= 2003 Samoa National League =

Samoa National League
- Season: 2003
- Champions: Strickland Brothers Lepea

The 2003 Samoa National League, or also known as the Upolo First Division, was the 15th edition of the Samoa National League, the top league of the Football Federation Samoa. Strickland Brothers Lepea won their second consecutive title.

== Regular season ==
=== Standings ===
Known results from source:

Pos	Team	Pld	W	D	L	GF	GA	GD	Pts
1	Goldstar Sogi	9	6	3	0	19	3	+16	21
2	Kiwi	9	5	2	2	27	20	+7	17
3	OSM Sinamoga	9	3	5	1	23	11	+12	14
4	Moata'a	9	3	5	1	12	12	0	14
5	Strickland Brothers Lepea	9	3	4	2	15	11	+4	13
6	Vaivase-tai	9	3	4	2	16	13	+3	13
7	Lupe Ole Soaga	9	2	5	2	18	16	+2	11
8	Togafuafua	9	2	4	3	16	18	−2	10
9	Adidas Soccer Club	8	0	2	6	6	26	−20	2
10	Vaipuna	8	0	0	8	3	25	−22	0

== Champion of Champions ==
The 'Champion of Champions' is the knockout competition held after the regular season to decide the league champion.

=== Quarterfinals ===
November 1, 2003

Strickland Brothers Lepea	4-0	Faatoia

November 1, 2003

Sinamoga	3-1	Matautu Youth

November 1, 2003

Goldstar Sogi FC	1-2	Moataa

November 1, 2003

Kiwi	0-0 (p. 3-0)	Moamoa FC

=== Semifinals ===
November 8, 2003

Strickland Brothers Lepea	3-0	Sinamoga

November 8, 2003

Moataa	2-0	Kiwi

=== Final ===
November 15, 2003

Strickland Brothers Lepea	5-2	Moataa

Toleafoa J.S. Blatter Complex
