= Jarvis Vaai =

Samoan footballer (born 2003)

Personal information
- Full name: Jarvis Vaai Filimalae
- Date of birth: 20 April 2003 (age 23)
- Place of birth: Vaiala, Apia, Samoa
- Height: 1.72 m (5 ft 8 in)
- Position: Forward

Team information
- Current team: Nelson Suburbs
- Number: 18

Youth career
- –2019: Kiwi
- 2022: Fluminense Peru

Senior career*
Years	Team	Apps	(Gls)
2020	Lupe o le Soaga		
2020–2021	Havelock North		
2022–2024	Lupe o le Soaga		
2024–	Nelson Suburbs	23	(1)

International career^{‡}
2018	Samoa U16	6	(7)
2019–	Samoa	10	(1)
- * Club domestic league appearances and goals ‡ National team caps and goals as of 8 December 2024

Jarvis Vaai Filimalae (born 20 April 2003), commonly referred to as Jarvis Vaai, is a Samoan professional footballer who plays as a forward for New Zealand Southern League club Nelson Suburbs.

== Club career ==
=== Early career ===
Vaai developed an interest in football at the age of seven, when his father Alastise became a referee with the Football Federation Samoa (FFS) and Vaai would accompany him to games. He was enrolled in a number of footballing projects in Samoa, including Fun Football, where he was chosen to star in a commercial promoting the various programmes run by the FFS.

Having played for Kiwi in his youth, Vaai played for both Samoan club Lupe o le Soaga and New Zealand club Havelock North in the 2020 season. In January 2022, after a good season with Havelock North, he was invited to join a football centre in Peru linked with Brazilian professional side Fluminense.

=== Nelson Suburbs ===
In 2024 he returned to New Zealand, joining Southern League side Nelson Suburbs.

== International career ==
Vaai was called up to the Samoa under-16 squad for the 2018 OFC U-16 Championship, scoring five goals in the qualification round before adding two more in the competition proper.

He was called up to the senior squad for the first time ahead of the 2019 Pacific Games, going on to make his debut at the age of sixteen and providing an assist for Matthew Chant in a 2–0 win against Tonga.

In 2024, following a five-year absence from the team, Vaai was called up to the squad again for the 2024 OFC Men's Nations Cup. Later in the same year, he scored his first goal for the nation in 2026 FIFA World Cup qualification; the second in a 2–0 win against American Samoa.

== Personal life ==
Vaai attended the Hastings Boys' High School in Hastings, New Zealand on a scholarship through an agreement with the FFS.

== Career statistics ==
=== Club ===
As of 6 September 2024.

Appearances and goals by club, season and competition
Club	Season	League			Cup		Continental		Other		Total	
Club	Season	Division	Apps	Goals	Apps	Goals	Apps	Goals	Apps	Goals	Apps	Goals
Lupe o le Soaga	2020	Samoa National League	–		–		5 (Note: Appearances in the OFC Champions League)	0	–		5	0
Nelson Suburbs	2024	Southern League	6	0	–		–		0	0	6	0
Nelson Suburbs	2025	Southern League	17	1	3 (Note: Appearances in the Chatham Cup)	0	–		0	0	20	1
Nelson Suburbs	Total		23	1	3	0	0	0	0	0	26	1
Career total			23	1	3	0	5	0	0	0	31	1

=== International ===
As of 8 December 2024

National team	Year	Apps	Goals
Samoa	2019	2	0
Samoa	2024	8	1
Total		10	1

=== International goals ===
Scores and results list Samoa's goal tally first, score column indicates score after each Samoa goal.

List of international goals scored by Vaai
No.	Date	Venue	Opponent	Score	Result	Competition
1	6 September 2024	FFS Football Stadium Field 1, Apia, Samoa	American Samoa	2–0	2–0	2026 FIFA World Cup qualification
