= Kenneth Kerewi =

Nigerian footballer

Personal information
- Date of birth: 8 May 1982 (age 44)
- Place of birth: Nigeria
- Position: Midfielder

Team information
- Current team: Pago Youth
- Number: 8

Senior career*
Years	Team	Apps	(Gls)
2013	Thimphu City		
2014	Druk Stars		
2016	Kiwi FC		
2017	Utulei Youth		
2018	Kiwi FC		
2019	Manurewa AFC		
2020	Lupe o le Soaga		
2021	Vaipuna SC		
2026–	Pago Youth		
- * Club domestic league appearances and goals

Kenneth Kerewi (born 8 May 1982) is a Nigerian professional footballer who plays as a midfielder for Pago Youth. Besides playing in Nigeria, he has also played in Bhutan, Samoa, American Samoa and New Zealand.

== Career ==
Before the 2016 season, Kerewi signed with Samoan side Kiwi FC. Ahead of the 2017 season, he joined Utulei Youth in American Samoa. In 2018, he returned to Kiwi FC. Midway through the 2019 season, he signed with New Zealand's Manurewa AFC. In 2020, he joined the Samoan top flight club Lupe o le Soaga. The following season, he signed with another Samoan top flight club, Vaipuna SC, in Samoa. Kerewi has won the Samoa National League four times: with Kiwi FC in 2018, with Lupe o le Soaga in 2020 and Vaipuna SC in 2023 and 2025, making him the first foreign player to achieve this feat with three different clubs. In January 2026, he signed with American Samoa side Pago Youth.

There, his fans gave him a nickname: Johann Sebastian Bach because one day he played the piano.
