= Faalavelave Matagi =

Samoan footballer (born 1997)

Faalavelvae Matagi
Personal information
- Full name: Faalavelvae Matagi
- Date of birth: March 13, 1997 (age 29)
- Place of birth: Apia, Samoa
- Height: 1.75 m (5 ft 9 in)
- Position: Goalkeeper

Team information
- Current team: Lupe ole Soaga

Senior career*
Years	Team	Apps	(Gls)
2013–2016	Vaitele Uta		
2016	Vailima Kiwi		
2016	Vaitele Uta		
2016–	Lupe ole Soaga		

International career^{‡}
2013	Samoa U17	0	(0)
2016–	Samoa U20	1	(0)
2016–	Samoa	7	(0)
- * Club domestic league appearances and goals ‡ National team caps and goals as of 18 July 2019

Faalavelvae Matagi (born 13 March 1997) is a Samoan footballer who plays as a goalkeeper for Lupe ole Soaga in the Samoa National League and the Samoa national football team.

Matagi grew up playing rugby, but switched to soccer at the age of 15 when his school team needed a goalkeeper. He was selected for the Samoa national football team for the 2016 OFC Nations Cup. He captained the Samoa national under-20 football team in the 2016 OFC U-20 Championship. In June 2019 he was named to the squad for the 2019 Pacific Games.

In 2017 he was part of the Lupe o le Soaga team contesting the 2017 OFC Champions League.

He works as the Goalkeeping Development Officer for Football Federation Samoa.
