= 2000 Samoa National League =

Samoa National League
- Season: 2000
- Champions: Titavi FC

The 2000 Samoa National League, or also known as the Upolo First Division, was the 12th edition of the Samoa National League, the top league of the Football Federation Samoa. Titavi FC won their first title.

== Standings ==
Known results from source:

Pos	Team	Pld	W	D	L	GF	GA	GD	Pts
1	Titavi	9	9	0	0	39	2	+37	19
2	Goldstar Sogi	–	–	–	–	–	–	—	16
3	Under-20s	10	7	1	2	–	–	—	16
4	Moamoa	11	6	2	3	–	–	—	14
5	Moata'a	–	–	–	–	–	–	—	13
6	Vaitoloa	–	–	–	–	–	–	—	12
7	Faatoia	–	–	–	–	–	–	—	10
8	Vaivase-tai	11	4	2	5	–	–	—	10
9	Vaipuna	–	–	–	–	–	–	—	10
10	Kiwi	–	–	–	–	–	–	—	8
11	Vaiala	–	–	–	–	–	–	—	6
12	Togafuafua	–	–	–	–	–	–	—	2

Source: rsssf.com
