= 2013 Samoa Cup =

- Season: 2013
- Champions: (Samoa) Lupe o le Soaga

The 2013 Samoa Cup was the third edition of the Samoa Cup, a domestic cup played by the teams of the year's Samoa National League participants. This cup was won by Lupe o le Soaga for the first time, winning over runners-up Kiwi FC 2–1 in the overall final.
