= 2005 Samoa National League =

Samoa National League
- Season: 2005
- Champions: Tuanaimoto Breeze

The 2005 Samoa National League, or also known as the Upolo First Division, was the 17th edition of the Samoa National League, the top league of the Football Federation Samoa. Tuanaimoto Breeze won their fourth consecutive title, the first under their new name (original name was Strickland Brothers Lepea).

== Teams ==
- Tuanaimoto Breeze
- Lupe Ole Soaga
- Goldstar Sogi
- Kiwi
- AST Central United
- Moamoa
- Faatoia
- OSM Sinamoga
- Moata'a
- Vaivase-tai
