= 2002 Samoa National League =

Samoa National League
- Season: 2002
- Champions: Strickland Brothers Lepea

The 2002 Samoa National League, or also known as the Upolo First Division, was the 14th edition of the Samoa National League, the top league of the Football Federation Samoa. Strickland Brothers Lepea won their first title.

== Standings ==
Known results from source:

Pos	Team	Pld	W	D	L	GF	GA	GD	Pts
1	Strickland Brothers Lepea	9	8	1	0	37	7	+30	17
2	Goldstar Sogi	9	7	1	1	34	9	+25	15
3	Kiwi	9	-	-	-	-	-	—	14
4	Moata'a	9	-	-	-	-	-	—	11
5	Togafuafua	9	-	-	-	-	-	—	10
6	Adidas Soccer Club	9	-	-	-	-	-	—	8
7	OSM Sinamoga	9	-	-	-	-	-	—	7
8	Maagao	9	-	-	-	-	-	—	4
9	Moamoa	9	1	2	6	-	-	—	4
10	Vaivase-tai	9	0	0	9	-	-	—	0

== Top scorers ==
Pos	Player	Team	Goals
1	(Samoa) Desmond Fa'aiuaso	Strickland Brothers Lepea	21
2	(Samoa) Ben Timo	Goldstar Sogi	17
3	(Samoa) Junior Reid	Kiwi	13
4	(Samoa) Opele Lui	Moata'a	11
