= Cruz Azul (Samoa) =

Association football club in Samoa

- Ground: Toleafoa J.S Blatter Soccer Stadium
- League: Samoa National League
- 2009–10: 2nd
Home colours	Away colours	Third colours

Cruz Azul (also spelled Gruz Azull) was a Samoan football club. It played in the Samoa National League.

== History ==
The first known appearance of Cruz Azul in the Samoan football league system was in 2006 when they lost to Vaivase-tai in the Champion of Champions final. They went one better the following season, registering their first, and to date only, national championship, when they beat Strickland Brothers Lepea 1–0 in the 2007 Champion of Champions final. It is not known where they finished in 2008, but they did not defend their title as OSM Sinamoga defeated Lupe ole Soaga in the Champion of Champions final. They were runners up to Moaula United the following season, finishing five points behind the eventual champions and three points ahead of Kiwi in third place, winning 16 and drawing two of their 20 games. They appear not to have taken part in either the Premier Division or the first division the next season, nor is there any record of them competing in the national league again to date.

== Honours ==
Samoa National League

- Winner: 2007
- Runner up: 2006, 2009–10
