= 2025 OFC Men's Champions League final =

Football match in Honiara, Solomon Islands

- Event: 2025 OFC Men's Champions League
Auckland City	Hekari United
(New Zealand)	(Papua New Guinea)
2	0
- Date: 12 April 2025
- Venue: National Stadium, Honiara
- Man of the Match: Myer Bevan (Auckland City)
- Referee: Facundo Tello (Argentina)
- Attendance: 6,000

The 2025 OFC Men's Champions League final was the final match of the 2025 OFC Men's Champions League, the 24th edition of the Oceanian Club Championship, Oceania's premier club football tournament organized by the Oceania Football Confederation (OFC), and the 19th season under the current OFC Men's Champions League name.

The final was a single match between New Zealand's Auckland City and Papua New Guinea's Hekari United. The match took place at the National Stadium in Honiara on 12 April 2025. It was the first time since 2013 that an OFC Champions League final was contested between two former champions.

Auckland City won the match 2-0 for a record-extending 13th title.

== Teams ==
In the following table, finals until 2006 were in the Oceania Club Championship era, since 2007 were in the OFC Champions League era.

Team	Previous finals appearances (bold indicates winners)
(New Zealand) Auckland City	12 (**2006**, **2009**, **2011**, **2012**, **2013**, **2014**, **2015**, **2016**, **2017**, **2022**, **2023**, **2024**)
(Papua New Guinea) Hekari United	1 (**2010**)

== Venue ==
The National Stadium was the venue for the final. This was the first time that the stadium hosted an OFC Men's Champions League final.

== Road to the final ==
Note: In all results below, the score of the finalist is given first (H: home; A: away; N: neutral).

(New Zealand) Auckland City		Round	(Papua New Guinea) Hekari United	
Opponent	Result	Group stage	Opponent	Result
(French Polynesia) Pirae	1–0	Matchday 1	(Solomon Islands) Central Coast	3–0
(New Caledonia) Tiga Sport	2–0	Matchday 2	(Vanuatu) Ifira Black Bird	1–1
(Fiji) Rewa	1–1	Matchday 3	(Cook Islands) Tupapa Maraerenga	9–0
**Group A winners**: Pos / Team / Pld / Pts; **1** / (New Zealand) Auckland City / **3** / **7**; 2 / (New Caledonia) Tiga Sport / 3 / **4**; 3 / (French Polynesia) Pirae / 3 / **4**; 4 / (Fiji) Rewa / 3 / **1**; Source: OFC		Final standings	**Group B winners**: Pos / Team / Pld / Pts; **1** / (Papua New Guinea) Hekari United / **3** / **7**; 2 / (Vanuatu) Ifira Black Bird / 3 / **5**; 3 / (Solomon Islands) Central Coast (H) / 3 / **4**; 4 / (Cook Islands) Tupapa Maraerenga / 3 / **0**; Source: OFC (H) Hosts	
Opponent	Result	Knockout stage	Opponent	Result
(Vanuatu) Ifira Black Bird	2–0	Semi-finals	(New Caledonia) Tiga Sport	1–0

== Format ==
If the match is level at the end of 90 minutes of normal playing time, extra time will be played (two periods of 15 minutes each), where each team would be allowed to make a fourth substitution. If still tied after extra time, the match will be decided by a penalty shoot-out to determine the winners.

== Match ==
=== Details ===
12 April 2025
18:00 UTC+11

Auckland City (New Zealand)	2−0	(Papua New Guinea) Hekari United
Bevan 39', 83' (pen.)	Report

National Stadium, Honiara
Attendance: 6,000
Referee: Facundo Tello (Argentina)

**Auckland City**	**Hekari United**

GK	1	(New Zealand) Conor Tracey
RB	17	(Colombia) Jerson Lagos
CB	3	(New Zealand) Adam Mitchell (c)
CB	4	(New Zealand) Nikko Boxall
LB	13	(New Zealand) Nathan Lobo
CM	26	(New Zealand) David Yoo		(substituted off) 88'
CM	25	(New Zealand) Michael den Heijer	(yellow card) 90+1'
CM	8	(Spain) Gerard Garriga		(substituted off) 80'
RW	10	(New Zealand) Dylan Manickum		(substituted off) 80'
CF	7	(New Zealand) Myer Bevan
LW	27	(New Zealand) Haris Zeb	(yellow card) 51'	(substituted off) 74'
Substitutes:
GK	24	(New Zealand) Nathan Garrow
DF	4	(New Zealand) Christian Gray		(substituted on) 88'
DF	22	(China) Zhou Tong
DF	14	(New Zealand) Jordan Vale		(substituted on) 80'
DF	19	(Republic of Ireland) Dylan Connolly
DF	30	(New Zealand) Adam Bell
MF	20	(New Zealand) Matt Ellis		(substituted on) 74'
FW	11	(New Zealand) Ryan de Vries		(substituted on) 80'
FW	28	(New Zealand) Otto Ingham
Manager:
(New Zealand) Paul Posa

GK	1	(Papua New Guinea) Dave Tomare (c)
RB	3	(Papua New Guinea) Godfrey Haro
CB	4	(Brazil) Erick Joe	(yellow card) 6'
CB	6	(Papua New Guinea) Solomon Rani
LB	7	(Papua New Guinea) Joseph Joe		(substituted off) 86'
CM	9	(Papua New Guinea) Ati Kepo	(yellow card) 13'	(substituted off) 69'
CM	10	(Papua New Guinea) Kolu Kepo
CAM	11	(Papua New Guinea) Pala Paul
RW	26	(Brazil) Lucas Santos
CF	27	(Papua New Guinea) Rex Naime
LW	34	(Papua New Guinea) Nelson Karaun
Substitutes:
GK	20	(Papua New Guinea) Christinus Biasu
DF	5	(Papua New Guinea) Moses Joe
DF	17	(Papua New Guinea) Nathaniel Eddie
DF	29	(Papua New Guinea) Ismael Kila
MF	15	(Papua New Guinea) Donald Panile
MF	16	(Papua New Guinea) Nathan James
MF	21	(Papua New Guinea) Kule Leslie		(substituted on) 86'
MF	25	(Papua New Guinea) Gogi Wally
MF	32	(Papua New Guinea) Ritzoki Tamgol	(yellow card) 72'	(substituted on) 69'
MF	37	(Papua New Guinea) Jericho Som
FW	13	(Papua New Guinea) Peter Dabinyaba
FW	31	(Papua New Guinea) Creonie Walo
Manager:
(Solomon Islands) Jerry Allen

Man of the Match:
Myer Bevan (Auckland City)

Assistant referees:
Juan Pablo Belatti (Argentina)
Folio Moeaki (Tonga)
Fourth official:
Norbert Hauata (Tahiti)
Fifth official:
Bertrand Brial (New Caledonia)

**Match rules**

- 90 minutes.
- 30 minutes of extra time if scores level.
- Penalty shoot-out if scores still level.
- Maximum of three substitutions, with a fourth allowed in extra time.
