= 2012–13 Samoa National League =

Samoa National League
- Season: 2012–13
- Champions: (Samoa) Lupe o le Soaga
- Matches: 132
- Goals: 638 (4.83 per match)

The 2012–13 Samoa National League was the 23rd edition of the Samoa National League, the top league of the Football Federation Samoa. This season was won by Lupe o le Soaga for the first recorded time.

== Standings ==
Team	Pld	W	D	L	GF	GA	GD	Pts	Qualification or relegation
Lupe ole Soaga (C)	22	19	2	1	63	16	+47	59	Qualified for the 2013–14 OFC Champions League
Moaula United	22	18	2	2	149	48	+101	56	
Kiwi	22	14	3	5	80	36	+44	45	
One Way Wind	22	11	4	7	55	37	+18	37	
Adidas Soccer Club	22	11	4	7	66	48	+18	37	
Vaimoso	22	10	5	7	62	38	+24	35	
Apia Youth	22	11	1	10	40	54	−14	34	
Central United	22	6	2	14	32	68	−36	20	
Vaivase-tai	22	5	3	14	19	59	−40	18	
Strickland Brothers Lepea	22	5	2	15	40	71	−31	17	
Goldstar Sogi	22	5	2	15	32	86	−54	17	Relegated to the 2013-14 Samoa First Division

(C) Champions
