= 1984 Samoa National League =

Samoa National League
- Season: 1984
- Champions: Kiwi
- Promoted: Marist, Togafuafua
- Relegated: FOPA, YFC
- Matches played: 121
- Goals scored: 139 (1.15 per match)

The 1984 Samoa National League, or also known as the Upolo First Division, was the 6th edition of the Samoa National League, the top league of the Football Federation Samoa. Kiwi F.C. won their first title, eventually becoming the first in a three title streak.

FOPA and YFC were both relegated to the 1985 Samoa Division 2.

== Standings ==
| Pos | Team | Pld | W | D | L | GF | GA | GD | Pts | Qualification or relegation |
|---|---|---|---|---|---|---|---|---|---|---|
| 1 | Kiwi (C) | 11 | 8 | 2 | 1 | 21 | 10 | +11 | 18 | |
| 2 | Lotopa | 11 | 7 | 2 | 2 | 15 | 7 | +8 | 16 | |
| 3 | Vaivase-tai | 11 | 7 | 1 | 3 | 17 | 8 | +9 | 15 | |
| 4 | Faatoia | 11 | 4 | 4 | 3 | 13 | 9 | +4 | 12 | |
| 5 | Vaivase-uta | 11 | 3 | 6 | 2 | 11 | 7 | +4 | 12 | |
| 6 | Vaipuna | 11 | 5 | 1 | 5 | 14 | 11 | +3 | 11 | |
| 7 | Moamoatai | 11 | 4 | 2 | 5 | 13 | 10 | +3 | 10 | |
| 8 | SCOPA | 11 | 4 | 2 | 5 | 14 | 12 | +2 | 10 | |
| 9 | Laiovaea | 11 | 4 | 1 | 6 | 11 | 16 | −5 | 9 | |
| 10 | Alafua | 11 | 4 | 0 | 7 | 12 | 16 | −4 | 8 | |
| 11 | FOPA (R) | 11 | 2 | 3 | 6 | 6 | 20 | −14 | 7 | Relegated to 1985 Samoa Division 2 |
| 12 | YFC (R) | 11 | 0 | 2 | 9 | 6 | 22 | −16 | 2 | Relegated to 1985 Samoa Division 2 |

Updated to match(es) played on end of season. Source:
Rules for classification: 1) points; 2) goal difference; 3) number of goals scored.
(C) Champions; (R) Relegated

=== Promotion / relegation playoffs ===
| Pos | Team | Pld | W | D | L | Pts | Promotion or relegation |
|---|---|---|---|---|---|---|---|
| 1 | Marist (P) | 3 | 3 | 0 | 0 | 6 | Promoted to 1985 Samoa National League |
| 2 | Togafuafua (P) | 3 | 2 | 0 | 1 | 4 | Promoted to 1985 Samoa National League |
| 3 | FOPA (R) | 3 | 1 | 0 | 2 | 2 | Relegated to second division |
| 4 | YFC (R) | 3 | 0 | 0 | 3 | 0 | Relegated to second division |

Updated to match(es) played on end of season. Source:
Rules for classification: 1) points; 2) goal difference; 3) number of goals scored.
(P) Promoted; (R) Relegated
