= 2010 Samoa Cup =

- Season: 2010
- Champions: (Samoa) Kiwi FC
- Matches played: 34
- Goals scored: 154 (4.53 per match)

The 2010 Samoa Cup was the first edition of the Samoa Cup, a domestic cup played by the teams of the year's Samoa National League participants. This cup was won by Kiwi FC for the first time, winning over runners-up Moaula FC 3–1 in the overall final.
