= Cruz Azul (disambiguation) =

Cruz Azul is a professional association football club based in Mexico City, Mexico.

Cruz Azul may also refer to:

- Ciudad Cooperativa Cruz Azul, an industrial city located in Hidalgo, Mexico.
- Cooperativa La Cruz Azul, an industrial company.
  - Cemento Cruz Azul, a cement brand.
- Cruz Azul Femenil, the women's division of the football club based in Cuernavaca, Morelos.
- Cruz Azul Hidalgo, a Mexican professional football club and an affiliate of Cruz Azul, based in Ciudad Cooperativa Cruz Azul (formerly known as Jasso), Hidalgo. The club competes in Liga de Expansión MX.
- Cruz Azul Lagunas, a Mexican professional football club and an affiliate of Cruz Azul, based in Lagunas, Oaxaca. The club competes in Premier B, the bottom branch of Liga Premier de México.
- Cruz Azul Oaxaca, a former Mexican football club affiliated with Cruz Azul that competed in the Primera División "A".
- Cruz Azul Jasso, a former Mexican football club affiliated with Cruz Azul that competed in the Segunda División and Tecera División de México.
- Cruz Azul Premier, a former Mexican football club affiliated with Cruz Azul that competed in the Liga Premier.
- Cruz Azul Reserves and Academy, Cruz Azul's under-15, under-17, under-19 and under-21 teams.
- C.D. Cruz Azul, a Honduran professional football club based in San José de Colinas.
- Cruz Azul (Samoa), a Samoan football club.
- Cruz Azul Mexicana, a Mexican-American organization.
