= 1997 Samoa National League =

Samoa National League
- Season: 1997
- Champions: Kiwi FC

The 1997 Samoa National League, or also known as the Upolo First Division, was the 8th edition of the Samoa National League, the top league of the Football Federation Samoa. Kiwi F.C. won their third title, completing a three title streak.
