= Silao Malo =

Samoan footballer

Personal information
- Full name: Silao Malo
- Date of birth: 30 December 1990 (age 35)
- Place of birth: Samoa
- Position: Midfielder

Team information
- Current team: Vaimoso

Senior career*
Years	Team	Apps	(Gls)
–2013	Vailima Kiwi		
2013–2016	Lupe o le Soaga		
2016	Vaimoso		
2016	Kiwi FC		
2016–	Vaimoso		

International career^{‡}
2011–	Samoa	11	(2)
- * Club domestic league appearances and goals as of 1 June 2016 ‡ National team caps and goals as of 12 June 2016

Silao Malo (born 30 December 1990, in Samoa) is a footballer who plays as a midfielder for Vaimoso and Samoa.

== International career ==
On 26 November 2011, Malo scored the winning goal against American Samoa that qualified Samoa to OFC Nations Cup for the first time. Malo also scored the only Samoan goal at 2012 OFC Nations Cup in a 10–1 loss against Tahiti at their debut. In the following match, against Vanuatu, he was fouled inside the penalty box, but Andrew Setefano failed to score from the penalty spot.

He was selected for the Samoan team for the 2016 OFC nations cup.

== Career statistics ==
=== International goals ===
#	Date	Venue	Opponent	Score	Result	Competition
1	26 November 2011	Toleafoa J. S. Blatter Soccer Stadium, Apia	American Samoa	1-0	1-0	2014 FIFA World Cup qualification
2	1 June 2012	Lawson Tama Stadium, Honiara	Tahiti	1-6	1-10	2012 OFC Nations Cup
