= 1999 Samoa National League =

Samoa National League
- Season: 1999
- Champions: Moata'a

The 1999 Samoa National League, or also known as the Upolo First Division, was the 11th edition of the Samoa National League, the top league of the Football Federation Samoa. Moata'a FC won their first title.

== Teams ==
Each team participated in a qualifying tournament where the top four finishers in each Group North & Group South qualified for the league. The teams then participated in the normal league round-robin.

Group North

- Vaitoloa – winner
- Moamoa – runner-up
- Vaiala
- Kiwi

Group South

- Moata'a – winner
- Goldstar Sogi – runner-up
- Togafuafua
- Vaipuna

== Standings ==
Pos	Team	Pld	W	D	L	Pts
1	Moata'a	6	6	0	0	12
2	Goldstar Sogi	7	4	2	1	10
3	Kiwi	6	3	3	0	9
4	Togafuafua	7	2	2	3	6
5	Vaitoloa	7	2	1	4	5
6	Vaipuna	6	1	2	3	4
7	Moamoa	7	2	0	5	4
8	Vaiala	6	1	0	5	2
