= Lionel Taylor (footballer) =

Samoan footballer (born 1984)

Personal information
- Full name: Joseph Lionel Taylor
- Date of birth: 22 January 1984 (age 42)
- Place of birth: Samoa
- Position: Midfielder

Team information
- Current team: Vailima Kiwi FC

Senior career*
Years	Team	Apps	(Gls)
2004–	Vailima Kiwi FC	410	

International career^{‡}
2007–	Samoa	14	(1)
- * Club domestic league appearances and goals as of 29 June 2016 ‡ National team caps and goals as of 29 June 2016

Joseph Lionel Taylor (born 22 January 1984) is a Samoan footballer who plays as a midfielder for Vailima Kiwi FC in the Samoa National League.

== Career ==
He played for Lupe o le Soaga in the 2014–15 OFC Champions League.

In the 2016 OFC Champions League, he was one of six players red-carded during Vailima Kiwi's match with Nadi F.C. He was selected for the Samoan team for the 2016 OFC nations cup.
