= Benson Hunt =

Samoan international footballer (born 1990)

Personal information
- Full name: Benson Hunt
- Date of birth: 18 January 1990 (age 36)
- Place of birth: Samoa
- Position: Forward

Team information
- Current team: Vailima Kiwi

Senior career*
Years	Team	Apps	(Gls)
2010–2015	Vaitoloa		
2016–	Vailima Kiwi		

International career^{‡}
2015	Samoa	2	(0)
- * Club domestic league appearances and goals ‡ National team caps and goals as of 2 September 2015

Benson Hunt is a Samoan international footballer who plays as a forward for Vailima Kiwi. He made his debut for the Samoa national team on 31 August 2015 in a 3–2 victory against American Samoa during 2018 World Cup qualification.

Hunt was the top scorer and most valuable player of the 2013–14 Samoa National League while playing with Vaitoloa. He was in the Vailima Kiwi squad that took part in the 2016 OFC Champions League and was an unused substitute twice in the preliminary stage.
