= 2014 Samoa Cup =

- Season: 2014
- Champions: (Samoa) Kiwi FC

The 2014 Samoa Cup was the fourth edition of the Samoa Cup, a domestic cup played by the teams of the year's Samoa National League participants. This cup was won by Kiwi FC for the second time.
