= 2025 OFC Men's Champions League qualifying stage =

The 2025 OFC Men's Champions League qualifying stage was played from 8 to 14 February 2025. A total of three teams competed in the qualifying stage to decide the last of the 8 places in the group stage of the 2025 OFC Men's Champions League. This qualifying tournament was the first time an all-female officiating team officiated an OFC men's competition.

== Preliminary group ==
=== Draw ===
The draw was held on 11 December 2024 at OFC Headquarters in Auckland. For this edition, no team from Tonga was present in the draw.

| Host team | Remaining teams |
|---|---|
| (Cook Islands) Tupapa Maraerenga | (American Samoa) Royal Puma; (Samoa) Vaipuna |

=== Format ===
The three teams in the qualifying stage played each other on a round-robin basis at a centralised venue in Cook Islands. The winners advanced to the group stage to join Rewa, Tiga Sport, Auckland City and the four winners from the national playoffs.

=== Matches ===
| Pos | Team | Pld | W | D | L | GF | GA | GD | Pts | Qualification | TUP | VAI | RPU |
|---|---|---|---|---|---|---|---|---|---|---|---|---|---|
| 1 | (Cook Islands) Tupapa Maraerenga (H) | 2 | 1 | 1 | 0 | 5 | 4 | +1 | 4 | Advance to group stage | — | — | — |
| 2 | (Samoa) Vaipuna | 2 | 1 | 0 | 1 | 5 | 2 | +3 | 3 | | 1–2 | — | — |
| 3 | (American Samoa) Royal Puma | 2 | 0 | 1 | 1 | 3 | 7 | −4 | 1 | | 3–3 | 0–4 | — |

Source: OFC
(H) Hosts
8 February 2025
15:00

| Royal Puma (American Samoa) | 0–4 | (Samoa) Vaipuna |
|---|---|---|
| | Report | Faafoi 15', 25'; Viliamu 45+1'; Lesatele 63' |

CIFA Academy, Matavera
Attendance: 200
Referee: Sarah Jones (New Zealand)
11 February 2025
15:00

| Royal Puma (American Samoa) | 3–3 | (Cook Islands) Tupapa Maraerenga |
|---|---|---|
| Collins 26', 37'; Fe'a 84' | Report | Harmon 14'; Matapo 29', 45+3' (pen.) |

CIFA Academy, Matavera
Attendance: 200
Referee: Shama Maemae (Solomon Islands)
14 February 2025
15:00

| Vaipuna (Samoa) | 1–2 | (Cook Islands) Tupapa Maraerenga |
|---|---|---|
| Lesatele 9' | Report | McCoy 27', 45+3' |

CIFA Academy, Matavera
Attendance: 200
Referee: Torika Delai (Fiji)
