= 2011 Samoa Cup =

- Season: 2011
- Champions: (Samoa) Moaula FC

The 2011 Samoa Cup was the second edition of the Samoa Cup, a domestic cup played by the teams of the year's Samoa National League participants. This cup was won by Moaula FC for the first time, winning over runners-up Kiwi FC 5-2 in the overall final.
