= Adidas SC =

Association football club in Samoa

- Full name: All Day I Dream About Soccer Club
- Ground: Toleafoa J.S Blatter Soccer Stadium
- League: Samoa National League
- 2018: 11th
Home colours	Away colours

Adidas Soccer Club is a Samoan association football club based in Almagoto. It currently plays in the Samoa National League. The club also runs a women's team.

== History ==
Adidas's first recorded season in the Samoa National league was in 2002, where they finished sixth out of ten teams, one place above the relegation play-offs. The following season, they finished bottom of the league in the regular season, winning only one game and entered the relegation playoffs. They won only one more game in the relegation playoffs between the top four teams from the second division and the bottom four from the national league and appear to have been relegated as they did not partake in the 2004 season, nor were they involved in the playoffs for promotion

Although not documented, it is assumed at some point during either the 2005 or 2006 seasons, they were promoted as they participated in the 2007 Samoa National League. Although their final league position for the season is not known, they recorded at least one victory (over Strickland Brothers Lepea, the eventual runners up), suffered one loss, against Cruz Azul, the eventual winners of the league. and were apparently the holders of the President's Cup (a shield competition run throughout the season whereby a team holds the shield until they lose a game, with it then being passed to the side that beat them) at the end of the season. Their 2008 position is not known, although it is recorded that they lost the shield in the first round of matches of the season to Moaula United.

Adidas finished 6th in the 2009–10 season on 24 points, winning 7 and drawing 3 of their 20 matches. The 2010–11 season saw them produce their best performance to date, a third-place finish behind Cruz Azul and Moaula United, although the league table appears incomplete and sources acknowledge that there are numerous arithmetical inconsistencies in it.

Their performance in the 2011–12 season is no known, though they finished in 5th place on goal difference in the 2012–13 season.
