= One Way Wind =

- Ground: Toleafoa J.S Blatter Soccer Stadium
- League: Samoa National League
- 2012–13: 4th
Home colours	Away colours

One Way Wind is a Samoan football club. It currently plays in the Samoa National League.

== History ==
The first recorded appearance of One Way Wind in the Samoan football league system was in 2010–11 when they finished third in the Samoan first division. It is unclear whether there were play-offs for promotion or indeed, whether the club were promoted at all, because details are missing for the next season. However, they finished fourth in 2012–13, above Adidas Soccer Club on goal difference, but behind Kiwi, with 37 points, winning 11 and drawing four of their 22 games.
