= Moaula United FC =

- Ground: Toleafoa J.S Blatter Soccer Stadium
- Capacity: 3,500
- Chairman: Frank Harland
- Manager: Pablo Astudillo
- League: Samoa National League
- 2018: 4th
Home colours	Away colours

Moaula United is a Samoan football club based in Apia. It currently plays in Samoa National League.

== History ==
The first recorded appearance of Moaula in the Samoa National League was in the 2001 season. Their final league position is not known, but it is known that they lost 3–0 to Strickland Brothers Lepea and 13–1 to Goldstar Sogi, the eventual runners up and winners of the league respectively, results that helped, presumably, to get them relegated as they did not compete in the following seasons' competition. Their next recorded appearance in the National league was in 2008, where although their final position is not known, they won the President's Cup (a shield competition on-going throughout the season whereby one team holds the shield until they are beaten. They then hand the shield over to the victors), defeating Adidas Soccer Club in the first round of matches. It is not known for how long they held on to the shield.

In the 2009–10 season they one their first, and to date only, national championship. winning 18 of 22 games and beating Cruz Azul to the title by five points. In this season they also finished runners up in the Samoa Cup, losing 3–1 to Kiwi in the final. The following season they were unable to defend their title, finishing as runners up to Kiwi. Their position the following season is not known, but they finished runners up again in 2012–13, this time to Lupe ole Soaga. During this season, they scored 149 goals in 22 games and Rudy Gosche was top scorer in the league.

== Honours ==
Samoa National League:

- Winners: 2009–10
- Runners up: 2010–11, 2012–13

Samoa Cup:

- Runners up: 2009–10

== Squad ==
As of 2010–11 season:

Note: Flags indicate national team as defined under FIFA eligibility rules; some limited exceptions apply. Players may hold more than one non-FIFA nationality.

No.	Pos.	Nation	Player
1	FW	SAM	Luki Gosche
2	FW	SAM	Spencer Keli
3	MF	SAM	Sopo FaKaua
