= Titavi FC =

Titavi
- Founded: 2000
- Ground: Toleafoa J.S Blatter Soccer Stadium
- League: Samoa National League

Titavi was a Samoan football club. It played in the Samoa National League for one season in 2000, which it won.

== History ==
The first and only time Titavi FC is recorded as having competed in the Samoan National League was in 2000. Sources describe them as being very close in quality to the national team. The team completed the 2000 season winning all 9 league games, scoring 39 goals and conceding 2. They did not play their last game against Vaiala as they had already achieved an insurmountable position. They won the league by three points from Goldstar Sogi.

== Honours ==
- Samoa National League
  - Champions (1): 2000
