= 1980 Samoa National League =

Samoa National League
- Season: 1980
- Champions: Vaivase-tai

The 1980 Samoa National League, or also known as the Upolo First Division, was the 2nd edition of the Samoa National League, the top league of the Football Federation Samoa. Vaivase-tai won their second title, eventually becoming the second in a three title streak.
