= 1982 Samoa National League =

Samoa National League
- Season: 1982
- Champions: Alafua FC

The 1982 Samoa National League, or also known as the Upolo First Division, was the 4th edition of the Samoa National League, the top league of the Football Federation Samoa. Alafua FC won their first title.
