= AS Dragons =

AS Dragons is the name of:

- AS Dragons (Kinshasa), Congolese football club
- AS Dragons FC de l'Ouémé, Beninese football club
- A.S. Dragon (football club), Tahitian football club
