= 1981 Samoa National League =

Samoa National League
- Season: 1981
- Champions: Vaivase-tai and SCOPA (shared title)

The 1981 Samoa National League, or also known as the Upolo First Division, was the 3rd edition of the Samoa National League, the top league of the Football Federation Samoa. SCOPA won their first title and Vaivase-tai won their third title, completing a three title streak.
