= 2013–14 Samoa National League =

2013-14 Samoa National League
- Season: 2013-14
- Champions: (Samoa) Kiwi FC

The 2013–14 Samoa National League was the 24th edition of the Samoa National League, the top league of the Football Federation Samoa. This season was won by Kiwi FC for a record sixth title.
