= 1979 Samoa National League =

Samoa National League
- Season: 1979
- Champions: Vaivase-tai

The 1979 Samoa National League, or also known as the Upolo First Division, was the 1st edition of the Samoa National League, the top league of the Football Federation Samoa. Vaivase-tai won their first title, eventually becoming the first in a three title streak.
