= 2001 Samoa National League =

Samoa National League
- Season: 2001
- Champions: Goldstar Sogi

The 2001 Samoa National League, or also known as the Upolo First Division, was the 13th edition of the Samoa National League, the top league of the Football Federation Samoa. Goldstar Sogi won their first title.

== Standings ==
Known results from source:

Pos	Team	Pld	W	D	L	Pts
1	Goldstar Sogi	9	8	1	0	25
2	Strickland Brothers Lepea	9	7	2	0	23
3?	Moamoa	0	-	-	-	0
4	Kiwi	0	-	-	-	0

== Top scorers ==
Year	Player	Team	Goals
2001	(Samoa) Desmond Fa'aiuaso	Strickland Brothers Lepea	17
