= Scopa (disambiguation) =

Scopa may refer to:

- Scopa, a card game
- Scopa (biology), an anatomical feature of insects
- Scopa, Piedmont, a municipality in Italy
- An acronym for the Supreme Court of Pennsylvania
- An acronym for the Standing Committee on Public Accounts, in the South African Parliament
- SCOPA FC, a Samoan football club

== See also ==
- SOCPA, the Serious Organized Crimes and Police Act, a UK anti-terrorism law
