= 2026 OFC U-19 Men's Championship qualification =

Tournament details
- Host country: Cook Islands
- Dates: 6–12 June
- Teams: 4 (from 1 confederation)
- Venue: 1 (in 1 host city)

Tournament statistics
- Matches played: 3
- Goals scored: 15 (5 per match)
- Top scorer: (Papua New Guinea) David Tita (4 goals)

The qualifying tournament for the 2026 OFC U-19 Men's Championship will be held from 6–12 June.

== Tiebreakers ==
Tie-breaking criteria for group play
The ranking of teams in the group stage was determined as follows:
1. Total points;
2. Goal difference in all group matches;
3. Goals scored in all group matches;
4. Head-to-head result between tied teams;
  1. Points in matches among the tied teams;
  2. Goal difference in matches among the tied teams;
  3. Goals scored in matches among the tied teams;
5. Fair play points in all group matches (only one deduction per player, per match):
  - One yellow card: −1 point;
  - Two yellow cards (indirect red card): −3 points;
  - Direct red card: −4 points;
  - Yellow card and direct red card: −5 points;
6. Drawing of lots.

== Teams ==
Team	Final tournament appearances
Tonga	9
Cook Islands	4
Papua New Guinea	16

== Venue ==
Qualifying tournament venues being played in Tonga in one host city in Matavera.

Cook Islands
Matavera
CIFA Academy Field
Capacity: 1,000
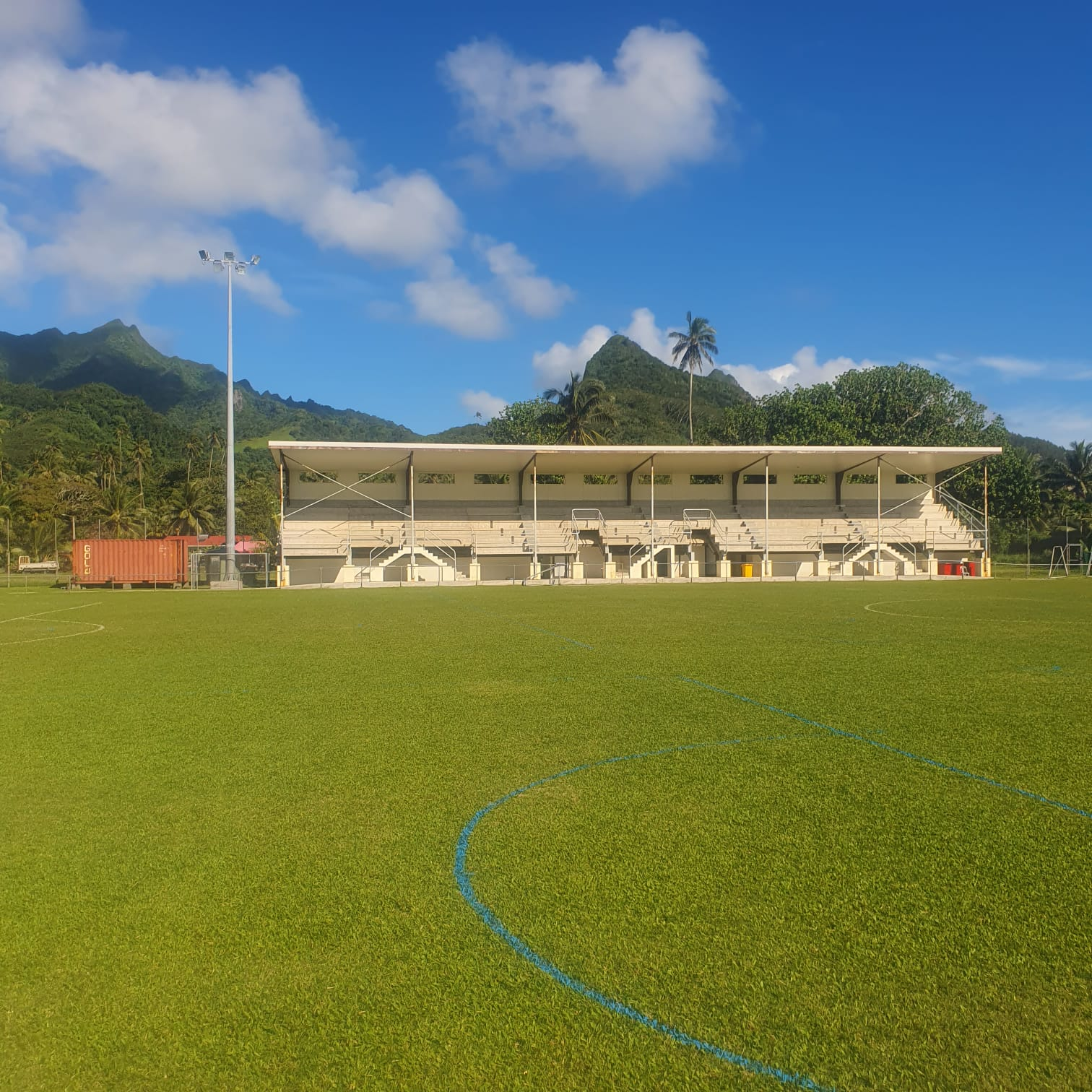

== Group stage ==
The draw for the group stage was held 25 February 2026.

=== Tiebreakers ===
Tie-breaking criteria for group play
The ranking of teams in the group stage was determined as follows:
1. Total points;
2. Goal difference in all group matches;
3. Goals scored in all group matches;
4. Head-to-head result between tied teams;
  1. Points in matches among the tied teams;
  2. Goal difference in matches among the tied teams;
  3. Goals scored in matches among the tied teams;
5. Fair play points in all group matches (only one deduction per player, per match):
  - One yellow card: −1 point;
  - Two yellow cards (indirect red card): −3 points;
  - Direct red card: −4 points;
  - Yellow card and direct red card: −5 points;
6. Drawing of lots.

=== Qualifying group ===
Pos	Team	Pld	W	D	L	GF	GA	GD	Pts	Qualification	(Papua New Guinea)	(Cook Islands)	(Tonga)
1	Papua New Guinea	2	2	0	0	9	1	+8	6	Qualify for Final tournament	—	5–1	—
2	Cook Islands (H)	2	1	0	1	5	6	−1	3		—	—	—
3	Tonga	2	0	0	2	1	8	−7	0		0–4	1–4	—

Updated to match(es) played on 6 June 2026. Source: OFC
(H) Hosts
6 June 2026
15:00

Tonga	0–4	Papua New Guinea
	OFC (Report)	Tita 14', 82', 85'; Kila 90+1'

CIFA Academy Field, Matavera, Cook Islands
Attendance: 100
Referee: Gerard Ionatana (Samoa)

9 June 2026
15:00

Tonga	1–4	Cook Islands
Moala 90+3'	(Report) (OFC)	Rongokea 16', 45+2'; Crocombe 43'; Tonga 59' (o.g.)

CIFA Academy Field, Matavera, Cook Islands
Attendance: 300
Referee: Teremoana Roihau (Tahiti)

12 June 2026
15:00

Papua New Guinea	5–1	Cook Islands
Api 15'; Moses 19'; Tita 46'; Sumabru 86'; Eron 90+5'	(OFC)	Noovao-Martin 80'

CIFA Academy Field, Matavera, Cook Islands
Attendance: 500
Referee: Gerard Ionatana (Samoa)

== Goalscorers ==
There were 9 goals scored in 2 matches, for an average of 4.5 goals per match.

4 goals

- (Papua New Guinea) David Tita

2 goals

- (Cook Islands) Dallas Rongokea

1 goal

- (Cook Islands) Josef Crocombe
- (Cook Islands) Charlie Noovao-Martin
- (Papua New Guinea) Ruel Api
- (Papua New Guinea) Jaru Eron
- (Papua New Guinea) Banjamin Kila
- (Papua New Guinea) Nalau Moses
- (Papua New Guinea) Benjamin Sambaru
- (Tonga) Fonua Moala

1 own goal

- Fetu'u Tonga (against Cook Islands)
