= 1983 Samoa National League =

Samoa National League
- Season: 1983
- Champions: Vaivase-tai

The 1983 Samoa National League, or also known as the Upolo First Division, was the 5th edition of the Samoa National League, the top league of the Football Federation Samoa. Vaivase-tai won their fourth title.
