= Alafua FC =

- Ground: Toleafoa J.S Blatter Soccer Stadium
- League: Samoa National League
- 1984: 10th
| Home colours | Away colours |

Alafua was a Samoan football club. It played in the Samoa National League.

== History ==
The first recorded appearance of Alafua in the Samoan football league system was in 1982 when they were national champions. There is no record of their involvement the following season, but in 1984, they finished 10th out of twelve teams, narrowly missing out on the relegation play-offs. Although they did not appear to be relegated at the end of the 1984 season, there is no record of them taking part in the National League in the 1985 season, although the identity of the last placed team that season is a matter for debate.

== Honours ==
Samoa National League

- Winner: 1982
