= SCOPA FC =

- Ground: Toleafoa J.S Blatter Soccer Stadium
- League: Samoa National League
- 1985: 8th
Home colours	Away colours

SCOPA was a Samoan football club. It played in the Samoa National League.

== History ==
The first recorded appearance of SCOPA in the Samoan football league system was in 1981, when they shared the national championship with Vaivase-tai, the only time the Samoan national football championship has ever been shared between two clubs. They also participated in the 1984 and 1985 seasons. They finished the 1984 season in 8th place on 10 points, one point above Laiovaea, but below Moamoatai on goal difference, winning four and drawing two of their 11 games. They finished in the same position the following season, five points clear of Laiovaea, but below three teams (Vaivase-uta, Togafuafua and Faatoia) on goal difference, again winning five and drawing two of their 11 games. It is not known whether they competed again in the National League.

== Honours ==
Samoa National League

- Winner: 1981
