= 2025 OFC Men's Champions League =

Tournament details
- Host countries: Qualifying stage: Cook Islands; Final tournament: Solomon Islands
- Dates: Qualifying: 8–14 February; Competition proper: 30 March – 12 April
- Teams: Competition proper: 8 Total: 10 (from 10 associations)

Final positions
- Champions: Auckland City (13th title)
- Runners-up: Hekari United

Tournament statistics
- Matches played: 15
- Goals scored: 45 (3 per match)
- Attendance: 26,969 (1,798 per match)
- Top scorer(s): Hudson Oreinima (Central Coast) (5 goals)
- Best player(s): Dylan Manickum (Auckland City)
- Best goalkeeper: Dave Tomare (Hekari United)
- Fair play award: Auckland City

The 2025 OFC Men's Champions League was the 23th edition of the Oceanian club championship. Organized by the Oceania Football Confederation (OFC), it is Oceania's premier club football tournament. This was the second season under the current OFC Men's Champions League name. The winners of the 2025 OFC Men's Champions League automatically qualified for the 2025 FIFA Intercontinental Cup.

== Teams ==
Location of teams of the 2025 OFC Champions League.
Teams entering the Group Stage; (H) Final tournament host
Teams entering the qualifying stage; (h) Qualifying stage host

A total of 18 teams from all 11 OFC member associations may enter the competition.

- Seven associations (Fiji, New Caledonia, New Zealand, Papua New Guinea, Solomon Islands, Tahiti, Vanuatu) are awarded one berth each in the group stage, after playing a national playoff between the top two clubs in their league.
- Four associations (American Samoa, Cook Islands, Samoa, Tonga) are awarded one berth each in the qualifying stage, with the winners advancing to the group stage. However, for this edition, no team from Tonga was present in the draw.

Qualified teams for 2025 OFC Men's Champions League
Entry round		Teams			
Group stage		(Fiji) Rewa (CW)	(New Caledonia) Tiga Sport (1st)	(New Zealand) Auckland City (CW)	(Papua New Guinea) Hekari United (CW)
Group stage		(Solomon Islands) Central Coast (CW)	(French Polynesia) Pirae (CW)	(Vanuatu) Ifira Black Bird (CW)	
Qualifying stage	PR	(American Samoa) Royal Puma (3rd)	(Cook Islands) Tupapa Maraerenga (CW)	(Samoa) Vaipuna (CW)	

Notes

1. New Caledonia (NCL): No champion was declared for the 2024 New Caledonia Super Ligue season due to its mid-season cancellation. The New Caledonian Football Federation has consulted the Confederation for the New Caledonian representatives in the OCL, and is confirmed to be the league leaders AS Tiga Sport.

== Schedule ==
Schedule for 2025 OFC Men's Champions League
Phase	Round	Draw date	First leg	Second leg
Qualifying stage	Preliminary group (Cook Islands)	11 December 2024	8 February	
Qualifying stage	Preliminary group (Cook Islands)	11 December 2024	11 February	
Qualifying stage	Preliminary group (Cook Islands)	11 December 2024	14 February	
Group stage	Matchday 1	11 December 2024	30–31 March	
Group stage	Matchday 2	11 December 2024	2–3 April	
Group stage	Matchday 3	11 December 2024	5–6 April	
Knockout phase	Semi-finals	11 December 2024	9 April	
Knockout phase	Final	11 December 2024	12 April	

== Qualifying stage ==
=== Preliminary group ===
The draw was held on 11 December 2024 at OFC Headquarters in Auckland. For this edition, no team from Tonga was present in the draw. The three teams in the qualifying stage played each other on a round-robin basis at a centralised venue in Cook Islands. The winners advanced to the group stage to join Rewa, Tiga Sport, Auckland City and the four winners from the national playoffs.

Pos	Team	Pld	W	D	L	GF	GA	GD	Pts	Qualification	TUP	VAI	RPU
1	(Cook Islands) Tupapa Maraerenga (H)	2	1	1	0	5	4	+1	4	Group stage	—	—	—
2	(Samoa) Vaipuna	2	1	0	1	5	2	+3	3		1–2	—	—
3	(American Samoa) Royal Puma	2	0	1	1	3	7	−4	1		3–3	0–4	—

Source: OFC
(H) Hosts

== Final tournament ==
=== Qualified teams ===
Teams entering the Group stage	Teams qualified from the qualifying round
(Fiji) Rewa; (New Caledonia) Tiga Sport; (New Zealand) Auckland City; (Papua New Guinea) Hekari United; (Solomon Islands) Central Coast; (French Polynesia) Pirae; (Vanuatu) Ifira Black Bird	(Cook Islands) Tupapa Maraerenga (Note: The identity of the qualifying winners was not known at the time of the final draw)

=== Draw result ===
Group A
Pos	Team
A1	(New Zealand) Auckland City
A2	(French Polynesia) Pirae
A3	(New Caledonia) Tiga Sport
A4	(Fiji) Rewa

Group B
Pos	Team
B1	(Vanuatu) Ifira Black Bird
B2	(Cook Islands) Tupapa Maraerenga
B3	(Papua New Guinea) Hekari United
B4	(Solomon Islands) Central Coast

=== Venues ===
All matches were held at the Lawson Tama Stadium and the National Stadium in Honiara.

Solomon Islands
Honiara
Lawson Tama Stadium	National Stadium
Capacity: 20,000	Capacity: 10,000
2025 OFC Men's Champions League is located in Solomon Islands

== Group stage ==
The group stage matches were originally scheduled to take place in Fiji. However, due to venue availability issues, the group stage is moved to Honiara, Solomon Islands, and was played from 30 March to 6 April 2025.

=== Group A ===
Pos	Team	Pld	W	D	L	GF	GA	GD	Pts	Qualification	AUC	TIG	PIR	REW
1	(New Zealand) Auckland City	3	2	1	0	4	1	+3	7	Knockout stage	—	2−0	1–0	—
2	(New Caledonia) Tiga Sport	3	1	1	1	5	5	0	4	Knockout stage	—	—	—	4–2
3	(French Polynesia) Pirae	3	1	1	1	2	2	0	4		—	1–1	—	—
4	(Fiji) Rewa	3	0	1	2	3	6	−3	1		1–1	—	0−1	—

Source: OFC

=== Group B ===
Pos	Team	Pld	W	D	L	GF	GA	GD	Pts	Qualification	HEK	IFI	CEN	TUP
1	(Papua New Guinea) Hekari United	3	2	1	0	13	1	+12	7	Knockout stage	—	—	3−0	—
2	(Vanuatu) Ifira Black Bird	3	1	2	0	5	2	+3	5	Knockout stage	1−1	—	—	3−0
3	(Solomon Islands) Central Coast (H)	3	1	1	1	8	4	+4	4		—	1−1	—	7−0
4	(Cook Islands) Tupapa Maraerenga	3	0	0	3	0	19	−19	0		0−9	—	—	—

Source: OFC
(H) Hosts

== Knockout stage ==
The four teams in the knockout stage played on a single-elimination basis, with each tie played as a single match at the Solomon Islands National Stadium.

=== Bracket ===
Semi-finals
9 April 2025
(New Zealand) Auckland City	2
(Vanuatu) Ifira Black Bird	0
9 April 2025
(Papua New Guinea) Hekari United	1
(New Caledonia) Tiga Sport	0

Final
12 April 2025
(New Zealand) Auckland City	2
(Papua New Guinea) Hekari United	0

=== Semi-finals ===
Team 1	Score	Team 2
Auckland City (New Zealand)	2–0	(Vanuatu) Ifira Black Bird
Hekari United (Papua New Guinea)	1–0	(New Caledonia) Tiga Sport

=== Grand Final ===
In the final, the two semi-final winners played against each other. The final was played on 12 April 2025.

12 April 2025
18:00 UTC+11

Auckland City (New Zealand)	2−0	(Papua New Guinea) Hekari United
Bevan 39', 83' (pen.)	Report

National Stadium, Honiara
Attendance: 6,000
Referee: Facundo Tello (Argentina)

== Statistics ==
=== Top goalscorers ===
Rank	Player	Team	Goals
1	(Solomon Islands) Hudson Oreinima	(Solomon Islands) Central Coast	5
2	(Papua New Guinea) Rex Naime	(Papua New Guinea) Hekari United	4
3	(New Zealand) Myer Bevan	(New Zealand) Auckland City	3
3	(New Zealand) Haris Zeb	(New Zealand) Auckland City	3
5	(Papua New Guinea) Nathaniel Eddie	(Papua New Guinea) Hekari United	2
5	(Papua New Guinea) Joseph Joe	(Papua New Guinea) Hekari United	2
5	(New Zealand) Dylan Manickum	(New Zealand) Auckland City	2
5	(Solomon Islands) John Orobulu	(Fiji) Rewa	2
5	(New Caledonia) Mickael Partodikromo	(New Caledonia) Tiga Sport	2
5	(Papua New Guinea) Pala Paul	(Papua New Guinea) Hekari United	2
5	(Brazil) Lucas Santos	(Papua New Guinea) Hekari United	2
5	(Vanuatu) Jordy Tasip	(Vanuatu) Ifira Black Bird	2

== Awards ==
Award	Winner	Team
Golden Ball	(New Zealand) Dylan Manickum	(New Zealand) Auckland City
Golden Boot	(Solomon Islands) Hudson Oreinima	(Solomon Islands) Central Coast
Golden Glove	(Papua New Guinea) Dave Tomare	(Papua New Guinea) Hekari United
Fair Play Award	—N/a	(New Zealand) Auckland City
