= 2007 Samoa National League =

Samoa National League
- Season: 2007
- Champions: Cruz Azul (Samoa)

The 2007 Samoa National League, or also known as the Upolo First Division, was the 19th edition of the Samoa National League, the top league of the Football Federation Samoa. Cruz Azul (Samoa) won their first title, defeating Strickland Brothers Lepea in the final.
