= 2025 OFC Men's Champions League group stage =

The 2025 OFC Champions League group stage was played from 30 March to 6 April 2025. A total of 8 teams competed in the group stage to decide the four places in the knockout stage of the 2025 OFC Men's Champions League. After originally being planned to be hosted by Fiji, OFC announced Solomon Islands would instead host the tournament due to lack of available venues in Fiji.

== Draw ==
The draw of the group stage took place at OFC Home of Football in Auckland, New Zealand on 11 December 2024. The 8 teams were drawn into two groups of four. Not all teams were known at the time of the draw.

Direct qualifiers	Preliminary group winner
(Fiji) Rewa; (New Caledonia) Tiga Sport; (New Zealand) Auckland City; (Papua New Guinea) Hekari United; (Solomon Islands) Central Coast; (French Polynesia) Pirae; (Vanuatu) Ifira Black Bird	(Cook Islands) Tupapa Maraerenga

== Format ==
The four teams in each group played each other on a round-robin basis at two centralised venues in Solomon Islands. The winners and runners-up of each group advanced to the semi-finals of the knockout stage.

== Schedule ==
Matchday	Dates		Matches
Matchday	Group A	Group B	Matches
Matchday 1	30 March 2025	31 March 2025	Team 1 vs. Team 2, Team 3 vs. Team 4
Matchday 2	2 April 2025	3 April 2025	Team 1 vs. Team 3, Team 4 vs. Team 2
Matchday 3	5 April 2025	6 April 2025	Team 4 vs. Team 1, Team 2 vs. Team 3

== Groups ==
=== Group A ===
All times are local, SBT (UTC+11).

Pos	Team	Pld	W	D	L	GF	GA	GD	Pts	Qualification	AUC	TIG	PIR	REW
1	(New Zealand) Auckland City	3	2	1	0	4	1	+3	7	Knockout stage	—	2−0	1–0	—
2	(New Caledonia) Tiga Sport	3	1	1	1	5	5	0	4	Knockout stage	—	—	—	4–2
3	(French Polynesia) Pirae	3	1	1	1	2	2	0	4		—	1–1	—	—
4	(Fiji) Rewa	3	0	1	2	3	6	−3	1		1–1	—	0−1	—

Source: OFC
30 March 2025
12:00

Tiga Sport (New Caledonia)	4–2	(Fiji) Rewa
Partodikromo 14' (pen.); Waia 45'; Wadra 50'; Upa 56'	Report	Valevou 30'; Orobulu 72'

Lawson Tama Stadium, Honiara
Attendance: 1,473
Referee: Arnold Tari (Vanuatu)
30 March 2025
15:00

Auckland City (New Zealand)	1–0	(French Polynesia) Pirae
Manickum 41'	Report

Lawson Tama Stadium, Honiara
Attendance: 2,000
Referee: Ben Aukwai (Solomon Islands)

2 April 2025
12:00

Rewa (Fiji)	0−1	(French Polynesia) Pirae
	Report	Tihoni 90+18' (pen.)

Lawson Tama Stadium, Honiara
Attendance: 1,189
Referee: Arnold Tari (Vanunatu)
2 April 2025
15:00

Auckland City (New Zealand)	2−0	(New Caledonia) Tiga Sport
Manickum 25'; Zeb 90+4'	Report

Lawson Tama Stadium, Honiara
Attendance: 1,635
Referee: Facundo Tello (Argentina)

5 April 2025
12:00

Pirae (French Polynesia)	1–1	(New Caledonia) Tiga Sport
Tave 35'	Report	Partodikromo 65' (pen.)

Lawson Tama Stadium, Honiara
Attendance: 752
Referee: Facundo Tello (Argentina)
5 April 2025
15:00

Rewa (Fiji)	1–1	(New Zealand) Auckland City
Orobulu 90+5'	Report	Zeb 12'

Lawson Tama Stadium, Honiara
Attendance: 1,077
Referee: Norbert Hauata (Tahiti)

=== Group B ===
All times are local, TAH (UTC-10).

Pos	Team	Pld	W	D	L	GF	GA	GD	Pts	Qualification	HEK	IFI	CEN	TUP
1	(Papua New Guinea) Hekari United	3	2	1	0	13	1	+12	7	Knockout stage	—	—	3−0	—
2	(Vanuatu) Ifira Black Bird	3	1	2	0	5	2	+3	5	Knockout stage	1−1	—	—	3−0
3	(Solomon Islands) Central Coast (H)	3	1	1	1	8	4	+4	4		—	1−1	—	7−0
4	(Cook Islands) Tupapa Maraerenga	3	0	0	3	0	19	−19	0		0−9	—	—	—

Source: OFC
(H) Hosts
31 March 2025
12:00

Ifira Black Bird (Vanuatu)	3−0	(Cook Islands) Tupapa Maraerenga
Lency 10' (pen.); Tenene 26'; Tasip 63'	Report

National Stadium, Honiara
Attendance: 1,302
Referee: Veer Singh (Fiji)
31 March 2025
15:00

Hekari United (Papua New Guinea)	3−0	(Solomon Islands) Central Coast
Santos 12'; J. Joe 52'; Wally 87'	Report

National Stadium, Honiara
Attendance: 1,300
Referee: CK Kawana-Waugh (New Zealand)

3 April 2025
12:00

Ifira Black Bird (Vanuatu)	1−1	(Papua New Guinea) Hekari United
Tasip 67'	Report	E. Joe 81'

National Stadium, Honiara
Attendance: 1,382
Referee: Calvin Berg (New Zealand)
3 April 2025
15:00

Central Coast (Solomon Islands)	7−0	(Cook Islands) Tupapa Maraerenga
Oreinima 8', 45', 49', 59', 66'; Leslie 22'; Supa 82'	Report

National Stadium, Honiara
Attendance: 500
Referee: Norbert Hauata (Tahiti)

6 April 2025
12:00

Tupapa Maraerenga (Cook Islands)	0−9	(Papua New Guinea) Hekari United
	Report	Santos 20'; Naime 27', 36', 59'; Eddie 38', 50'; Paul 47', 68'; J. Joe 56' (pen.)

National Stadium, Honiara
Attendance: 1,596
Referee: Veer Singh (Fiji)
6 April 2025
15:00

Central Coast (Solomon Islands)	1−1	(Vanuatu) Ifira Black Bird
Tahioa 64'	Report	Tenene 47'

National Stadium, Honiara
Attendance: 3,617
Referee: Calvin Berg (New Zealand)
