= 2006 Samoa National League =

Samoa National League
- Season: 2006
- Champions: Vaivase-tai

The 2006 Samoa National League, or also known as the Upolo First Division, was the 18th edition of the Samoa National League, the top league of the Football Federation Samoa. Vaivase-tai won their sixth title, the last in the record number of titles by any team in the Samoa National League.

The only recorded detail of this tournament is that Vaivase-tai beat Cruz Azul (Samoa) in the final.
