= Samoa Cup =

- Founded: 2010
- Country: Samoa
- Number of clubs: 12
- Current champions: Kiwi (2nd title)
- Most championships: Kiwi (2 titles)
- Current: 2014 Samoa Cup

The Samoa Cup is a Samoan domestic football tournament held each year since 2010 (excluding 2012). The most recent winners of the tournament were Kiwi FC in the 2014 edition.

== Past winners ==
Samoa Cup finals
Season	Winner	Score	Runner-up	Venue
2010	Kiwi FC	3–1	Moaula United	National Soccer Stadium
2011	Moaula United	5-2	Kiwi FC	National Soccer Stadium
2013	Lupe ole Soaga	2-1	Kiwi FC	National Soccer Stadium
2014	Kiwi FC	-	-	National Soccer Stadium
2018	Manu-fili	-	-	National Soccer Stadium

The cup returned in 2018, with the National League teams placed into five different zone teams. Manu-fili were the winners as the top team of the round-robin.

== Performances ==
Samoa Cup finalists by team
Team	Winners	Runners-up	Years won	Years runner-up
Kiwi FC	2	2	2010, 2014	2011, 2013
Moaula United	1	1	2011	2010
Lupe ole Soaga	1	0	2013	-
Manu-fili	1	0	2018	-
