= Cruz Azul Mexicana =

Cruz Azul Mexicana ("Mexican Blue Cross") was a charitable organization established by Mexican-Americans in San Antonio, Texas in the 1920s. The Handbook of Texas said that the women who started Cruz Azul Mexicana were likely of the upper class. The organization originated from the mutual-aid societies established in the final quarter of the 19th century by Texan Mexicans. According to the Handbook, the Great Depression likely lead to the demise of the Cruz Azul Mexicana.
