= 1985 Samoa National League =

Samoa National League
- Season: 1985
- Champions: Kiwi FC
- Matches played: 121

The 1985 Samoa National League, or also known as the Upolo First Division, was the 7th edition of the Samoa National League, the top league of the Football Federation Samoa. Kiwi F.C. won their second title, eventually becoming the second in a three title streak.

== Standings ==
Pos	Team	Pld	W	D	L	Pts
1	Kiwi (C)	11	9	1	1	19
2	Vaivase-tai	11	8	1	2	17
3	Marist	11	6	2	3	14
4	Vaipuna	11	5	4	2	14
5	Vaivase-uta	11	5	4	2	14
6	Togafuafua	11	3	6	2	12
7	Faatoia	11	5	2	4	12
8	SCOPA	11	5	2	4	12
9	Laiovaea	11	3	1	7	7
10	Lotopa	11	3	0	8	6
11	USP	11	3	0	8	6
12	Moamoatai (Note: Sources question the identity and record of the twelfth place team, may not have been Moamoatai.)	11	0	1	10	1

Rules for classification: 1) points; 2) goal difference; 3) number of goals scored.
(C) Champions
