= 2025 OFC Men's Champions League knockout stage =

The 2025 OFC Men's Champions League knockout stage was played from 9 to 12 April 2025. A total of four teams competed in the knockout stage to decide the champions of the 2025 OFC Men's Champions League.

All times are local, SBT (UTC+11).

== Qualified teams ==
The winners and runners-up of each of the two groups in the group stage advanced to the semi-finals.

Group	Winners	Runners-up
A	(New Zealand) Auckland City	(New Caledonia) Tiga Sport
B	(Papua New Guinea) Hekari United	(Vanuatu) Ifira Black Bird

== Format ==
The four teams in the knockout stage played on a single-elimination basis, with each tie played as a single match at the Solomon Islands National Stadium.

== Schedule ==
The schedule of each round is as follows.

Round	Match dates
Semi-finals	9 April 2025
Final	12 April 2025 at National Stadium, Honiara

== Bracket ==
Semi-finals
9 April 2025
(New Zealand) Auckland City	2
(Vanuatu) Ifira Black Bird	0
9 April 2025
(Papua New Guinea) Hekari United	1
(New Caledonia) Tiga Sport	0

Final
12 April 2025
(New Zealand) Auckland City	2
(Papua New Guinea) Hekari United	0

== Semi-finals ==
Team 1	Score	Team 2
Auckland City (New Zealand)	2–0	(Vanuatu) Ifira Black Bird
Hekari United (Papua New Guinea)	1–0	(New Caledonia) Tiga Sport

9 April 2025
12:00

Auckland City (New Zealand)	2−0	(Vanuatu) Ifira Black Bird
Zeb 25'; Bevan 86'	Report

National Stadium, Honiara
Attendance: 1,125
Referee: Norbert Hauata (Tahiti)

9 April 2025
16:00

Hekari United (Papua New Guinea)	1−0	(New Caledonia) Tiga Sport
Naime 27'	Report

National Stadium, Honiara
Attendance: 2,021
Referee: CK Kawana-Waugh (New Zealand)

== Final ==
In the final, the two semi-final winners played against each other. The final was played on 12 April 2025.

12 April 2025
18:00 UTC+11

Auckland City (New Zealand)	2−0	(Papua New Guinea) Hekari United
Bevan 39', 83' (pen.)	Report

National Stadium, Honiara
Attendance: 6,000
Referee: Facundo Tello (Argentina)
