= 2011–12 Samoa National League =

2011-12 Samoa National League
- Season: 2011-12
- Champions: Kiwi FC

The 2011–12 Samoa National League was the 22nd edition of the Samoa National League, the top league of the Football Federation Samoa. This season was won by Kiwi FC for the fourth recorded time, and also the second title in a row.
