= A.S. Dragon (football) =

Association football club in Tahiti

AS Dragon
- Full name: Association Sportive Dragon
- Nickname: "Dragons"/ "Dragões"/ "Dragones"
- Founded: 1968; 57 years ago
- Ground: Stade Pater
- Capacity: 11,700
- Chairman: Charles Fong Loi
- Manager: Efrain Araneda
- League: Tahiti First Division
- 2024–25: 4th

Association Sportive Dragon is a football club based in Papeete, Tahiti. They play in the Tahiti First Division, who play their home games at Stade Pater, in Pirae.

The club was founded in 1968 by Arthur Chung to represent French Polynesia's Chinese community. Over time the team has evolved to include a diverse mix of cultures, and mostly consists of semi-professional players with day jobs. In the 2011–12 season they won the championship for the first time and qualified for the 2012–13 OFC Champions League.

== Continental record ==
Season	Round	Club	Result
2012–13	Group B	(New Zealand) Waitakere United	0–0
2012–13	Group B	(New Caledonia) Mont-Dore	4–1
2012–13	Group B	(New Zealand) Waitakere United	0–1
2012–13	Group B	(New Zealand) Auckland City	3–1
2012–13	Group B	(New Caledonia) Mont-Dore	1–1
2012–13	Group B	(New Zealand) Auckland City	1–1
2013–14	Group B	(Vanuatu) Amicale	0–1
2013–14	Group B	(New Zealand) Auckland City	0–3
2013–14	Group B	(Fiji) Nadi F.C.	5–0
2018	Group B	(New Caledonia) Lössi	4–0
2018	Group B	(Vanuatu) Erakor Golden Star	4–3
2018	Group B	(Solomon Islands) Solomon Warriors	1–2
2018	Quarter-finals	(Fiji) Lautoka	1–2

== Current squad ==
Squad for the 2019-20 Tahiti Ligue 1

Note: Flags indicate national team as defined under FIFA eligibility rules; some limited exceptions apply. Players may hold more than one non-FIFA nationality.

No.	Pos.	Nation	Player
1	GK	TAH	Benjamin Tardivel
2	DF	TAH	Victor Snow
3	DF	TAH	Teataura Hauata
4	DF	TAH	Heimana Tavere
6	DF	TAH	Hennel Tehaamoana
7	MF	TAH	Salomon Tevepauhu
8	MF	TAH	Ariitapu Asen
9	MF	TAH	Samuel Hnanyine
10	FW	TAH	Roonui Tehau
11	FW	TAH	Raiamanu Tetauira
13	MF	TAH	Manuarii Hauata

No.	Pos.	Nation	Player
14	FW	TAH	Denji Kaiha
15	MF	TAH	Philippe Peni
16	DF	TAH	Jonathan Mou
17	MF	TAH	Diego Araneda
19	FW	NCL	Allan Hnyeikone
20	DF	TAH	Henri Chanon
22	MF	TAH	Clyde Tiniau
23	FW	TAH	Rainui Tze-Yu
24	DF	NCL	Jacques Wamytan
25	DF	NCL	Gabriel Vakoume
29	FW	TAH	Tutehau Tufariua

== Staff ==
Position	Name
Coach	(French Polynesia) Efrain Araneda

== Achievements ==
- Tahiti First Division: 3

2011–12, 2012–13, 2016–17

- Tahiti Cup: 7

1997, 2001, 2004, 2013, 2016, 2018, 2024

- Tahiti Coupe des Champions: 2

1997, 2016.

=== Last seasons ===
Season	League/position
2012–13	1st in Ligue 1 - Qualified to OFC Champions League. Group stage at OFC Champions League. Tahiti Cup champions.
2013–14	6th in Ligue 1. Group stage at OFC Champions League. 7th Round of Coupe de France Tahiti Cup runners-up
2014–15	3rd in Ligue 1. Quarter finals of Tahiti Cup
2015–16	6th in Ligue 1. Tahiti Cup champions
2016–17	2nd in Ligue 1 - Qualified to OFC Champions League. 7th Round of Coupe de France. Semifinals of Tahiti Cup
2017–18	3rd in Ligue 1. Quarter finals at OFC Champions League. Tahiti Cup champions.
2018–19	6th in Ligue 1. 7th Round of Coupe de France. Round 1 of Tahiti Cup.
2019–20	4th in Ligue 1. Round 2 of Tahiti Cup.
