= Goldstar Sogi FC =

Goldstar Sogi
- Ground: Toleafoa J. S. Blatter Soccer Stadium
- Capacity: 3,500
- League: Samoa National League
- 2012–13: 11th

Goldstar Sogi was a Samoan football club based in Sogi. It last played in the Samoa National League.

== History ==
The first record of Goldstar playing in the Samoan National League was in 1999, where, as runners up in the southern qualifying group they entered the Champion of Champions final tournament behind Moata'a. They finished in second place, losing only once to eventual Champions Moata'a. They finished runners up the following season as well, beating the Samoa Under 20 team who finished second, but losing out to Titavi, an elite side very close to the national team.

Goldstar went one better in the 2001 season, winning what to date is their only national title, going undefeated throughout the whole season to win the league by two points from Strickland Brothers Lepea. They were unable to defend their title the next season, missing out by two points and losing their only game to the eventual winners, Strickland Brothers Lepea. The 2003 season was a repeat of the 2002 season for Goldstar, with them again finishing runners up to Strickland Brothers and again losing only to them.

In 2004, Goldstar finished third, where for a third season in a row they were beaten to the championship by Strickland Brothers and this time to second place by Lupe ole Soaga. Their final position in 2005 is not known, although it is known that they topped the league after three rounds of matches, only to fall away to fourth after nine rounds. Final positions are not known for the next three seasons. In the 2009–10 season, they finished fourth ahead of Apia Youth but behind Kiwi on 38 points, winning 11 and drawing 5 of their 20 games. Their performance dipped slightly the following season where they finished sixth, ahead of Moata'a, but behind Central United on 22 points, winning six and drawing four of their 18 games. There is no information on their performance the next season, but in 2012–13 they finished second to bottom, due in part to a 27–3 loss to Moaula when they fielded a depleted 7-man team.

== Honours ==
Samoa National League:

- Winners: 1 – 2001
- Runners up: 4 – 1999, 2000, 2002, 2003
