= Mickaël Partodikromo =

New Caledonian footballer (born 1996)

Personal information
- Full name: Mickaël Partodikromo
- Date of birth: 2 February 1996 (age 30)
- Place of birth: Nouméa, New Caledonia
- Height: 1.78 m (5 ft 10 in)
- Position: Midfielder

Team information
- Current team: Tiga Sport
- Number: 6

Youth career
- AS Mont-Dore
- 2010–2013: Asia-Pacific Football Academy
- 2013–2014: Sheffield United

Senior career*
Years	Team	Apps	(Gls)
2014–2015	Team Wellington	8	(0)
2015–2016	Racing Club de Paris	0	(0)
2016–2017	Rushall Olympic	38	(0)
2017–2018	Sutton Coldfield Town	4	(0)
2020–2021	Madura United	0	(0)
2021–2022	Karketu Dili	5	(0)
2022–2024	Saint Sébastien		
2025–	Tiga Sport		

International career^{‡}
2013	New Caledonia U17	5	(0)
2014	New Caledonia U20	5	(0)
2015	New Caledonia U23	4	(0)
2024–	New Caledonia	2	(0)
Medal record
Men's football
Representing New Caledonia
Pacific Games
Gold medal – first place	2015 Papua New Guinea
- * Club domestic league appearances and goals as of 1 July 2022 ‡ National team caps and goals as of 24 March 2025

Mickaël Partodikromo (born 2 February 1996) is a New Caledonian footballer who plays as a defensive midfielder for Tiga Sport.

== Career ==
Partodikromo was born on 2 February 1996 in Nouméa to Bernard and Sabine. As a youth, he played for local side AS Mont-Dore. In 2010, while playing in an U16 tournament, he was scouted by the Auckland-based Asia-Pacific Football Academy, whom offered him the chance to develop further. Partodikromo graduated the academy at the end of the 2012–13 season and was quickly offered a spot with Sheffield United's youth team. After a season at Bramall Lane, he moved to Team Wellington in the New Zealand Football Championship, where he quickly made the first team and was called up to their 2014–15 OFC Champions League squad.

Partodikromo was included as a substitute for the 2015 OFC Champions League Final, where Team Wellington were beaten 4–3 on penalties after a 1–1 draw to fellow NZFC side Auckland City. Shortly after the final, he signed a contract with former French champions Racing Club de Paris. After a season in France, Partodikromo signed with Rushall Olympic in the Northern Premier League Premier Division.

In June 2016, Partodikromo was invited to trial with Worcester City, before making his fifth move in five seasons, signing with fellow Northern Premier League Premier Division side Sutton Coldfield Town.

== Personal life ==
Born in New Caledonia, Partodikromo is of French and Indonesian descent.

== Honours ==
New Caledonia U-23

- Pacific Games: Gold Medalist, 2015
