= 2008 Samoa National League =

Samoa National League
- Season: 2008
- Champions: OSM Sinamoga

The 2008 Samoa National League, or also known as the Upolo First Division, was the 20th edition of the Samoa National League, the top league of the Football Federation Samoa. OSM Sinamoga won their first record title, though it is thought that they won their first title in the unrecorded period from 1986 to 1996.
