= 2010–11 Samoa National League =

Samoa National League
- Season: 2010-11
- Champions: (Samoa) Kiwi FC

The 2010–11 Samoa National League was the 21st edition of the Samoa National League, the top league of the Football Federation Samoa. This season was won by Kiwi FC for the third recorded time.
