= Vaimoso SC =

- Full name: Vaimoso Soccer Club
- Ground: Toleafoa J.S Blatter Soccer Stadium
- League: Samoa National League
- 2017: 8th
Home colours	Away colours

Vaimoso is a Samoan football club based in Apia. It currently plays in the Samoa National League.

== History ==
The first recorded appearance of Vaimoso in the Samoan football league system was in 2010–11 when they finished first in the Samoan first division. It is unclear whether there were play-offs for promotion or indeed, whether the club were promoted at all, because details are missing for the next season. However, they finished sixth in 2012–13, below Adidas Soccer Club but above Apia Youth, with 35 points, winning 10 and drawing five of their 22 games.

== Honours ==
- Samoa First Division League
  - Champions (1): 2010–11
