= 2009–10 Samoa National League =

2009-10 Samoa National League
- Season: 2009-10
- Champions: (Samoa) Moaula United FC

The 2009–10 Samoa National League was the 20th edition of the Samoa National League, the top league of the Football Federation Samoa. This season was won by Moaula United FC for the first recorded time.
