= Vaipuna SC =

Northern Mariana Islands soccer club

Vaipuna
- Full name: Vaipuna Sports Club
- Founded: 1975; 51 years ago
- League: Samoa National League
- 2025: 1st, champions
Home colours	Away colours

Vaipuna SC is a sports club from Apia, Samoa, best known for its association football side, currently competing in the Samoa National League.

== History ==
The club was founded in 1975. In 2020, Vaipuna SC finished second in the regional Upolu Senior League. That season, Vaipuna player John Michael Tumua was the co-top scorer in the league. Vaipuna SC finished the 2021 Samoa National League season in second position in the league table, one point behind champions Lupe o le Soaga SC. That season, John Michael Tumua was the league's top scorer with forty-five goals. The club finished the 2022 season undefeated. However, they were again the league runners-up, being edged out by Vaivase-Tai FC on goal difference.

== Youth ==
Vaipuna SC also field youth sides. In 2019, the club's under-12 team won the championship in its division.

== International competitions record ==
OFC Men's Champions League results
Season	Round	Club		Home	Away	Aggregate
2025	Preliminary round	(American Samoa)	Royal Puma	4–0		2nd
2025	Preliminary round	(Cook Islands)	Tupapa Maraerenga	1–2		2nd
