= Strickland Brothers Lepea =

- Founded: 2000
- League: Samoa National League

Strickland Brothers Lepea was a Samoan football club located in Lepea. It last played in the Samoa National League.

== History ==
Sources indicate that the club were renamed Tunaimato Breeze for the Premier League Cup Champ of Champs 2004 competition, and competed under that name in both the 2005 Samoa National League, which they won, and the preliminary round of the 2006 OFC Club Championship A club under this name also competed in the 2005 season, although this could have been due to voluntary relegation to make room for Tunaimato Breeze, it is suggested that it was due to the second division team being a reserve team.

== Titles ==
- Samoa National League
  - Champions (4): 2002, 2003, 2004, 2005
