= Samoa National League =

- Founded: 1979; 47 years ago
- Country: Samoa
- Number of clubs: 12
- Level on pyramid: 1
- Domestic cup: Samoa Cup
- International cup: OFC Champions League
- Current champions: Vaipuna (2025)
- Most championships: Kiwi (7)
- Current: 2025 Samoa National League

Samoa National League is an association football league in Samoa and the top division of the Football Federation Samoa. The 3,500 capacity Toleafoa JS Blatter Soccer Stadium is the sole venue of the national league.

== Clubs ==
- Faatoia United
- Kiwi
- Lepea
- Lion of Judah
- Lupe o le Soaga (Magiagi)
- Moaula United
- Sogi
- University of South Pacific
- Vaipuna
- Vaiusu
- Vaivase-Tai
- Vaitele Uta

Teams as of the 2022 season.

== Previous winners ==
| Season | Winner |
|---|---|
| 1979 | Vaivase-Tai |
| 1980 | Vaivase-Tai |
| 1981 | Vaivase-Tai, SCOPA |
| 1982 | Alafua |
| 1983 | Vaivase-Tai |
| 1984 | Kiwi |
| 1985 | Kiwi |
| 1986–96 | Unknown |
| 1997 | Kiwi |
| 1998 | Vaivase-Tai |
| 1999 | Moata'a |
| 2000 | Titavi |
| 2001 | Goldstar Sogi |
| 2002 | Strickland Brothers Lepea |
| 2003 | Strickland Brothers Lepea |
| 2004 | Strickland Brothers Lepea |
| 2005 | Strickland Brothers Lepea |
| 2006 | Vaivase-Tai |
| 2007 | Cruz Azul |
| 2008 | Sinamoga |
| 2009–10 | Moaula United |
| 2010–11 | Kiwi |
| 2011–12 | Kiwi |
| 2012–13 | Lupe ole Soaga |
| 2013–14 | Kiwi |
| 2014–15 | Lupe ole Soaga |
| 2016 | Lupe ole Soaga |
| 2017 | Lupe ole Soaga |
| 2018 | Kiwi |
| 2019 | Lupe ole Soaga |
| 2020 | Lupe ole Soaga |
| 2021 | Lupe ole Soaga |
| 2022 | Vaivase Tai |
| 2023 | Vaipuna |
| 2024 | Vaipuna |
| 2025 | Vaipuna |

== Performances ==
Samoa National League winners by team
| Team | Wins | Years won |
|---|---|---|
| Kiwi | 7 | 1984, 1985, 1997, 2010–11, 2011–12, 2013–14, 2018 |
| Lupe ole Soaga | 7 | 2012–13, 2014–15, 2016, 2017, 2019, 2020, 2021 |
| Vaivase-Tai | 7 | 1979, 1980, 1981, 1983, 1998, 2006, 2022. |
| Strickland Brothers Lepea | 4 | 2002, 2003, 2004, 2005 |
| Vaipuna | 3 | 2023, 2024, 2025 |
| Alafua | 1 | 1982 |
| Moata'a | 1 | 1999 |
| Titavi | 1 | 2000 |
| Goldstar Sogi | 1 | 2001 |
| Cruz Azul | 1 | 2007 |
| Sinamoga | 1 | 2008 |
| Moaula United | 1 | 2009–10 |

== Top goalscorers ==
| Season | Player | Team | Goals |
|---|---|---|---|
| 2001 | (Samoa) Desmond Fa'aiuaso | Strickland Brothers Lepea | 17 |
| 2002 | (Samoa) Desmond Fa'aiuaso | Strickland Brothers Lepea | 21 |
| 2012–13 | (Samoa) Rudy Gosche | Moaula United | – |
| 2021 | (Samoa) Michael Tumua Leo | Lupe o le Soaga | 45 |
| 2024-25 | (Samoa) Nathan Viliamu | Vaipuna | 10 |

=== Hat-tricks ===
| Player | For | Against | Score | Date |
|---|---|---|---|---|
| (Samoa) Tavita To'o | Kiwi | Vaitele Uta | 4-1 | 25 May 2021 |
| (Samoa) Faavae Nunufolau | Kiwi | Vaivase-Tai | 6-2 | 14 June 2021 |
| (Samoa) John Tumua^{4} | Vaipuna | Vaitele Uta | 8–0 | 25 April 2023 |
