= Lupe o le Soaga SC =

Association football club in Samoa

Lupe o le Soaga
- Full name: Lupe o le Soaga Soccer Club
- Ground: Toleafoa J.S Blatter Soccer Stadium
- Capacity: 3,500
- Chairman: Tafilipepe Fineaso Aimaasu
- Manager: Paul Ualesi
- League: Samoa National League
- 2025: 2nd
Home colours	Away colours

Lupe o le Soaga Soccer Club is a Samoan professional football club based in Tuanaimato. It currently plays in the Samoa National League.

== History ==
Lupe o le Soaga was founded in 2011. The team played in the First Division, the second tier of the Samoa National League during the 2011–12 season where they finished runners-up to Vaimoso. They were promoted to the national league in 2012, and won the 2012-13 Samoa National League, losing only once throughout the whole season. They also won the Samoa Cup, defeating Kiwi 2–1 in the final. Kiwi took the lead, but Lupe equalised with a penalty. An additional twenty minutes extra time was played and in the second half of extra time Lupe scored the winner. The Lupe ole Soaga women's team were runner's-up in the 2012–13 women's cup final.

In the 2020 edition of the OFC Champions League they became the first team coming from the qualifying stage to win a group stage match.

In 2020 it was the top-ranked team in the national league.

The team won all three of its matches in the 2023 OFC Champions League qualifying stage, qualifying for the 2023 OFC Champions League. Injuries caused the cancellation of their last pool game, and they were withdrawn from the competition.

== Titles ==
- Samoa National League
  - Champions (7): 2012–13, 2014–15, 2016, 2017, 2019, 2020, 2021
- Samoa Cup
  - Winners (1): 2012–13

== Current technical staff ==
Position	
Head coach	(Samoa) Paul Ualesi
Assistant coach	(Samoa) Venico Ah Colt
Manager	(Samoa) La'i Tautiaga
Assistant manager	(Samoa) Mataio Toetu
Goalkeeper coach	(Samoa) Kareti Soafa
Gear Manager	(Samoa) Victor Lapalapa
Assistant Gear Manager	(Samoa) Maiseli Faasalele
Trainer	(Samoa) Soliai Letutusa

== Squad (2020) ==
Note: Flags indicate national team as defined under FIFA eligibility rules; some limited exceptions apply. Players may hold more than one non-FIFA nationality.

No.	Pos.	Nation	Player
1	GK	SAM	Mataio Toetu
2	FW	SAM	Albert Bell
3	DF	SAM	Suivai Ataga
4	DF	SAM	Ritchievoy Ueligitone
5	DF	SAM	Tauati Tanoa'i
6	DF	SAM	Andrew Setefano
7	FW	SAM	Lawrie Letutusa
9	FW	SAM	Vaa Taualai
10	MF	SAM	Jarvis Filimalae

No.	Pos.	Nation	Player
11	MF	ENG	Matthew Chant
12	DF	SAM	John Teo
13	MF	SAM	Michael Tumua Leo
14	DF	SAM	Osa Savelio
16	MF	SAM	Soliai Letutusa
17	DF	SAM	Isaako Sione
18	MF	SAM	Lapalapa Toni
20	GK	NZL	Zane Green
21	MF	SAM	Bitner Tafili

== Continental record ==
OFC Men's Champions League results
Season	Round	Club	Home	Away	Aggregate
