= Vaivase-Tai FC =

Vaivase-Tai
- Full name: Vaivase-Tai Football Club
- Ground: Toleafoa J. S. Blatter Soccer Stadium
- Capacity: 3,500
- Manager: Hoest Petana
- League: Samoa National League
- 2025: SNL, 3rd
| Home colours | Away colours |

Vaivase-Tai is a Samoan professional football club based in Tuanaimato. It currently plays in Samoa National League. As seven times champions of Samoa, they have won more recorded titles than any other club.

== History ==
Vaivase-Tai won four of the first five national championships, with only Alafua winning a championship outright prior to 1984. They won further championships in 1998 and 2006. They were also runners up in 1985.

== Titles ==
- Samoa National League: 7

1979, 1980, 1981, 1983, 1998, 2006, 2022.

== Squad (2024) ==
Note: Flags indicate national team as defined under FIFA eligibility rules; some limited exceptions apply. Players may hold more than one non-FIFA nationality.

| No. | Pos. | Nation | Player |
|---|---|---|---|
| 1 | GK | SAM | Kirk Auvele |
| 2 | DF | TUV | Clifton Lika |
| 3 | MF | SAM | Stanley Leavai |
| 4 | MF | SAM | Windsor Tevita-Tanielu |
| 5 | DF | SAM | Jerrymiah Maiava |
| 6 | MF | SAM | Peteru Tanielu |
| 7 | MF | SAM | Falaniko Nanumea |
| 8 | MF | SAM | Alman Kwan |
| 9 | MF | SAM | Alton Leiataua |

| No. | Pos. | Nation | Player |
|---|---|---|---|
| 10 | MF | SAM | Xavier Tanielu (captain) |
| 11 | FW | SAM | Dilo Tumua |
| 12 | MF | SAM | Poutasi Moata'a Faataga |
| 14 | DF | SAM | Christian Dafi Aluni |
| 15 | DF | SAM | Victor Togialeoli |
| 16 | MF | SAM | Vaa Taualai |
| 17 | DF | SAM | Tavita Alapati |
| 18 | FW | SAM | Anthony Sapolu |
| 20 | GK | SAM | Osa Savelio |

== Continental record ==
OFC Men's Champions League results
| Season | Round | Club | Home | Away | Aggregate |
