= Football Federation Samoa =

Sport governing body

OFC
- Short name: FFS
- Founded: 1968
- Headquarters: Apia
- FIFA affiliation: 1986
- OFC affiliation: 1986
- President: Papalii Leslie Petaia
- Vice-President: Fuata Lai Tautiaga
- Website: http://www.footballsamoa.ws

Football Federation Samoa is a member of the Oceania Football Confederation and is the national governing body for association football in Samoa. It was founded in 1968 and became a FIFA member in 1986. The Samoa national football team is a regular entrant into OFC competitions, including FIFA World Cup qualifying.

== Championships ==
=== Samoa National League ===
Football Federation Samoa hosts one league, the Samoa National League. The current champion of the league is Lupe o le Soaga, as of the 2017 season.

=== Samoa Cup ===
Football Federation Samoa also hosts one domestic cup, the Samoa Cup. The current champion of the cup is Kiwi FC, as of the 2014 edition.

== Gallery ==
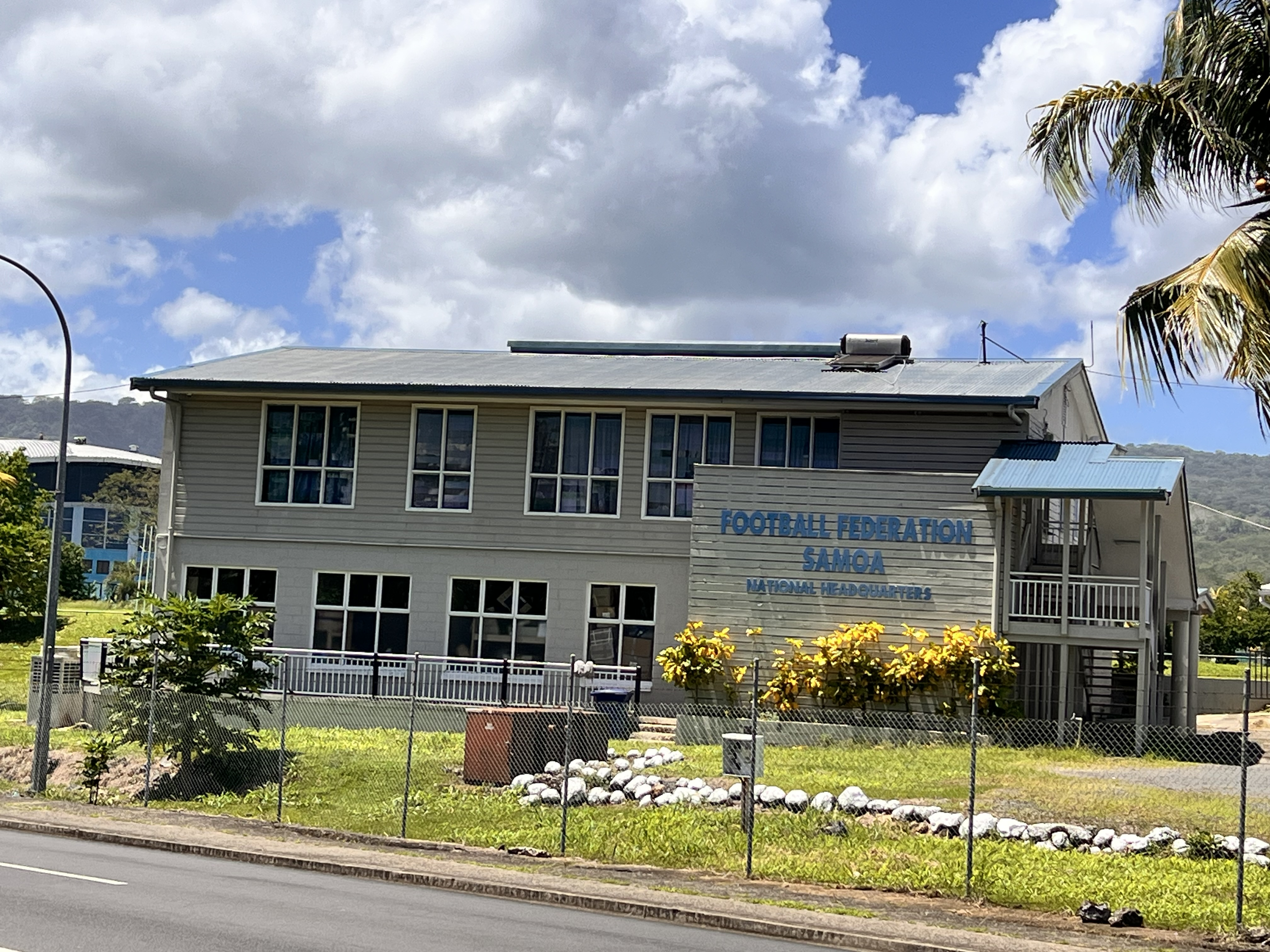
FFS Headquarters in Apia

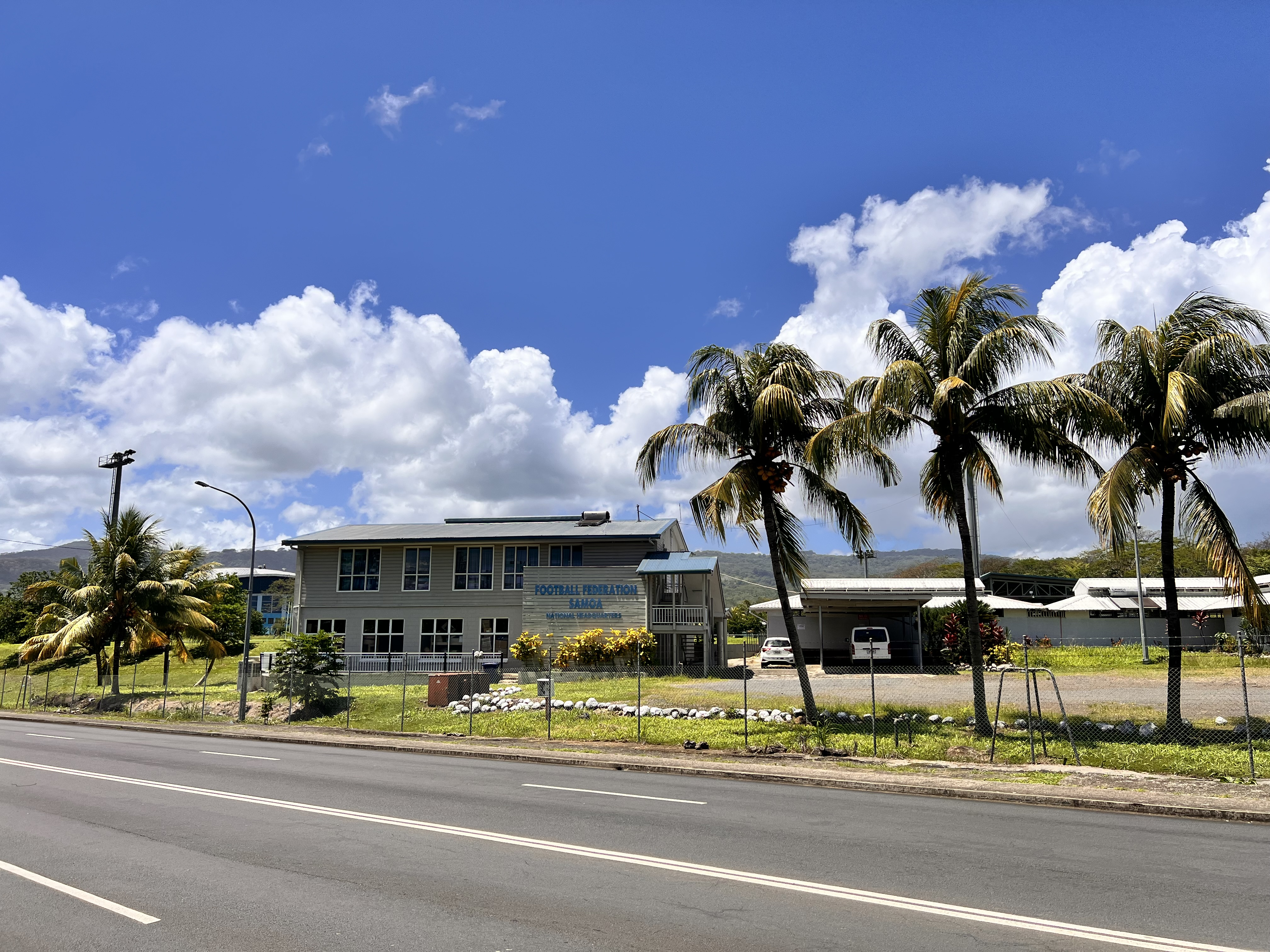
Headquarters in 2025
