= Vailima Kiwi FC =

Association football club in Samoa

Kiwi
- Full name: Vailima Kiwi FC
- Nickname: Kiwi
- Founded: 1977
- Ground: National Soccer Stadium (Samoa)
- Capacity: 3,500
- Manager: Martin Tamasese
- League: Samoa National League
- 2025: 7th
| Home colours | Away colours |

Kiwi FC is a Samoan professional football club based in Apia. It currently plays in the Samoa National League. The team has won 7 league and 2 cup titles.

== Honours ==
Former crest of Kiwi SC

- Samoa National League: 7
  - 1984, 1985, 1997, 2010/11, 2011/12, 2013/14, 2018
- Samoa Cup: 2
  - 2010, 2014

== Continental record ==
OFC Men's Champions League results
| Season | Round | Club | Home | Away | Aggregate |

1999 - 8th Place

Group Stage

Kiwi FC 0-13 Nadi FC

Kiwi FC 1-14 AS Vénus

2012-13 - 11th Place

Preliminary Round

Kiwi FC 5-1 Pago Youth

Kiwi FC 1-2 Tupapa Maraerenga

Kiwi FC 1-2 Lotoha'apai United

2013-14 - 12th Place

Preliminary Round

Kiwi FC 5-1 Pago Youth

Kiwi FC 4-2 Lotoha'apai United

Kiwi FC 3-0 Tupapa Maraerenga

Group Stage

Kiwi FC 0-2 Waitakere United

Kiwi FC 0-8 Pirae

Kiwi FC 0-8 Solomon Warriors

2016 - 12th Place

Preliminary Round

Kiwi FC 6-2 Utulei Youth

Kiwi FC 2-1 Tupapa Maraerenga

Kiwi FC 7-1 Veitongo

Group Stage

Kiwi FC 0-2 Magenta

Kiwi FC 3-4 Nadi

Kiwi FC 0-7 Tefana

The team returned to the league in 2019 after a two-year absence. They came second in the 2019 OFC Champions League qualifying stage, but was eliminated in the group stage.

== Squad (2020) ==
Note: Flags indicate national team as defined under FIFA eligibility rules; some limited exceptions apply. Players may hold more than one non-FIFA nationality.

| No. | Pos. | Nation | Player |
|---|---|---|---|
| — | GK | SAM | Semu Faimata |
| — | GK | SAM | Eti Fatu |
| — | DF | SAM | Eli Satuala |
| — | DF | SAM | Kitiona Nauer |
| — | DF | ECU | Adrián Cedeño |
| — | DF | SAM | Jarrell Sale |
| — | DF | SAM | Tavita To'o |
| — | DF | FIJ | Ansheil Kumar |
| — | DF | USA | Federico Diaz |
| — | MF | SAM | Cihan Erbil |
| — | MF | FIJ | Janardhan Goswami |

| No. | Pos. | Nation | Player |
|---|---|---|---|
| — | MF | NZL | Adam McGeorge |
| — | MF | SAM | Samuelu Malo |
| — | MF | SAM | Falaniko Nanumea |
| — | MF | SAM | Lafi Ioane |
| — | MF | SAM | Lionel Taylor |
| — | MF | SAM | Silao Malo |
| — | FW | SAM | Paulo Scanlan |
| — | FW | SAM | Timote Halahingano |
| — | FW | SAM | Lotial Mano |

== Former players ==
- (Ecuador) Adrián Cedeño
