= List of Samoa international footballers =

The Samoa national football team represents the country of Samoa in international association football. It is fielded by the Football Federation Samoa, the governing body of football in Samoa, and competes as a member of the Oceania Football Confederation (OFC), which encompasses the countries of Oceania. Samoa played their first international match on 29 August 1979 in a 12–0 loss to Fiji in Suva.

Samoa has competed in numerous competitions, and all players who have played in at least one international match, either as a member of the starting eleven or as a substitute, are listed below. Each player's details include his playing position while with the team, the number of caps earned and goals scored in all international matches, and details of the first and most recent matches played in. The names are initially ordered by number of caps (in descending order), then by date of debut, then by alphabetical order. All statistics are correct up to and including the match played on 18 July 2019.

== Key ==
Positions key
GK	Goalkeeper
DF	Defender
MF	Midfielder
FW	Forward

Position
Playing positions are listed according to the tactical formations that were employed at the time.
Caps and goals
Caps and goals comprise those in the FIFA World Cup and OFC Nations Cup, Summer Olympics, Polynesia Cup, their associated qualification matches, as well as Pacific Games, Pacific Mini Games matches and international friendly tournaments and matches.

== Players ==
Samoa national team football players
Player	Pos.	Caps	Goals	Debut		Last or most recent match		Ref.
Player	Pos.	Caps	Goals	Date	Opponent	Date	Opponent	Ref.
Desmond Fa'aiuaso	FW	20	9	7 April 2001	Tonga	5 June 2016	Papua New Guinea	
Filipo Bureta	DF	14	0	7 April 2001	Tonga	5 June 2016	Papua New Guinea	
Lionel Taylor	MF	14	1	10 May 2004	American Samoa	5 June 2016	Papua New Guinea	
Andrew Setefano	DF	14	0	17 August 2011	Fiji	18 July 2019	Vanuatu	
Junior Michael	FW	13	5	13 November 1996	Cook Islands	29 August 2007	Tonga	
Silao Malo	MF	12	2	17 August 2011	Fiji	5 June 2016	Papua New Guinea	
Pualele Lemana	DF	11	3	7 April 2001	Tonga	19 May 2004	Papua New Guinea	
Mike Saofaiga	FW	11	0	24 November 2011	Tonga	8 July 2019	Papua New Guinea	
Penitio Tumua	MF	10	2	10 May 2004	American Samoa	26 November 2011	American Samoa	
Jarrell Sale	DF	10	0	3 September 2007	Solomon Islands	4 September 2015	Tonga	
Andrew Mobberley	FW	9	2	31 August 2015	American Samoa	18 July 2019	Vanuatu	
Ambrose Asafo	MF	8	0	7 April 2001	Tonga	19 May 2004	Papua New Guinea	
Peko Victor	DF	8	0	7 April 2001	Tonga	19 May 2004	Papua New Guinea	
Edwin Tyrell	MF	7	0	9 April 2001	American Samoa	27 August 2007	American Samoa	
Vaalii Faalogo	DF	7	0	17 August 2011	Fiji	5 June 2012	New Caledonia	
Ben Lemana	MF	6	2	13 November 1996	Cook Islands	16 April 2001	Australia	
Moresi Tokuma	GK	6	2	7 April 2001	Tonga	17 May 2004	Fiji	
Peniamina Timo	MF	6	2	9 April 2001	American Samoa	18 March 2002	New Caledonia	
Bevan Kapisi	MF	6	0	14 March 2002	American Samoa	3 September 2007	Solomon Islands	
Sakaria Fuimaono	DF	6	0	10 May 2004	American Samoa	3 September 2007	Solomon Islands	
Joseph Hoeflich	MF	6	0	25 August 2007	Vanuatu	3 June 2012	Vanuatu	
Kilisimasi Toetu	GK	6	0	22 November 2011	Cook Islands	4 September 2015	Vanuatu	
Joseph Dan-Tyrell	MF	6	0	31 August 2015	American Samoa	5 June 2016	Papua New Guinea	
Johnny Hall	FW	6	2	31 August 2015	American Samoa	5 June 2016	Papua New Guinea	
Lapalapa Toni	FW	6	2	31 August 2015	American Samoa	18 July 2019	Vanuatu	
Faalavelave Matagi	GK	6	0	4 September 2015	Tonga	18 July 2019	Vanuatu	
Faimasasa Falilu	DF	5	0	7 April 2001	Tonga	18 March 2002	New Caledonia	
Iosefa Maposua	DF	5	0	16 April 2001	Australia	19 May 2004	Papua New Guinea	
Fereti Gosche	MF	5	0	25 August 2007	Vanuatu	22 November 2011	Cook Islands	
Charles Bell	DF	5	0	17 August 2011	Fiji	26 November 2011	American Samoa	
Faitalia Hamilton-Pama	DF	5	0	31 August 2011	American Samoa	12 July 2019	Tonga	
Tama Fasavalu	DF	4	3	14 March 2002	American Samoa	19 May 2004	Papua New Guinea	
Dennis Bryce	DF	4	1	10 May 2004	American Samoa	19 May 2004	Papua New Guinea	
Setefano Pesa	MF	4	0	10 May 2004	American Samoa	19 May 2004	Papua New Guinea	
Damien Fonoti	DF	4	1	25 August 2007	Vanuatu	3 September 2007	Solomon Islands	
Pasi Schwalger	GK	4	0	25 August 2007	Vanuatu	3 September 2007	Solomon Islands	
Fauivi Ugapo	3	4	0	25 August 2007	Vanuatu	3 September 2007	Solomon Islands	
Horst Petana	GK	4	0	27 August 2007	American Samoa	18 August 2011	Fiji	
Max Tom Hoeflich	FW	4	0	3 September 2007	Solomon Islands	24 November 2011	Tonga	
Lawrie Pio	DF	4	0	2 September 2015	Cook Islands	18 July 2019	Vanuatu	
Henry Pupi	DF	4	0	4 September 2015	Tonga	5 June 2016	Papua New Guinea	
Dominic Gabriel	DF	3	1	7 April 2001	Tonga	11 April 2001	Fiji	
Sale Sua-Mili	FW	3	0	7 April 2001	Tonga	16 April 2001	Australia	
Etena Tokuma	MF	3	0	7 April 2001	Tonga	11 April 2001	Fiji	
Pitotua Aloese	FW	3	0	9 March 2002	Tonga	16 March 2002	Papua New Guinea	
Chris Cahill	MF	3	2	25 August 2007	Vanuatu	29 August 2007	Tonga	
Albert Bell	DF	3	2	18 August 2011	Fiji	24 November 2011	Tonga	
Jared Curtis	MF	3	0	22 November 2011	Cook Islands	26 November 2011	American Samoa	
Shaun Easthope	MF	3	1	22 November 2011	Cook Islands	26 November 2011	American Samoa	
Luki Gosche	FW	3	2	22 November 2011	Cook Islands	1 June 2012	Tahiti	
Masei Amosa	DF	3	0	1 June 2012	Tahiti	5 June 2012	New Caledonia	
Amilale Esaroma	FW	3	0	1 June 2012	Tahiti	5 June 2012	New Caledonia	
Sopo Fakaua	MF	3	0	1 June 2012	Tahiti	5 June 2012	New Caledonia	
Spencer Keli	FW	3	0	1 June 2012	Tahiti	5 June 2012	New Caledonia	
Sapati Umutaua	DF	3	0	1 June 2012	Tahiti	5 June 2012	New Caledonia	
Vito Laloata	DF	3	0	4 September 2015	Tonga	18 July 2019	Vanuatu	
Paulo Scanlan	MF	3	0	29 May 2016	Tahiti	5 June 2016	Papua New Guinea	
Keone Kapisi	MF	3	0	1 June 2016	New Caledonia	8 July 2019	Papua New Guinea	
George Konusi	MF	3	0	8 July 2019	Papua New Guinea	18 July 2019	Vanuatu	
Willie Sauiluma	MF	3	0	8 July 2019	Papua New Guinea	18 July 2019	Vanuatu	
Tauati Tanoa'i	DF	3	0	8 July 2019	Papua New Guinea	18 July 2019	Vanuatu	
Raymond Ah Tune	MF	2	0	7 November 1987	New Zealand	13 November 1987	New Zealand	
Faamanu Etuale	DF	2	0	7 November 1987	New Zealand	13 November 1987	New Zealand	
Pasikale Faogali	MF	2	0	7 November 1987	New Zealand	13 November 1987	New Zealand	
Lafaele Mano	DF	2	0	7 November 1987	New Zealand	13 November 1987	New Zealand	
Happy Patu	FW	2	0	7 November 1987	New Zealand	13 November 1987	New Zealand	
Gustav Slade	MF	2	0	7 November 1987	New Zealand	13 November 1987	New Zealand	
Koro Sofara	DF	2	0	7 November 1987	New Zealand	13 November 1987	New Zealand	
Pelepesite Talapusi	DF	2	0	7 November 1987	New Zealand	13 November 1987	New Zealand	
Malo Vaga	FW	2	0	13 November 1987	New Zealand	2 March 1988	Chinese Taipei	
Iamafana Akerei	GK	2	0	13 November 1996	Cook Islands	15 November 1996	Tonga	
Yiu Hing	DF	2	0	13 November 1996	Cook Islands	15 November 1996	Tonga	
Faafetai Hunt	DF	2	0	13 November 1996	Cook Islands	15 November 1996	Tonga	
Faala Isara	MF	2	0	13 November 1996	Cook Islands	15 November 1996	Tonga	
Anomanmn Lolo	DF	2	0	13 November 1996	Cook Islands	15 November 1996	Tonga	
Petaveng Mamea	MF	2	0	13 November 1996	Cook Islands	15 November 1996	Tonga	
Falevi Petana	GK	2	0	13 November 1996	Cook Islands	15 November 1996	Tonga	
Felise Seia	MF	2	0	13 November 1996	Cook Islands	15 November 1996	Tonga	
T. Tapunu'u	FW	2	1	13 November 1996	Cook Islands	15 November 1996	Tonga	
Pelco Togi	DF	2	0	13 November 1996	Cook Islands	15 November 1996	Tonga	
Etisone Vazmoso	MF	2	0	13 November 1996	Cook Islands	15 November 1996	Tonga	
Luciano Williams	DF	2	0	13 November 1996	Cook Islands	15 November 1996	Tonga	
Rudolph Lilomaiava	MF	2	0	7 April 2001	Tonga	16 April 2001	Australia	
Jerome Taua	DF	2	0	9 March 2002	Tonga	17 May 2004	Fiji	
Lene Epa	FW	2	0	10 May 2004	American Samoa	19 May 2004	Papua New Guinea	
Fatuvalu Numia	GK	2	0	10 May 2004	American Samoa	19 May 2004	Papua New Guinea	
Afasene Tusitala	FW	2	0	10 May 2004	American Samoa	17 May 2004	Fiji	
Sio Togamoa	DF	2	0	15 May 2004	Vanuatu	17 May 2004	Fiji	
Otto Hunt	DF	2	0	17 May 2004	Fiji	19 May 2004	Papua New Guinea	
Iosefo Ioane	MF	2	0	17 May 2004	Fiji	19 May 2004	Papua New Guinea	
Voa Sauaga	DF	2	0	29 August 2007	Tonga	3 September 2007	Solomon Islands	
Jarrell Atimalala		2	0	17 August 2011	Fiji	18 August 2011	Fiji	
Motu Hafoka	GK	2	0	1 June 2012	Tahiti	5 June 2012	New Caledonia	
Patrick Asiata	MF	2	0	3 June 2012	Vanuatu	5 June 2012	New Caledonia	
Marcus Alimonti	DF	2	0	29 May 2016	Tahiti	5 June 2016	Papua New Guinea	
Samuelu Malo	MF	2	0	29 May 2016	Tahiti	1 June 2016	New Caledonia	
Ryan Martin	MF	2	0	29 May 2016	Tahiti	1 June 2016	New Caledonia	
Kevin Daniells	DF	2	0	8 July 2019	Papua New Guinea	18 July 2019	Vanuatu	
Va'a Taualai	MF	2	0	8 July 2019	Papua New Guinea	12 July 2019	Tonga	
Ritchievoy Ueligitone	MF	2	0	8 July 2019	Papua New Guinea	18 July 2019	Vanuatu	
Sean Atherton	DF	2	0	12 July 2019	Tonga	18 July 2019	Vanuatu	
Jarvis Filimalae	MF	2	0	12 July 2019	Tonga	18 July 2019	Vanuatu	
Jerry Epa		1	0	7 November 1987	New Zealand	7 November 1987	New Zealand	
Toco Mara	FW	1	0	7 November 1987	New Zealand	7 November 1987	New Zealand	
Lene Talaapitaga		1	0	7 November 1987	New Zealand	7 November 1987	New Zealand	
Fadevi Umutaua	MF	1	0	7 November 1987	New Zealand	7 November 1987	New Zealand	
Reggie Kwan		1	0	13 November 1987	New Zealand	13 November 1987	New Zealand	
Opeta Siilata	MF	1	0	13 November 1987	New Zealand	13 November 1987	New Zealand	
Soata Utai	MF	1	0	13 November 1987	New Zealand	13 November 1987	New Zealand	
Tavita Samania	GK	1	0	2 March 1988	Chinese Taipei	2 March 1988	Chinese Taipei	
Iopu Maliko	DF	1	0	15 November 1996	Tonga	15 November 1996	Tonga	
Maletino Michael	MF	1	0	7 April 2001	Tonga	7 April 2001	Tonga	
Migao Lauano	MF	1	0	9 April 2001	American Samoa	9 April 2001	American Samoa	
Maio Iaone		1	0	14 March 2002	American Samoa	14 March 2002	American Samoa	
Pili Fuimaona		1	0	16 March 2002	Papua New Guinea	16 March 2002	Papua New Guinea	
Vili Lafaele		1	0	16 March 2002	Papua New Guinea	16 March 2002	Papua New Guinea	
Junior Reid	FW	1	0	16 March 2002	Papua New Guinea	16 March 2002	Papua New Guinea	
Ricky Slade	FW	1	0	18 March 2002	New Caledonia	18 March 2002	New Caledonia	
Filipo Uli	GK	1	0	27 August 2007	American Samoa	27 August 2007	American Samoa	
Fauivi Malu		1	0	18 August 2011	Fiji	18 August 2011	Fiji	
Peni Kitiona	DF	1	0	3 June 2012	Vanuatu	3 June 2012	Vanuatu	
Suivai Ataga	FW	1	0	3 June 2012	Vanuatu	3 June 2012	Vanuatu	
Ethan Hanns	GK	1	0	3 June 2012	Vanuatu	3 June 2012	Vanuatu	
Aukusitino Aitupe	GK	1	0	5 June 2012	New Caledonia	5 June 2012	New Caledonia	
Tamoto Fenika	DF	1	0	5 June 2012	New Caledonia	5 June 2012	New Caledonia	
Key Viliamu	DF	1	0	31 August 2015	American Samoa	31 August 2015	American Samoa	
Benson Hunt	FW	1	0	2 September 2015	Cook Islands	2 September 2015	Cook Islands	
Elvis Roebeck	DF	1	0	2 September 2015	Cook Islands	2 September 2015	Cook Islands	
Isaia Fealofi	MF	1	0	4 September 2015	Tonga	4 September 2015	Tonga	
Ted Losi	GK	1	0	5 June 2016	Papua New Guinea	5 June 2016	Papua New Guinea	
Thomas Konusi	FW	1	0	12 July 2019	Tonga	12 July 2019	Tonga	
Darren Talilai	FW	1	0	12 July 2019	Tonga	12 July 2019	Tonga	
Harlen Russell	DF	1	0	18 July 2019	Vanuatu	18 July 2019	Vanuatu	
