= Samoa national football team results =

The Samoa national football team represents Samoa in association football and is controlled by the Football Federation Samoa (FFS), the governing body of the sport in the territory. It played its first match as Samoa at the 1998 Polynesia Cup – a 2–1 loss to the Cook Islands.

From a total of 57 matches, Samoa has won 21, drawn two and lost 34, scoring 93 goals and conceding 170. The majority of its matches have been played at neutral venues and the team has never played a home match. Prior to 4 July 1997, when the government of Western Samoa legislated to change the country's name to Samoa, the national team played 21 matches as Western Samoa. Its combined record is 78 matches played, 24 won, four drawn and 50 lost, scoring 112 and conceding 280.

After going unbeaten in the first round of qualification for the 2014 FIFA World Cup, Samoa qualified for the 2012 OFC Nations Cup - the first time the nation was represented at the competition. They were eliminated in the group stages after losing all three of their matches. They followed that up by qualifying for the 2016 OFC Nations Cup but were again eliminated in the group stages after losing all three matches.

As a result of the COVID-19 pandemic, Samoa withdrew from qualification for the 2022 FIFA World Cup. Samoa subsequntly qualified for the 2024 OFC Men's Nations Cup, their third successive finals. However, they again lost all three of their group stage matches.

Desmond Fa'aiuaso is Samoa's top goalscorer. After scoring against American Samoa during qualififcation for the 2018 FIFA World Cup, Fa'aiuaso has scored a total of nine goals in 20 caps between 2001 and 2016.

== Key ==
Key to matches

- Att. = Match attendance
- (H) = Home ground
- (A) = Away ground
- (N) = Neutral ground

Key to record by opponent

- Pld = Games played
- W = Games won
- D = Games drawn
- L = Games lost
- GF = Goals for
- GA = Goals against

== Results ==
Samoa's score is shown first in each case.

No.	Date	Venue	Opponents	Score	Competition	Samoa scorers	Att.	Ref.
22	2 September 1998	Rarotonga (N)	Cook Islands	1–2	1998 Polynesia Cup	Unknown	—	
23	5 September 1998	Rarotonga (N)	Tahiti	1–5	1998 Polynesia Cup	Unknown	—	
24	7 September 1998	Rarotonga (N)	Tonga	2–0	1998 Polynesia Cup	Unknown	—	
25	8 September 1998	Rarotonga (N)	American Samoa	4–0	1998 Polynesia Cup	Unknown	—	
26	6 June 2000	Paranuu Stadium, Papeete (N)	Tonga	4–0	2000 Polynesia Cup	Unknown	—	
27	8 June 2000	Paranuu Stadium, Papeete (N)	Tahiti	1–2	2000 Polynesia Cup	Unknown	—	
28	12 June 2000	Paranuu Stadium, Papeete (N)	American Samoa	6–1	2000 Polynesia Cup	Unknown	—	
29	14 June 2000	Paranuu Stadium, Papeete (N)	Cook Islands	2–3	2000 Polynesia Cup	Unknown	—	
30	7 April 2001	International Stadium, Coffs Harbour (N)	Tonga	0–1	2002 FIFA World Cup qualification		500	
31	9 April 2001	International Stadium, Coffs Harbour (N)	American Samoa	8–0	2002 FIFA World Cup qualification	Leututu (o.g.), Gabriel, Faaisuaso (4), Lemana, Michael	200	
32	11 April 2001	International Stadium, Coffs Harbour (N)	Fiji	1–6	2002 FIFA World Cup qualification	Lemana	400	
33	16 April 2001	International Stadium, Coffs Harbour (N)	Australia	0–11	2002 FIFA World Cup qualification		2,000	
34	9 March 2002	Toleofoa Joseph Blatter Soccer Complex, Apia (N)	Tonga	2–0	2002 OFC Nations Cup qualification	Timo, Lemana	—	
35	14 March 2002	Toleofoa Joseph Blatter Soccer Complex, Apia (N)	American Samoa	5–0	2002 OFC Nations Cup qualification	Timo, Faaiuaso (2), Lemana, Fasavalu	—	
36	16 March 2002	Toleofoa Joseph Blatter Soccer Complex, Apia (N)	Papua New Guinea	1–4	2002 OFC Nations Cup qualification	Lemana	—	
37	18 March 2002	Toleofoa Joseph Blatter Soccer Complex, Apia (N)	New Caledonia	0–5	2002 OFC Nations Cup qualification		—	
38	5 May 2004	New Zealand (N)	Cook Islands	0–0	Friendly		—	
39	10 May 2004	Toleofoa Joseph Blatter Soccer Complex, Apia (N)	American Samoa	4–0	2006 FIFA World Cup qualification	Bryce, Fasavalu (2), Michael	500	
40	15 May 2004	Toleofoa Joseph Blatter Soccer Complex, Apia (N)	Vanuatu	0–3	2006 FIFA World Cup qualification		650	
41	17 May 2004	Toleofoa Joseph Blatter Soccer Complex, Apia (N)	Fiji	0–4	2006 FIFA World Cup qualification		450	
42	19 May 2004	Toleofoa Joseph Blatter Soccer Complex, Apia (N)	Papua New Guinea	1–4	2006 FIFA World Cup qualification	Michael	300	
43	25 August 2007	Toleofoa Joseph Blatter Soccer Complex, Apia (N)	Vanuatu	0–4	2007 South Pacific Games		300	
44	27 August 2007	Toleofoa Joseph Blatter Soccer Complex, Apia (N)	American Samoa	7–0	2007 South Pacific Games	Tumua (2), Faaiuaso, Cahill (2), Fonoti, Michael	2,800	
45	29 August 2007	Toleofoa Joseph Blatter Soccer Complex, Apia (N)	Tonga	2–1	2007 South Pacific Games	Faaiuaso, Taylor	1,850	
46	3 September 2007	Toleofoa Joseph Blatter Soccer Complex, Apia (N)	Solomon Islands	0–3	2007 South Pacific Games		200	
47	17 August 2011	Ratu Cakobau Park, Nausori (A)	Fiji	0–3	Friendly		—	
48	18 August 2011	National Stadium, Suva (A)	Fiji	1–5	Friendly	Unknown	—	
49	22 August 2011	Fiji (N)	Tuvalu	0–3	Friendly		—	
50	22 November 2011	National Soccer Stadium, Apia (N)	Cook Islands	3–2	2014 FIFA World Cup qualification	Gosche (2), Bell	600	
51	24 November 2011	National Soccer Stadium, Apia (N)	Tonga	1–1	2014 FIFA World Cup qualification	Easthope	180	
52	26 November 2011	National Soccer Stadium, Apia (N)	American Samoa	1–0	2014 FIFA World Cup qualification	Malo	800	
53	1 June 2012	Lawson Tama Stadium, Honiara (N)	Tahiti	1–10	2012 OFC Nations Cup	Malo	3,000	
54	3 June 2012	Lawson Tama Stadium, Honiara (N)	Vanuatu	0–5	2012 OFC Nations Cup		2,200	
55	5 June 2012	Lawson Tama Stadium, Honiara (N)	New Caledonia	0–9	2012 OFC Nations Cup		1,000	
56	31 August 2015	Loto-Tonga Soka Centre (Field 1), Nuku'alofa (N)	American Samoa	3–2	2018 FIFA World Cup qualification	Fa'aiuaso, Hamilton-Pama, Mobberley	100	
57	2 September 2015	Loto-Tonga Soka Centre (Field 1), Nuku'alofa (N)	Cook Islands	0–1	2018 FIFA World Cup qualification		200	
58	4 September 2015	Loto-Tonga Soka Centre (Field 2), Nuku'alofa (N)	Tonga	3–0	2018 FIFA World Cup qualification	Mobberley, Hall (2)	250	
59	29 May 2016	Sir John Guise Stadium, Port Moresby (N)	Tahiti	0–4	2016 OFC Nations Cup		4,720	
60	1 June 2016	Sir John Guise Stadium, Port Moresby (N)	New Caledonia	0–7	2016 OFC Nations Cup		2,015	
61	5 June 2016	Sir John Guise Stadium, Port Moresby (N)	Papua New Guinea	0–8	2016 OFC Nations Cup		2,678	
62	8 July 2019	National Soccer Stadium, Apia (N)	Papua New Guinea	0–6	2019 Pacific Games		1,000	
63	12 July 2019	National Soccer Stadium, Apia (N)	Tonga	2–0	2019 Pacific Games	Laloata (2)	1,200	
64	18 July 2019	National Soccer Stadium, Apia (N)	Vanuatu	0–11	2019 Pacific Games		500	
65	17 November 2023	Lawson Tama Stadium, Honiara (N)	Solomon Islands	0–1	2023 Pacific Games		—	
66	20 November 2023	Lawson Tama Stadium, Honiara (N)	American Samoa	10–0	2023 Pacific Games	Kwan (2), Tumua Leo (5), Trainor, Tumua, Taualai	—	
67	27 November 2023	SIFF Academy Field, Honiara (N)	Tahiti	1–2	2023 Pacific Games	Tumua	—	
68	30 November 2023	SIFF Academy Field, Honiara (N)	Cook Islands	3–0 (awarded)	2023 Pacific Games		—	
69	20 March 2024	Teufaiva Stadium, Nuku'alofa (N)	Tonga	4–1	2024 OFC Nations Cup qualification	Tumua, Viliamu (2), Stowers	500	
70	23 March 2024	Teufaiva Stadium, Nuku'alofa (N)	Cook Islands	1–0	2024 OFC Nations Cup qualification	Taualai	300	
71	16 June 2024	National Stadium, Suva (N)	Tahiti	0–2	2024 OFC Nations Cup		500	
72	19 June 2024	National Stadium, Suva (N)	Fiji	1–9	2024 OFC Nations Cup	Salisbury	1,300	
73	22 June 2024	National Stadium, Suva (N)	Papua New Guinea	1–2	2024 OFC Nations Cup	Trainor	500	
74	6 September 2024	National Soccer Stadium, Apia (N)	American Samoa	2–0	2026 FIFA World Cup qualification	Tumua, Vaai	600	
75	9 September 2024	National Soccer Stadium, Apia (N)	Tonga	2–1 (a.e.t.)	2026 FIFA World Cup qualification	Salisbury, Faamatau	500	
76	12 October 2024	VFF Freshwater Stadium, Port Vila (N)	Vanuatu	1–4	2026 FIFA World Cup qualification	Viliamu	3,000	
77	15 November 2024	Waikato Stadium, Hamilton (N)	Tahiti	0–3	2026 FIFA World Cup qualification		638	
78	18 November 2024	Mount Smart Stadium, Auckland (N)	New Zealand	0–8	2026 FIFA World Cup qualification		5,327	

Notes

1. A: The 1998 Polynesia Cup doubled as qualifiers for the 1998 OFC Nations Cup.
2. B: The 2000 Polynesia Cup doubled as qualifiers for the 2000 OFC Nations Cup.
3. C: The first round of Oceanian qualifiers for the 2006 FIFA World Cup doubled as qualifiers for the 2004 OFC Nations Cup.
4. D: The men's football tournament at the 2007 South Pacific Games doubled as qualifiers for the 2008 OFC Nations Cup and the first round of qualifiers for the 2010 FIFA World Cup.
5. E: The Oceanian qualifiers for the 2014 FIFA World Cup doubled as qualifiers for the 2012 OFC Nations Cup.
6. F: The 2012 OFC Nations Cup doubled as the second round of qualifiers for the 2014 FIFA World Cup.
7. G: The Oceanian qualifiers for the 2018 FIFA World Cup doubled as qualifiers for the 2016 OFC Nations Cup.
8. H: The 2016 OFC Nations Cup doubled as the second round of qualifiers for the 2018 FIFA World Cup.
9. I: Cook Islands forfeited.

== Record by opponent ==
Team	Pld	W	D	L	GF	GA	GD	WPCT
American Samoa	10	10	0	0	50	3	+47	100.00
Australia	1	0	0	1	0	11	−11	0.00
Cook Islands	7	3	1	3	10	8	+2	42.86
Fiji	5	0	0	5	3	27	−24	0.00
New Caledonia	3	0	0	3	0	21	−21	0.00
New Zealand	1	0	0	1	0	8	−8	0.00
Papua New Guinea	5	0	0	5	3	25	−22	0.00
Solomon Islands	2	0	0	2	0	4	−4	0.00
Tahiti	7	0	0	7	4	28	−24	0.00
Tonga	10	8	1	1	22	5	+17	80.00
Tuvalu	1	0	0	1	0	3	−3	0.00
Vanuatu	5	0	0	5	1	27	−26	0.00
Total	57	21	2	34	93	170	−77	36.84

Source: Results
