= Andrew Setefano =

Samoan footballer (born 1987)

Personal information
- Full name: Andrew Setefano
- Date of birth: August 10, 1987 (age 39)
- Position: Defender

Senior career*
Years	Team	Apps	(Gls)
2012	Goldstar Sogi		
2013–2014	Vailima Kiwi		
2015–2018	Lupe o le Soaga		
2019	Vailima Kiwi		
2020–2022	Lupe o le Soaga		
2023–2025	Vaipuna SC		
2026–	Pago Youth		

International career^{‡}
2011–	Samoa	28	(0)
- * Club domestic league appearances and goals ‡ National team caps and goals as of 31 January 2026

Andrew Setefano (born 10 August 1987) is a Samoan professional footballer who plays as a defender. He has been a member of the Samoa national football team since 2011.

Setefano is from Moamoa-fou, Satuimalufilufi and Vaito'omuli. He has played football for Upper Hutt City FC in New Zealand, Hekari United F.C. in Papua New Guinea, Goldstar Sogi FC, Vailima Kiwi FC, and Lupe o le Soaga in Samoa.

In 2017 he was captain of Lupe o le Soaga. He played for Vailima Kiwi FC in the 2019 OFC Champions League, and was suspended during the opening match. He captained Lupe o le Soaga in the 2020 OFC Champions League.

Setefano was selected for a Samoan team to play against Papakura City FC in 2009. He captained the Samoa national football team in the 2012 OFC Nations Cup. In June 2019 he was named to the squad for the 2019 Pacific Games.
