= Kevin Daniells =

Samoan footballer

Personal information
- Date of birth: 19 May 1999 (age 27)
- Height: 1.88 m (6 ft 2 in)
- Position: Defender

Youth career
- 2014–2016: Innisfail United

Senior career*
Years	Team	Apps	(Gls)
2016–2018	Innisfall United	13	(0)

International career^{‡}
2019–	Samoa	3	(0)
- * Club domestic league appearances and goals as of 21 October 2020 ‡ National team caps and goals as of 21 October 2020

Kevin Daniells (born 19 May 1999) is an Australian-born Samoan footballer who plays as a defender for the Samoa national football team and Innisfail United. He is the brother of Samoan woman's footballer Matalena Daniells.

Daniells is based in Brisbane, Australia.

In June 2019 he was named to the squad for the 2019 Pacific Games.
