= Ryan Martin (footballer) =

Samoan footballer (born 1993)

Personal information
- Date of birth: 4 September 1993 (age 33)
- Place of birth: Samoa
- Position: Right winger

Team information
- Current team: Onehunga Sports

Youth career
- Hawke's Bay United

Senior career*
Years	Team	Apps	(Gls)
2010–2011	Hawke's Bay United		
2011–	Onehunga Sports		

International career^{‡}
2016–	Samoa	2	(0)
- * Club domestic league appearances and goals as of 28 June 2016 ‡ National team caps and goals as of 28 June 2016

Ryan Martin (born 4 September 1993) is a Samoan footballer who plays as a midfielder for Hawke's Bay United FC in the New Zealand Football Championship.

He was selected for the Samoan team for the 2016 OFC Nations Cup.
