= 2018 FIFA World Cup qualification – OFC first round =

Football tournament qualification stage

The first round of OFC matches for 2018 FIFA World Cup qualification (and 2016 OFC Nations Cup qualification) was played from 31 August to 4 September 2015 in Tonga.

== Format ==
In this round, four teams, as determined by the OFC in March 2014, played a single round-robin tournament held in a single country which was later decided to be in Tonga. All matches were held at the Loto-Tonga Soka Centre in Nuku'alofa.

Samoa, the winner, advanced to the 2016 OFC Nations Cup, held from 28 May – 12 June 2016, to join the other seven teams which received a bye into the group stage. The winner of the OFC Nations Cup, New Zealand, represented the OFC at the 2017 FIFA Confederations Cup. Moreover, the OFC Nations Cup served as the second round of qualifying for the 2018 FIFA World Cup in Russia, with the top six teams advancing to the third round of FIFA World Cup qualifying.

== Participating teams ==
In April 2014 the OFC announced its executive's decision on the teams to compete in the tournament. The four lowest ranked teams (based on FIFA World Ranking and sporting reasons) among the 11 OFC entrants entered the first round:

Note: Bolded team qualified for the 2016 OFC Nations Cup.

Team	FIFA ranking at start of event
American Samoa	200
Cook Islands	206
**Samoa**	197
Tonga	198

== Venue ==
All matches were held at the Loto-Tonga Soka Centre in Nuku'alofa

Tonga
‘Atele
Loto-Tonga Soka Centre
Capacity: **1,500**

== Standings ==
2018 FIFA World Cup qualification tiebreakers
In league format, the ranking of teams in each group was based on the following criteria (regulations Articles 20.6 and 20.7):
1. Points (3 points for a win, 1 point for a draw, 0 points for a loss)
2. Overall goal difference
3. Overall goals scored
4. Points in matches between tied teams
5. Goal difference in matches between tied teams
6. Goals scored in matches between tied teams
7. Away goals scored in matches between tied teams (if the tie was only between two teams in home-and-away league format)
8. Fair play points
  - first yellow card: minus 1 point
  - indirect red card (second yellow card): minus 3 points
  - direct red card: minus 4 points
  - yellow card and direct red card: minus 5 points
9. Drawing of lots by the FIFA Organising Committee

Pos	Team	Pld	W	D	L	GF	GA	GD	Pts	Qualification	Samoa	American Samoa	Cook Islands	Tonga
1	Samoa	3	2	0	1	6	3	+3	**6**	Advance to 2016 OFC Nations Cup and second round	—	3–2	—	—
2	American Samoa	3	2	0	1	6	4	+2	**6**		—	—	2–0	2–1
3	Cook Islands	3	2	0	1	4	2	+2	**6**		1–0	—	—	3–0
4	Tonga (H)	3	0	0	3	1	8	−7	**0**		0–3	—	—	—

Source: FIFA
Rules for classification: Qualification tiebreakers
(H) Hosts

== Matches ==
The match schedule was revealed on 30 July 2015, following a draw held at OFC Headquarters in Auckland, New Zealand. All times are local, UTC+13.

31 August 2015
13:00

Cook Islands	3–0	Tonga
Saghabi 38', 53', 59'	Report (FIFA); Report (OFC)

Loto-Tonga Soka Centre (Field 1), ‘Atele
Attendance: 300
Referee: Ravitesh Behari (Fiji)
31 August 2015
15:30

Samoa	3–2	American Samoa
Fa'aiuaso 4'; Hamilton-Pama 18'; Mobberley 26'	Report (FIFA); Report (OFC)	Beauchamp 38', 86'

Loto-Tonga Soka Centre (Field 1), ‘Atele
Attendance: 100
Referee: Nelson Sogo (Solomon Islands)

2 September 2015
13:00

Cook Islands	1–0	Samoa
Saghabi 39'	Report (FIFA); Report (OFC)

Loto-Tonga Soka Centre (Field 1), ‘Atele
Attendance: 150
Referee: Robinson Banga (Vanuatu)
2 September 2015
15:30

American Samoa	2–1	Tonga
Manao 49'; Ott 51'	Report (FIFA); Report (OFC)	Uhatahi 47'

Loto-Tonga Soka Centre (Field 1), ‘Atele
Attendance: 200
Referee: Salesh Chand (Fiji)

4 September 2015
13:00 (Note: The final round matches were originally scheduled to be played simultaneously at 15:00, but were changed by the OFC to be played consecutively one day before the matches.)

Tonga	0–3	Samoa
	Report (FIFA); Report (OFC)	Mobberley 9'; Hall 22', 77'

Loto-Tonga Soka Centre (Field 2), ‘Atele
Attendance: 250
Referee: Averii Jacques (Tahiti)
4 September 2015
15:30

American Samoa	2–0	Cook Islands
Mitchell 57'; Manao 67'	Report (FIFA); Report (OFC)

Loto-Tonga Soka Centre (Field 1), ‘Atele
Attendance: 250
Referee: Ravitesh Behari (Fiji)

== Goalscorers ==
There were 17 goals scored in 6 matches, for an average of 2.83 goals per match.

4 goals

- (Cook Islands) Taylor Saghabi

2 goals

- (American Samoa) Demetrius Beauchamp
- (American Samoa) Justin Manao
- (Samoa) Johnny Hall
- (Samoa) Andrew Mobberley

1 goal

- (American Samoa) Ali'i Mitchell
- (American Samoa) Ramin Ott
- (Samoa) Desmond Fa'aiuaso
- (Samoa) Faitalia Hamilton-Pama
- (Tonga) Sione Uhatahi
