= Falevi Umutaua =

Samoan professional football manager

Personal information
- Place of birth: Samoa

Managerial career
- Years: Team
- 2007: Samoa

Falevi Umutaua is a Samoan professional football manager.

== Career ==
In 2007, he coached the Samoa national football team.
