= Motu Hafoka =

Samoan footballer

Personal information
- Full name: Motu Hafoka
- Date of birth: 13 March 1987
- Date of death: 30 June 2012 (aged 25)
- Place of death: Matautu-uta, Apia
- Position: Goalkeeper

International career^{‡}
Years	Team	Apps	(Gls)
2012	Samoa	2	(0)
- ‡ National team caps and goals as of 10 March 2013

Motu Hafoka (13 March 1987 – 30 June 2012) was a Samoan footballer who played as a goalkeeper. He represented Samoa in the 2012 OFC Nations Cup and in the 2007 OFC U-20 Championship.

He committed suicide by hanging himself from a tree in his family's back yard on Saturday, 30 June 2012. It is believed that "differences with his family" were the cause of the suicide.
