= Scott Easthope =

New Zealand association football manager (born 1985)

Personal information
- Date of birth: 15 October 1985 (age 41)
- Place of birth: New Zealand

Team information
- Current team: Samoa

Managerial career
- Years: Team
- 2016–2020: Samoa

Scott Easthope (born 15 October 1985) is a New Zealand football manager who managed the Samoa national team.

== Managerial statistics ==
As of Match played 5 June 2016

Team	From	To	Record				
Team	From	To	G	W	D	L	Win %
Samoa	2016	2020	3	0	0	3	0.00
