= Thomas Konusi =

Samoan footballer

Personal information
- Date of birth: 11 June 1996 (age 30)
- Height: 1.71 m (5 ft 7 in)
- Position: Forward

Team information
- Current team: Mount Albert-Ponsonby

Senior career*
Years	Team	Apps	(Gls)
2019–	Mount Albert-Ponsonby		

International career^{‡}
2019–	Samoa	2	(0)
- * Club domestic league appearances and goals ‡ National team caps and goals as of 18 July 2019

Thomas Konusi (born 11 June 1996), is a Samoan international footballer who plays as a forward for Mount Albert-Ponsonby. He is the son of Victor Lagi who played for the Fiji national squad

Konusi was educated at Saint Kentigern College in Auckland, New Zealand. After playing soccer at school he moved on to play for Three Kings United in the 2015/16 season. In December 2015 he was found to have been ineligible to play, resulting in the results of eight matches being overturned.

In June 2019 he was named to the Samoa national football team for the 2019 Pacific Games.

== International statistics ==
As of 3 March 2020

National team	Year	Apps	Goals
Samoa	2019	1	0
Total		1	0
