= Andrew Mobberley =

Samoan footballer

Andrew Mobberly
Personal information
- Full name: Andrew Mobberly
- Date of birth: 10 March 1992 (age 34)
- Place of birth: Auckland, New Zealand
- Height: 1.67 m (5 ft 6 in)
- Position: Forward

Team information
- Current team: East Coast Bays

Senior career*
Years	Team	Apps	(Gls)
–2015	Queenstown Rovers		
2015–2016	Southern United	3	(1)
2016–2017	East Coast Bays		
2018–2021	Albany United		
2021	Greenhithe Catimba		

International career^{‡}
2015–	Samoa	10	(2)
- * Club domestic league appearances and goals as of 1 June 2016 ‡ National team caps and goals as of 18 July 2019

Andrew Forbes Mobberly (born 10 March 1992) is a Samoan footballer who plays as a forward for Greenhithe Catimba and the Samoa national football team.

Mobberly was born in Auckland, New Zealand. He has previously played for Queenstown Rovers, Southern United, East Coast Bays, and Albany United. In 2022 he is coaching Albany United.

== Career ==
He was first selected for the Samoa national football team in 2015 for its 2018 world cup qualifier campaign. He was subsequently selected for the team for the 2016 OFC Nations Cup. In June 2019 he was named to the squad for the 2019 Pacific Games.

=== International goals ===
Scores and results list Samoa's goal tally first.

No	Date	Venue	Opponent	Score	Result	Competition
1.	31 August 2015	Loto-Tonga Soka Centre, Nuku'alofa, Tonga	American Samoa	2–0	3–1	2018 FIFA World Cup qualification
2.	4 September 2015	Loto-Tonga Soka Centre, Nuku'Alofa, Tonga	Tonga	1–0	3–0	2018 FIFA World Cup qualification
