= Vaalii Faalogo =

Samoan footballer

Personal information
- Full name: Vaalii Faalogo
- Date of birth: November 9, 1983 (age 42)
- Position: Defender

Team information
- Current team: Lupe ole Soaga
- Number: 2

Senior career*
Years	Team	Apps	(Gls)
2010–2017	Kiwi FC		
2017–	Lupe ole Soaga		

International career^{‡}
2011–	Samoa	6	(0)
- * Club domestic league appearances and goals ‡ National team caps and goals as of 10 March 2013

Vaalii Faalogo is a Samoan footballer who plays as a defender. In 2017 he was part of Lupe ole Soaga's team for the OFC Champions League. In 2018 he was the team's captain. In 2020 he was the team's assistant coach.
