= Johnny Hall (Samoan footballer) =

Samoan association football player (born 1991)

Personal information
- Full name: Johnny Terence Hall
- Date of birth: 16 February 1991 (age 35)
- Place of birth: Sydney, Australia
- Position: Defender

Youth career
- Manly United

Senior career*
Years	Team	Apps	(Gls)
- Brookvale FC

International career
2015–	Samoa	6	(2)
- * Club domestic league appearances and goals

Johnny Terence Hall (born 16 February 1991) is a Samoan association football player who plays primarily as a defender for Brookvale FC in the Manly-Warringah Premier League.

== Club career ==
Hall grew up playing for Manly United since the age of nine. He currently plays for Brookvale FC

== International career ==
On 31 August 2015, Hall made his senior international debut for Samoa in a 3–2 win against American Samoa, in the First round of OFC matches for 2018 FIFA World Cup qualification which doubles as qualification for the 2016 OFC Nations Cup. On 4 September 2015, Hall scored his first senior international goal, followed by a second goal in Samoa's 3–0 victory over Tonga. He was selected for the Samoan team for the 2016 OFC nations cup.

=== International goals ===
Scores and results list Samoa's goal tally first.

No	Date	Venue	Opponent	Score	Result	Competition
1.	4 September 2015	Loto-Tonga Soka Centre, Nuku'Alofa, Tonga	Tonga	2–0	3–0	2018 FIFA World Cup qualification
2.	4 September 2015	Loto-Tonga Soka Centre, Nuku'Alofa, Tonga	Tonga	3–0	3–0	2018 FIFA World Cup qualification

== Personal life ==
Hall is the cousin of Brisbane Roar FC winger Jai Ingham.
