= Western Samoa national football team results =

The Western Samoa national football team represented Western Samoa in association football and was controlled by Football Federation Samoa (FFS), the governing body of the sport in the country. Before joining the Fédération Internationale de Football Association (FIFA) and the Oceania Football Confederation (OFC), it played its first match at the 1979 South Pacific Games – a 12–0 loss to the Solomon Islands.

From a total of 21 matches, Western Samoa won three (two against the American Samoa and one against the Cook Islands), drawn two and lost 16, scoring 19 goals and conceding 110. The majority of its matches were played at neutral venues and the team only played one home match – a 7–0 loss to New Zealand during qualification for the 1988 Summer Olympics.

After losing their first nine matches consecutively by an aggregate of 66–5, Western Samoa won their first match at the 1983 South Pacific Games 3–1 against American Samoa.

In 1986, FFS joined both FIFA and the OFC and the national team began competing in the qualifying stages of the FIFA World Cup and the OFC Men's Nations Cup. During their first qualifying campaign for the 1998 FIFA World Cup in November 1996, Western Samoa won their first match against the Cook Islands but were eliminated after losing to Tonga.

On 4 July 1997, the government of Western Samoa legislated to change the country's name to Samoa and the name of the national football team was subsequently changed. Since then, the national football team has continued under the new name.

== Key ==
Key to matches

- Att. = Match attendance
- (H) = Home ground
- (A) = Away ground
- (N) = Neutral ground

Key to record by opponent

- Pld = Games played
- W = Games won
- D = Games drawn
- L = Games lost
- GF = Goals for
- GA = Goals against

== Results ==
Western Samoa's score is shown first in each case.

No.	Date	Venue	Opponents	Score	Competition	Western Samoa scorers	Att.	Ref.
1	31 August 1979	Bidesi Park, Suva (N)	Solomon Islands	0–12	1979 South Pacific Games		—	
2	1 September 1979	Ratu Cakobau Park, Nausori (N)	Wallis and Futuna	1–3	1979 South Pacific Games	Unknown	—	
3	5 September 1979	Ratu Cakobau Park, Nausori (N)	Guam	2–4	1979 South Pacific Games	Unknown	—	
4	7 July 1981	Lawson Tama Stadium, Honiara (N)	Vanuatu	1–13	1981 South Pacific Mini Games	Koro	—	
5	8 July 1981	Lawson Tama Stadium, Honiara (N)	Tahiti	0–13	1981 South Pacific Mini Games		—	
6	9 July 1981	Lawson Tama Stadium, Honiara (N)	Papua New Guinea	1–4	1981 South Pacific Mini Games	Tuia	—	
7	10 July 1981	Lawson Tama Stadium, Honiara (N)	Solomon Islands	0–5	1981 South Pacific Mini Games		—	
8	11 July 1981	Lawson Tama Stadium, Honiara (N)	Fiji	0–4	1981 South Pacific Mini Games		—	
9	14 July 1981	Lawson Tama Stadium, Honiara (N)	New Caledonia	0–8	1981 South Pacific Mini Games		—	
10	20 August 1983	Apia (N)	American Samoa	3–1	1983 South Pacific Games	Unknown	—	
11	22 August 1983	Apia (N)	Tonga	3–3	1983 South Pacific Games	Unknown	—	
12	24 August 1983	Apia (N)	Wallis and Futuna	1–2	1983 South Pacific Games	Unknown	—	
13	26 August 1983	Apia (N)	Tahiti	0–2	1983 South Pacific Games		—	
14	7 November 1987	Apia Park, Apia (H)	New Zealand	0–7	1988 Summer Olympics qualification		—	
15	14 November 1987	Western Springs Stadium, Auckland (A)	New Zealand	0–12	1988 Summer Olympics qualification		—	
16	2 March 1988	St George Stadium, Sydney (N)	Chinese Taipei	0–5	1988 Summer Olympics qualification		—	
17	24 November 1994	Western Samoa (N)	American Samoa	3–1	1994 Polynesia Cup	Unknown	—	
18	25 November 1994	Western Samoa (N)	Tonga	2–2	1994 Polynesia Cup	Unknown	—	
19	28 November 1994	Western Samoa (N)	Tahiti	0–7	1994 Polynesia Cup		—	
20	13 November 1996	Nukuʻalofa (N)	Cook Islands	2–1	1998 FIFA World Cup qualification	Tapunuu, Palusami	—	
21	15 November 1996	Nukuʻalofa (N)	Tonga	0–1	1998 FIFA World Cup qualification		—	

Notes

1. Note 1: The 1994 Polynesia Cup doubled as qualifiers for the 1996 OFC Nations Cup.

== Results by opposition ==
Team	Pld	W	D	L	GF	GA	GD	WPCT
American Samoa	2	2	0	0	6	2	+4	100.00
Chinese Taipei	1	0	0	1	0	5	−5	0.00
Cook Islands	1	1	0	0	2	1	+1	100.00
Fiji	1	0	0	1	0	4	−4	0.00
Guam	1	0	0	1	2	4	−2	0.00
New Caledonia	1	0	0	1	0	8	−8	0.00
New Zealand	2	0	0	2	0	19	−19	0.00
Papua New Guinea	1	0	0	1	1	4	−3	0.00
Solomon Islands	2	0	0	2	0	17	−17	0.00
Tahiti	3	0	0	3	0	22	−22	0.00
Tonga	3	0	2	1	5	6	−1	0.00
Vanuatu	1	0	0	1	1	13	−12	0.00
Wallis and Futuna	2	0	0	2	2	5	−3	0.00
Total	21	3	2	16	19	110	−91	14.29

Source: Results
