= Malo Vaga =

Samoan football manager and referee

Personal information
- Date of birth: 12 April 1965 (age 61)
- Place of birth: Samoa

Managerial career
- Years: Team
- 2002–2003: Samoa
- 2012–2014: Samoa

Malo Vaga (born April 12, 1965) is a Samoan professional football manager and referee. From 2002 to 2003 he coached the Samoa national football team. After a nine-year break, he began coaching the Samoa national football team again in January 2012.
