= Bevan Kapisi =

Samoan footballer

Personal information
- Full name: Bevan Kapisi
- Date of birth: 15 August 1981 (age 45)
- Place of birth: Samoa
- Position: Central midfielder

Senior career*
Years	Team	Apps	(Gls)
2002–2003	Vaivase-Tai		
2004–2005	AST Central United		
2006–2007	Otahuhu United		

International career^{‡}
2002–2007	Samoa	4	(0)
- * Club domestic league appearances and goals as of 12 January 2012 ‡ National team caps and goals as of 12 January 2012

Bevan Kapisi (born 15 August 1981) in Samoa is a footballer who plays as a central midfielder. He has played for Vaivase-Tai, AST Central United, Otahuhu United and the Samoa national football team.

In 2004 he was named to the Samoa national football team for the 2004 OFC Nations Cup.
