= 2024 OFC U-16 Men's Championship qualification =

Tournament details
- Host country: Tonga
- Teams: 4 (from 1 confederation)
- Venue: 1 (in 1 host city)

Final positions
- Champions: Solomon Islands
- Runners-up: Tonga
- Third place: Papua New Guinea
- Fourth place: American Samoa

Tournament statistics
- Matches played: 6
- Goals scored: 43 (7.17 per match)
- Attendance: 1,200 (200 per match)
- Top scorer: (Solomon Islands) Ashely Kwaimasia (9 goals)

The qualifying tournament for the 2024 OFC U-16 Men's Championship will be held from 13-19 April.

== Venue ==
Qualifying tournament venues being played in Tonga in one host city in Nuku'alofa.

Tonga
Nuku'alofa
Teufaiva Sport Stadium
Capacity: 10,000
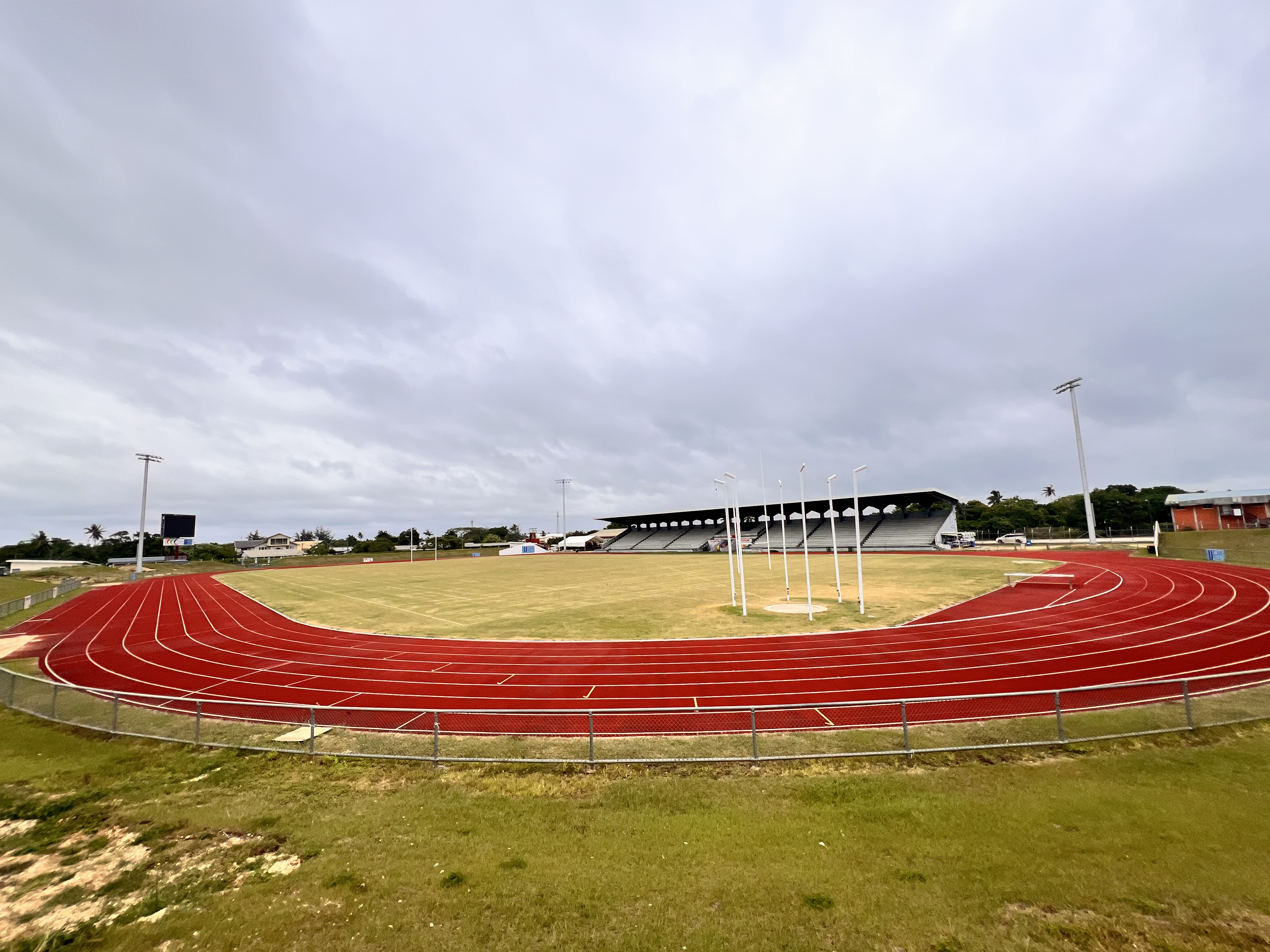

== Group stage ==
The draw for the tournament was held on 5 March 2024.

| Pos | Team | Pld | W | D | L | GF | GA | GD | Pts | Qualification | (Solomon Islands) | (Tonga) | (Papua New Guinea) | (American Samoa) |
|---|---|---|---|---|---|---|---|---|---|---|---|---|---|---|
| 1 | Solomon Islands | 3 | 3 | 0 | 0 | 29 | 0 | +29 | 9 | Qualify for Final tournament | — | — | — | 6–0 |
| 2 | Tonga (H) | 3 | 2 | 0 | 1 | 10 | 9 | +1 | 6 | | 0–9 | — | 7–0 | — |
| 3 | Papua New Guinea | 3 | 1 | 0 | 2 | 3 | 22 | −19 | 3 | | 0–14 | — | — | 3–1 |
| 4 | American Samoa | 3 | 0 | 0 | 3 | 1 | 12 | −11 | 0 | | — | 0–3 | — | — |

Source: OFC
(H) Hosts
13 April 2024
10:00

| Papua New Guinea | 0–14 | Solomon Islands |
|---|---|---|
| | Report | Kwaimasia 5', 31', 57'; Loben 13'; Kenimoi 15', 54', 90+5'; Wane 42'; Sihiu 48' (pen.), 55'; Sese 64', 90+2'; Feni 86', 90+9' |

Teufaiva Stadium, Nukuʻalofa
Attendance: 100
Referee: Chris Bennett (New Zealand)
13 April 2024
15:00

| American Samoa | 0–3 | Tonga |
|---|---|---|
| | Report | Falepapalangi 5'; Havea 60'; Faluku 69' |

Teufaiva Stadium, Nukuʻalofa
Attendance: 300
Referee: Deepak Raj (Fiji)

16 April 2024
10:00

| Papua New Guinea | 3–1 | American Samoa |
|---|---|---|
| Ure 6', 13', 43' | Report | Luvu 82' (pen.) |

Teufaiva Stadium, Nukuʻalofa
Attendance: 100
Referee: Jarethy George (Vanuatu)
16 April 2024
15:00

| Tonga | 0–9 | Solomon Islands |
|---|---|---|
| | Report | Sihiu 6', 26'; Kwaimasia 32', 59', 63', 74'; Sese 49'; Kenimoi 67'; Wane 69' |

Teufaiva Stadium, Nukuʻalofa
Attendance: 300
Referee: Peter Olomaga (Samoa)

19 April 2024
10:00

| Solomon Islands | 6–0 | American Samoa |
|---|---|---|
| Siuhiu 2'; Sese 15', 45'; Kwaimasia 56', 67'; Makana 79' | Report |

Teufaiva Stadium, Nukuʻalofa
Attendance: 100
Referee: Hiro Make (Tahiti)
19 April 2024
15:00

| Tonga | 7–0 | Papua New Guinea |
|---|---|---|
| Falepapalangi 34', 38', 75', 90'; 'Ainu'u 45+8'; Lonitensis 72', 90+7' | Report |

Teufaiva Stadium, Nukuʻalofa
Attendance: 300
Referee: Chris Bennett (New Zealand)
