= Faitalia Hamilton-Pama =

Samoan footballer

Personal information
- Full name: Faitalia Hamilton-Pama
- Date of birth: 17 May 1993 (age 33)
- Place of birth: Samoa
- Height: 1.90 m (6 ft 3 in)
- Position: Defender

Team information
- Current team: Central United

Youth career
- Auckland City

International career^{‡}
Years	Team	Apps	(Gls)
2015–	Samoa	5	(1)
- ‡ National team caps and goals as of 18 July 2019

Faitalia Hamilton-Pama (born 17 May 1993) is a Samoan professional footballer who plays as a defender. He currently plays for Central United. From 2015 to 2019 he was a member of the Samoa national football team.

== International career ==
In June 2019 he was named to the squad for the 2019 Pacific Games.

=== International goals ===
Scores and results list Samoa's goal tally first.

No	Date	Venue	Opponent	Score	Result	Competition
1.	31 August 2015	Loto-Tonga Soka Centre, Nuku'Alofa, Tonga	American Samoa	3–1	3–2	2018 FIFA World Cup qualification
2.	2 September 2015	Loto-Tonga Soka Centre, Nuku'Alofa, Tonga	Cook Islands	1–0	1–0	2018 FIFA World Cup qualification
