= Tama Fasavalu =

Samoan former international footballer

Personal information
- Date of birth: 07 03 1976
- Place of birth: Samoa
- Height: 6 ft 0 in (1.83 m)
- Position: Striker

Team information
- Current team: Central United
- Number: 19

Youth career
- 1989–1997: vikings fc
2004	Tuanaimoto Breeze		
- Central United

International career^{‡}
Years	Team	Apps	(Gls)
2002–	Samoa	3	(2)
- ‡ National team caps and goals as of 29 April 2010

Tama Fasavalu (born March 7, 1976) is a Samoan former international footballer who played in New Zealand for Central United as a defender. On May 3, 2012, Fasavalu was indefinitely suspended from the sport by the Auckland Football Federation after striking a referee and breaking his jaw during a match.

== Career ==
=== Club career ===
Fasavalu began his career in Samoa with Kiwi and Tuanaimoto Breeze, before moving to Central United in 2005. He subsequently moved to New Zealand second division Manukau City.

On 25 April 2012 while playing for Manukau City in a match against Tauranga City, Fasavalu was issued a second yellow card at the 79th minute, and subsequently struck referee Len Gattsche in the jaw, breaking it in three places and requiring surgery. Subsequently, Fasavalu was banned from the sport, fined, and criminally charged with wounding with intent to injure.

=== International career ===
Fasavalu has played at international level for Samoa.

== Career statistics ==
=== International goals ===
#	Date	Venue	Opponent	Score	Result	Competition
1.	10 May 2004	National Soccer Stadium, Apia, Samoa	American Samoa	4–0	Win	2006 FIFA World Cup Qual.
2.	10 May 2004	National Soccer Stadium, Apia, Samoa	American Samoa	4–0	Win	2006 FIFA World Cup Qual.
Correct as of 29 April 2010
