= Junior Michael =

Samoan footballer

Personal information
- Full name: Junior Palusam Michael
- Date of birth: 15 April 1971 (age 55)
- Place of birth: Samoa
- Position: Forward

Senior career*
Years	Team	Apps	(Gls)
1996–2001	Titavi FC		
2002	Kiwi FC		
2003	PanSa East FC		
2004–2006	AST Central United		
2007	Gruz Azull		

International career
1996–2007	Samoa	13	(5)
- * Club domestic league appearances and goals

Junior Michael is a former association footballer from Samoa, who played as a forward during his career. Michael played for 5 clubs as well as the Samoa national football team.

== Club career ==
=== Titavi FC ===
Michael began his career with the club from Samoa, spending five years at Titavi FC. During the player's time with the club, Titavi won the Samoa National League in 2000 and competed in the 2000-01 Oceania Club Championship. In the club championship, Titavi finished third in their group of 5 teams, narrowly missing out on the semi-finals of the competition.

=== Kiwi FC ===
Junior joined another Samoa-based club, Kiwi FC, in 2002. He only spent a year at the club before moving on again, to play for a foreign team for the first time in his career.

=== PanSa East FC ===
Michael signed for American Samoan side PanSa East FC in 2003. PanSa are historically American Samoa's most successful club, but they failed to win any silverware in the year Michael spent with them. At PanSa, Junior played alongside fellow Samoan Iosefa Maposua, a defender.

=== AST Central United ===
Samoan team AST Central United managed to lure Michael back to his country of birth in 2004. He spent two years at the club. During Michael's first season with Central United, they finished 5th in the Samoa National League. Junior scored twice in nine games in 2004, against Hosanna and Moa Moa. Both games finished 3–0 to Central United. Central United also reached the semi-finals of the Samoan National Cup in 2005, Michael's penultimate season with the club.

=== Gruz Azull ===
Gruz were Michael's final club before his retirement in 2007. He only spent a year at the club before hanging up his boots. However, he struck lucky in his decision to join the club, as Gruz Azull won the Samoa National League in 2007 for the only time in their history.

== International career ==
All of Michael's 13 appearances for Samoa came in qualification matches for a FIFA World Cup. He made his debut for the national team against Cook Islands in November 1996, in a 2–0 win for Samoa. The striker made his final appearance for the national team in the 2–1 win over Tonga in August 2007.

One of Michael's goals for his country came in the 8–0 win over American Samoa at Coffs Harbour, Australia in 2001. He also scored in a 4–1 loss to Papua New Guinea on 19 May 2004 in the 2004 Oceanian Nations Cup.
