= Vito Laloata =

Samoan footballer (born 1996)

Personal information
- Full name: Vito Laloata
- Date of birth: October 15, 1996 (age 30)
- Place of birth: Apia, Samoa
- Height: 1.88 m (6 ft 2 in)
- Position: Defender

Team information
- Current team: Lupe ole Soaga
- Number: 4

Senior career*
Years	Team	Apps	(Gls)
2012–2020	Lupe ole Soaga		
2020-	Hekari United		

International career^{‡}
2013	Samoa U17	3	(0)
2015–	Samoa	3	(2)
- * Club domestic league appearances and goals ‡ National team caps and goals as of 12 July 2019

Vito Laloata (born 15 October 1996) is a Samoan footballer who plays as a defender for Lupe ole Soaga in the Samoa National League and the Samoa national football team.

Laloata is from Magiagi Tai in Apia. He has played for Lupe ole Soaga since the age of ten.

Laloata played for Lupe ole Soaga in the Samoa National League and OFC Champions League. In 2020 he was recruited by Papua New Guinea club Hekari United for the 2020 OFC Champions League. He was released by Hekari in May 2020 due to uncertainty caused by the COVID-19 pandemic.

In June 2019 he was named to the Samoa national football team for the 2019 Pacific Games.

== Career statistics ==
=== International ===
Appearances and goals by national team and year
National team	Year	Apps	Goals
Samoa	2015	1	0
Samoa	2019	3	3
Total		4	3

Scores and results list Samoa's goal tally first, score column indicates score after each Laloata goal.

List of international goals scored by Vito Laloata
No.	Date	Venue	Opponent	Score	Result	Competition	Ref.
1	10 July 2019	National Soccer Stadium, Apia, Samoa	New Zealand (U-23)	–	1–5	2019 Pacific Games	
2	12 July 2019	National Soccer Stadium, Apia, Samoa	Tonga	1–0	2–0	2019 Pacific Games	
3	12 July 2019	National Soccer Stadium, Apia, Samoa	Tonga	2–0	2–0	2019 Pacific Games	
