= Loto-Tonga Soka Centre =

Sports venue in Tonga

- TFA Stadium
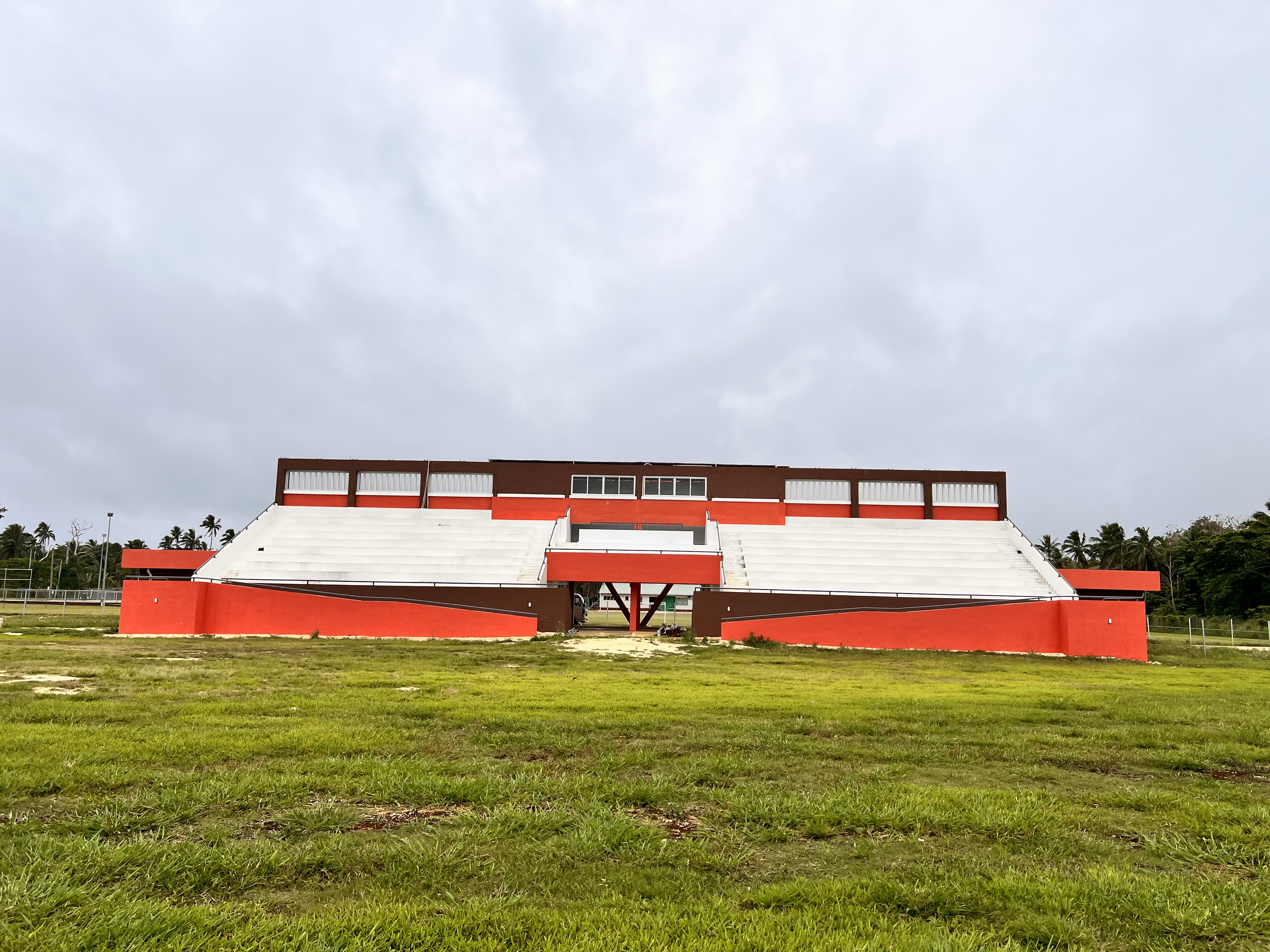
- The stadium in November 2025
- Interactive map of Loto-Tonga Soka Centre
- Location: Nukuʻalofa, Tonga
- Coordinates: 21.190°S 175.223°W
- Owner: Tonga Football Association
- Capacity: 500
- Surface: Grass

Construction
- Opened: 2001
- Renovated: August 2022–August 2024
- Cost: USD 4 million (Reconstruction only)
- Main contractor: Dexing Construction Ltd.

Tenant
- Tonga national football team

The Loto-Tonga Soka Centre is a 500-seat association football stadium in Nukuʻalofa, Tonga that serves as the home of the Tonga national football team. The stadium is the second-largest outdoor venue in the country, behind only the Teufaiva Sport Stadium. The main office of the Tonga Football Association is also located at the venue.

== History ==
The Loto-Tonga Soka Centre was funded by FIFA through the world football body's Goal Programme and opened in 2001. It hosted matches of the first round of the OFC 2018 FIFA World Cup qualifiers. It had an originally capacity of 1,500 and was home to the Tonga national football team and Veitongo FC. The original facility was demolished and the land was redeveloped for the construction of the new Loto-Tonga Soka Centre.

Plans for a new 700-seat association football stadium to be built on the site of the former Loto-Tonga Soka Centre were revealed in 2019. The deadline for construction bids for the new facility closed in September of that year. Construction had not begun by February 2021, but construction bids were called for again after the Tonga Football Association received funding for the project from FIFA. The stadium would be built to be resistant to natural disasters such as cyclones which occur annually in the nation, in line with FIFA's policies.

The groundbreaking ceremony on the site was held on 17 August 2022. By November, construction of the stadium had begun with local company Dexing Construction Ltd as the contractor. The target opening for the facility was moved to June 2023 because of challenges presented by the COVID-19 pandemic and the 2022 Hunga Tonga–Hunga Haʻapai eruption and tsunami. Final plans included an altered seating capacity of 500 at a cost of USD 4 million. In July 2023, FIFA president Gianni Infantino visited Tonga on his tour of Oceania. As part of the visit, he evaluated progress on the stadium which was then expected to open in 2024. He also announced other infrastructure projects in the kingdom, including the establishment of technical centres on the islands of Ha’apai and ʻEua.

In February 2024, it was announced that the stadium was expected to be completed by the end of August the same year. The new stadium was selected as the venue for 2024 OFC U-16 Men's Championship qualification in April 2024.

== Gallery ==
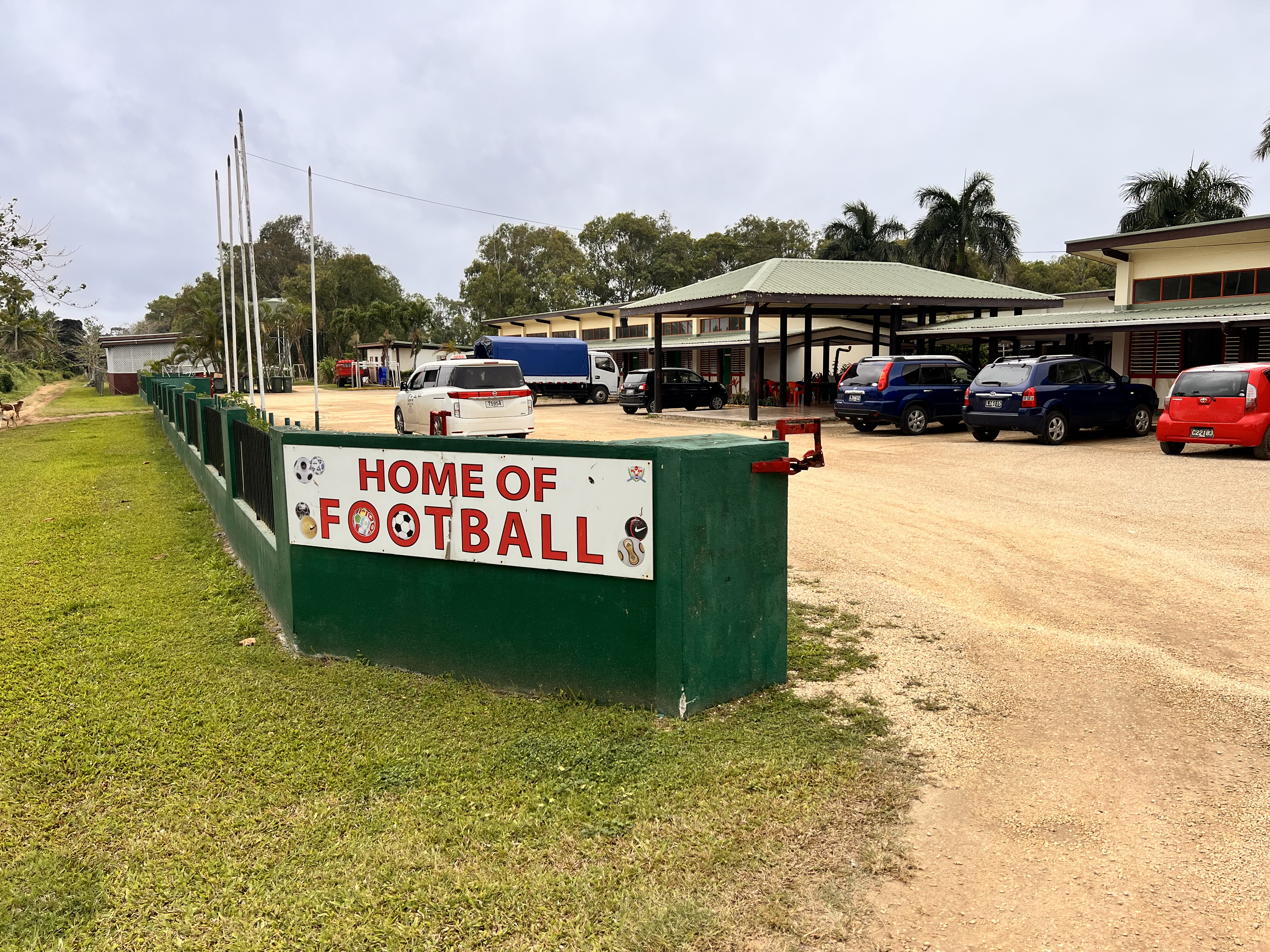
Entrance

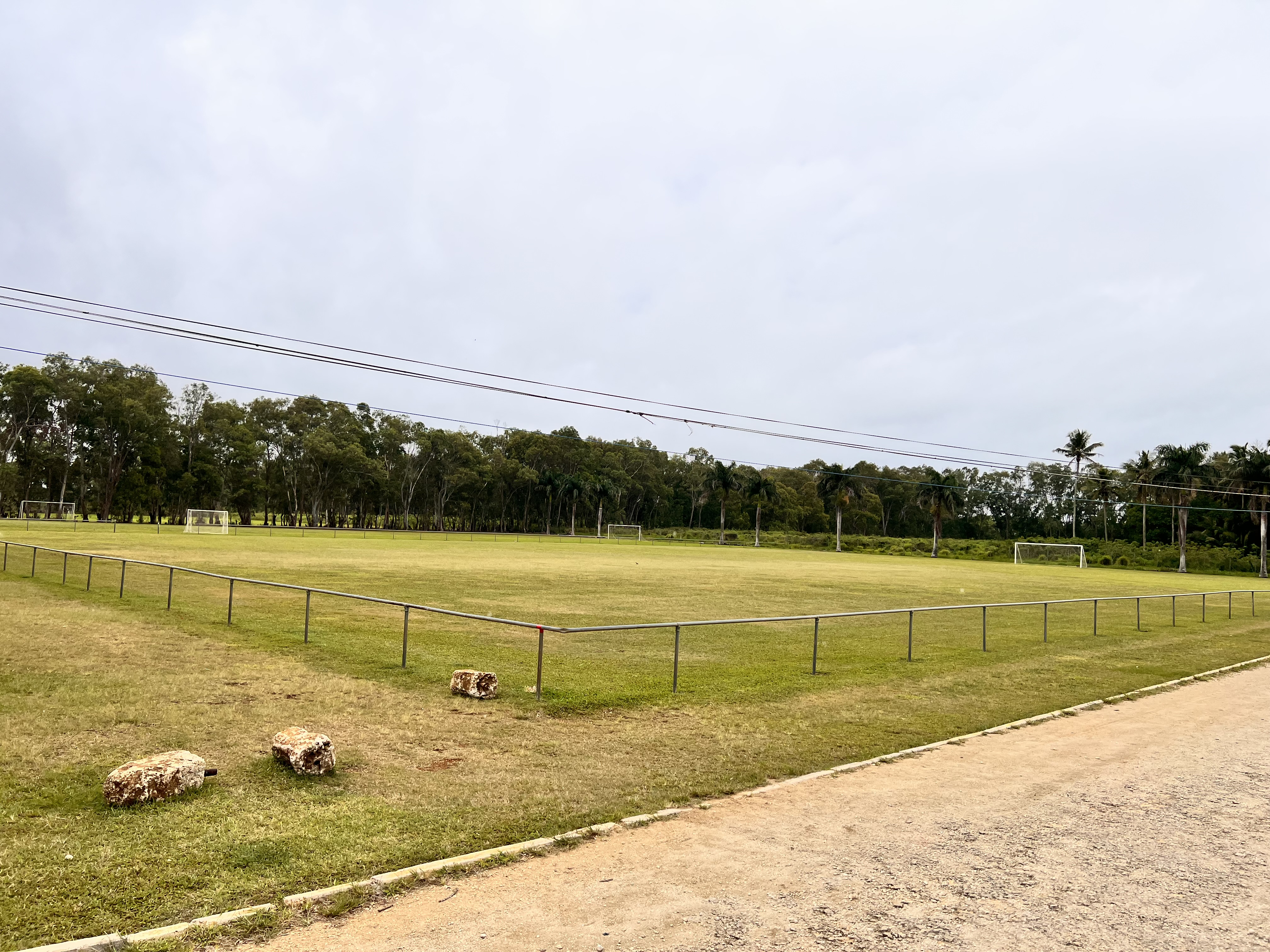
Practice fields at the centre

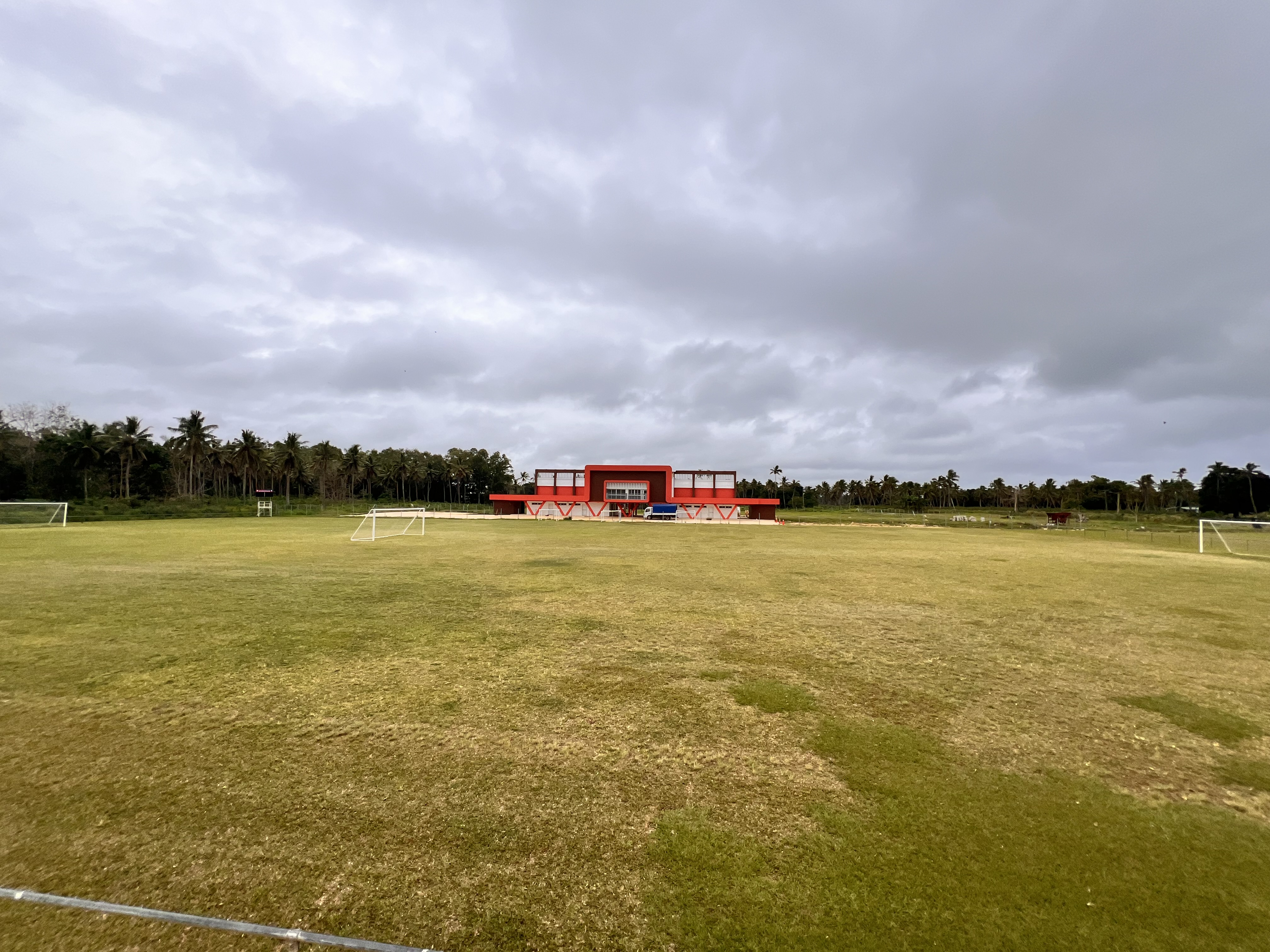
Practice field and stadium facade

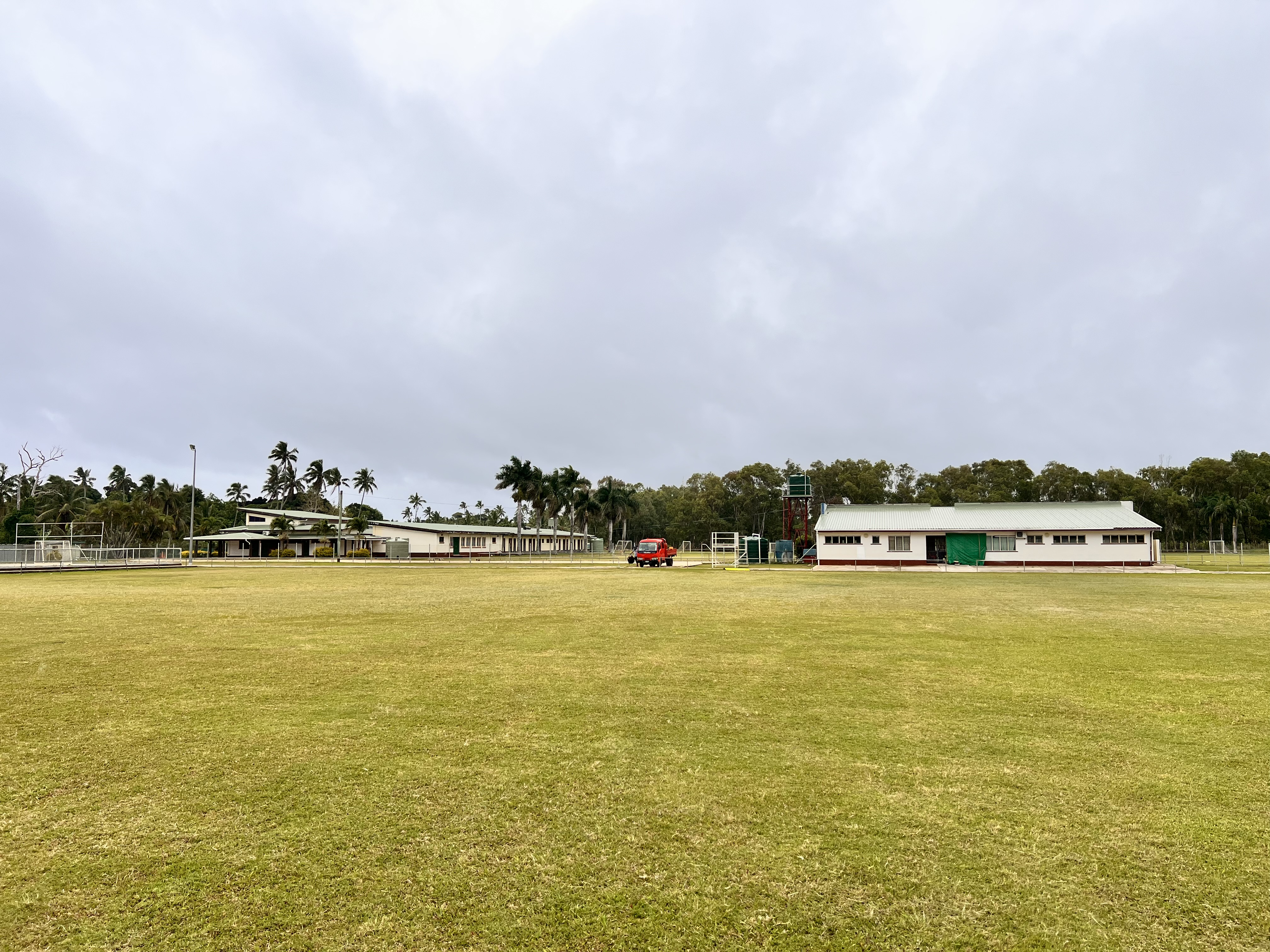
Other facilities

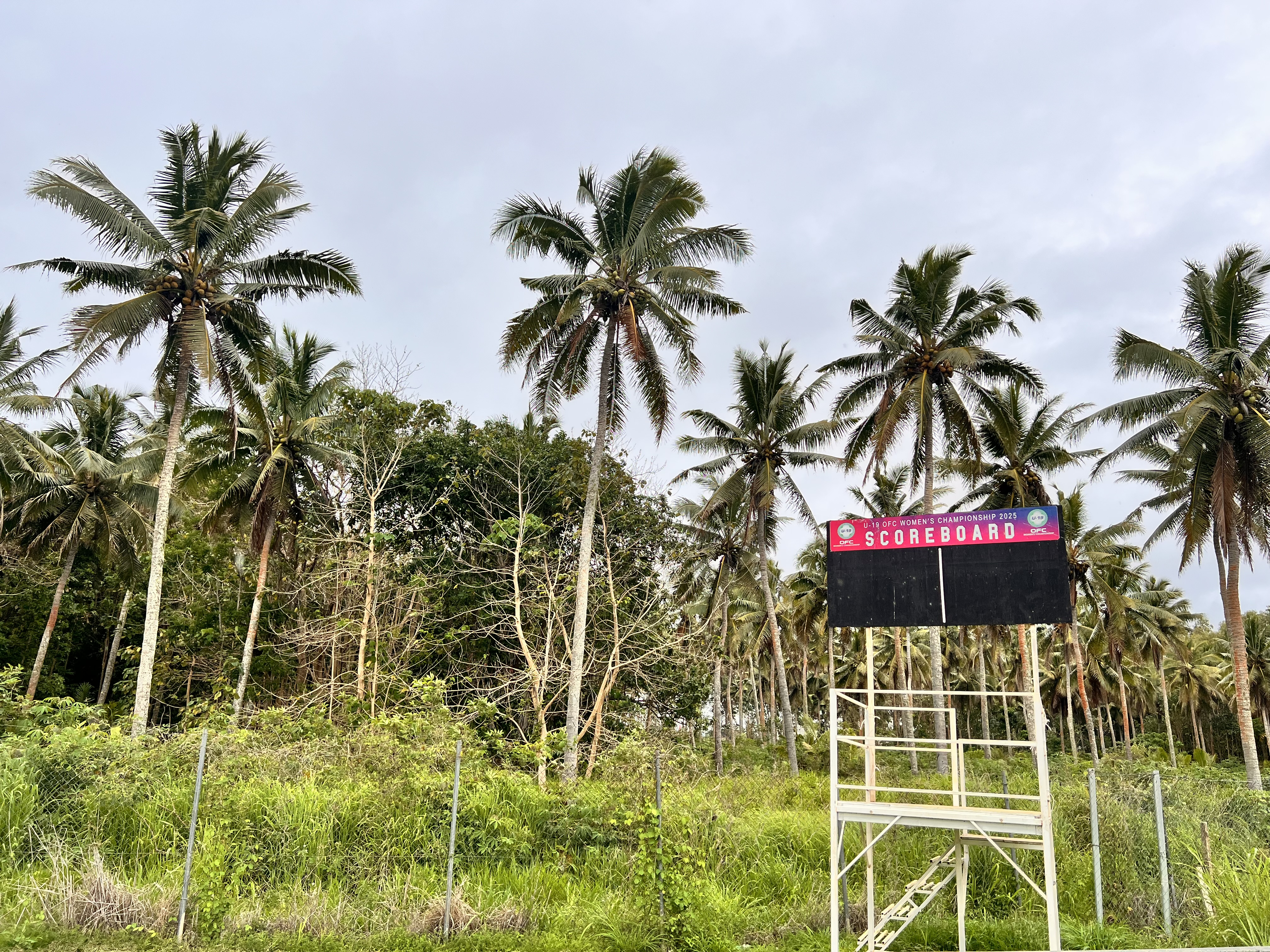
Main scoreboard
