= Samoa national football team =

Men's association football team

Samoa
- Association: Football Federation Samoa (FFS)
- Confederation: OFC (Oceania)
- Head coach: Jess Ibrom
- Captain: Andrew Setefano
- Most caps: Andrew Setefano (28)
- Top scorer: Desmond Fa'aiuaso (9)
- Home stadium: National Soccer Stadium
- FIFA code: SAM
First colours	Second colours

FIFA ranking
- Current: 189 ▼1 (7 October 2026)
- Highest: 146 (December 2007)
- Lowest: 204 (November 2011)

First international
- Solomon Islands 12–0 Western Samoa (Suva, Fiji; 31 August 1979)

Biggest win
- Samoa 10–0 American Samoa (Honiara, Solomon Islands; 20 November 2023)

Biggest defeat
- Tahiti 13–0 Western Samoa (Honiara, Solomon Islands; 13 July 1981)

OFC Nations Cup
- Appearances: 3 (first in 2012)
- Best result: Group stage (2012, 2016, 2024)

Pacific Games
- Appearances: 5 (first in 1979)
- Best result: Quarter-finals (1983)

The Samoa national football team (Samoan: ʻau soka o Sāmoa) represents Samoa in men's international football and is controlled by the Football Federation Samoa, the governing body for football in Samoa. Samoa's home ground is Toleafoa J. S. Blatter Soccer Stadium in Apia. The team was known as Western Samoa (Samoan: Sāmoa i Sisifo) until 1997.

== History ==
=== Beginnings (1979–1993) ===
Although they had not taken part in the first five editions of the South Pacific Games, their geographical proximity to Fiji, host of 1979 South Pacific Games, allowed them to participate for the first time. They lost both group stage matches to Wallis and Futuna 3–1 and Solomon Islands 12–0. Four years later, as hosts of the 1983 edition, they beat American Samoa 3–1, drew 3–3 with Tonga and fell again to Wallis and Futuna, but the results allowed them to advance to the next round. In the quarterfinals, Tahiti eliminated them by beating them 2–0.

Samoa entered qualification for the 1988 Summer Olympics however they were defeated by New Zealand over two legs, losing 7–0 at home before being defeated 12–0 in Auckland. In the playoffs for the next round, Samoa lost to Chinese Taipei 5–0 and were eliminated.

=== Regional Frustrations (1994–2010) ===
In 1994 they hosted the first edition of the Polynesia Cup, where they beat American Samoa, tied with Tonga and lost to Tahiti to finish in third position. In 1998 they were third again, coming within a point of the Cook Islands in second. Samoa returned to finish third again in the 2000 edition by beating Tonga and American Samoa, but losing to the Cook Islands and Tahiti.

After four tournaments absent, they returned in the 2007 South Pacific Games as hosts. They managed six points by beating Tonga and American Samoa again, but were eliminated after losing to the Solomon Islands and Vanuatu.

=== OFC Nations Cup (2011–present) ===
In 2011, they hosted the OFC Nations Cup qualifying tournament. There, they beat the Cook Islands 3–2, drew 1–1 with Tonga and defeated American Samoa 1–0 to qualify for the first time in their history. At the championship proper, they were beaten 10–1 by Tahiti, 5–0 by Vanuatu and 9–0 by New Caledonia.

In the 2016 qualifiers, they beat American Samoa 3–2 and lost 1–0 to the Cook Islands. In their final game, the Samoan team defeated Tonga 3-0 and qualified on goal difference, because of American Samoa's 2–0 win over the Cookian team. At the tournament, which took place in Papua New Guinea, the Samoan team lost 4–0 to Tahiti, 7–0 to New Caledonia and 8–0 to the local team. Therefore, they finished in last place in their group without a single point.

During 2024 qualifying, Samoa qualified for the final tournament after a 4-1 win over Tonga, and a 1-0 win against Cook Islands. Samoa were then eliminated from the 2024 OFC Men's Nations Cup after a 2-0 defeat to Tahiti, a 9-1 defeat against co-hosts Fiji, and a 2-1 defeat against Papua New Guinea; this ensured their elimination as Samoa placed fourth in Group B after conceding thirteen goals without a single point.

== Kit sponsorship ==
Kit supplier	Period
(Germany) Puma	1998
(Italy) Lotto	2000
(United Kingdom) Admiral	2001
(Germany) Uhlsport	2002
(Italy) Lotto	2004
(Germany) Uhlsport	2005
(Italy) Lotto	2006–2014
(United States) Nike	2015–2016
(Germany) Adidas	2016–2018
FC	2018
(Italy) Lotto	2019–

== Results and fixtures ==
The following is a list of match results in the last 12 months, as well as any future matches that have been scheduled.

== Coaching staff ==
Position	Name
Head coach	(New Zealand) Jess Ibrom
Assistant coach	(New Zealand) Alastair McLae
Goalkeeping coach	(Samoa) Joseph Kapisi
Team manager	(Samoa) Saolotoga Pula
Technical adviser	(New Zealand) Jess Ibrom
Gear manager	(Samoa) Bevan Kapisi
International Scout	(New Zealand) Alastair McLae
International Scout	(England) Russ Gurr

=== Coaching history ===
- (Samoa) Terry Epa (1996–2001)
- (Argentina) Vic Fernandez (2001–2002)
- (Samoa) Malo Vaga (2002)
- (England) David Brand (2002/2005)
- (Germany) Rudi Gutendorf (2003)
- (Samoa) Falevi Umutaua (2007)
- (American Samoa) Tunoa Lui (2011)
- (Samoa) Malo Vaga (2012–2014)
- (Samoa) Phineas Young (2014–2016)
- (New Zealand) Scott Easthope (2016–2018)
- (Samoa) Paul Ualesi (2019)
- (New Zealand) Matt Calcott (2021–2022)
- (Northern Ireland) Ryan Stewart (2023–2024)
- (New Zealand) Jess Ibrom (2024–present)

== Players ==
The following players were called up for the 2024 OFC Men's Nations Cup.

Caps and goals correct as of 22 June 2024, after the game against Papua New Guinea.

No.	Pos.	Player	Date of birth (age)	Caps	Goals	Club
	GK	Joel Bartley	13 April 2005 (age 21)	7	0	(Football Australia) Sydney United
	GK	Paul Taupau	1 January 2006 (age 20)	1	0	(New Zealand Football) Franklin United
	GK	Kirk Auvele	10 June 2006 (age 20)	0	0	(Football Federation Samoa) Vaivase-Tai
	DF	Andrew Setefano	10 August 1987 (age 39)	23	0	(Football Federation Samoa) Lupe o le Soaga
	DF	Faitalia Hamilton-Pama	17 May 1993 (age 33)	9	1	(New Zealand Football) Western Springs
	DF	Luke Salisbury	15 September 2004 (age 22)	8	1	(New Zealand Football) Roslyn-Wakari
	DF	Luke Tolo-Kent	29 April 2003 (age 23)	8	0	(New Zealand Football) Miramar Rangers
	DF	Taine Wilson	8 November 2004 (age 22)	7	0	(New Zealand Football) Nelson Suburbs
	DF	Harry Chote	4 November 1999 (age 27)	3	0	(New Zealand Football) Miramar Rangers
	DF	Niko Steinmetz	20 April 2000 (age 26)	3	0	(New Zealand Football) Western Springs
	MF	Dauntae Mariner	25 January 2000 (age 26)	8	0	(New Zealand Football) South Island United
	MF	Kaleb De Groot-Green	11 May 2002 (age 24)	6	0	(New Zealand Football) Christchurch United
	MF	Jarvis Filimalae	20 April 2003 (age 23)	5	0	(Football Federation Samoa) Lupe o le Soaga
	MF	Alex Malauulu	12 March 2006 (age 20)	2	0	(Argentine Football Association) San Jorge
	MF	Caleb Hilbron	1 January 2002 (age 24)	1	0	(New Zealand Football) Island Bay United
	MF	Jesse Vine	23 January 2003 (age 23)	1	0	(Football Australia) Kemps Creek United
	FW	Pharrell Trainor	20 June 2006 (age 20)	6	2	(German Football Association) TSV Schott Mainz
	FW	Dilo Tumua	15 March 2000 (age 26)	5	3	(Football Federation Samoa) Vaivase-Tai
	FW	Michael Tumua Leo	15 January 2003 (age 23)	5	5	(Football Federation Samoa) Lupe o le Soaga
	FW	Kyah Cahill	13 March 2003 (age 23)	2	0	unattached
	FW	Juan Gobbi	17 November 2005 (age 20)	2	0	unattached
	FW	Darcy Knight	18 February 2000 (age 26)	2	0	(New Zealand Football) Onehunga Mangere United
	FW	Greg Siamoa	21 August 2003 (age 23)	1	0	(Football Federation of Cambodia) Life FC

=== Recent call-ups ===
Pos.	Player	Date of birth (age)	Caps	Goals	Club	Latest call-up

== Player records ==
As of 18 November 2024
Players in bold are still active with Samoa.

=== Most appearances ===
Rank	Name	Caps	Goals	Career
1	**Andrew Setefano**	28	0	2011–present
2	Desmond Fa'aiuaso	20	9	2001–2016
3	Filipo Bureta	14	0	2001–2016
3	Lionel Taylor	14	1	2004–2016
5	Junior Michael	13	5	1996–2007
5	**Luke Tolo Kent**	13	0	2023–present
5	**Dauntae Mariner**	13	0	2023–present
5	**Luke Salisbury**	13	2	2023–present
9	Silao Malo	12	2	2011–2016
9	Jarrell Sale	12	0	2007–2015
9	Mike Saofaiga	12	0	2011–2019

=== Top goalscorers ===
Rank	Name	Goals	Caps	Ratio	Career
1	Desmond Fa'aiuaso	9	20	0.45	2001–2016
2	**Michael Tumua Leo**	5	6	0.83	2023–present
2	Junior Michael	5	13	0.38	1996–2007
4	**Dilo Tumua**	4	7	0.57	2023–present
5	Tama Fasavalu	3	4	0.75	2002–2004
5	Vito Laloata	3	4	0.75	2015–2019
5	**Nathan Viliamu**	3	7	0.43	2024–present
5	Pualele Lemana	3	11	0.27	2001–2004

== Competitive record ==
=== FIFA World Cup ===
FIFA World Cup record									FIFA World Cup qualification record					
Year	Result	Position	Pld	W	D	L	GF	GA	Pld	W	D	L	GF	GA
1930 to 1986	Not a FIFA member								Not a FIFA member					
as Western Samoa									as Western Samoa					
(Italy) 1990	Did not enter								Did not enter					
(United States) 1994	Withdrew								Withdrew					
as Samoa									as Samoa					
(France) 1998	Did not qualify								2	1	0	1	2	2
(South Korea) (Japan) 2002	Did not qualify								4	1	0	3	9	18
(Germany) 2006	Did not qualify								4	1	0	3	5	11
(South Africa) 2010	Did not qualify								4	2	0	2	9	8
(Brazil) 2014	Did not qualify								6	2	1	3	6	27
(Russia) 2018	Did not qualify								6	2	0	4	6	22
(Qatar) 2022	Withdrew								Withdrew					
(Canada) (Mexico) (United States) 2026	Did not qualify								5	2	0	3	5	16
(Morocco) (Portugal) (Spain) 2030	To be determined								To be determined					
(Saudi Arabia) 2034	To be determined								To be determined					
Total	–	0/9	–	–	–	–	–	–	31	11	1	19	42	104

=== OFC Nations Cup ===
Oceania Cup / OFC Nations Cup record										Qualification record					
Year	Round	Position	Pld	W	D	L	GF	GA	Squad	Pld	W	D	L	GF	GA
as Western Samoa
(New Zealand) 1973	Did not enter									Did not enter					
(New Caledonia) 1980	Did not enter									Did not enter					
(Pacific Community) 1996	Did not qualify									3	1	1	1	5	10
as Samoa
(Australia) 1998	Did not qualify									4	2	0	2	8	7
(French Polynesia) 2000	Did not qualify									4	2	0	2	13	6
(New Zealand) 2002	Did not qualify									4	2	0	2	8	9
(Australia) 2004	Did not qualify									4	1	0	3	5	11
(Pacific Community) 2008	Did not qualify									4	2	0	2	9	8
(Solomon Islands) 2012	Group stage	8th	3	0	0	3	1	24	Squad	3	2	1	0	5	3
(Papua New Guinea) 2016	Group stage	8th	3	0	0	3	0	19	Squad	3	2	0	1	6	3
(Fiji) (Vanuatu) 2024	Group stage	7th	3	0	0	3	2	13	Squad	2	2	0	0	5	1
Total	Group stage	3/11	9	0	0	9	3	56	—	31	16	2	13	64	58

=== Pacific Games ===
Pacific Games record
Year	Round	Position	Pld	W	D	L	GF	GA
(Fiji) 1963	Did not enter							
(New Caledonia) 1966	Did not enter							
(Papua New Guinea) 1969	Did not enter							
(French Polynesia) 1971	Did not enter							
(Guam) 1975	Did not enter							
(Fiji) 1979	Group stage	10th	3	0	0	3	3	19
(Samoa) 1983	Quarter-finals	6th	4	1	1	2	7	8
(New Caledonia) 1987	Did not enter							
(Papua New Guinea) 1991	Did not enter							
(French Polynesia) 1995	Did not enter							
(Fiji) 2003	Did not enter							
(Samoa) 2007	Group stage	5th	4	2	0	2	9	8
(New Caledonia) 2011	Did not enter							
(Papua New Guinea) 2015	N/A – tournament was U23							
(Samoa) 2019	Group stage	8th	4	1	0	3	3	22
(Solomon Islands) 2023	Group stage	7th	4	2	0	2	14	3
Total	Quarter-finals	5/16	19	6	1	12	36	60

== Head-to-head record ==
As of 15 November 2024

Team	Pld	W	D	L	GF	GA	GD	WPCT
American Samoa	12	12	0	0	56	5	+51	100.00
Australia	1	0	0	1	0	11	−11	0.00
Chinese Taipei	1	0	0	1	0	5	−5	0.00
Cook Islands	7	3	1	3	9	9	0	42.86
Fiji	6	0	0	6	3	31	−28	0.00
Guam	1	0	0	1	2	4	−2	0.00
New Caledonia	4	0	0	4	0	29	−29	0.00
New Zealand	2	0	0	2	0	19	−19	0.00
Papua New Guinea	6	0	0	6	5	28	−23	0.00
Solomon Islands	4	0	0	4	0	21	−21	0.00
Tahiti	10	0	0	10	4	50	−46	0.00
Tonga	13	8	3	2	27	11	+16	61.54
Tuvalu	1	0	0	1	0	3	−3	0.00
Vanuatu	6	0	0	6	2	40	−38	0.00
Wallis and Futuna	2	0	0	2	2	5	−3	0.00
Total	76	23	4	49	110	271	−161	30.26

Source: 1979–97 results and 1998–present results

Includes results as Western Samoa.

== Honours ==
=== Subcontinental ===
- Polynesia Cup
  - (bronze) Third place (3): 1994, 1998, 2000
