= 2019 New Caledonia Super Ligue =

New Caledonia Super Ligue
- Season: 2019
- Champions: Hienghène Sport
- Relegated: Trio Kedeigne; Wacaelé
- OFC Champions League: Hienghène Sport; Magenta

The 2019 New Caledonia Super Ligue is the 46th season of the New Caledonia Super Ligue, the top-flight football league in New Caledonia. The season started on 30 March 2019. A.S. Magenta were the defending champions. Hienghène Sport were crowned champions.

== Teams ==
A total of ten teams compete in the league, reduced from the previous season of twelve teams. Thio Sport, Racing de Poindimié, and AGJP were relegated from last season, and were replaced by promoted team Wacaelé.

- Hienghène Sport
- Horizon Patho
- Lössi
- Magenta
- Mont-Dore
- Ne Drehu
- Tiga Sport
- Trio Kedeigne
- Wacaelé
- Wetr

== League table ==
Note: 4 points for a win, 2 points for a draw, 1 point for a defeat.

Pos	Team	Pld	W	D	L	GF	GA	GD	Pts	Qualification or relegation
1	Hienghène Sport (C, Q)	18	15	2	1	60	15	+45	65	Qualification to 2021 OFC Champions League group stage
2	Magenta (Q)	18	14	3	1	56	19	+37	63	Qualification to 2021 OFC Champions League group stage
3	Mont-Dore	18	7	3	8	34	30	+4	42	
4	Tiga Sport	18	7	3	8	29	29	0	42	
5	Ne Drehu	18	6	6	6	25	31	−6	42	
6	Lössi	18	6	6	6	31	44	−13	42	
7	Wetr	18	6	2	10	33	35	−2	38	
8	Horizon Patho	18	5	4	9	27	36	−9	37	
9	Trio Kedeigne (R)	18	4	2	12	27	53	−26	32	Qualification to Relegation playoff
10	Wacaelé (R)	18	4	1	13	28	58	−30	31	Relegation to New Caledonia Ligue 2

Source: Fedcalfoot
(C) Champions; (Q) Qualified for the phase indicated; (R) Relegated

== Relegation playoff ==
The four participating teams were:

- Trio Kedeigne (Super Ligue 9th place)
- Baco (winners of Promotion d'Honneur Nord)
- Kunié (winners of Promotion d'Honneur Sud)
- Qanono (winners of Championnat des Iles)

The two winners of the relegation playoff matches earned places in the 2020 New Caledonia Super Ligue.

14 December 2019

Baco	4–1	Qanono

Stade Boéwa, Boulari, Mont-Dore
14 December 2019

Trio Kedeigne	1–3	Kunié

Stade Boéwa, Boulari, Mont-Dore

Baco and Kunié were promoted; Trio Kedeigne were relegated.
