= 2002 OFC Nations Cup squads =

The 2002 OFC Nations Cup was an international football tournament that was held in Auckland, New Zealand from 5 to 14 July 2002. The 8 national teams involved in the tournament were required to register a squad of players; only players in these squads were eligible to take part in the tournament. An initial six-team qualifying phase took place in Samoa from 9 to 18 March 2002 allowing the top two, New Caledonia and Papua New Guinea, to move on and join Australia, Fiji, New Zealand, Solomon Islands, Tahiti and Vanuatu at the main tournament.

Players marked (c) were named as captain for their national squad. Players' club teams and players' age are as of 5 July 2002 – the tournament's opening day.

== Group A ==
=== Australia ===
Coach: Frank Farina

No.	Pos.	Player	Date of birth (age)	Caps	Club
1	GK	Jason Petkovic	7 December 1972 (aged 29)		(Australia) Perth Glory
2	DF	Fausto De Amicis	26 June 1968 (aged 34)		(Australia) South Melbourne
3	DF	Jade North	7 January 1982 (aged 20)		(Australia) Sydney Olympic
4	DF	Mehmet Duraković	13 October 1965 (aged 36)		(Australia) South Melbourne
5	DF	Steve Horvat	14 March 1971 (aged 31)		(Australia) Melbourne Knights
6	DF	Patrick Kisnorbo	24 March 1981 (aged 21)		(Australia) South Melbourne
7	MF	Robbie Middleby	9 August 1975 (aged 26)		(Australia) Newcastle Jets
8	FW	Joel Porter	25 December 1978 (aged 23)		(Australia) Melbourne Knights
9	FW	Damian Mori (c)	30 September 1970 (aged 31)		(Australia) Perth Glory
10	FW	Bobby Despotovski	14 July 1971 (aged 30)		(Australia) Perth Glory
11	MF	Scott Chipperfield	30 December 1975 (aged 26)		(Switzerland) Basel
12	MF	Tom Pondeljak	8 January 1976 (aged 26)		(Australia) Sydney Olympic
13	DF	Milan Blagojevic	24 December 1969 (aged 32)		(Australia) Newcastle Jets
14	DF	Angelo Costanzo	9 May 1976 (aged 26)		(Australia) Marconi Stallions
15	FW	Ante Milicic	4 April 1974 (aged 28)		(Australia) Sydney United
16	FW	Paul Trimboli	25 February 1969 (aged 33)		(Australia) South Melbourne
17	DF	Ante Juric	11 November 1973 (aged 28)		(Australia) Sydney Olympic
18	GK	Dean Anastasiadis	6 June 1970 (aged 32)		(Australia) Wollongong Wolves

=== Fiji ===
Coach: Billy Singh

No.	Pos.	Player	Date of birth (age)	Caps	Club
1	GK	Laisena Tuba	13 August 1978 (aged 23)		(Fiji) Nadroga
2	DF	Viliame Toma	22 January 1979 (aged 23)		(Fiji) Nadi
3	DF	Ovini Duguca	27 July 1978 (aged 23)		(Fiji) Nadroga
4	MF	Seveci Rokotakala	29 May 1978 (aged 24)		(Fiji) Lautoka
5	DF	Valerio Nasema	19 July 1972 (aged 29)		(Fiji) Ba
7	DF	Manoa Masi	18 August 1974 (aged 27)		(Fiji) Nadroga
8	MF	Emosi Baleinuku	2 April 1975 (aged 27)		(Fiji) Nadi
9	FW	Josaia Bukaudi	27 May 1981 (aged 21)		(Fiji) Ba
10	MF	Keni Doidoi	26 November 1976 (aged 25)		(Fiji) Ba
11	DF	Lorima Dau	29 July 1983 (aged 18)		(Fiji) Rewa
12	FW	Esala Masi (c)	9 March 1974 (aged 28)		(Australia) Newcastle Jets
13	MF	Meli Delai	Unknown		(Fiji) Ba
14	DF	Jope Namawa	4 May 1974 (aged 28)		(Fiji) Ba
15	MF	Stewart Bola	17 October 1975 (aged 26)		(Fiji) Rewa
16	MF	Apenisa Qereqeretabua	Unknown		(Fiji) Nadroga
17	DF	Malakai Kainihewe	28 July 1977 (aged 24)		(Fiji) Tavua
18	FW	Veresa Toma	26 August 1981 (aged 20)		(Singapore) Gombak United
19	MF	Sailesh Samy	21 March 1977 (aged 25)		(Fiji) Lautoka
20	GK	Luke Tavuyara	9 October 1975 (aged 26)		(Fiji) Nadroga

=== New Caledonia ===
Coach: (France) Serge Martinengo de Novack

No.	Pos.	Player	Date of birth (age)	Caps	Club
1	GK	Michel Hne	15 May 1979 (aged 23)		(New Caledonia) Gaïtcha FCN
2	DF	Theodore Pian	5 November 1982 (aged 19)		(New Caledonia) USC Nouméa
3	DF	Alain Kecine	9 February 1979 (aged 23)		(New Caledonia) AS Magenta
4	DF	Franck Oiremoin	4 March 1975 (aged 27)		(New Caledonia) AS Mont-Dore
5	DF	Jean-Marc Case (c)	2 June 1977 (aged 25)		(New Caledonia) AS Mont-Dore
6	MF	Gil Elmour	11 June 1977 (aged 25)		(New Caledonia) AS Magenta
7	MF	Yves Faye	22 March 1976 (aged 26)		(New Caledonia) AS Mont-Dore
8	DF	Steeven Longue	29 July 1978 (aged 23)		(New Caledonia) AS Mont-Dore
9	FW	Iamel Kabeu	7 September 1982 (aged 19)		(New Caledonia) JS Baco
10	FW	Marius Mapou	22 June 1980 (aged 22)		(New Caledonia) AS Mont-Dore
11	MF	Stone Longue	11 December 1979 (aged 22)		(New Caledonia) AS Mont-Dore
12	FW	Pierre Tidjine	5 April 1984 (aged 18)		(New Caledonia) AS Poum
13	MF	Robert Kaumé	4 July 1973 (aged 29)		(New Caledonia) AS Magenta
14	DF	André Sinédo	26 February 1978 (aged 24)		(New Caledonia) AS Magenta
15	DF	Ricardo Nepamoindou			(New Caledonia) AS Mont-Dore
16	MF	Jacques Dahote	8 December 1974 (aged 27)		(New Caledonia) AS Poum
17	DF	Maurice Cawa	23 January 1974 (aged 28)		(New Caledonia) JS Baco
18	FW	David Hay	7 June 1983 (aged 19)		(New Caledonia) AS Mont-Dore
20	GK	Justin Dawano	8 September 1980 (aged 21)		(New Caledonia) AS Mont-Dore

=== Vanuatu ===
Coach: (Uruguay) Juan Carlos Buzzetti

No.	Pos.	Player	Date of birth (age)	Caps	Club
1	GK	David Chilia	10 June 1978 (aged 24)		(Vanuatu) Tupuji Imere
2	DF	Ken Masauvakalo	20 November 1984 (aged 17)		(Vanuatu) Amicale
3	DF	Manley Tabe	1 June 1981 (aged 21)		(Vanuatu) Shepherds United
4	MF	Simon Lauru	30 January 1972 (aged 30)		(Vanuatu) Shepherds United
5	DF	Lexa Bibi	16 April 1978 (aged 24)		(Vanuatu) Tupuji Imere
6	DF	Willie Marango	29 December 1983 (aged 18)		(Vanuatu) Tupuji Imere
7	DF	Fedy Vava	25 November 1982 (aged 19)		(Vanuatu) Tafea
8	FW	Ali Silas	23 June 1982 (aged 20)		(Vanuatu) Tafea
9	MF	Seimata Chilia	2 August 1978 (aged 23)		(Australia) Fawkner Blues
10	FW	Etienne Mermer	26 January 1977 (aged 25)		(Vanuatu) Nipikinamu
11	MF	Gérard Maki Haitong	6 July 1978 (aged 23)		(Vanuatu) Amicale
12	DF	Graham Demas	25 October 1980 (aged 21)		(Vanuatu) Tafea
13	FW	Sandy Alick	2 June 1963 (aged 39)		(Vanuatu) Atsal
14	FW	Richard Iwai	15 March 1979 (aged 23)		(Vanuatu) Tafea
15	MF	Pita David Maki	12 October 1982 (aged 19)		(Vanuatu) Yatel
16	DF	Daniel Alick	30 July 1982 (aged 19)		(Vanuatu) Shepherds United
17	MF	Alphonse Qorig	7 July 1981 (aged 20)		(Vanuatu) Shepherds United
18	MF	Jean Robert Yelou	25 September 1983 (aged 18)		(Vanuatu) Tafea
19	MF	Tom Tomake	23 September 1982 (aged 19)		(Vanuatu) Amicale
20	GK	John Garae	5 April 1983 (aged 19)		(Vanuatu) Tafea

== Group B ==
=== New Zealand ===
Coach: (England) Mick Waitt

No.	Pos.	Player	Date of birth (age)	Caps	Club
1	GK	Jason Batty	7 December 1972 (aged 29)		(New Zealand) Glenfield Rovers
2	DF	Duncan Oughton	14 June 1977 (aged 25)		(United States) Columbus Crew
3	DF	Lee Jones	21 February 1975 (aged 27)		(Finland) FC Jokerit
4	DF	Chris Zoricich	3 May 1969 (aged 33)		(Australia) Newcastle Jets
5	DF	Jonathan Perry	22 November 1976 (aged 25)		(Australia) Football Kingz
6	MF	Raf de Gregorio	20 May 1977 (aged 25)		(Scotland) Clyde
7	MF	Mark Burton	18 May 1974 (aged 28)		(Australia) Football Kingz
8	MF	Aaran Lines	21 December 1976 (aged 25)		(Germany) Dresdner SC
9	FW	Paul Urlovic	21 November 1978 (aged 23)		(Australia) Football Kingz
10	MF	Chris Jackson	18 July 1970 (aged 31)		(Australia) Football Kingz
11	FW	Chris Killen	8 October 1981 (aged 20)		(England) Oldham Athletic
12	MF	Simon Elliott	10 June 1974 (aged 28)		(United States) LA Galaxy
13	DF	Christian Bouckenooghe	7 February 1977 (aged 25)		(Belgium) KV Oostende
14	DF	Ryan Nelsen (c)	18 October 1977 (aged 24)		(United States) D.C. United
15	MF	Ivan Vicelich	3 September 1976 (aged 25)		(Netherlands) Roda JC
16	MF	Glen Collins	7 September 1977 (aged 24)		(United States) Greensboro College
17	MF	Jeff Campbell	25 August 1979 (aged 22)		(Australia) Football Kingz
18	DF	Scott Smith	6 March 1975 (aged 27)		(England) Woking
19	GK	James Bannatyne	30 June 1975 (aged 27)		(Australia) Football Kingz
20	DF	Gerard Davis	25 September 1977 (aged 24)		(Australia) Football Kingz

=== Papua New Guinea ===
Coach: (England) Steve Cain

No.	Pos.	Player	Date of birth (age)	Caps	Club
1	GK	Tapas Posman	16 October 1973 (aged 28)		(Papua New Guinea) Sobou
2	DF	Joe Aisa (c)	9 May 1971 (aged 31)		(Papua New Guinea) Guria
3	MF	Abraham Enoch	21 November 1981 (aged 20)		(Papua New Guinea) Port Moresby Cosmos
4	FW	Charlie Somasi	3 May 1969 (aged 33)		(Papua New Guinea) Sobou
5	DF	Paul Komboi	18 September 1976 (aged 25)		(Papua New Guinea) Unitech
6	DF	Fred Hans	27 June 1977 (aged 25)		(Papua New Guinea) Guria
7	MF	Desmond Sow			(Papua New Guinea) Sobou
8	DF	Jonah Malus			(Papua New Guinea) Rapatona
9	MF	Richard Daniel	2 April 1973 (aged 29)		(Papua New Guinea) Guria
10	MF	Reggie Davani	5 February 1980 (aged 22)		(Papua New Guinea) University Inter
11	MF	Selan Elizah	26 November 1971 (aged 30)		(Papua New Guinea) Guria
12	MF	Michael Lohai	14 February 1977 (aged 25)		(Papua New Guinea) PS United
13	DF	Elias Piawari			(Papua New Guinea) Unitech
14	FW	Francis Moiyap	18 October 1966 (aged 35)		(Papua New Guinea) Buresong
15	DF	Alu Kamake			(Papua New Guinea) Sobou
16	DF	Yanding Tomda	13 September 1977 (aged 24)		(Papua New Guinea) Unitech
17	MF	Ken Gule			(Papua New Guinea) Buresong
18	MF	Nasa Wangu			(Papua New Guinea) Blue Kumuls
19	MF	Steven Mali	30 June 1975 (aged 27)		(Papua New Guinea) Rapatona
20	GK	David Aua	11 February 1983 (aged 19)		(Papua New Guinea) PS United

=== Solomon Islands ===
Coach: (Scotland) George Cowie

No.	Pos.	Player	Date of birth (age)	Caps	Club
1	GK	Severino Aefi	15 October 1970 (aged 31)		(Solomon Islands) Las United
2	DF	Saeni Daudau	4 September 1978 (aged 23)		(Solomon Islands) Koloale
3	DF	Mahlon Houkarawa	23 April 1976 (aged 26)		(Solomon Islands) Koloale
4	DF	George Suri	16 July 1982 (aged 19)		(New Zealand) East Coast Bays
5	MF	Richard Ruakome	10 December 1985 (aged 16)		(Solomon Islands) Marist FC
6	DF	Martin Ruhasia	24 November 1977 (aged 24)		(Solomon Islands) Marist Fire
7	FW	Timothy Paoka	25 April 1974 (aged 28)		(Solomon Islands) Soloso F.C.
8	DF	Leslie Leo	2 August 1976 (aged 25)		(Solomon Islands) Lauga
9	FW	Commins Menapi	18 September 1977 (aged 24)		(Australia) Sydney United
10	FW	Batram Suri (c)	2 November 1971 (aged 30)		(New Zealand) YoungHeart Manawatu
11	MF	Patterson Daudau	2 February 1978 (aged 24)		(Solomon Islands) Malaita Eagles
12	MF	Vivian Wickham	12 June 1982 (aged 20)		(Australia) Toowoomba Raiders
13	DF	Jerry Allen	21 March 1979 (aged 23)		(Solomon Islands) Marist Fire
14	MF	Stanley Waita	10 October 1979 (aged 22)		(Solomon Islands) Malaita Eagles
15	MF	Jack Samani	7 May 1979 (aged 23)		(Solomon Islands) Marist Fire
16	MF	Henry Koto	28 September 1972 (aged 29)		(Solomon Islands) Laugu
17	DF	Gideon Omokirio	12 October 1976 (aged 25)		(Solomon Islands) Laugu
18	FW	Henry Fa'arodo	5 October 1982 (aged 19)		(Australia) Fawkner Blues
19	DF	David Firisua	12 July 1981 (aged 20)		(Solomon Islands) Laugu
20	GK	Fred Hale	17 July 1979 (aged 22)		(Solomon Islands) Koloale

=== Tahiti ===
Coach: Patrick Jacquemet

No.	Pos.	Player	Date of birth (age)	Caps	Club
1	GK	Jimmy Tahutini	10 November 1977 (aged 24)		(French Polynesia) AS Vénus
2	DF	Steve Fatupua-Lecaill	12 January 1976 (aged 26)		(French Polynesia) AS Vénus
3	DF	Iotua Kautai	1 January 1983 (aged 19)		(French Polynesia) AS Pirae
4	DF	Vehia Maurirere	10 November 1972 (aged 29)		(French Polynesia) AS Tefana
5	DF	Sylvain Booene	31 January 1968 (aged 34)		(French Polynesia) AS Dragon
6	MF	Tetahio Auraa	9 July 1973 (aged 28)		(French Polynesia) AS Manu-Ura
7	DF	Samuel Garcia	2 October 1975 (aged 26)		(French Polynesia) AS Vénus
8	MF	Teva Zaveroni	10 October 1975 (aged 26)		(French Polynesia) AS Pirae
9	FW	Félix Tagawa	23 March 1976 (aged 26)		(French Polynesia) AS Vénus
10	FW	Tony Senechal	4 March 1977 (aged 25)		(French Polynesia) AS Central Sport
11	FW	Naea Bennett	8 July 1977 (aged 24)		(French Polynesia) AS Vénus
12	DF	Harry Tong Sang	12 September 1982 (aged 19)		(French Polynesia) AS Dragon
13	MF	Abel Terevarua	2 February 1976 (aged 26)		(French Polynesia) AS Tiare
14	MF	Geiamano Guyon	14 November 1974 (aged 27)		(French Polynesia) AS Jeunes Tahitiens
15	MF	Larry Marmouyet	26 November 1980 (aged 21)		(French Polynesia) AS Tefana
16	GK	Daniel Tapeta	25 October 1974 (aged 27)		(French Polynesia) AS Manu-Ura
17	DF	Angelo Tchen	8 March 1982 (aged 20)		(French Polynesia) AS Tefana
18	FW	Raimoana Bennett	15 February 1981 (aged 21)		(French Polynesia) AS Pirae
19	FW	Gabriel Wajoka	7 November 1977 (aged 24)		(French Polynesia) AS Tiare
20	GK	Xavier Samin	1 January 1978 (aged 24)		(French Polynesia) AS Tefana

== Player representation ==
=== By club nationality ===
Players	Clubs
30	Australia
20	Papua New Guinea, (French Polynesia) Tahiti
19	New Caledonia, Vanuatu
17	Fiji
13	Solomon Islands
4	United States
2	England, New Zealand
1	Belgium, Finland, Germany, Netherlands, Scotland, Singapore, Switzerland

Nations in italics are not represented by their national teams in the finals.

=== By representatives of domestic league ===
National Squad	No.
Australia	19
Fiji	17
New Caledonia	19
New Zealand	1
Papua New Guinea	20
Solomon Islands	13
Tahiti	20
Vanuatu	19
