= 2020 New Caledonia Super Ligue =

Tournament details
- Country: New Caledonia
- Dates: 14 March – 19 December 2020
- Teams: 10

Final positions
- Champions: AS Tiga Sport
- Runners-up: AS Horizon Patho

Tournament statistics
- Matches played: 51
- Goals scored: 172 (3.37 per match)

The 2020 New Caledonia Super Ligue is the 47th season of the New Caledonia Super Ligue, the top-flight football league in New Caledonia. The season started on 14 March 2020. However, it was suspended after the first round due to the COVID-19 pandemic. The season resumed on 11 July 2020 and would be extended to play until 2021. However, it ended in December 2020. Hienghène Sport are the defending champions.

On 7 November, under new direction, FCF suggested changing the format of the ongoing competition. Thus, it was agreed that the regular phase would end with 9 rounds and none of the teams would be relegated. And to define the champion and the classifieds for the OFC Champions League, it was adding a playoff among the top 4. The proposal was accepted before round 9 was held. It was also agreed that the 2021 edition will have 13 participating clubs. Because, in addition to the 10 participants in this edition (since no club has been demoted), the three promoted from the 2020 edition of the lower division will be included.

== Teams ==
A total of ten teams compete in the league:

- JS Baco
- Hienghène Sport
- AS Horizon Patho
- AS Kunié
- AS Lössi
- AS Magenta
- AS Mont-Dore
- SC Ne Drehu
- AS Tiga Sport
- AS Wetr

Trio Kedeigne and Wacaelé were relegated from last season, and were replaced by promoted teams Baco and Kunié.

== Regular Stage ==
=== Table ===
Note: 4 points for a win, 2 points for a draw, 1 point for a defeat.

Pos	Team	Pld	W	D	L	GF	GA	GD	Pts	Qualification or relegation
1	AS Tiga Sport	9	6	2	1	23	9	+14	29	Qualification to 2022 OFC Champions League group stage
2	Hienghène Sport	9	6	1	2	23	14	+9	28	Qualification to 2022 OFC Champions League group stage
3	AS Magenta	9	5	3	1	25	11	+14	27	
4	AS Horizon Patho	9	5	2	2	21	18	+3	26	
5	Wetr	9	4	3	2	25	14	+11	24	
6	SC Ne Drehu	9	2	5	2	12	12	0	20	
7	AS Mont-Dore (Note: Mont-Dore deducted 1 point (no show in round 2).)	9	2	4	3	12	16	−4	18	
8	AS Lössi	9	2	2	5	16	16	0	17	
9	JS Baco	9	1	0	8	7	30	−23	12	Qualification to Relegation playoff
10	AS Kunié	9	0	2	7	8	31	−23	11	Relegation to New Caledonia Ligue 2

Updated to match(es) played on 3 March 2021. Source: Fedcalfoot

=== Matches ===
==== Round 1 ====
14 [Mar]

Magenta 6-0 Kunié

Tiga 2-0 Mont-Dore

Baco 0-4 Wetr

Hienghène 5-1 Horizon Patho

Ne Drehu 2-1 Lössi

==== Round 2 ====
[11 Jul]

Kunié 1-6 Lössi

Tiga 1-2 Magenta

Hienghène awd Mont-Dore [awarded 3–0, Mont-Dore forfeited]

[12 Jul]

Wetr 2-2 Ne Drehu

[18 Jul]

Horizon Patho 4-0 Baco

==== Round 3 ====
[25 Jul]

Mont-Dore 2-2 Horizon Patho

Baco 1-2 Ne Drehu

Magenta 3-2 Hienghène

[Jul 26]

Wetr 3-3 Kunié

Lössi 1-3 Tiga

==== Round 4 ====
[8 Aug] Lössi 1-2 Hienghène

Tiga 1-0 Wetr

[9 Aug]

Kunié 1-2 Baco

Mont-Dore 3-3 Magenta

[15 Aug]

Horizon Patho 3-2 Ne Drehu

==== Round 5 ====
[22 Aug]

Wetr 4-4 Hienghène

Lössi 1-1 Mont-Dore

Horizon Patho 2-1 Magenta

Baco 1-5 Tiga

[23 Aug]

Kunié 1-1 Ne Drehu

==== Round 6 ====
[19 Sep]

Magenta 1-1 Lössi

Wetr 4-0 Mont-Dore

Hienghène 3-1 Baco

Horizon Patho 3-0 Kunié

[20 Sep]

Tiga 1-1 Ne Drehu

==== Round 7 ====
[24 Oct]

Lössi 1-3 Horizon Patho

Hienghène 1-0 Ne Drehu

Wetr 0-1 Magenta

[25 Oct]

Kunié 1-5 Tiga

Mont-Dore 2-0 Baco

==== Round 8 ====
[7 Nov]

Tiga 2-2 Horizon Patho

Hienghène 2-1 Kunié

Mont-Dore 1-1 Ne Drehu

[8 Nov]

Magenta 7-1 Baco

Lössi 2-3 Wetr

==== Round 9 ====
[21 Nov]

Tiga 3-1 Hienghène

Mont-Dore 3-0 Kunié

[22 Nov]

Magenta 1-1 Ne Drehu

Wetr 5-1 Horizon Patho

Baco 1-2 Lössi

== Playoff Stage ==
=== Table ===
Note: 4 points for a win, 2 points for a draw, 1 point for a defeat.

Pos	Team	Pld	W	D	L	GF	GA	GD	Pts	Status
1	AS Tiga Sport	3	2	1	0	6	2	+4	10	Champion
2	AS Horizon Patho	3	1	1	1	4	5	−1	7	
3	Hienghène Sport	3	0	2	1	6	7	−1	5	
4	AS Magenta	3	0	2	1	3	5	−2	5	

Updated to match(es) played on 5 Mars 2021. Source: RSSF

=== Matches ===
==== Round 1 ====
[29 Nov, stade Numa Daly, Nouméa]

Hienghène 2-2 Tiga

Horizon Patho 1-1 Magenta

==== Round 2 ====
[5 Dec, stade Numa Daly, Nouméa]

Tiga 2-0 Horizon Patho

Hienghène 2-2 Magenta

==== Round 3 ====
[19 Dec, stade Yoshida, Koné]

Tiga 2-0 Magenta

Hienghène 2-3 Horizon Patho

== Playoff clubs' stadiums ==
Team	Location	Stadium	Capacity
AS Tiga Sport	Nouméa	Stade Numa-Daly Magenta	10,000
AS Horizon Patho	Maré	Stade La Roche	3,000
Hienghène Sport	Hienghène	Stade de Hienghène	1,800
AS Magenta	Nouméa	Stade Numa-Daly Magenta	10,000
