= List of football clubs in New Caledonia =

The following is a list of football clubs in New Caledonia.

In recent years, football clubs such as AS Mont-Dore from New Caledonia have sent a large number of players to international tournaments such as the FIFA U-17 World Cup.

== Clubs ==
- AS Kunié
- AS Lössi
- AS Magenta (Nouméa)
- AS Mont-Dore
- Gaïtcha FCN
- Hienghène Sport
- JS Baco
- Mouli Sport
- SC Ne Drehu
