= Bertrand Kaï =

New Caledonian footballer (born 1983)

Personal information
- Full name: Bertrand Patrice Charles Kaï
- Date of birth: 6 June 1983 (age 43)
- Place of birth: Hienghène, New Caledonia
- Height: 1.76 m (5 ft 9 in)
- Position: Forward

Team information
- Current team: Hienghène Sport
- Number: 11

Senior career*
| Years | Team | Apps | (Gls) |
| 2007–2013 | Hienghène Sport | | (33) |
| 2013–2014 | Magenta | 12 | (2) |
| 2014–2015 | Gaïtcha | 14 | (3) |
| 2015– | Hienghène Sport | | (18) |

International career^{‡}
| 2008–2022 | New Caledonia | 43 | (23) |
Medal record
Men's football
Representing New Caledonia
OFC Nations Cup
| Runner-up | 2008 Oceania |
| Runner-up | 2012 Solomon Islands |
Pacific Games
| Gold medal – first place | 2011 New Caledonia |
| Silver medal – second place | 2019 Samoa |
- * Club domestic league appearances and goals as of 19 December 2022 ‡ National team caps and goals as of 23 March 2023

Bertrand Patrice Charles Kaï (born 6 June 1983) is a New Caledonian professional footballer who plays as a forward for Hienghène Sport. He is one of only two New Caledonians to be named Oceania Footballer of the Year.

== International career ==
Kaï made his debut for New Caledonia on 14 June 2008 in the 0–0 draw against Vanuatu.

Kaï was called up to New Caledonia's squad for the 2011 Pacific Games. He was the tournament's top scorer with ten goals. Half of Kaï's goal tally for the tournament came in one match, the 9–0 win over Guam on 30 August 2011. He scored all ten of his goals in the group stage before also featuring in the semi-final win over Tahiti and the 2–0 victory over the Solomon Islands in the final.

On 1 June 2012, Kaï scored a hat-trick in New Caledonia's opening game at the 2012 OFC Nations Cup, a 5–2 victory over Vanuatu. He featured in both of New Caledonia's other group stage fixtures but was used sparingly in each game, being substituted at half-time in the 4–3 defeat to Tahiti on 3 June and being introduced from the bench in the second half against Samoa in a 9–0 win on 5 June.

On 8 June, he scored New Caledonia's first goal in a 2–0 win over New Zealand in the semi-final, helping his country to the second Nations Cup final in their history. Kaï played the entirety of the final against Tahiti on 10 June but was unable to prevent a 1–0 loss as New Caledonia finished as runners-up. With four goals, Kaï was the tournament's joint-third top-scorer, tied with Benjamin Totori of the Solomon Islands and Tahiti's Jonathan and Alvin Tehau.

Following his showing at the 2011 Pacific Games and the 2012 OFC Nations Cup, in July 2012 the Oceania Football Confederation announced that Kaï had won the men's Oceania Footballer of the Year award, beating fellow nine fellow nominees including New Zealand's Shane Smeltz and Chris Wood, and Jean Kaltack of Vanuatu. Kaï became only the second footballer from New Caledonia to win the award, following Christian Karembeu's titles in 1995 and 1998, and the first player from the Pacific Islands to be named Oceania's best player since 2005.

Speaking shortly after winning the award, Kaï admitted he was surprised to have beaten off such fierce competition to win the title, saying "To be honest, I couldn't believe [I had won] – it was a real surprise when it was announced. It was only afterwards that I realised what [an] honour it is to have been elected ahead of professional footballers from New Zealand, and I am very proud to have followed in the footsteps of Christian Karembeu...this trophy is also good for New Caledonia football because it shows we have talented players. I would like to thank the football family in my country because without them I could not have reached this level."

In December 2012, Kaï was named New Caledonia's joint Player of the Year along with Patrick Wajoka in the inaugural Football Oscars; both attained 22.38% of the vote in national newspaper Les Nouvelles Calédoniennes. Kaï was also included in the New Caledonian Football Federation's "Team of the Year".

== Career statistics ==
=== Club ===
As of 27 September 2025

Appearances and goals by club, season and competition
| Club | Season | League | | | Cup | | Continental | | Other | | Total | |
| Club | Season | Division | Apps | Goals | Apps | Goals | Apps | Goals | Apps | Goals | Apps | Goals |
|---|---|---|---|---|---|---|---|---|---|---|---|---|
| Hienghène Sport | 2007–08 | Super Ligue | | | | | | | | | | |
| Hienghène Sport | 2008–09 | Super Ligue | | 11 | | | | | | | | |
| Hienghène Sport | 2009 | Super Ligue | | 11 | | | | | | | | |
| Hienghène Sport | 2010 | Super Ligue | | 11 | | | | | | | | |
| Hienghène Sport | 2011 | Super Ligue | | | | | | | | | | |
| Hienghène Sport | 2012 | Super Ligue | | | | | | | | | | |
| Hienghène Sport | Total | | | | | | | | | | | |
| Magenta | 2013 | Super Ligue | 12 | 2 | | | 2 (Note: Appearances in OFC Champions League) | 2 | | | | |
| Gaïca | 2014 | Super Ligue | 14 | 3 | | | 4 | 3 | | | | |
| Hienghène Sport | 2015 | Super Ligue | 11 | 4 | | | | | | | | |
| Hienghène Sport | 2016 | Super Ligue | | | | | | | | | | |
| Hienghène Sport | 2017 | Super Ligue | | | | | 3 | 4 | | | | |
| Hienghène Sport | 2018 | Super Ligue | | | | | | | | | | |
| Hienghène Sport | 2019 | Super Ligue | | | | | 6 | 4 | | | | |
| Hienghène Sport | 2020 | Super Ligue | | | | | 2 | 0 | | | | |
| Hienghène Sport | 2021 | Super Ligue | | | | | | | | | | |
| Hienghène Sport | 2022 | Super Ligue | | | | | 6 | 2 | | | | |
| Hienghène Sport | 2023 | Super Ligue | | | | | 2 | 0 | | | | |
| Hienghène Sport | Total | | | | | | | | | | | |
| Career total | | | | | | | | | | | | |

=== International ===
Scores and results list New Caledonia's goal tally first, score column indicates score after each Kaï goal.

List of international goals scored by Bertrand Kaï
| No. | Date | Venue | Opponent | Score | Result | Competition |
|---|---|---|---|---|---|---|
| 1 | 3 October 2008 | Stade Marville, Saint-Malo, France | Mayotte | 2–2 | 3–2 | 2008 Coupe de l'Outre-Mer |
| 2 | 30 August 2011 | Stade Rivière Salée, Nouméa, New Caledonia | Guam | 1–0 | 9–0 | 2011 Pacific Games |
| 3 | 30 August 2011 | Stade Rivière Salée, Nouméa, New Caledonia | Guam | 2–0 | 9–0 | 2011 Pacific Games |
| 4 | 30 August 2011 | Stade Rivière Salée, Nouméa, New Caledonia | Guam | 3–0 | 9–0 | 2011 Pacific Games |
| 5 | 30 August 2011 | Stade Rivière Salée, Nouméa, New Caledonia | Guam | 4–0 | 9–0 | 2011 Pacific Games |
| 6 | 30 August 2011 | Stade Rivière Salée, Nouméa, New Caledonia | Guam | 9–0 | 9–0 | 2011 Pacific Games |
| 7 | 3 September 2011 | Stade Rivière Salée, Nouméa, New Caledonia | American Samoa | 1–0 | 8–0 | 2011 Pacific Games |
| 8 | 3 September 2011 | Stade Rivière Salée, Nouméa, New Caledonia | American Samoa | 2–0 | 8–0 | 2011 Pacific Games |
| 9 | 3 September 2011 | Stade Rivière Salée, Nouméa, New Caledonia | American Samoa | 3–0 | 8–0 | 2011 Pacific Games |
| 10 | 3 September 2011 | Stade Rivière Salée, Nouméa, New Caledonia | American Samoa | 6–0 | 8–0 | 2011 Pacific Games |
| 11 | 5 September 2011 | Stade Rivière Salée, Nouméa, New Caledonia | Solomon Islands | 1–1 | 1–2 | 2011 Pacific Games |
| 12 | 1 June 2012 | Lawson Tama Stadium, Honiara, Solomon Islands | Vanuatu | 1–0 | 5–2 | 2012 OFC Nations Cup |
| 13 | 1 June 2012 | Lawson Tama Stadium, Honiara, Solomon Islands | Vanuatu | 2–1 | 5–2 | 2012 OFC Nations Cup |
| 14 | 1 June 2012 | Lawson Tama Stadium, Honiara, Solomon Islands | Vanuatu | 4–2 | 5–2 | 2012 OFC Nations Cup |
| 15 | 8 June 2012 | Lawson Tama Stadium, Honiara, Solomon Islands | New Zealand | 1–0 | 2–0 | 2012 OFC Nations Cup |
| 16 | 12 September 2012 | Stade Pater Te Hono Nui, Pirae, Tahiti | Tahiti | 2–0 | 4–0 | 2014 FIFA World Cup qualification |
| 17 | 26 March 2016 | Port Vila Municipal Stadium, Port Vila, Vanuatu | Vanuatu | 1–0 | 1–2 | Friendly |
| 18 | 5 June 2016 | Sir John Guise Stadium, Port Moresby, Papua New Guinea | Tahiti | 1–0 | 1–1 | 2016 OFC Nations Cup |
| 19 | 5 October 2016 | Lawson Tama Stadium, Honiara, Solomon Islands | Solomon Islands | 1–0 | 3–0 | Friendly |
| 20 | 5 October 2016 | Lawson Tama Stadium, Honiara, Solomon Islands | Solomon Islands | 3–0 | 3–0 | Friendly |
| 21 | 8 October 2016 | Lawson Tama Stadium, Honiara, Solomon Islands | Solomon Islands | 1–0 | 1–0 | Friendly |
| 22 | 8 July 2019 | National Soccer Stadium, Apia | American Samoa | 2–0 | 5–0 | 2019 Pacific Games |
| 23 | 8 July 2019 | National Soccer Stadium, Apia | American Samoa | 3–0 | 5–0 | 2019 Pacific Games |

== Honours ==
=== Player ===
Hienghène Sport

- New Caledonia Super Ligue: 2017, 2019
- New Caledonia Cup: 2013, 2015, 2019
- OFC Champions League: 2019

AS Magenta

- New Caledonia Super Ligue: 2014

New Caledonia

- OFC Nations Cup: Runner-up, 2008, 2012
- Pacific Games: Gold Medalist, 2011; Silver Medalist, 2019

=== Individual ===
- Pacific Games Golden Boot: 2011
- Oceania Footballer of the Year: 2011
- New Caledonian Football Federation Player of the Year: 2015
- OFC Champions League Golden Ball: 2019
