= 2023 MSG Prime Minister's Cup squads =

Below are the final squads for participating nations in the 2023 MSG Prime Minister's Cup to be held in Vanuatu from 8 to 15 October 2023.

== New Caledonia ==
Head coach: (France) Johann Sidaner

No.	Pos.	Player	Date of birth (age)	Club
1	GK	Rocky Nyikeine	May 26, 1992 (aged 31)	(New Caledonia) Hienghène Sport
16	GK	Mickaël Ulile	July 16, 1997 (aged 26)	(New Caledonia) Magenta
23	GK	Warren Hlupa	June 26, 1997 (aged 26)	(New Caledonia) Lössi
2	DF	Paul Gorou	March 25, 1998 (aged 25)	(New Caledonia) Magenta
3	DF	William Rokuad	October 3, 2001 (aged 22)	(New Caledonia) Magenta
4	DF	Vincent Vakie	October 20, 1990 (aged 32)	(New Caledonia) Kunié
5	DF	Bernard Iwa	May 16, 2000 (aged 23)	(New Caledonia) Lössi
6	DF	Pierre Wawia	March 13, 2000 (aged 23)	(New Caledonia) Tiga Sport
7	DF	Gianni Manmieu		(New Caledonia) Kunié
8	DF	Morgan Mathelon	September 12, 1991 (aged 32)	(New Caledonia) Tiga Sport
9	MF	Willy Read	January 11, 2003 (aged 20)	(New Caledonia) Lössi
10	MF	Pierre Bako	August 9, 2001 (aged 22)	(New Caledonia) Gaïca
11	MF	Fonzy Ranchain	July 22, 1994 (aged 29)	(New Caledonia) Hienghène Sport
12	MF	Shene Wélépane	December 9, 1997 (aged 25)	(New Caledonia) Tiga Sport
13	MF	Jules Omei	July 14, 2001 (aged 22)	(New Caledonia) Mont-Dore
14	MF	Gabriel Vakoume	February 9, 1989 (aged 34)	(New Caledonia) Kunié
15	MF	Gerard Waia		(New Caledonia) Tiga Sport
17	FW	Roberto Neoere	April 18, 1996 (aged 27)	(New Caledonia) Kunié
18	FW	Henri Welepane	April 19, 2000 (aged 23)	(New Caledonia) Tiga Sport
19	FW	Makalu Xowi	April 20, 1999 (aged 24)	(French Polynesia) Temanava
20	FW	Hector Waheo	January 28, 2004 (aged 19)	(New Caledonia) Mont-Dore
21	FW	Djibril Tufele	January 25, 2003 (aged 20)	(New Caledonia) Lössi
22	FW	Bernard Katrawa	May 27, 2003 (aged 20)	(New Caledonia) Lössi

== Papua New Guinea ==
Head coach: (Papua New Guinea) Harisson Kamake

No.	Pos.	Player	Date of birth (age)	Club
1	GK	Dave Tomare	April 26, 1997 (aged 26)	(Papua New Guinea) Hekari United
2	GK	Charles Lepani	August 20, 1994 (aged 29)	(Papua New Guinea) Lae City
3	DF	Abel Rednut	August 20, 1994 (aged 29)	(Papua New Guinea) Hekari United
4	DF	Phillip Steven	January 19, 1995 (aged 28)	(Papua New Guinea) Lae City
5	DF	Daniel Joe	May 29, 1990 (aged 33)	(Papua New Guinea) Hekari United
6	DF	Godfrey Haro	June 30, 1998 (aged 25)	(Papua New Guinea) Hekari United
7	DF	Sylvester Luke	December 12, 2000 (aged 22)	(Papua New Guinea) Besta PNG United
8	DF	Joshua Talau	April 19, 1996 (aged 27)	(Papua New Guinea) Lae City
9	MF	Emmanuel Simon	December 25, 1992 (aged 30)	(Papua New Guinea) Lae City
10	MF	Yagi Yasasa	August 17, 2000 (aged 23)	(Papua New Guinea) Hekari United
11	MF	Joseph Joe	June 14, 2002 (aged 21)	(Papua New Guinea) Hekari United
12	MF	Pala Paul	July 25, 1999 (aged 24)	(Papua New Guinea) Gulf Komara
13	MF	Oberth Simon	January 1, 2001 (aged 22)	(Papua New Guinea) Hekari United
14	FW	Ati Kepo	January 15, 1996 (aged 27)	(Papua New Guinea) Hekari United
15	FW	Kolu Kepo	July 15, 1993 (aged 30)	(Papua New Guinea) Hekari United
16	FW	Rex Naime	October 23, 2003 (aged 19)	(Papua New Guinea) Hekari United
17	FW	Raymond Gunemba	June 4, 1986 (aged 37)	(Fiji) Lautoka
18	FW	Nigel Dabinyaba	October 26, 1992 (aged 30)	(Papua New Guinea) Hekari United
19	FW	Santo Manu	July 25, 2002 (aged 21)	(Papua New Guinea) Gulf Komara
20	FW	Tommy Semmy	September 30, 1994 (aged 29)	(Australia) Altona Magic

== Solomon Islands ==
Head coach: (Spain) Felipe Vega-Arango

No.	Pos.	Player	Date of birth (age)	Club
	GK	Philip Mango	August 28, 1995 (aged 28)	(Solomon Islands) Central Coast
	GK	Timothy Mae'arasia	June 19, 1995 (aged 28)	(Solomon Islands) Solomon Warriors
	GK	Michael Laulae	May 20, 2002 (aged 21)	(Solomon Islands) Henderson Eels
	DF	Leoa Mani	June 2, 1989 (aged 34)	(Solomon Islands) Solomon Warriors
	DF	David Supa	December 21, 2000 (aged 22)	(Solomon Islands) Central Coast
	DF	Aengari Gagame	April 15, 2000 (aged 23)	(Solomon Islands) Solomon Warriors
	DF	Javin Wae	November 17, 2002 (aged 20)	(Solomon Islands) Central Coast
	DF	Leon Kofana	June 22, 2002 (aged 21)	(Solomon Islands) Henderson Eels
	DF	Alick Stanton	May 25, 1998 (aged 25)	(Solomon Islands) Central Coast
	DF	Allen Peter	September 11, 1995 (aged 28)	(Solomon Islands) Solomon Warriors
	DF	Calvin Ohasio	April 5, 2000 (aged 23)	(Solomon Islands) Marist
	MF	Molis Gagame	September 21, 1989 (aged 34)	(Solomon Islands) Kossa
	MF	William Komasi	June 10, 2000 (aged 23)	(Solomon Islands) Central Coast
	MF	Atkin Kaua	April 4, 1996 (aged 27)	(Solomon Islands) Laugu United
	MF	Tigi Molea	September 24, 1992 (aged 31)	(Solomon Islands) Solomon Warriors
	MF	Alvin Hou	September 18, 1996 (aged 27)	(Solomon Islands) Solomon Warriors
	MF	Joses Nawo	May 3, 1988 (aged 35)	(Solomon Islands) Kossa
	FW	Gagame Feni	August 21, 1992 (aged 31)	(Solomon Islands) Kossa
	FW	Norman Ngafu	July 16, 1997 (aged 26)	(Solomon Islands) Marist
	FW	Bobby Leslie	March 3, 2000 (aged 23)	(Solomon Islands) Waneagu United
	FW	John Orobulu		(Solomon Islands) Southern United
	FW	Junior Fordney	November 26, 1999 (aged 23)	(Solomon Islands) Central Coast
	FW	Raphael Lea'i	September 9, 2003 (aged 20)	(Bosnia and Herzegovina) Velež Mostar

== Vanuatu ==
Head coach: (Brazil) Emerson Alcântara

No.	Pos.	Player	Date of birth (age)	Club
1	GK	Massing Kalotang	August 26, 2002 (aged 21)	(Vanuatu) Yatel
9	GK	Dgen Leo	August 6, 2000 (aged 23)	(Vanuatu) Ruerue
2	DF	Tasso Jeffrey	August 12, 1998 (aged 25)	(Australia) FK Beograd
3	DF	Timothy Boulet	November 29, 1998 (aged 24)	(New Zealand) Auckland City
8	DF	Terry Thomas		(Vanuatu)
10	DF	Zidane Maguekon	June 3, 2000 (aged 23)	(Vanuatu) Vaum United
14	DF	Sylvain Worworbu	August 17, 1998 (aged 25)	(Vanuatu) Police FC
6	MF	Barry Mansale	November 1, 1995 (aged 27)	(Vanuatu) Yatel
7	MF	Raoul Coulon	December 3, 1995 (aged 27)	(Vanuatu) Yatel
11	MF	Tyson Gere	July 11, 2000 (aged 23)	(Vanuatu) VFF Academy
12	MF	John Alick	April 25, 1991 (aged 32)	(Solomon Islands) Solomon Warriors
13	MF	Dominique Fred	October 21, 1992 (aged 30)	(Vanuatu) Ifira Black Bird
16	MF	Elkington Molivakarua	March 3, 1993 (aged 30)	(Vanuatu) Ifira Black Bird
4	FW	Alex Saniel	November 8, 1996 (aged 26)	(Fiji) Suva
5	FW	Azariah Soromon	March 1, 1999 (aged 24)	(Fiji) Suva
15	FW	Rexly Butakol		(Vanuatu) Rainbow
17	FW	Reginold Ravo	August 25, 1997 (aged 26)	(Vanuatu) Yatel
18	FW	Jacky Numake		(Vanuatu) Tafea
