= Overseas France teams in the main competition of the Coupe de France =

The Coupe de France is a tournament in which all FFF affiliated teams can participate, including those from clubs from the overseas departments and territories (Guadeloupe, French Guiana, Martinique, Mayotte, New Caledonia, Tahiti, Réunion and Saint Pierre and Miquelon). This is the list of overseas teams that played a match in the main competition.

== Overview ==
The Coupe de France was opened to overseas teams from the 1961–62 season, with the entry of one team.

From the 1962–63 season to the 1972–73 season, two teams were admitted to the competition.

In the 1974–75 season, Martinican team Golden Star was the first overseas team to beat a team from mainland France and to reach the Round of 64.

In the 1988–89 season, French Guianese team ASC Le Geldar de Kourou was the first team to reach the Round of 32.

== Results ==
Matches of Overseas France teams in the main competition of the Coupe de France
| Season | Tie | Home team | Score | Away team |
|---|---|---|---|---|
| 1961–62 | Fifth Round | FC Dieppe | 3–2 | (Guadeloupe) CS Moulien |
| 1962–63 | Sixth Round | Stade Briochin | 7–1 | (Martinique) Stade Spiritain |
| 1963–64 | Sixth Round | (Martinique) Club Colonial | 0–3 | CA Montreuil |
| 1964–65 | Sixth Round | Hyères FC | 5–0 | (Guadeloupe) ASG Juventus |
| 1964–65 | Sixth Round | SSMC Miramas | 9–1 | (Réunion) JS Saint-Pierroise |
| 1965–66 | Sixth Round | (Martinique) Aiglon du Lamentin | 0–3 | US Quevilly |
| 1965–66 | Sixth Round | (Réunion) US Bénédictine | 1–6 | Gazélec Ajaccio |
| 1966–67 | Sixth Round | Olympique Saint-Germain | 14–0 | (Réunion) US Bénédictine |
| 1966–67 | Sixth Round | Red Star F.C. | 10–1 | (French Guiana) ASEA Saint-Georges |
| 1967–68 | Regional draws of Overseas France have been cancelled | | | |
| 1968–69 | Sixth Round | (Réunion) SS Jeanne d'Arc | 1–10 | Stade Malherbe Caen |
| 1968–69 | Sixth Round | (Martinique) CS Vauclinois | 1–2 | AC Cambrai |
| 1969–70 | Sixth Round | AC Arles | 4–0 | (Réunion) US Bénédictine |
| 1969–70 | Sixth Round | ES La Ciotat | 4–0 | (Martinique) CS Vauclinois |
| 1970–71 | Overseas teams did not participate | | | |
| 1971–72 | Sixth Round | (Guadeloupe) Équinoxe Petit-Canal | 0–2 | Olympique Alès |
| 1971–72 | Sixth Round | (Réunion) JS Saint-Pierroise | 1–2 | RC Épernay |
| 1972–73 | Seventh Round | Pays d'Aix FC | 2–1 | (Guadeloupe) AS Cygne Noir |
| 1972–73 | Seventh Round | UMS Montélimar | 2–1 | (Réunion) US Bénédictine |
| 1973–74 | Seventh Round | (Réunion) SS Patriote | 1–2 | Évreux AC |
| 1973–74 | Seventh Round | (Guadeloupe) ASG Juventus | 1–3 | AS Aulnoye |
| 1973–74 | Seventh Round | FCM Garges-lès-Gonesse | 2–1 | (Martinique) Olympique du Marin |
| 1973–74 | Seventh Round | AS Yerres | 3–0 | (French Guiana) ASL Le Sport Guyanais |
| 1974–75 | Seventh Round | (French Guiana) Olympique de Cayenne | 1–4 | JGA Nevers |
| 1974–75 | Seventh Round | (Martinique) Golden Star | 1–1 (a.e.t) | US Melun |
| 1974–75 | Seventh Round | (Martinique) Golden Star | 2–1 (rep.) | US Melun |
| 1974–75 | Seventh Round | USM Malakoff | 2–1 | (French Polynesia) ASCS Papeete |
| 1974–75 | Seventh Round | AS Orléans | 3–2 | (Guadeloupe) AS Red Star de Pointe-à-Pitre |
| 1974–75 | Seventh Round | AS Creil | 2–1 | (Réunion) AS Excelsior |
| 1974–75 | Round of 64 | OGC Nice | 8–0 | (Martinique) Golden Star |
| 1975–76 | Seventh Round | (Réunion) Saint-Denis FC | 2–1 | FC Libourne |
| 1975–76 | Seventh Round | AS Corbeil Essonnes | 3–0 | (New Caledonia) ASN Nouméa |
| 1975–76 | Seventh Round | ES Juvisy-sur-Orge | 2–1 | (Martinique) Golden Star |
| 1975–76 | Seventh Round | CS Meaux | 5–0 | (French Guiana) AJ Saint-Georges |
| 1975–76 | Round of 64 | EA de Guingamp | 4–0 | (Réunion) Saint-Denis FC |
| 1976–77 | Seventh Round | (French Guiana) Olympique de Cayenne | 0–1 | US Saint-Omer |
| 1976–77 | Seventh Round | (Martinique) AS Samaritaine | 1–3 (a.e.t) | ES La Rochelle |
| 1976–77 | Seventh Round | Villemomble Sports | 2–0 | (French Polynesia) ASCS Papeete |
| 1976–77 | Seventh Round | AS Mantes | 1–0 | (Réunion) JS Saint-Pierroise |
| 1977–78 | Seventh Round | (Réunion) JS Saint-Pierroise | 3–1 | FC Yonnais |
| 1977–78 | Seventh Round | (French Polynesia) ASCS Papeete | 1–2 | ES Viry-Châtillon |
| 1977–78 | Seventh Round | (Guadeloupe) L'Etoile de Morne-à-l'Eau | 0–2 | SO Pont-de-Chéruy |
| 1977–78 | Seventh Round | Red Star F.C. | 4–1 | (Martinique) RC Rivière-Pilote |
| 1977–78 | Seventh Round | CA de Mantes-la-Ville | 0–1 (a.e.t) | (French Guiana) CSC de Cayenne |
| 1977–78 | Round of 64 | (French Guiana) CSC de Cayenne | 0–4 | OSC Lille |
| 1977–78 | Round of 64 | AS Angoulême | 3–1 | (Réunion) JS Saint-Pierroise |
| 1978–79 | Seventh Round | (French Guiana) CSC de Cayenne | 0–1 | FCBN Fontainebleau |
| 1978–79 | Seventh Round | (Martinique) Good Luck | 3–1 | UES Montmorillon |
| 1978–79 | Seventh Round | (French Polynesia) ASCS Papeete | 3–0 | US Orléans Arago |
| 1978–79 | Seventh Round | AS Poissy | 0–1 | (French Guiana) La Gauloise |
| 1978–79 | Seventh Round | AS Beauvais Oise | 6–0 | (Réunion) AS Excelsior |
| 1978–79 | Round of 64 | US de Valenciennes | 12–0 | (French Polynesia) ASCS Papeete |
| 1978–79 | Round of 64 | FC Gueugnon | 2–0 | (Martinique) Good Luck |
| 1978–79 | Round of 64 | (French Guiana) La Gauloise | 0–3 (awarded) | FC Martigues |
| 1979–80 | Seventh Round | (Guadeloupe) ASC Red Star de Pointe-à-Pitre | 2–3 | Gazélec Ajaccio |
| 1979–80 | Seventh Round | (Réunion) USSA LES LEOPARDS | 1–3 | SC Abbeville |
| 1979–80 | Seventh Round | AJ Auxerre | 3–0 | (Martinique) Club Colonial |
| 1979–80 | Seventh Round | Stade de Reims | 4–2 | (French Polynesia) ASCS Papeete |
| 1979–80 | Seventh Round | Racing Club | 3–2 | (French Guiana) CSC de Cayenne |
| 1980–81 | Seventh Round | (French Guiana) AJ Saint-Georges | 0–0 (a.e.t) (7–6 p) | Véloce Vannetais |
| 1980–81 | Seventh Round | (Martinique) Club Péléen | 1–0 | Stade Français 92 |
| 1980–81 | Seventh Round | AS Poissy | 2–0 | (French Polynesia) JS Arue |
| 1980–81 | Seventh Round | Amiens SC | 3–1 (a.e.t) | (Réunion) Saint-Denis FC |
| 1980–81 | Seventh Round | Blois Football 41 | 1–2 | (Guadeloupe) CS Moulien |
| 1980–81 | Round of 64 | AS Nancy | 5–0 | (Martinique) Club Péléen |
| 1980–81 | Round of 64 | (French Guiana) AJ Saint-Georges | 1–2 | AEP Bourg-sous-la-Roche |
| 1980–81 | Round of 64 | (Guadeloupe) CS Moulien | 0–2 | CS Thonon |
| 1981–82 | Seventh Round | (Guadeloupe) AS Cygne Noir | 1–1 (3–4 p) | FCAS Grenoble |
| 1981–82 | Seventh Round | (French Polynesia) ASCS Papeete | 4–2 (a.e.t) | AS Béziers |
| 1981–82 | Seventh Round | (Réunion) US Bénédictine | 0–1 | USM Malakoff |
| 1981–82 | Seventh Round | Le Havre AC | 2–0 | (Martinique) RC Rivière-Pilote |
| 1981–82 | Seventh Round | Red Star F.C. | 3–2 | (French Guiana) USL Montjoly |
| 1981–82 | Round of 64 | (French Polynesia) ASCS Papeete | 1–2 | CS Thonon |
| 1982–83 | Seventh Round | (French Guiana) ASL Le Sport Guyanais | 0–1 | Angers SCO |
| 1982–83 | Seventh Round | (Martinique) Club Franciscain | 2–1 | Montpellier HSC |
| 1982–83 | Seventh Round | (New Caledonia) USL Gélima Canala | 0–1 | Red Star F.C. |
| 1982–83 | Seventh Round | Racing Club | 4–1 | (Guadeloupe) L'Etoile de Morne-à-l'Eau |
| 1982–83 | Seventh Round | EA de Guingamp | 4–0 | (French Polynesia) ASCS Papeete |
| 1982–83 | Seventh Round | US Melun | 3–0 | (Réunion) Saint-Denis FC |
| 1982–83 | Round of 64 | (Martinique) Club Franciscain | 1–5 | Gazélec Ajaccio |
| 1983–84 | Seventh Round | (Guadeloupe) AS Cygne Noir | 0–4 | US Maubeuge |
| 1983–84 | Seventh Round | (Réunion) Saint-Denis FC | 1–4 (a.e.t) | CO Saint-Dizier |
| 1983–84 | Seventh Round | Stade de Reims | 2–0 | (Martinique) Club Colonial |
| 1983–84 | Seventh Round | UCK Vannes | 2–0 | (French Guiana) ASC Le Geldar de Kourou |
| 1983–84 | Seventh Round | SC Abbeville | 3–2 | (New Caledonia) CS Saint-Louis |
| 1984–85 | Eighth Round | (French Guiana) USL Montjoly | 0–1 | Chamois Niortais |
| 1984–85 | Eighth Round | (Martinique) Excelsior FC | 1–2 | AS Beauvais-Marissel |
| 1984–85 | Eighth Round | (Guadeloupe) L'Etoile de Morne-à-l'Eau | 0–1 | AS Saint-Étienne |
| 1984–85 | Eighth Round | Red Star F.C. | 1–0 | (French Polynesia) ASPTT Papeete |
| 1984–85 | Eighth Round | ES Viry-Châtillon | 4–3 (a.e.t) | (Réunion) FCO Savanna |
| 1985–86 | Eighth Round | (Guadeloupe) CS Saint-François | 0–1 | FC Chalonnais |
| 1985–86 | Eighth Round | (French Polynesia) ASCS Papeete | 1–2 | FC Rouen |
| 1985–86 | Eighth Round | (Réunion) Saint-Denis FC | 0–1 | CO Le Puy |
| 1985–86 | Eighth Round | Tours FC | 6–0 | (Martinique) L'Assaut de Saint-Pierre |
| 1985–86 | Eighth Round | (French Guiana) ASL Le Sport Guyanais | 0–2 | SM Caen |
| 1986–87 | Eighth Round | (French Guiana) ASJ Mana | 1–2 | FC Lorient |
| 1986–87 | Eighth Round | (Martinique) JA Trénelle | 2–1 | EA de Guingamp |
| 1986–87 | Eighth Round | (New Caledonia) CA Saint-Louis | 1–2 | AS Cannes |
| 1986–87 | Eighth Round | (Guadeloupe) SS de Pointe-à-Pitre | 0–2 | SC Bastia |
| 1986–87 | Eighth Round | (Réunion) SS Saint-Pauloise | 1–4 | AS Beauvais-Marissel |
| 1986–87 | Round of 64 | (Martinique) JA Trénelle | 1–3 | RC Strasbourg |
| 1987–88 | Eighth Round | (Guadeloupe) CS Moulien | 0–2 | AEP Bourg-sous-la-Roche |
| 1987–88 | Eighth Round | (Réunion) CS Saint-Denis | 1–6 | Valenciennes FC |
| 1987–88 | Eighth Round | (Martinique) RC Gros-Morne | 1–2 | AS Nancy |
| 1987–88 | Eighth Round | (French Polynesia) A.S. Jeunes Tahitiens | 0–4 | FC Montceau Bourgogne |
| 1987–88 | Eighth Round | (French Guiana) AS Cayenne | 0–2 | US Créteil-Lusitanos |
| 1988–89 | Eighth Round | (Martinique) JA Trénelle | 1–6 | US Orléans |
| 1988–89 | Eighth Round | (French Guiana) ASC Le Geldar de Kourou | 1–1 (5–4 p) | Entente Chaumontaise AC |
| 1988–89 | Eighth Round | (French Polynesia) ASCS Papeete | 0–4 | US Concarneau |
| 1988–89 | Eighth Round | (Guadeloupe) L'Etoile de Morne-à-l'Eau | 0–1 | Quimper Kerfeunteun F.C. |
| 1988–89 | Eighth Round | (Réunion) FCO Savanna | 2–3 | FC Grenoble Dauphiné |
| 1988–89 | Round of 64 | (French Guiana) ASC Le Geldar de Kourou | 2–1 | FC Sens |
| 1988–89 | Round of 32 | (French Guiana) ASC Le Geldar de Kourou | 0–3 | Nantes |
| 1988–89 | Round of 32 | Nantes | 8–0 | (French Guiana) ASC Le Geldar de Kourou |
| 1988–89 | Round of 32 | Nantes won 11–0 on aggregate. | | |
| 1989–90 | Eighth Round | (Réunion) JS Saint-Pierroise | 1–1 (4–1 p) | Le Mans |
| 1989–90 | Eighth Round | Nîmes Olympique | 3–0 | (French Polynesia) A.S. Pirae |
| 1989–90 | Eighth Round | RC Lens | 1–0 | (Martinique) Real de Tartane |
| 1989–90 | Eighth Round | Red Star F.C. | 2–0 | (French Guiana) ASL Le Sport Guyanais |
| 1989–90 | Round of 64 | (Réunion) JS Saint-Pierroise | 1–2 | Clermont-Ferrand Football Club |
| 1990–91 | Eighth Round | (French Guiana) SC Kouroucien | 0–3 | US Avranches |
| 1990–91 | Eighth Round | (Martinique) Excelsior FC | 0–2 | AS Saint-Seurin |
| 1990–91 | Eighth Round | (French Polynesia) A.S. Pirae | 0–4 | Avenir Club Avignonnais |
| 1990–91 | Eighth Round | (Guadeloupe) SS de Pointe-à-Pitre | 1–2 | Tours |
| 1990–91 | Eighth Round | (Réunion) CS Saint-Denis | 0–5 | Rouen |
| 1991–92 | Eighth Round | (Guadeloupe) ASC Red Star de Pointe-à-Pitre | 0–1 | FC Perpignan |
| 1991–92 | Eighth Round | (Réunion) JS Gauloise | 0–3 | Association Troyes AC |
| 1991–92 | Eighth Round | Istres Sports | 4–0 | (French Polynesia) A.S. Vénus |
| 1991–92 | Eighth Round | (Martinique) Aiglon du Lamentin | 0–4 | Gazélec Ajaccio |
| 1991–92 | Eighth Round | (French Guiana) CSC de Cayenne | 1–2 | FC Bourges |
| 1992–93 | Eighth Round | (French Guiana) ASJ de Mana | 0–5 | USL Dunkerque |
| 1992–93 | Eighth Round | (Martinique) Club Franciscain | 2–1 | FC Bourges |
| 1992–93 | Eighth Round | (French Polynesia) A.S. Pirae | 0–1 | AS Nancy |
| 1992–93 | Eighth Round | Stade Rennais F.C. | 4–0 | (Guadeloupe) L'Etoile de Morne-à-l'Eau |
| 1992–93 | Eighth Round | Cannes | 6–0 | (Réunion) La Tamponnaise |
| 1992–93 | Round of 64 | (Martinique) Club Franciscain | 1–2 | Chamois Niortais |
| 1993–94 | Seventh Round | (Réunion) US Possession | 2–1 (a.e.t) | SCO Roubaix |
| 1993–94 | Seventh Round | (Guadeloupe) ASC Red Star de Pointe-à-Pitre | 1–0 | La Roche VF |
| 1993–94 | Seventh Round | (French Guiana) ASL Le Sport Guyanais | 0–9 | ESA Brive |
| 1993–94 | Seventh Round | (Martinique) La Gauloise de Trinité | 0–3 | FC Lorient |
| 1993–94 | Seventh Round | (French Polynesia) A.S. Pirae | 0–2 | SAS Épinal |
| 1993–94 | Eighth Round | CS Sedan Ardennes | 1–0 (a.e.t) | (Réunion) US Possession |
| 1993–94 | Eighth Round | Nîmes Olympique | 1–0 | (Guadeloupe) ASC Red Star de Pointe-à-Pitre |
| 1994–95 | Seventh Round | (Martinique) Club Franciscain | 2–1 | ESA Brive |
| 1994–95 | Seventh Round | (New Caledonia) US Magenta | 0–1 (a.e.t) | Stade de Vallauris |
| 1994–95 | Seventh Round | (French Polynesia) A.S. Pirae | 2–6 | Stade Poitevin PEPP |
| 1994–95 | Seventh Round | La Roche VF | 2–0 | (Guadeloupe) L'Etoile de Morne-à-l'Eau |
| 1994–95 | Seventh Round | SAS Épinal | 1–3 | (Réunion) AS Saint-Louisienne |
| 1994–95 | Eighth Round | Red Star F.C. | 5–0 | (Martinique) Club Franciscain |
| 1994–95 | Eighth Round | (Réunion) AS Saint-Louisienne | 1–1 (a.e.t) (4–2 p) | Chamois Niortais |
| 1994–95 | Round of 64 | (Réunion) AS Saint-Louisienne | 0–2 | AS Cannes |
| 1995–96 | Seventh Round | (Guadeloupe) AC de Petit-Bourg | 0–1 | US Avranches |
| 1995–96 | Seventh Round | (French Polynesia) A.S. Vénus | 1–4 (a.e.t) | Olympique Noisy-le-Sec |
| 1995–96 | Seventh Round | (Réunion) AS Saint-Louisienne | 1–0 | La Roche VF |
| 1995–96 | Seventh Round | Stade Brestois 29 | 3–1 | (French Guiana) US Macouria |
| 1995–96 | Seventh Round | FC Sète 34 | 2–0 (a.e.t) | (Martinique) US Robert |
| 1995–96 | Seventh Round | SC de Toulon 83 | 7–0 | (New Caledonia) CA Saint-Louis |
| 1995–96 | Eighth Round | AS Nancy | 3–1 | (Réunion) AS Saint-Louisienne |
| 1996–97 | Seventh Round | (French Guiana) AJ Saint-Georges | 1–2 | US Avranches |
| 1996–97 | Seventh Round | (Martinique) Club Franciscain | 2–2 (a.e.t) (4–3 p) | Trélissac FC |
| 1996–97 | Seventh Round | (New Caledonia) CA Saint-Louis | 1–3 | Nîmes Olympique |
| 1996–97 | Seventh Round | Wasquehal Football | 3–0 | (Guadeloupe) L'Etoile de Morne-à-l'Eau |
| 1996–97 | Seventh Round | ES Vitrolles | 2–1 | (Réunion) AS Saint-Louisienne |
| 1996–97 | Seventh Round | AS Saint-Priest | 3–2 (a.e.t) | (French Polynesia) A.S. Pirae |
| 1996–97 | Eighth Round | ASOA Valence | 2–0 | (Martinique) Club Franciscain |
| 1997–98 | Seventh Round | (Guadeloupe) Phare du Canal | 1–3 | FC Saint-Lô |
| 1997–98 | Seventh Round | (Réunion) AS Saint-Louisienne | 2–1 | La Roche VF |
| 1997–98 | Seventh Round | (French Polynesia) AS Dragon | 3–0 | ES Segré HA |
| 1997–98 | Seventh Round | AS Angoulême C92 | 4–0 | (French Guiana) AJ Saint-Georges |
| 1997–98 | Seventh Round | Angers SCO | 1–1 (a.e.t) (4–5 p) | (Martinique) Golden Star |
| 1997–98 | Seventh Round | FC Istres VN | 4–0 | (New Caledonia) JS Traput |
| 1997–98 | Eighth Round | FC Bourg-Péronnas | 3–0 | (Réunion) AS Saint-Louisienne |
| 1998–99 | Seventh Round | (French Guiana) US de Matoury | 1–1 (a.e.t) (4–5 p) | US Saint-Malo |
| 1998–99 | Seventh Round | (Martinique) Éclair de Rivière-Salée | 0–0 (a.e.t) (1–3 p) | Pacy VEF |
| 1998–99 | Seventh Round | (New Caledonia) JS Traput | 0–4 | JA Armentières |
| 1998–99 | Seventh Round | Dijon FCO | 12–1 | (Guadeloupe) US Baie-Mahault |
| 1998–99 | Seventh Round | GSI Pontivy | 2–1 | (Réunion) La Tamponnaise |
| 1998–99 | Seventh Round | Gazélec Ajaccio | 3–0 | (French Polynesia) A.S. Pirae |
| 1999–2000 | Seventh Round | (Guadeloupe) ASC Red Star de Pointe-à-Pitre | 0–5 | FC Mulhouse |
| 1999–2000 | Seventh Round | (French Polynesia) A.S. Pirae | 0–2 | Vannes OC |
| 1999–2000 | Seventh Round | (Réunion) SS Jeanne d'Arc | 0–1 | Angers SCO |
| 1999–2000 | Seventh Round | Grenoble F38 | 7–2 | (French Guiana) AJ Saint-Georges |
| 1999–2000 | Seventh Round | FC Bourg-Péronnas | 1–0 | (Martinique) Club Franciscain |
| 1999–2000 | Seventh Round | La Roche VF | 4–0 | (New Caledonia) JS Traput |
| 2000–01 | Seventh Round | (French Guiana) AS Club Colonial | 1–3 | FC Mulhouse |
| 2000–01 | Seventh Round | (Martinique) Club Franciscain | 0–3 | Vannes OC |
| 2000–01 | Seventh Round | (New Caledonia) AS Magenta | 1–2 | Levallois SCF |
| 2000–01 | Seventh Round | AS Muret | 0–1 | (Guadeloupe) L'Etoile de Morne-à-l'Eau |
| 2000–01 | Seventh Round | FC Dieppe | 5–2 | (Réunion) AS Marsouins |
| 2000–01 | Seventh Round | FC Sète 34 | 5–3 | (French Polynesia) A.S. Pirae |
| 2000–01 | Eighth Round | (Guadeloupe) L'Etoile de Morne-à-l'Eau | 0–1 | Stade de Reims |
| 2001–02 | Seventh Round | (Guadeloupe) AS Dragons FC | 0–2 | Vannes OC |
| 2001–02 | Seventh Round | (Réunion) AS Excelsior | 3–3 (a.e.t.) (3–4 p) | Stade Brestois 29 |
| 2001–02 | Seventh Round | (French Polynesia) A.S. Dragon | 2–1 | FC Rouen |
| 2001–02 | Seventh Round | RCO Agde | 5–1 | (French Guiana) US de Matoury |
| 2001–02 | Seventh Round | AS Saint-Priest | 2–1 (a.e.t.) | (Martinique) CS Case-Pilote |
| 2001–02 | Seventh Round | USFC Vesoul | 1–0 | (Mayotte) FC Mtsapéré |
| 2001–02 | Seventh Round | Tours FC | 5–2 | (New Caledonia) AS Magenta |
| 2001–02 | Eighth Round | Trélissac FC | 4–0 | (French Polynesia) A.S. Dragon |
| 2002–03 | Seventh Round | (French Guiana) ASC Le Geldar de Kourou | 1–3 (a.e.t.) | La Flèche RC |
| 2002–03 | Seventh Round | (Martinique) Club Franciscain | 2–1 | Olympique Noisy-le-Sec |
| 2002–03 | Seventh Round | (Mayotte) Pamandzi SC | 0–2 | CS Avion |
| 2002–03 | Seventh Round | FC Martigues | 4–0 | (Guadeloupe) AS Dragon Gosier |
| 2002–03 | Seventh Round | Tours FC | 3–3 (a.e.t.) (4–3 p) | (Réunion) AS Saint-Louisienne |
| 2002–03 | Seventh Round | US Forbach | 3–2 (a.e.t.) | (New Caledonia) AS Magenta |
| 2002–03 | Seventh Round | RCO Agde | 3–1 (a.e.t.) | (French Polynesia) A.S. Pirae |
| 2002–03 | Eighth Round | Stade de Reims | 3–1 | (Martinique) Club Franciscain |
| 2003–04 | Seventh Round | (French Polynesia) A.S. Manu-Ura | 0–3 | FC Mulhouse |
| 2003–04 | Seventh Round | (Guadeloupe) L'Etoile de Morne-à-l'Eau | 2–2 (a.e.t.) (4–2 p) | SO Romorantin |
| 2003–04 | Seventh Round | (New Caledonia) AS Magenta | 2–3 | Vendée Fontenay Foot |
| 2003–04 | Seventh Round | Thonon Évian | 5–0 | (Mayotte) Pamandzi SC |
| 2003–04 | Seventh Round | Dijon FCO | 2–0 | (Martinique) Club Franciscain |
| 2003–04 | Seventh Round | AS Cannes | 5–0 | (French Guiana) US de Matoury |
| 2003–04 | Seventh Round | (Réunion) La Tamponnaise | 0–4 | Gazélec Ajaccio |
| 2003–04 | Eighth Round | US Boulogne | 4–1 | (Guadeloupe) L'Etoile de Morne-à-l'Eau |
| 2004–05 | Seventh Round | (Mayotte) FC Mtsapéré | 1–2 | SAS Épinal |
| 2004–05 | Seventh Round | (New Caledonia) AS Magenta | 3–4 | GSI Pontivy |
| 2004–05 | Seventh Round | (French Guiana) US Macouria | 0–5 | US Orléans |
| 2004–05 | Seventh Round | (Martinique) Aiglon du Lamentin | 0–4 | USL Dunkerque |
| 2004–05 | Seventh Round | ES Viry-Châtillon | 3–2 | (Guadeloupe) Evolucas |
| 2004–05 | Seventh Round | Pau FC | 4–0 | (French Polynesia) A.S. Dragon |
| 2004–05 | Seventh Round | RC Besançon | 6–2 | (Réunion) Saint-Denis FC |
| 2005–06 | Seventh Round | (Guadeloupe) CS Moulien | 0–3 | US Lesquin |
| 2005–06 | Seventh Round | (Réunion) AS Chaudron | 2–1 (a.e.t.) | ASPV Strasbourg |
| 2005–06 | Seventh Round | (French Polynesia) A.S. Manu-Ura | 1–2 | Sainte-Geneviève Sports |
| 2005–06 | Seventh Round | Olympique Noisy-le-Sec | 3–2 | (French Guiana) US de Matoury |
| 2005–06 | Seventh Round | Angers SCO | 0–2 | (Martinique) Club Franciscain |
| 2005–06 | Seventh Round | Hyères FC | 4–0 | (Mayotte) AJ Kani-Kéli |
| 2005–06 | Seventh Round | GSI Pontivy | 4–0 | (New Caledonia) AS Magenta |
| 2005–06 | Eighth Round | (Martinique) Club Franciscain | 2–5 | Louhans-Cuiseaux FC |
| 2005–06 | Eighth Round | Wasquehal Football | 2–1 (a.e.t.) | (Réunion) AS Chaudron |
| 2006–07 | Seventh Round | (New Caledonia) JS Baco | 1–4 | USJA Carquefou |
| 2006–07 | Seventh Round | (Martinique) Aiglon du Lamentin | 0–2 | JA Armentières |
| 2006–07 | Seventh Round | (French Polynesia) CSC de Cayenne | 1–4 | Villemomble Sports |
| 2006–07 | Seventh Round | (Mayotte) FCO Tsingoni | 0–5 | US Concarneau |
| 2006–07 | Seventh Round | Clermont Foot | 2–1 (a.e.t.) | (Guadeloupe) CS Moulien |
| 2006–07 | Seventh Round | ESA Brive | 3–1 | (French Polynesia) A.S. Tefana |
| 2006–07 | Seventh Round | SC Schiltigheim | 0–7 | (Réunion) La Tamponnaise |
| 2006–07 | Eighth Round | (Réunion) La Tamponnaise | 2–2 (a.e.t.) (3–4 p) | FUSC Bois-Guillaume |
| 2007–08 | Seventh Round | (French Polynesia) A.S. Tefana | 1–3 (a.e.t.) | US Lesquin |
| 2007–08 | Seventh Round | (Guadeloupe) CS Moulien | 0–0 (a.e.t.) (4–2 p) | Pacy VEF |
| 2007–08 | Seventh Round | Tours FC | 7–1 | (Mayotte) Foudre 2000 |
| 2007–08 | Seventh Round | CA Bastia | 1–1 (a.e.t.) (2–4 p) | (French Guiana) CSC de Cayenne |
| 2007–08 | Seventh Round | FC Dieppe | 3–0 | (New Caledonia) AS Lössi |
| 2007–08 | Seventh Round | TVEC Les Sables-d'Olonne | 0–1 | (Martinique) AS Samaritaine |
| 2007–08 | Eighth Round | (Martinique) AS Samaritaine | 1–2 (a.e.t.) | AC Arles-Avignon |
| 2007–08 | Eighth Round | (Guadeloupe) CS Moulien | 0–6 | Angers SCO |
| 2007–08 | Eighth Round | (French Guiana) CSC de Cayenne | 1–3 | SAS Épinal |
| 2008–09 | Seventh Round | (Mayotte) Foudre 2000 | 1–3 | AS Cannes |
| 2008–09 | Seventh Round | (Martinique) RC Rivière-Pilote | 0–4 | Vendée Fontenay Foot |
| 2008–09 | Seventh Round | (French Guiana) CSC de Cayenne | 0–1 | FC Martigues |
| 2008–09 | Seventh Round | (New Caledonia) AS Mont-Dore | 2–4 | USL Dunkerque |
| 2008–09 | Seventh Round | SR Colmar | 1–1 (a.e.t.) (2–4 p) | (French Polynesia) A.S. Tefana |
| 2008–09 | Seventh Round | FC Saint-Louis Neuweg | 0–1 | (Réunion) SS Jeanne d'Arc |
| 2008–09 | Seventh Round | SC Feignies | 3–2 | (Guadeloupe) Evolucas |
| 2008–09 | Eighth Round | (French Polynesia) A.S. Tefana | 0–2 (a.e.t.) | Arras FA |
| 2008–09 | Eighth Round | (Réunion) SS Jeanne d'Arc | 3–2 | SC Feignies |
| 2008–09 | Round of 64 | (Réunion) SS Jeanne d'Arc | 1–7 | Tours FC |
| 2009–10 | Seventh Round | (Guadeloupe) Amical Club Marie Galante | 2–3 | Vendée Poiré-sur-Vie Football |
| 2009–10 | Seventh Round | (Réunion) AS Excelsior | 1–0 | Quimper Kerfeunteun F.C. |
| 2009–10 | Seventh Round | (French Polynesia) A.S. Manu-Ura | 0–3 | US Raon-l'Étape |
| 2009–10 | Seventh Round | Luçon FC | 2–1 | (Martinique) Club Franciscain |
| 2009–10 | Seventh Round | US Quevilly-Rouen | 6–0 | (Mayotte) Tigres de Kawéni |
| 2009–10 | Seventh Round | GSI Pontivy | 5–0 | (French Guiana) CSC de Cayenne |
| 2009–10 | Seventh Round | US Avranches | 5–3 | (New Caledonia) AS Mont-Dore |
| 2009–10 | Eighth Round | Angers SCO | 5–0 | (Réunion) AS Excelsior |
| 2010–11 | Seventh Round | (Martinique) CS Case-Pilote | 0–2 | AS Poissy |
| 2010–11 | Seventh Round | (French Guiana) ASC Le Geldar de Kourou | 0–2 | FC Martigues |
| 2010–11 | Seventh Round | (New Caledonia) AS Magenta | 1–1 (a.e.t.) (5–4 p) | USL Dunkerque |
| 2010–11 | Seventh Round | CSO Amnéville | 2–0 | (Guadeloupe) CS Moulien |
| 2010–11 | Seventh Round | US Avranches | 5–1 | (Mayotte) FC de Majicavo Koropa |
| 2010–11 | Seventh Round | Stade Poitevin FC | 4–0 | (French Polynesia) A.S. Dragon |
| 2010–11 | Seventh Round | Lannion FC | 1–0 | (Réunion) Saint-Pauloise FC |
| 2010–11 | Eighth Round | Paris FC | 4–0 | (New Caledonia) AS Magenta |
| 2011–12 | Seventh Round | (French Polynesia) A.S. Tefana | 1–2 | Red Star |
| 2011–12 | Seventh Round | (Guadeloupe) Evolucas | 0–5 | US Avranches |
| 2011–12 | Seventh Round | (Réunion) La Tamponnaise | 3–3 (a.e.t.) (2–4 p) | CSO Amnéville |
| 2011–12 | Seventh Round | US Raon-l'Étape | 6–0 | (Mayotte) ASCA de M'tsamboro |
| 2011–12 | Seventh Round | La Vitréenne FC | 4–0 | (French Guiana) US de Matoury |
| 2011–12 | Seventh Round | AFC Compiègne | 9–0 | (New Caledonia) Gaïtcha FCN |
| 2011–12 | Seventh Round | US Ivry | 4–2 | (Martinique) CS Bélimois |
| 2012–13 | Seventh Round | (New Caledonia) AS Lössi | 0–3 | FC Mulhouse |
| 2012–13 | Seventh Round | (French Guiana) ASC Le Geldar de Kourou | 1–4 | FC Dieppe |
| 2012–13 | Seventh Round | (Martinique) Club Colonial | 0–1 | USSA Vertou |
| 2012–13 | Seventh Round | SR Colmar | 5–0 | (Guadeloupe) L'Etoile de Morne-à-l'Eau |
| 2012–13 | Seventh Round | USL Dunkerque | 3–2 (a.e.t.) | (Réunion) Saint-Pauloise FC |
| 2012–13 | Seventh Round | AFC Compiègne | 2–1 | (Mayotte) FC Mtsapéré |
| 2012–13 | Seventh Round | GSI Pontivy | 5–1 | (French Polynesia) A.S. Tefana |
| 2013–14 | Seventh Round | (Guadeloupe) CS Moulien | 0–1 | FC Chambly |
| 2013–14 | Seventh Round | (Réunion) US Sainte-Marienne | 2–0 | Paris FC |
| 2013–14 | Seventh Round | (French Polynesia) A.S. Dragon | 0–1 | ASM Belfort |
| 2013–14 | Seventh Round | US Avranches | 3–1 | (French Guiana) US de Matoury |
| 2013–14 | Seventh Round | US Concarneau | 4–1 | (Martinique) Club Franciscain |
| 2013–14 | Seventh Round | AS Poissy | 2–1 | (New Caledonia) Hienghène Sport |
| 2013–14 | Seventh Round | La Roche VF | 8–3 | (Mayotte) AJ Kani-Kéli |
| 2013–14 | Eighth Round | US Raon-l'Étape | 2–0 | (Réunion) US Sainte-Marienne |
| 2014–15 | Seventh Round | (Martinique) Club Franciscain | 2–0 | Sainte-Geneviève Sports |
| 2014–15 | Seventh Round | (Réunion) AS Excelsior | 0–2 | US Concarneau |
| 2014–15 | Seventh Round | (French Guiana) US Macouria | 0–3 | FC Martigues |
| 2014–15 | Seventh Round | (Guadeloupe) CS Moulien | 1–1 (a.e.t.) (3–4 p) | Sarreguemines FC |
| 2014–15 | Seventh Round | (New Caledonia) AS Magenta | 0–3 | Trélissac FC |
| 2014–15 | Seventh Round | CMS Oissel | 1–1 (a.e.t.) (2–4 p) | (French Guiana) US de Matoury |
| 2014–15 | Seventh Round | US Avranches | 6–1 | (Mayotte) ASJ de Mzouazia |
| 2014–15 | Seventh Round | GSI Pontivy | 2–2 (a.e.t.) (4–5 p) | (Réunion) AS Saint-Louisienne |
| 2014–15 | Seventh Round | Olympique Noisy-le-Sec | 2–1 (a.e.t.) | (French Polynesia) A.S. Tefana |
| 2014–15 | Seventh Round | US Quevilly | 2–0 | (Guadeloupe) ASC Siroco des Abymes |
| 2014–15 | Seventh Round | SO Cholet | 2–0 | (Martinique) Aiglon du Lamentin |
| 2014–15 | Eighth Round | US Lormont | 0–2 | (Martinique) Club Franciscain |
| 2014–15 | Eighth Round | (French Guiana) US de Matoury | 0–1 | US Avranches |
| 2014–15 | Eighth Round | (Réunion) AS Saint-Louisienne | 1–2 (a.e.t.) | US Quevilly |
| 2014–15 | Round of 64 | FC Nantes | 4–0 | (Martinique) Club Franciscain |
| 2015–16 | Seventh Round | (French Polynesia) A.S. Pirae | 5–6 (a.e.t.) | GSI Pontivy |
| 2015–16 | Seventh Round | (Guadeloupe) L'Etoile de Morne-à-l'Eau | 1–2 | UJA Maccabi Paris |
| 2015–16 | Seventh Round | (French Guiana) ASC Agouado | 0–4 | US Lège-Cap-Ferret |
| 2015–16 | Seventh Round | (Martinique) Golden Lion FC | 2–2 (a.e.t.) (12–11 p) | Olympique Noisy-le-Sec |
| 2015–16 | Seventh Round | (Réunion) AS Excelsior | 1–0 (a.e.t.) | AS Poissy |
| 2015–16 | Seventh Round | FC Chambly | 1–0 | (Martinique) Golden Star |
| 2015–16 | Seventh Round | Voltigeurs de Châteaubriant | 3–0 | (Mayotte) ASJ de Mzouazia |
| 2015–16 | Seventh Round | FC Mulhouse | 3–0 | (Guadeloupe) CS Moulien |
| 2015–16 | Seventh Round | FC Saint-Lô Manche | 0–2 | (Réunion) US Sainte-Marienne |
| 2015–16 | Seventh Round | RC Épernay Champagne | 3–2 | (New Caledonia) Hienghène Sport |
| 2015–16 | Seventh Round | FC Mantois 78 | 4–0 | (French Guiana) EF d'Iracoubo |
| 2015–16 | Eighth Round | (Réunion) US Sainte-Marienne | 2–2 (a.e.t.) (3–0 p) | USSA Vertou |
| 2015–16 | Eighth Round | Racing Besançon | 2–1 (a.e.t.) | (French Guiana) Golden Lion FC |
| 2015–16 | Eighth Round | AC Ajaccio | 0–0 (a.e.t.) (3–2 p) | (Réunion) AS Excelsior |
| 2015–16 | Round of 64 | Gazélec Ajaccio | 2–0 | (Réunion) US Sainte-Marienne |
| 2016–17 | Seventh Round | (Guadeloupe) CS Moulien | 0–3 | FC Fleury 91 |
| 2016–17 | Seventh Round | (New Caledonia) AS Magenta | 1–7 | Pau FC |
| 2016–17 | Seventh Round | (Martinique) Club Franciscain | 0–0 (a.e.t.) (3–4 p) | FC Lunéville |
| 2016–17 | Seventh Round | (French Guiana) ASC Le Geldar de Kourou | 1–3 | SC Selongey |
| 2016–17 | Seventh Round | (Réunion) JS Saint-Pierroise | 0–0 (a.e.t.) (3–4 p) | Sainte-Geneviève Sports |
| 2016–17 | Seventh Round | Avoine OCC | 1–1 (a.e.t.) (2–4 p) | (Réunion) AS Excelsior |
| 2016–17 | Seventh Round | Rodez AF | 3–2 (a.e.t.) | (Mayotte) FC Mtsapéré |
| 2016–17 | Seventh Round | ASM Belfort | 4–0 | (Guadeloupe) Phare du Canal |
| 2016–17 | Seventh Round | US Avranches | 9–0 | (French Polynesia) AS Dragon |
| 2016–17 | Seventh Round | FC Mulhouse | 3–0 | (French Guiana) US de Matoury |
| 2016–17 | Seventh Round | Tarbes Pyrénées Football | 1–0 | (Martinique) Golden Lion FC |
| 2016–17 | Eighth Round | (Réunion) AS Excelsior | 1–1 (a.e.t.) (3–0 p) | FC Mulhouse |
| 2016–17 | Round of 64 | Lille OSC | 4–1 | (Réunion) AS Excelsior |
| 2017–18 | Seventh Round | (Guadeloupe) L'Etoile de Morne-à-l'Eau | 1–4 | FC Saint-Lô Manche |
| 2017–18 | Seventh Round | (French Guiana) ASE de Matoury | 0–0 (a.e.t.) (3–2 p) | US Avranches |
| 2017–18 | Seventh Round | (Martinique) Club Colonial | 2–3 | ASM Belfort |
| 2017–18 | Seventh Round | (Réunion) AJ Petite-Île | 0–1 | AS Beauvais Oise |
| 2017–18 | Seventh Round | (French Polynesia) A.S. Tefana | 0–3 | Rodez AF |
| 2017–18 | Seventh Round | US Concarneau | 7–0 | (Martinique) Golden Lion FC |
| 2017–18 | Seventh Round | L'Entente SSG | 7–1 | (New Caledonia) AS Lössi |
| 2017–18 | Seventh Round | Stade Briochin | 9–1 | (French Guiana) ASC Le Geldar de Kourou |
| 2017–18 | Seventh Round | SAS Épinal | 6–2 | (Guadeloupe) CS Moulien |
| 2017–18 | Seventh Round | Feignies Aulnoye FC | 1–3 | (Réunion) AS Excelsior |
| 2017–18 | Seventh Round | SO Romorantin | 10–1 | (Mayotte) Diables Noir |
| 2017–18 | Eighth Round | (Réunion) AS Excelsior | 2–3 | Le Mans FC |
| 2017–18 | Eighth Round | Houilles AC | 2–1 | (French Guiana) ASE de Matoury |
| 2018–19 | Third Round | ALC Longvic | 2–1 | (Saint Pierre and Miquelon) A.S. Saint Pierraise |
| 2018–19 | Seventh Round | (Martinique) Golden Lion FC | 2–4 (a.e.t.) | SAS Épinal |
| 2018–19 | Seventh Round | (Guadeloupe) USR Sainte-Rose | 1–3 | FC Côte Bleue |
| 2018–19 | Seventh Round | (French Guiana) ASE de Matoury | 2–3 | US Concarneau |
| 2018–19 | Seventh Round | (New Caledonia) AS Magenta | 0–1 | AF Bobigny |
| 2018–19 | Seventh Round | (Réunion) SS Jeanne d'Arc | 0–1 (a.e.t.) | Besançon Football |
| 2018–19 | Seventh Round | ES Thaon | 3–0 | (Guadeloupe) JS Vieux-Habitants |
| 2018–19 | Seventh Round | Stade Poitevin FC | 0–0 (a.e.t.) (1–4 p) | (Martinique) Aiglon du Lamentin |
| 2018–19 | Seventh Round | Saint-Pryvé Saint-Hilaire FC | 1–0 | (French Guiana) US de Matoury |
| 2018–19 | Seventh Round | L'Entente SSG | 4–0 | (Mayotte) FC Mtsapéré |
| 2018–19 | Seventh Round | FC Versailles 78 | 2–0 | (French Polynesia) A.S. Dragon |
| 2018–19 | Seventh Round | Sainte-Geneviève Sports | 4–0 | (Réunion) AS Sainte-Suzanne |
| 2018–19 | Eighth Round | (Martinique) Aiglon du Lamentin | 3–2 | Sainte-Geneviève Sports |
| 2018–19 | Round of 64 | US Orleans | 3–2 (a.e.t.) | (Martinique) Aiglon du Lamentin |
| 2019–20 | Third Round | FC Lyon | 5–1 | (Saint Pierre and Miquelon) A.S. Îlienne Amateur |
| 2019–20 | Seventh Round | (French Polynesia) A.S. Vénus | 1–4 | Racing Besançon |
| 2019–20 | Seventh Round | (Réunion) US Sainte-Marienne | 2–3 | FC Versailles 78 |
| 2019–20 | Seventh Round | (Martinique) Golden Star | 0–1 | (Martinique) Club Franciscain |
| 2019–20 | Seventh Round | (Guadeloupe) CS Moulien | 0–2 | (Guadeloupe) AN Jeunesse Évolution |
| 2019–20 | Seventh Round | (French Guiana) AJ Saint-Georges | 2–1 | (French Guiana) CSC de Cayenne |
| 2019–20 | Seventh Round | Jura Sud Foot | 0–1 | (Réunion) JS Saint-Pierroise |
| 2019–20 | Seventh Round | ASPV Strasbourg | 3–1 | (New Caledonia) Hienghène Sport |
| 2019–20 | Seventh Round | Évreux FC 27 | 3–0 | (Mayotte) FC Mtsapéré |
| 2019–20 | Eighth Round | (Guadeloupe) AN Jeunesse Évolution | 0–2 | ASM Belfort |
| 2019–20 | Eighth Round | (Réunion) JS Saint-Pierroise | 1–1 (a.e.t.) (5–3 p) | ES Thaon |
| 2019–20 | Eighth Round | Tours FC | 2–1 (a.e.t.) | (Martinique) Club Franciscain |
| 2019–20 | Eighth Round | Saint-Pryvé Saint-Hilaire FC | 6–0 | (French Guiana) AJ Saint-Georges |
| 2019–20 | Round of 64 | Chamois Niortais | 1–2 | (Réunion) JS Saint-Pierroise |
| 2019–20 | Round of 32 | SAS Épinal | 1–0 (a.e.t.) | (Réunion) JS Saint-Pierroise |
| 2020–21 | Seventh Round | (Mayotte) Pamandzi SC | 0–2 | (Mayotte) FC Mtsapéré |
| 2020–21 | Seventh Round | (Guadeloupe) Phare du Canal | 1–0 | (Guadeloupe) Unité Sainte Rosienne |
| 2020–21 | Seventh Round | (Réunion) JS Saint-Pierroise | 2–2 (a.e.t.) (5–3 p) | (Réunion) US Sainte-Marienne |
| 2020–21 | Seventh Round | (French Guiana) ASU Grand Santi | 0–2 | (French Guiana) US Sinnamary |
| 2020–21 | Seventh Round | (Martinique) Club Franciscain | 2–0 | (Martinique) AS Samaritaine |
| 2020–21 | Eighth Round | (Réunion) JS Saint-Pierroise | 1–1 (4–5 p) | (Mayotte) FC Mtsapéré |
| 2020–21 | Eighth Round | (French Guiana) US Sinnamary | 2–0 | (Guadeloupe) Phare du Canal |
| 2020–21 | Round of 64 | (French Guiana) US Sinnamary | 1–1 (1–3 p) | (Martinique) Club Franciscain |
| 2020–21 | Round of 64 | SO Romorantin | 2–0 | (Mayotte) FC Mtsapéré |
| 2020–21 | Round of 32 | Angers | 5–0 | (Martinique) Club Franciscain |
| 2021–22 | Third Round | USSA Vertou | 8–0 | (Saint Pierre and Miquelon) A.S. Saint Pierraise |
| 2021–22 | Seventh Round | Trélissac-Antonne Périgord FC | 2–0 | (French Polynesia) A.S. Vénus |
| 2021–22 | Seventh Round | CS Plédran | 1–5 | (Mayotte) Jumeaux de M'Zoisia |
| 2021–22 | Seventh Round | ASC Makes (Réunion) | 1–9 | (Réunion) Saint-Denis FC |
| 2021–22 | Seventh Round | ASC Ouest (French Guiana) | 0–2 | (French Guiana) CSC de Cayenne |
| 2021–22 | Seventh Round | Club Colonial (Martinique) | 0–1 | (Martinique) Club Franciscain |
| 2021–22 | Seventh Round | Solidarité-Scolaire (Guadeloupe) | 2–1 | (Guadeloupe) AS Gosier |
| 2021–22 | Eighth Round | Solidarité-Scolaire (Guadeloupe) | 0–2 | US Sarre-Union |
| 2021–22 | Eighth Round | (Martinique) Club Franciscain | 1–2 | SO Cholet |
| 2021–22 | Eighth Round | Paris FC | 14–0 | (French Guiana) CSC Cayenne |
| 2021–22 | Eighth Round | Canet Roussillon FC | 1–1 (6–7 p) | (Réunion) Saint-Denis FC |
| 2021–22 | Eighth Round | Plancoët-Arguenon FC | 1–3 | (Mayotte) AS Jumeaux de M'zouazia |
| 2021–22 | Round of 64 | Bordeaux | 10–0 | (Mayotte) AS Jumeaux de M'zouazia |
| 2021–22 | Round of 64 | Jura Sud Foot | 5–2 | (Réunion) Saint-Denis FC |
| 2022–23 | Seventh round | | | |
| 2022–23 | Seventh round | ASC Le Geldar (French Guiana) | 1–1 (4–5 pen) | (French Guiana) ASU Grand Santi |
| 2022–23 | Seventh round | JS Saint-Pierroise (Réunion) | 0–0 (4–5 pen) | (Réunion) La Tamponnaise |
| 2022–23 | Seventh round | Golden Lion FC (Martinique) | 1–2 | (Martinique) Aiglon du Lamentin FC |
| 2022–23 | Seventh round | L'Étoile de Morne-à-l'Eau (Guadeloupe) | 1–1 (5–4 pen) | (Guadeloupe) SC Baie-Mahault |
| 2022–23 | Seventh round | Olympique Saint-Quentin | 2–1 | Hienghène Sport (New Caledonia) |
| 2022–23 | Seventh round | FC Annecy | 8–1 | (Mayotte) Diables Noirs |
| 2022–23 | Seventh round | (French Polynesia) A.S. Vénus | 0–3 | ASM Belfort |
| 2022–23 | Eighth round | (Réunion) La Tamponnaise | 1–0 | FCM Aubervilliers |
| 2022–23 | Eighth round | Amiens | 10–0 | (Martinique) Aiglon du Lamentin FC |
| 2022–23 | Eighth round | US Granville | 6–0 | (Guadeloupe) L'Étoile de Morne-à-l'Eau |
| 2022–23 | Eighth round | (French Guiana) ASU Grand Santi | 0–3 | Évreux FC 27 |
| 2022–23 | Round of 64 | RC Grasse | 1–0 | (Réunion) La Tamponnaise |
| 2023–24 | Seventh round | FC Saint-Meziery | 1–0 | (French Polynesia) A.S. Pirae |
| 2023–24 | Seventh round | Olympique Alès | 6–1 | (Mayotte) AS Rosador |
| 2023–24 | Seventh round | Hienghène Sport (New Caledonia) | 0–4 | US Thionville Lusitanos |
| 2023–24 | Seventh round | ASC Le Geldar (French Guiana) | 3–0 | (French Guiana) ASC Agouado |
| 2023–24 | Seventh round | La Tamponnaise (Réunion) | 2–3 | (Réunion) Saint-Denis FC |
| 2023–24 | Seventh round | AS Samaritaine (Martinique) | 0–1 | (Martinique) Golden Lion FC |
| 2023–24 | Seventh round | CS Moulien (Guadeloupe) | 3–1 | (Guadeloupe) SC Baie-Mahault |
| 2023–24 | Eighth round | Avoine OCC | 4–1 | (French Guiana) ASC Le Geldar |
| 2023–24 | Eighth round | CS Moulien (Guadeloupe) | 1–1 (3–2 pen) | FC Fleury 91 |
| 2023–24 | Eighth round | Paris FC | 3–1 | (Réunion) Saint-Denis FC |
| 2023–24 | Eighth round | Golden Lion FC (Martinique) | 3–2 | FC Métropole Troyenne |
| 2023–24 | Round of 64 | Lille OSC | 12–0 | (Martinique) Golden Lion FC |
| 2023–24 | Round of 64 | SO Romorantin | 4–0 | (Guadeloupe) CS Moulien |
