= 2016 New Caledonia Super Ligue =

New Caledonia Super Ligue
- Season: 2016
- Champions: Magenta
- Relegated: Gaïtcha; USC; Kunié
- Matches: 144
- Goals: 667 (4.63 per match)
- Biggest home win: Magenta 12−2 USC; 18 March 2016
- Biggest away win: Kunié 1−11 Wetr; 17 June 2016

The New Caledonia Super Ligue 2016 was the 43rd season of top-tier Caledonian football. It started on 3 March and ended on 3 December 2016. Thirteen teams took part in the championship. The two teams with the highest number of points were chosen to represent New Caledonia in the group stage of the 2018 OFC Champions League.

== Standings ==
Pos	Team	Pld	W	D	L	GF	GA	GD	Pts	Qualification or relegation
1	Magenta (C)	24	17	5	2	83	22	+61	80	2018 OFC Champions League group stage
2	Lössi	24	17	5	2	76	24	+52	80	2018 OFC Champions League group stage
3	Hienghène Sport	24	17	3	4	90	28	+62	78	
4	Ne Drehu	24	11	7	6	48	40	+8	64	
5	Horizon Patho	24	14	4	6	59	37	+22	60 (Note: Horizon Patho deducted ten points. Furthermore, having finished as the worst placed of the two clubs "des Îles" (i.e. not from Grande Terre), the team had to play off against the winner of the Championnat des Îles 2016.)	Promotion/relegation playoff
6	Mont-Dore	24	11	2	11	53	47	+6	59	
7	Wetr	24	9	5	10	53	46	+7	56	
8	Tiga Sport	24	7	7	10	32	50	−18	51 (Note: Tiga Sport deducted one point.)	
9	FC Bélep	24	6	5	13	45	70	−25	44 (Note: Bélep deducted three points.)	
10	Poindimié	24	6	2	16	42	69	−27	42 (Note: Poindimié deducted two points.)	
11	Gaïtcha FCN (R)	24	9	2	13	37	64	−27	41 (Note: Gaïtcha deducted twelve points.)	Relegation to the 2017 Promotion d'Honneur
12	USC (R)	24	3	4	17	27	92	−65	37	Relegation to the 2017 Promotion d'Honneur
13	Kunié (R)	24	2	3	19	22	78	−56	32 (Note: Kunié deducted one point.)	Relegation to the 2017 Promotion d'Honneur

Rules for classification: 1) Points, 2) Head to head, 3) Goal difference. 4 points for a win, 2 points for a draw, and 1 for a defeat.
(C) Champions; (R) Relegated

=== Relegation play-off ===
Out of the thirteen teams on the top tier of 2016, eleven are based on Grande Terre, the main island of New Caledonia, while two are from other islands (A.S. Horizon Patho from Maré Island and SC Ne Drehu from Lifou Island). At the end of the season, the worst placed team among the ones which are not based on the main island is either relegated directly (if finishing 8th or lower) or must face a play off against the winner of the Championnat des Îles 2016 (if finishing 7th or higher). Because Ne Drehu finished 4th and Horizon Patho finished 5th (even though they would have finished 4th, hadn't they been deducted 10 points), the latter played against E.S. Wacaelé.

==== First leg ====
9 March 2017

Horizon Patho	0–1	Wacaelé

Stade Numa-Daly Magenta, Nouméa

==== Second leg ====
11 March 2017

Wacaelé	0–2	Horizon Patho

Stade Numa-Daly Magenta, Nouméa

Horizon Patho won 2–1 on aggregate and both clubs therefore remain in their respective tiers for the 2017 season.
