= Lues Waya =

New Caledonian footballer (born 2001)

Personal information
- Full name: Lues William Joseph Waya
- Date of birth: 1 August 2001 (age 25)
- Place of birth: Tiga Island, New Caledonia
- Height: 1.84 m (6 ft 0 in)
- Position: Striker

Team information
- Current team: USSA Vertou

Youth career
- 2013–2015: Tiga Sport
- 2015–2017: AS Wetr
- 2017–2019: Tiga Sport

Senior career*
Years	Team	Apps	(Gls)
2019–2023	Tiga Sport		(39)
2023	Laval II	0	(0)
2023–	USSA Vertou	19	(1)

International career^{‡}
2019	New Caledonia U18	3	(1)
2022–	New Caledonia	7	(8)
Medal record
Men's football
Representing New Caledonia
Pacific Games
Gold medal – first place	2023 Solomon Islands
- * Club domestic league appearances and goals as of 18:32, 21 March 2025 (UTC) ‡ National team caps and goals as of 18:32, 24 March 2025 (UTC)

Lues Waya (born 1 August 2001) is a New Caledonian footballer currently playing for USSA Vertou and the New Caledonia national team.

== Club career ==
Waya began playing football in the academy of AS Tiga Sport at age 12. A few years later he moved to AS Wetr for two seasons before returning to Tiga Sport. He began as a goalkeeper before transitioning to midfielder and eventually striker.

He was promoted to Tiga's first team in 2019 and became a key player during the 2020 season. Between March and December that year, he score five total goals, three in the regular season and an additional two goals in the play-offs. He also tallied at least one assist and drew two penalty kicks over that time. In the league final, Waya scored as Tiga Sport defeated AS Magenta 2–0 to win the club's first-ever Super League title.

Waya began the 2022 season with a hattrick against AS Qanono to remain at the top of the table. AS Tiga Sport won the league title again that season, with Waya scoring on the final matchday to secure the result. He was the league's top scorer that season with twenty four goals. He was later named the league's best player for the season.

In December 2022, following the 2022 domestic season, it was announced that Waya was traveling to Metropolitan France to join Voltigeurs de Châteaubriant of the Championnat National 2, the fourth tier league in the country, at the midpoint of the league's 2022–2023 season. He also received interest from Stade Bordelais and a club from Bastia. However, several days later it was announced that the player had accepted an invitation to trial with FC Nantes of Ligue 1 from 2–15 January 2023. Waya made his debut for the club with the reserve team on 6 January 2023 in a friendly defeat to US Concarneau. Shortly thereafter it was announced that the trial had been extended by a few weeks.

Following the three-week trial in Nantes, Waya went on to join Stade Lavallois of Ligue 2 for an additional trial in early February 2023. At the end of the trial he was signed to the club’s reserve squad in the Championnat National 3 until the end of the season. By August 2023, the attacker had joined USSA Vertou of the National 3. The club opened the 2023–24 season with a 4–1 victory over Les Sables FCOC. Waya recorded an assist on the eventual game-winning goal.

== International career ==
At the youth level, Waya represented New Caledonia at the 2019 OFC Youth Development Tournament. In New Caledonia's final match of the group stage, from the penalty spot Waya scored his team's only goal in a 1–4 defeat to guest team India.

Waya was called up to the senior national team for the first time in March 2022 for 2022 FIFA World Cup qualification. He went on to make his debut on 24 March as a second-half substitute in a defeat to New Zealand.

=== International goals ===
Scores and results list the New Caledonia's goal tally first.

No.	Date	Venue	Opponent	Score	Result	Competition
1.	18 November 2023	SIFF Academy Field, Honiara, Solomon Islands	Tonga	1–0	7–0	2023 Pacific Games
2.	18 November 2023	SIFF Academy Field, Honiara, Solomon Islands	Tonga	6–0	7–0	2023 Pacific Games
3.	18 November 2023	SIFF Academy Field, Honiara, Solomon Islands	Tonga	7–0	7–0	2023 Pacific Games
4.	24 November 2023	SIFF Academy Field, Honiara, Solomon Islands	Cook Islands	4–0	8–0	2023 Pacific Games
5.	24 November 2023	SIFF Academy Field, Honiara, Solomon Islands	Cook Islands	5–0	8–0	2023 Pacific Games
6.	24 November 2023	SIFF Academy Field, Honiara, Solomon Islands	Cook Islands	6–0	8–0	2023 Pacific Games
7.	2 December 2023	National Stadium, Honiara, Solomon Islands	Solomon Islands	1–0	2–2	2023 Pacific Games
8.	21 March 2025	Wellington Regional Stadium, Wellington, New Zealand	Tahiti	3–0	3–0	2026 FIFA World Cup qualification
Last updated 21 March 2025

=== International career statistics ===
As of match played 24 March 2025

New Caledonia
Year	Apps	Goals
2022	1	0
2023	4	7
2024	0	0
2025	2	1
Total	7	8

== Honours ==
New Caledonia

- Pacific Games: Gold Medalist, 2023
