= Gilles Tavergeux =

New Caledonian footballer (born 1958 or 1959)

Personal information
- Full name: Gilles Tavergeux
- Date of birth: 1958 or 1959 (age 66–67)
- Place of birth: Nouméa, New Caledonia
- Position: Goalkeeper

Youth career
- ES Nouméa

Senior career*
Years	Team	Apps	(Gls)
1978	AS Lössi		
- AS Pirae
1982–1999	CA Saint-Louis		

International career
1981–????	New Caledonia	1+	(0+)
- * Club domestic league appearances and goals

Gilles Tavergeux (born 1958 or 1959) is a New Caledonian football administrator and former footballer who played as a goalkeeper. He served as the president of the New Caledonian Football Federation between 2020 and 2025.

In 2022, the IFFHS included Tavergeux in their men's all-time New Caledonia dream team.

== Football career ==
Tavergeux started playing football as a midfielder at ES Nouméa. He became a goalkeeper at AS Lössi, after the team's goalkeeper got injured. He eventually started military service in mainland France, before being moved to Tahiti, where he played for AS Pirae. In 1982, he joined CA Saint-Louis, where he won the 1997 Coupe de Calédonie against FC Gaitcha, scoring the winning penalty in the shootout. He played at Saint-Louis until 1999, when he left to help create AS Mont-Dore.

Tavergeux also played for the New Caledonia national team in 1981, during a 1–0 loss to Tahiti at the 1981 South Pacific Mini Games, and became the national team's captain in 1982. While he was stationed in Tahiti, the Tahitian Football Federation wanted him to play for their national team, but he declined.

== Administrative career ==
Tavergeux served as the vice-president of the New Caledonian Football Federation between 2007 and 2011, under president Claude Fournier. He was elected as the president of the federation on 2 November 2020, having previously ran in 2011 and 2016. At the time of the election, he was also the president of AS Mont-Dore. Prior to being elected, he had also served on the FIFA Referees Committee.

On 18 July 2025, it was announced that Tavergeux had been suspended as president of the federation until November, following a vote of no confidence, with the decision having been made privately on 21 June. On 22 December 2025, he failed to get re-elected, losing to predecessor Steeve Laigle.

== Personal life ==
Tavergeux grew up with six siblings. In 1982, he became a police officer in Nouméa, and climbed the ranks to become a police commander. He continued to work as a police officer while playing football.
