= Football in New Caledonia =

- Country: New Caledonia
- Governing body: New Caledonian Football Federation
- National teams: Men's national team Women's national team

Club competitions
- Super League; Second Level

International competitions
- OFC Champions League; FIFA World Cup

The sport of football in the country of New Caledonia is run by the New Caledonian Football Federation. The association administers the national football team as well as the national league.

== League system ==
New Caledonian football league system
| Level | Division | | |
|---|---|---|---|
| 1 | Super League; 10 clubs no promotion ↓ relegate 1.5 | | |
| 2 | Second Level; 3 groups ↑ promote 1.5 no relegation | | |
| 2 | Loyauté Islands Group | Grande Terre Northern Group | Grande Terre Southern Group |

== New Caledonia football venues ==
| Stadium | Capacity | City |
|---|---|---|
| Stade Numa-Daly Magenta | 10,000 | Noumea |
