= Jean-Christ Wajoka =

New Caledonian footballer (born 1992)

Personal information
- Date of birth: 6 September 1992 (age 34)
- Place of birth: Bayonne, France
- Height: 1.75 m (5 ft 9 in)
- Position: Defender

Team information
- Current team: Magenta
- Number: 2

Senior career*
| Years | Team | Apps | (Gls) |
| 2015 | Gaïtcha | | |
| 2016– | Magenta | | |

International career^{‡}
| 2016– | New Caledonia | 9 | (1) |
Medal record
Men's football
Representing New Caledonia
Pacific Games
| Silver medal – second place | 2019 Samoa |
- * Club domestic league appearances and goals as of 23 December 2017 ‡ National team caps and goals as of 2 September 2019

Jean-Christ Wajoka (born September 6, 1992) is a New Caledonian footballer who plays as a defender for New Caledonian side Magenta and the New Caledonia national team.

== Playing career ==
=== Club career ===
As a member of Gaïtcha, Wajoka appeared in three matches at the 2014–15 OFC Champions League, scoring a brace against Tahitian champions Pirae and adding one more against the Samoan champs, Lupe o le Soaga.

For the next season, he made the move to Magenta, and helped them to a league title in 2016.

=== International career ===
Wajoka made his senior international debut for New Caledonia in a friendly against Vanuatu on 26 March 2016.

Wajoka was called up to represent New Caledonia at the 2016 OFC Nations Cup, which also doubled as the second round of the 2018 FIFA World Cup qualifiers for Oceania. He appeared in three matches (against Papua New Guinea, Samoa, and Tahiti, respectively) as his country finished second in their group.

== National team statistics ==
New Caledonia national team
| Year | Apps | Goals |
|---|---|---|
| 2016 | 4 | 0 |
| Total | 4 | 0 |

=== International goals ===
Scores and results list New Caledonia's goal tally first.

| No. | Date | Venue | Opponent | Score | Result | Competition |
|---|---|---|---|---|---|---|
| 1. | 15 July 2019 | National Soccer Stadium, Apia, Samoa | Tahiti | 2–0 | 3–0 | 2019 Pacific Games |

== Honours ==
=== Player ===
- Super Ligue: 2016

New Caledonia

- Pacific Games: Silver Medalist, 2019
