= New Caledonia Second Level =

Football level

New Caledonia Second Level is the Second division of the Fédération Calédonienne de Football in New Caledonia. It is located below the top level New Caledonia Super Ligue.

== New Caledonia Second Level – clubs ==
=== Grande Terre ===
- AS Kunié
- AS Poum
- AS Wet
- ASC Boulouparis
- CA Saint-Louis
- JS Maré
- JS Ny
- Mouli Sport
- Olympique Nouméa
- USC Nouméa

=== Groupe Nord ===
- Hienghène Sport
- JS Amoa
- RC Poindimié
- RS Koumac
- SC Gopahin
- SC Ponérihouen
- SC Xwasu
- Tiéta Sport

=== Groupe Sud ===
Poule A

- AS Auteuil
- ESN
- JS Traput
- JS Vallée-du-Tir
- Thuahaïck
- Tiga Sport

Poule B

- AS Païta
- Central Païta
- CMO La Foa
- CS Bourail
- FC Bélep
- Iaai FC
