= Coupe de Calédonie =

Football knockout tournament

- Founded: 1954
- First season: Indépendante
- Country: New Caledonia
- Confederation: OFC
- Number of clubs: 32 currently
- International cup: Coupe de France
- Current champions: Hienghène Sport (6th title); 2023
- Most championships: AS Magenta (16 titles)
- Broadcaster(s): FCF TV Web
- Website: www.fedcalfoot.com
- Current: 2024 New Caledonia Cup

The Coupe de Calédonie (lit. 'Caledonia Cup'), also known in English as the New Caledonia Cup, is New Caledonia's premier knockout tournament in men's football. It was created in 1954, and gives the winner of the tournament a berth in the Coupe de France.

== Previous winners ==
- 1954: Indépendante 5-3 Uniforme Fayaoué (Ouvéa)
- 1955: no tournament
- 1956: PLGC 2-1 Ouvéa (island selection)
- 1957: Impassible 5-2 PLGC
- 1958: PLGC 6-0 Impassible
- 1959: Wé (Lifou) 4-2 Impassible
- 1960: Uniforme Fayaoué (Ouvéa) 4-2 Indépendante (aet)
- 1961: Ile des Pins 3-2 Impassible
- 1962: Olympique Nouméa 5-0 PLGC
- 1963: Olympique Nouméa 5-1 Ile des Pins
- 1964: JS Vallée du Tir Nouméa 1-0 USC Nouméa
- 1965: JS Vallée du Tir Nouméa 5-2 Ile des Pins
- 1966: JS Vallée du Tir Nouméa 3-0 Thio Sport
- 1967: JS Vallée du Tir Nouméa 1-0 CSM
- 1968: JS Vallée du Tir Nouméa 3-2 ASLN Nouméa
- 1969: ASLN Nouméa 2-1 JS Vallée du Tir Nouméa
- 1970: ASLN Nouméa 3-1 Nathalo (Lifou)
- 1971: ASLN Nouméa 2-1 FC Gaitcha
- 1972: ASLN Nouméa 4-0 CB Ponérihouen
- 1973: UAC Yaté 1-0 JS Vallée du Tir Nouméa
- 1974: UAC Yaté 5-2 ASLN Nouméa (aet)
- 1975: ASLN Nouméa 1-0 JS Vallée du Tir Nouméa
- 1976: Kehdek Koumac 2-1 ASLN Nouméa
- 1977: USL Gélima 2-1 ASLN Nouméa
- 1978: USL Gélima 4-1 JS Maré Nouméa
- 1979: USL Gélima 3-0 JS Maré Nouméa
- 1980: JS Baco 3-2 CA Saint-Louis (aet)
- 1981: CA Saint-Louis 2-1 AS Ponoz
- 1982: USL Gélima 1-1 JS Baco (aet, 3-0 on pens)
- 1983: AS Païta 2-0 CB Ponérihouen
- 1984: JS Baco 2-0 AS Kunié
- 1985: CA Saint-Louis 3-1 AS Kunié
- 1986: CA Saint-Louis 3-0 AS 6e km
- 1987: JS Baco 2-0 AS Kunié
- 1988: Wé-Luécilla (Lifou) 1-0 CA Saint-Louis
- 1989: AS Frégate Mont-Dore 3-2 JS Baco
- 1990: CA Saint-Louis 1-0 Entente Gélima
- 1991: JS Baco 3-1 AS Magenta Le Nickel
- 1992: Wé-Luécilla (Lifou) 3-0 AS Kunié
- 1993: ASLN Thio 4-1 CA Saint-Louis
- 1994: CA Saint-Louis 5-1 AS Qanono
- 1995: JS Baco 3-2 Wé-Luécilla (Lifou)
- 1996: AS Magenta 3-0 Uniforme Fayaoué (Ouvéa)
- 1997: CA Saint-Louis 1-1 FC Gaitcha (aet, 4-3 on pens)
- 1998: JS Traput (Lifou) 1-1 CS Nékoué (aet, 5-4 on pens)
- 1999: JS Traput (Lifou) 1-0 AS Auteuil (aet)
- 2000: AS Magenta 1-1 JS Traput (Lifou) (aet, 4-1 pens)
- 2001: AS Magenta 4-3 AS Mont-Dore
- 2002: AS Magenta 5-2 JS Ouvéa
- 2002–03: AS Magenta 1-0 JS Baco
- 2003–04: AS Magenta 2-1 AS Mont-Dore
- 2004–05: AS Magenta 2-1 JS Baco
- 2005–06: AS Mont-Dore 2-1 JS Baco (aet)
- 2006–07: AS Lössi 1-0 AS Mont-Dore
- 2007–08: AS Mont-Dore 3-0 AS Lössi
- 2008–09: AS Mont-Dore 3-3 AS Magenta (aet, 4-2 pens)
- 2010: AS Magenta 2–1 Gaïtcha FCN
- 2011: Gaïtcha FCN 2-0 AS Magenta
- 2012: AS Lössi 1-1 AS Magenta (aet, 3-2 pens)
- 2013: Hienghène Sport 3-1 AS Qanono
- 2014: AS Magenta 3–1 AS Lössi
- 2015: Hienghène Sport 3–0 AS Mont-Dore
- 2016: AS Magenta 2–2 Hienghène Sport (aet, 4–3 pens)
- 2017: AS Lössi 2-1 Hienghène Sport
- 2018: AS Magenta 1–0 Hienghène Sport
- 2019: Hienghène Sport 5–3 AS Lössi
- 2020: Hienghène Sport 3-1 SC Ne Drehu
- 2022: Hienghène Sport 4-3 AS Tiga Sport
- 2023: Hienghène Sport 2–2 AS Magenta (aet, 5–4 pens)
- 2024: not held
- 2025: AS Magenta 1–0 AS Tiga Sport
