= AS Auteuil =

- Full name: L'Association sportive Auteuil
- Ground: Stade Numa-Daly; Nouméa, New Caledonia
- Capacity: 16,000
- League: New Caledonia Second Level

AS Auteuil is a New Caledonian football club competing at the second level New Caledonia Second Level. It is based in Dumbéa.

== Achievements ==
- New Caledonia Cup:

0–1 (aet) in Final 1999 vs JS Traput
