= AS Poum =

- Full name: L'Association sportive Poum
- Ground: Poum, New Caledonia
- Capacity: 1,000
- League: New Caledonia Second Level
- 2006–2007: 5th

AS Poum is a New Caledonian football club competing at the second level New Caledonia Second Level. It is based in Poum.

== Achievements ==
- New Caledonia Division Honneur: 1

1998
