= USC Nouméa =

New Caledonian football team

- Full name: Union Sportive Calédonienne Nouméa
- Ground: Stade Numa-Daly; Nouméa, New Caledonia
- Capacity: 16,000
- League: New Caledonia Second Level
- 2006–07: 8th

USC Nouméa is a New Caledonian football team playing at the New Caledonia Second Level. It is based in Nouméa. Their home stadium is Stade Numa-Daly.

== Achievements ==
- New Caledonia Division Honneur: 2

1962, 1963
