= Jope Namawa =

Fijian footballer

Personal information
- Full name: Jope Leka Namawa
- Date of birth: 4 May 1974 (age 52)
- Place of birth: Fiji
- Position: Defender

Senior career*
Years	Team	Apps	(Gls)
2001–	Ba		

International career
2001–2002	Fiji	6	(1)
- * Club domestic league appearances and goals

Jope Leka Namawa (born 4 May 1974) is a Fijian former professional footballer who played as a defender.

== Career ==
Namawa spent his club career playing for Ba in the National Football League.
