= AS Horizon Patho =

Association football club in New Caledonia

- Full name: Association Sportive Horizon Patho
- Founded: 1967
- Ground: Stade La Roche
- Capacity: 3,000
- Manager: Auguste Washetine
- League: New Caledonia Super Ligue
- 2023: 8th
Home colours	Away colours

Association Sportive Horizon Patho is a football club of New Caledonia, competing in the New Caledonia Super Ligue.

== Stadium ==
The current the club stadium is the Stade La Roche, in the city of Maré, with a capacity for 3,000 spectators.

== Players ==
Among the team's players are:

- Goalkeepers:

Wilfried Caroine (23 years old) and
Luc Washetine.

- Defenders:

Jean-Baptiste Caroine (21 years old),
Ludovic Wakanumuné (38 years old),
Kiam Wanesse and
Luc-André Washetine.

- Midfielder:

Pierre Wawia (21 years old),
Roberto Waia (19 years old),
Henri Caroine (39 years old),
Yoan Bearune (19 years old) and
Jean-Claude Jewiné.
