= Serge Martinengo de Novack =

French professional football manager

Personal information
- Place of birth: France

Managerial career
- Years: Team
- 2002–2004: New Caledonia

Serge Martinengo de Novack is a French professional football manager.

== Career ==
Since 2002 until 2004 he coached the New Caledonia national football team.
