= AS Wetr =

Association football club in New Caledonia

- Full name: Association Sportive de Wetr
- Ground: Stade Edouard Pentecost
- Capacity: 1,000
- League: New Caledonia Super Ligue
- 2023: 10th
Home colours	Away colours

Association Sportive de Wetr, or simply AS Wetr, is a New Caledonian football team, competing in the New Caledonia Super Ligue. Its colors are blue and white.

== Stadium ==
The current the club stadium is the Stade Edouard Pentecost, in the city of Nouméa, with a capacity for 1,000 spectators.

== Squad ==
Updated May 2021. Note: Flags indicate national team as defined under FIFA eligibility rules; some limited exceptions apply. Players may hold more than one non-FIFA nationality.

No.	Pos.	Nation	Player
1	GK	NCL	Anthony Ajapuhnya
2	DF	NCL	Nicolas Luepak
3	DF	NCL	Medhi Mapou
4	DF	NCL	Robert Caihe
5	MF	NCL	Joseph Milie (captain)
6	DF	NCL	Henri Kapoeri
7	FW	NCL	Raymond Luewadria
8	MF	NCL	Eugene Sakilia
9	FW	NCL	Andre Matha
10	MF	NCL	Johan Idrele
11	MF	NCL	Romarick Luepak
12	GK	NCL	Jimmy Wahnapo
13	DF	NCL	Isaac Simane
14	DF	NCL	Kiam Wanesse
15	DF	NCL	Romaric Walone
16	GK	NCL	Germain Ita
