= AS Qanono =

Association football club in New Caledonia

- Full name: AS Qanono
- Founded: 1968
- Ground: Stade de Hnassé
- Capacity: 1680
- League: New Caledonia Super Ligue
- 2021: 7
Home colours	Away colours

AS Qanono is a football club of New Caledonia, competing in the New Caledonia Super Ligue. Its colors are red and blue.

== Stadium ==
The current the club stadium is the Stade de Hnassé, in the city of Wé, with a capacity for 1680 spectators.
