= JS Traput =

- Full name: Jeunesse Sportive Trapu
- Ground: Lifou, New Caledonia
- League: New Caledonia Second Level

JS Traput is a New Caledonian football team playing at the second level New Caledonia Second Level. It is based in Lifou.

== Achievements ==
- New Caledonia Division Honneur: 1

1996

- New Caledonia Cup 2:

1998, 1999
