= AS Tiga Sport =

Association football club in New Caledonia

- Full name: Association Sportive Tiga Sport
- Founded: 1965
- Ground: Stade Numa-Daly Magenta
- Capacity: 10,000
- Chairman: Pascal Dokunengo
- Manager: Leonardo Lopez
- League: New Caledonia Super Ligue
- 2025: Champions
Home colours	Away colours

Association Sportive Tiga Sport is a professional football club of New Caledonia, competing in the New Caledonia Super Ligue. Its colours are red and white.

== Stadium ==
The current Tiga Sport stadium is the Stade Numa Daly, in the city of Nouméa, with a capacity of about 10,000 spectators.

== Honours ==
=== Domestic ===
New Caledonia Super Ligue

- Champions (2): 2020, 2022, 2025
