= New Caledonia Super Ligue =

New Caledonian Super League
- Founded: 1933; 93 years ago
- Country: New Caledonia
- Confederation: OFC (Oceania)
- Number of clubs: 10 (in 2024)
- Level on pyramid: 1/4
- Relegation to: Promotion d'Honneur
- Domestic cup: New Caledonia Cup
- International cup: OFC Champions League
- Current champions: AS Tiga Sport (2025)
- Most championships: AS Magenta (15)
- Website: www.fedcalfoot.com
- Current: 2025 New Caledonian Super League

The New Caledonian Super League (French: Super Ligue de Nouvelle-Calédonie) is the top division of the New Caledonian football league system. It is run by the New Caledonian Football Federation.

The league is played as a double round robin between the top-4 clubs from the Division Honneur of Grande Terre and the champions of the Îles.

== Previous winners ==
Champions so far are:

- 1933: Impassible
- 1934–1949: unknown
- 1950: Impassible
- 1951: Impassible
- 1952: Indépendante
- 1953: Impassible
- 1954: Indépendante
- 1955: not awarded
- 1956: Impassible
- 1957: PLGC
- 1958: PLGC
- 1959: PLGC
- 1960: Impassible
- 1961: Île des Pins
- 1962: USC Nouméa
- 1963: USC Nouméa
- 1964: JS Vallée du Tir bt UAC Yaté
- 1965: JS Vallée du Tir
- 1966: AS Frégate
- 1967: JS Vallée du Tir
- 1968: JS Vallée du Tir
- 1969: Le Nickel
- 1970: Le Nickel
- 1971: Stade Français de Tadine 1–0 JS Vallée du Tir
- 1972: Saint Jean-Baptiste Nathalo
- 1973: GS Ouvéa
- 1974: Gaïtcha FCN
- 1975: UAC Yaté bt Croix Bleue
- 1976: Le Nickel
- 1977: Kehdek de Koumac
- 1978: Gélima Canala bt AS Lössi (Nouméa)
- 1979: JS Baco
- 1980: RS Koumac
- 1981: USL Gélima
- 1982: JS Baco
- 1983: CA Saint-Louis
- 1984: AS Frégate (Mont-Dore) 3–0 AS Païta
- 1985: AS Kunié 1–1 CA Saint-Louis (3–2, pens)
- 1986: AS 6e km
- 1987: CA Saint-Louis
- 1988: CA Saint-Louis
- 1989: Wé Luécilla
- 1990: Gaïtcha FCN
- 1991: Wé Luécilla
- 1992: AS Kunié
- 1993: Wé Luécilla bt AS Magenta Le Nickel
- 1994: JS Baco (Koné) bt AS Magenta Le Nickel
- 1995: JS Baco (Koné) bt JS Traput (Lifou)
- 1996: JS Traput (Lifou) bt JS Baco (Koné)
- 1997: JS Baco (Koné) 2–1 CA Saint-Louis
- 1998: AS Poum 4–2 JS Traput (Lifou)
- 1999: Gaïtcha FCN (Nouméa) 2–2 AS Auteuil (Nouméa) (4–3, pens)
- 2000: JS Baco (Koné) 1–0 JS Traput (Lifou)
- 2001: JS Baco (Koné) 1–0 AS Mont-Dore
- 2002: AS Mont-Dore 2–2 JS Baco (Koné) (4–3, pens)
- 2002–03: AS Magenta (Nouméa) 5–3 JS Baco (Koné) (aet)
- 2003–04: AS Magenta (Nouméa) 3–1 AS Mont-Dore
- 2004–05: AS Magenta (Nouméa) 3–2 AS Mont-Dore
- 2005–06: AS Mont-Dore
- 2006–07: JS Baco (Koné) bt AS Lössi (Nouméa)
- 2007–08: AS Magenta (Nouméa) bt AS Mont-Dore
- 2008–09: AS Magenta (Nouméa) bt AS Mont-Dore
- 2009: AS Magenta (Nouméa) bt Hienghène Sport
- 2010: AS Mont-Dore bt AS Magenta (Nouméa)
- 2011: AS Mont-Dore
- 2012: AS Magenta
- 2013: Gaïtcha FCN
- 2014: AS Magenta
- 2015: AS Magenta
- 2016: AS Magenta
- 2017: Hienghène Sport
- 2018: AS Magenta
- 2019: Hienghène Sport
- 2020: AS Tiga Sport
- 2021: Hienghène Sport
- 2022: AS Tiga Sport
- 2023: AS Magenta
- 2024: not awarded
- 2025: AS Tiga Sport

== Titles by team ==
Club	City	Titles	Last title
AS Magenta (includes Le Nickel)	Nouméa	15	2023
JS Baco	Koné	8	2006–07
Impassible	Nouméa	6	1960
Gaïtcha FCN	Nouméa	4	2013
AS Tiga Sport	Nouméa	3	2025
AS Mont-Dore	Le Mont-Dore	4	2011
CA Saint-Louis	Nouméa	3	1988
AS Frégate	Nouméa	3	1984
Hienghène Sport	Hienghène	3	2021
JS Vallée du Tir	Nouméa	3	1968
PLGC	Nouméa	3	1959
Wé-Luecilla	Nouméa	3	1993
Indépendante	Nouméa	2	1954
AS Kunié	Nouméa	2	1992
USC Nouméa	Nouméa	2	1963
USL Gélima	Canala	2	1981
AS 6e km	Nouméa	1	1986
Île des Pins	L'Île-des-Pins	1	1961
Kehdek de Koumac	Koumac	1	1977
RS Koumac	Koumac	1	1980
GS Ouvéa	Ouvéa	1	1973
AS Poum	Poum	1	1998
Saint Jean-Baptiste Nathalo	Nouméa	1	1972
Stade Français Tadine	Tadine	1	1971
JS Traput	Lifou	1	1996
UAC Yaté	Yaté	1	1975

== Top goalscorers ==
Season	Best scorers	Team	Goals
2005–06	(New Caledonia) Michel Hmaé	Magenta	12
2005–06	(New Caledonia) Stanley Kabeu	Mont-Dore	12
2005–06	(New Caledonia) Julio Thomo	Thio Sport	12
2006–07	(New Caledonia) Philippe Kokone	Magenta	11
2007–08	(New Caledonia) Luther Wahnyamalla	Lössi	15
2008–09	(New Caledonia) Kalaye Gnipate	Mont-Dore	14
2009	(New Caledonia) Jean Wahnyamalla	Lössi	14
2013	(New Caledonia) Jean-Philippe Saïko	Gaïtcha	25
2021	(New Caledonia) Kevin Nemia	Magenta	16
2022	(New Caledonia) Lues Waya	Tiga Sport	24
2023	(New Caledonia) Jean Paul Wamejo	Horizon Patho	15
2024	(New Caledonia) Germain Haewegene	Magenta	13

== Multiple hat-tricks ==
Rank	Country	Player	Hat-tricks
1	(New Caledonia)	Kevin Nemia	3
1	(New Caledonia)	Lues Waya	3
3	(New Caledonia)	Germain Haewegene	2
3	(New Caledonia)	Jordan Wetria	2
5	(New Caledonia)	Yoann Bako	1
5	(New Caledonia)	Cyril Drawilo	1
5	(New Caledonia)	Patrick Gohe	1
5	(New Caledonia)	Hahnatadra Haewegene	1
5	(New Caledonia)	Manuala Hnaia	1
5	(New Caledonia)	Maurice Kaemo	1
5	(New Caledonia)	Ezechiel Leack	1
5	(New Caledonia)	Shafi Mandaoue	1
5	(New Caledonia)	Robert Neoere	1
5	(New Caledonia)	Fonzy Ranchain	1
5	(New Caledonia)	Willy Reid	1
5	(New Caledonia)	Titouan Richard	1
5	(New Caledonia)	Amy Roine	1
5	(New Caledonia)	Jean-Philippe Saïko	1
5	(New Caledonia)	Maraima Tchao	1
5	(New Caledonia)	Willy Waheo	1
5	(New Caledonia)	Wily Welepane	1
