= SC Ne Drehu =

Association football club in New Caledonia

- Full name: SC Ne Drehu
- Ground: Stade de Hnassé
- Capacity: 1,680
- League: New Caledonia Super Ligue
- 2023: 6th
Home colours	Away colours

SC Ne Drehu is a football club of New Caledonia, competing in the New Caledonia Super Ligue. Its colors are orange and white.

== Stadium ==
The current the club stadium is the Stade de Hnassé, in the city of Wé, with a capacity for 1680 spectators.

== Squad ==
Updated June 2022. Note: Flags indicate national team as defined under FIFA eligibility rules; some limited exceptions apply. Players may hold more than one non-FIFA nationality.

No.	Pos.	Nation	Player
1	GK	NCL	Nicoden Hmaen
2	DF	NCL	Trotro Ukajo
3	DF	NCL	Dylan Sio
4	DF	NCL	Emile Hace
6	DF	NCL	Andre Luepack
7	MF	NCL	Mayrone Xalite
8	MF	NCL	Nathanael Hmaen
9	FW	NCL	Jordan Wetria
10	FW	NCL	Mone Wamowe

No.	Pos.	Nation	Player
11	MF	NCL	Patrick Gohe
12	MF	NCL	Yorick Hnautra
13	FW	NCL	Maurice Kaemo
14	MF	NCL	Ludovic Forest
16	MF	NCL	Paul Xalite
18	DF	NCL	Ludwig Zeoula
20	DF	NCL	Claudio Forest
21	FW	NCL	Kevin Maitran
26	MF	NCL	Renzo Wejieme
