= Hienghène Sport =

Soccer club

- Full name: Hienghène Sport
- Nickname: Les Bleus
- Short name: HIE
- Founded: 1997
- Ground: Stade de Hienghène
- Capacity: 1,800
- Chairman: Jean-Pierre Djaïwé
- Manager: Félix Tagawa
- League: New Caledonia Super Ligue
- 2025: 3rd
- Website: hienghene-sport.footeo.com
Home colours	Away colours	Third colours

Hienghène Sport (French: [jəŋ.ɡɛːn spɔʁ]; Fwâi: Hyehen Sport) is a New Caledonian football team from Hienghène playing in the New Caledonia Super Ligue, New Caledonia.

== History ==
The club was founded in Hienghène, North Province in 1997 and made its first participation in the New Caledonia Super Ligue in 1999 on the territory of France. Hienghène has won the national league two times, being the first in 2017, after the deduction of two points due to failing to provide referees, qualified trainers or youth teams.

The club has two appearances in the 7th round of the Coupe de France, following its success in the New Caledonia Cup. During the 2014 edition, Hienghène lost 2–1 to AS Poissy, a Championnat National 3 club. Later in 2016, they lost 3–2 against RC Épernay Champagne, also a Championnat National 3 club. In 2019, the club competed again in the Coupe de France, but lost 3–1 in the 7th round against ASPV Strasbourg.

They won the 2019 OFC Champions League, becoming the first New Caledonian team to do so. Along the way, they conceded only one goal. In the final they defeated fellow New Caledonian club AS Magenta by a score of 1–0, with Antoine Roine scoring the only goal.

In 2019, they became the second Oceanian club not from Australia or New Zealand to compete in the FIFA Club World Cup (after Hekari United from Papua New Guinea, in 2010). In the 2019 FIFA Club World Cup, they faced the hosts, Qatari side Al Sadd in the playoff round on 11 December. Hienghène managed to take them to extra time, with Roine scoring their only goal, but Al Sadd scored twice in extra time and Hienghène were eliminated 3–1.

== Honours ==
=== Domestic ===
- New Caledonia Super Ligue
  - Champions (3): 2017, 2019, 2021
- New Caledonia Cup
  - Winners (6): 2013, 2015, 2019, 2020, 2022, 2023

=== International ===
- OFC Champions League
  - Winners: 2019

== Players ==
=== Current squad ===
Squad for 2022 OFC Champions League

Note: Flags indicate national team as defined under FIFA eligibility rules; some limited exceptions apply. Players may hold more than one non-FIFA nationality.

No.	Pos.	Nation	Player
1	GK	NCL	Rocky Nyikeine
2	DF	NCL	Joris Gorendiawé
3	DF	NCL	William Yentao
4	DF	NCL	Bruno Hyanem
8	MF	NCL	Fonzy Ranchain
10	MF	NCL	Miguel Kayara
11	FW	NCL	Bertrand Kaï
12	FW	NCL	Antoine Roïné
14	MF	NCL	Dann Djaiwe
15	MF	NCL	Clifton Kanva
18	MF	NCL	Kevin Tein
19	MF	NCL	Joseph Athalé
20	MF	NCL	Jean-Claude Ihily
22	DF	NCL	Jean-Luc Decoire
29	FW	NCL	Shaffy Mandaoue
27	DF	NCL	Emile Béaruné

No.	Pos.	Nation	Player
31	GK	NCL	Christopher Yeiwene
32	DF	NCL	Jean-Baptiste Caroine
34	GK	NCL	Jacques Nyikeine
—	DF	NCL	Yvanoe Bamy
—	DF	NCL	Jordan Dinet
—	DF	NCL	Roy Kayara
—	DF	NCL	Georges Wakanumune
—	MF	NCL	George Bamy
—	MF	NCL	Norbert Bouanou
—	MF	NCL	Geordy Gony
—	MF	NCL	Cédric Sansot
—	FW	NCL	Brice Dahite
—	FW	NCL	Nelson Kaï
—	FW	NCL	Giani Kayara
—	FW	NCL	Rayan Oue

== Staff ==
=== Current technical staff ===
Position	Name
Caretaker manager	(French Polynesia) Felix Tagawa
Assistant coach	(New Caledonia) Kevin Coma
Sport Director	(New Caledonia) Jean François Poma
Delegate	(New Caledonia) Rhitchi Bouanou
Manager	(New Caledonia) Henry Nahiet
