= AS Kunié =

Association football club in New Caledonia

- Full name: Association Sportive Kunié
- Founded: 1958
- Ground: Stade Numa-Daly Magenta
- Capacity: 10,000
- League: New Caledonia Super Ligue
- 2023: 9th
Home colours	Away colours

Association Sportive Kunié is a football club of New Caledonia, competing in the New Caledonia Super Ligue. Its colors are red and white.

== Stadium ==
The current the club stadium is the Stade Numa Daly, in the city of Nouméa, with a capacity for 10,000 spectators.

== Titles ==
The team was champion of two editions of the New Caledonia Super Ligue: 1985 and 1992.

== Players ==
Note: Flags indicate national team as defined under FIFA eligibility rules; some limited exceptions apply. Players may hold more than one non-FIFA nationality.

No.	Pos.	Nation	Player
—	GK	NCL	Dimitri Cagnewa
—	GK	NCL	Julien Douépéré
—	DF	NCL	Philippe Wakoumé
—	DF	NCL	Arnaud Wemama
—	DF	NCL	Louis-Daniel Douépéré
—	DF	NCL	Angélo Apikaoua
—	MF	NCL	Patrick Koteureu
—	MF	NCL	Daniel Kouathe (captain)
—	MF	NCL	Narcisse Koteureu
—	MF	NCL	Jean-Marvin Vendegou
—	MF	NCL	Vincent Koteureu
—	FW	NCL	Mathieu Douépéré
—	FW	NCL	Roberto Neoere
—	FW	NCL	Gianni Manmieu
—	FW	NCL	Iréné Koteureu
—	FW	NCL	Kevin Takamatsu
—	FW	NCL	Jean-Paul Haudra

Manager: (New Caledonia) Kenjy Vendegou
