= JS Baco =

- Full name: Jeunesse Sportive Baco
- Ground: Stade Yoshida; Koné, New Caledonia
- Capacity: 1,000
- Manager: Raymond Wayaridri
- League: New Caledonia Division Honneur
- 2007–08: 2nd
Home colours	Away colours

JS Baco is a New Caledonian football team playing at the top level. It is based in Koné. Their home stadium is Stade Yoshida.

== Achievements ==
- New Caledonia Division Honneur: 6

1994, 1995, 1997, 2000, 2001, 2007

- New Caledonia Cup: 5

1980, 1984, 1987, 1991, 1995

== The club in the French football structure ==
- French Cup : 1 appearance

2006/07

== Performance in OFC competitions ==
- OFC Champions League: 1 appearance

Best: 2° in Preliminary Round 2008
2008: 2° in Preliminary Round
