= ASC Gaïca =

Association football club in New Caledonia

- Full name: Association Sportive et Culturelle de Gaïtcha
- Ground: Stade Numa-Daly; Nouméa, New Caledonia
- Capacity: 16,000
- Manager: Kevin Coma
- League: New Caledonia Division Honneur
- 2025: 2nd
Home colours

ASC Gaïca is a New Caledonia football team playing in the local top division, the New Caledonia Division Honneur. The team is based in Nouméa.

In 2025, Gaïca played in the New Caledonia Super Ligue.

== Achievements ==
- New Caledonia Division Honneur
  - Champions (2): 1999, 2013
- Champion du Sud
  - Champions: 2022
