= AS Mont-Dore =

Association football club in New Caledonia

- Full name: L'Association Sportive Mont Dore
- Ground: Stade Numa-Daly Magenta, New Caledonia
- Capacity: 10,000
- Manager: Christophe Oiremoin
- League: New Caledonia Division Honneur
- 2023: 7th
Home colours	Away colours

AS Mont-Dore is a New Caledonia football club competing in the local top division, the New Caledonia Division Honneur.

The team is based in Le Mont-Dore, a commune in the suburbs of Nouméa, the capital city of the French territory.

== Honours ==
- New Caledonia Division Honneur
  - Champions (4): 2002, 2006, 2010, 2011
- New Caledonia Cup
  - Winners (3): 2006, 2008, 2009

== Performance in OFC competitions ==
- OFC Champions League: 2 appearances

Best: 3° in Group A in 2007
2007: 3° in Group A
2012: 4° in Group A
