= AS Magenta =

- Full name: L'Association Sportive Magenta
- Ground: Stade Numa-Daly Magenta; Nouméa, New Caledonia
- Capacity: 10,000
- Chairman: Michel Messeaud
- Manager: Alain Moizan
- League: New Caledonia Division Honneur
- 2023: Champions
Home colours	Away colours

AS Magenta is a New Caledonian football team playing at the top level. It is based in Nouméa. Their home stadium is Stade Numa-Daly Magenta.

== History ==
Originally called the Nickel Nouméa Sports Association (Nouméa ASLN), the club experienced its first period of glory in the late 1960s and 1970s. Winner of the New Caledonia Cup for four successive years between 1969 and 1972, followed by a 1975 win, the team was also a finalist in 1968, 1974, 1976 and 1977.

Under the new name of A.S. Magenta, the club gradually returned to the forefront of the New Caledonian football scene in the early 1990s. Cup finalist in 1991, the team won again in 1996, followed by a series of six straight wins between 2000 and 2005, making it the most successful team in the competition.

AS Magenta won the Championship in 2003, 2004 and 2005. ASM was also champion of The Overseas Football Cup by beating A.S. Pirae in 2003 (2–2 in the first leg, 2–2 then the second leg, 4–3 after penalty shootout). AS Magenta season in the 2005 season, in addition to winning the cup and the championship of New Caledonia, reached the final of the OFC Champions League in June 2005 after finishing Group B in the top spot. However, the Caledonians bowed to the Australian team Sydney FC (0–2).

The 2006 season is much less successful for AS Magenta. In addition to being eliminated before the finals of the OFC Champions League, the club also failed to win the title of champion of New Caledonia for the first time in four years, on top of failing to win the New Caledonia Cup for the first time since 1999.

In the 2007 season, under the coaching of former footballer André Bodji, the team won the championship three consecutive seasons. Following the 2010 win, the team played in the 2010–11 Coupe de France, becoming the first New Caledonian club to pass the seventh round of the preliminary phase, before being beaten in the eighth round by Paris FC (4–0).

In November 2014, the club won for the ninth time the New Caledonia Cup, after beating rivals A.S. Lössi 3–1, ensuring its place in the seventh round in the Coupe de France.

== Honours ==
- New Caledonia Division Honneur: 12

2002–03, 2003–04, 2004–05, 2007–08, 2008–09, 2009, 2012, 2014, 2015, 2016, 2018, 2023

- New Caledonia Cup: 16

1969, 1970, 1971, 1972, 1975, 1996, 2000, 2001, 2002, 2002–03, 2003–04, 2004–05, 2010, 2014, 2016, 2018

- Pacific French Territories Cup: 2

2002–03, 2004–05

== The club in the French football structure ==
- Coupe de France : 7 appearances

1994–95, 2000–01, 2001–02, 2002–03, 2003–04, 2004–05, 2005–06, 2010–11, 2013–14

== Current squad ==
Squad for 2020 OFC Champions League

Note: Flags indicate national team as defined under FIFA eligibility rules; some limited exceptions apply. Players may hold more than one non-FIFA nationality.

No.	Pos.	Nation	Player
—	GK	NCL	Jelen Ixoéé
—	GK	NCL	Nicodem Hmaen
—	DF	NCL	Jean-Brice Wadriako
—	DF	NCL	Warren Saïko
—	DF	NCL	Mickael Tiaou
—	DF	NCL	Jean-Marie Hmaloko
—	DF	NCL	Kevin Maitran
—	DF	NCL	Henri Ujicas
—	DF	NCL	Jean-Christ Wajoka
—	DF	NCL	Maxime Pelluchon
—	DF	NCL	Gaétan Gope-Iwate
—	MF	NCL	Damien Wanapopo

No.	Pos.	Nation	Player
—	MF	NCL	Watanang Hnyeillitr
—	MF	NCL	Jacky Wetewea
—	MF	NCL	Didier Simane
—	MF	NCL	Angelo Ihmeling
—	MF	NCL	Fonzy Ranchain
—	MF	NCL	Shene Wélépane
—	MF	NCL	Wilsen Poameno
—	FW	NCL	Nathanael Hmaen
—	FW	NCL	Jeremy Jeno
—	FW	NCL	Kevin Nemia
—	FW	NCL	Renaldo Nonmeu

=== Staff ===
Position	Name
Coach	(France) Alain Moizan
Physiotherapist	(New Caledonia) John Wadrobert
Doctor	(New Caledonia) Stéphane Campana
Media Manager	(New Caledonia) Pascal Uichi

== Performance in OFC competitions ==
- OFC Champions League: 5 appearances

Best: Final 2019
2010: 3° in Group A
2011: 3° in Group B
2017: Semi-finals
2018: Group Stage
2019: Final

- Oceania Club Championship: 2 appearances

2004–05: 2nd Place – Lost against Sydney FC (Australia) 2 – 0 (stage 4 of 4)
2006: First Round – Group B – 4th place – 3 pts (stage 2 of 4)
