= AS Lössi =

- Full name: L'Association Sportive Lössi
- Ground: Stade Numa-Daly; Nouméa, New Caledonia
- Capacity: 10,000
- Manager: Victor Wejieme
- League: New Caledonia Division Honneur
- 2023: 5th
| Home colours | Away colours |

AS Lössi is a New Caledonian football team playing at the top level. It is based in Nouméa. Their home stadium is Stade Numa-Daly.

== Achievements ==
- New Caledonia Cup: 3

2006–07, 2012, 2017

== The club in the French football structure ==
- French Cup: 3 appearances

2007–08, 2012–13, 2017–18
