= Stade Numa-Daly Magenta =

Multi-purpose stadium in Nouméa, New Caledonia

Stade Numa-Daly (official name)
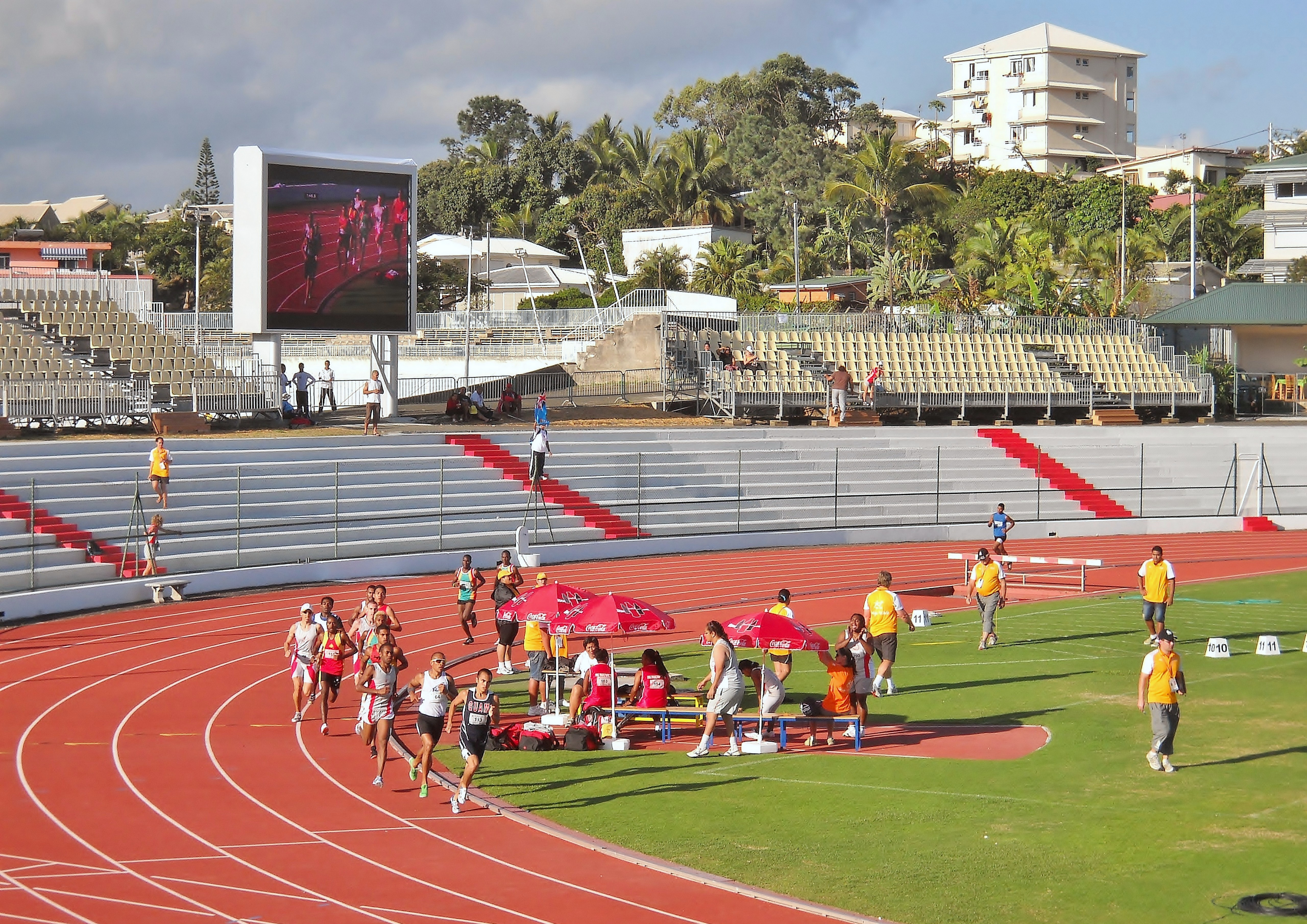
- Interactive map of Stade Numa-Daly (official name)
- Location: 2 Rue Maurice-Herzog; 98800 Magenta Nouméa
- Coordinates: 22°15′55.9″S 166°28′3.4″E
- Owner: New Caledonia Government
- Capacity: 10,000

Construction
- Opened: 1966
- Renovated: 1985, 2003, 2008, and 2011

Tenants
- New Caledonia national football team AS Magenta; AS Lössi; New Caledonia national rugby league team

Stade Numa-Daly Magenta is a multi-use stadium in Nouméa, New Caledonia. It is currently used mostly for football matches. The stadium holds 10,000. It is currently the home ground of the New Caledonia national football team and was one of the host venues at the 2011 Pacific Games for the men's football tournament.
