= New Caledonian Football Federation =

Governing body of association football in New Caledonia

OFC
- Founded: 1928
- Headquarters: Nouméa
- FIFA affiliation: 2004
- OFC affiliation: 1999 (Provisional member) 2004
- President: Gilles Tavergeux
- Website: http://www.fedcalfoot.com

The New Caledonian Football Federation (French: Fédération calédonienne de football, FCF) is the governing body of football, futsal and beach soccer in New Caledonia, a sui generis collectivity of France. It is a protectorate of the French Football Federation (FFF), and a member of both the Oceanian Football Confederation (OFC) and the International Federation of Association Football (FIFA).
