= Tahiti at the FIFA Confederations Cup =

Football tournament results

Tahiti has only participated in the FIFA Confederations Cup once in the 2013 edition after winning the 2012 OFC Nations Cup. The team finished last, and was defeated in all matches with harsh results

== 2013 FIFA Confederations Cup ==
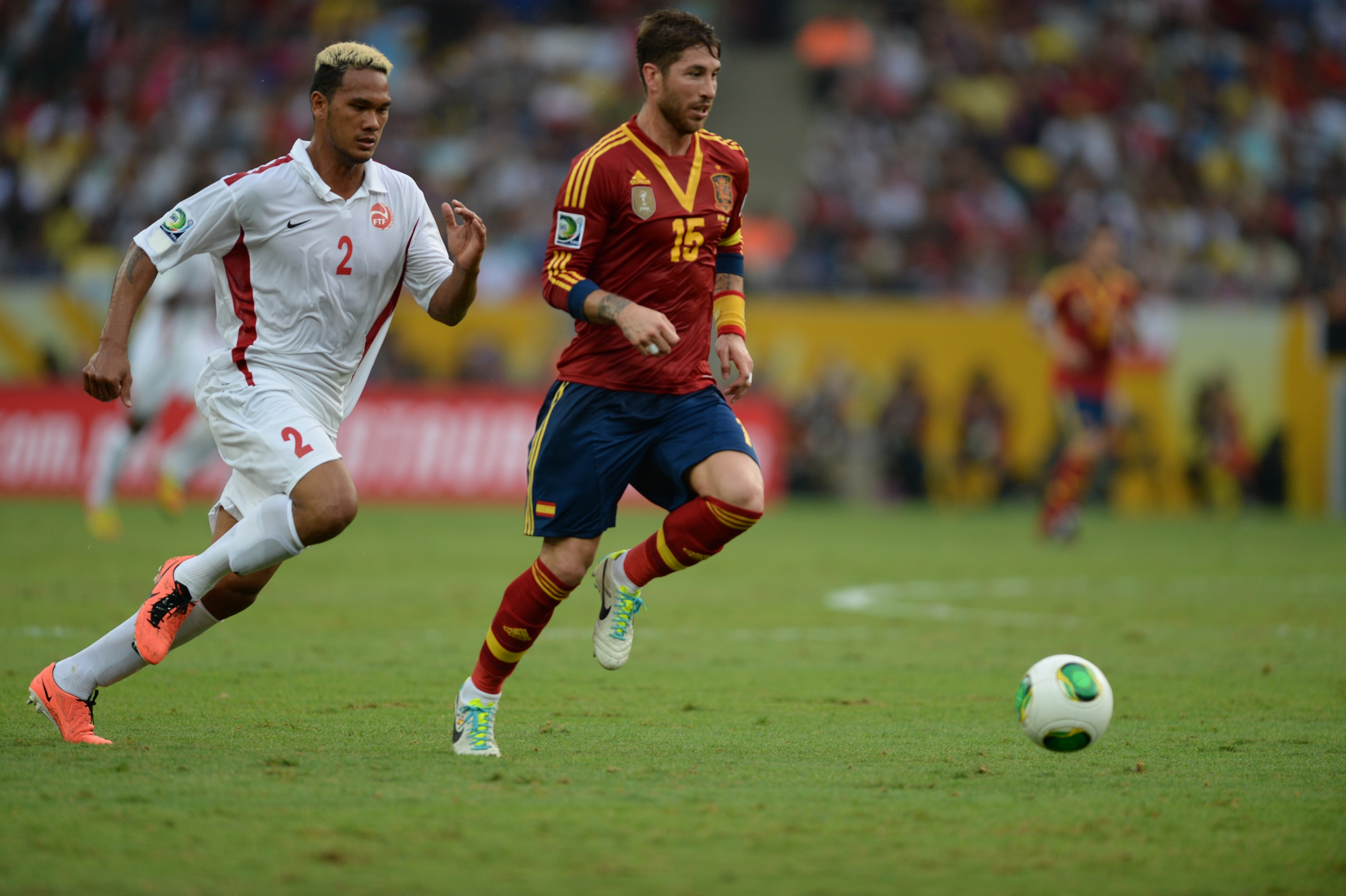
Spain v Tahiti

By winning the 2012 OFC Nations Cup, Tahiti qualified for the 2013 Confederations Cup, held in Brazil, for the first time. Tahiti is the first – and, following the tournament's abolition, only – team which participated in the Confederations Cup but has never qualified for the FIFA World Cup. On 17 June 2013, Tahiti lost 1–6 to Nigeria in the 2013 Confederations Cup in Belo Horizonte, with Jonathan Tehau scoring the goal for Tahiti in the second half with a header from a corner; Tahiti fans still rejoiced in the prospect of scoring a goal in an international tournament. On 20 June, Tahiti lost 10–0 against Spain to equal their largest ever loss against New Zealand nine years earlier. On 23 June 2013, Tahiti was beaten 8–0 by Uruguay.

In all, Tahiti conceded 24 goals and scored 1 to end with a goal differential of −23, the worst of any national team in any major competition. However, even with the poor record and heavy defeats, Tahiti's underdog qualities gathered significant respect from the people of Brazil, who always cheered for them in every match. Spanish coach Vicente del Bosque, and strikers Fernando Torres and David Villa – who scored four and three goals respectively against Tahiti – complimented the team's fair play.

=== Squad ===
Head coach: Eddy Etaeta

Etaeta named his 23-man squad on 24 May 2013.

No.	Pos.	Player	Date of birth (age)	Caps	Goals	Club
1	GK	Mikaël Roche	24 December 1982 (aged 30)	6	0	(Tahitian Football Federation) AS Dragon
2	FW	Alvin Tehau	10 April 1989 (aged 24)	16	6	(Tahitian Football Federation) AS Tefana
3	FW	Marama Vahirua	12 May 1980 (aged 33)	0	0	(French Football Federation) Nancy (Note: Marama Vahirua was on loan at Panthrakikos.)
4	DF	Teheivarii Ludivion	1 July 1989 (aged 23)	15	1	(Tahitian Football Federation) AS Tefana
5	DF	Tamatoa Wagemann	18 March 1980 (aged 33)	6	0	(Tahitian Football Federation) AS Dragon
6	MF	Henri Caroine	7 September 1981 (aged 31)	6	0	(Tahitian Football Federation) AS Dragon
7	MF	Heimano Bourebare	15 May 1989 (aged 24)	12	1	(Tahitian Football Federation) AS Tefana
8	DF	Stephane Faatiarau	13 March 1990 (aged 23)	11	1	(Tahitian Football Federation) AS Tefana
9	FW	Teaonui Tehau	1 September 1992 (aged 20)	16	8	(Tahitian Football Federation) AS Dragon
10	DF	Nicolas Vallar (c)	22 October 1983 (aged 29)	12	3	(Tahitian Football Federation) AS Dragon
11	FW	Stanley Atani	27 January 1990 (aged 23)	15	5	(Tahitian Football Federation) AS Tefana
12	DF	Edson Lemaire	31 October 1990 (aged 22)	3	0	(Tahitian Football Federation) AS Dragon
13	FW	Steevy Chong Hue	26 January 1990 (aged 23)	19	7	(Tahitian Football Federation) AS Dragon
14	MF	Rainui Aroita	25 January 1994 (aged 19)	1	0	(Tahitian Football Federation) AS Tamarii Faa'a
15	MF	Lorenzo Tehau	10 April 1989 (aged 24)	18	7	(Tahitian Football Federation) AS Tefana
16	FW	Ricky Aitamai	22 December 1991 (aged 21)	1	0	(Tahitian Football Federation) AS Vénus
17	MF	Jonathan Tehau	9 January 1988 (aged 25)	22	4	(Tahitian Football Federation) AS Tamarii Faa'a
18	MF	Yohann Tihoni	20 July 1994 (aged 18)	1	0	(Tahitian Football Federation) AS Roniu
19	DF	Vincent Simon	28 September 1983 (aged 29)	21	1	(Tahitian Football Federation) AS Dragon
20	DF	Yannick Vero	28 February 1990 (aged 23)	5	0	(Tahitian Football Federation) AS Dragon
21	FW	Samuel Hnanyine	1 March 1984 (aged 29)	1	1	(Tahitian Football Federation) AS Dragon
22	GK	Gilbert Meriel	11 November 1986 (aged 26)	3	0	(Tahitian Football Federation) AS Tefana
23	GK	Xavier Samin	1 January 1978 (aged 35)	28	0	(Tahitian Football Federation) AS Dragon

=== Group stage ===
==== Standings ====
Pos	Team	Pld	W	D	L	GF	GA	GD	Pts	Qualification
1	Spain	3	3	0	0	15	1	+14	9	Advance to knockout stage
2	Uruguay	3	2	0	1	11	3	+8	6	Advance to knockout stage
3	Nigeria	3	1	0	2	7	6	+1	3	
4	Tahiti	3	0	0	3	1	24	−23	0	

Source: FIFA

==== Tahiti vs Nigeria ====
17 June 2013
19:00

Tahiti	1–6	Nigeria
J. Tehau 54'	Report	Vallar 5' (o.g.); Oduamadi 10', 26', 76'; J. Tehau 69' (o.g.); Echiéjilé 80'

Estádio Mineirão, Belo Horizonte
Attendance: 20,187
Referee: Joel Aguilar (El Salvador)

Tahiti	Nigeria

GK	23	Xavier Samin
CB	4	Teheivarii Ludivion
CB	10	Nicolas Vallar (c)	(substituted off) 54'
CB	17	Jonathan Tehau
RM	19	Vincent Simon	(substituted off) 78'
CM	7	Heimano Bourebare
CM	6	Henri Caroine
LM	16	Ricky Aitamai
RW	3	Marama Vahirua	(substituted off) 69'
LW	13	Steevy Chong Hue
CF	2	Alvin Tehau
Substitutions:
DF	8	Stephane Faatiarau	(substituted on) 54'
MF	11	Stanley Atani	(substituted on) 69'
DF	12	Edson Lemaire	(substituted on) 78'
Manager:
Eddy Etaeta

GK	1	Vincent Enyeama (c)
RB	5	Efe Ambrose
CB	2	Godfrey Oboabona
CB	22	Kenneth Omeruo	(yellow card) 41'	(substituted off) 74'
LB	3	Uwa Elderson Echiéjilé
RM	13	Fegor Ogude
CM	10	John Obi Mikel
LM	19	Sunday Mba		(substituted off) 57'
RF	20	Nnamdi Oduamadi
CF	14	Anthony Ujah		(substituted off) 52'
LF	7	Ahmed Musa
Substitutions:
FW	8	Ideye Brown		(substituted on) 52'
MF	4	John Ugochukwu		(substituted on) 57'
DF	6	Azubuike Egwuekwe		(substituted on) 74'
Manager:
Stephen Keshi

Man of the Match:
Nnamdi Oduamadi (Nigeria)

Assistant referees:
William Torres (El Salvador)
Juan Zumba (El Salvador)
Fourth official:
Ravshan Irmatov (Uzbekistan)
Fifth official:
Abduxamidullo Rasulov (Uzbekistan)

==== Spain vs Tahiti ====
This game holds the record for the biggest margin of victory in a FIFA senior men's tournament. The previous record was nine goals which occurred three times: first when Hungary beat South Korea 9–0 at the 1954 FIFA World Cup; second when Yugoslavia defeated Zaire by the same score in 1974; and third when Hungary beat El Salvador 10–1 in 1982.

20 June 2013
16:00

Spain	10–0	Tahiti
Torres 5', 33', 57', 78'; Silva 31', 89'; Villa 39', 49', 64'; Mata 66'	Report

Estádio do Maracanã, Rio de Janeiro
Attendance: 71,806
Referee: Djamel Haimoudi (Algeria)

Spain	Tahiti

GK	23	Pepe Reina
RB	5	César Azpilicueta
CB	15	Sergio Ramos (c)		(substituted off) 46'
CB	2	Raúl Albiol
LB	19	Nacho Monreal
CM	20	Santi Cazorla	(yellow card) 45'	(substituted off) 76'
CM	4	Javi Martínez
CM	21	David Silva
RF	13	Juan Mata		(substituted off) 69'
CF	9	Fernando Torres
LF	7	David Villa
Substitutions:
MF	22	Jesús Navas		(substituted on) 46'
MF	10	Cesc Fàbregas		(substituted on) 69'
MF	6	Andrés Iniesta		(substituted on) 76'
Manager:
Vicente del Bosque

GK	1	Mickaël Roche
RB	16	Ricky Aitamai
CB	4	Teheivarii Ludivion
CB	10	Nicolas Vallar (c)
CB	17	Jonathan Tehau
LB	12	Edson Lemaire	(substituted off) 74'
CM	7	Heimano Bourebare	(substituted off) 69'
CM	6	Henri Caroine
RW	3	Marama Vahirua
LW	13	Steevy Chong Hue
CF	2	Alvin Tehau	(substituted off) 53'
Substitutions:
FW	9	Teaonui Tehau	(substituted on) 53'
MF	15	Lorenzo Tehau	(substituted on) 69'
DF	20	Yannick Vero	(substituted on) 74'
Manager:
Eddy Etaeta

Man of the Match:
Fernando Torres (Spain)

Assistant referees:
Redouane Achik (Morocco)
Abdelhak Etchiali (Algeria)
Fourth official:
Felix Brych (Germany)
Fifth official:
Stefan Lupp (Germany)

==== Uruguay vs Tahiti ====
23 June 2013
16:00

Uruguay	8–0	Tahiti
Hernández 2', 24', 45+1', 67' (pen.); Pérez 27'; Lodeiro 61'; Suárez 82', 90'	Report

Itaipava Arena Pernambuco, Recife
Attendance: 22,047
Referee: Pedro Proença (Portugal)

Uruguay	Tahiti

GK	23	Martín Silva
RB	13	Matías Aguirregaray
CB	4	Sebastián Coates
LB	19	Andrés Scotti	(yellow card) 42' (yellow-red card) 51'
DM	5	Walter Gargano
DM	15	Diego Pérez (c)	(yellow card) 84'
RM	8	Sebastián Eguren
LM	6	Álvaro Pereira
AM	14	Nicolás Lodeiro
AM	18	Gastón Ramírez		(substituted off) 69'
CF	11	Abel Hernández
Substitutions:
FW	9	Luis Suárez		(substituted on) 69'
Manager:
Óscar Tabárez

GK	22	Gilbert Meriel
RB	19	Vincent Simon
CB	17	Jonathan Tehau
CB	10	Nicolas Vallar (c)	(yellow card) 49'
CB	4	Teheivarii Ludivion	(yellow card) 8' (yellow-red card) 59'
LB	16	Ricky Aitamai		(substituted off) 53'
CM	3	Marama Vahirua
CM	21	Samuel Hnanyine		(substituted off) 87'
RW	6	Henri Caroine
LW	13	Steevy Chong Hue	(yellow card) 66'
CF	15	Lorenzo Tehau		(substituted off) 71'
Substitutions:
DF	12	Edson Lemaire		(substituted on) 53'
MF	11	Stanley Atani		(substituted on) 71'
MF	18	Yohann Tihoni		(substituted on) 87'
Manager:
Eddy Etaeta

Man of the Match:
Abel Hernández (Uruguay)

Assistant referees:
Bertino Miranda (Portugal)
José Trigo (Portugal)
Fourth official:
Djamel Haimoudi (Algeria)
Fifth official:
Abdelhak Etchiali (Algeria)

== Goalscorers ==
Goals	Player	Year
1	Jonathan Tehau	2012

== See also ==
- Tahiti at the OFC Nations Cup
