= 2013 FIFA Confederations Cup squads =

The following is a list of squads for each nation who competed at the 2013 FIFA Confederations Cup in Brazil from 15 to 30 June 2013, as a prelude to the 2014 FIFA World Cup. Each squad consisted of 23 players, three of which had to be goalkeepers. Replacement of injured players was permitted until 24 hours before the team's game. Players marked (c) were named as captain for their national team.

== Group A ==
=== Brazil ===
Head coach: Luiz Felipe Scolari

Scolari named his 23-man squad on 14 May 2013.

On 7 June, Leandro Damião withdrew from the squad with a thigh injury and was replaced by Jô.

No.	Pos.	Player	Date of birth (age)	Caps	Goals	Club
1	GK	Jefferson	2 January 1983 (aged 30)	7	0	(Brazilian Football Confederation) Botafogo
2	DF	Dani Alves	6 May 1983 (aged 30)	64	5	(Royal Spanish Football Federation) Barcelona
3	DF	Thiago Silva (c)	22 September 1984 (aged 28)	34	1	(French Football Federation) Paris Saint-Germain
4	DF	David Luiz	22 April 1987 (aged 26)	23	0	(The Football Association) Chelsea
5	MF	Fernando	3 March 1992 (aged 21)	6	0	(Brazilian Football Confederation) Grêmio (Note: Fernando joined Shakhtar Donetsk after the tournament.)
6	DF	Marcelo	12 May 1988 (aged 25)	20	4	(Royal Spanish Football Federation) Real Madrid
7	MF	Lucas Moura	13 August 1992 (aged 20)	25	4	(French Football Federation) Paris Saint-Germain
8	MF	Hernanes	29 May 1985 (aged 28)	12	2	(Italian Football Federation) Lazio
9	FW	Fred	3 October 1983 (aged 29)	24	11	(Brazilian Football Confederation) Fluminense
10	FW	Neymar	5 February 1992 (aged 21)	34	20	(Brazilian Football Confederation) Santos (Note: Neymar joined Barcelona after the tournament.)
11	MF	Oscar	9 September 1991 (aged 21)	17	6	(The Football Association) Chelsea
12	GK	Júlio César	3 September 1979 (aged 33)	69	0	(The Football Association) Queens Park Rangers
13	DF	Dante	18 October 1983 (aged 29)	3	0	(German Football Association) Bayern Munich
14	DF	Filipe Luís	9 August 1985 (aged 27)	4	0	(Royal Spanish Football Federation) Atlético Madrid
15	MF	Jean	24 June 1986 (aged 26)	5	0	(Brazilian Football Confederation) Fluminense
16	DF	Réver	4 January 1985 (aged 28)	8	1	(Brazilian Football Confederation) Atlético Mineiro
17	MF	Luiz Gustavo	23 July 1987 (aged 25)	5	0	(German Football Association) Bayern Munich
18	MF	Paulinho	25 July 1988 (aged 24)	13	3	(Brazilian Football Confederation) Corinthians
19	FW	Hulk	25 July 1986 (aged 26)	22	7	(Russian Football Union) Zenit Saint Petersburg
20	MF	Bernard	8 September 1992 (aged 20)	3	0	(Brazilian Football Confederation) Atlético Mineiro
21	FW	Jô	20 March 1987 (aged 26)	4	0	(Brazilian Football Confederation) Atlético Mineiro
22	GK	Diego Cavalieri	1 December 1982 (aged 30)	2	0	(Brazilian Football Confederation) Fluminense
23	MF	Jádson	5 October 1983 (aged 29)	7	1	(Brazilian Football Confederation) São Paulo

=== Japan ===
Head coach: (Italy) Alberto Zaccheroni

Zaccheroni announced his 23-man squad on 5 June 2013.

No.	Pos.	Player	Date of birth (age)	Caps	Goals	Club
1	GK	Eiji Kawashima	20 March 1983 (aged 30)	45	0	(Royal Belgian Football Association) Standard Liège
2	DF	Masahiko Inoha	28 August 1985 (aged 27)	19	1	(Japan Football Association) Júbilo Iwata
3	DF	Gōtoku Sakai	14 March 1991 (aged 22)	5	0	(German Football Association) VfB Stuttgart
4	MF	Keisuke Honda	13 June 1986 (aged 27)	42	14	(Russian Football Union) CSKA Moscow
5	DF	Yuto Nagatomo	12 September 1986 (aged 26)	58	3	(Italian Football Federation) Internazionale
6	DF	Atsuto Uchida	27 March 1988 (aged 25)	57	1	(German Football Association) Schalke 04
7	MF	Yasuhito Endō	28 January 1980 (aged 33)	130	10	(Japan Football Association) Gamba Osaka
8	FW	Hiroshi Kiyotake	12 November 1989 (aged 23)	17	1	(German Football Association) 1. FC Nürnberg
9	FW	Shinji Okazaki	16 April 1986 (aged 27)	63	33	(German Football Association) VfB Stuttgart
10	FW	Shinji Kagawa	17 March 1989 (aged 24)	43	13	(The Football Association) Manchester United
11	FW	Mike Havenaar	20 May 1987 (aged 26)	14	4	(Royal Dutch Football Association) Vitesse
12	GK	Shusaku Nishikawa	18 June 1986 (aged 26)	8	0	(Japan Football Association) Sanfrecce Hiroshima
13	MF	Hajime Hosogai	10 June 1986 (aged 27)	21	1	(German Football Association) Bayer Leverkusen
14	MF	Kengo Nakamura	31 October 1980 (aged 32)	66	6	(Japan Football Association) Kawasaki Frontale
15	DF	Yasuyuki Konno	25 January 1983 (aged 30)	68	1	(Japan Football Association) Gamba Osaka
16	DF	Yuzo Kurihara	18 September 1983 (aged 29)	16	2	(Japan Football Association) Yokohama F. Marinos
17	MF	Makoto Hasebe (c)	18 January 1984 (aged 29)	68	2	(German Football Association) VfL Wolfsburg
18	FW	Ryoichi Maeda	9 October 1981 (aged 31)	30	10	(Japan Football Association) Júbilo Iwata
19	FW	Takashi Inui	2 June 1988 (aged 25)	10	0	(German Football Association) Eintracht Frankfurt
20	MF	Hideto Takahashi	17 October 1987 (aged 25)	5	0	(Japan Football Association) FC Tokyo
21	DF	Hiroki Sakai	12 April 1990 (aged 23)	10	0	(German Football Association) Hannover 96
22	DF	Maya Yoshida	24 August 1988 (aged 24)	27	2	(The Football Association) Southampton
23	GK	Shūichi Gonda	3 March 1989 (aged 24)	1	0	(Japan Football Association) FC Tokyo

=== Mexico ===
Head coach: José Manuel de la Torre

De la Torre named his 23-man squad on 20 May 2013.

No.	Pos.	Player	Date of birth (age)	Caps	Goals	Club
1	GK	Guillermo Ochoa	13 July 1985 (aged 27)	52	0	(French Football Federation) Ajaccio
2	DF	Francisco Rodríguez (c)	20 October 1981 (aged 31)	80	1	(Mexican Football Federation) América
3	DF	Carlos Salcido	2 April 1980 (aged 33)	113	10	(Mexican Football Federation) UANL
4	DF	Diego Reyes	19 September 1992 (aged 20)	5	0	(Mexican Football Federation) América (Note: Diego Reyes joined Porto after the tournament.)
5	MF	Jesús Molina	29 March 1988 (aged 25)	7	0	(Mexican Football Federation) América
6	MF	Gerardo Torrado	30 April 1979 (aged 34)	139	6	(Mexican Football Federation) Cruz Azul
7	MF	Pablo Barrera	21 June 1987 (aged 25)	53	6	(Mexican Football Federation) Cruz Azul
8	MF	Ángel Reyna	19 September 1984 (aged 28)	21	1	(Mexican Football Federation) Pachuca
9	FW	Aldo de Nigris	22 July 1983 (aged 29)	22	9	(Mexican Football Federation) Monterrey (Note: Aldo de Nigris joined Guadalajara after the tournament.)
10	FW	Giovani dos Santos	11 May 1989 (aged 24)	62	14	(Royal Spanish Football Federation) Mallorca
11	MF	Javier Aquino	11 February 1990 (aged 23)	15	0	(Royal Spanish Football Federation) Villarreal
12	GK	Jesús Corona	26 January 1981 (aged 32)	23	0	(Mexican Football Federation) Cruz Azul
13	DF	Severo Meza	9 July 1986 (aged 26)	12	0	(Mexican Football Federation) Monterrey
14	FW	Javier Hernández	1 June 1988 (aged 25)	47	32	(The Football Association) Manchester United
15	DF	Héctor Moreno	17 January 1988 (aged 25)	41	1	(Royal Spanish Football Federation) Espanyol
16	MF	Héctor Herrera	19 April 1990 (aged 23)	6	0	(Mexican Football Federation) Pachuca
17	MF	Jesús Zavala	21 July 1987 (aged 25)	19	2	(Mexican Football Federation) Monterrey
18	MF	Andrés Guardado	28 September 1986 (aged 26)	91	14	(Royal Spanish Football Federation) Valencia
19	FW	Raúl Jiménez	5 May 1991 (aged 22)	5	0	(Mexican Football Federation) América
20	DF	Jorge Torres Nilo	16 January 1988 (aged 25)	32	1	(Mexican Football Federation) UANL
21	DF	Hiram Mier	25 August 1989 (aged 23)	5	0	(Mexican Football Federation) Monterrey
22	DF	Gerardo Flores	5 February 1986 (aged 27)	5	0	(Mexican Football Federation) Cruz Azul
23	GK	Alfredo Talavera	18 September 1982 (aged 30)	11	0	(Mexican Football Federation) Toluca

=== Italy ===
Head coach: Cesare Prandelli

Prandelli named his 23-man squad on 3 June 2013.

No.	Pos.	Player	Date of birth (age)	Caps	Goals	Club
1	GK	Gianluigi Buffon (c)	28 January 1978 (aged 35)	128	0	(Italian Football Federation) Juventus
2	DF	Christian Maggio	11 February 1982 (aged 31)	24	0	(Italian Football Federation) Napoli
3	DF	Giorgio Chiellini	14 August 1984 (aged 28)	57	2	(Italian Football Federation) Juventus
4	DF	Davide Astori	7 January 1987 (aged 26)	3	0	(Italian Football Federation) Cagliari
5	DF	Mattia De Sciglio	20 October 1992 (aged 20)	3	0	(Italian Football Federation) Milan
6	MF	Antonio Candreva	28 February 1987 (aged 26)	7	0	(Italian Football Federation) Lazio
7	MF	Alberto Aquilani	7 July 1984 (aged 28)	23	4	(Italian Football Federation) Fiorentina
8	MF	Claudio Marchisio	19 January 1986 (aged 27)	32	1	(Italian Football Federation) Juventus
9	FW	Mario Balotelli	12 August 1990 (aged 22)	20	8	(Italian Football Federation) Milan
10	FW	Sebastian Giovinco	26 January 1987 (aged 26)	14	0	(Italian Football Federation) Juventus
11	FW	Alberto Gilardino	5 July 1982 (aged 30)	51	18	(Italian Football Federation) Bologna
12	GK	Salvatore Sirigu	12 January 1987 (aged 26)	5	0	(French Football Federation) Paris Saint-Germain
13	GK	Federico Marchetti	7 February 1983 (aged 30)	8	0	(Italian Football Federation) Lazio
14	FW	Stephan El Shaarawy	27 October 1992 (aged 20)	6	1	(Italian Football Federation) Milan
15	DF	Andrea Barzagli	8 May 1981 (aged 32)	41	0	(Italian Football Federation) Juventus
16	MF	Daniele De Rossi	24 July 1983 (aged 29)	84	14	(Italian Football Federation) Roma
17	FW	Alessio Cerci	23 July 1987 (aged 25)	3	0	(Italian Football Federation) Torino
18	MF	Riccardo Montolivo	18 January 1985 (aged 28)	43	2	(Italian Football Federation) Milan
19	DF	Leonardo Bonucci	1 May 1987 (aged 26)	26	2	(Italian Football Federation) Juventus
20	DF	Ignazio Abate	12 November 1986 (aged 26)	10	0	(Italian Football Federation) Milan
21	MF	Andrea Pirlo	19 May 1979 (aged 34)	98	12	(Italian Football Federation) Juventus
22	MF	Emanuele Giaccherini	5 May 1985 (aged 28)	8	0	(Italian Football Federation) Juventus
23	MF	Alessandro Diamanti	2 May 1983 (aged 30)	11	0	(Italian Football Federation) Bologna

== Group B ==
=== Spain ===
Head coach: Vicente del Bosque

Del Bosque named his 23-man squad on 2 June 2013.

No.	Pos.	Player	Date of birth (age)	Caps	Goals	Club
1	GK	Iker Casillas (c)	20 May 1981 (aged 32)	145	0	(Royal Spanish Football Federation) Real Madrid
2	DF	Raúl Albiol	4 September 1985 (aged 27)	39	0	(Royal Spanish Football Federation) Real Madrid
3	DF	Gerard Piqué	2 February 1987 (aged 26)	51	4	(Royal Spanish Football Federation) Barcelona
4	MF	Javi Martínez	2 September 1988 (aged 24)	9	0	(German Football Association) Bayern Munich
5	DF	César Azpilicueta	28 August 1989 (aged 23)	2	0	(The Football Association) Chelsea
6	MF	Andrés Iniesta	11 May 1984 (aged 29)	80	11	(Royal Spanish Football Federation) Barcelona
7	FW	David Villa	3 December 1981 (aged 31)	88	53	(Royal Spanish Football Federation) Barcelona
8	MF	Xavi	25 January 1980 (aged 33)	120	12	(Royal Spanish Football Federation) Barcelona
9	FW	Fernando Torres	20 March 1984 (aged 29)	101	31	(The Football Association) Chelsea
10	MF	Cesc Fàbregas	4 May 1987 (aged 26)	79	13	(Royal Spanish Football Federation) Barcelona
11	FW	Pedro	28 July 1987 (aged 25)	26	12	(Royal Spanish Football Federation) Barcelona
12	GK	Víctor Valdés	14 January 1982 (aged 31)	13	0	(Royal Spanish Football Federation) Barcelona
13	MF	Juan Mata	28 April 1988 (aged 25)	25	7	(The Football Association) Chelsea
14	FW	Roberto Soldado	27 May 1985 (aged 28)	8	4	(Royal Spanish Football Federation) Valencia
15	DF	Sergio Ramos	30 March 1986 (aged 27)	102	9	(Royal Spanish Football Federation) Real Madrid
16	MF	Sergio Busquets	16 July 1988 (aged 24)	54	0	(Royal Spanish Football Federation) Barcelona
17	DF	Álvaro Arbeloa	17 January 1983 (aged 30)	47	0	(Royal Spanish Football Federation) Real Madrid
18	DF	Jordi Alba	21 March 1989 (aged 24)	17	2	(Royal Spanish Football Federation) Barcelona
19	DF	Nacho Monreal	26 February 1986 (aged 27)	12	0	(The Football Association) Arsenal
20	MF	Santi Cazorla	13 December 1984 (aged 28)	53	9	(The Football Association) Arsenal
21	MF	David Silva	8 January 1986 (aged 27)	70	18	(The Football Association) Manchester City
22	MF	Jesús Navas	21 November 1985 (aged 27)	23	2	(Royal Spanish Football Federation) Sevilla (Note: Jesús Navas joined Manchester City after the tournament.)
23	GK	Pepe Reina	31 August 1982 (aged 30)	26	0	(The Football Association) Liverpool

=== Uruguay ===
Head coach: Óscar Tabárez

Tabárez named his 23-man squad on 4 June 2013.

No.	Pos.	Player	Date of birth (age)	Caps	Goals	Club
1	GK	Fernando Muslera	16 June 1986 (aged 26)	44	0	(Turkish Football Federation) Galatasaray
2	DF	Diego Lugano (c)	2 November 1980 (aged 32)	79	8	(Royal Spanish Football Federation) Málaga
3	DF	Diego Godín	16 February 1986 (aged 27)	64	3	(Royal Spanish Football Federation) Atlético Madrid
4	DF	Sebastián Coates	7 October 1990 (aged 22)	9	1	(The Football Association) Liverpool
5	MF	Walter Gargano	27 July 1984 (aged 28)	50	1	(Italian Football Federation) Internazionale
6	MF	Álvaro Pereira	28 November 1985 (aged 27)	47	5	(Italian Football Federation) Internazionale
7	MF	Cristian Rodríguez	30 September 1985 (aged 27)	57	6	(Royal Spanish Football Federation) Atlético Madrid
8	MF	Sebastián Eguren	8 January 1981 (aged 32)	50	7	(Paraguayan Football Association) Libertad
9	FW	Luis Suárez	24 January 1987 (aged 26)	63	31	(The Football Association) Liverpool
10	FW	Diego Forlán	19 May 1979 (aged 34)	96	33	(Brazilian Football Confederation) Internacional
11	FW	Abel Hernández	8 August 1990 (aged 22)	8	3	(Italian Football Federation) Palermo
12	GK	Juan Castillo	17 April 1978 (aged 35)	13	0	(Uruguayan Football Association) Danubio
13	DF	Matías Aguirregaray	1 April 1989 (aged 24)	3	0	(Uruguayan Football Association) Peñarol
14	MF	Nicolás Lodeiro	21 March 1989 (aged 24)	17	1	(Brazilian Football Confederation) Botafogo
15	MF	Diego Pérez	18 May 1980 (aged 33)	82	1	(Italian Football Federation) Bologna
16	DF	Maxi Pereira	8 June 1984 (aged 29)	74	2	(Portuguese Football Federation) Benfica
17	MF	Egidio Arévalo Ríos	27 September 1982 (aged 30)	42	0	(Italian Football Federation) Palermo
18	FW	Gastón Ramírez	2 December 1990 (aged 22)	16	0	(The Football Association) Southampton
19	DF	Andrés Scotti	14 December 1975 (aged 37)	37	1	(Uruguayan Football Association) Nacional
20	MF	Álvaro González	29 October 1984 (aged 28)	33	1	(Italian Football Federation) Lazio
21	FW	Edinson Cavani	14 February 1987 (aged 26)	48	13	(Italian Football Federation) Napoli
22	DF	Martín Cáceres	7 April 1987 (aged 26)	45	1	(Italian Football Federation) Juventus
23	GK	Martín Silva	25 March 1983 (aged 30)	1	0	(Paraguayan Football Association) Olimpia

=== Tahiti ===
Head coach: Eddy Etaeta

Etaeta named his 23-man squad on 24 May 2013.

No.	Pos.	Player	Date of birth (age)	Caps	Goals	Club
1	GK	Mikaël Roche	24 December 1982 (aged 30)	6	0	(Tahitian Football Federation) AS Dragon
2	FW	Alvin Tehau	10 April 1989 (aged 24)	16	6	(Tahitian Football Federation) AS Tefana
3	FW	Marama Vahirua	12 May 1980 (aged 33)	0	0	(French Football Federation) Nancy (Note: Marama Vahirua was on loan at Panthrakikos.)
4	DF	Teheivarii Ludivion	1 July 1989 (aged 23)	15	1	(Tahitian Football Federation) AS Tefana
5	DF	Tamatoa Wagemann	18 March 1980 (aged 33)	6	0	(Tahitian Football Federation) AS Dragon
6	MF	Henri Caroine	7 September 1981 (aged 31)	6	0	(Tahitian Football Federation) AS Dragon
7	MF	Heimano Bourebare	15 May 1989 (aged 24)	12	1	(Tahitian Football Federation) AS Tefana
8	DF	Stephane Faatiarau	13 March 1990 (aged 23)	11	1	(Tahitian Football Federation) AS Tefana
9	FW	Teaonui Tehau	1 September 1992 (aged 20)	16	8	(Tahitian Football Federation) AS Dragon
10	DF	Nicolas Vallar (c)	22 October 1983 (aged 29)	12	3	(Tahitian Football Federation) AS Dragon
11	FW	Stanley Atani	27 January 1990 (aged 23)	15	5	(Tahitian Football Federation) AS Tefana
12	DF	Edson Lemaire	31 October 1990 (aged 22)	3	0	(Tahitian Football Federation) AS Dragon
13	FW	Steevy Chong Hue	26 January 1990 (aged 23)	19	7	(Tahitian Football Federation) AS Dragon
14	MF	Rainui Aroita	25 January 1994 (aged 19)	1	0	(Tahitian Football Federation) AS Tamarii Faa'a
15	MF	Lorenzo Tehau	10 April 1989 (aged 24)	18	7	(Tahitian Football Federation) AS Tefana
16	FW	Ricky Aitamai	22 December 1991 (aged 21)	1	0	(Tahitian Football Federation) AS Vénus
17	MF	Jonathan Tehau	9 January 1988 (aged 25)	22	4	(Tahitian Football Federation) AS Tamarii Faa'a
18	MF	Yohann Tihoni	20 July 1994 (aged 18)	1	0	(Tahitian Football Federation) AS Roniu
19	DF	Vincent Simon	28 September 1983 (aged 29)	21	1	(Tahitian Football Federation) AS Dragon
20	DF	Yannick Vero	28 February 1990 (aged 23)	5	0	(Tahitian Football Federation) AS Dragon
21	FW	Samuel Hnanyine	1 March 1984 (aged 29)	1	1	(Tahitian Football Federation) AS Dragon
22	GK	Gilbert Meriel	11 November 1986 (aged 26)	3	0	(Tahitian Football Federation) AS Tefana
23	GK	Xavier Samin	1 January 1978 (aged 35)	28	0	(Tahitian Football Federation) AS Dragon

=== Nigeria ===
Head coach: Stephen Keshi

Keshi named his 23-man squad on 7 June 2013.

No.	Pos.	Player	Date of birth (age)	Caps	Goals	Club
1	GK	Vincent Enyeama (c)	29 August 1982 (aged 30)	78	0	(Israel Football Association) Maccabi Tel Aviv
2	DF	Godfrey Oboabona	16 August 1990 (aged 22)	19	0	(Nigeria Football Federation) Sunshine Stars
3	DF	Elderson Echiéjilé	20 January 1988 (aged 25)	27	1	(Portuguese Football Federation) Braga
4	MF	John Ogu	20 April 1988 (aged 25)	2	0	(Portuguese Football Federation) Académica de Coimbra
5	DF	Efe Ambrose	18 October 1988 (aged 24)	22	1	(Scottish Football Association) Celtic
6	DF	Azubuike Egwuekwe	28 November 1988 (aged 24)	12	0	(Nigeria Football Federation) Warri Wolves
7	FW	Ahmed Musa	14 October 1992 (aged 20)	26	4	(Russian Football Union) CSKA Moscow
8	FW	Brown Ideye	10 October 1988 (aged 24)	14	2	(Ukrainian Association of Football) Dynamo Kyiv
9	FW	Joseph Akpala	24 August 1986 (aged 26)	5	1	(German Football Association) Werder Bremen
10	MF	Mikel John Obi	22 April 1987 (aged 26)	46	3	(The Football Association) Chelsea
11	FW	Mohammed Gambo	10 March 1988 (aged 25)	0	0	(Nigeria Football Federation) Kano Pillars
12	DF	Solomon Kwambe	30 September 1993 (aged 19)	3	0	(Nigeria Football Federation) Sunshine Stars
13	MF	Fegor Ogude	29 July 1987 (aged 25)	11	0	(Norwegian Football Federation) Vålerenga
14	FW	Anthony Ujah	14 October 1990 (aged 22)	1	0	(German Football Association) 1. FC Köln
15	MF	Michael Babatunde	24 December 1992 (aged 20)	1	0	(Ukrainian Association of Football) Kryvbas
16	GK	Austin Ejide	8 April 1984 (aged 29)	24	0	(Israel Football Association) Hapoel Be'er Sheva
17	MF	Ogenyi Onazi	25 December 1992 (aged 20)	9	1	(Italian Football Federation) Lazio
18	MF	Emeka Eze	22 December 1992 (aged 20)	1	0	(Nigeria Football Federation) Enugu Rangers
19	MF	Sunday Mba	28 November 1988 (aged 24)	11	5	(Nigeria Football Federation) Enugu Rangers
20	FW	Nnamdi Oduamadi	17 October 1990 (aged 22)	3	1	(Italian Football Federation) Varese
21	DF	Francis Benjamin	20 June 1993 (aged 19)	1	0	(Nigeria Football Federation) Heartland
22	DF	Kenneth Omeruo	17 October 1993 (aged 19)	8	0	(Royal Dutch Football Association) ADO Den Haag
23	GK	Chigozie Agbim	28 November 1984 (aged 28)	5	0	(Nigeria Football Federation) Enugu Rangers

== Player representation ==
=== By club nationality ===
Players	Countries
35	Italy
25	Spain
22	(French Polynesia) Tahiti
19	England
17	Mexico
13	Germany
12	Brazil
9	Japan
8	Nigeria
5	France
3	Portugal, Russia, Uruguay
2	Israel, Netherlands, Paraguay, Ukraine
1	Belgium, Norway, Turkey, Scotland

Nations in italics are not represented by their national teams in the finals.

=== By representatives of domestic league ===
National Squad	No.
Brazil	10
Italy	22
Japan	9
Mexico	17
Nigeria	8
Spain	15
Tahiti	22
Uruguay	3
