= 2013 FIFA Confederations Cup Group B =

Football tournament group stage

Group B of the 2013 FIFA Confederations Cup took place from 16 to 23 June 2013 in Belo Horizonte's Mineirão, Fortaleza's Castelão, Recife's Arena Pernambuco, Rio de Janeiro's, Maracanã and Salvador's Arena Fonte Nova. The group consisted of Nigeria, Spain, Tahiti, and Uruguay.

== Standings ==
Pos	Team	Pld	W	D	L	GF	GA	GD	Pts	Qualification
1	Spain	3	3	0	0	15	1	+14	9	Advance to knockout stage
2	Uruguay	3	2	0	1	11	3	+8	6	Advance to knockout stage
3	Nigeria	3	1	0	2	7	6	+1	3	
4	Tahiti	3	0	0	3	1	24	−23	0	

Source: FIFA

In the semi-finals:

- The winners of Group B, Spain, advanced to play the runners-up of Group A, Italy.
- The runners-up of Group B, Uruguay, advanced to play the winners of Group A, Brazil.

== Matches ==
=== Spain vs Uruguay ===
16 June 2013
19:00

Spain	2–1	Uruguay
Pedro 20'; Soldado 32'	Report	Suárez 88'

Itaipava Arena Pernambuco, Recife
Attendance: 41,705
Referee: Yuichi Nishimura (Japan)

Spain	Uruguay

GK	1	Iker Casillas (c)
RB	17	Álvaro Arbeloa	(yellow card) 71'
CB	15	Sergio Ramos
CB	3	Gerard Piqué	(yellow card) 36'
LB	18	Jordi Alba
DM	16	Sergio Busquets
CM	8	Xavi		(substituted off) 77'
CM	6	Andrés Iniesta
RW	11	Pedro		(substituted off) 81'
LW	10	Cesc Fàbregas		(substituted off) 65'
CF	14	Roberto Soldado
Substitutions:
MF	20	Santi Cazorla		(substituted on) 65'
MF	4	Javi Martínez		(substituted on) 77'
MF	13	Juan Mata		(substituted on) 81'
Manager:
Vicente del Bosque

GK	1	Fernando Muslera
RB	16	Maxi Pereira
CB	2	Diego Lugano (c)	(yellow card) 41'
CB	3	Diego Godín
LB	22	Martín Cáceres
CM	5	Walter Gargano		(substituted off) 63'
CM	15	Diego Pérez		(substituted off) 69'
RW	18	Gastón Ramírez		(substituted off) 46'
LW	7	Cristian Rodríguez
CF	9	Luis Suárez
CF	21	Edinson Cavani	(yellow card) 27'
Substitutions:
MF	20	Álvaro González		(substituted on) 46'
MF	14	Nicolás Lodeiro		(substituted on) 63'
FW	10	Diego Forlán		(substituted on) 69'
Manager:
Óscar Tabárez

Man of the Match:
Andrés Iniesta (Spain)

Assistant referees:
Toru Sagara (Japan)
Toshiyuki Nagi (Japan)
Fourth official:
Björn Kuipers (Netherlands)
Fifth official:
Sander van Roekel (Netherlands)

=== Tahiti vs Nigeria ===
17 June 2013
19:00

Tahiti	1–6	Nigeria
J. Tehau 54'	Report	Vallar 5' (o.g.); Oduamadi 10', 26', 76'; J. Tehau 69' (o.g.); Echiéjilé 80'

Estádio Mineirão, Belo Horizonte
Attendance: 20,187
Referee: Joel Aguilar (El Salvador)

Tahiti	Nigeria

GK	23	Xavier Samin
CB	4	Teheivarii Ludivion
CB	10	Nicolas Vallar (c)	(substituted off) 54'
CB	17	Jonathan Tehau
RM	19	Vincent Simon	(substituted off) 78'
CM	7	Heimano Bourebare
CM	6	Henri Caroine
LM	16	Ricky Aitamai
RW	3	Marama Vahirua	(substituted off) 69'
LW	13	Steevy Chong Hue
CF	2	Alvin Tehau
Substitutions:
DF	8	Stephane Faatiarau	(substituted on) 54'
MF	11	Stanley Atani	(substituted on) 69'
DF	12	Edson Lemaire	(substituted on) 78'
Manager:
Eddy Etaeta

GK	1	Vincent Enyeama (c)
RB	5	Efe Ambrose
CB	2	Godfrey Oboabona
CB	22	Kenneth Omeruo	(yellow card) 41'	(substituted off) 74'
LB	3	Uwa Elderson Echiéjilé
RM	13	Fegor Ogude
CM	10	John Obi Mikel
LM	19	Sunday Mba		(substituted off) 57'
RF	20	Nnamdi Oduamadi
CF	14	Anthony Ujah		(substituted off) 52'
LF	7	Ahmed Musa
Substitutions:
FW	8	Ideye Brown		(substituted on) 52'
MF	4	John Ugochukwu		(substituted on) 57'
DF	6	Azubuike Egwuekwe		(substituted on) 74'
Manager:
Stephen Keshi

Man of the Match:
Nnamdi Oduamadi (Nigeria)

Assistant referees:
William Torres (El Salvador)
Juan Zumba (El Salvador)
Fourth official:
Ravshan Irmatov (Uzbekistan)
Fifth official:
Abduxamidullo Rasulov (Uzbekistan)

=== Spain vs Tahiti ===
20 June 2013
16:00

Spain	10–0	Tahiti
Torres 5', 33', 57', 78'; Silva 31', 89'; Villa 39', 49', 64'; Mata 66'	Report

Estádio do Maracanã, Rio de Janeiro
Attendance: 71,806
Referee: Djamel Haimoudi (Algeria)

This game holds the record for the biggest margin of victory in a FIFA senior men's tournament. The previous record was nine goals which occurred three times: first when Hungary beat South Korea 9–0 at the 1954 FIFA World Cup; second when Yugoslavia defeated Zaire by the same score in 1974; and third when Hungary beat El Salvador 10–1 in 1982.

Spain	Tahiti

GK	23	Pepe Reina
RB	5	César Azpilicueta
CB	15	Sergio Ramos (c)		(substituted off) 46'
CB	2	Raúl Albiol
LB	19	Nacho Monreal
CM	20	Santi Cazorla	(yellow card) 45'	(substituted off) 76'
CM	4	Javi Martínez
CM	21	David Silva
RF	13	Juan Mata		(substituted off) 69'
CF	9	Fernando Torres
LF	7	David Villa
Substitutions:
MF	22	Jesús Navas		(substituted on) 46'
MF	10	Cesc Fàbregas		(substituted on) 69'
MF	6	Andrés Iniesta		(substituted on) 76'
Manager:
Vicente del Bosque

GK	1	Mickaël Roche
RB	16	Ricky Aitamai
CB	4	Teheivarii Ludivion
CB	10	Nicolas Vallar (c)
CB	17	Jonathan Tehau
LB	12	Edson Lemaire	(substituted off) 74'
CM	7	Heimano Bourebare	(substituted off) 69'
CM	6	Henri Caroine
RW	3	Marama Vahirua
LW	13	Steevy Chong Hue
CF	2	Alvin Tehau	(substituted off) 53'
Substitutions:
FW	9	Teaonui Tehau	(substituted on) 53'
MF	15	Lorenzo Tehau	(substituted on) 69'
DF	20	Yannick Vero	(substituted on) 74'
Manager:
Eddy Etaeta

Man of the Match:
Fernando Torres (Spain)

Assistant referees:
Redouane Achik (Morocco)
Abdelhak Etchiali (Algeria)
Fourth official:
Felix Brych (Germany)
Fifth official:
Stefan Lupp (Germany)

=== Nigeria vs Uruguay ===
20 June 2013
19:00

Nigeria	1–2	Uruguay
Mikel 37'	Report	Lugano 19'; Forlán 51'

Itaipava Arena Fonte Nova, Salvador
Attendance: 26,769
Referee: Björn Kuipers (Netherlands)

Nigeria	Uruguay

GK	1	Vincent Enyeama (c)
RB	5	Efe Ambrose
CB	2	Godfrey Oboabona
CB	22	Kenneth Omeruo
LB	3	Uwa Elderson Echiéjilé
RM	4	John Ugochukwu		(substituted off) 66'
CM	10	John Obi Mikel
LM	13	Fegor Ogude
RF	20	Nnamdi Oduamadi		(substituted off) 45'
CF	8	Brown Ideye		(substituted off) 73'
LF	7	Ahmed Musa
Substitutions:
MF	15	Michel Babatunde	(yellow card) 60'	(substituted on) 45'
MF	19	Sunday Mba		(substituted on) 66'
FW	9	Joseph Akpala	(yellow card) 74'	(substituted on) 73'
Manager:
Stephen Keshi

GK	1	Fernando Muslera
CB	3	Diego Godín
CB	2	Diego Lugano (c)	(yellow card) 79'
CB	22	Martín Cáceres
RM	16	Maxi Pereira
CM	17	Egidio Arévalo
CM	20	Álvaro González
LM	7	Cristian Rodríguez		(substituted off) 88'
AM	10	Diego Forlán
CF	9	Luis Suárez		(substituted off) 83'
CF	21	Edinson Cavani
Substitutions:
DF	4	Sebastián Coates	(yellow card) 84'	(substituted on) 83'
MF	6	Álvaro Pereira		(substituted on) 88'
Manager:
Óscar Tabárez

Man of the Match:
Diego Forlán (Uruguay)

Assistant referees:
Sander van Roekel (Netherlands)
Erwin Zeinstra (Netherlands)
Fourth official:
Pedro Proença (Portugal)
Fifth official:
Bertino Miranda (Portugal)

=== Nigeria vs Spain ===
23 June 2013
16:00

Nigeria	0–3	Spain
	Report	Alba 3', 88'; Torres 62'

Estádio Castelão, Fortaleza
Attendance: 51,263
Referee: Joel Aguilar (El Salvador)

Nigeria	Spain

GK	1	Vincent Enyeama (c)
RB	5	Efe Ambrose
CB	2	Godfrey Oboabona
CB	22	Kenneth Omeruo	(substituted off) 12'
LB	3	Uwa Elderson Echiéjilé
RM	19	Sunday Mba	(substituted off) 63'
CM	10	John Obi Mikel
LM	13	Fegor Ogude
RF	9	Joseph Akpala	(substituted off) 71'
CF	8	Brown Ideye
LF	7	Ahmed Musa
Substitutions:
DF	6	Azubuike Egwuekwe	(substituted on) 12'
MF	4	John Ugochukwu	(substituted on) 63'
FW	11	Mohammed Gambo	(substituted on) 71'
Manager:
Stephen Keshi

GK	12	Víctor Valdés
RB	17	Álvaro Arbeloa
CB	3	Gerard Piqué
CB	15	Sergio Ramos
LB	18	Jordi Alba
DM	16	Sergio Busquets
CM	6	Andrés Iniesta
CM	8	Xavi (c)
RW	11	Pedro	(substituted off) 75'
LW	10	Cesc Fàbregas	(substituted off) 54'
CF	14	Roberto Soldado	(substituted off) 60'
Substitutions:
MF	21	David Silva	(substituted on) 54'
FW	9	Fernando Torres	(substituted on) 60'
FW	7	David Villa	(substituted on) 75'
Manager:
Vicente del Bosque

Man of the Match:
Jordi Alba (Spain)

Assistant referees:
William Torres (El Salvador)
Juan Zumba (El Salvador)
Fourth official:
Diego Abal (Argentina)
Fifth official:
Hernán Maidana (Argentina)

=== Uruguay vs Tahiti ===
23 June 2013
16:00

Uruguay	8–0	Tahiti
Hernández 2', 24', 45+1', 67' (pen.); Pérez 27'; Lodeiro 61'; Suárez 82', 90'	Report

Itaipava Arena Pernambuco, Recife
Attendance: 22,047
Referee: Pedro Proença (Portugal)

Uruguay	Tahiti

GK	23	Martín Silva
RB	13	Matías Aguirregaray
CB	4	Sebastián Coates
LB	19	Andrés Scotti	(yellow card) 42' (yellow-red card) 51'
DM	5	Walter Gargano
DM	15	Diego Pérez (c)	(yellow card) 84'
RM	8	Sebastián Eguren
LM	6	Álvaro Pereira
AM	14	Nicolás Lodeiro
AM	18	Gastón Ramírez		(substituted off) 69'
CF	11	Abel Hernández
Substitutions:
FW	9	Luis Suárez		(substituted on) 69'
Manager:
Óscar Tabárez

GK	22	Gilbert Meriel
RB	19	Vincent Simon
CB	17	Jonathan Tehau
CB	10	Nicolas Vallar (c)	(yellow card) 49'
CB	4	Teheivarii Ludivion	(yellow card) 8' (yellow-red card) 59'
LB	16	Ricky Aitamai		(substituted off) 53'
CM	3	Marama Vahirua
CM	21	Samuel Hnanyine		(substituted off) 87'
RW	6	Henri Caroine
LW	13	Steevy Chong Hue	(yellow card) 66'
CF	15	Lorenzo Tehau		(substituted off) 71'
Substitutions:
DF	12	Edson Lemaire		(substituted on) 53'
MF	11	Stanley Atani		(substituted on) 71'
MF	18	Yohann Tihoni		(substituted on) 87'
Manager:
Eddy Etaeta

Man of the Match:
Abel Hernández (Uruguay)

Assistant referees:
Bertino Miranda (Portugal)
José Trigo (Portugal)
Fourth official:
Djamel Haimoudi (Algeria)
Fifth official:
Abdelhak Etchiali (Algeria)
