= List of football clubs in French Polynesia =

The following is a list of association football clubs in French Polynesia.

- AS Central Sport
- AS Dragon
- AS Excelsior
- AS Fei Pi
- AS Maire Nui
- AS Manu-Ura
- AS Mataiea
- AS Mira
- AS Papenoo
- AS Pirae
- AS Pueu
- AS Roniu
- AS Samine
- AS Tamarii Faa'a
- AS Tefana
- AS Toanui
- AS Vaiete
- AS Vairao
- AS Vénus
