= 2013–14 Tahiti Ligue 1 =

Tahiti Ligue 1
- Season: 2013–14
- Champions: A.S. Pirae
- Relegated: Vairao, Olympic Mahina
- Matches: 75
- Goals: 358 (4.77 per match)
- Top goalscorer: (French Polynesia) Teaonui Tehau (25 goals)

The 2013–14 Tahiti Ligue 1 was the 67th season of the Tahiti Ligue 1 organized by the Tahitian Football Federation since its establishment in 1948.

== League table ==
Pos	Team	Pld	W	D	L	GF	GA	GD	Pts	Qualification or relegation
1	Pirae	9	8	0	1	37	11	+26	33	Qualified to the Championship Playoff
2	Tefana	9	8	0	1	50	10	+40	33	Qualified to the Championship Playoff
3	Manu-Ura	9	6	1	2	22	11	+11	28	Qualified to the Championship Playoff
4	Vénus	9	5	1	3	25	17	+8	25	Qualified to the Championship Playoff
5	Dragon	9	5	0	4	33	14	+19	24	Qualified to the Championship Playoff
6	Roniu	9	4	2	3	15	20	−5	23	Qualified to the Championship Playoff
7	Excelsior	9	2	2	5	12	21	−9	17	
8	Tamarii Faa'a	9	2	0	7	20	31	−11	15	
9	Vairao (R)	9	1	2	6	9	40	−31	14	Relegation to Tahiti Ligue 2
10	Olympic Mahina (R)	9	0	0	9	4	52	−48	9	Relegation to Tahiti Ligue 2

Updated to match(es) played on 14 December 2013. Source: RSSSF
Rules for classification: 1) points; 2) goal difference; 3) number of goals scored. 4 points for a win, 2 points for a draw, 1 point for a defeat.
(R) Relegated

== Championship playoff ==
Pos	Team	Pld	W	D	L	GF	GA	GD	Pts	Qualification
1	Pirae (C)	10	8	1	1	33	18	+15	37 (Note: 2 bonus points as winners regular stage)	Qualified to the 2014–15 OFC Champions League
2	Tefana	10	6	3	1	28	16	+12	31	
3	Vénus	10	4	2	4	21	19	+2	24	
4	Dragon	10	4	0	6	19	23	−4	22	
5	Manu-Ura	10	2	3	5	14	19	−5	19	
6	Roniu	10	1	1	8	16	36	−20	14	

Updated to match(es) played on 22 March 2014. Source: RSSSF
Rules for classification: 1) points; 2) goal difference; 3) number of goals scored. 4 points for a win, 2 points for a draw, 1 point for a defeat.
(C) Champions

== Top scorers ==
Rank	Player	Club	Goals
1	(French Polynesia) Teaonui Tehau	Vénus	25
2	(French Polynesia) Steevy Chong Hue	Tefana	24
3	(French Polynesia) Raimana Li Fung Kuee	Pirae	17
4	(French Polynesia) Naea Bennett	Pirae	16
5	(French Polynesia) Temarii Tinorua	Tefana	13
6	(French Polynesia) Alvin Tehau	Tefana	10
