= 2014–15 Tahiti Ligue 1 =

Tahiti Ligue 1
- Season: 2014–15
- Champions: A.S. Tefana
- Relegated: Excelsior, Tahiti Nui U17, Tamarii Faa'a
- Matches played: 75
- Goals scored: 339 (4.52 per match)
- Top goalscorer: (French Polynesia) Raimana Li Fung Kuee (30 goals)
- Biggest home win: Tefana 13-0 Excelsior
- Biggest away win: Tamarii Faa'a 0-16 Pirae

The 2014–15 Tahiti Ligue 1 was the 68th season of the Tahiti Ligue 1 organized by the Tahitian Football Federation since its establishment in 1948.

== League table ==
Pos	Team	Pld	W	D	L	GF	GA	GD	BP	Pts	Qualification or relegation
1	Tefana	9	9	0	0	49	3	+46	4	40	Qualified to the Championship Playoff
2	Pirae	9	5	2	2	57	19	+38	4	30	Qualified to the Championship Playoff
3	Dragon	9	4	3	2	36	17	+19	4	28	Qualified to the Championship Playoff
4	Manu-Ura	9	5	3	1	30	10	+20	0	27	Qualified to the Championship Playoff
5	Central Sport	9	4	2	3	23	20	+3	4	27	Qualified to the Championship Playoff
6	Roniu	9	4	1	4	21	28	−7	2	24	Qualified to the Championship Playoff
7	Vénus	9	4	3	2	28	20	+8	0	24	
8	Excelsior (R)	9	1	1	7	12	56	−44	2	15	Relegation to Tahiti Ligue 2
9	Tahiti Nui U-17 (R)	9	1	0	8	13	37	−24	0	12	Relegation to Tahiti Ligue 2
10	Tamarii Faa'a (R)	9	0	1	8	10	69	−59	2	12	Relegation to Tahiti Ligue 2

Updated to match(es) played on 23 November 2014. Source: RSSSF
Rules for classification: 1) points; 2) goal difference; 3) number of goals scored. 4 points for a win, 2 points for a draw, 1 point for a defeat.
(R) Relegated

== Championship playoff ==
Pos	Team	Pld	W	D	L	GF	GA	GD	BP	Pts	Qualification
1	Tefana (C)	10	8	1	1	43	14	+29	4	39	Qualified to the 2014–15 OFC Champions League
2	Pirae	10	8	1	1	45	12	+33	4	39	
3	Central Sport	10	5	0	5	23	28	−5	4	29	
4	Dragon	10	2	1	7	24	38	−14	4	21	
5	Manu-Ura	10	3	1	6	14	25	−11	0	20	
6	Roniu	10	1	2	7	14	46	−32	2	17	

Updated to match(es) played on 21 March 2015. Source: RSSSF
Rules for classification: 1) points; 2) goal difference; 3) number of goals scored. 4 points for a win, 2 points for a draw, 1 point for a defeat.
(C) Champions

== Hat-tricks ==
Player	For	Against	Score	Date
(French Polynesia) Yohann Tihoni	Rovnou	Tahiti U17	0-4	12 September 2014
(French Polynesia) Teaonui Tehau	Vénus	Central	3-7	13 September 2014
(French Polynesia) Roonui Tinirauari^{4}	Pirae	Excelsior	1-11	13 September 2014
(French Polynesia) Raimana Li Fung Kuee^{5}	Pirae	Excelsior	1-11	13 September 2014
(French Polynesia) Steevy Chong Hue^{5}	Tefana	Excelsior	13-0	13 October 2014
(French Polynesia) Temarii Tinorua	Tefana	Excelsior	13-0	13 October 2014
(French Polynesia) Mauarii Tehina	Vénus	Excelsior	6-1	3 November 2014
(French Polynesia) Gary Rochette^{4}	Manu Ura	Tamarii Faa'a	10-1	15 November 2014
(French Polynesia) Zacharie Ratinassamy	Dragon	Tamarii Faa'a	11-1	23 November 2014
(French Polynesia) Steevy Chong Hue	Tefana	Ronui	9-1	21 December 2014
