= A.S. Excelsior =

Tahitian association football club

AS Excelsior
- Full name: Association Sportive Excelsior Football
- Founded: 1940; 85 years ago
- Ground: Stade Mission; Papeete, Tahiti, French Polynesia
- Capacity: 1,000
- Chairman: Denise Yan
- League: Tahiti Ligue 2
- 2023–24: 4th
Home colours

Association Sportive Excelsior Football, is a sport club from Papeete, Tahiti. The club has football and tennis sections . The football team on several titles in the Tahitian football, mainly in the decades of 1950 and 1960. Today, they compete in the Tahiti Ligue 2 the second tier of the football system in Tahiti.

== Current squad ==
Squad for the 2019-20 Tahiti Ligue 2

Note: Flags indicate national team as defined under FIFA eligibility rules; some limited exceptions apply. Players may hold more than one non-FIFA nationality.

No.	Pos.	Nation	Player
1	GK	TAH	Tehei Roe
2	DF	TAH	Christophe Noa
3	DF	TAH	Heiarii Marii
4	MF	TAH	Marurai Tunoa
5	DF	TAH	Benjamin Pirato
6	MF	TAH	Lery Matai
7	DF	TAH	Tauriki Tahaia
8	MF	TAH	Tuahu Snow
9	FW	TAH	Leon Chan

No.	Pos.	Nation	Player
10	FW	TAH	Teikiukumoana Sam
11	FW	TAH	Teheura Tahi
12	DF	TAH	Glenn Garbutt
13	FW	TAH	Vincent Sanne
14	MF	TAH	Levyn Leau
16	DF	TAH	Lucas Larson
18	MF	TAH	Kehea Avaeoru
19	MF	TAH	Dean Leau

== Achievements ==
- Tahiti Ligue 1: 7

1952, 1956, 1957, 1959, 1960, 1986, 1988.

- Tahiti Cup: 4

1960, 1963, 1964, 1965.

=== Last seasons ===
Season	League/position
2012-13	2nd in Ligue 2 - Promoted. 1/8 Finals of Tahiti Cup.
2013-14	7th in Ligue 1.
2014-15	8th in Ligue 1 - Relegated. Semifinals of Tahiti Cup.
2015-16	9th in Ligue 2. Round 2 of Tahiti Cup.
2016-17	5th in Ligue 2 Round 1 of Tahiti Cup.
2017-18	6th in Ligue 2. Round 2 of Tahiti Cup.
2018-19	4th in Ligue 2. Round 1 of Tahiti Cup.
2019-20	1st in Ligue 2 - Promoted. Round 1 of Tahiti Cup.
