= Rainui Aroita =

Tahitian footballer (born 1994)

Personal information
- Full name: Rainui Aroita
- Date of birth: 25 January 1994 (age 32)
- Place of birth: Tahiti
- Height: 1.80 m (5 ft 11 in)
- Position: Defender

Youth career
- AS Arue

Senior career*
Years	Team	Apps	(Gls)
2011–	A.S. Tamarii Faa'a		

International career^{‡}
2011	Tahiti U17		
2013–	Tahiti	2	(0)
Medal record
Men's football
Representing Tahiti
OFC Nations Cup
Third place	2024 Fiji/Vanuatu
Pacific Games
Silver medal – second place	2015 Papua New Guinea
- * Club domestic league appearances and goals ‡ National team caps and goals as of 12 June 2016

Rainui Aroita (born 25 January 1994) is Tahitian footballer who plays for A.S. Tamarii Faa'a and for Tahiti national football team.

== Career ==
Airota started his career with AS Arue. He left in 2011 Arue and joined to Tahiti First Division club A.S. Tamarii Faa'a. In June 2013 he was called for a trial to Brazilian second division club América Futebol Clube (MG).

== International ==
He was part of the Tahiti squad at the 2013 FIFA Confederations Cup in Brazil. Airota played his full senior debut on 26 March 2013 against New Caledonia national football team in the Qualification for the FIFA World Cup 2014.

== Honours ==
Tahiti

- OFC Nations Cup: 3rd place, 2024

Tahiti U-23

- Pacific Games: Silver Medalist, 2015
