= Nicolás Lodeiro =

Uruguayan footballer (born 1989)

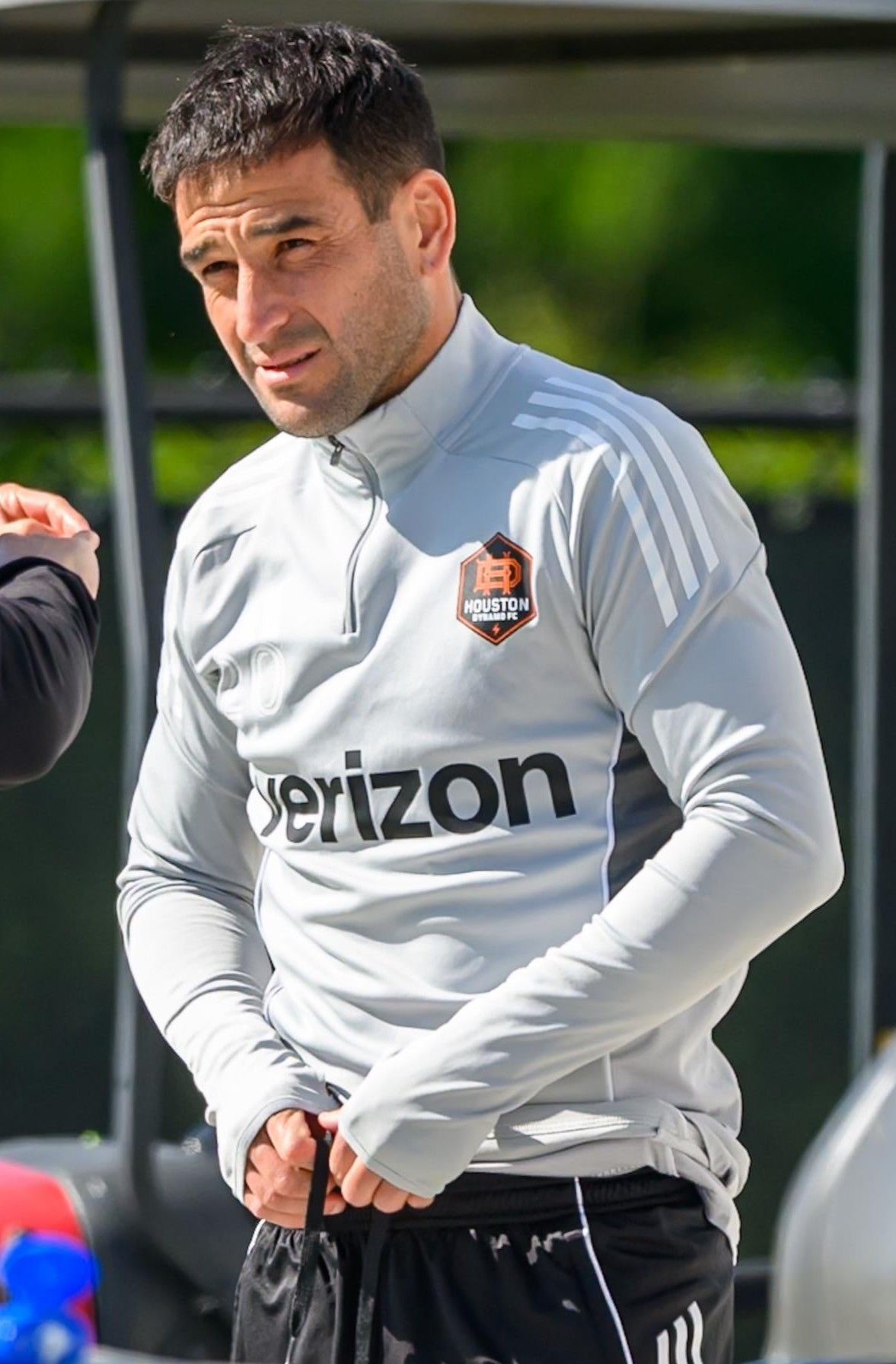
- Lodeiro with Houston Dynamo in 2025

Personal information
- Full name: Marcelo Nicolás Lodeiro Benítez
- Date of birth: 21 March 1989 (age 37)
- Place of birth: Paysandú, Uruguay
- Height: 1.74 m (5 ft 9 in)
- Position: Attacking midfielder

Youth career
- Barrio Obrero
- 2003–2007: Nacional

Senior career*
Years	Team	Apps	(Gls)
2007–2010	Nacional	43	(9)
2010–2012	Ajax	21	(2)
2012–2014	Botafogo	47	(7)
2014–2015	Corinthians	7	(0)
2015–2016	Boca Juniors	30	(6)
2016–2023	Seattle Sounders	191	(41)
2024–2025	Orlando City	34	(1)
2025	Houston Dynamo	16	(1)
2025–2026	Nacional	27	(0)
Total		416	(67)

International career
2008–2009	Uruguay U20	11	(5)
2012	Uruguay Olympic	3	(1)
2009–2019	Uruguay	60	(5)
Medal record
Representing Uruguay
Copa América
Winner	2011 Argentina
- * Club domestic league appearances and goals

Marcelo Nicolás Lodeiro Benítez (Spanish pronunciation: [nikoˈlas loˈðejɾo]; born 21 March 1989) is a Uruguayan former professional footballer who played as an attacking midfielder.

Lodeiro has played professionally in Uruguay, the Netherlands, Brazil, Argentina, and the United States, winning the Eredivisie in both of his seasons at Ajax, and winning the domestic double in 2015 with Boca Juniors. He also won titles with Nacional and Botafogo, as well as the 2016 and 2019 MLS Cup with Seattle Sounders, and the 2022 CONCACAF Champions League. In 2025, Lodeiro returned to Uruguay to play for his first professional club, Nacional, and retired a year later.

Lodeiro was called up the Uruguay national team in 2009 and earned 60 caps through to 2019. He took part in two FIFA World Cups with the national side, as well as four editions of the Copa América, the 2012 Summer Olympics, and the 2013 FIFA Confederations Cup, in which Uruguay finished fourth. He was also part of the teams which placed fourth in the 2010 FIFA World Cup and won the 2011 Copa América.

== Club career ==
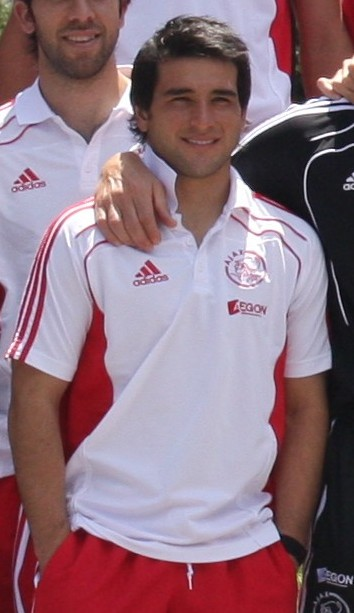
Lodeiro with Ajax in 2011

=== Early career ===
Lodeiro was born in 1989 in Paysandú, which borders Argentina. It was here that he made his first steps as a footballer in the youth sides of local club Barrio Obrero. It wasn't too long before his talent was recognised by a local scout called Daniel López who nurtured him to play for the youth team at Nacional Montevideo aged only 14 years old.

=== Nacional ===
Four years later, at the age of 18, Lodeiro made his debut for the Nacional first team against Fénix on 19 August 2007. Later on in the year he also scored his first senior goal and it was clear to see that in Lodeiro, there was a new star in the making.

A year later, Lodeiro continued to make progress, securing more playing time and even scored against River Plate in the Pre-Libertadores playoff. But 2009 was the year that Lodeiro really began to make progress. His three goals and several assists in the Copa Libertadores helped Nacional to reach the semi-finals of the tournament. In April 2009 he was named 58th highest scorer in the world by the IFFHS following his performance in the Copa Libertadores

Lodeiro played a vital role for Nacional in the 2008–09 Copa Libertadores, which saw Nacional reach the semi-finals. From then on, Lodeiro has been considered one of the best youth players in the country.

=== Ajax ===
In January 2010, Lodeiro signed a contract with Ajax until June 2012 with option of 2 more years. He joined his fellow Uruguayans Bruno Silva and his friend Luis Suárez at Ajax. His first appearance for Ajax was as a substitute in the match against FC Twente on 7 February 2010. He marked his first goal against Go Ahead Eagles with Ajax on 25 March in the KNVB Beker. Because of an injury he sustained during the World Cup he didn't play a single match for Ajax in the 2010/2011 Eredivisie season. He did however make 19 appearances for Ajax the following season, scoring twice in the regular season, and once against Dinamo Zagreb in the Champions League, all while helping Ajax to win their 31st league title.

=== Botafogo ===
On 20 July 2012 it was announced that Botafogo had signed Lodeiro to a four-year contract, taking the young midfielder over to Rio de Janeiro from Ajax for an undisclosed fee. He was a key part of the squad that won the Campeonato Carioca in 2013 and qualified Botafogo for the 2014 Copa Libertadores after 18 years absence of the tournament. During his time with Botafogo, Lodeiro was part of Uruguay's 2013 FIFA Confederations Cup and 2014 FIFA World Cup squad.

=== Corinthians ===
On 29 May 2014, Lodeiro signed a four-year deal with Corinthians, for a R$4.5 million fee.

=== Boca Juniors ===
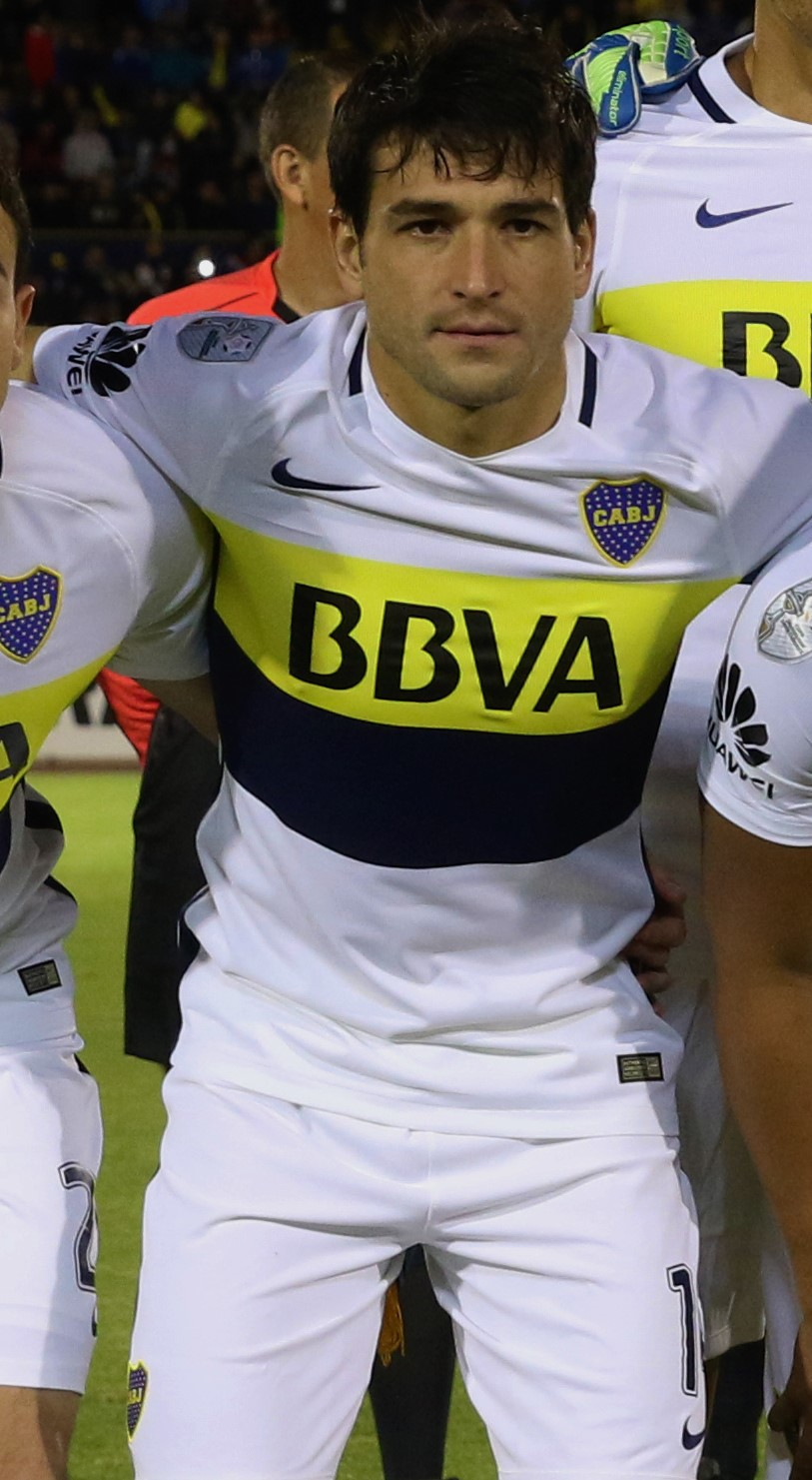
Lodeiro with Boca Juniors in 2016

In 2015, Lodeiro signed with Argentinian club Boca Juniors. In September 2015, Lodeiro scored against River Plate in the Superclásico. On 4 November 2015, Lodeiro scored a penalty in the 2015 Copa Argentina Final helping Boca defeat Rosario Central 2–0, and secure their domestic double.

=== Seattle Sounders ===
In the summer of 2016, Lodeiro was widely rumored to be moving to Major League Soccer club Seattle Sounders. Lodeiro began discussing a transfer with Sounders general manager Garth Lagerwey during the Copa America Centenario, using teammate Luis Suarez as a translator. Lodeiro bid farewell to the Boca Juniors fans in late July amid reports that he would join the Sounders pending his physical. He officially signed with the Sounders on 27 July 2016.

Lodeiro made his club debut on 31 July 2016, starting in the midfield and playing the full 90 minutes of a 1–1 home draw against LA Galaxy. In his first match, Lodeiro recorded 124 total touches, the fourth-highest total of the 2016 season for the Sounders, and 94 passes, the most for Seattle. He scored his first goal for the Sounders on 14 August 2016, at home against Real Salt Lake in the 24th minute of a 2–1 win at Century Link Field.

Lodeiro was also instrumental to the team's MLS Cup run in 2016 under caretaker manager Brian Schmetzer. He scored four goals and provided eight assists in 13 games in the regular season to help Seattle qualify for the playoffs; in the post-season, he scored four more goals in six play-off games as he led the team to the championship. In the MLS Cup Final against Toronto FC at BMO Field on 10 December, following a 0–0 draw after extra time, Lodeiro notched a penalty kick in the resulting shoot-out to keep the Sounders hopes alive; Justin Morrow then missed Toronto's next spot kick, which allowed Román Torres to win the first MLS Cup for the Sounders after netting his kick. When Lodeiro arrived, the Sounders were at the bottom of the league, but because of his ability to create and make others around him better, the Sounders were able to turn their season around. For his performances, he was named the 2016 MLS Newcomer of the Year.

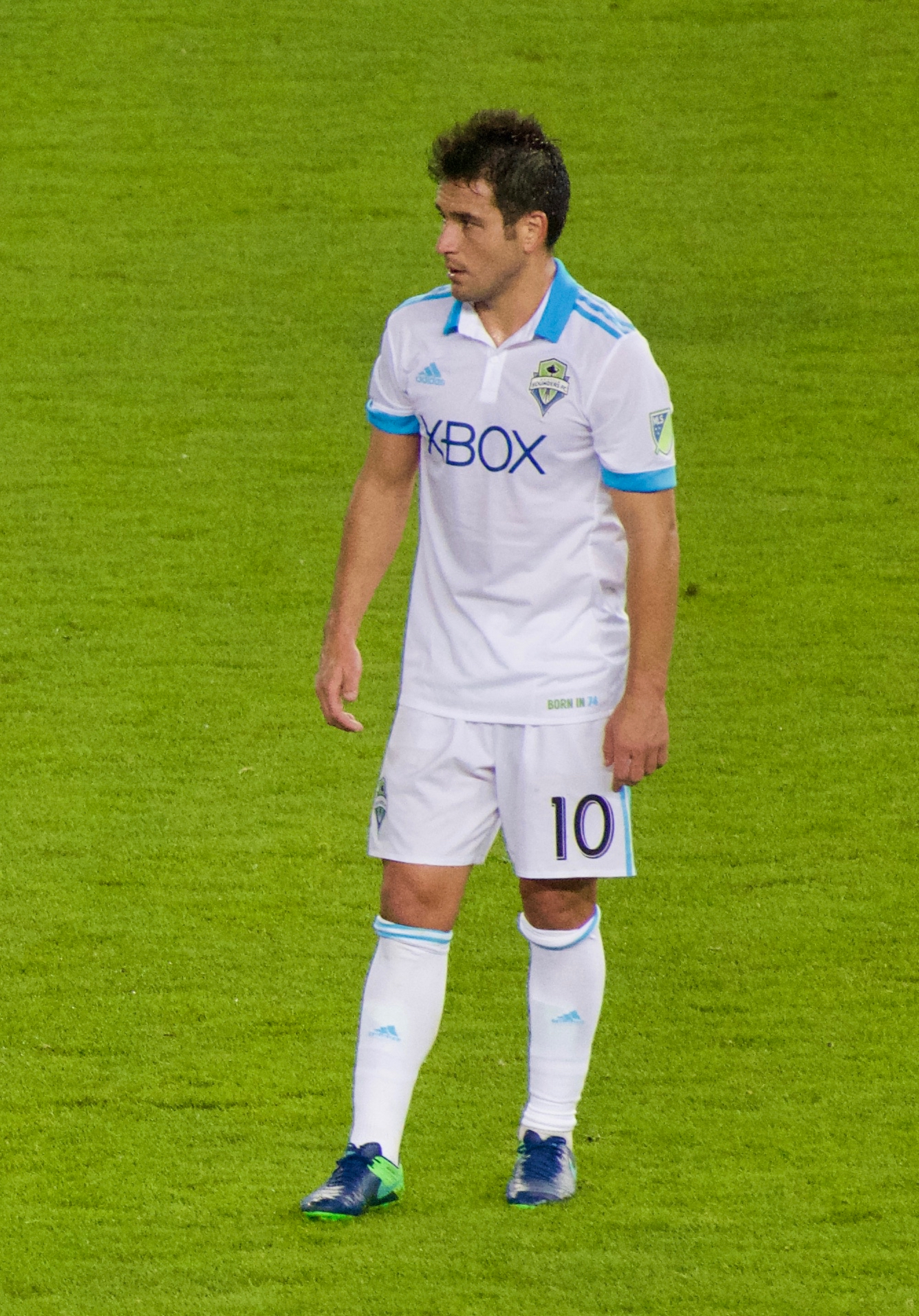
Lodeiro playing for Seattle Sounders in 2017

On 9 December 2017, Lodeiro started in the 2017 MLS Cup Final, which was once again held at BMO Field against Toronto FC; on this occasion, however, Seattle lost 2–0, failing to defend their title.

On 10 November 2019, Lodeiro assisted Víctor Rodríguez's goal in a 3–1 home win over Toronto FC in the MLS Cup Final.

In the 2022 CONCACAF Champions League Final, he scored two penalties in the first leg in a 2–2 draw against UNAM, then another goal in a 3–0 win in the second leg, in which his club secured their first title in the competition by winning 5–2 on aggregate.

On 21 October 2023, in an interview, Lodeiro announced he would not be returning to the Sounders once his contract expired at the end of the season. His departure was confirmed on 12 December.

=== Orlando City ===
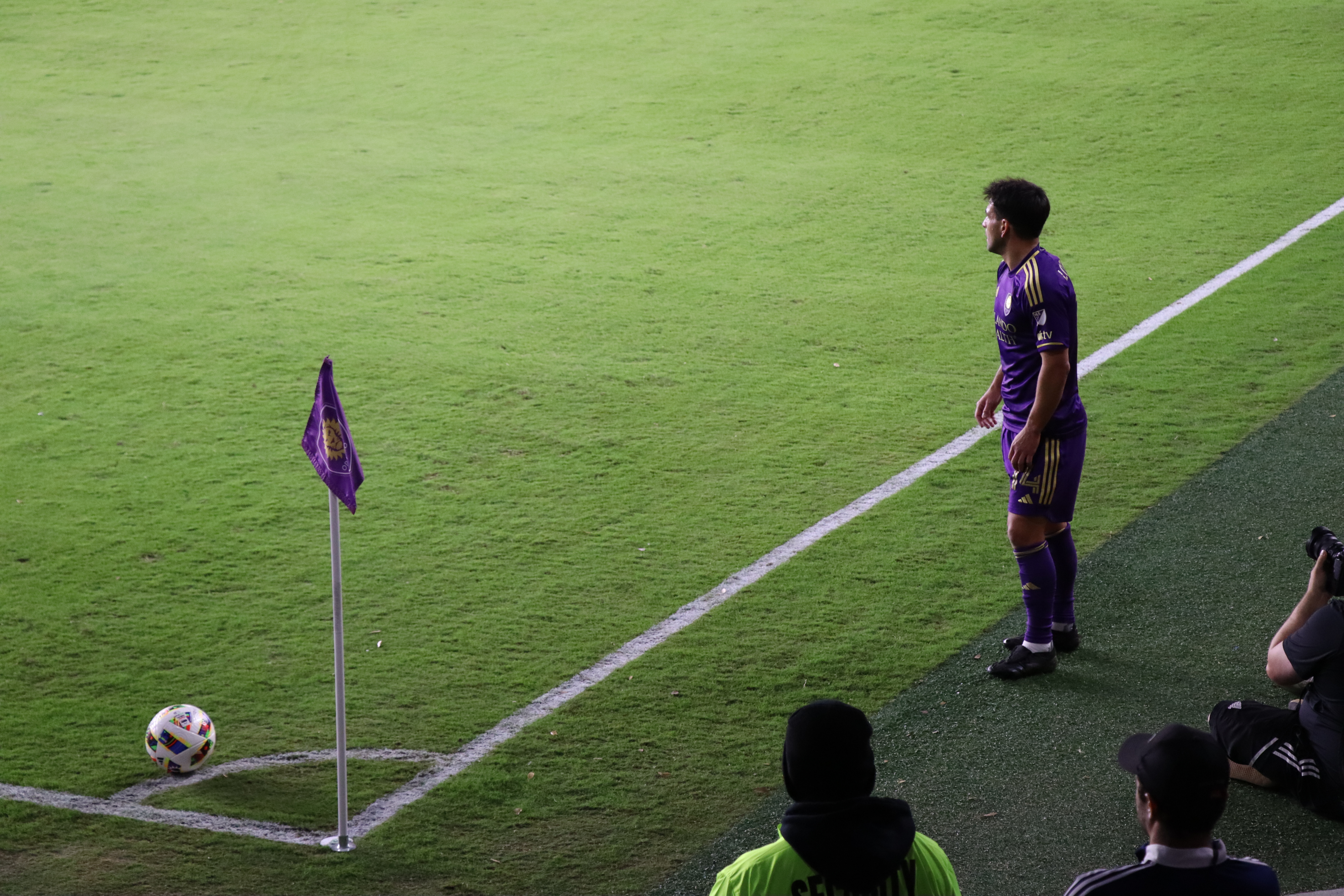
Lodeiro preparing to deliver a corner for Orlando City in 2024

On 4 January 2024, Lodeiro signed as a free agent with Orlando City on a one-year contract with an option for a further year. On 27 February, Lodeiro scored his first goal for the club in the second leg of their tie against Cavalry FC in the 2024 CONCACAF Champions Cup, helping to secure a 3–1 win. Later on 23 March, Lodeiro scored his first regular season goal for the Lions in a 2–0 win over Austin FC. On 11 May, Lodeiro would get a hat-trick of assists by assisting in Duncan McGuire's opening strike and Luis Muriel's brace in a 3–2 win over Philadelphia Union. Lodeiro finished the season with two goals and thirteen assists across 46 appearances in all competitions, tying him with Martín Ojeda for the most assists for the club.

On 18 February 2025, Orlando City and Lodeiro mutually agreed to terminate his contract with the club.

=== Houston Dynamo ===
A day after Lodeiro's contract was terminated with Orlando City, fellow Major League Soccer club Houston Dynamo signed Lodeiro to a one-year contract with a club option for 2026. Three days after signing with Houston Dynamo, Lodeiro made his debut in the opening match of the season, coming on as a 62nd-minute substitute for Ibrahim Aliyu in a 2–1 loss to rivals FC Dallas. On 2 March, Lodeiro scored his first and only goal for the Dynamo, the fifth goal of a 4–1 loss to Inter Miami. On 28 June, Houston Dynamo announced that Lodeiro's final match with the club would be in their following home match against St. Louis City SC that same day and that he would be given a farewell ceremony. During his short tenure with the club, Lodeiro contributed a single goal and assist across 16 appearances.

=== Return to Nacional ===
On 11 July 2025, Lodeiro signed with his boyhood club, Nacional. Lodeiro announced that he intended Nacional to be his final club before retirement and that he wished to contribute to the club in a different capacity after he retired. On 2 August, Lodeiro made his first appearance for the club since his return as he came on as an 83rd-minute substitute for Juan Cruz de los Santos as Nacional defeated Montevideo City 5–2. On 12 October, Lodeiro received a red card in the second half of a scoreless draw with Danubio, a game which Nacional needed to win in order to have an opportunity to place first in the Clausura ahead of Peñarol and face Liverpool in the championship playoff. Nacional manager Pablo Peirano said after the match that he didn't see Lodeiro's expulsion and therefore could not give an opinion on it, but praised his team for managing to hang onto a draw. Nacional won the 2025 Liga AUF Uruguaya at the year's end. Lodeiro would come on as a substitute in the 102nd-minute in the second leg of the final against Peñarol, with the team winning 1–0 in added extra time; the 3–2 aggregate score secured Nacional the title. On 4 August 2026, Lodeiro announced his retirement from professional football at age 37, amid the ongoing 2026 season.

== International career ==
=== Youth ===
During 2009, Lodeiro also progressed on the international scene with good performances for the Uruguay under-20 national team. This included outstanding performances at a South American under-20 tournament in Venezuela where he scored three goals and led Uruguay to third place. He also contributed impressively at the FIFA under-20 tournament in Egypt, scoring two goals in four matches.

=== Senior ===
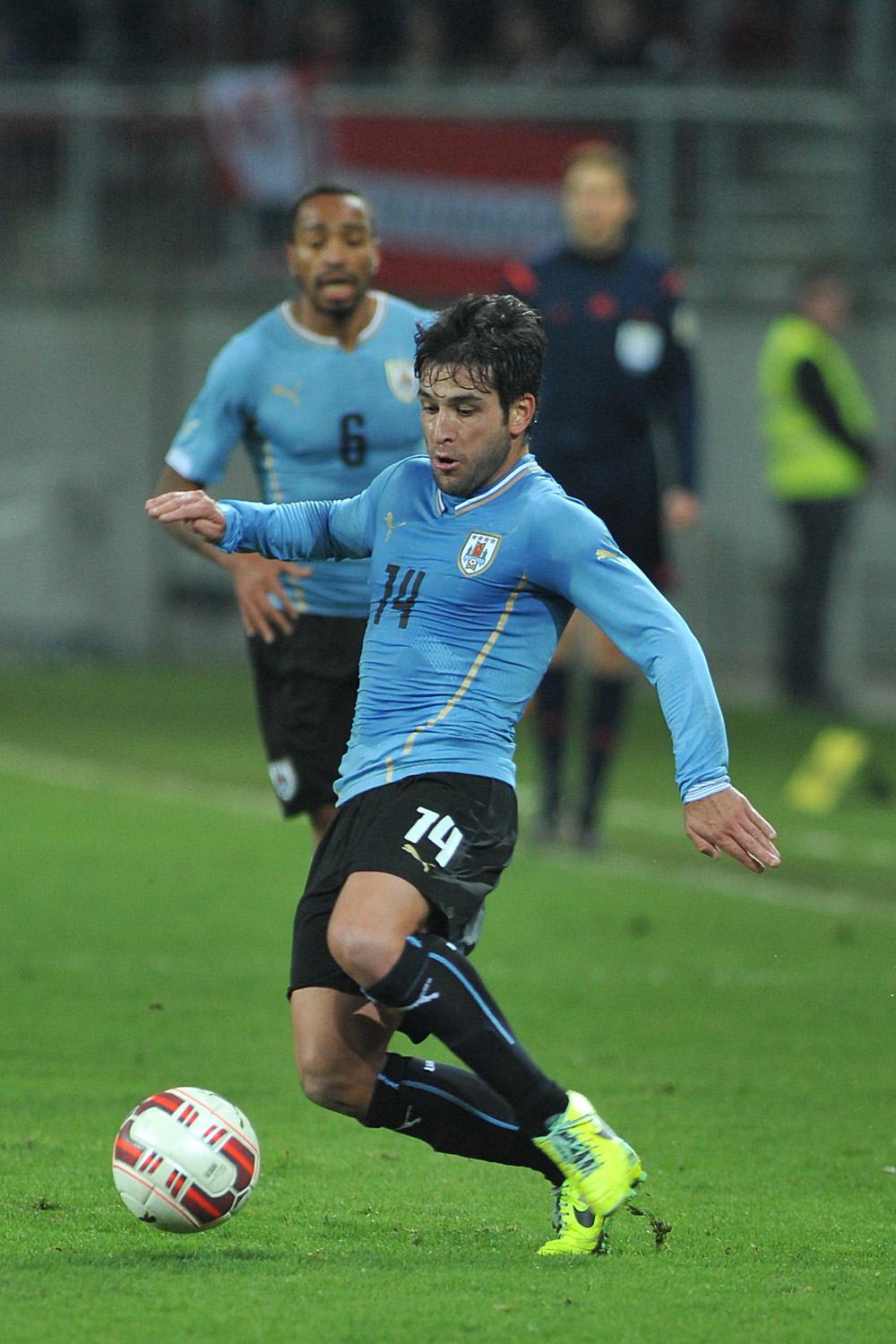
Lodeiro playing for Uruguay in 2014

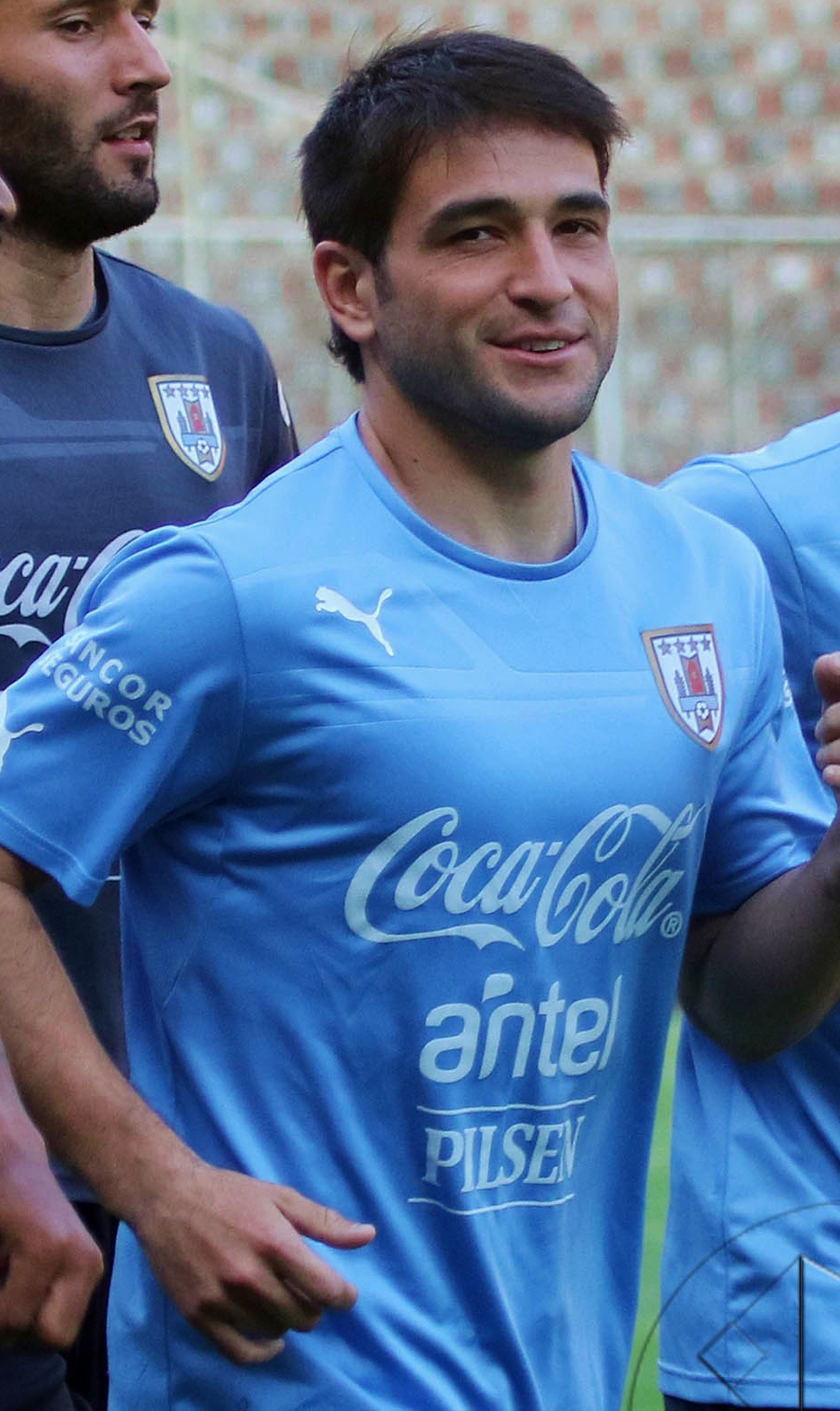
Lodeiro training for Uruguay in 2015

Lodeiro's senior international debut for Uruguay came against Costa Rica, in the CONCACAF–CONMEBOL 2010 World Cup play-off. He played both legs of the play-off and, in the second leg at home, was named player of the match for Uruguay.

Lodeiro played for Uruguay in the 2010 FIFA World Cup finals and, in Uruguay's opening match against France, was the first player to receive a red card at the tournament.

Lodeiro scored his first international goal on 23 June 2011, in a 3–0 friendly home win over Estonia. He was a member of the Uruguay national team that won the 2011 Copa América in Argentina.

Lodeiro was part of Uruguay's team at the 2012 Summer Olympics.

Lodeiro took part at the 2013 FIFA Confederations Cup in Brazil, where Uruguay finished in fourth place. During the tournament, he scored in an 8–0 win over Tahiti on 23 June, in Uruguay's final group match.

Lodeiro was a member of the Uruguay national team that participated in the 2014 FIFA World Cup in Brazil. He started two matches and came in as a substitute in a third.

In May 2015, Lodeiro was included by manager Oscar Tabárez in the final 23-man Uruguay squad for the upcoming Copa América.

Lodeiro was a member of the Uruguay national team that participated in the 2016 Copa América Centenario in the United States. Lodeiro started two matches and came in as a substitute in a third, acquiring one assist in total.

In May 2018, he was named in Uruguay's provisional 26-man squad for the 2018 FIFA World Cup in Russia; he missed out on the final 23-man squad for the tournament, however.

In March 2019, Lodeiro was included in the final 23-man Uruguay squad for the 2019 Copa América in Brazil. On 16 June, he scored the first goal in a 4–0 win over Ecuador in the team's opening group match of the tournament; this was Uruguay's 400th goal in the competition. Uruguay were eliminated by Peru in the quarter-finals of the tournament on 29 June, as a result of a 5–4 penalty shoot-out defeat, following a 0–0 draw after regulation time; Lodeiro did not appear during the match, however, and remained on the bench.

== Style of play ==
A dynamic and technically gifted midfielder with a stocky build, Lodeiro was regarded as a promising prospect as a youngster. He is known for his ability to get past defenders due to his speed, close control, and dribbling skills, which earned him comparisons with compatriot Enzo Francescoli in his youth, as well as the nickname "the Uruguayan Messi." He also possesses good vision, creativity, and passing ability, which enables him to link-up with other players, create chances for teammates, and be involved in the build-up of his team's attacking plays. A versatile playmaker, Lodeiro likes to function in a free role in the centre of the pitch, and usually plays in the number 10 role as an attacking midfielder; in this position, he is given licence to drop deep and come towards a teammate in order to receive the ball and subsequently dictate play with his passing in midfield. However, he also likes to move wide towards the wings in order to overload flanks, and can often be found operating on either side of the pitch as well as in the middle during the course of the same match; as such, he is also capable of playing in several other positions, and has even been deployed as a winger on occasion, or even as a central midfielder, or also as a second striker. Moreover, he is a very energetic player, known for his defensive work-rate off the ball, longevity, tactical intelligence, and ability to mark opponents; his fitness, coupled with his movement across the field enables him to press opposing players, create space by dragging opponents out of position, or make attacking runs from behind into the opposing penalty area. Lodeiro is naturally left footed, and is known for his powerful and accurate striking ability with his stronger foot, which also enables him to score goals, in addition to creating them; he is capable of playing off of either foot. Furthermore, he is a dangerous free kick taker, and is also known for his delivery from set pieces.

== Personal life ==
In February 2018, Lodeiro earned a U.S. green card which qualifies him as a domestic player for MLS roster purposes.

== Career statistics ==
=== Club ===
Appearances and goals by club, season and competition
Club	Season	League			National cup (Note: Includes Copa Uruguay, KNVB Cup, Copa do Brasil, Copa Argentina, U.S. Open Cup)		Continental		Other		Total	
Club	Season	Division	Apps	Goals	Apps	Goals	Apps	Goals	Apps	Goals	Apps	Goals
Nacional	2007–08	Uruguayan Primera División	15	0	—		0	0	—		15	0
Nacional	2008–09	Uruguayan Primera División	20	2	—		10 (Note: Appearances in Copa Libertadores)	4	—		30	6
Nacional	2009–10	Uruguayan Primera División	8	7	—		—		—		8	7
Nacional	Total		43	9	—		10	4	—		53	13
Ajax	2009–10	Eredivisie	8	0	2	1	—		—		10	1
Ajax	2010–11	Eredivisie	0	0	0	0	0	0	0	0	0	0
Ajax	2011–12	Eredivisie	13	2	1	0	5 (Note: One appearance in UEFA Europa League, four appearances and one goal in UEFA Champions League)	1	—		19	3
Ajax	Total		21	2	3	1	5	1	0	0	29	4
Botafogo	2012	Série A	18	2	0	0	1 (Note: Appearance(s) in Copa Sudamericana)	1	0	0	19	3
Botafogo	2013	Série A	26	5	8	1	0	0	16 (Note: Appearances in Campeonato Carioca)	8	50	14
Botafogo	2014	Série A	3	0	0	0	8	0	5	0	16	0
Botafogo	Total		47	7	8	1	9	1	21	8	85	17
Corinthians	2014	Série A	7	0	1	0	0	0	0	0	8	0
Boca Juniors	2015	Argentine Primera División	21	3	5	2	5	1	—		31	6
Boca Juniors	2016	Argentine Primera División	9	3	0	0	9	2	0	0	18	5
Boca Juniors	Total		30	6	5	2	14	3	0	0	49	11
Seattle Sounders	2016	Major League Soccer	13	4	0	0	—		6 (Note: Appearances in MLS Cup playoffs)	4	19	8
Seattle Sounders	2017	Major League Soccer	33	7	0	0	—		5	0	38	7
Seattle Sounders	2018	Major League Soccer	27	8	0	0	3 (Note: Appearances in CONCACAF Champions League/Cup)	2	2	1	32	11
Seattle Sounders	2019	Major League Soccer	28	7	0	0	—		4	2	32	9
Seattle Sounders	2020	Major League Soccer	20 (Note: Includes three appearances and one goal in MLS is Back Tournament group stage)	7	—		0	0	5 (Note: One appearance in MLS is Back Tournament knockout stage, four appearances and one goal in MLS Cup playoffs)	1	25	8
Seattle Sounders	2021	Major League Soccer	9	0	—		—		2 (Note: One appearance and one goal in Leagues Cup, one appearance in MLS Cup playoffs)	1	11	1
Seattle Sounders	2022	Major League Soccer	28	7	0	0	6	5	—		34	12
Seattle Sounders	2023	Major League Soccer	33	1	1	0	0	0	6 (Note: One appearance in FIFA Club World Cup, one appearance and one goal in Leagues Cup, four appearances in MLS Cup playoffs)	1	40	2
Seattle Sounders	Total		191	41	1	0	9	7	30	10	231	58
Orlando City	2024	Major League Soccer	34	1	0	0	4	1	8 (Note: Three appearances in Leagues Cup, five appearances in MLS Cup playoffs)	0	46	2
Houston Dynamo	2025	Major League Soccer	16	1	2	0	—		0	0	18	1
Nacional	2025	Uruguayan Primera División	14	0	0	0	—		—		14	0
Nacional	2026	Uruguayan Primera División	13	0	0	0	6 (Note: Five appearances in Copa Libertadores, one appearance in Copa Sudamericana)	0	0	0	19	0
Nacional	Total		27	0	0	0	6	0	0	0	33	0
Career total			416	67	21	4	57	17	59	18	553	106

=== International ===
Appearances and goals by national team and year
National team	Year	Apps	Goals
Uruguay	2009	2	0
Uruguay	2010	5	0
Uruguay	2011	5	1
Uruguay	2012	2	0
Uruguay	2013	10	2
Uruguay	2014	11	0
Uruguay	2015	9	0
Uruguay	2016	7	1
Uruguay	2017	2	0
Uruguay	2018	1	0
Uruguay	2019	6	1
Total		60	5

Scores and results list Uruguay Olympic team goal tally first, score column indicates score after each Lodeiro goal.

List of Olympic goals scored by Nicolás Lodeiro
No.	Date	Venue	Opponent	Score	Result	Competition
1	26 July 2012	Old Trafford, Manchester, England	United Arab Emirates	2–1	2–1	2012 Olympic Games

Scores and results list Uruguay's goal tally first, score column indicates score after each Lodeiro goal.

List of international goals scored by Nicolás Lodeiro
No.	Date	Venue	Opponent	Score	Result	Competition
1	23 June 2011	Estadio Atilio Paiva Olivera, Rivera, Uruguay	Estonia	3–0	3–0	Friendly
2	23 June 2013	Itaipava Arena Pernambuco, Recife, Brazil	Tahiti	5–0	8–0	2013 FIFA Confederations Cup
3	13 November 2013	Amman International Stadium, Amman, Jordan	Jordan	3–0	5–0	2014 FIFA World Cup qualification
4	6 October 2016	Estadio Centenario, Montevideo, Uruguay	Venezuela	1–0	3–0	2018 FIFA World Cup qualification
5	16 June 2019	Estádio Mineirão, Belo Horizonte, Brazil	Ecuador	1–0	4–0	2019 Copa América

== Honours ==
Nacional

- Primera División: 2008–09, 2025
- Torneo Apertura: 2008, 2009
- Liguilla: 2008

Ajax

- Eredivisie: 2010–11, 2011–12
- KNVB Cup: 2009–10

Botafogo

- Campeonato Carioca: 2013

Boca Juniors

- Primera División: 2015
- Copa Argentina: 2014–15

Seattle Sounders FC

- MLS Cup: 2016, 2019
- CONCACAF Champions League: 2022

Uruguay

- Copa América: 2011

Individual

- MLS Newcomer of the Year: 2016
- CONCACAF Champions League Best XI: 2018, 2022
- MLS All-Star: 2019
- MLS Best XI: 2020
