= Tamatoa Wagemann =

Tahitian footballer (born 1980)

Personal information
- Full name: Tamatoa Wagemann
- Date of birth: 18 March 1980 (age 46)
- Place of birth: Papeete, Tahiti
- Height: 1.88 m (6 ft 2 in)
- Positions: Defender; midfielder

Team information
- Current team: AS Dragon
- Number: 4

Youth career
- FR Haguenau
- Strasbourg

Senior career*
Years	Team	Apps	(Gls)
2003–2004	SV Linx	10	(0)
2004–2007	FC Alle	66	(13)
2007–2010	SO Cholet	57	(15)
2010–2011	Jeunesse Sportive	30	(2)
2011–2013	US Changé		
2013–	AS Dragon		

International career
2011–2013	Tahiti	7	(0)
Medal record
Men's football
Representing Tahiti
OFC Nations Cup
Winner	2012 Solomon Islands
- * Club domestic league appearances and goals

Tamatoa Wagemann (born 18 March 1980) is a footballer from Tahiti who plays for AS Dragon. He is a member of the Tahiti national football team.

== Club career ==
Wagemann was born in Papeete, Tahiti. played one season for the German club SV Linx, which was promoted in 2003 to Oberliga Baden-Württemberg, the fourth tier of German football. He moved on to Switzerland to play for FC Alle in 2004.

In 2007, he left Switzerland and signed for the French club SO Cholet, staying three years with the club and moving to US Changé in 2010 to play at CFA 2, the fifth tier in French football.

== International career ==
Wagemann appeared twice for Tahiti before being selected for the squad that won the 2012 OFC Nations Cup. He started the first match of the tournament and appeared as a substitute in the following two, all during the group stage.

== Career statistics ==
Tahiti national team
Year	Apps	Goals
2011	2	0
2012	5	0
Total	7	0

== Honours ==
Tahiti

- OFC Nations Cup: 2012
