= Eddy Etaeta =

Footballer (born 1970)

Personal information
- Date of birth: 1 June 1970 (age 56)
- Place of birth: Tahiti, French Polynesia
- Position: Midfielder

International career
Years	Team	Apps	(Gls)
1992–1998	Tahiti	5	(0)

Managerial career
- 2010–2015: Tahiti
Medal record
Men's football
Representing Tahiti (as player)
OFC Nations Cup
Runner-up	1996 Oceania
Representing Tahiti (as manager)
OFC Nations Cup
Winner	2012 Solomon Islands
Pacific Games
Third place	2011 New Caledonia

Eddy Etaeta (born 1 June 1970) is a football manager and former player from Tahiti in French Polynesia. He is best known within Oceania for coaching the Tahiti national team to their 2012 OFC Nations Cup title, and is known worldwide for coaching the team during their 2013 FIFA Confederations Cup campaign.

== International career ==
Etaeta played international football for the Tahiti national team and participated in two OFC zone qualifiers for the FIFA World Cup. The first of these was for the 1994 World Cup, in which Etaeta made his international debut in the game against the Solomon Islands on 9 October 1992 in Papeete, Tahiti. The Tahitians won 4–2, and ended up in second place in their group, missing out on qualification. The second qualification tournament was for the 1998 World Cup, which Etaeta played three games which were 5–0 and 2–0 losses to Australia ( 13 and 19 June 1997) and a 1–1 draw with the Solomon Islands (21 June 1997). Etaeta retired from international football in 1998.

== Coaching career ==
In mid-2010 Etaeta was hired by the Tahitian Football Federation to manage the national team. His first tournament as manager was the 2011 Pacific Games. Tahiti ended up finishing a respectable 3rd, winning the bronze medal. However, Etaeta's real success came in 2012, when his Tahiti team won the 2012 OFC Nations Cup in Honiara in the Solomon Islands, the first time they had ever won the tournament. This success meant Tahiti went on to represent the OFC at the 2013 FIFA Confederations Cup, where they went out in the Group Stages.

In 2015 he moved to France, where he coached for the Occitanian regional league.

== Career statistics ==
Tahiti national team
Year	Apps	Goals
1992	1	0
1997	3	0
Total	4¿	0

- ¿: Eddy played a total of 5 games for Tahiti. The 5th game could have been any time between 1992 and 1998.

== Personal life ==
Eddy is married and has two sons.

He also has at least one sibling, Eric Etaeta, who also played international football for Tahiti.

== Honours ==
=== As Player ===
Tahiti

- OFC Nations Cup: runner-up 1996

=== As a manager ===
Tahiti

- OFC Nations Cup: 2012
- Pacific Games: 3rd place 2011
