= Xavier Samin =

French footballer (born 1978)

Personal information
- Full name: Xavier Samin
- Date of birth: 1 January 1978 (age 48)
- Place of birth: Tahiti, French Polynesia
- Height: 1.84 m (6 ft 0 in)
- Position: Goalkeeper

Youth career
- 1986–2000: AS Tefana

Senior career*
| Years | Team | Apps | (Gls) |
| 2000–2012 | AS Tefana | | |
| 2012–2013 | AS Dragon | | |
| 2013–2016 | AS Tefana | | |

International career
| 2001–2013 | Tahiti | 28 | (0) |
Medal record
Men's football
Representing Tahiti
OFC Nations Cup
| Winner | 2012 Solomon Islands |
| Third place | 2002 New Zealand |
Pacific Games
| Bronze medal – third place | 2011 New Caledonia |
- * Club domestic league appearances and goals

Xavier Samin (born 1 January 1978) is a French former footballer who played as a goalkeeper for AS Tefana and AS Dragon in the Tahiti Division Fédérale and the Tahiti national team.

== Career ==
Samin started playing football at the age of eight at AS Tefana. Ten years later he was promoted to Tefana's main adult team, on which he remains to date. In 17 seasons with Tefana, Samin won the Tahiti First Division three times, as well as five Tahiti Cups and the 2007 Tahiti Coupe des Champions. Outside of the field, Samin works as a football teacher, and an accountant.

The first caps for Samin in the Tahitian squad were in 2000. He has since taken part in four FIFA World Cup qualification tournaments, and was a major part of the Tahitian title of the 2012 OFC Nations Cup. Starting the competition as a backup goalkeeper to Mickaël Roche, Samin was promoted to a starting position in the third match, a 4–1 win against Vanuatu. He was also the starting goalkeeper for the next two matches, keeping a clean sheet in the semi-final match against Solomon Islands and in the final against New Caledonia, both won by 1–0. His long experience with the "To'a Aitos" made defensive midfielder Lorenzo Tehau declare that "I’ve played with Samin since I was a kid. He’s like my dad."

The OFC Nations Cup qualified Tahiti for its first international competition, the 2013 FIFA Confederations Cup in Brazil. There Samin played in the team's first game, a 6–1 defeat to Nigeria in Belo Horizonte. He also wrote a fight song for the Tahitian squad, "Song of the To’a Aitos".

== Honours ==
Tahiti

- OFC Nations Cup: 2012; 3rd place 2002
- Pacific Games: Bronze Medalist, 2011
