= Henri Caroine =

Tahitian footballer (born 1981)

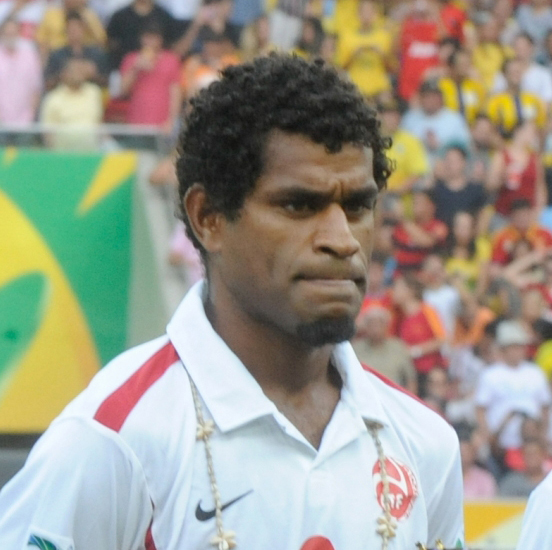
- Caroine with Tahiti at the 2013 FIFA Confederations Cup

Personal information
- Full name: Henri Caroine
- Date of birth: 7 September 1981 (age 45)
- Height: 1.80 m (5 ft 11 in)
- Position: Central midfielder

Senior career*
Years	Team	Apps	(Gls)
2002–2004	AS Temanava		
2004–2011	AS Taravao AC		
2011–2015	AS Dragon		
2015–2016	AS Magenta		
2016	Horizon Patho		

International career
2012–2016	Tahiti	12	(0)
Medal record
Men's football
Representing Tahiti
OFC Nations Cup
Winner	2012 Solomon Islands
- * Club domestic league appearances and goals

Henri Caroine (born 7 September 1981) is a Tahitian former footballer who played as a central midfielder. He made 12 appearances for the Tahiti national team.

== International career ==
Caroine made his debut for the senior team during the 2012 OFC Nations Cup. He appeared in all matches but the first, all of them as a starter.

== Career statistics ==
Tahiti national team
Year	Apps	Goals
2012	5	0
Total	5	0

== Honours ==
Tahiti First Division

- Winner (1): 2012

Tahiti

- OFC Nations Cup: 2012
