= Edson Lemaire =

Tahitian footballer (born 1990)

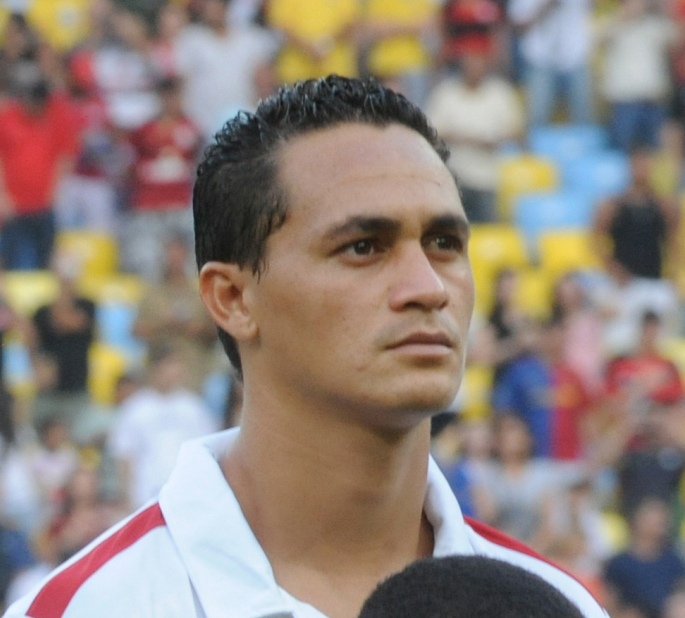
- Lemaire with Tahiti at the 2013 FIFA Confederations Cup

Personal information
- Full name: Edson Lemaire
- Date of birth: 31 October 1990 (age 35)
- Place of birth: Papeete, Tahiti
- Height: 1.79 m (5 ft 10 in)
- Position: Right-back

Team information
- Current team: AS Dragon
- Number: 16

Senior career*
Years	Team	Apps	(Gls)
2009–2012	AS Vairao		
2012–	AS Dragon		

International career^{‡}
2012–	Tahiti	5	(0)
Medal record
Men's football
Representing Tahiti
OFC Nations Cup
Winner	2012 Solomon Islands
- * Club domestic league appearances and goals ‡ National team caps and goals as of 21:46, 20 June 2013 (UTC)

Edson Lemaire (born 31 October 1990) is a Tahitian footballer who plays as a right-back for AS Dragon and Tahiti national team.

== International career ==
Lemaire made his debut for the Tahiti national team during the 2012 OFC Nations Cup starting the match against Vanuatu as a right-back.

== Career statistics ==
Tahiti national team
Year	Apps	Goals
2012	1	0
Total	1	0

== Honours ==
Tahiti

- OFC Nations Cup: 2012
