= Stephane Faatiarau =

Tahitian footballer (born 1990)

Personal information
- Full name: Stephane Faatiarau
- Date of birth: 13 March 1990 (age 36)
- Place of birth: Tahiti
- Height: 1.79 m (5 ft 10 1/2 in)
- Position: Defender

Team information
- Current team: A.S. Central Sport
- Number: 3

Senior career*
Years	Team	Apps	(Gls)
2009–2015	A.S. Tefana		
2015–	A.S. Central Sport		

International career^{‡}
2009	Tahiti U20	2	(0)
2011–	Tahiti	12	(1)
Medal record
Men's football
Representing Tahiti
OFC U-20 Championship
Winner	2008 Tahiti
Pacific Games
Bronze medal – third place	2011 New Caledonia
- * Club domestic league appearances and goals ‡ National team caps and goals as of 20:12, 17 June 2013 (UTC)

Stephane Faatiarau (born 13 March 1990) is a soccer player from Tahiti currently playing for A.S. Central Sport and for Tahiti national football team. He was part of the Tahiti squad at the 2013 FIFA Confederations Cup in Brazil.

== International goals ==
#	Date	Venue	Opponent	Score	Result	Competition
1	3 September 2011	Stade Boewa, Boulari	Kiribati	12–1	17–1	2011 Pacific Games

== Honours ==
Tahiti

- Pacific Games: Bronze Medalist, 2011

Tahiti U20

- OFC U-20 Championship: 2008
