= Samuel Hnanyine =

Tahitian footballer (born 1984)

Personal information
- Full name: Samuel Hnanyine
- Date of birth: 1 March 1984 (age 42)
- Place of birth: New Caledonia
- Height: 1.65 m (5 ft 5 in)
- Position: Forward

Team information
- Current team: A.S. Dragon
- Number: 9

Senior career*
Years	Team	Apps	(Gls)
2002–2011	AS Teara		
2011–	A.S. Dragon		

International career^{‡}
2013–	Tahiti	2	(1)
- * Club domestic league appearances and goals ‡ National team caps and goals as of 20:18, 23 June 2013 (UTC)

Samuel Hnanyine (born 1 March 1984) is a football player from Tahiti currently playing for A.S. Dragon and for Tahiti national football team. He was part of the Tahitian squad at the 2013 FIFA Confederations Cup in Brazil.

== International goals ==
#	Date	Venue	Opponent	Score	Result	Competition
1	22 March 2013	Stade Pater Te Hono Nui, Pirae	Solomon Islands	2–0	2–0	2014 FIFA World Cup qualification
