= Teheivarii Ludivion =

Tahitian footballer (born 1989)

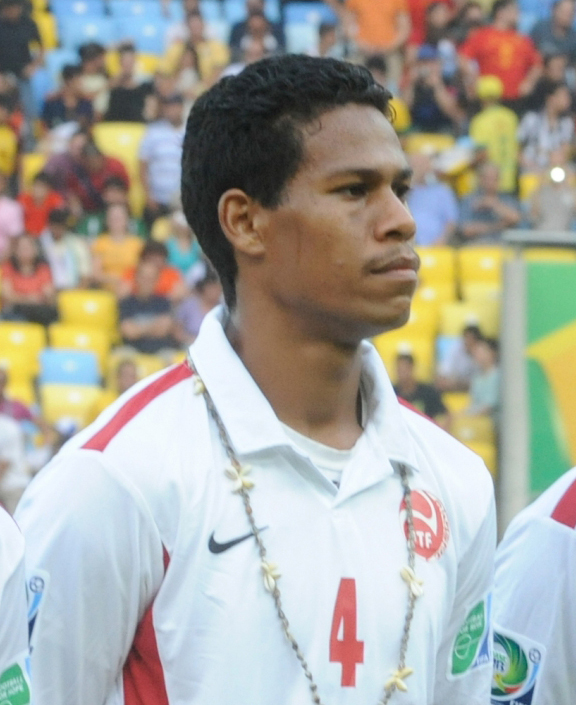
- Ludivion with Tahiti at the 2013 FIFA Confederations Cup

Personal information
- Full name: Teheivarii Ludivion
- Date of birth: 1 July 1989 (age 37)
- Place of birth: Tahiti
- Height: 1.85 m (6 ft 1 in)
- Position: Centre-back

Team information
- Current team: AS Tefana

Senior career*
Years	Team	Apps	(Gls)
2009–2012	AS Vénus		
2012–	AS Tefana		

International career^{‡}
2009	Tahiti U-20	3	(0)
2010–	Tahiti	18	(1)
Medal record
Men's football
Representing Tahiti
OFC Nations Cup
Winner	2012 Solomon Islands
OFC U-20 Championship
Winner	2008 Tahiti
Pacific Games
Bronze medal – third place	2011 New Caledonia
- * Club domestic league appearances and goals as of 10 June 2012 ‡ National team caps and goals as of 20:17, 23 June 2013 (UTC)

Teheivarii Ludivion (born 1 July 1989) is a Tahitian footballer who plays as a centre-back for AS Tefana in the Tahiti First Division. He represented his country in the 2009 FIFA U-20 World Cup and now is a full-time member of the Tahiti national team.

== International career ==
Ludivion made his debut with Tahiti national team at 2010 Coupe de l'Outre-Mer. He was part of the team that won 2012 OFC Nations Cup and started all matches but the first. On 23 June 2013, Ludivion played against Uruguay in the 2013 Confederations Cup and was red carded when he was shown a second yellow card.

== Career statistics ==
Tahiti national team
Year	Apps	Goals
2010	3	0
2011	6	1
2012	7	0
Total	16	1

#	Date	Venue	Opponent	Score	Result	Competition
1	3 September 2011	Stade Boewa, Boulari	Kiribati	9–1	17–1	2011 Pacific Games

== Honours ==
Tahiti

- OFC Nations Cup: 2012
- Pacific Games: Bronze Medalist, 2011

Tahiti U20

- OFC U-20 Championship: 2008
