= Azubuike Egwuekwe =

Nigerian footballer (born 1989)

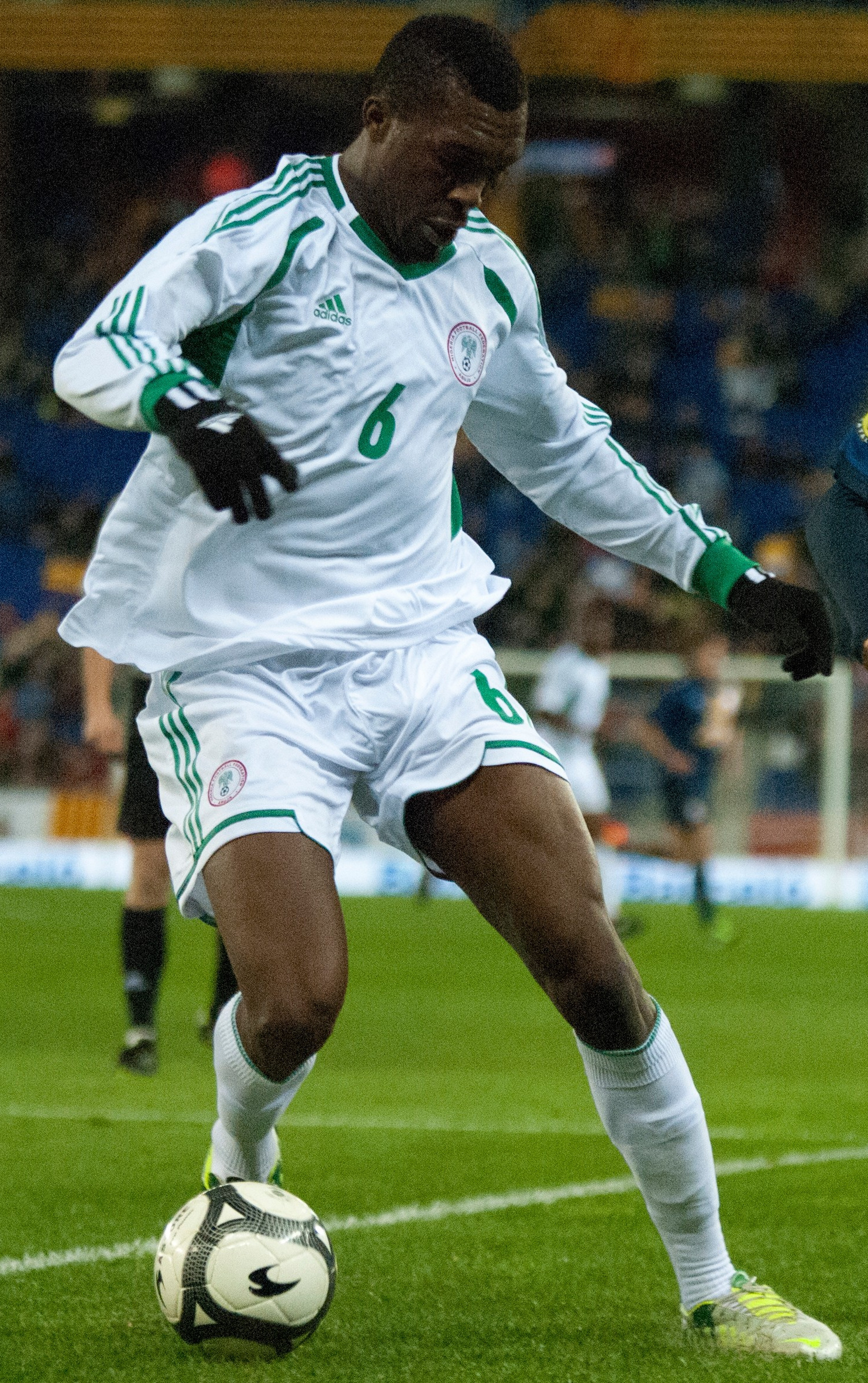
- Egwuekwe in 2013

Personal information
- Full name: Azubuike Emanuel Egwuekwe
- Date of birth: 16 July 1989 (age 37)
- Place of birth: Lafia, Nigeria
- Height: 1.95 m (6 ft 5 in)
- Position: Centre-back

Senior career*
Years	Team	Apps	(Gls)
2006	Nasarawa United		
2007–2008	Yerima Strikers		
2008–2015	Warri Wolves		
2016–2017	KuPS	50	(5)
2017–2018	SuperSport United	12	(2)
2018–2019	Al-Nasr Benghazi		
2019–2020	Rivers United	4	(0)

International career^{‡}
2012–2015	Nigeria	36	(2)
Medal record
Men's football
Representing Nigeria
Africa Cup of Nations
Winner	2013 South Africa
- * Club domestic league appearances and goals as of 16:23, 21 February 2020 (UTC) ‡ National team caps and goals as of 09:30, 28 March 2018 (UTC)

Azubuike Emanuel Egwuekwe MON (born 16 July 1989) is a Nigerian former professional footballer who played as a centre-back. He began his professional career with Nasarawa United in 2006 and went on to play for clubs including KuPS and SuperSport United.

Egwuekwe made his debut for the Nigeria national football team in 2012 and contributed to Nigeria's victory at the 2013 Africa Cup of Nations and qualification for the 2014 FIFA World Cup. He made 36 appearances for the national team between 2012 and 2015, scoring two goals.

== Club career ==
Egwuekwe spent his early career with Nasarawa United, Yerima Strikers and Warri Wolves. In 2015, he helped Warri Wolves finish as runners-up in the Nigeria Professional Football League.

In January 2016, he moved to Finland to join KuPS; across the two seasons, he made 50 league appearances and scored five goals, helping KuPS finish as league runners-up in 2017.

In August 2017, Egwuekwe moved to South Africa after signing a three-year contract with SuperSport United.

After a year at Libyan club Al-Nasr Benghazi, Egwuekwe returned to Nigeria and joined Rivers United in September 2019.

== International career ==
Egwuekwe represented the Nigeria national team from 2012 to 2015, making 36 appearances and scoring two goals. He appeared in FIFA World Cup qualifying matches. He was called up to Nigeria's 23-man squad for the 2013 Africa Cup of Nations.

He was also selected for Nigeria's squad at the 2013 FIFA Confederations Cup, and the 2014 African Nations Championship.

He was also a squad member at the 2014 FIFA World Cup.

== Career statistics ==
=== International ===
Appearances and goals by national team and year
National team	Year	Apps	Goals
Nigeria	2012	12	1
Nigeria	2013	11	0
Nigeria	2014	11	0
Nigeria	2015	2	1
Total		36	2

Scores and results list Nigeria's goal tally first, score column indicates score after each Egwuekwe goal.

List of international goals scored by Azubuike Eguekwe
No.	Date	Venue	Opponent	Score	Result	Competition
1	9 June 2012	Kamuzu Stadium, Blantyre, Malawi	Malawi	1–0	1–1	2014 FIFA World Cup qualification
2	17 January 2015	The Sevens Stadium, Dubai, United Arab Emirates	Yemen	2–0	2–0	Friendly

== Honours ==
Orders

- Member of the Order of the Niger
