= Nicolas Vallar =

Tahitian footballer (born 1983)

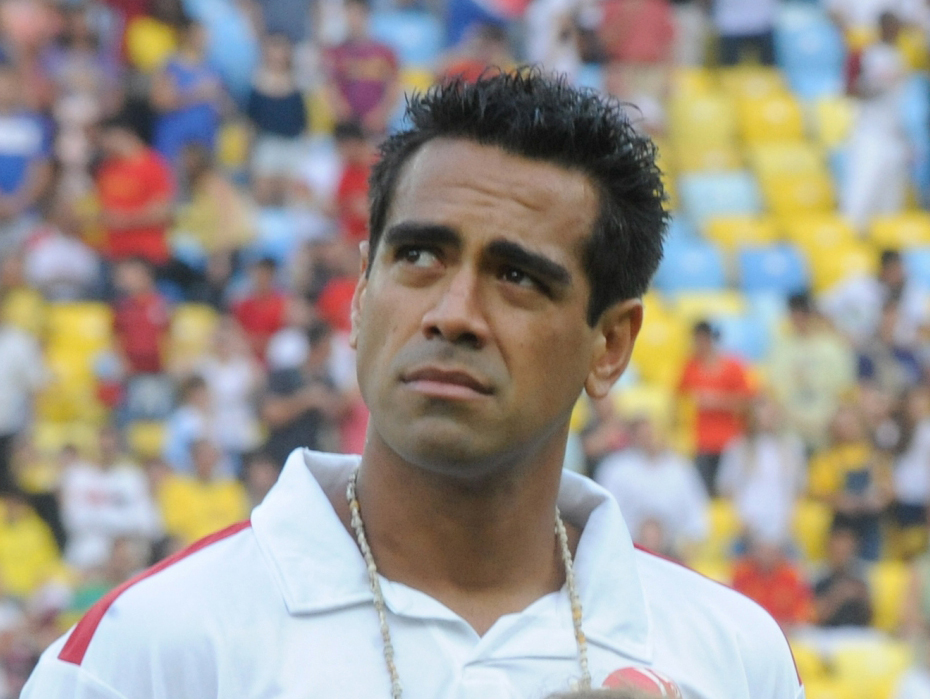
- Vallar with Tahiti at the 2013 FIFA Confederations Cup

Personal information
- Full name: Hiro Nicolas Vallar
- Date of birth: 22 October 1983 (age 43)
- Place of birth: Papeete, Tahiti
- Height: 1.83 m (6 ft 0 in)
- Position: Centre-back

Youth career
- 1997–2001: Angers

Senior career*
Years	Team	Apps	(Gls)
2001–2003	Montpellier B	36	(2)
2003–2006	Sète 34	44	(1)
2006–2007	Penafiel	0	(0)
2008	AS Excelsior		
2008–2009	Montceau	0	(0)
2009–2014	Dragon		
2014–2015	Pirae		
2015–2017	Tefana		
2017–?	Central Sport		

International career
2001	Tahiti U20	3	(1)
2012–2016	Tahiti	16	(3)
Medal record
Men's football
Representing Tahiti
OFC Nations Cup
Winner	2012 Solomon Islands
- * Club domestic league appearances and goals

Hiro Nicolas Vallar (born 22 October 1983) is a Tahitian former footballer who plays as a centre-back. He is a former member of the Tahiti national team.

== Club career ==
Vallar started his career with Angers before signing for Montpellier reserve team in 2001 to play at CFA, the fourth tier of football in France. In 2003, he left Montpellier and joined Sète, where he played for three years and managed to achieve promotion to Ligue 2 in 2005, only to be relegated back to Championnat National in the following season.

Having played seven matches in the Ligue 2 campaign, Vallar left for Penafiel in 2006. Without a single appearance with the Portuguese club, he was released in 2007, joining Réunionese club AS Excelsior in 2008, returning to France in the same year to play for CFA club FC Montceau.

In 2009, Vallar returned to his homeland to play for AS Dragon, winning the Tahiti First Division in 2011–12.

== International career ==
Vallar was part of Tahiti U-20 at 2001 OFC U-20 Championship scoring in 6–2 win against New Caledonia.

Vallar made his debut for the senior team during 2012 OFC Nations Cup, being the team's captain, scoring twice from the penalty spot and receiving the Golden Ball award as Tahiti won the competition for the first time. Vallar was in the Tahitian team in the 2013 Confederations Cup. He scored an own goal in a 6–1 loss to Nigeria.

== Career statistics ==
Tahiti national team
Year	Apps	Goals
2012	11	3
2013	1	0
Total	12	3

#	Date	Venue	Opponent	Score	Result	Competition
1	3 June 2012	Lawson Tama Stadium, Honiara	New Caledonia	2–0	4–3	2012 OFC Nations Cup
2	5 June 2012	Lawson Tama Stadium, Honiara	Vanuatu	1–0	4–1	2012 OFC Nations Cup
3	28 September 2012	Clairefontaine, Clairefontaine-en-Yvelines	French Guiana	1–2	1–2	2012 Coupe de l'Outre-Mer

== Honours ==
AS Dragon

- Tahiti First Division: 2012

Tahiti

- OFC Nations Cup: 2012
