= Heimano Bourebare =

Tahitian footballer (born 1989)

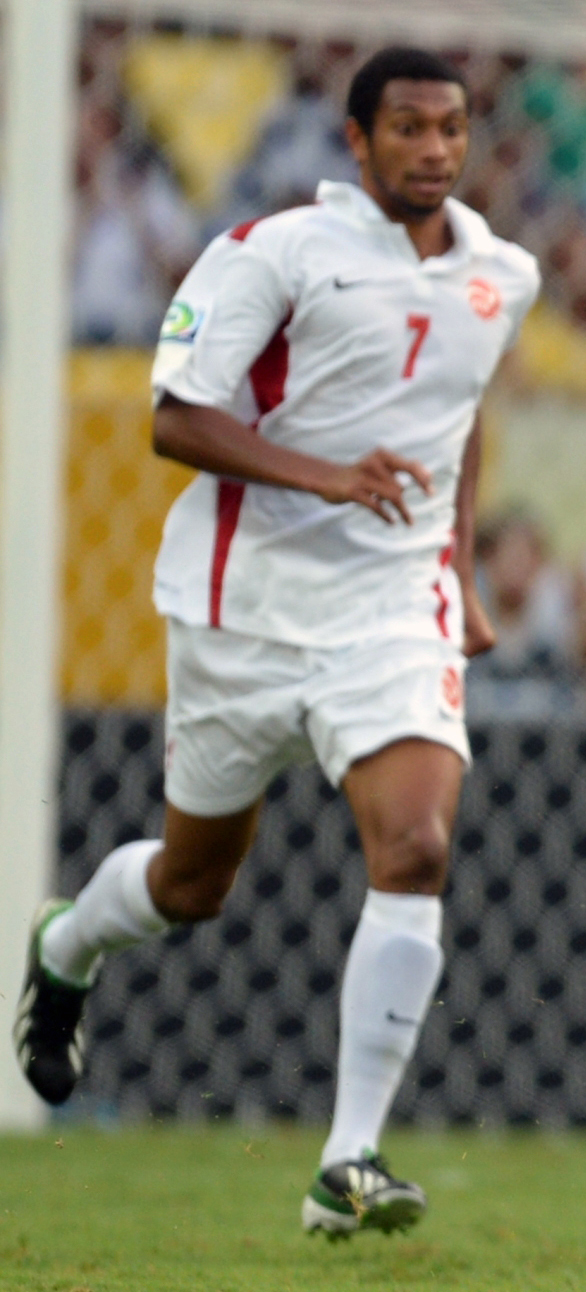
- Bourebare playing for Tahiti at the 2013 FIFA Confederations Cup

Personal information
- Full name: Heimano Donovan Bourebare
- Date of birth: 15 May 1989 (age 37)
- Place of birth: Tahiti
- Height: 1.80 m (5 ft 11 in)
- Position: Midfielder

Team information
- Current team: A.S. Tefana
- Number: 19

Senior career*
Years	Team	Apps	(Gls)
2008–2009	AS Taravao AC		
2009–2012	A.S. Tefana		
2012–2013	AS Mont-Dore		
2013	AS Dragon		
2013–2019	A.S. Tefana		
2019–	A.S. Pirae		

International career^{‡}
2010	Tahiti U-20	3	(0)
2011–	Tahiti	30	(1)
Medal record
Men's football
Representing Tahiti
OFC Nations Cup
Winner	2012 Solomon Islands
OFC U-20 Championship
Winner	2008 Tahiti
Pacific Games
Bronze medal – third place	2011 New Caledonia
- * Club domestic league appearances and goals ‡ National team caps and goals as of 24 March 2023

Heimano Donovan Bourebare (born 15 May 1989) is a Tahitian footballer who plays as a midfielder for A.S. Pirae. He represented his country in the 2009 FIFA U-20 World Cup and now is a full-time member of the Tahiti national team. He was in the starting line-up in the five 2012 OFC Nations Cup matches, where his national side won the tournament for the first time.

Bourebare's mother is Tahitian and his father is from New Caledonia.

== Career statistics ==
Appearances and goals by national team and year
National team	Year	Apps	Goals
Tahiti	2010	2	0
Tahiti	2011	6	0
Tahiti	2012	5	0
Tahiti	2013	3	1
Tahiti	2016	5	0
Tahiti	2017	2	0
Tahiti	2018	2	0
Tahiti	2022	3	0
Tahiti	2023	2	0
Total		30	1

Scores and results list Tahiti's goal tally first, score column indicates score after each Bourebare goal.

List of international goals scored by Heimano Bourebare
No.	Date	Venue	Opponent	Score	Result	Competition
1	22 March 2013	Stade Pater Te Hono Nui, Pirae	Solomon Islands	1–0	2–0	2014 FIFA World Cup qualification
–	21 May 2015	Stade Pater Te Hono Nui, Pirae	Argentina under-20	1–1	3–1	Friendly

== Honours ==
A.S. Tefana

- Tahiti First Division:2010, 2011
- Tahiti Cup: 2010, 2011
- OFC Champions League: runner-up, 2012

Tahiti

- OFC Nations Cup: 2012
- Pacific Games: Bronze Medalist, 2011

Tahiti U20

- OFC U-20 Championship: 2008
