= Ricky Aitamai =

Tahitian footballer (born 1991)

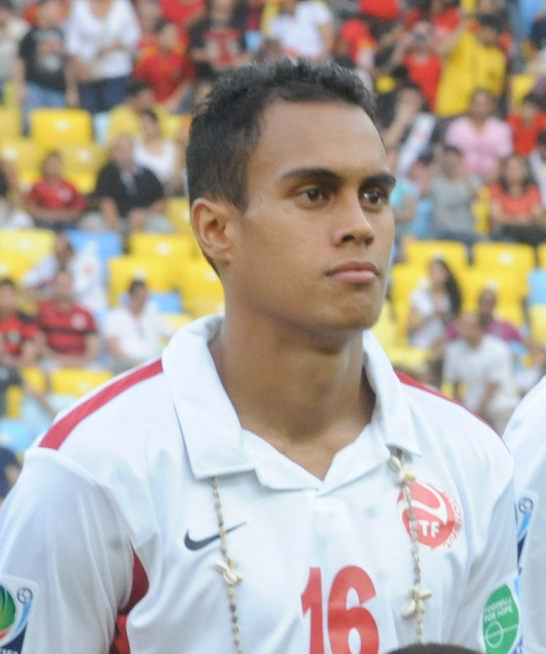
- Aitamai with Tahiti at the 2013 FIFA Confederations Cup

Personal information
- Full name: Ricky Aitamai
- Date of birth: 22 December 1991 (age 34)
- Place of birth: Tahiti
- Height: 1.78 m (5 ft 10 in)
- Position: Midfielder

Senior career*
Years	Team	Apps	(Gls)
2011–	A.S. Vénus		

International career^{‡}
2013–	Tahiti	6	(0)
- * Club domestic league appearances and goals ‡ National team caps and goals as of 12 June 2016

Ricky Aitamai (born 22 December 1991) is a football player from Tahiti currently playing for A.S. Vénus and the Tahiti national football team. He was part of the Tahitian squad at the 2013 FIFA Confederations Cup in Brazil.
