= Gilbert Meriel =

Tahitian footballer (born 1986)

Personal information
- Full name: Gilbert Meriel
- Date of birth: 11 November 1986 (age 40)
- Place of birth: Tahiti
- Height: 1.86 m (6 ft 1 in)
- Position: Goalkeeper

Team information
- Current team: A.S. Vénus
- Number: 1

Youth career
- 1995–2000: A.S. Vénus
- 2000–2003: Angers
- 2003–2006: Carquefou

Senior career*
Years	Team	Apps	(Gls)
2006–2008	Carquefou		
2010–2011	A.S. Tefana		
2011–2014	AS Central Sport		
2014–	A.S. Vénus		

International career^{‡}
2011–	Tahiti	4	(0)
Medal record
Men's football
Representing Tahiti
Pacific Games
Bronze medal – third place	2011 New Caledonia
- * Club domestic league appearances and goals ‡ National team caps and goals as of 20:16, 23 June 2013 (UTC)

Gilbert Meriel (born 11 November 1986) is a football player from Tahiti who plays for A.S. Vénus and for the Tahiti national team. He was part of the Tahitian squad at the 2013 FIFA Confederations Cup in Brazil.

Meriel started playing soccer at the age of nine on Tahitian club A.S. Vénus. Five years later, he went to France to join the youth academy at Angers, where he stayed for three years. While in France, Meriel also played for US Jeanne d'Arc Carquefou competing in the lower leagues, before returning home at 18. Upon his return home Meriel, like many of his national team colleagues, was forced to get another job and become a semi-professional athlete. Metiel earned a bachelor in economy and administration, becoming an auditor for consulting group KPMG.

On the Confederations Cup, Meriel had his first cap as the starting goalkeeper for Tahiti's in the squad's final game against Uruguay in Recife. While Tahiti lost 8-0, Meriel was applauded once he saved a penalty kick from the eventually sent-off Andres Scotti.

== Honours ==
Tahiti

- Pacific Games: Bronze Medalist, 2011
