= Mikaël Roche =

Tahitian footballer (born 1982)

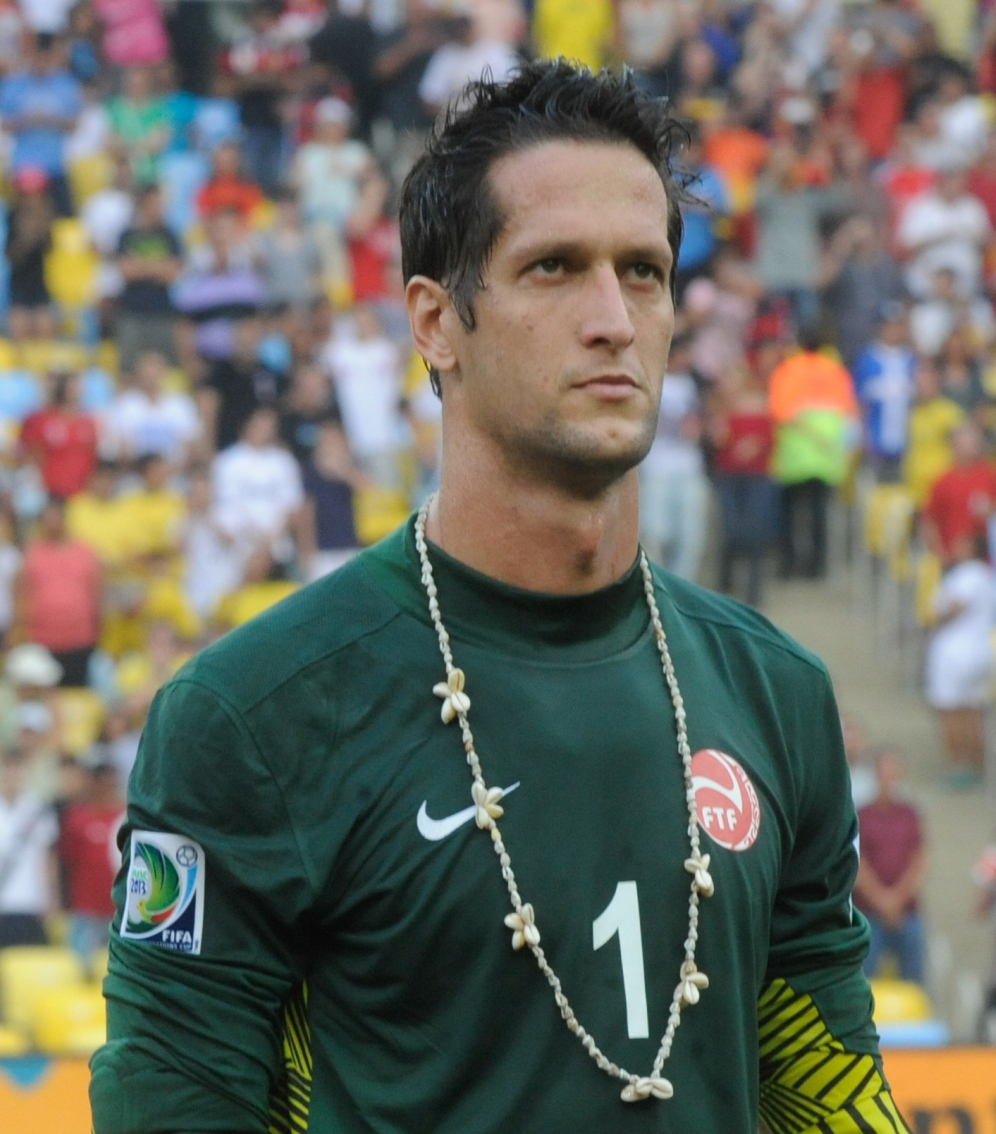
- Roche with Tahiti at the 2013 FIFA Confederations Cup

Personal information
- Full name: Mikaël Roche
- Date of birth: 24 December 1982 (age 43)
- Place of birth: Papeete, Tahiti
- Height: 1.90 m (6 ft 3 in)
- Position: Goalkeeper

Team information
- Current team: A.S. Tefana
- Number: 29

Senior career*
Years	Team	Apps	(Gls)
1999–2000	AS Jeunes Tahitiens		
2000–2001	AS Monaco B		
2001–2005	ROS Menton		
2005–2006	US Marseille Endoume		
2006–2009	AS Jeunes Tahitiens		
2009–2014	AS Dragon		
2014–2018	A.S. Tefana		
2018–	A.S. Central Sport		

International career^{‡}
2011–2017	Tahiti	14	(0)
Medal record
Men's football
Representing Tahiti
OFC Nations Cup
Winner	2012 Solomon Islands
Pacific Games
Bronze medal – third place	2011 New Caledonia
Men's Beach soccer
Representing Tahiti
OFC Beach Soccer Nations Cup
Third place	2006 Tahiti
- * Club domestic league appearances and goals ‡ National team caps and goals as of 12 Oct 2018

Mikaël Roche (born 24 December 1982) is a footballer from Papeete, Tahiti, who plays as a goalkeeper for A.S. Central Sport. He is a member of the Tahiti national football team.

== Career ==
Roche started his career with local club AS Jeunes before moving to France to play for AS Monaco reserve team in 2000. He moved to ROS Menton in the following year, staying with the team until 2005, later transferring to US Marseille Endoume.

Roche returned to Tahiti in 2006 to his former club AS Jeunes, joining AS Dragon in 2009 and winning the Tahiti First Division in 2011–12. Roche is also a PE teacher. He has stated this in an interview.

== International career ==
Roche made his debut for the Tahiti in 2011 and was the starting goalkeeper at 2012 OFC Nations Cup before losing his starting place to Xavier Samin after the first two matches, as the team won the competition for the first time. On 20 June 2013, he conceded ten goals against Spain in the 2013 FIFA Confederations Cup, he however was considered a hero during this match and won the support of the Brazilian fans. He also traded shirts with his counterpart, Pepe Reina after the match.

== Honours ==
AS Dragon

- Tahiti First Division: 2012

Tahiti

- OFC Nations Cup: 2012
- Pacific Games: Bronze Medalist, 2011
- OFC Beach Soccer Nations Cup: 3rd place, 2006

== International career statistics ==
Tahiti national team
Year	Apps	Goals
2011	2	0
2012	3	0
2013	2	0
2014	0	0
2015	0	0
2016	5	0
2017	2	0
Total	14	0
