= A.S. Roniu =

AS Roniu
- Ground: Stade Pater Te Hono Nui; Papeete
- League: Tahiti First Division
- 2012—2013: 5th

AS Roniu is an association football club in Tahiti. They play in the Tahiti First Division. They play home games at Stade Pater Te Hono Nui.
