= A.S. Tamarii Faa'a =

Tahitian football club

AS Tamarii
- Full name: AS Tamarii Faa'a
- Ground: Stade Louis Ganivet
- Capacity: 5,000
- League: Tahiti First Division
- 2009–2010: 6th

AS Tamarii is a football (soccer) club in Faaa, Tahiti. They play in the Tahiti First Division. They play home games at Stade Louis Ganivet.
