= Football at the 2011 Pacific Games – Men's team squads =

The 2011 Pacific Games football tournament was an international football tournament held in New Caledonia from 27 August until 9 September 2011. The 11 national teams involved in the tournament were required to register a squad of players; only players in these squads were eligible to take part in the tournament.

Players marked (c) were named as captain for their national squad. Players' club teams and players' age as of 27 August 2011 – the tournament's opening day.

== Group A ==
=== Tuvalu ===
Coach: (Netherlands) Foppe de Haan

No.	Pos.	Player	Date of birth (age)	Caps	Club
1	GK	Katepu Sieni	11 May 1988 (aged 23)		(Tuvalu) Tofaga
2	DF	Kolone Pokia	3 March 1989 (aged 22)		(Tuvalu) Tofaga
3	DF	Alamoana Tofuola	28 March 1990 (aged 21)		(Tuvalu) Tamanuku
4	DF	Etimoni Timuani	14 August 1991 (aged 20)		(Tuvalu) Lakena United
5	DF	Ali Takataka	24 April 1988 (aged 23)		(Tuvalu) Tofaga
6	MF	Mau Penisula (c)	15 May 1979 (aged 32)		(Tuvalu) Tofaga
7	MF	Vaisua Liva	20 January 1993 (aged 18)		(Tuvalu) Manu Laeva
8	MF	Okilani Tinilau	2 January 1989 (aged 22)		(Tuvalu) Manu Laeva
9	FW	Lutelu Tiute	6 October 1990 (aged 20)		(Tuvalu) Tofaga
10	MF	James Lepaio	6 September 1992 (aged 18)		(Tuvalu) Tofaga
11	DF	George Panapa	6 October 1992 (aged 18)		(Tuvalu) Tofaga
12	FW	Alopua Petoa	24 January 1990 (aged 21)		(Tuvalu) Tofaga
13	MF	Togavai Stanley	9 July 1992 (aged 19)		(Tuvalu) Nauti
14	MF	Raj Sogivalu	19 January 1990 (aged 21)		(Tuvalu) Nauti
15	GK	Faiana Ofati	2 February 1991 (aged 20)		(Tuvalu) Lakena United
16	GK	Jelly Selau	23 July 1983 (aged 28)		(Tuvalu) Manu Laeva
17	MF	Uota Ale	6 June 1986 (aged 25)		(Tuvalu) Tofaga
18	MF	Meauma Petaia	15 August 1990 (aged 21)		(Tuvalu) Tamanuku
19	MF	Akelei Lima'alofa	13 November 1989 (aged 21)		(Tuvalu) Manu Laeva
20	FW	Lopati Okelani	17 August 1988 (aged 23)		(Tuvalu) Nui
24	DF	Joshua Tui Tapasei	30 May 1979 (aged 32)		(Tuvalu) Nauti

=== American Samoa ===
Coach: Iofi Lalogafuafua

No.	Pos.	Player	Date of birth (age)	Caps	Club
1	GK	Nicky Salapu	18 August 1979 (aged 32)		(Austria) SC Mauerbach
2	DF	Terrence Sinapati	21 September 1982 (aged 28)		(American Samoa) PanSa East
3	MF	Edgar Apulu	20 April 1989 (aged 22)		(American Samoa) PanSa East
4	DF	Daru Taumua	1 November 1991 (aged 19)		(American Samoa) Pago Youth
5	DF	Rafe Luvu	2 September 1990 (aged 20)		(American Samoa) Lion Heart
6	MF	Natia Natia	2 March 1985 (aged 26)		(American Samoa) Lion Heart
7	MF	Ismael Herrera	3 October 1991 (aged 19)		(American Samoa) PanSa East
8	MF	Casper Kuresa	7 January 1991 (aged 20)		(American Samoa) ASCC FC
9	MF	Liatama Amisone (c)	2 March 1989 (aged 22)		(American Samoa) Pago Youth
10	FW	Charlie Uhrle	25 September 1992 (aged 18)		(American Samoa) Lion Heart FC
11	FW	Shalom Luani	5 August 1994 (aged 17)		(American Samoa) Tafuna Jets
12	FW	Suani Uelese	30 May 1991 (aged 20)		(American Samoa) Lion Heart FC
13	DF	Uasi Heleta	21 January 1986 (aged 25)		(American Samoa) Pago Youth
14	DF	Pesamino Victor	4 September 1986 (aged 24)		(American Samoa) PanSa East
15	DF	Johnny Saelua	19 July 1988 (aged 23)		(American Samoa) FC SKBC
16	DF	Travis Sinapati	21 September 1982 (aged 28)		(American Samoa) PanSa East
17	FW	Lemusa Alatasi	Unknown		(American Samoa) Pago Youth
23	GK	Chin-Fu Ta'ase	18 July 1990 (aged 21)		(American Samoa) Pago Youth

=== Solomon Islands ===
Coach: Jacob Moli

No.	Pos.	Player	Date of birth (age)	Caps	Club
1	GK	Shadrack Ramoni	5 May 1988 (aged 23)		(Solomon Islands) Koloale
2	DF	Hadisi Aengari	23 October 1988 (aged 22)		(Solomon Islands) Solomon Warriors
3	DF	Timothy Joe	15 April 1986 (aged 25)		(Solomon Islands) Western United
4	DF	Tome Faisi	21 January 1982 (aged 29)		(Solomon Islands) Kossa
5	DF	Samson Takayama	19 February 1979 (aged 32)		(Solomon Islands) Koloale
6	DF	Nelson Sale	7 October 1986 (aged 24)		(Vanuatu) Amicale
7	MF	Michael Fifi'i	24 December 1987 (aged 23)		(New Zealand) Team Wellington
8	DF	George Suri	16 July 1982 (aged 29)		(Solomon Islands) Koloale
9	FW	Benjamin Totori	20 February 1986 (aged 25)		(Solomon Islands) Koloale
10	FW	Joe Luwi	18 July 1983 (aged 28)		(Vanuatu) Tafea
11	FW	Ian Paia	28 September 1990 (aged 20)		(Solomon Islands) Koloale
12	MF	Joe Manu	13 November 1984 (aged 26)		(Solomon Islands) Hana
13	MF	Mostyn Beui	21 January 1980 (aged 31)		(Solomon Islands) Koloale
14	MF	Jeffery Bule	15 November 1991 (aged 19)		(Solomon Islands) Koloale
15	DF	Seni Ngava	14 September 1988 (aged 22)		(Solomon Islands) Kossa
16	MF	James Naka	9 October 1984 (aged 26)		(Fiji) Rewa
17	FW	Abraham Iniga	21 November 1979 (aged 31)		(Solomon Islands) Marist Fire
18	MF	Henry Fa'arodo (c)	5 October 1982 (aged 28)		(Solomon Islands) Koloale
19	MF	Joses Nawo	1 January 1977 (aged 34)		(Solomon Islands) Koloale
20	GK	Jimmy Qwaina	8 August 1988 (aged 23)		(Solomon Islands) Hana

=== Guam ===
Coach: (Japan) Kazuo Uchida

No.	Pos.	Player	Date of birth (age)	Caps	Club
1	GK	Brett Maluwelmeng	19 February 1985 (aged 26)		(Guam) Quality Distributors
3	DF	Matthew Cruz	23 January 1986 (aged 25)		(Guam) Cars Plus
4	DF	Scott Leon Guerrero	22 August 1990 (aged 21)		(Guam) Fuji-Ichiban Espada
5	DF	Edward Calvo	30 April 1990 (aged 21)		(Guam) Cars Plus
6	MF	Shawn Spindel	8 May 1993 (aged 18)		(Guam) Quality Distributors
7	MF	Ian Mariano	7 October 1990 (aged 20)		(Guam) Cars Plus
8	DF	Dominic Gadia (c)	18 January 1986 (aged 25)		(Guam) Cars Plus
9	FW	Elias Merfalen	7 September 1989 (aged 21)		(Guam) Cars Plus
10	MF	Jason Cunliffe	23 October 1983 (aged 27)		Guam Shipyard
11	FW	Christian Schweizer	6 January 1995 (aged 16)		(Guam) Fuji-Ichiban Espada
12	MF	Dylan Naputi	4 January 1995 (aged 16)		(Guam) Quality Distributors
13	FW	David Manibusan	30 July 1982 (aged 29)		Guam Shipyard
14	MF	Andre Gadia	17 October 1989 (aged 21)		(Guam) Cars Plus
15	MF	Jonathan Odell	25 February 1995 (aged 16)		(Guam) Father Dueñas Memorial School
16	GK	Joseph Laanan	14 February 1988 (aged 23)		(Guam) Cars Plus
17	DF	Mark Chargualaf	3 January 1991 (aged 20)		(Guam) Cars Plus
18	GK	Julius Campos	15 November 1989 (aged 21)		(Guam) Paintco Strykers

=== New Caledonia ===
Coach: (France) Christophe Coursimault

No.	Pos.	Player	Date of birth (age)	Caps	Club
1	GK	Jean-Yann Dounezek	20 January 1986 (aged 25)		(New Caledonia) Magenta
2	MF	Joël Wakanumuné	30 September 1986 (aged 24)		(France) Imphy Decize
3	DF	Kenji Vendegou	7 February 1986 (aged 25)		(New Caledonia) Lössi
4	MF	Joris Gorendiawé	18 July 1990 (aged 21)		(New Caledonia) Magenta
5	MF	César Lolohea	29 August 1989 (aged 21)		(France) Laval
6	MF	Dominique Wacalie	14 August 1982 (aged 29)		(France) Imphy Decize
7	DF	Patrick Qaézé	12 February 1992 (aged 19)		(New Caledonia) Gaïtcha
8	MF	Marius Bako	22 February 1985 (aged 26)		(New Caledonia) Gaïtcha
9	FW	Iamel Kabeu	7 September 1982 (aged 28)		(French Polynesia) Manu-Ura
10	MF	Pierre Wajoka (c)	19 December 1978 (aged 32)		(New Caledonia) Gaïtcha
11	FW	Bertrand Kaï	6 June 1983 (aged 28)		(New Caledonia) Hienghène Sport
12	FW	Michel Hmaé	21 March 1978 (aged 33)		(New Caledonia) Mont-Dore
13	DF	André Sinédo	26 February 1978 (aged 33)		(New Caledonia) Magenta
14	DF	Judikael Ixoée	17 March 1990 (aged 21)		(New Caledonia) Magenta
15	FW	Jacques Haeko	23 April 1984 (aged 27)		(New Caledonia) Lössi
16	GK	Rocky Nyikeine	26 May 1992 (aged 19)		(New Caledonia) Gaïtcha
17	DF	Georges Béaruné	27 July 1989 (aged 22)		(New Caledonia) Gaïtcha
18	DF	Emile Béaruné	7 February 1990 (aged 21)		(New Caledonia) Gaïtcha
19	FW	Georges Gope-Fenepej	23 October 1988 (aged 22)		(New Caledonia) Magenta
20	GK	Dimitri Petemou	3 August 1980 (aged 31)		(New Caledonia) Thio Sport
21	MF	Arsène Boawé	2 July 1979 (aged 32)		(New Caledonia) Thio Sport
22	DF	Olivier Dokunengo	4 September 1979 (aged 31)		(New Caledonia) Mont-Dore
23	DF	Jean-Patrick Wakanumuné	13 March 1980 (aged 31)		(New Caledonia) Mont-Dore

=== Vanuatu ===
Coach: Saby Natonga

No.	Pos.	Player	Date of birth (age)	Caps	Club
1	GK	Ernest Bong	29 February 1984 (aged 27)		(Vanuatu) Amicale
2	DF	Alphonse Bongnaim	22 August 1985 (aged 26)		(Vanuatu) Amicale
3	DF	Selwyn Sese Aala	14 August 1986 (aged 25)		(Vanuatu) Amicale
4	DF	Rexley Tarivuti	1 December 1985 (aged 25)		(Vanuatu) Spirit 08
5	DF	Georges Tabe	23 October 1986 (aged 24)		(Vanuatu) Siaraga
6	FW	Kensi Tangis	19 December 1991 (aged 19)		(Vanuatu) Milo
7	MF	Jean Robert Yelou (c)	25 September 1983 (aged 27)		(Vanuatu) Amicale
8	MF	Saimata Chilia	2 August 1978 (aged 33)		(Vanuatu) Amicale
9	FW	Robert Tasso	18 December 1989 (aged 21)		(Vanuatu) Spirit 08
10	MF	Richard Garae	18 September 1982 (aged 28)		(Vanuatu) Amicale
11	MF	Michel Kaltak	12 November 1990 (aged 20)		(Vanuatu) Tafea
12	MF	Eddison Stephen	2 October 1992 (aged 18)		(Vanuatu) Teouma Academy
13	DF	Nikiau Filiamy	10 September 1987 (aged 23)		(Vanuatu) Spirit 08
14	DF	Andrew Chichirua	12 May 1986 (aged 25)		(Vanuatu) Tafea
15	FW	Daniel Michel	20 June 1986 (aged 25)		(Vanuatu) Shepherds United
16	GK	Chikau Mansale	13 January 1983 (aged 28)		(Vanuatu) Amicale
17	FW	Yvong August Wilson	27 December 1992 (aged 18)		(Vanuatu) Teouma Academy
18	MF	Daniel Natou	25 November 1989 (aged 21)		(Vanuatu) Tafea
19	DF	Ricky Tari	2 March 1984 (aged 27)		(Vanuatu) Spirit 08
20	DF	Lucien Hinge	21 March 1992 (aged 19)		(Vanuatu) Teouma Academy
21	DF	Brian Kaltak	30 September 1993 (aged 17)		(New Zealand) Waterside Karori
22	FW	Jean Kaltak	19 August 1994 (aged 17)		(Vanuatu) Teouma Academy

== Group B ==
=== Papua New Guinea ===
Coach: (Australia) Frank Farina

No.	Pos.	Player	Date of birth (age)	Caps	Club
1	GK	Leslie Kalai	6 December 1984 (aged 26)		(Papua New Guinea) Hekari United
2	MF	Tonga Esira	31 December 1987 (aged 23)		(Papua New Guinea) Hekari United
3	DF	Valentine Nelson	12 April 1987 (aged 24)		(Papua New Guinea) Tukoko University
4	DF	Cyril Muta	10 October 1987 (aged 23)		(Papua New Guinea) Eastern Stars
5	DF	Kelly Jampu	22 October 1986 (aged 24)		(Papua New Guinea) University Inter
6	MF	Samuel Kini	10 October 1987 (aged 23)		(Papua New Guinea) Hekari United
7	FW	Gari Moka	16 November 1983 (aged 27)		(Australia) Nunawading City
8	MF	Michael Foster	5 September 1985 (aged 25)		(Papua New Guinea) Hekari United
9	FW	Alex Davani	17 August 1985 (aged 26)		(Australia) Brisbane City
10	FW	Reg Davani	5 February 1980 (aged 31)		(Australia) Sunshine George Cross
11	MF	Nathaniel Lepani	20 January 1982 (aged 29)		(Australia) Brisbane City
12	MF	David Muta (c)	24 October 1987 (aged 23)		(Papua New Guinea) Hekari United
13	MF	Andrew Lepani	28 August 1979 (aged 31)		(Papua New Guinea) Hekari United
14	MF	Niel Hans	24 April 1988 (aged 23)		(Papua New Guinea) Hekari United
15	FW	Jamal Seeto	8 September 1990 (aged 20)		(Papua New Guinea) Besta PNG United
16	DF	Jeremy Yasasa	27 March 1985 (aged 26)		(Papua New Guinea) Eastern Stars
17	FW	Mauri Wasi	6 September 1982 (aged 28)		(New Zealand) Waikato
18	FW	Eric Komeng	16 June 1984 (aged 27)		(Papua New Guinea) Hekari United
19	DF	Koriak Upaiga	13 June 1987 (aged 24)		(Papua New Guinea) Hekari United
20	GK	David Aua	26 November 1978 (aged 32)		(Papua New Guinea) Hekari United
21	DF	Felix Bondaluke	10 December 1986 (aged 24)		(Papua New Guinea) University Inter
22	FW	Ian Yanum	11 February 1983 (aged 28)		(Papua New Guinea) Hekari United
23	GK	Ronald Warisan	20 August 1989 (aged 22)		(Papua New Guinea) Rapatona

=== Cook Islands ===
Coach: (New Zealand) Maurice Tillotson

No.	Pos.	Player	Date of birth (age)	Caps	Club
1	GK	Tony Jamieson (c)	16 March 1974 (aged 37)		(Cook Islands) Nikao
2	DF	John Pareanga	2 October 1980 (aged 30)		(Cook Islands) Matavera
3	DF	Nathan Tisam	6 July 1988 (aged 23)		(Cook Islands) Nikao
4	MF	Roger Manuel	10 November 1988 (aged 22)		(Cook Islands) Tupapa
5	MF	John Quijano	2 September 1990 (aged 20)		(Cook Islands) Nikao
6	MF	Allan Boere	18 January 1990 (aged 21)		(New Zealand) Waitakere City
7	MF	Joseph Ngauora	30 June 1989 (aged 22)		(Australia) Picton Rangers
8	MF	Grover Harmon	6 August 1989 (aged 22)		(Cook Islands) Tupapa
9	FW	Campbell Best	12 March 1986 (aged 25)		(Cook Islands) Tupapa
10	FW	Nikorima Te Miha	1 January 1980 (aged 31)		(Cook Islands) Puaikura
11	FW	Taylor Saghabi	25 December 1990 (aged 20)		(Australia) West Ryde Rovers
12	DF	Branden Turepu	25 July 1990 (aged 21)		(Cook Islands) Tupapa
14	MF	Nicholas Funnell	9 July 1982 (aged 29)		(Australia) Beecroft Wombats
16	DF	Mii Joseph	14 August 1988 (aged 23)		(Cook Islands) Tupapa
17	DF	Tahiri Elikana	14 September 1988 (aged 22)		(Cook Islands) Avatiu
18	MF	Tuka Tisam	8 July 1986 (aged 25)		(Cook Islands) Nikao
19	FW	Anoanga Tisam	25 April 1982 (aged 29)		(Cook Islands) Nikao
20	GK	Ngatokorua Elikana	17 September 1983 (aged 27)		(Cook Islands) Avatiu

=== Fiji ===
Coach: Gurjit Singh

No.	Pos.	Player	Date of birth (age)	Caps	Club
1	GK	Simione Tamanisau (c)	5 June 1982 (aged 29)		(Fiji) Rewa
2	DF	Avinesh Waran Suwamy	22 February 1986 (aged 25)		(Fiji) Ba
3	DF	Lorima Dau	22 January 1983 (aged 28)		(Fiji) Navua
4	MF	Seveci Rokotakala	29 May 1978 (aged 33)		(Fiji) Navua
5	MF	Pene Erenio	20 January 1981 (aged 30)		(Fiji) Navua
6	DF	Jone Vesikula	30 April 1986 (aged 25)		(Fiji) Ba
7	MF	Pita Baleitoga	30 November 1984 (aged 26)		(Fiji) Labasa
8	FW	Alvin Singh	9 June 1988 (aged 23)		(Fiji) Ba
9	MF	Malakai Tiwa	3 October 1986 (aged 24)		(Fiji) Ba
10	FW	Tuimasi Manuca	14 May 1985 (aged 26)		(Fiji) Ba
11	FW	Roy Krishna	20 August 1987 (aged 24)		(New Zealand) Waitakere United
12	MF	Alvin Avinesh	6 April 1982 (aged 29)		(Fiji) Labasa
13	FW	Maciu Dunadamu	14 June 1986 (aged 25)		(Fiji) Labasa
14	DF	Taniela Waqa	22 June 1983 (aged 28)		(Fiji) Labasa
15	DF	Archie Watkins	15 September 1989 (aged 21)		(Fiji) Suva
16	DF	Ilaitia Tuilau	8 May 1987 (aged 24)		(Fiji) Labasa
17	DF	Malakai Kainihewe	28 July 1977 (aged 34)		(Fiji) Ba
18	DF	Esava Naqeleca	4 January 1989 (aged 22)		(Fiji) Suva
19	GK	Akuila Mateisuva	15 January 1992 (aged 19)		(Fiji) Labasa
20	GK	Beniamino Mateinaqara	18 August 1987 (aged 24)		(Fiji) Nadi

=== Tahiti ===
Coach: Eddy Etaeta

No.	Pos.	Player	Date of birth (age)	Caps	Club
1	GK	Xavier Samin (c)	1 January 1978 (aged 33)		(French Polynesia) Tefana
2	DF	Stéphane Faatiarau	13 March 1990 (aged 21)		(French Polynesia) Tefana
3	DF	Vetea Tepa	6 September 1974 (aged 36)		(French Polynesia) Manu-Ura
4	DF	Tauraa Marmouyet	10 February 1991 (aged 20)		(French Polynesia) Tefana
5	DF	Teheivarii Ludivion	1 July 1989 (aged 22)		(French Polynesia) Vénus
6	MF	Donovan Bourebare	15 May 1989 (aged 22)		(French Polynesia) Tefana
7	MF	Garry Rochette	6 January 1990 (aged 21)		(French Polynesia) Manu-Ura
8	DF	Jonathan Tehau	5 January 1988 (aged 23)		(French Polynesia) Tamarii
9	FW	Taufa Neuffer	30 August 1978 (aged 32)		(French Polynesia) Tefana
10	FW	Teaonui Tehau	1 September 1992 (aged 18)		(French Polynesia) Vénus
11	MF	Lorenzo Tehau	10 April 1989 (aged 22)		(French Polynesia) Tefana
12	MF	Hiroana Poroiae	14 June 1986 (aged 25)		(French Polynesia) Manu-Ura
13	FW	Steevy Chong Hue	26 January 1990 (aged 21)		(French Polynesia) Dragon
14	FW	Stanley Atani	27 January 1990 (aged 21)		(French Polynesia) Jeunes Tahitiens
15	MF	Efrain Arañeda	5 June 1978 (aged 33)		(French Polynesia) Dragon
16	MF	Temarii Tinorua	4 September 1986 (aged 24)		(French Polynesia) Tamarii
17	MF	Sébastien Labayen	8 April 1974 (aged 37)		(French Polynesia) Tefana
18	DF	Jean-Claude Chang Koei	14 August 1987 (aged 24)		(French Polynesia) Tefana
19	MF	Billy Mataitai	20 July 1983 (aged 28)		(French Polynesia) Manu-Ura
20	GK	Mickaël Roche	24 December 1982 (aged 28)		(French Polynesia) Dragon
21	GK	Gilbert Meriel	11 November 1986 (aged 24)		(French Polynesia) Tefana

=== Kiribati ===
Coach: Pine Iosefa

No.	Pos.	Player	Date of birth (age)	Caps	Club
1	GK	Tarariki Tarotu	22 July 1974 (aged 37)		
3	DF	Kaake Kamta	28 August 1980 (aged 30)		
4	MF	Kaben Ioteba	24 February 1992 (aged 19)		(Kiribati) Makin FC
5	DF	Enri Tenukai	17 December 1985 (aged 25)		(Kiribati) Betio Town Council
6	DF	Nabaruru Batiri	1 December 1984 (aged 26)		
7	FW	Atanuea Eritara	24 October 1992 (aged 18)		(Kiribati) Marakei FC
8	FW	Antin Nanotaake	3 July 1982 (aged 29)		(Kiribati) Betio Town Council
9	MF	Atino Baraniko	6 April 1985 (aged 26)		(Kiribati) Betio Town Council
10	MF	Jeff Jong (c)	4 April 1971 (aged 40)		(Kiribati) Marakei FC
11	FW	Joseph Yan	25 January 1993 (aged 18)		(Vanuatu) Tafea
12	DF	Beniamina Kaintikuaba	3 December 1993 (aged 17)		(Kiribati) Marakei FC
13	FW	Erene Bakineti	2 July 1982 (aged 29)		(Kiribati) Marakei FC
14	FW	Karotu Bakaane	20 April 1987 (aged 24)		(Kiribati) Betio Town Council
15	FW	Martin Miriata	10 November 1996 (aged 14)		(Kiribati) Makin FC
16	DF	Baruru Kaiorake	1 April 1980 (aged 31)		(Kiribati) Betio Town Council
17	MF	Biitamatang Keakea	26 March 1989 (aged 22)		(Kiribati) Betio Town Council
18	MF	Tongarua Akori	30 June 1983 (aged 28)		
21	GK	Tiaon Miika	4 November 1992 (aged 18)		
