= Tahiti national football team results (2000–present) =

This page details the match results and statistics of the Tahiti national football team from 2000 to present.

== Key ==
Key to matches

- Att.=Match attendance
- (H)=Home ground
- (A)=Away ground
- (N)=Neutral ground

Key to record by opponent

- Pld=Games played
- W=Games won
- D=Games drawn
- L=Games lost
- GF=Goals for
- GA=Goals against

== Results ==
Tahiti's score is shown first in each case.

| No. | Date | Venue | Opponents | Score | Competition | Tahiti scorers | Att. | Ref. |
|---|---|---|---|---|---|---|---|---|
| 151 | 6 June 2000 | Paranuu Stadium, Papeete (N) | American Samoa | 18–0 | 2000 Polynesia Cup | Unknown | — | |
| 152 | 8 June 2000 | Paranuu Stadium, Papeete (N) | Samoa | 2–1 | 2000 Polynesia Cup | Unknown | — | |
| 153 | 10 June 2000 | Paranuu Stadium, Papeete (N) | Tonga | 8–1 | 2000 Polynesia Cup | Unknown | — | |
| 154 | 12 June 2000 | Paranuu Stadium, Papeete (N) | Cook Islands | 2–0 | 2000 Polynesia Cup | Unknown | — | |
| 155 | 19 June 2000 | Stade Pater Te Hono Nui, Pirae (N) | New Zealand | 0–2 | 2000 OFC Nations Cup | | 1,000 | |
| 156 | 23 June 2000 | Stade Pater Te Hono Nui, Pirae (N) | Vanuatu | 2–3 | 2000 OFC Nations Cup | Rousseau, Amaru | 300 | |
| 157 | 4 June 2001 | North Harbour Stadium, Auckland (N) | Vanuatu | 6–1 | 2002 FIFA World Cup qualification | Senechal, Bennett (3), Amaru, Tagawa | 400 | |
| 158 | 6 June 2001 | North Harbour Stadium, Auckland (N) | New Zealand | 0–5 | 2002 FIFA World Cup qualification | | 2,052 | |
| 159 | 11 June 2001 | North Harbour Stadium, Auckland (N) | Cook Islands | 6–0 | 2002 FIFA World Cup qualification | Senechal (2), Tagawa (3), Bennett | 300 | |
| 160 | 13 June 2001 | North Harbour Stadium, Auckland (N) | Solomon Islands | 2–0 | 2002 FIFA World Cup qualification | Garcia, Fatapua-Lecaill | 250 | |
| 161 | 5 July 2002 | North Harbour Stadium, Auckland (N) | New Zealand | 0–4 | 2002 OFC Nations Cup | | 1,000 | |
| 162 | 7 July 2002 | North Harbour Stadium, Auckland (N) | Solomon Islands | 3–2 | 2002 OFC Nations Cup | Booene, Tagawa, Fatupua-Lecaill | 1,000 | |
| 163 | 9 July 2002 | North Harbour Stadium, Auckland (N) | Papua New Guinea | 3–1 | 2002 OFC Nations Cup | Garcia, Tagawa (2) | 800 | |
| 164 | 12 July 2002 | Mount Smart Stadium, Auckland (N) | Australia | 1–2 (g.g.) | 2002 OFC Nations Cup | Zaveroni | 400 | |
| 165 | 14 July 2002 | Mount Smart Stadium, Auckland (N) | Vanuatu | 1–0 | 2002 OFC Nations Cup | | 1,000 | |
| 166 | 30 June 2003 | National Stadium, Suva (N) | Federated States of Micronesia | 17–0 | 2003 South Pacific Games | Tagawa (4), Finay (o.g.), Guyon (3), Bennett (4), Tchen, Papura, Senechal, Fatupua-Lecaill, Terevaura | — | |
| 167 | 3 July 2003 | National Stadium, Suva (N) | Papua New Guinea | 3–0 | 2003 South Pacific Games | Bennett (2), Tagawa | 1,000 | |
| 168 | 5 July 2003 | Ratu Cakobau Park, Nausori (N) | New Caledonia | 0–4 | 2003 South Pacific Games | | 3,000 | |
| 169 | 7 July 2003 | Churchill Park, Lautoka (N) | Tonga | 4–0 | 2003 South Pacific Games | Tagawa (2), Bennett (2) | 3,000 | |
| 170 | 9 July 2003 | Churchill Park, Lautoka (N) | Fiji | 1–2 (a.s.d.e.t.) | 2003 South Pacific Games | Papura | 8,000 | |
| 171 | 11 July 2003 | National Stadium, Suva (N) | Vanuatu | 0–1 | 2003 South Pacific Games | | 6,000 | |
| 172 | 10 May 2004 | Lawson Tama Stadium, Honiara (N) | Cook Islands | 2–0 | 2006 FIFA World Cup qualification | Temataua, Moretta | 12,000 | |
| 173 | 12 May 2004 | Lawson Tama Stadium, Honiara (N) | New Caledonia | 0–0 | 2006 FIFA World Cup qualification | | 14,000 | |
| 174 | 17 May 2004 | Lawson Tama Stadium, Honiara (N) | Tonga | 2–0 | 2006 FIFA World Cup qualification | Wajoka, Temataua | 400 | |
| 175 | 19 May 2004 | Lawson Tama Stadium, Honiara (N) | Solomon Islands | 1–1 | 2006 FIFA World Cup qualification | Simon | 18,000 | |
| 176 | 29 May 2004 | Hindmarsh Stadium, Adelaide (N) | Fiji | 0–0 | 2004 OFC Nations Cup | | 3,000 | |
| 177 | 31 May 2004 | Hindmarsh Stadium, Adelaide (N) | Australia | 0–9 | 2004 OFC Nations Cup | | 1,200 | |
| 178 | 2 June 2004 | Hindmarsh Stadium, Adelaide (N) | Solomon Islands | 0–4 | 2004 OFC Nations Cup | | 50 | |
| 179 | 4 June 2004 | Marden Sports Complex, Adelaide (N) | New Zealand | 0–10 | 2004 OFC Nations Cup | | 200 | |
| 180 | 6 June 2004 | Marden Sports Complex, Adelaide (N) | Vanuatu | 2–1 | 2004 OFC Nations Cup | Temataua, Wajoka | 200 | |
| 181 | 25 August 2007 | Toleofoa Joseph Blatter Soccer Complex, Apia (N) | New Caledonia | 0–1 | 2007 South Pacific Games | | 400 | |
| 182 | 29 August 2007 | Toleofoa Joseph Blatter Soccer Complex, Apia (N) | Tuvalu | 1–1 | 2007 South Pacific Games | Williams | 100 | |
| 183 | 1 September 2007 | Toleofoa Joseph Blatter Soccer Complex, Apia (N) | Fiji | 0–4 | 2007 South Pacific Games | | 200 | |
| 184 | 3 September 2007 | Toleofoa Joseph Blatter Soccer Complex, Apia (N) | Cook Islands | 1–0 | 2007 South Pacific Games | Tinorua | 100 | |
| 185 | 24 September 2008 | Stade de Marville, La Courneuve (N) | New Caledonia | 0–1 | 2008 Coupe de l'Outre-Mer | | — | |
| 186 | 27 September 2008 | Stade Municipal, Melun (N) | Martinique | 0–1 | 2008 Coupe de l'Outre-Mer | | — | |
| 187 | 30 September 2008 | Stade Olympique Yves-du-Manoir, Colombes | Guadeloupe | 0–1 | 2008 Coupe de l'Outre-Mer | | — | |
| 188 | 23 September 2010 | Parc des Sports des Maisons Rouges, Bry-sur-Marne (N) | Martinique | 1–4 | 2010 Coupe de l'Outre-Mer | Li Fung Kuee | — | |
| 189 | 26 September 2010 | Stade Henri-Longuet, Viry-Châtillon (N) | Guadeloupe | 1–1 (4–2p) | 2010 Coupe de l'Outre-Mer | L. Tehau | — | |
| 190 | 29 September 2010 | Stade Langrenay, Longjumeau (N) | New Caledonia | 1–1 (5–3p) | 2010 Coupe de l'Outre-Mer | Williams | — | |
| 191 | 3 April 2011 | Stade Pater Te Hono Nui, Pirae (H) | New Caledonia | 1–3 | Friendly | Unknown | — | |
| 192 | 6 April 2011 | Stade de Paea, Paea (H) | New Caledonia | 1–0 | Friendly | Unknown | — | |
| 193 | 27 August 2011 | Stade Boewa, Boulari Bay (N) | Fiji | 0–3 | 2011 Pacific Games | | — | |
| 194 | 30 August 2011 | Stade Boewa, Boulari Bay (N) | Cook Islands | 7–0 | 2011 Pacific Games | Neuffer, Atani, Funnell (o.g.), Chong Hue (2), Poroiae (2) | — | |
| 195 | 1 September 2011 | Stade Boewa, Boulari Bay (N) | Papua New Guinea | 1–1 | 2011 Pacific Games | Atani | — | |
| 196 | 5 September 2011 | Stade Boewa, Boulari Bay (N) | Kiribati | 17–1 | 2011 Pacific Games | Poroiae (2), Chong Hue (4), Arañeda, Mataitai, Ludivion, T. Tehau (6), Faatiarau, Atani | — | |
| 197 | 7 September 2011 | Stade Yoshida, Koné (N) | New Caledonia | 1–3 (a.e.t.) | 2011 Pacific Games | Poroiae | — | |
| 198 | 9 September 2011 | Stade Boewa, Boulari Bay (N) | Fiji | 2–1 | 2011 Pacific Games | Atani, L. Tehau | — | |
| 199 | 1 June 2012 | Lawson Tama Stadium, Honiara (N) | Samoa | 10–1 | 2012 OFC Nations Cup | L. Tehau (4), J. Tehau (2), A. Tehau (2), T. Tehau, Chong Hue | 3,000 | |
| 200 | 3 June 2012 | Lawson Tama Stadium, Honiara (N) | New Caledonia | 4–3 | 2012 OFC Nations Cup | A. Tehau, Vallar, L. Tehau, Degage | 3,500 | |
| 201 | 5 June 2012 | Lawson Tama Stadium, Honiara (N) | Vanuatu | 4–1 | 2012 OFC Nations Cup | Vallar, J. Tehau, A. Tehau, T. Tehau | 1,000 | |
| 202 | 8 June 2012 | Lawson Tama Stadium, Honiara (N) | Solomon Islands | 1–0 | 2012 OFC Nations Cup | J. Tehau | 15,000 | |
| 203 | 10 June 2012 | Lawson Tama Stadium, Honiara (N) | New Caledonia | 1–0 | 2012 OFC Nations Cup | Chong Hue | 10,000 | |
| 204 | 9 September 2012 | Lawson Tama Stadium, Honiara (A) | Solomon Islands | 0–2 | 2014 FIFA World Cup qualification | | 22,000 | |
| 205 | 12 September 2012 | Stade Pater Te Hono Nui, Pirae (H) | New Caledonia | 0–4 | 2014 FIFA World Cup qualification | | 574 | |
| 206 | 22 September 2012 | Stade Jean-Bouin, Issy-les-Moulineaux (N) | Mayotte | 1–3 | 2012 Coupe de l'Outre-Mer | Degage | — | |
| 207 | 24 September 2012 | Complexe Sportif Léo Lagrange, Corbeil-Essonnes (N) | Martinique | 3–2 | 2012 Coupe de l'Outre-Mer | A. Tehau (2), Atani | 700 | |
| 208 | 26 September 2012 | Stade Jean Rolland, Franconville (N) | New Caledonia | 1–0 | 2012 Coupe de l'Outre-Mer | Chong Hue | 200 | |
| 209 | 28 September 2012 | Clairefontaine, Clairefontaine-en-Yvelines (N) | French Guiana | 1–2 | 2012 Coupe de l'Outre-Mer | Vallar | 100 | |
| 210 | 12 October 2012 | Stade Pater Te Hono Nui, Pirae (H) | New Zealand | 0–2 | 2014 FIFA World Cup qualification | | 600 | |
| 211 | 16 October 2012 | Rugby League Park, Christchurch (A) | New Zealand | 0–3 | 2014 FIFA World Cup qualification | | 10,751 | |
| 212 | 22 March 2013 | Stade Pater Te Hono Nui, Pirae (H) | Solomon Islands | 2–0 | 2014 FIFA World Cup qualification | Bourebare, Hnanyine | 550 | |
| 213 | 26 March 2013 | Stade Numa-Daly Magenta, Nouméa (A) | New Caledonia | 0–1 | 2014 FIFA World Cup qualification | | 1,000 | |
| 214 | 17 June 2013 | Mineirão, Belo Horizonte (N) | Nigeria | 1–6 | 2013 FIFA Confederations Cup | J. Tehau | 20,187 | |
| 215 | 20 June 2013 | Estádio do Maracanã, Rio de Janeiro (N) | Spain | 0–10 | 2013 FIFA Confederations Cup | | 71,806 | |
| 216 | 23 June 2013 | Arena Pernambuco, Recife (N) | Uruguay | 0–8 | 2013 FIFA Confederations Cup | | 22,047 | |
| 217 | 29 May 2016 | Sir John Guise Stadium, Port Moresby (N) | Samoa | 4–0 | 2016 OFC Nations Cup | T. Tehau (2), Chong Hue, A. Tehau | 4,720 | |
| 218 | 1 June 2016 | Sir John Guise Stadium, Port Moresby (N) | Papua New Guinea | 2–2 | 2016 OFC Nations Cup | A. Tehau, T. Tehau | 1,643 | |
| 219 | 5 June 2016 | Sir John Guise Stadium, Port Moresby (N) | New Caledonia | 1–1 | 2016 OFC Nations Cup | T. Tehau | 3,158 | |
| 220 | 7 November 2016 | Stade Pater Te Hono Nui, Pirae (H) | Solomon Islands | 3–0 | 2018 FIFA World Cup qualification | Keck | 2,200 | |
| 221 | 13 November 2016 | Lawson Tama Stadium, Honiara (A) | Solomon Islands | 0–1 | 2018 FIFA World Cup qualification | | 5,000 | |
| 222 | 23 March 2017 | Sir John Guise Stadium, Port Moresby (A) | Papua New Guinea | 3–1 | 2018 FIFA World Cup qualification | Graglia (2), T. Tehau | 4,209 | |
| 223 | 28 March 2017 | Stade Pater Te Hono Nui, Pirae (H) | Papua New Guinea | 1–2 | 2018 FIFA World Cup qualification | Keck | 5,000 | |
| 224 | 21 March 2018 | Stade Pater Te Hono Nui, Pirae (H) | New Caledonia | 0–0 | Friendly | | 2,000 | |
| 225 | 23 March 2018 | Stade Pater Te Hono Nui, Pirae (H) | New Caledonia | 4–3 | Friendly | Li Fung Kuee, T. Tehau (3) | — | |
| 226 | 4 June 2019 | Korman Stadium, Port Vila (A) | Vanuatu | 0–2 | Friendly | | — | |
| 227 | 7 June 2019 | Korman Stadium, Port Vila (N) | Fiji | 1–1 | Friendly | Tao | — | |
| 228 | 8 July 2019 | National Soccer Stadium, Apia (N) | Fiji | 1–2 | 2019 Pacific Games | Mu | 500 | |
| 229 | 10 July 2019 | National Soccer Stadium, Apia (N) | Tuvalu | 7–0 | 2019 Pacific Games | T. Tehau (3), Atani, Tetauira, Barbe, Tehuritaua | 150 | |
| 230 | 12 July 2019 | National Soccer Stadium, Apia (N) | Solomon Islands | 3–0 | 2019 Pacific Games | Tetauira, T. Tehau (2) | 200 | |
| 231 | 15 July 2019 | National Soccer Stadium, Apia (N) | New Caledonia | 0–3 | 2019 Pacific Games | | 1,000 | |
| 232 | 18 July 2019 | National Soccer Stadium, Apia (N) | American Samoa | 8–1 | 2019 Pacific Games | T. Tehau (3), Tetauira (3), Roo, Mu | 140 | |
| — | 17 March 2022 | Al Arabi Stadium, Doha (N) | Vanuatu | – | 2022 FIFA World Cup qualification | | — | |
| — | 20 March 2022 | Al Arabi Stadium, Doha (N) | Cook Islands | – | 2022 FIFA World Cup qualification | | — | |
| 233 | 24 March 2022 | Al Arabi Stadium, Doha (N) | Solomon Islands | 1–3 | 2022 FIFA World Cup qualification | A. Tehau | — | |
| 234 | 27 March 2022 | Al Arabi Stadium, Doha (N) | New Zealand | 0–1 | 2022 FIFA World Cup qualification | | — | |
| 235 | 20 March 2023 | Stade Pater Te Hono Nui, Pirae (H) | New Caledonia | 0–2 | Friendly | | — | |
| 236 | 23 March 2023 | Stade Pater Te Hono Nui, Pirae (H) | New Caledonia | 2–1 | Friendly | Tinirauarii (2) | — | |
| 237 | 28 August 2023 | Stade Pater Te Hono Nui, Pirae (H) | Cook Islands | 9–1 | Friendly | Tau, Kaspard, Tehau, Horoi, Paama, Keck (3), Gitton | — | |
| 238 | 31 August 2023 | Stade Pater Te Hono Nui, Pirae (H) | Cook Islands | 3–0 | Friendly | Keck, Kaspard, Morgant | — | |
| 239 | 21 November 2023 | SIFF Academy Field, Honiara (N) | Fiji | 0–0 | 2023 Pacific Games | | — | |
| 240 | 24 November 2023 | SIFF Academy Field, Honiara (N) | Northern Mariana Islands | 5–0 | 2023 Pacific Games | T. Tehau (2), Tinirauarii, Degrumelle, Kaspard | — | |
| 241 | 27 November 2023 | SIFF Academy Field, Honiara (N) | Samoa | 2–1 | 2023 Pacific Games | Tinirauarii, Lossec | — | |
| 242 | 30 November 2023 | SIFF Academy Field, Honiara (N) | Papua New Guinea | 2–0 | 2023 Pacific Games | Tinirauarii, T.Tehau | — | |
| 243 | 16 June 2024 | National Stadium, Suva (N) | Samoa | 2–0 | 2024 OFC Nations Cup | Degrumelle, T. Tehau | 500 | |
| 244 | 19 June 2024 | National Stadium, Suva (N) | Papua New Guinea | 1–1 | 2024 OFC Nations Cup | Degrumelle | 500 | |
| 245 | 22 June 2024 | National Stadium, Suva (N) | Fiji | 0–1 | 2024 OFC Nations Cup | | 1,500 | |
| 246 | 27 June 2024 | VFF Freshwater Stadium, Port Vila (N) | New Zealand | 0–5 | 2024 OFC Nations Cup | | 2,000 | |
| 247 | 30 June 2024 | VFF Freshwater Stadium, Port Vila (N) | Fiji | 2–1 | 2024 OFC Nations Cup | T. Tehau (2) | 3,000 | |
| 248 | 11 October 2024 | VFF Freshwater Stadium, Port Vila (N) | New Zealand | 0–3 | 2026 FIFA World Cup qualification | | 1,000 | |
| 249 | 15 November 2024 | Waikato Stadium, Hamilton (N) | Samoa | 3–0 | 2026 FIFA World Cup qualification | Kaspard, Mathon, T. Tehau | 638 | |
| 250 | 18 November 2024 | Mount Smart Stadium, Auckland (N) | Vanuatu | 2–0 | 2026 FIFA World Cup qualification | Spokeyjack (o.g.), Mathon | 395 | |
| 251 | 21 March 2025 | Wellington Regional Stadium, Wellington (N) | New Caledonia | 0–3 | 2026 FIFA World Cup qualification | | 1,948 | |

Notes

1. A: The 2000 Polynesia Cup doubled as qualifiers for the 2000 OFC Nations Cup.
2. B: The first round of Oceanian qualifiers for the 2006 FIFA World Cup doubled as qualifiers for the 2004 OFC Nations Cup.
3. C: The 2004 OFC Nations Cup group stage doubled as the second round of qualifiers for the 2006 FIFA World Cup.
4. D: The men's football tournament at the 2007 South Pacific Games doubled as qualifiers for the 2008 OFC Nations Cup and the first round of qualifiers for the 2010 FIFA World Cup.
5. E: The 2012 OFC Nations Cup doubled as the second round of qualifiers for the 2014 FIFA World Cup.
6. F: The 2016 OFC Nations Cup doubled as the second round of qualifiers for the 2018 FIFA World Cup.
7. G: FIFA awarded Tahiti a 3–0 win as a result of the Solomon Islands fielding the ineligible player Henry Fa'arodo, after Tahiti had defeated the Solomon Islands 1–0. Henry Fa'arodo failed to serve a one-game ban after receiving two yellow cards in the 2016 OFC Nations Cup.
8. H: Tahiti's matches against Vanuatu and the Cook Islands during qualifying for the 2022 FIFA World Cup were cancelled due to outbreaks of COVID-19 among the Vanuatu and Cook Islands' squads.

== Record by opponent ==
| Team | Pld | W | D | L | GF | GA | GD | WPCT |
|---|---|---|---|---|---|---|---|---|
| American Samoa | 2 | 2 | 0 | 0 | 26 | 1 | +25 | 100.00 |
| Australia | 2 | 0 | 0 | 2 | 1 | 11 | −10 | 0.00 |
| Cook Islands | 7 | 7 | 0 | 0 | 30 | 1 | +29 | 100.00 |
| Fiji | 10 | 2 | 3 | 5 | 7 | 15 | −8 | 20.00 |
| French Guiana | 1 | 0 | 0 | 1 | 1 | 2 | −1 | 0.00 |
| Guadeloupe | 2 | 0 | 1 | 1 | 1 | 2 | −1 | 0.00 |
| Kiribati | 1 | 1 | 0 | 0 | 17 | 1 | +16 | 100.00 |
| Martinique | 3 | 1 | 0 | 2 | 4 | 7 | −3 | 33.33 |
| Mayotte | 1 | 0 | 0 | 1 | 1 | 3 | −2 | 0.00 |
| Federated States of Micronesia | 1 | 1 | 0 | 0 | 17 | 0 | +17 | 100.00 |
| New Caledonia | 20 | 6 | 4 | 10 | 17 | 34 | −17 | 30.00 |
| New Zealand | 9 | 0 | 0 | 9 | 0 | 35 | −35 | 0.00 |
| Nigeria | 1 | 0 | 0 | 1 | 1 | 6 | −5 | 0.00 |
| Northern Mariana Islands | 1 | 1 | 0 | 0 | 5 | 0 | +5 | 100.00 |
| Papua New Guinea | 8 | 4 | 3 | 1 | 16 | 8 | +8 | 50.00 |
| Samoa | 6 | 6 | 0 | 0 | 23 | 2 | +21 | 100.00 |
| Solomon Islands | 11 | 6 | 1 | 4 | 16 | 13 | +3 | 54.55 |
| Spain | 1 | 0 | 0 | 1 | 0 | 10 | −10 | 0.00 |
| Tonga | 3 | 3 | 0 | 0 | 14 | 1 | +13 | 100.00 |
| Tuvalu | 2 | 1 | 1 | 0 | 8 | 1 | +7 | 50.00 |
| Uruguay | 1 | 0 | 0 | 1 | 0 | 8 | −8 | 0.00 |
| Vanuatu | 8 | 5 | 0 | 3 | 17 | 9 | +8 | 62.50 |
| Total | 101 | 46 | 13 | 42 | 222 | 170 | +52 | 45.54 |

Source: Results
