= 2011 in Fijian football =

The 2011 season is the 87th season of competitive football in Fiji.

== National teams ==
The home team or the team that is designated as the home team is listed in the left column the away team is in the right column.

Win Draw Loss

=== Senior ===
==== Friendly matches ====
13 July 2011	Fiji	2–0	Vanuatu	Labasa, Fiji
19:00 UTC+12	Bolaitoga 13'; Naqeleca 90'	Report		Stadium: Subrail Park; Attendance: 3,000

15 July 2011	Fiji	1–2	Vanuatu	Lautoka, Fiji
19:00 UTC+12	Avinesh 46'	Report	August 7'; Tasso 21'	Stadium: Churchill Park, Fiji

16 August 2011	Fiji	3–0	Samoa	Navua, Fiji
13:00 UTC+12	Krishna 29'; Kainihewe 33'; Dau 88'	Report		Stadium: Thomson Park

18 August 2011	Fiji	5–1	Samoa	Suva, Fiji
16:00 UTC+12	Krishna 2', 38', 51'; Tiwa 61', 73'	Report	Bell 53'	Stadium: TFL National Stadium

==== 2011 Pacific Games ====
27 August 2011 Group B	Fiji	3–0	Tahiti	Boulari, New Caledonia
15:00 UTC+11	Waqa 28'; Marmouyet 44' (o.g.); Rokotakala 86'	Report		Stadium: Stade Boewa; Referee: Chris Kerr (New Zealand)

30 August 2011 Group B	Fiji	9–0	Kiribati	Boulari, New Caledonia
10:00 UTC+11	Krishna 17' (pen.), 56', 86'; Suwamy 47'; Avinesh 52'; Dunadamu 63', 72'; Kamta 90+1' (o.g.); Manuca 90+2'	Report		Stadium: Stade Boewa; Referee: Isidore Assiene-Ambassa (New Caledonia)

3 September 2011 Group B	Cook Islands	1–4	Fiji	Boulari, New Caledonia
15:00 UTC+11	Ngauora 41'	Report	Krishna 24'; Kainihewe 35'; Dunadamu 57' (pen.); Suwamy 69'	Stadium: Stade Boewa; Referee: Isidore Assiene-Ambassa (New Caledonia)

5 September 2011 Group B	Papua New Guinea	0–2	Fiji	Boulari, New Caledonia
15:00 UTC+11		Report	Suwamy 37'; Kainihewe 45+1'	Stadium: Stade Boewa; Referee: Bertrand Billon (New Caledonia)

7 September 2011 Semifinals	Fiji	1–2 (a.e.t.)	Solomon Islands	Lifou, New Caledonia
15:00 UTC+11	Dunadamu 69'	Report	Nawo 77'; Fa'arodo 93' (pen.)	Stadium: Stade Hnassé; Referee: Averii Jacques (Tahiti)

9 September 2011 Third place game	Tahiti	2–1	Fiji	Boulari, New Caledonia
15:00 UTC+11	Atani 5'; Tehau 65'	Report	Avinesh 58'	Stadium: Stade Boewa; Referee: Bertrand Billon (New Caledonia)

=== Under-20 ===
==== 2011 OFC U-20 Championship ====
21 April 2011 Group A	Fiji U-20	0–0	Papua New Guinea U-20	Auckland, New Zealand
15:30 UTC+12		Report		Stadium: Centre Park; Attendance: 1,300

23 April 2011 Group A	Fiji U-20	0–2	Vanuatu U-20	Auckland, New Zealand
10:30 UTC+12		Report	Kalip 20'; Kaltak 82'	Stadium: Centre Park; Attendance: 1,500

25 April 2011 Group A	Fiji U-20	5–1	American Samoa U-20	Auckland, New Zealand
13:00 UTC+12	Ratu 39'; Salauneune 40', 48', 64'; Vukica 53'	Report	Herrera 84'	Stadium: Centre Park; Attendance: 800

27 April 2011 Semifinals	New Zealand U-20	6–0	Fiji U-20	Albany, New Zealand
14:45 UTC+12	Sole 12'; Galbraith 36'; Lucas 40'; Chettleburgh 61'; Bevin 79'; Cain 89'	Report		Stadium: North Harbour Stadium; Attendance: 2,000

29 April 2011 Third Place Match	Vanuatu U-20	2–0	Fiji U-20	Albany, New Zealand
13:00 UTC+12	Kaltak 15', 45+1'	Report		Stadium: North Harbour Stadium; Attendance: 1,500

=== Under-17 ===
==== 2011 OFC U-17 Championship ====
8 January 2011 Group A	American Samoa U-17	0–9	Fiji U-17	Albany, New Zealand
13:30 UTC+12		Report	Rao 41', 78'; Verevou 45+2'; Sahib 68'; Naidu 73'; Kumar 87'; Hussain 89', 90+1'; Vaeao 90+3' (o.g.)	Stadium: North Harbour Stadium

10 January 2011 Group A	Papua New Guinea U-17	2–1	Fiji U-17	Albany, New Zealand
13:30 UTC+12	Komolong 35'; Sabua 52'	Report	Sahib 21'	Stadium: North Harbour Stadium

12 January 2011 Group A	New Zealand U-17	1–0	Fiji U-17	Albany, New Zealand
13:30 UTC+12	Vale 49'	Report		Stadium: North Harbour Stadium

14 January 2011 Group A	Fiji U-17	0–3	Vanuatu U-17	Albany, New Zealand
16:00 UTC+12		Report	J. Kaltak 53', 76'; Mahit 85'	Stadium: North Harbour Stadium

== National Football League ==
=== Table ===
Pos	Team	Pld	W	D	L	GF	GA	GD	Pts	Qualification or relegation
1	Ba	20	16	1	3	58	10	+48	49	2012–13 OFC Champions League
2	Labasa	20	13	3	4	32	18	+14	42	
3	Lautoka	20	13	1	6	47	24	+23	40	
4	Navua	20	11	5	4	30	15	+15	38	
5	Rewa	20	8	6	6	25	27	−2	30	
6	Suva	20	9	1	10	23	27	−4	28	
7	Savusavu	20	7	3	10	15	25	−10	24	
8	Nadi	20	6	5	9	18	31	−13	23	
9	Tavua	20	5	2	13	25	31	−6	17	
10	Nadroga	20	3	3	14	15	47	−32	12	Relegation
11	Fiji U-23	20	4	0	16	18	51	−33	12	Relegation

Updated to match(es) played on November 26, 2011. Source: NFL Standings
Rules for classification: 1) points; 2) goal difference; 3) number of goals scored.

== Fijian clubs in international competitions ==
Club	Competition	Final round
Lautoka	2010–11 OFC Champions League	Group Stage
Ba	2011–12 OFC Champions League	

=== Lautoka F.C. ===
15 January 2011 Champions League Group A	Lautoka (Fiji)	0–0	(Papua New Guinea) Hekari United	Lautoka, Fiji
15:00 UTC+13		Report		Stadium: Churchill Park; Referee: Peter O'Leary (New Zealand)

5 February 2011 Champions League Group A	Lautoka (Fiji)	1–6	(Solomon Islands) Koloale	Lautoka, Fiji
15:00 UTC+13	Nawatu 10'	Report	Bule 19' (pen.); Suri 25'; Totori 28', 62', 77' (pen.); Sale 52'	Stadium: Churchill Park; Referee: Michael Hester (New Zealand)

26 February 2011 Champions League Group A	Amicale (Vanuatu)	5–1	(Fiji) Lautoka	Port Vila, Vanuatu
15:00 UTC+11	Masauvakalo 7', 45+2', 89'; Maemae 29'; Wetney 33'	Report	Avinesh 68' (pen.)	Stadium: Port Vila Municipal Stadium; Referee: Mirko Benischke (New Zealand)

19 March 2011 Champions League Group A	Hekari United (Papua New Guinea)	1–1	(Fiji) Lautoka	Port Moresby, Papua New Guinea
15:00 UTC+10	Stefano 90+5'	Report	Finau 38'	Stadium: PMRL Stadium; Referee: John Saohu (Solomon Islands)

=== Ba F.C. ===
30 October 2011 Group A	Ba (Fiji)	2–1	(New Caledonia) Mont-Dore	Ba, Fiji
15:00 UTC+13	Swamy 63', 82'	Report	Hmaé 35'	Stadium: Govind Park; Attendance: 1,500; Referee: Chris Kerr (New Caledonia) (New Zealand)

20 November 2011 Group A	Waitakere United (New Zealand)	4–0	(Fiji) Ba	West Auckland, New Zealand
15:00 UTC+13	Vesikula 56' (o.g.); McKenzie 61'; Bale 71'; Lovemore 90+4'	Report		Stadium: Fred Taylor Park; Attendance: 4,000; Referee: Norbert Hauata (Tahiti)

2 December 2011 Group A	Tefana (French Polynesia)	4–1	(Fiji) Ba	Faaa, Tahiti
19:30 UTC-10	Marmouyet 21' (pen.); Degage 38', 77'; Williams 86'	Report	Vesikula 58' (pen.)	Stadium: Stade Louis Ganivet; Attendance: 117; Referee: Nick Waldron (New Zealand)
