= Nathaniel Lepani =

Footballer

Personal information
- Date of birth: 20 January 1982 (age 44)
- Place of birth: Port Moresby, Papua New Guinea
- Height: 5 ft 9 in (1.75 m)
- Position: Forward

Youth career
- 1991–1994: Overijse Voetbal Club

Senior career*
Years	Team	Apps	(Gls)
2001–2002	Cosmos Port Moresby		
2002–2003	Menlo Oaks		
2005	Brisbane City FC		(1)
2006	Taringa Rovers FC		
2007–2008	Lindfield FC		
2009–2011	Eastern Stars FC	14	(6)
2011–2012	Gigira Laitepo Morobe	19	(4)
2013	Edge Hill United	4	(4)
2013	Panamex FC		

International career
2001	Papua New Guinea U20	4	(2)
2004–?	Papua New Guinea	12	(9)
- * Club domestic league appearances and goals

Nathaniel Lepani (born 20 January 1982) is a former footballer from Papua New Guinea who played as a forward. He represented Papua New Guinea national football team at international level on 12 occasions. Lepani also played for Menlo Oaks in the US as well as several other clubs in Australia and Papua New Guinea.

== Early life ==
Born in Port Moresby in January 1982, Lepani moved to Hawaii as a young child, due to his father, a diplomat, being posted there for work. Nathaniel moved to Belgium with his family in 1991 when his father became Papua New Guinea's Ambassador to Belgium.

== Club career ==
Lepani began his career in 2000–01 with Cosmos Port Moresby, a team based in the capital of his home country. In May 2001 he went on trial with Italian outfit Brescia Calcio, training with the club's primavera youth squad. He lasted for the maximum trial period of a month, and was one of two Papua New Guineans to be selected for trial (the other being Alex Davani) but neither player was awarded a permanent contract. In 2002 the midfielder moved to the United States of America to study at Menlo College in California, playing for the college's team the Menlo Oaks at the same time. He wore the no.7 shirt for the team. Lepani scored a penalty in an 11–0 win over Bethany College in October 2002.

After playing for the Californian club in 2002–03, Nathaniel chose not to play at club level in 2004 due to Papua New Guinea national team and university commitments.

In 2005, Lepani joined Brisbane Premier League outfit Brisbane City FC. He played for the club's first–team and reserve side during his only season at Spencer Park, scoring one goal. The following year the midfielder joined Taringa Rovers of the same division, again shuttling between reserve and first–team outings.

Further work and university commitments stalled Lepani's club career until the 2007–08 season, when he joined Ku-ring-gai district side Lindfield FC. Lepani was finally able to resume a regular career at club level after returning to Papua New Guinea in 2009. He signed for mid-table top-flight club Eastern Stars FC.

Eastern Stars finished fifth in the Papua New Guinea National Soccer League in 2009–10. Lepani played more of a role in 2010–11, scoring a late penalty against PRK Hekari United on 20 November 2010 in a 3–1 defeat. Eastern Stars finished as league runners-up that season, but this didn't stop Lepani leaving the club to join Gigira Laitepo Morobe in the same league.

Lepani made his debut for Gigira Laitepo on the opening day of the 2011–12 season, in a 3–0 loss to PRK Hekari United in November 2011. He scored a penalty in a 3–2 defeat to NBS Tukoko University on 26 November 2011. The midfielder scored a free kick in a 3–1 win over Bulolo United on 4 February 2012. He left Gigira Laitepo at the end of the season.

After a spell without a club, Lepani joined up with Cairns outfit Edge Hill United in May 2013, having returned to Australia. He made his debut for the club on 2 June 2013, scoring a hat-trick in a 5–0 win over Innisfail United. On 16 June, the midfielder played in Edge Hill's 6–1 loss to Stratford Dolpins; Lepani was substituted after his team had the first of two players sent-off.

In December 2013 he won the Panamex Soccer Cup Challenge in Lae with Panamex FC, beating City United 2–1 in the final.

== International career ==
Nathaniel played for Papua New Guinea U-20 in the 2001 OFC U-20 Championship held in the Cook Islands and New Caledonia. He scored twice for the side, in the 4–0 win over Cook Islands on 17 February 2004. However, despite this win, Papua New Guinea finished bottom of their group and failed to make it to the 2001 FIFA World Youth Championship.

Lepani made his senior debut for Papua New Guinea on 14 January 2004 against the Solomon Islands in a 4–2 loss. He went on to make eight appearances that year, scoring against Fiji in a 2004 Summer Olympics qualifier on 18 January 2004, and also netting against Samoa three times over two games.

In June 2008 he was called up to Papua New Guinea's Wantok Cup 2008 squad, but his country eventually withdrew from the competition.

These eight caps remained Lepani's only appearances for the national team until he was called up for the men's football tournament at the 2011 Pacific Games in New Caledonia. He justified his inclusion in the squad by scoring Papua New Guinea's fourth goal in their 4–0 win over the Cook Islands on 27 August 2011, after coming off the bench. Nathaniel was again a used substitute in the 1–1 draw with Tahiti on 1 September 2011, coming on just eleven minutes into the game after an injury to Reg Davani. He was later substituted off the pitch after Cyril Muta's red card. Lepani scored four times in the 17–1 demolition of Kiribati on 3 September 2011, including two goals in the space of a minute. He then played in Papua New Guinea's final group match, the 2–0 loss to Fiji on 5 September 2011 that meant Papua New Guinea were sent home.

Despite his goals in the Pacific Games, Lepani was not included in Papua New Guinea's final squad for the 2012 OFC Nations Cup. Lepani later admitted he was "extremely" disappointed not to have made the squad, and revealed that a gash to his knee, which required "7 stitches and one week out from training camp" contributed to his exclusion.

== Personal life ==
Lepani attended Port Moresby International School and St Peter's College in Papua New Guinea and Menlo College, California in the United States. He then graduated from the Queensland University of Technology in 2006, after studying business. His mother is from the United States and his father is Papua New Guinean. Nathaniel's brother, Andrew Lepani, is also a footballer and played for Papua New Guinea, Cosmos Port Moresby and PRK Hekari United. His father, Charles Lepani, was a diplomat and served as Papua New Guinea's High Commissioner to Australia from 2005 to 2017; he is considered as one of the "Gang of Four" public servants who came to prominence after Papua New Guinea's independence in 1975. His grandmother is from the Trobriand Islands and still lives there. In November 2006, Nathaniel met World Cup winner Christian Karembeu at the launch of the Oceania Football Confederation's OFC Champions League 2007.

== Career statistics ==
#	Date	Venue	Opponent	Result	Competition	Goals
1	14 January 2004	Marconi Stadium, Sydney	Solomon Islands	L 4–2	2006 FIFA World Cup qualification (OFC)	
2	16 January 2004	Marconi Stadium, Sydney	Australia	L 9–0	2006 FIFA World Cup qualification (OFC)	
3	18 January 2004	Marconi Stadium, Sydney	Fiji	L 4–1	2006 FIFA World Cup qualification (OFC)	1
4	22 January 2004	Marconi Stadium, Sydney	Samoa	D 4–4	2006 FIFA World Cup qualification (OFC)	2
5	10 May 2004	Toleafoa J.S. Blatter Complex, Apia	Vanuatu	D 1–1	2006 FIFA World Cup qualification (OFC)	
6	12 May 2004	Toleafoa J.S. Blatter Complex, Apia	Fiji	L 4–2	2006 FIFA World Cup qualification (OFC)	
7	17 May 2004	Toleafoa J.S. Blatter Complex, Apia	American Samoa	W 10–0	2006 FIFA World Cup qualification	
8	19 May 2004	Toleafoa J.S. Blatter Complex, Apia	Samoa	W 4–1	2006 FIFA World Cup qualification (OFC)	1
9	27 August 2011	Stade Boewa, Boulari Bay	Cook Islands	W 4–0	2011 Pacific Games	1
10	1 September 2011	Stade Boewa, Boulari Bay	Tahiti	D 1–1	2011 Pacific Games	
11	3 September 2011	Stade Boewa, Boulari Bay	Kiribati	W 17–1	2011 Pacific Games	4
12	5 September 2011	Stade Boewa, Boulari Bay	Fiji	L 2–0	2011 Pacific Games	
