= Tehau =

Tehau is a surname. Notable people with the surname include:

- Alvin Tehau (born 1989), Tahitian footballer
- Jonathan Tehau (born 1988), Tahitian footballer
- Lorenzo Tehau (born 1989), Tahitian footballer
- Teaonui Tehau (born 1992), Tahitian footballer
