= 2019 Coupe de Calédonie =

Tournament details
- Country: New Caledonia
- Teams: 16

Final positions
- Champions: Hienghène Sport (3rd title)
- Runners-up: AS Lössi

The 2019 Coupe de Calédonie (also known as New Caledonia Cup) was the 64th edition of the national cup in New Caledonian football. AS Magenta were the defending champions.

Hienghène Sport won the title, beating AS Lössi in the final, and earned the right to represent New Caledonia in the 2019–20 Coupe de France, entering at the seventh round.

== Teams ==
Sixteen teams compete for the cup, being the ten teams of the 2019 New Caledonia Super Ligue and six teams which qualified from provincial competitions (two each from Loyalty Islands Province, North Province and South Province).

== Round of 16 ==
Games in the round of 16 took place on 14 September 2019.

14 September 2019	AS Magenta	5–0	CS Saint-Louis	Stade Numa-Daly Magenta, Nouméa
14:00 NCT

14 September 2019	AS Wetr	4–0	Essor de Maré	Stade Numa-Daly Magenta, Nouméa
17:00 NCT

14 September 2019	Tiga Sports	1–1 (a.e.t.) (3–1 p)	RC Poindimié	Stade Boewa, Boulari Bay
14:00 NCT

14 September 2019	AS Mont-Dore	1–0	JS Baco	Stade Boewa, Boulari Bay
17:00 NCT

14 September 2019	FC Dumbea	3–0	Trio Kedeigne	Stade PLGC, Nouméa
14:00 NCT

14 September 2019	Hienghène Sport	1–0	Horizon Patho	Stade de Hienghène, Hienghène
14:00 NCT

14 September 2019	ES Wacaelé	7–2	Inter Bounaca	Stade de La Roche, Maré Island
13:00 NCT

14 September 2019	SC Ne Drehu	0–1	AS Lössi	Stade Hnassé, Lifou
17:00 NCT

== Quarter-finals ==
Games in the quarter-finals took place on 21 September 2019.

21 September 2019	AS Lössi	3–1	FC Dumbea	Stade Numa-Daly Magenta, Nouméa
14:00 NCT

21 September 2019	Hienghène Sport	2–1 (a.e.t.)	AS Magenta	Stade de Hienghène, Hienghène
14:00 NCT

21 September 2019	AS Mont-Dore	1–0	ES Wacaelé	Stade Boewa, Boulari Bay
17:00 NCT

21 September 2019	Tiga Sports	4–4 (a.e.t.) (3–4 p)	AS Wetr	Stade Numa-Daly Magenta, Nouméa
17:00 NCT

== Semi-finals ==
Games in the semi-finals were played on 28 September 2019, back-to-back at Stade Numa-Daly Magenta.

28 September 2019	AS Mont-Dore	1–2	Hienghène Sport	Stade Numa-Daly Magenta, Nouméa
14:00 NCT

28 September 2019	AS Wetr	0–3	AS Lössi	Stade Numa-Daly Magenta, Nouméa
17:00 NCT

== Final ==
The final was played on 19 October 2019 at Stade Numa-Daly Magenta.

19 October 2019	Hienghène Sport	5–3	AS Lössi	Stade Numa-Daly Magenta, Nouméa
16:00 NCT
