= Gari Moka =

Papua New Guinean footballer

Personal information
- Full name: Gari Moka
- Date of birth: 16 November 1983 (age 42)
- Place of birth: Papua New Guinea
- Position: Forward

Senior career*
Years	Team	Apps	(Gls)
2006	ANZ University		
2008–2009	Eastern Stars		
2010	Monsah Blues		
2011–2013	Nunawading City		
2014	NC Civil Works Oro		

International career^{‡}
2011–2014	Papua New Guinea	5	(3)
- * Club domestic league appearances and goals as of 4 June 2018 ‡ National team caps and goals as of 8 January 2012

Gari Moka (born 16 November 1983) in Papua New Guinea is a footballer.

== Career statistics ==
=== International ===
Appearances and goals by national team and year
National team	Year	Apps	Goals
Papua New Guinea	2011	4	3
Papua New Guinea	2014	1	0
Total		5	3

Scores and results list Papua New Guinea's goal tally first, score column indicates score after each Moka goal.

List of international goals scored by Gari Moka
No.	Date	Venue	Opponent	Score	Result	Competition	Ref.
1	3 September 2011	Stade Boewa, Boulari Bay, New Caledonia	Kiribati	6–0	17–1	2011 Pacific Games	
2	3 September 2011	Stade Boewa, Boulari Bay, New Caledonia	Kiribati	7–0	17–1	2011 Pacific Games	
3	3 September 2011	Stade Boewa, Boulari Bay, New Caledonia	Kiribati	8–0	17–1	2011 Pacific Games	
