= Niel Hans =

Papua New Guinean footballer

Niel Hans (born 24 April 1988) is an international footballer for Papua New Guinea. He played in the 2012 OFC Nations Cup.

== International career ==
=== International goals ===
Scores and results list Papua New Guinea's goal tally first.

No	Date	Venue	Opponent	Score	Result	Competition
1.	27 August 2011	Stade Boewa, Boulari Bay, New Caledonia	Cook Islands	1–0	4–0	2011 Pacific Games
2.	27 August 2011	Stade Boewa, Boulari Bay, New Caledonia	Cook Islands	2–0	4–0	2011 Pacific Games
3.	3 September 2011	Stade Boewa, Boulari Bay, New Caledonia	Kiribati	5–0	17–1	2011 Pacific Games
4.	3 September 2011	Stade Boewa, Boulari Bay, New Caledonia	Kiribati	9–0	17–1	2011 Pacific Games
5.	4 June 2012	Lawson Tama Stadium, Honiara, Solomon Islands	New Zealand	1–2	1–2	2012 OFC Nations Cup
