= Dimitri Petemou =

New Caledonian footballer (born 1980)

Personal information
- Date of birth: 3 August 1980 (age 46)
- Place of birth: New Caledonia
- Position: Goalkeeper

Team information
- Current team: Thio Sport

Senior career*
Years	Team	Apps	(Gls)
2011–	Thio Sport		

International career^{‡}
2011–	New Caledonia	2	(0)
Medal record
Men's football
Representing New Caledonia
Pacific Games
Gold medal – first place	2011 New Caledonia
- * Club domestic league appearances and goals as of 25 June 2016 ‡ National team caps and goals as of 25 June 2016

Dimitri Petemou (born 3 August 1980) is a New Caledonian footballer who plays as a goalkeeper for Thio Sport in the New Caledonia Super Ligue.

== Honours ==
New Caledonia

- Pacific Games: Gold Medalist, 2011
