= Maurie Wasi =

Papua New Guinean footballer

Personal information
- Full name: Maurie Wasi
- Date of birth: 6 December 1982 (age 43)
- Place of birth: Auckland, New Zealand
- Height: 1.79 m (5 ft 10 1/2 in)
- Position: Striker

Youth career
- 2000–2001: Birkenhead United

Senior career*
Years	Team	Apps	(Gls)
2002–2003	Blue Kumuls	20	(1)
2004–2005	Unitech FC	9	(4)
2006–2009	Sobou FC	30	(10)
2009	Waikato FC	18	(3)

International career
2000–2002	Papua New Guinea U-20	10	(11)
2004	Papua New Guinea U-23	5	(5)
2002–2014	Papua New Guinea	14	(5)
- * Club domestic league appearances and goals

Maurie Wasi (born 6 December 1982 in Auckland) is a Papua New Guinean former international footballer. He worked as head coach for Western Springs AFC and Madang F.C.

== Career statistics ==
=== International ===
Appearances and goals by national team and year
National team	Year	Apps	Goals
Papua New Guinea	2002	2	2
Papua New Guinea	2003	4	0
Papua New Guinea	2004	3	2
Papua New Guinea	2011	4	1
Papua New Guinea	2014	1	0
Total		14	5

Scores and results list Papua New Guinea's goal tally first, score column indicates score after each Wasi goal.

List of international goals scored by Maurie Wasi
No.	Date	Venue	Opponent	Score	Result	Competition	Ref.
1	16 March 2002	National Soccer Stadium, Apia, Samoa	Samoa	2–0	4–1	2002 OFC Nations Cup qualification	
2	18 March 2002	National Soccer Stadium, Apia, Samoa	American Samoa	7–0	7–0	2002 OFC Nations Cup qualification	
3	10 May 2004	National Soccer Stadium, Apia, Samoa	Vanuatu	1–0	1–1	2006 FIFA World Cup qualification	
4	17 May 2004	National Soccer Stadium, Apia, Samoa	American Samoa	5–0	10–0	2006 FIFA World Cup qualification	
5	3 September 2011	Stade Boewa, Boulari Bay, New Caledonia	Kiribati	17–1	17–1	2011 Pacific Games	
