= Kaltak (surname) =

Kaltak is a surname. Notable people with the surname include:

- Brian Kaltak (born 1993), Vanuatuan footballer
- Jean Kaltak (born 1994), Vanuatuan footballer
- Michel Kaltak (born 1990), Vanuatuan footballer
