= David Muta =

Papua New Guinean footballer (born 1987)

Personal information
- Date of birth: 24 October 1987 (age 39)
- Place of birth: Kimbe, West New Britain, Papua New Guinea
- Height: 1.72 m (5 ft 8 in)
- Position: Midfielder

Team information
- Current team: Papua New Guinea (head coach)

Senior career*
Years	Team	Apps	(Gls)
2006–2008	Hekari United		
2008	Sunshine Coast		
2009–2012	Hekari United		
2012	Sunshine Coast		
2013–2016	Hekari United		
2016	Marist Fire		
2017	Hekari United		
2017–2018	Henderson Eels		
2018–2022	Hekari United		

International career^{‡}
2008	Papua New Guinea U23	5	(2)
2011–2022	Papua New Guinea	18	(1)

Managerial career
- 2025–2026: Papua New Guinea
Medal record
Men's football
Representing Papua New Guinea (as player)
OFC Nations Cup
Runner-up	2016 Papua New Guinea
Representing Papua New Guinea (as manager)
MSG Prime Minister's Cup
Winner	2024 Solomon Islands
Runner-up	2025 Papua New Guinea
- * Club domestic league appearances and goals as of 7 August 2016 ‡ National team caps and goals as of 27 March 2022

David Muta (born 24 October 1987) is a Papua New Guinean former international footballer who played as a midfielder.

== Club career ==
Muta started his playing career with Hekari United in 2006. Two years later, he joined Australian club Sunshine Coast FC and helped his side to win the Queensland State League title. On 6 December 2008, he played against LA Galaxy in an exhibition match in New Zealand, as part of an Oceania XI All-Star team.

After moving back to Papua New Guinea, Muta captained Hekari United to victory in the OFC Champions League in 2010 and guided the team to the 2010 FIFA Club World Cup in the United Arab Emirates. He played the full 90 minutes in the 3–0 defeat to Al Wahda.

== International career ==
Muta represented Papua New Guinea's under-23 team at the 2008 OFC Men's Olympic Football Tournament in Fiji, where he scored 2 goals. On 27 August 2011, Muta made his senior international debut in a 2011 Pacific Games against Cook Islands, scoring in a 4–0 victory. Muta was named as captain of Papua New Guinea for the 2016 OFC Nations Cup on home soil. He played in all games and helped his country reach the final for the first time in their history. Despite losing in the final to New Zealand, he was awarded the Golden Ball as the tournament's best player.

== International goals ==
Scores and results list Papua New Guinea's goal tally first.

#	Date	Venue	Opponent	Score	Result	Competition
1	27 August 2011	Stade Boewa, Boulari, New Caledonia	Cook Islands	3–0	4–0	2011 Pacific Games

== Honours ==
=== Player ===
Hekari United

- Papua New Guinea National Soccer League: 2006, 2007–08, 2008–09, 2009–10, 2010–11, 2011–12, 2013, 2014
- OFC Champions League: 2009–10

Sunshine Coast

- Queensland State League: 2008

Papua New Guinea

- OFC Nations Cup: runner-up, 2016

=== Coach ===
Papua New Guinea

- MSG Prime Minister's Cup: 2024; runner-up, 2025

=== Individual ===
- OFC Nations Cup Golden Ball: 2016

== See also ==
- Cyril Muta
