= Samuel Kini =

Papua New Guinean footballer

Personal information
- Full name: Samuel Kini
- Date of birth: 10 October 1987 (age 39)
- Place of birth: Mount Hagen, Papua New Guinea
- Height: 1.66 m (5 ft 5 in)
- Position: Midfielder

Team information
- Current team: Madang
- Number: 6

Senior career*
Years	Team	Apps	(Gls)
–2013	Hekari United		
2013–	Madang		

International career
2011–	Papua New Guinea	6	(3)
- * Club domestic league appearances and goals

Samuel Kini is a Papua New Guinean football player. Currently a member of Madang in the Papua New Guinea National Soccer League. He has made 5 appearances for the Papua New Guinea national football team.

== International career ==
=== International goals ===
Scores and results list Papua New Guinea's goal tally first.

No	Date	Venue	Opponent	Score	Result	Competition
1.	3 September 2011	Stade Boewa, Boulari Bay, New Caledonia	Kiribati	1–0	17–1	2011 Pacific Games
2.	3 September 2011	Stade Boewa, Boulari Bay, New Caledonia	Kiribati	15–1	17–1	2011 Pacific Games
3.	3 September 2011	Stade Boewa, Boulari Bay, New Caledonia	Kiribati	16–1	17–1	2011 Pacific Games
