= Felix Bondaluke =

Papua New Guinean footballer

Personal information
- Full name: Felix Bondaluke
- Date of birth: December 10, 1986 (age 39)
- Position: Defender

Senior career*
Years	Team	Apps	(Gls)
2008–11	Eastern Stars FC		
2011–	University Inter Port Moresby		

International career^{‡}
2011–	Papua New Guinea	2	(1)
- * Club domestic league appearances and goals ‡ National team caps and goals as of 27 January 2013

Felix Bondaluke (born December 10, 1986) is a Papua New Guinean footballer who plays as a defender.

== Career statistics ==
=== International ===
Appearances and goals by national team and year
National team	Year	Apps	Goals
Papua New Guinea	2011	2	1
Total		2	1

Scores and results list Papua New Guinea's goal tally first, score column indicates score after each Bondaluke goal.

List of international goals scored by Felix Bondaluke
No.	Date	Venue	Opponent	Score	Result	Competition	Ref.
1	3 September 2011	Stade Boewa, Boulari Bay, New Caledonia	Kiribati	14–1	17–1	2011 Pacific Games	
