= Christophe Coursimault =

French professional football manager

Personal information
- Place of birth: France

Managerial career
- Years: Team
- 2010–2012: New Caledonia
Medal record
Men's football
Representing New Caledonia (as manager)
Pacific Games
Gold medal – first place	2011 New Caledonia

Christophe Coursimault is a French professional football manager.

== Career ==
Since 2010 until 2012 he coached the New Caledonia national football team.

== Honours ==
New Caledonia

- Pacific Games: Gold Medalist, 2011
