= Taufa Neuffer =

Tahitian footballer (born 1978)

Personal information
- Full name: Taufa Neuffer
- Date of birth: 30 August 1978 (age 48)
- Place of birth: Tahiti
- Position: Center back

Senior career*
Years	Team	Apps	(Gls)
2002–2003	AS Jeunes Tahitiens		
2003–2013	AS Tefana		(17)

International career^{‡}
2004–2011	Tahiti	18	(1)
Medal record
Men's football
Representing Tahiti
Pacific Games
Bronze medal – third place	2011 New Caledonia
- * Club domestic league appearances and goals as of 14 June 2018 ‡ National team caps and goals as of 14 June 2018

Taufa Neuffer (born 30 August 1978) is a Tahitian footballer who plays as a center back for AS Tefana in the Tahiti Division Fédérale and the Tahiti national football team.

== International goals ==
#	Date	Venue	Opponent	Score	Result	Competition
1	30 August 2011	Stade Boewa, Boulari	Cook Islands	1–0	7–0	2011 Pacific Games

== Honours ==
Tahiti

- Pacific Games: Bronze Medalist, 2011
