= Maciu Dunadamu =

Fijian footballer (born 1986)

Personal information
- Full name: Maciu Samaidrawa Dunadamu
- Date of birth: 14 June 1986 (age 40)
- Place of birth: Fiji
- Position: Striker

Team information
- Current team: Suva

International career^{‡}
Years	Team	Apps	(Gls)
2010–	Fiji	6	(3)
- ‡ National team caps and goals as of 31 March 2016

Maciu Samaidrawa Dunadamu (born 14 June 1986) is a Fijian footballer, who plays for Savusavu in the Fiji Senior League.

== Club career ==
Dunadamu started his soccer career in the Labasa Sangam Primary School. After graduating, he left Labasa and joined tertiary studies in the University of the South Pacific. He played during this time for Suva F.C. In the Winter of 2006 and 2007 he returned to Labasa F.C. and won with the club the CVC AND League Title in 2007 and 2008. After his second season signed in the Spring of 2009 with Ba F.C., before joined on 6 January 2010 to Navua F.C. After just one season returned to his homeclub Labasa and played six months for them. In Summer 2011, signed than for Papua New Guinea club Hekari United. After two seasons left Hekari and returned to Fiji, to sign with his former club Ba F.C.

== International career ==
Dunadamu has played in four World Cup qualifying matches and in four OFC Nations Cups for Fiji, scoring one goal against Vanuatu.

== Career statistics ==
Appearances and goals by national team and year
National team	Year	Apps	Goals
Fiji	2007	2	0
Fiji	2008	2	2
Fiji	2011	8	4
Fiji	2012	2	1
Fiji	2015	1	0
Total		15	7

Scores and results list Fiji's goal tally first, score column indicates score after each Dunadamu goal.

List of international goals scored by Maciu Dunadamu
No.	Date	Venue	Opponent	Score	Result	Competition	Ref.
1	6 September 2008	Govind Park, Ba, Fiji	Vanuatu	2–0	2–0	2008 OFC Nations Cup	
2	10 September 2008	Port Vila Municipal Stadium, Port Vila, Vanuatu	Vanuatu	1–2	1–2	2008 OFC Nations Cup	
3	30 August 2011	Stade Boewa, Boulari Bay, New Caledonia	Kiribati	5–0	9–0	2011 Pacific Games	
4	30 August 2011	Stade Boewa, Boulari Bay, New Caledonia	Kiribati	6–0	9–0	2011 Pacific Games	
5	3 September 2011	Stade Boewa, Boulari Bay, New Caledonia	Cook Islands	3–1	4–1	2011 Pacific Games	
6	7 September 2011	Stade de Hnassé, Wé, New Caledonia	Solomon Islands	1–0	1–2	2011 Pacific Games	
7	6 June 2012	Lawson Tama Stadium, Honiara, Solomon Islands	Papua New Guinea	1–0	1–1	2012 OFC Nations Cup	
