= Georges Béaruné =

New Caledonian footballer (born 1989)

Personal information
- Full name: Georges Waimadrame Béaruné
- Date of birth: 27 July 1989 (age 37)
- Place of birth: New Caledonia
- Position: Defender

Team information
- Current team: Central Sport

Senior career*
Years	Team	Apps	(Gls)
2009–2015	Gaïtcha FCN		
2016–2017	AS Magenta		
2017–2019	Horizon Patho		
2019–	Central Sport		

International career
2011–2018	New Caledonia	20	(0)
Medal record
Men's football
Representing New Caledonia
OFC Nations Cup
Runner-up	2012 Solomon Islands
Pacific Games
Gold medal – first place	2011 New Caledonia
- * Club domestic league appearances and goals as of 15 January 2019

Georges Béaruné (born 27 July 1989) is a New Caledonian footballer who plays as a defender for AS Magenta in the New Caledonia Super Ligue.

== Career statistics ==
=== International ===
Appearances and goals by national team and year
National team	Year	Apps	Goals
New Caledonia	2011	5	0
New Caledonia	2012	3	0
New Caledonia	2013	2	0
New Caledonia	2014	–	
New Caledonia	2015	–	
New Caledonia	2016	5	0
New Caledonia	2017	1	0
New Caledonia	2018	4	0
Total		20	0

== Honours ==
New Caledonia

- OFC Nations Cup: Runner-up, 2012
- Pacific Games: Gold Medalist, 2011
