= Steevy Chong Hue =

Tahitian footballer (born 1990)

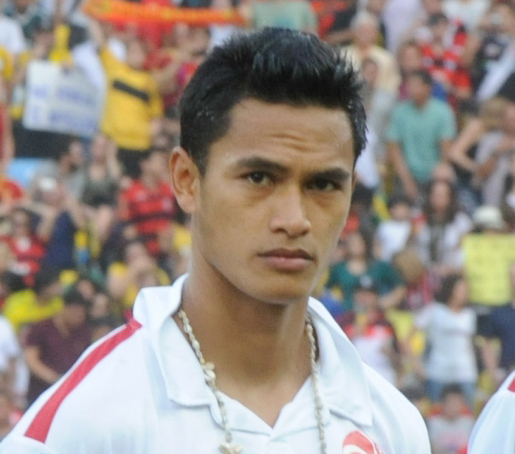
- Chong Hue with Tahiti at the 2013 FIFA Confederations Cup

Personal information
- Full name: Steevy Chong Hue
- Date of birth: 26 January 1990 (age 36)
- Place of birth: Raiatea, Tahiti
- Height: 1.79 m (5 ft 10 in)
- Position: Striker

Team information
- Current team: A.S. Tefana
- Number: 10

Senior career*
Years	Team	Apps	(Gls)
2009–2010	AS Samine		
2010–2011	AS Dragon	17	(12)
2011–2012	BX Brussels	0	(0)
2012–2013	AS Dragon		
2013–	AS Tefana		
2014	→ AS Dragon (loan)	2	(1)
2016	Blagnac FC	1	(0)

International career^{‡}
2009	Tahiti U-20	3	(0)
2010–2016	Tahiti	27	(8)
Medal record
Men's football
Representing Tahiti
OFC Nations Cup
Winner	2012 Solomon Islands
OFC U-20 Championship
Winner	2008 Tahiti
Pacific Games
Bronze medal – third place	2011 New Caledonia
- * Club domestic league appearances and goals as of 10 June 2012 ‡ National team caps and goals as of 12 June 2016

Steevy Chong Hue (Chinese: 斯蒂维·张; born 26 January 1990) is a Tahitian footballer who plays as a striker. He last played for A.S. Tefana in the Tahitian First Division.

== Background ==
Chong Hue is of Hakka Chinese ancestry from Longgang, Shenzhen, China. The area was formerly known as Bao'an in Shenzhen.

== Club career ==
Chong Hue began his career playing for AS Samine as a teenager before joining A.S. Dragon in the Tahiti First Division in 2010. In 2011, Belgian Third Division side Bleid-Gaume signed Chong Hue and compatriot Alvin Tehau, however they did not make any appearances for the club due to its economic difficulties at the time and decided to return to Tahiti. After his performance in the 2013 FIFA Confederations Cup, he earned much praise and became linked to several professional clubs.

On 26 July 2013, it was confirmed that Chong Hue had joined French Ligue 1 club FC Lorient on a 15-day trial. He played in several pre-season friendly matches for the club.

== International career ==
He has represented Tahiti at both the domestic and international level. Most notably he scored the winning goal in the 2012 OFC Nations Cup final securing the first ever international title for his country. He also took part in Tahiti's campaign in the 2013 FIFA Confederations Cup.

=== 2012 OFC Nations Cup ===
Steevy Chong Hue was selected in Tahiti's 23-man squad for the 2012 OFC Nations Cup by coach Eddy Etaeta. He scored his first international goal in Tahiti's first game of the tournament against Samoa in the 61st minute. He scored his second international goal in Tahiti's second game of the tournament against New Caledonia, scoring the winner in a 4–3 victory. On 10 June, in the final, he scored the only goal of the game on the 10th minute against New Caledonia, securing Tahiti their first ever international title and qualification for the 2013 FIFA Confederations Cup representing Oceania.

=== 2013 FIFA Confederations Cup ===
Chong Hue was included in the 23-man Tahiti squad for the 2013 FIFA Confederations Cup. He played in all three games Tahiti played against Nigeria, Spain, and Uruguay. He played well above expectations in the competition especially against Nigeria in which he several times caused problems to the opposition defence, and in particular to the Nigerian right-back Efe Ambrose of whom he often outpaced down the left flank.

=== International goals ===
As of match played 29 May 2016. Tahiti score listed first, score column indicates score after each Chong Hue goal.

International goals by date, venue, cap, opponent, score, result and competition
No.	Date	Venue	Cap	Opponent	Score	Result	Competition
1	30 August 2011	Stade Boewa, Boulari Bay, New Caledonia	6	Cook Islands	4–0	7–0	2011 Pacific Games
2	30 August 2011	Stade Boewa, Boulari Bay, New Caledonia	6	Cook Islands	7–0	7–0	2011 Pacific Games
3	5 September 2011	Stade Boewa, Boulari Bay, New Caledonia	8	Kiribati	4–0	17–1	2011 Pacific Games
4	5 September 2011	Stade Boewa, Boulari Bay, New Caledonia	8	Kiribati	5–1	17–1	2011 Pacific Games
5	5 September 2011	Stade Boewa, Boulari Bay, New Caledonia	8	Kiribati	7–1	17–1	2011 Pacific Games
6	1 June 2012	Lawson Tama Stadium, Honiara, Solomon Islands	10	Samoa	6–0	10–1	2014 FIFA World Cup qualification
7	10 June 2012	Lawson Tama Stadium, Honiara, Solomon Islands	13	New Caledonia	1–0	1–0	2012 OFC Nations Cup Final
8	29 May 2016	Sir John Guise Stadium, Port Moresby, Papua New Guinea	25	Samoa	3–0	4–0	2016 OFC Nations Cup

== Honours ==
=== Player ===
A.S. Dragon

- Tahiti First Division 2011–12, 2012–13

Tahiti

- OFC Nations Cup: 2012
- Pacific Games: Bronze Medalist, 2011

Tahiti U20

- OFC U-20 Championship: 2008

=== Individual ===
- 2011-12 Tahiti First Division Golden Boot: - 11 goals
