= Michael Fifi'i =

Solomon Islands footballer

Personal information
- Date of birth: 24 December 1987 (age 38)
- Place of birth: Solomon Islands
- Height: 1.62 m (5 ft 4 in)
- Position: Attacking midfielder

Team information
- Current team: Lupe ole Soaga

Senior career*
Years	Team	Apps	(Gls)
2007–2009	Canterbury United FC		
2009–2012	Team Wellington	23	(4)
2012–2013	Canterbury United FC	5	(0)
2013	Miramar Rangers	?	(?)
2014	Kiwi F.C.	0	(0)
2014–2016	Miramar Rangers		
2016–	Lupe ole Soaga		

International career
2011–	Solomon Islands	3	(0)
Medal record
Men's football
Representing Solomon Islands
Pacific Games
Silver medal – second place	2011 New Caledonia
- * Club domestic league appearances and goals

Michael Fifi'i (born 24 December 1987) is a Solomon Islands international footballer who began playing for the Lupe ole Soaga in 2016.

== Career ==
In 2007, he began his professional career for the Canterbury United FC. Later he played for the Team Wellington, Canterbury United FC and Miramar Rangers. Since 2014 he is a player of the Kiwi F.C.

== Honours ==
Team Wellington

- New Zealand Football Championship: runner-up 2011/2012

Kiwi F.C.

- Samoa National League: 2014

Solomon Islands

- Pacific Games: Silver Medalist, 2011
