= Cyril Muta =

Papua New Guinean footballer

Personal information
- Full name: Cyril Muta
- Date of birth: 10 October 1987 (age 39)
- Place of birth: Papua New Guinea
- Position: Defender

Senior career*
Years	Team	Apps	(Gls)
2006–2007	Morobe Kumuls		
2008–2011	PRK Hekari United		
2011	Real Kakamora		
2011-12	Eastern Stars		
2012	Sunshine Coast		
2012–2013	PRK Hekari United		
2013–2014	Tukoko University		
2014	Toti City Dwellers		

International career
2011–2014	Papua New Guinea	3	(1)
- * Club domestic league appearances and goals

Cyril Muta (born 10 October 1987) is a Papua New Guinean international footballer who plays as a defender.

== Career statistics ==
=== International ===
Appearances and goals by national team and year
National team	Year	Apps	Goals
Papua New Guinea	2011	2	1
Papua New Guinea	2014	1	0
Total		3	1

Scores and results list Papua New Guinea's goal tally first, score column indicates change after Muta's goal.

List of international goals scored by Cyril Muta
No.	Date	Venue	Opponent	Score	Result	Competition	Ref.
1	1 September 2011	Stade Boewa, Boulari Bay, New Caledonia	Tahiti	1–0	1–1	2011 Pacific Games	

== See also ==
- David Muta
