= Efraín Araneda =

Footballer (born 1978)

Personal information
- Full name: Efraín Antonio Araneda Estay
- Date of birth: 5 June 1978 (age 48)
- Place of birth: Peñalolén, Chile
- Position: Midfielder

Youth career
- Colo Colo Peñalolén
- Cobreloa
- Universidad Católica

Senior career*
Years	Team	Apps	(Gls)
1998–1999	Visé		
1999	Colchagua		
2000	Trasandino		
2001	AS Tefana		
2001	San Luis		
2001–2002	AS Tefana		
2003–2014	AS Dragon		
2014–2015	AS Pirae		
2016–2017	Central Sport		

International career
2011–2017	Tahiti	9	(1)

Managerial career
- 2016–2017: Central Sport (assistant)
- 2017–: Central Sport
Medal record
Men's football
Representing Tahiti
Pacific Games
Bronze medal – third place	2011 New Caledonia
- * Club domestic league appearances and goals

Efraín Antonio Araneda Estay (born 5 June 1978), also known as Chico, is a football manager and former player. Born in Chile, he played for the Tahiti national team at international level.

== Playing career ==
After being with the youth systems of both Cobreloa and Universidad Católica, Araneda made his professional debut abroad with Belgian club Visé. Back in Chile, he played for Colchagua and Trasandino in 1999 and 2000, respectively.

In 2001, he emigrated to French Polynesia after noticing the Chilean players David Cubillos and Antonio Flores played in that country, and joined AS Tefana. He returned to Chile to play for San Luis de Quillota between May and October of the same year. Back in Tahiti, he played for AS Tefana, AS Dragon, AS Pirae and Central Sport. In Central Sport, Araneda coincided with his compatriots Miguel Ángel Estay, César Castillo, Sergio Sandoval and Diego Cifuentes.

== Managerial career ==
After his retirement, he became the manager of Central Sport, where he had performed as both assistant coach and player.

== Personal life ==
His son Diego is a footballer who has represented Tahiti U20.

In addition to his work as a football coach, he performs as a tour guide.

== Career statistics ==
Tahiti national team
Year	Apps	Goals
2011	6	1
2012	2	0
2013	1	0
Total	9	1

#	Date	Venue	Opponent	Score	Result	Competition
1	5 September 2011	Stade Boewa, Boulari	Kiribati	3-0	17–1	2011 Pacific Games

== Honours ==
=== Player ===
AS Dragon

- Tahiti Ligue 1: 2012–13

Tahiti

- Pacific Games: Bronze Medalist, 2011

=== Manager ===
Central Sport

- Tahiti Ligue 1: 2017–18
