= Dominique Wacalie =

New Caledonian footballer (born 1982)

Personal information
- Full name: Dominique Wacalie
- Date of birth: 14 August 1982 (age 44)
- Place of birth: Lifou Island, New Caledonia
- Position: Midfielder

Youth career
- AS Centre-Nord Lifou
- AS Wetr

Senior career*
Years	Team	Apps	(Gls)
2000–2001	AS Temanava		
2001	AS Vénus		
2002	Saint-Denis FC		
2002–2003	AS Lay-Saint-Christophe		
2004–2009	FC Déolois		
2009–2011	Bourges 18		
2011–2012	SN Imphy Decize		
2012–2014	Chassieu-Décines		

International career^{‡}
2012–2014	New Caledonia	9	(0)

Managerial career
- 2017–2021: New Caledonia U-17
- 2021–2022: New Caledonia
Medal record
Men's football
Representing New Caledonia
OFC Nations Cup
Runner-up	2012 Solomon Islands
Pacific Games
Gold medal – first place	2011 New Caledonia
- * Club domestic league appearances and goals as of 31 December 2014 ‡ National team caps and goals as of 31 December 2014

Dominique Wacalie (born 14 August 1982) is a retired New Caledonian footballer who played as a midfielder. Since 2021, he managed the New Caledonia national football team.

== Honours ==
New Caledonia

- OFC Nations Cup: Runner-Up, 2012
- Pacific Games: Gold Medalist, 2011
