= Billy Mataitai =

Tahitian footballer (born 1983)

Personal information
- Full name: Billy Mataitai
- Date of birth: 20 July 1983 (age 43)
- Place of birth: Tahiti
- Position: Midfielder

Team information
- Current team: AS Manu-Ura
- Number: 20

Senior career*
Years	Team	Apps	(Gls)
2003–	AS Manu-Ura		

International career^{‡}
2004–2011	Tahiti	16	(1)
Medal record
Men's football
Representing Tahiti
Pacific Games
Bronze medal – third place	2011 New Caledonia
- * Club domestic league appearances and goals as of 13 January 2012 ‡ National team caps and goals as of 13 January 2012

Billy Mataitai (born 20 July 1983) in Tahiti is a footballer who plays as a midfielder. He currently plays for AS Manu-Ura in the Tahiti Division Fédérale and the Tahiti national football team.

== Career statistics ==
=== International ===
Appearances and goals by national team and year
National team	Year	Apps	Goals
Tahiti	2004	7	0
Tahiti	2005	–	
Tahiti	2006	–	
Tahiti	2007	3	0
Tahiti	2008	1	0
Tahiti	2009	–	
Tahiti	2010	–	
Tahiti	2011	5	1
Total		16	1

Scores and results list Tahiti's goal tally first, score column indicates score after each Mataitai goal.

List of international goals scored by Billy Mataitai
No.	Date	Venue	Opponent	Score	Result	Competition
1	5 September 2011	Stade Boewa, Boulari Bay, New Caledonia	Kiribati	8–1	17–1	2011 Pacific Games

== Honours ==
Tahiti

- Pacific Games: Bronze Medalist, 2011
