= Hiro Poroiae =

Tahitian footballer (born 1986)

Personal information
- Full name: Hiroana Poroiae
- Date of birth: 14 June 1986 (age 40)
- Place of birth: Tahiti
- Position: Midfielder

Team information
- Current team: AS Manu-Ura
- Number: 2

Senior career*
Years	Team	Apps	(Gls)
2006–	AS Manu-Ura		

International career^{‡}
2007–	Tahiti	12	(5)
Medal record
Men's football
Representing Tahiti
OFC Nations Cup
Winner	2012 Solomon Islands
Pacific Games
Bronze medal – third place	2011 New Caledonia
- * Club domestic league appearances and goals as of 13 January 2012 ‡ National team caps and goals as of 21 March 2013

Hiro Poroiae (born 14 June 1986) is a Tahitian footballer who plays as a midfielder. He currently plays for AS Manu-Ura in the Tahiti Division Fédérale and the Tahiti national football team. He made his debut for the national team on 2007 against Tuvalu.

In 2013 he was selected for the team for the Confederations Cup.

== International goals ==
#	Date	Venue	Opponent	Score	Result	Competition
1	30 August 2011	Stade Boewa, Boulari	Cook Islands	5-0	7-0	2011 Pacific Games
2	30 August 2011	Stade Boewa, Boulari	Cook Islands	6-0	7-0	2011 Pacific Games
3	5 September 2011	Stade Boewa, Boulari	Kiribati	1-0	17-1	2011 Pacific Games
4	5 September 2011	Stade Boewa, Boulari	Kiribati	6-1	17-1	2011 Pacific Games
5	7 September 2011	Stade Yoshida, Koné	New Caledonia	1-0	1-3 (a.e.t.)	2011 Pacific Games
–	24 May 2015	Stade Pater Te Hono Nui, Pirae	Argentina under-20	1–1	1-4	Friendly match

== International career statistics ==
Tahiti national team
Year	Apps	Goals
2007	3	0
2010	1	0
2011	6	5
2012	5	0
Total	15	5

== Honours ==
Tahiti

- OFC Nations Cup: 2012
- Pacific Games: Bronze Medalist, 2011
