= Alvin Avinesh =

Fijian footballer

Personal information
- Full name: Alvin Avinesh
- Date of birth: April 6, 1982 (age 44)
- Place of birth: Lautoka
- Position: Midfielder

Team information
- Current team: Lautoka

Senior career*
Years	Team	Apps	(Gls)
2004–2010	Lautoka		
2011	Labasa		
2012–	Lautoka		

International career^{‡}
2004–	Fiji	22	(3)
Medal record
Men's football
Representing Fiji
Pacific Games
Silver medal – second place	2007 Samoa
- * Club domestic league appearances and goals ‡ National team caps and goals as of 10 March 2013

Alvin Avinesh is a Fijian footballer who plays as a midfielder.

== International career ==
=== International goals ===
Scores and results list Fiji's goal tally first.

No	Date	Venue	Opponent	Score	Result	Competition
1.	15 July 2011	Churchill Park, Lautoka, Fiji	Vanuatu	1–2	1–2	Friendly
2.	30 August 2011	Stade Boewa, Boulari Bay, New Caledonia	Kiribati	3–0	9–0	2011 Pacific Games
3.	9 September 2011	Stade Boewa, Boulari Bay, New Caledonia	Tahiti	1–1	1–2	2011 Pacific Games

== Honours ==
Fiji

- Pacific Games: Silver Medalist, 2007
