= Miguel Ángel Estay =

Chilean footballer

Personal information
- Full name: Miguel Ángel Estay Peña
- Date of birth: 2 May 1991 (age 35)
- Place of birth: Santiago, Chile
- Position: Midfielder

Youth career
- 2005–2011: Deportes La Serena

Senior career*
Years	Team	Apps	(Gls)
2011–2014	Deportes La Serena	21	(3)
2012	→ Deportes Linares (loan)	–	(–)
2014–2016	Deportes Ovalle	51	(9)
2016	Provincial Ovalle	–	(–)
2017	Central Sport		
2017	Colchagua	2	(0)
- * Club domestic league appearances and goals

Miguel Ángel Estay Peña (born 2 May 1991) is a Chilean former professional footballer who played as a midfielder for clubs in Chile and Tahiti.

== Career ==
A left-footed playmaker from the Deportes La Serena youth system, where he came at the age of 14, Estay played on loan at Deportes Linares in the 2012 Chilean Tercera A. He permanently played for Deportes La Serena between 2013 and 2014.

From 2014 to 2016, he played for Deportes Ovalle in the Segunda División Profesional. In the second half of 2016, he switched to Provincial Ovalle in the same city, winning the Tercera B league title and earning promotion.

In 2017, he emigrated to French Polynesia and signed with AS Central Sport in the Tahiti Ligue 1 alongside César Castillo, after they were spotted by the President and the assistant coach and player of the team, Efraín Araneda, in Ovalle, Chile. In the squad, they coincided with his compatriots Sergio Sandoval and Diego Cifuentes, in addition to Araneda. All of them took part in the 2017 OFC Champions League, with Estay scoring against both Madang FC and Lupe o le Soaga.

Back in Chile, he played for Colchagua in the Segunda División Profesional, his last club.

== Personal life ==
Estay is a relative of the Chilean-Tahitian footballers Efraín Araneda Estay and Diego Araneda, father and son.

He went on playing football at amateur level for clubs such as Fedenort from Coquimbo.
