= Stanley Atani =

Tahitian footballer (born 1990)

Personal information
- Full name: Stanley Atani
- Date of birth: 27 January 1990 (age 36)
- Place of birth: Papeete, Tahiti
- Height: 1.76 m (5 ft 9 in)
- Position: Midfielder

Team information
- Current team: AS Vénus Mahina

Senior career*
Years	Team	Apps	(Gls)
2008–2011	AS Jeunes Tahitiens		
2011–2013	AS Tefana		
2013-2014	AS Dragon		
2014-2018	AS Tefana		
2019-	AS Vénus		

International career^{‡}
2009	Tahiti U20	1	(0)
2010–2019	Tahiti	23	(6)
Medal record
Men's football
Representing Tahiti
OFC U-20 Championship
Winner	2008 Tahiti
Pacific Games
Bronze medal – third place	2011 New Caledonia
- * Club domestic league appearances and goals ‡ National team caps and goals as of 5 July 2021

Stanley Atani (born 27 January 1990) is a Tahitian footballer who plays as a midfielder for AS Vénus Mahina and for the Tahiti national team.

== Career statistics ==
Tahiti national team
Year	Apps	Goals
2011	6	4
2012	6	1
2013	4	0
2019	7	1
Total	23	6

Scores and results list Tahiti's goal tally first.

No.	Date	Venue	Opponent	Score	Result	Competition
1.	30 August 2011	Stade Boewa, Boulari	Cook Islands	2–0	7–0	2011 Pacific Games
2.	1 September 2011	Stade Boewa, Boulari	Papua New Guinea	1–1	1–1	2011 Pacific Games
3.	5 September 2011	Stade Boewa, Boulari	Kiribati	14–1	17–1	2011 Pacific Games
4.	9 September 2011	Stade Boewa, Boulari	Fiji	1–0	2–1	2011 Pacific Games
5.	24 September 2012	Complexe Sportif Léo Lagrange, Corbeil-Essonnes	Martinique	2–1	3–2	2012 Coupe de l'Outre-Mer
6.	10 July 2019	National Soccer Stadium, Apia	Tuvalu	3–0	7–0	2019 Pacific Games

== Honours ==
Tahiti

- Pacific Games: Bronze Medalist, 2011

Tahiti U20

- OFC U-20 Championship: 2008
