= Joris Gorendiawé =

New Caledonian footballer (born 1990)

Personal information
- Full name: Joris Ipézé Gorendiawé
- Date of birth: 18 July 1990 (age 36)
- Place of birth: New Caledonia
- Height: 1.75 m (5 ft 9 in)
- Position: Midfielder

Senior career*
Years	Team	Apps	(Gls)
2009–2016	AS Magenta		

International career^{‡}
2010–2011	New Caledonia	10	(1)
Medal record
Men's football
Representing New Caledonia
Pacific Games
Gold medal – first place	2011 New Caledonia
- * Club domestic league appearances and goals as of 13 January 2012 ‡ National team caps and goals as of 13 January 2012

Joris Ipézé Gorendiawé (born 18 July 1990) in New Caledonia is a footballer who plays as a midfielder. He currently plays for AS Magenta in the New Caledonia Division Honneur and the New Caledonia national football team.

== Honours ==
New Caledonia

- Pacific Games: Gold Medalist, 2011
