= Jonathan Tehau =

Tahitian footballer (born 1988)

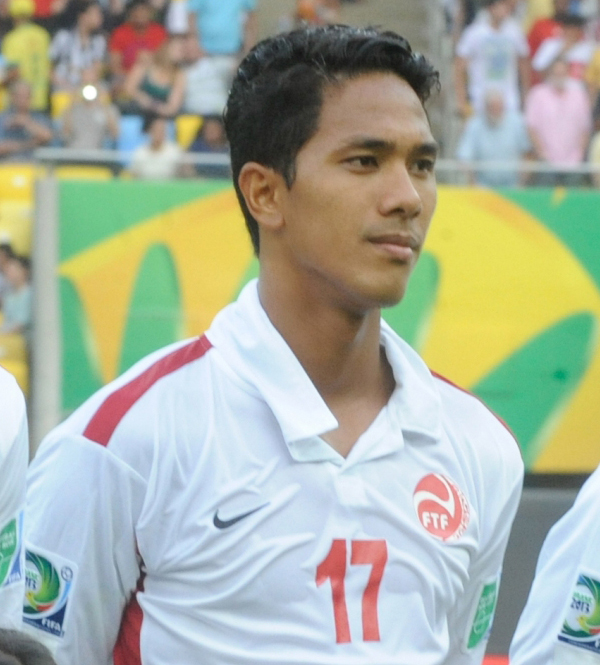
- Tehau with Tahiti at the 2013 FIFA Confederations Cup

Personal information
- Full name: Jonathan Tehau
- Date of birth: 9 January 1988 (age 38)
- Place of birth: Tahiti
- Height: 1.83 m (6 ft 0 in)
- Positions: Defender; midfielder

Team information
- Current team: Central Sport

Senior career*
Years	Team	Apps	(Gls)
2010–2012	AS Tamarii		
2012–2013	AS Tefana		
2013	AS Dragon		
2013–2018	AS Tefana		
2014	→ AS Dragon (loan)		
2018–	Central Sport		

International career
2011–2017	Tahiti	26	(5)
Medal record
Men's football
Representing Tahiti
OFC Nations Cup
Winner	2012 Solomon Islands
Pacific Games
Bronze medal – third place	2011 New Caledonia
- * Club domestic league appearances and goals

Jonathan Tehau (born 9 January 1988) is a Tahitian footballer who plays as a defender or midfielder for A.S. Central Sport. He is the brother of twins Lorenzo Tehau and Alvin Tehau and cousin of Teaonui Tehau, all playing for Tahiti national team. He made 26 appearances for the Tahiti national team scoring five goals.

== International career ==
=== 2012 OFC Nations Cup ===
Tehau was selected in the 23-man Tahiti by head coach Eddy Etaeta for the 2012 OFC Nations Cup. He featured heavily in the tournament playing mainly at centre back, he scored his first international goal against Samoa in the first group A game of the tournament, he later scored another goal in that game which eventually finished 10–1 to Tahiti and scored two more goals against Vanuatu in the final game of group A and against Solomon Islands in the semi-finals of the tournament. He also played in the final of the tournament against New Caledonia. The game finished 1–0 to Tahiti with the only goal of the game being scored by Steevy Chong Hue, thus recording the first ever victory in the OFC Nations Cup for Tahiti.

=== 2013 FIFA Confederations Cup ===
Tehau was again included in the 23-man Tahiti squad for the 2013 FIFA Confederations Cup along with his brothers Alvin Tehau, Lorenzo Tehau and cousin Teaonui Tehau. On 17 June 2013 in Tahiti's first game of the tournament against Nigeria, Jonathan Tehau scored Tahiti's first ever goal at a Confederations Cup in the 54th minute, a back post header from a corner delivered by Marama Vahirua, reducing the deficit to 3–1 and sending the Tahiti bench into raptures. Tehau also scored an own goal 15 minutes after he scored in that game that eventually finished 6–1 to Nigeria, making him the first and only person to score at both ends in Confederations Cup history. He played in Tahiti's remaining two games in the tournament against Spain and Uruguay.

== Career statistics ==
Appearances and goals by national team and year
National team	Year	Apps	Goals
Tahiti	2011	8	0
Tahiti	2012	12	4
Tahiti	2013	4	1
Tahiti	2016	1	0
Tahiti	2017	1	0
Total		26	5

Scores and results list Tahiti's goal tally first, score column indicates score after each Tehau goal.

List of international goals scored by Jonathan Tehau
No.	Date	Venue	Opponent	Score	Result	Competition
1	1 June 2012	Lawson Tama Stadium, Honiara, Solomon Islands	Samoa	2–0	10–1	2012 OFC Nations Cup
2	1 June 2012	Lawson Tama Stadium, Honiara, Solomon Islands	Samoa	7–1	10–1	2012 OFC Nations Cup
3	5 June 2012	Lawson Tama Stadium, Honiara, Solomon Islands	Vanuatu	2–0	4–1	2012 OFC Nations Cup
4	8 June 2012	Lawson Tama Stadium, Honiara, Solomon Islands	Solomon Islands	1–0	1–0	2012 OFC Nations Cup
5	17 June 2013	Mineirão, Belo Horizonte, Brazil	Nigeria	1–3	1–6	2013 FIFA Confederations Cup

== Honours ==
Tahiti

- OFC Nations Cup: 2012
- Pacific Games: Bronze Medalist, 2011
