= Thio Sport =

- Full name: Thio Sport
- Ground: Stade Edouard Pentacosta; Thio, New Caledonia
- Capacity: 1.000
- League: New Caledonia Division Honneur
- 2018: 10th
| Home colours | Away colours |

Thio Sport is a New Caledonian football team playing at the New Caledonia Division Honneur. It is based in Thio.
