= Alex Davani =

Papua New Guinean footballer

Personal information
- Full name: Alex Davani
- Date of birth: 17 August 1985 (age 41)
- Place of birth: Papua New Guinea
- Position: Midfielder

Senior career*
Years	Team	Apps	(Gls)
2002–2006	Taringa Rovers		
2007–2008	Brisbane Strikers		
2009–2011	Brisbane City		

International career^{‡}
2003	Papua New Guinea	4	(3)
- * Club domestic league appearances and goals as of 8 January 2012 ‡ National team caps and goals as of 8 January 2012

Alex Davani (born 17 August 1985) is a Papua New Guinean former professional footballer who played as a midfielder. He played for Brisbane Strikers, Taringa Rovers and Brisbane City in the Brisbane Premier League and the Papua New Guinea national football team.

Appearances and goals by national team and year
National team	Year	Apps	Goals
Papua New Guinea	2003	4	3
Total		4	3

Scores and results list Papua New Guinea's goal tally first, score column indicates score after each Davani goal.

List of international goals scored by Alex Davani
No.	Date	Venue	Opponent	Score	Result	Competition	Ref.
1	7 July 2003	Churchill Park, Lautoka, Fiji	Federated States of Micronesia	1–0	10–0	2003 South Pacific Games	
2	7 July 2003	Churchill Park, Lautoka, Fiji	Federated States of Micronesia	2–0	10–0	2003 South Pacific Games	
3	7 July 2003	Churchill Park, Lautoka, Fiji	Federated States of Micronesia	6–0	10–0	2003 South Pacific Games	
