= Tuimasi Manuca =

Fijian footballer (1985–2026)

Personal information
- Full name: Tuimasi Tavetuwai Manuca
- Date of birth: 14 May 1985
- Place of birth: Lautoka, Fiji
- Date of death: 17 April 2026 (aged 40)
- Place of death: Ba, Viti Levu, Fiji
- Height: 1.81 m (5 ft 11 in)
- Positions: Forward; midfielder

Senior career*
Years	Team	Apps	(Gls)
2005–2009	Ba FA		(10+)
2009–2011	Hekari United		
2011–2014	Ba FA		
2014	Hekari United		
2015–2017	Ba FA	2+	

International career
2008–2011	Fiji	6	(1)
- * Club domestic league appearances and goals

Tuimasi Tavetuwai Manuca (14 May 1985 – 17 April 2026) was a Fijian footballer who played as a forward. He made six appearances for the Fiji football team, scoring once.

== Club career ==
Manuca started his career at Ba FA, where he played between 2005 and 2009. He later joined Hekari United in Papua New Guinea, where he was part of their 2010 FIFA Club World Cup squad, before returning to Ba in 2011. In 2014, he rejoined Hekari United.

== International career ==
Manuca made six appearances for Fiji between 2008 and 2011, scoring one goal against Kiribati at the 2011 Pacific Games. He was also part of Fiji's squad at the 2008 OFC Nations Cup, where they finished third.

== Personal life and death ==
In March 2026, it was announced that Manuca was battling both lung and brain cancer. He died on 17 April 2026, at the age of 40.
