= Lorenzo Tehau =

French football player (born 1989)

Personal information
- Full name: Lorenzo Tehau
- Date of birth: 10 April 1989 (age 37)
- Place of birth: Tahiti
- Height: 1.76 m (5 ft 9 in)
- Positions: Forward; midfielder

Team information
- Current team: A.S. Central Sport
- Number: 23

Senior career*
Years	Team	Apps	(Gls)
2009–2017	AS Tefana		
2017–	A.S. Central Sport	2	(2)

International career^{‡}
2010	Tahiti U-20	3	(0)
2010–	Tahiti	20	(7)
Medal record
Men's football
Representing Tahiti
OFC Nations Cup
Winner	2012 Solomon Islands
OFC U-20 Championship
Winner	2008 Tahiti
Pacific Games
Bronze medal – third place	2011 New Caledonia
- * Club domestic league appearances and goals ‡ National team caps and goals as of 20:18, 23 June 2013 (UTC)

Lorenzo Tehau is a footballer from Tahiti currently playing for A.S. Central Sport as a forward or midfielder. He is the twin brother of Alvin Tehau, brother of Jonathan Tehau and cousin of Teaonui Tehau, all of them playing for Tahiti national football team.

He represented his country in the 2009 FIFA U-20 World Cup and now is a full-time member of the Tahiti national football team. He was the top goalscorer for Tahiti in the 2012 OFC Nations Cup, where his national side won the tournament for the first time.

== Career statistics ==
=== International ===
Tahiti national team
Year	Apps	Goals
2010	3	1
2011	4	1
2012	11	5
Total	18	7

=== International goals ===
#	Date	Venue	Opponent	Score	Result	Competition
1	26 September 2010	Stade Henri-Longuet, Viry-Châtillon, Essonne	Guadeloupe	1–0	1–1	2010 Coupe de l'Outre-Mer
2	9 September 2011	Stade Boewa, Boulari	Fiji	2–1	2–1	2011 Pacific Games
3	1 June 2012	Lawson Tama Stadium, Honiara	Samoa	1–0	10–1	2012 OFC Nations Cup
4	1 June 2012	Lawson Tama Stadium, Honiara	Samoa	8–1	10–1	2012 OFC Nations Cup
5	1 June 2012	Lawson Tama Stadium, Honiara	Samoa	9–1	10–1	2012 OFC Nations Cup
6	1 June 2012	Lawson Tama Stadium, Honiara	Samoa	10–1	10–1	2012 OFC Nations Cup
7	3 June 2012	Lawson Tama Stadium, Honiara	New Caledonia	3–0	4–3	2012 OFC Nations Cup

== Honours ==
AS Tefana

- Tahiti First Division: 2010, 2011
- Tahiti Cup: 2010, 2011
- OFC Champions League: Runner-up, 2012

Tahiti

- OFC Nations Cup: 2012
- Pacific Games: Bronze Medalist, 2011

Tahiti U20

- OFC U-20 Championship: 2008
