= Michel Kaltak =

Vanuatuan footballer

Michel Kaltack
Personal information
- Full name: Michel Kaltack
- Date of birth: 12 November 1990 (age 35)
- Place of birth: Vanuatu
- Position: Midfielder

Team information
- Current team: Erakor Golden Star
- Number: 3

Senior career*
Years	Team	Apps	(Gls)
2008–2011	Erakor Golden Star		
2011	Tafea		
2012	PRK Hekari United		
2012–2014	Erakor Golden Star		
2014–2015	Tafea		
2015–	Erakor Golden Star		

International career^{‡}
2007	Vanuatu U20	6	(1)
2008–	Vanuatu	16	(1)
Medal record
Men's football
Representing Vanuatu
Pacific Mini Games
Gold medal – first place	2017 Vanuatu
- * Club domestic league appearances and goals as of 12 June 2018 ‡ National team caps and goals as of 12 June 2018

Michel Kaltack (born 12 November 1990) in Vanuatu is a Vanuatuan footballer who plays as a midfielder for Erakor Golden Star and the Vanuatu national football team.

== Career ==
He played for Erakor Golden Star and for Tafea F.C. in the Vanuatu Premia Divisen, before signed with in the early of 2012 with Papua New Guinean top club PRK Hekari United. After a half year with Hekari, returned to Vanuatu and signed for his former club Erakor Golden Star, which presented currently as Captain.

== International ==
He is also part of the Vanuatu national football team.

== Honours ==
Vanuatu

- Pacific Mini Games: Gold Medalist, 2017
