= Alvin Tehau =

Tahitian footballer (born 1989)

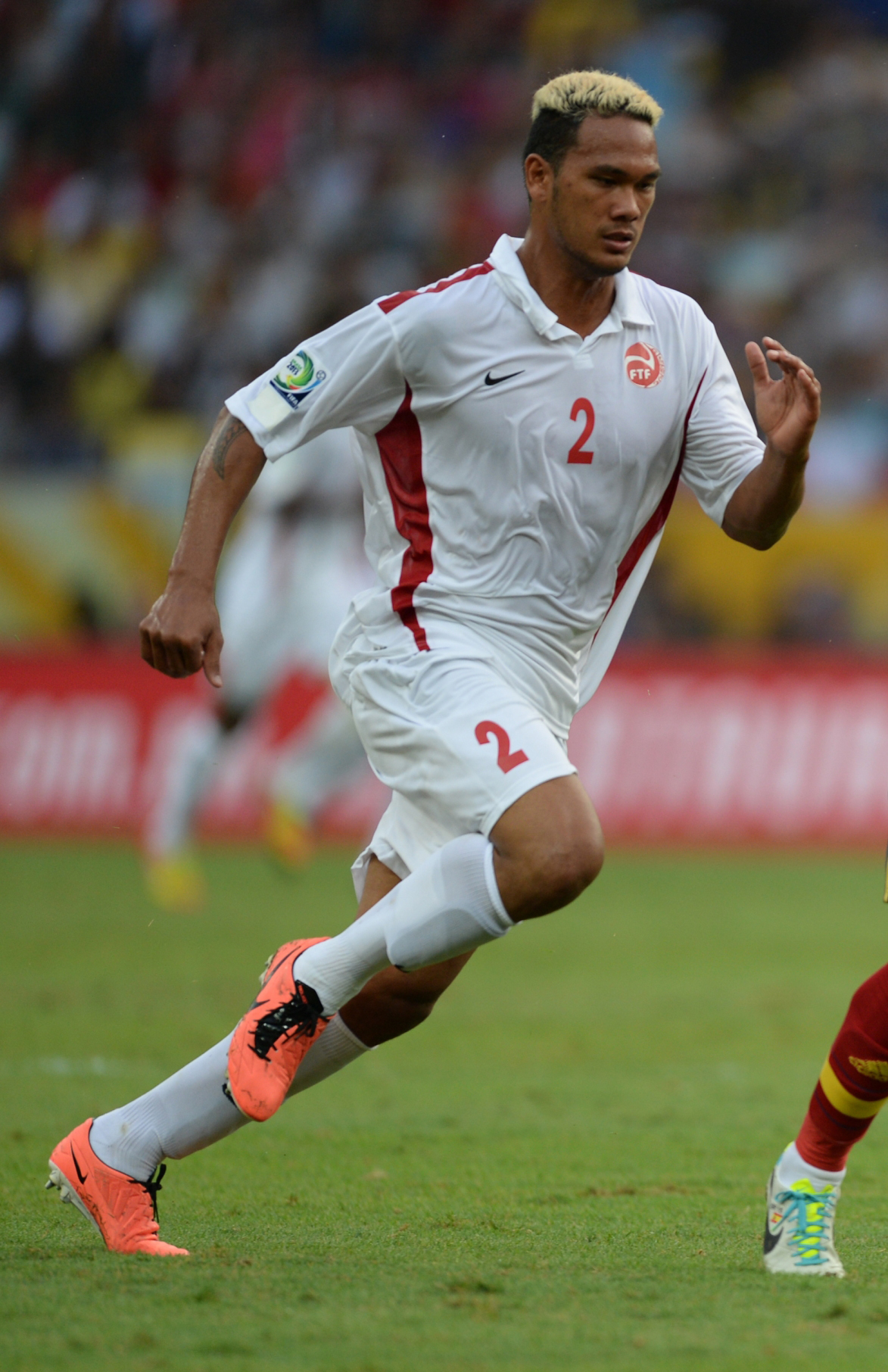
- Tehau playing for Tahiti

Personal information
- Full name: Alvin Tehau
- Date of birth: 10 April 1989 (age 37)
- Place of birth: Tahiti
- Height: 1.86 m (6 ft 1 in)
- Position: Central midfielder

Team information
- Current team: AS Tefana
- Number: 12

Senior career*
Years	Team	Apps	(Gls)
2009–2011	AS Tefana		
2011	Aceh United	16	(2)
2012–2013	AS Tefana		
2013–2014	AS Dragon		
2014–2021	AS Tefana		
2021–	AS Pirae		

International career^{‡}
2009	Tahiti U20	3	(0)
2010–	Tahiti	24	(9)
Medal record
Men's football
Representing Tahiti
OFC Nations Cup
Winner	2012 Solomon Islands
Third place	2024 Fiji/Vanuatu
OFC U-20 Championship
Winner	2008 Tahiti
- * Club domestic league appearances and goals ‡ National team caps and goals as of 27 March 2022

Alvin Tehau (born April 10, 1989) is a Tahitian professional association footballer who plays as a central midfielder for Tahiti Ligue 1 club AS Pirae and the Tahiti national team.

He is the twin brother of Lorenzo Tehau, brother of Jonathan Tehau and cousin of Teaonui Tehau, who have all played for the Tahiti national team.

== Club career ==
Tehau signed for Aceh United of the Liga Primer Indonesia in 2011, alongside former Cameroon internationals Pierre Njanka and Alain N'Kong.

== International career ==
Tehau is a full-time member of the Tahiti national team, and represented his country at the 2013 FIFA Confederations Cup.

== International goals ==
As of match played 1 June 2016. Tahiti score listed first, score column indicates score after each Tehau goal.

International goals by date, venue, cap, opponent, score, result and competition
No.	Date	Venue	Cap	Opponent	Score	Result	Competition
1	1 June 2012	Lawson Tama Stadium, Honiara, Solomon Islands	4	Samoa	3–0	10–1	2012 OFC Nations Cup
2	1 June 2012	Lawson Tama Stadium, Honiara, Solomon Islands	4	Samoa	4–0	10–1	2012 OFC Nations Cup
3	3 June 2012	Lawson Tama Stadium, Honiara, Solomon Islands	5	New Caledonia	1–0	4–3	2012 OFC Nations Cup
4	5 June 2012	Lawson Tama Stadium, Honiara, Solomon Islands	6	Vanuatu	3–0	4–1	2012 OFC Nations Cup
5	24 September 2012	Complexe Sportif Léo Lagrange, Corbeil-Essonnes, France	12	Martinique	1–1	3–2	2012 Coupe de l'Outre-Mer
6	24 September 2012	Complexe Sportif Léo Lagrange, Corbeil-Essonnes, France	12	Martinique	3–1	3–2	2012 Coupe de l'Outre-Mer
7	29 May 2016	Sir John Guise Stadium, Port Moresby, Papua New Guinea	18	Samoa	4–0	4–0	2016 OFC Nations Cup
8	1 June 2016	Sir John Guise Stadium, Port Moresby, Papua New Guinea	19	Papua New Guinea	1–2	2–2	2016 OFC Nations Cup
9	24 March 2022	Al-Arabi Stadium, Doha, Qatar	23	Solomon Islands	1–1	3–1	2022 FIFA World Cup qualification

== Honours ==
AS Tefana

- Tahiti First Division: 2010, 2011
- Tahiti Cup: 2010, 2011
- OFC Champions League: Runner-up, 2012

Tahiti

- OFC Nations Cup: 2012; 3rd place, 2024

Tahiti U20

- OFC U-20 Championship: 2008

== International career statistics ==
Tahiti national team
Year	Apps	Goals
2012	13	6
2013	2	0
2016	4	2
2017	1	0
2018	2	0
2022	2	1
Total	24	9
