= Henry Fa'arodo =

Solomon Islands footballer

Henry Fa'arodo Jr.
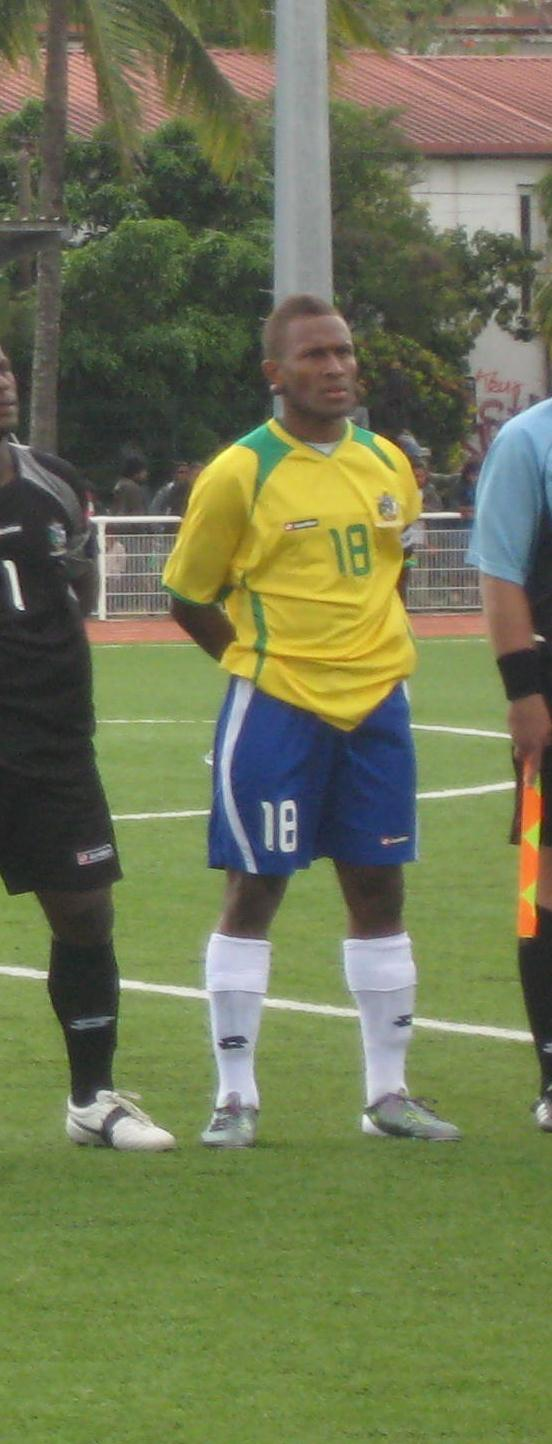

Personal information
- Full name: Henry Samuel Luito'o Fa'arodo Jr.
- Date of birth: 5 October 1982 (age 44)
- Place of birth: Honiara, Solomon Islands
- Height: 1.68 m (5 ft 6 in)
- Positions: Striker; midfielder

Senior career*
Years	Team	Apps	(Gls)
2000–2001	Nelson Suburbs	35	(11)
2002	Fawkner Blues	15	(8)
2002–2004	Melbourne Knights	33	(4)
2004	Fawkner Blues	8	(5)
2005–2006	Perth Glory	11	(0)
2006	Essendon Royals	20	(8)
2006–2007	Canterbury United	20	(7)
2007	Richmond	22	(7)
2007–2008	Auckland City	6	(0)
2008	Altona Magic	27	(7)
2009–2011	Hekari United	25	(17)
2011	Koloale FC Honiara		
2011–2012	Team Wellington	4	(3)
2012	FC Nelson	6	(7)
2012–2015	Team Wellington	29	(12)
2015–2017	Western United		
2017–2018	Marist		
2018–2019	Wellington Olympic AFC		
2019–2020	Solomon Warriors		
2020–2021	Hamilton Wanderers		
2022	Franklin United		
2023	Ngaruawahia United		

International career^{‡}
2002–2017	Solomon Islands	64	(20)

Managerial career
- 2019–2020: Solomon Warriors
- 2024–: Ellerslie AFC
Medal record
Men's football
Representing Solomon Islands
OFC Nations Cup
Runner-up	2004 Australia
Pacific Games
Silver medal – second place	2011 New Caledonia
Pacific Mini Games
Bronze medal – third place	2017 Vanuatu
- * Club domestic league appearances and goals ‡ National team caps and goals as of 15 December 2017

Henry Samuel Luito'o Fa'arodo Jr. (born 5 October 1982) is a Solomon Islands former professional footballer who played as a striker or a midfielder.

== Club career ==
Fa'arodo attended Nelson College from 2000 to 2001, playing for the school's football team as well as local club side Nelson Suburbs.

He is one of few Solomon Islanders who have played in Australian top-flight football for Perth Glory in the first A-League season and for the Melbourne Knights in the old NSL.

He joined Victorian Premier League side Altona Magic after a stint in New Zealand. In May 2010, he won the Oceania Champions League with Hekari United.

In January 2012, Fa'arodo linked up with Team Wellington in the ASB Premiership.

FC Nelson appointed Henry Fa'arodo as their junior technical advisor for the 2012 winter season and also played for the 1st team helping them to win the league.

== International career ==
He has frequently represented the Solomon Islands at international level, making his debut at the 2002 OFC Nations Cup against Tahiti. He played in 16 FIFA World Cup qualifying matches.

Henry was chosen as a starter on the Oceania All Stars team that faced the LA Galaxy on 6 December 2008 in New Zealand.

=== International goals ===
Scores and results list Solomon Islands' goal tally first.

List of international goals scored by Henry Fa'arodo
No.	Date	Venue	Opponent	Score	Result	Competition
1.	9 July 2002	North Harbour Stadium, Albany, New Zealand	New Zealand	1–4	1–6	2002 OFC Nations Cup
2.	10 May 2004	Lawson Tama Stadium, Honiara, Solomon Islands	Tonga	1–0	6–0	2006 FIFA World Cup qualification
3.	10 May 2004	Lawson Tama Stadium, Honiara, Solomon Islands	Tonga	2–0	6–0	2006 FIFA World Cup qualification
4.	10 May 2004	Lawson Tama Stadium, Honiara, Solomon Islands	Tonga	5–0	6–0	2006 FIFA World Cup qualification
5.	2 June 2004	Hindmarsh Stadium, Adelaide, Australia	Tahiti	1–0	4–0	2004 OFC Nations Cup
6.	6 September 2005	Lawson Tama Stadium, Honiara, Solomon Islands	Australia	1–1	1–2	2006 FIFA World Cup qualification
7.	25 August 2007	National Soccer Stadium, Apia, Samoa	American Samoa	5–0	12–1	2007 South Pacific Games
8.	27 August 2007	National Soccer Stadium, Apia, Samoa	Tonga	3–0	4–0	2007 South Pacific Games
9.	1 September 2007	National Soccer Stadium, Apia, Samoa	Vanuatu	2–0	2–0	2007 South Pacific Games
10.	5 September 2007	National Soccer Stadium, Apia, Samoa	New Caledonia	1–1	2–3	2007 South Pacific Games
11.	27 August 2011	Stade Rivière Salée, Nouméa, New Caledonia	Guam	1–0	7–0	2011 Pacific Games
12.	27 August 2011	Stade Rivière Salée, Nouméa, New Caledonia	Guam	2–0	7–0	2011 Pacific Games
13.	7 September 2011	Stade Hnassé, Lifou, New Caledonia	Fiji	2–1	2–1 (a.e.t.)	2011 Pacific Games
14.	7 September 2012	Lawson Tama Stadium, Honiara, Solomon Islands	Tahiti	1–0	2–0	2014 FIFA World Cup qualification
15.	11 September 2012	North Harbour Stadium, Albany, New Zealand	New Zealand	1–2	1–6	2014 FIFA World Cup qualification
16.	13 June 2017	PNG Football Stadium, Port Moresby, Papua New Guinea	Papua New Guinea	1–1	2–1	2018 FIFA World Cup qualification
17.	1 September 2017	North Harbour Stadium, Albany, New Zealand	New Zealand	1–3	1–6	2018 FIFA World Cup qualification
18.	5 September 2017	Lawson Tama Stadium, Honiara, Solomon Islands	New Zealand	2–2	2–2	2018 FIFA World Cup qualification
19.	9 December 2017	Port Vila Municipal Stadium, Port Vila, Vanuatu	Tuvalu	1–0	6–0	2017 Pacific Mini Games
20.	15 December 2017	Port Vila Municipal Stadium, Port Vila, Vanuatu	Vanuatu	2–2	2–3	2017 Pacific Mini Games

== Honours ==
=== Player ===
Hekari United

- OFC Champions League: 2009–10

Fawkner Blues

- Victorian Premier League minor premiers: 2002

Solomon Islands

- OFC Nations Cup: Runner-up, 2004
- Pacific Games: Silver Medalist, 2011
- Pacific Mini Games: Bronze Medalist, 2017

=== Individual ===
- Bill Fleming Medal: 2002
