= Football at the 2011 Pacific Games – Men's tournament =

Men's Football at the Pacific Games 2011
Tournament details
- Host country: New Caledonia
- Dates: 27 August – 9 September
- Teams: 11 (from 2 confederations)
- Venues: 5 (in 4 host cities)

Final positions
- Champions: New Caledonia (6th title)
- Runners-up: Solomon Islands
- Third place: Tahiti
- Fourth place: Fiji

Tournament statistics
- Matches played: 29
- Goals scored: 162 (5.59 per match)
- Top scorer: (New Caledonia) Bertrand Kaï (10 goals)

Football was contested as part of the programme for the 2011 Pacific Games which was hosted in Nouméa, New Caledonia from 27 August to 10 September 2011. It was the 13th edition of the men's football tournament at the multi-sport event organised by the Pacific Games Council.

The football tournament began with the first matches of the group stage on 27 August 2011 and ended with the gold medal match on 9 September 2011. Hosts and defending champions New Caledonia and the Solomon Islands contested the final. New Caledonia defeated the Solomon Islands 2–0 to win the gold medal for the sixth time. In the bronze medal match, Tahiti defeated Fiji 2–1.

The competition also marked the most recent appearance of Kiribati in the Pacific Games. The team has not played a football match of any description since their final group stage match – a 17–1 defeat to Tahiti on 5 September 2011.

== Background ==
Football had been part of the Pacific Games programme following the debut of the men's competition at the inaugural 1963 South Pacific Games in Fiji. However, football was not included in the 1999 South Pacific Games programme due to player registration differences between the South Pacific Games system and new Oceania Football Confederation (OFC) and Fédération Internationale de Football Association (FIFA) regulations.

New Caledonia and Tahiti jointly held the record for gold medals having won the football tournament five times each. New Caledonia were also the defending champions after defeating Fiji 1–0 in the gold medal match at the 2007 South Pacific Games in Samoa.

== Format ==
A total of 11 teams took part in the competition. They were drawn into two single round robin groups, one of five teams and one of six teams. The group winners and runners-up would contest the semi-finals which would decide the teams contesting the gold and bronze medal matches.

=== Participants ===
- American Samoa
- Cook Islands
- Fiji
- Guam
- Kiribati
- New Caledonia
- Papua New Guinea
- Solomon Islands
- Tahiti
- Tuvalu
- Vanuatu

== Group stage ==
=== Group A ===
New Caledonia and the Solomon Islands advanced to the semi-finals.

==== Table ====
Pos	Team	Pld	W	D	L	GF	GA	GD	Pts	Qualification
1	New Caledonia	5	4	0	1	31	2	+29	12	Semi-finals
2	Solomon Islands	5	4	0	1	18	2	+16	12	Semi-finals
3	Vanuatu	5	4	0	1	18	7	+11	12	
4	Tuvalu	5	1	1	3	7	20	−13	4	
5	Guam	5	1	1	3	4	21	−17	4	
6	American Samoa	5	0	0	5	0	26	−26	0	

==== Matches ====
27 August 2011
09:00

Tuvalu	4–0	American Samoa
Petoa 15', 90', 90+2'; Tiute 30'

Stade Rivière Salée, Nouméa
Referee: Averii Jacques (Tahiti)
27 August 2011
12:00

Solomon Islands	7–0	Guam
Fa'arodo 11', 22'; Totori 24', 41' (pen.), 89'; Nawo 72'; Paia 86'

Stade Rivière Salée, Nouméa
Referee: Rakesh Varman (Fiji)
27 August 2011
15:00

New Caledonia	5–0	Vanuatu
Gope-Fenepej 5', 31', 63'; Bako 43'; Lolohea 51'

Stade Rivière Salée, Nouméa
Referee: Andrew Achari (Fiji)

30 August 2011
09:00

Vanuatu	5–1	Tuvalu
J. Kaltack 8', 38', 45+1', 80'; Yelou 49' (pen.)		Ale 90+1'

Stade Rivière Salée, Nouméa
Referee: Rakesh Varman (Fiji)
30 August 2011
12:00

American Samoa	0–4	Solomon Islands
		Totori 8'; Bule 14'; Luwi 28', 34'

Stade Rivière Salée, Nouméa
Referee: Averii Jacques (Tahiti)
30 August 2011
15:00

Guam	0–9	New Caledonia
		Kaï 12', 26', 40', 47', 90+1'; Boawé 70'; Kabeu 73'; J. Wakanumuné 83'; Hmaé 85'

Stade Rivière Salée, Nouméa
Referee: Kader Zitouni (Tahiti)

1 September 2011
09:00

American Samoa	0–2	Guam
		Naputi 49'; Merfalen 70'

Stade Rivière Salée, Nouméa
Referee: Bruce George (Vanuatu)
1 September 2011
12:00

Tuvalu	0–8	New Caledonia
		Gorendiawé 15'; Kabeu 26', 35'; Gope-Fenepej 38'; Haeko 50'; Lolohea 61'; Hmaé 67', 85'

Stade Rivière Salée, Nouméa
Referee: Chris Kerr (New Zealand)
1 September 2011
15:00

Vanuatu	1–0	Solomon Islands
J. Kaltack 90+2'

Stade Rivière Salée, Nouméa
Referee: Kader Zitouni (Tahiti)

3 September 2011
09:00

Guam	1–4	Vanuatu
Cunliffe 14'		Tangis 50'; Tasso 53'; J. Kaltack 75'; Tari 82'

Stade Rivière Salée, Nouméa
Referee: Chris Kerr (New Zealand)
3 September 2011
12:00

Solomon Islands	6–1	Tuvalu
Totori 15', 41' (pen.); Luwi 23'; Naka 37', 46'; Faisi 90+1'		Lepaio 78'

Stade Rivière Salée, Nouméa
Referee: Averii Jacques (Tahiti)
3 September 2011
15:00

New Caledonia	8–0	American Samoa
Kaï 10', 38', 44', 66'; Haeko 50'; Qaézé 55'; Vendegou 72'; Hmaé 89'

Stade Rivière Salée, Nouméa
Referee: Rakesh Varman (Fiji)

5 September 2011
09:00

Guam	1–1	Tuvalu
Cunliffe 18' (pen.)		Stanley 24'

Stade Rivière Salée, Nouméa
Referee: Kader Zitouni (Tahiti)
5 September 2011
12:00

American Samoa	0–8	Vanuatu
		Michel 8', 22'; Garae 43'; J. Kaltack 62', 70', 78'; M. Kaltack 64'; Sese Aala 73'

Stade Rivière Salée, Nouméa
Referee: Andrew Achari (Fiji)
5 September 2011
15:00

Solomon Islands	2–1	New Caledonia
Nawo 66'; Naka 79'		Kaï 74'

Stade Rivière Salée, Nouméa
Referee: Chris Kerr (New Zealand)

=== Group B ===
Fiji and Tahiti advanced to the semi-finals.

==== Table ====
Pos	Team	Pld	W	D	L	GF	GA	GD	Pts	Qualification
1	Fiji	4	4	0	0	18	1	+17	12	Semi-finals
2	Tahiti	4	2	1	1	25	5	+20	7	Semi-finals
3	Papua New Guinea	4	2	1	1	22	4	+18	7	
4	Cook Islands	4	1	0	3	4	15	−11	3	
5	Kiribati	4	0	0	4	2	46	−44	0	

==== Matches ====
27 August 2011
10:00

Papua New Guinea	4–0	Cook Islands
Hans 18', 50'; D. Muta 55'; N. Lepani 85'

Stade Boewa, Boulari
Referee: Bertrand Billon (New Caledonia)
27 August 2011
15:00

Fiji	3–0	Tahiti
Waqa 28'; Marmouyet 44' (o.g.); Rokotakala 86'

Stade Boewa, Boulari
Referee: Chris Kerr (New Zealand)

30 August 2011
10:00

Fiji	9–0	Kiribati
Krishna 17' (pen.), 56', 86'; Suwamy 47'; Avinesh 52'; Dunadamu 63', 72'; Kamta 90+1' (o.g.); Manuca 90+2'

Stade Boewa, Boulari
Referee: Isidore Assiene-Ambassa (New Caledonia)
30 August 2011
15:00

Tahiti	7–0	Cook Islands
Neuffer 48'; Atani 59'; Funnell 69' (o.g.); Chong Hue 73', 90+1'; Poroiae 82' (pen.), 89'

Stade Boewa, Boulari
Referee: Gerald Oiaka (Solomon Islands)

1 September 2011
10:00

Cook Islands	3–0	Kiribati
Saghabi 27', 89'; Pareanga 90+2'

Stade Boewa, Boulari
Referee: Bertrand Billon (New Caledonia)
1 September 2011
15:00

Tahiti	1–1	Papua New Guinea
Atani 23'		C. Muta 15'

Stade Boewa, Boulari
Referee: Andrew Achari (Fiji)

3 September 2011
10:00

Kiribati	1–17	Papua New Guinea
Bakaane 71'		Kini 13', 79', 85'; N. Lepani 15', 16', 54', 68'; Foster 16'; Hans 21', 45+1' (pen.); Moka 24', 28', 41'; Yasasa 73', 74'; Bondaluke 76'; Wasi 90+2'

Stade Boewa, Boulari
Referee: Gerald Oiaka (Solomon Islands)
3 September 2011
15:00

Cook Islands	1–4	Fiji
Ngauora 41'		Krishna 24'; Kainihewe 35'; Dunadamu 57' (pen.); Suwamy 69'

Stade Boewa, Boulari
Referee: Isidore Assiene-Ambassa (New Caledonia)

5 September 2011
10:00

Kiribati	1–17	Tahiti
Bakineti 32'		Poroiae 16', 44' (pen.); Chong Hue 19', 28', 33', 46'; Arañeda 21'; Mataitai 53'; Ludivion 57'; T. Tehau 73', 79', 85', 88', 90', 90+1'; Faatiarau 83' (pen.); Atani 86'

Stade Boewa, Boulari
Referee: Gerald Oiaka (Solomon Islands)
5 September 2011
15:00

Papua New Guinea	0–2	Fiji
		Suwamy 37'; Kainihewe 45+1'

Stade Boewa, Boulari
Referee: Bertrand Billon (New Caledonia)

== Semi-finals ==
New Caledonia defeated Tahiti and the Solomon Islands defeated Fiji, both after extra time, to advance to the gold medal match.

7 September 2011
15:00

New Caledonia	3–1 (a.e.t.)	Tahiti
Gope-Fenepej 89', 108'; Hmaé 115'		Poroiae 52'

Stade Yoshida, Koné
Referee: Rakesh Varman (Fiji)

7 September 2011
15:00

Fiji	1–2 (a.e.t.)	Solomon Islands
Dunadamu 69'		Nawo 77'; Fa'arodo 93' (pen.)

Stade Hnassé, Lifou
Referee: Averii Jacques (Tahiti)

== Bronze medal match ==
Tahiti defeated Fiji to win the bronze medal.

9 September 2011
15:00

Tahiti	2–1	Fiji
Atani 5'; L. Tehau 65'		Avinesh 58'

Stade Boewa, Boulari
Referee: Bertrand Billon (New Caledonia)

== Gold medal match ==
New Caledonia defeated the Solomon Islands to win the gold medal.

9 September 2011
20:00

New Caledonia	2–0	Solomon Islands
Gope-Fenepej 9'; Bako 11'

Stade Numa Daly, Nouméa
Referee: Chris Kerr (New Zealand)

== Aftermath ==
The match between Tahiti and Kiribati on 5 September 2011 was the most recent to involve Kiribati.

=== 2012 Pacific Cup ===
In 2010 the Oceania Football Confederation (OFC) announced the creation of a new tournament, the Pacific Cup. Five teams would qualify from the 2011 Pacific Games for the first edition in February 2012 and the New Zealand Olympic team was also invited to participate.

The tournament had initially been planned as part of the qualification tournament for the 2012 OFC Nations Cup, and the OFC's qualification tournament for the 2014 FIFA World Cup. However, FIFA announced a revised format for both tournaments in June 2011, meaning that the Pacific Games were no longer part of qualification, and therefore were not FIFA authorised games.

== See also ==
- Women's Football at the 2011 Pacific Games
- Pacific Games
