= Stade Boewa =

Sports stadium in Boulari Bay, New Caledonia, primarily used for association football

Coordinates: 22.2274°S 166.5183°E

Stade Boewa is a sports stadium in Boulari Bay, New Caledonia that is primarily used for association football. The stadium is home to a number of local clubs and was also a venue used in the men's football tournament at the 2011 Pacific Games. As such, Stade Boewa was the venue of the 2011 Pacific Games' biggest victories, namely Papua New Guinea's 17-1 win over Kiribati on 3 September 2011 and Tahiti's 17-1 win over Kiribati on 5 September 2011.
