= Boulari Bay =

Bay in New Caledonia, France

Coordinates: 22°15′14″S 166°31′34″E

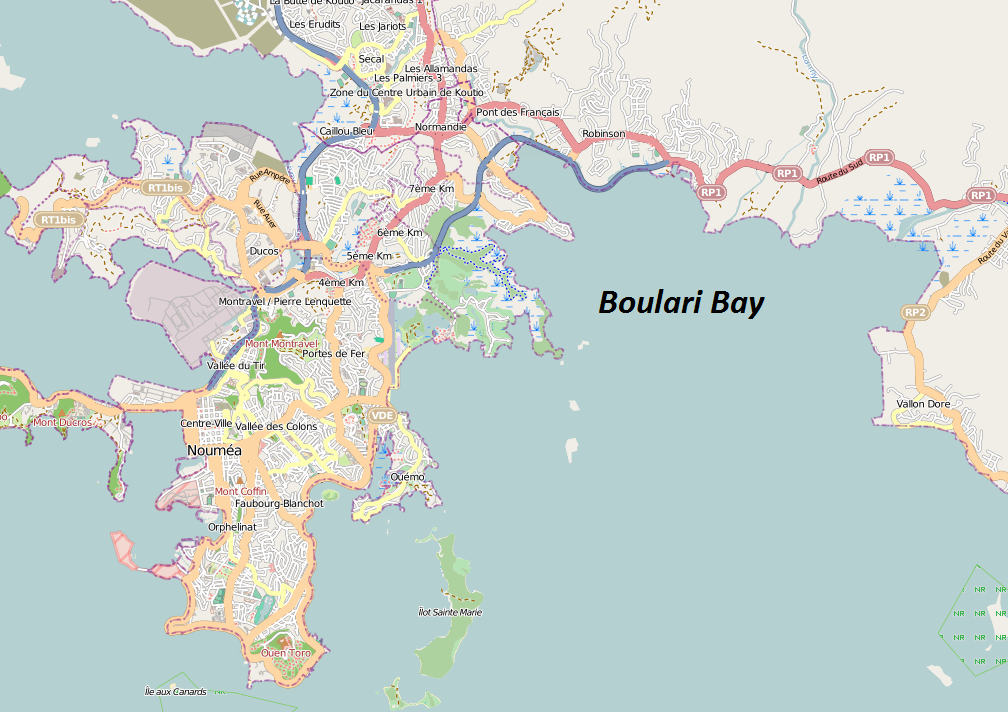

Boulari Bay or Baie de Boulari is a bay in southwestern New Caledonia. It forms the stretch of water to the east of Noumea.
