= New Caledonia national football team results (2000–present) =

The New Caledonia national football team represents New Caledonia in association football and is controlled by the Fédération Calédonienne de Football (FCF), the governing body of the sport in the territory. Before joining Fédération Internationale de Football Association (FIFA) and the Oceania Football Confederation (OFC), it played its first match in September 1951 – a 2–0 victory against New Zealand.

Since 2000, New Caledonia has played a total of 125 matches. The territory has recorded 60 wins, 18 draws and 47 defeats, scoring 316 goals and conceding 168.

In 2004, FCF joined both FIFA and the OFC and the national team began competing in the qualifying stages of the FIFA World Cup. During their first qualifying campaign for the 2006 FIFA World Cup in May 2004, New Caledonia recorded two 8–0 wins against Tonga and the Cook Islands but were eliminated after a 2–0 loss to the Solomon Islands. The team's best result in World Cup qualification came in 2026 when they reached the play-offs but lost 1–0 to Jamaica.

New Caledonia attained success at the Pacific Games. At the 2007 South Pacific Games in Apia, Samoa, New Caledonia won their first gold medal in the event for 20 years after defeating Fiji 1–0 in the gold medal match. They would go onto win further gold medals as hosts in 2011 and in 2023.

Bertrand Kaï became New Caledonia's top goalscorer after scoring a brace against American Samoa during the 2019 Pacific Games in July 2019. Kaï has scored a total of 23 goals in 43 caps between 2008 and 2022.

== Key ==
Key to matches

- Att. = Match attendance
- (H) = Home ground
- (A) = Away ground
- (N) = Neutral ground

Key to record by opponent

- Pld = Games played
- W = Games won
- D = Games drawn
- L = Games lost
- GF = Goals for
- GA = Goals against

== Results ==
New Caledonia's score is shown first in each case.

No.	Date	Venue	Opponents	Score	Competition	New Caledonia scorers	Att.	Ref.
158	8 April 2000	Suva (N)	Solomon Islands	4–2	2000 Melanesia Cup	W. Didler, M. Marius, L. Steve, J. Pibee	—	
159	10 April 2000	Suva (N)	Fiji	1–2	2000 Melanesia Cup	W. Didier	—	
160	11 April 2000	Suva (N)	Papua New Guinea	6–1	2000 Melanesia Cup	W. Didler, M. Patrice, M. Marius, F. Yues, P. Joris, E. Alexander	—	
161	13 April 2000	Suva (N)	Vanuatu	0–6	2000 Melanesia Cup		—	
162	12 June 2000	New Caledonia (H)	Vanuatu	3–1	Friendly	Unknown	—	
163	15 June 2000	New Caledonia (H)	Vanuatu	1–0	Friendly	Unknown	—	
164	9 March 2002	Toleofoa Joseph Blatter Soccer Complex, Apia (N)	American Samoa	10–0	2002 OFC Nations Cup qualification	Case, Pibke (5), Jose, Kauma, Wanakaija, Voudjo	—	
165	12 March 2002	Toleofoa Joseph Blatter Soccer Complex, Apia (N)	Papua New Guinea	1–4	2002 OFC Nations Cup qualification	Voudjo	—	
166	16 March 2002	Toleofoa Joseph Blatter Soccer Complex, Apia (N)	Tonga	9–0	2002 OFC Nations Cup qualification	Faye (2), Pibke (3), Voudjo, Kabeu, Kauma, Jose	—	
167	18 March 2002	Toleofoa Joseph Blatter Soccer Complex, Apia (N)	Samoa	5–0	2002 OFC Nations Cup qualification	Kauma, Hay (2), Pibke, Mapou	—	
168	6 July 2002	Mount Smart Stadium, Auckland (N)	Fiji	1–2	2002 OFC Nations Cup	Sinédo	1,000	
169	8 July 2002	Mount Smart Stadium, Auckland (N)	Australia	0–11	2002 OFC Nations Cup		200	
170	10 July 2002	Mount Smart Stadium, Auckland (N)	Vanuatu	0–1	2002 OFC Nations Cup		500	
171	30 June 2003	National Stadium, Suva (N)	Papua New Guinea	2–0	2003 South Pacific Games	Djamali, Hmae	—	
172	1 July 2003	National Stadium, Suva (N)	Federated States of Micronesia	18–0	2003 South Pacific Games	Hmaé (4), Poatinda (6), Wajoka (3), Elmour, Joseph, Jacques, Theodore, Jacky	3,000	
173	3 July 2003	National Stadium, Suva (N)	Tonga	4–0	2003 South Pacific Games	Djamali, Dokunengo, Cawa, Kabeu	700	
174	5 July 2003	Ratu Cakobau Park, Nausori (N)	Tahiti	4–0	2003 South Pacific Games	Lameu (2), Djamali, Poatinda	3,000	
175	9 July 2003	Churchill Park, Lautoka (N)	Vanuatu	1–1 (a.e.t.) (4–3p)	2003 South Pacific Games	Kabeu	7,000	
176	11 July 2003	National Stadium, Suva (N)	Fiji	0–2	2003 South Pacific Games		9,000	
177	12 May 2004	Lawson Tama Stadium, Honiara (N)	Tahiti	0–0	2006 FIFA World Cup qualification		14,000	
178	15 May 2004	Lawson Tama Stadium, Honiara (N)	Solomon Islands	0–2	2006 FIFA World Cup qualification		20,000	
179	17 May 2004	Lawson Tama Stadium, Honiara (N)	Cook Islands	8–0	2006 FIFA World Cup qualification	Wajoka, Hmaé (5), Djamali, Hmae	—	
180	19 May 2004	Lawson Tama Stadium, Honiara (N)	Tonga	8–0	2006 FIFA World Cup qualification	Hmaé, Poatinda (3), Hmae, Wajaha (2), Kaume	14,000	
181	17 July 2007	Stade Numa-Daly Magenta, Nouméa (H)	Vanuatu	5–3	Friendly	Unknown	—	
182	19 July 2007	Stade Numa-Daly Magenta, Nouméa (H)	Vanuatu	0–2	Friendly		—	
183	25 August 2007	Toleofoa Joseph Blatter Soccer Complex, Apia (N)	Tahiti	1–0	2007 South Pacific Games	Wajoka	400	
184	27 August 2007	Toleofoa Joseph Blatter Soccer Complex, Apia (N)	Tuvalu	1–0	2007 South Pacific Games	Kabeu	250	
185	29 August 2007	Toleofoa Joseph Blatter Soccer Complex, Apia (N)	Cook Islands	3–0	2007 South Pacific Games	Kabeu (3)	200	
186	3 September 2007	Toleofoa Joseph Blatter Soccer Complex, Apia (N)	Fiji	1–1	2007 South Pacific Games	Wajoka	1,000	
187	5 September 2007	Toleofoa Joseph Blatter Soccer Complex, Apia (N)	Solomon Islands	3–2	2007 South Pacific Games	Kabeu, Toto, Mercier	1,500	
188	7 September 2007	Toleofoa Joseph Blatter Soccer Complex, Apia (N)	Fiji	1–0	2007 South Pacific Games	Hmaé	400	
189	17 November 2007	Govind Park, Ba (A)	Fiji	3–3	2008 OFC Nations Cup	Djamali, Kaudre, Hmaé	1,500	
190	21 November 2007	Stade Numa-Daly Magenta, Nouméa (H)	Fiji	4–0	2008 OFC Nations Cup	Wajoka, Hmaé (2), Mapou	1,000	
191	14 June 2008	Korman Stadium, Port Vila (A)	Vanuatu	1–1	2008 OFC Nations Cup	Djamali	4,000	
192	21 June 2008	Stade Numa-Daly Magenta, Nouméa (H)	Vanuatu	3–0	2008 OFC Nations Cup	Wajoka, Hmaé, Diaiké	2,700	
193	6 September 2008	Stade Numa-Daly Magenta, Nouméa (H)	New Zealand	1–3	2008 OFC Nations Cup	Hmaé	2,589	
194	10 September 2008	North Harbour Stadium, Auckland (A)	New Zealand	0–3	2008 OFC Nations Cup		8,000	
195	24 September 2008	Stade de Marville, La Courneuve (N)	Tahiti	1–0	2008 Coupe de l'Outre-Mer	Hmaé	—	
196	27 September 2008	Stade Municipal, Melun (N)	Guadeloupe	0–4	2008 Coupe de l'Outre-Mer		—	
197	30 September 2008	Stade Léo Lagrange, Poissy (N)	Martinique	1–1 (3–4p)	2008 Coupe de l'Outre-Mer	Lolohea	—	
198	3 October 2008	Stade de Marville, La Courneuve (N)	Mayotte	3–2	2008 Coupe de l'Outre-Mer	Wajoka, Kaï	—	
199	22 September 2010	Parc des Sports des Maisons Rouges, Bry-sur-Marne (N)	Guadeloupe	1–1 (6–5p)	2010 Coupe de l'Outre-Mer	Hmaé	—	
200	25 September 2010	Stade Henri-Longuet, Viry-Châtillon (N)	Martinique	0–4	2010 Coupe de l'Outre-Mer		—	
201	29 September 2010	Stade Langrenay, Longjumeau (N)	Tahiti	1–1 (3–5p)	2010 Coupe de l'Outre-Mer	Watrone	—	
202	24 January 2011	Vanuatu (A)	Vanuatu	0–0	Friendly		—	
203	3 April 2011	Stade Pater Te Hono Nui, Pirae (A)	Tahiti	3–1	Friendly	Unknown	—	
204	6 April 2011	Stade de Paea, Paea (A)	Tahiti	0–1	Friendly		—	
205	4 May 2011	New Caledonia (H)	Réunion	2–4	Friendly	Unknown	—	
206	7 May 2011	New Caledonia (H)	Réunion	1–3	Friendly	Unknown	—	
207	27 August 2011	Stade Rivière Salée, Nouméa (N)	Vanuatu	5–0	2011 Pacific Games	Gope-Fenepej (3), Bako, Lolohea	—	
208	30 August 2011	Stade Rivière Salée, Nouméa (N)	Guam	9–0	2011 Pacific Games	Kaï (5), Boawé, Kabeu, J. Wakanumuné, Hmaé	—	
209	1 September 2011	Stade Rivière Salée, Nouméa (N)	Tuvalu	8–0	2011 Pacific Games	Gorendiawé, Kabeu (2), Gope-Fenepej, Haeko, Lolohea, Hmaé (2)	—	
210	3 September 2011	Stade Rivière Salée, Nouméa (N)	American Samoa	8–0	2011 Pacific Games	Kaï (4), Haeko, Qaézé, Vendegou, Hmaé	—	
211	5 September 2011	Stade Rivière Salée, Nouméa (N)	Solomon Islands	1–2	2011 Pacific Games	Kaï	—	
212	7 September 2011	Stade Yoshida, Koné (N)	Tahiti	3–1 (a.e.t.)	2011 Pacific Games	Gope-Fenepej (2), Hmaé	—	
213	9 September 2011	Stade Numa-Daly Magenta, Nouméa (N)	Solomon Islands	2–0	2011 Pacific Games	Gope-Fenepej, Bako	—	
214	1 June 2012	Lawson Tama Stadium, Honiara (N)	Vanuatu	5–2	2012 OFC Nations Cup	Kaï (3), Gope-Fenepej, Kayara	7,000	
215	3 June 2012	Lawson Tama Stadium, Honiara (N)	Tahiti	3–4	2012 OFC Nations Cup	Bako, Haeko, Kauma	3,500	
216	5 June 2012	Lawson Tama Stadium, Honiara (N)	Samoa	9–0	2012 OFC Nations Cup	Kayara, Haeko (5), Kabeu, Ixoée, Gnipate	1,000	
217	8 June 2012	Lawson Tama Stadium, Honiara (N)	New Zealand	2–0	2012 OFC Nations Cup	Kaï, Gope-Fenepej	10,000	
218	10 June 2012	Lawson Tama Stadium, Honiara (N)	Tahiti	0–1	2012 OFC Nations Cup		10,000	
219	7 September 2012	Stade Numa-Daly Magenta, Nouméa (H)	New Zealand	0–2	2014 FIFA World Cup qualification		6,000	
220	12 September 2012	Stade Pater Te Hono Nui, Pirae (A)	Tahiti	4–0	2014 FIFA World Cup qualification	Samin (o.g.), Kaï, Gope-Fenepej (2)	574	
221	22 September 2012	Stade Jean-Bouin, Issy-les-Moulineaux (N)	Martinique	0–2	2012 Coupe de l'Outre-Mer		700	
222	24 September 2012	Complexe Sportif Léo Lagrange, Corbeil-Essonnes (N)	Mayotte	0–2	2012 Coupe de l'Outre-Mer		150	
223	26 September 2012	Stade Jean Rolland, Franconville (N)	Tahiti	0–1	2012 Coupe de l'Outre-Mer		200	
224	28 September 2012	INF Clairefontaine, Clairefontaine-en-Yvelines (N)	Saint Pierre and Miquelon	16–1	2012 Coupe de l'Outre-Mer	R. Audouze (o.g.), Whanyamalla (2), Kayara (2), Haeko (3), Kabeu, Kaï (2), Kauma, Mercier, É. Béaruné, G. Béaruné, Moagou	50	
225	12 October 2012	Lawson Tama Stadium, Honiara (A)	Solomon Islands	6–2	2014 FIFA World Cup qualification	Kayara, Gope-Fenepej (3), Faisi (o.g.), Haeko	8,000	
226	16 October 2012	Stade Numa-Daly Magenta, Nouméa (H)	Solomon Islands	5–0	2014 FIFA World Cup qualification	Gope-Fenepej, Kayara, Kabeu, Lolohea (2)	4,000	
227	22 March 2013	Forsyth Barr Stadium, Dunedin (A)	New Zealand	1–2	2014 FIFA World Cup qualification	Lolohea	9,000	
228	26 March 2013	Stade Numa-Daly Magenta, Nouméa (H)	Tahiti	1–0	2014 FIFA World Cup qualification	Lolohea	1,000	
229	26 March 2016	Port Vila Municipal Stadium, Port Vila (A)	Vanuatu	1–2	Friendly	Unknown	—	
230	29 May 2016	Sir John Guise Stadium, Port Moresby (N)	Papua New Guinea	1–1	2016 OFC Nations Cup	Saïko	4,231	
231	1 June 2016	Sir John Guise Stadium, Port Moresby (N)	Samoa	7–0	2016 OFC Nations Cup	Kayara (2), Nemia, Zeoula, Wadriako, Cexome, Dahité	2,015	
232	5 June 2016	Sir John Guise Stadium, Port Moresby (N)	Tahiti	1–1	2016 OFC Nations Cup	Kaï	3,158	
233	8 June 2016	Sir John Guise Stadium, Port Moresby (N)	New Zealand	0–1	2016 OFC Nations Cup		1,379	
234	22 June 2016	Stade Numa-Daly Magenta, Nouméa (H)	Malaysia	1–2	Friendly	Saïko	—	
235	5 October 2016	Lawson Tama Stadium, Honiara (A)	Solomon Islands	3–0	Friendly	Unknown	—	
236	8 October 2016	Lawson Tama Stadium, Honiara (A)	Solomon Islands	1–0	Friendly	Unknown	—	
237	12 November 2016	North Harbour Stadium, Auckland (A)	New Zealand	0–2	2018 FIFA World Cup qualification		8,131	
238	15 November 2016	Stade Yoshida, Koné (H)	New Zealand	0–0	2018 FIFA World Cup qualification		2,000	
239	7 June 2017	Churchill Park, Lautoka (A)	Fiji	2–2	2018 FIFA World Cup qualification	Wamowe (2)	1,500	
240	11 June 2017	Stade Numa-Daly Magenta, Nouméa (H)	Fiji	2–1	2018 FIFA World Cup qualification	Ounei, Sele	1,050	
241	26 November 2017	Stade Numa-Daly Magenta, Nouméa (H)	Estonia	1–1	Friendly	Ounei	—	
242	2 December 2017	Port Vila Municipal Stadium, Port Vila (N)	Vanuatu	1–2	2017 Pacific Mini Games	Wélépane	3,000	
243	5 December 2017	Korman Stadium, Port Vila (N)	Tuvalu	1–2	2017 Pacific Mini Games	Wélépane	3,000	
244	9 December 2017	Port Vila Municipal Stadium, Port Vila (N)	Tonga	4–2	2017 Pacific Mini Games	Gope-Iwate (2), Luépak, Waitreu	2,000	
245	12 December 2017	Korman Stadium, Port Vila (N)	Solomon Islands	0–1	2017 Pacific Mini Games		2,500	
246	15 December 2017	Port Vila Municipal Stadium, Port Vila (N)	Fiji	1–4	2017 Pacific Mini Games	Wélépane	1,500	
247	21 March 2018	Stade Pater Te Hono Nui, Pirae (A)	Tahiti	0–0	Friendly		2,000	
248	23 March 2018	Stade Pater Te Hono Nui, Pirae (A)	Tahiti	3–4	Friendly	Houala, Sele, Outiou	—	
249	14 November 2018	Korman Stadium, Port Vila (A)	Vanuatu	1–0	Friendly	Roïné	—	
250	17 November 2018	Korman Stadium, Port Vila (A)	Vanuatu	2–2	Friendly	Unknown	—	
251	18 March 2019	National Stadium, Suva (A)	Fiji	0–3	Friendly		600	
252	21 March 2019	Churchill Park, Lautoka (N)	Mauritius	1–3	Friendly	Kayara	—	
253	8 July 2019	National Soccer Stadium, Apia (N)	American Samoa	5–0	2019 Pacific Games	Hmaen, Kaï (2), Saïko (2)	100	
254	10 July 2019	National Soccer Stadium, Apia (N)	Solomon Islands	2–0	2019 Pacific Games	Saïko (2)	1,000	
255	12 July 2019	National Soccer Stadium, Apia (N)	Fiji	1–0	2019 Pacific Games	Saïko	800	
256	15 July 2019	National Soccer Stadium, Apia (N)	Tahiti	3–0	2019 Pacific Games	Hmaen, Wajoka, Zeoula	1,000	
257	18 July 2019	National Soccer Stadium, Apia (N)	Tuvalu	11–0	2019 Pacific Games	Saïko (4), Decoire (3), Nokisi (o.g.), Hmaen (2), Tein-Padom	100	
258	18 March 2022	Qatar SC Stadium, Doha (N)	Fiji	1–2	2022 FIFA World Cup qualification	Wetria	—	
259	21 March 2022	Qatar SC Stadium, Doha (N)	Papua New Guinea	0–1	2022 FIFA World Cup qualification		—	
260	24 March 2022	Qatar SC Stadium, Doha (N)	New Zealand	1–7	2022 FIFA World Cup qualification	Saïko	—	
261	17 September 2022	Korman Stadium, Port Vila (N)	Fiji	0–1	2022 MSG Prime Minister's Cup		—	
262	21 September 2022	Korman Stadium, Port Vila (N)	Solomon Islands	0–1	2022 MSG Prime Minister's Cup		—	
263	20 March 2023	Stade Pater Te Hono Nui, Pirae (A)	Tahiti	2–0	Friendly	Xowi, Rokuad	—	
264	23 March 2023	Stade Pater Te Hono Nui, Pirae (A)	Tahiti	1–2	Friendly	Xowi	—	
265	8 October 2023	Stade Numa-Daly Magenta, Nouméa (N)	Vanuatu	4–0	2023 MSG Prime Minister's Cup	Bako, Read, Waia, Wawia	—	
266	11 October 2023	Stade Yoshida, Koné (N)	Papua New Guinea	3–1	2023 MSG Prime Minister's Cup	Neoere, Wélépane, Xowi	—	
267	14 October 2023	Stade Numa-Daly Magenta, Nouméa (N)	Solomon Islands	0–1	2023 MSG Prime Minister's Cup		—	
268	18 November 2023	SIFF Academy Field, Honiara (N)	Tonga	7–0	2023 Pacific Games	Waya (3), Vakié, Zeoula, Wélépane, Katrawa	—	
269	24 November 2023	SIFF Academy Field, Honiara (N)	Cook Islands	8–0	2023 Pacific Games	Zeoula (2), Xowi, Waya (3), Katrawa (2)	—	
270	28 November 2023	Lawson Tama Stadium, Honiara (N)	Vanuatu	1–0	2023 Pacific Games	Xowi	—	
271	2 December 2023	Lawson Tama Stadium, Honiara (N)	Solomon Islands	2–2 (7–6p)	2023 Pacific Games	Waya, Wélépane	—	
272	10 October 2024	National Stadium, Suva (N)	Papua New Guinea	3–1	2026 FIFA World Cup qualification	Athale, Gope-Fenepej, Haewegene	1,000	
273	14 November 2024	PNG Football Stadium, Port Moresby (N)	Solomon Islands	3–2	2026 FIFA World Cup qualification	Athale (2), Waia	1,000	
274	17 November 2024	PNG Football Stadium, Port Moresby (N)	Fiji	1–1	2026 FIFA World Cup qualification	Katrawa	877	
275	21 March 2025	Wellington Regional Stadium, Wellington (N)	Tahiti	3–0	2026 FIFA World Cup qualification	Gope-Fenepej (2), Waya	1,948	
276	24 March 2025	Eden Park, Auckland (N)	New Zealand	0–3	2026 FIFA World Cup qualification		25,132	
277	8 October 2025	Europa Point Stadium, Gibraltar (A)	Gibraltar	2–0	Friendly	Katrawa, Haewegene	—	
278	26 March 2026	Estadio Akron, Zapopan (N)	Jamaica	0–1	2026 FIFA World Cup play-off		40,983	
279	21 September 2026	National Stadium, Suva (N)	Solomon Islands	0–2	2026 MSG Prime Minister's Cup		—	
280	24 September 2026	National Stadium, Suva (N)	Papua New Guinea	2–1	2026 MSG Prime Minister's Cup	Dahite, Read	—	
281	27 September 2026	National Stadium, Suva (N)	Vanuatu	1–4	2026 MSG Prime Minister's Cup	Decoire	—	
282	30 September 2026	National Stadium, Suva (N)	Fiji	1–2	2026 MSG Prime Minister's Cup	Read	—	

Notes

1. A: The 2000 Melanesia Cup doubled as qualifiers for the 2000 OFC Nations Cup.
2. B: The first round of Oceanian qualifiers for the 2006 FIFA World Cup doubled as qualifiers for the 2004 OFC Nations Cup.
3. C: The men's football tournament at the 2007 South Pacific Games doubled as qualifiers for the 2008 OFC Nations Cup and the first round of qualifiers for the 2010 FIFA World Cup.
4. D: The 2008 OFC Nations Cup doubled as the second round of qualifiers for the 2010 FIFA World Cup.
5. E: The 2012 OFC Nations Cup doubled as the second round of qualifiers for the 2014 FIFA World Cup.
6. F: The 2016 OFC Nations Cup doubled as the second round of qualifiers for the 2018 FIFA World Cup.

== Record by opponent ==
Team	Pld	W	D	L	GF	GA	GD	WPCT
American Samoa	3	3	0	0	23	0	+23	100.00
Australia	1	0	0	1	0	11	−11	0.00
Cook Islands	3	3	0	0	19	0	+19	100.00
Estonia	1	0	1	0	1	1	0	0.00
Fiji	16	4	4	8	20	26	−6	25.00
Gibraltar	1	1	0	0	2	0	+2	100.00
Guadeloupe	2	0	1	1	1	5	−4	0.00
Guam	1	1	0	0	9	0	+9	100.00
Jamaica	1	0	0	1	0	1	−1	0.00
Malaysia	1	0	0	1	1	2	−1	0.00
Martinique	3	0	1	2	1	7	−6	0.00
Mauritius	1	0	0	1	1	3	−2	0.00
Mayotte	2	1	0	1	3	4	−1	50.00
Federated States of Micronesia	1	1	0	0	18	0	+18	100.00
New Zealand	10	1	1	8	5	23	−18	10.00
Papua New Guinea	8	5	1	2	18	10	+8	62.50
Réunion	2	0	0	2	3	7	−4	0.00
Saint Pierre and Miquelon	1	1	0	0	16	1	+15	100.00
Samoa	3	3	0	0	21	0	+21	100.00
Solomon Islands	16	9	1	6	32	19	+13	56.25
Tahiti	20	10	4	6	34	17	+17	50.00
Tonga	5	5	0	0	32	2	+30	100.00
Tuvalu	4	3	0	1	21	2	+19	75.00
Vanuatu	19	9	4	6	35	27	+8	47.37
Total	125	60	18	47	316	168	+148	48.00

Source: Results
