= 2012 OFC Nations Cup final =

- Event: 2012 OFC Nations Cup
Tahiti	New Caledonia
(French Polynesia)	(New Caledonia)
1	0
- Date: 10 June 2012
- Venue: Lawson Tama Stadium, Honiara
- Referee: Peter O'Leary (New Zealand)
- Attendance: 10,000

The 2012 OFC Nations Cup final was the final match of the 2012 OFC Nations Cup. It was held on 10 June in Honiara between Tahiti and New Caledonia. Tahiti won the match 1–0.

== Road to the final ==
Tahiti
Round
New Caledonia
Opponent
Result
Group stage
Opponent
Result
Samoa
10–1
Match 1
Vanuatu
5–2
New Caledonia
4–3
Match 2
Tahiti
3–4
Vanuatu
4–1
Match 3
Samoa
9–0
Group A winner

Team	Pld	W	D	L	GF	GA	GD	Pts
Tahiti	3	3	0	0	18	5	+13	9
New Caledonia	3	2	0	1	17	6	+11	6
Vanuatu	3	1	0	2	8	9	-1	3
Samoa	3	0	0	3	1	24	−23	0

Final standings
Group A runners-up

Team	Pld	W	D	L	GF	GA	GD	Pts
Tahiti	3	3	0	0	18	5	+13	9
New Caledonia	3	2	0	1	17	6	+11	6
Vanuatu	3	1	0	2	8	9	-1	3
Samoa	3	0	0	3	1	24	−23	0

Opponent
Result
Knockout stage
Opponent
Result
Solomon Islands
1–0
Semi-finals
New Zealand
2–0

== Match ==
=== Details ===
10 June 2012
15:00 UTC+11

Tahiti	1–0	New Caledonia
Chong Hue 10'	Report

Lawson Tama Stadium, Honiara
Attendance: 10,000
Referee: Peter O'Leary (New Zealand)

Tahiti	New Caledonia

GK	21	Xavier Samin
RB	19	Vincent Simon
CB	10	Nicolas Vallar (c)
CB	4	Teheivarii Ludivion
LB	8	Angelo Tchen	(yellow card) 62'
RM	6	Lorenzo Tehau	(yellow card) 56'	(substituted off) 89'
CM	15	Heimano Bourebare		(substituted off) 90+2'
CM	7	Henri Caroine
LM	17	Jonathan Tehau
ST	13	Steevy Chong Hue
ST	2	Alvin Tehau
Substitutions:
FW	11	Manaraii Porlier		(substituted in) 89'
FW	15	Roihau Degage		(substituted in) 90+2'
Manager:
(French Polynesia) Eddy Etaeta

GK	1	Rocky Nyikeine
RB	2	Judikael Ixoée	(yellow card) 30'
CB	3	Emile Béaruné	(yellow card) 69'
CB	17	Joël Wakanumuné
LB	10	Marius Bako	(yellow card) 39'
DM	6	Olivier Dokunengo (c)	(yellow card) 50'	(substituted off) 67'
RM	16	Iamel Kabeu
LM	7	Dominique Wacalie
AM	8	Bertrand Kaï
ST	19	Georges Gope-Fenepej
ST	9	Jacques Haeko
Substitutions:
MF	12	Roy Kayara		(substituted in) 67'
Manager:
(France) Alain Moizan
