= 2011–12 in Vanuatuan football =

Football in Vanuatu
- Season: 2011–12

The 2011–2012 season is the 60th season of competitive football in Vanuatu.

== National teams ==
The home team or the team that is designated as the home team is listed in the left column; the away team is

in the right column.

Win Draw Loss

=== Senior ===
==== 2011 Pacific Games ====
27 August 2011 Group A	New Caledonia	5 – 0	Vanuatu	Nouméa, New Caledonia
15:00 UTC+11	Gope-Fenepej 5', 31', 63'; Bako 43'; Lolohea 51'	(Report)		Stadium: Stade Rivière Salée; Referee: Andrew Achari (Fiji)

30 August 2011 Group A	Vanuatu	5 – 1	Tuvalu	Nouméa, New Caledonia
09:00 UTC+11	J. Kaltak 8', 38', 45+1', 80'; Yelou 49' (pen.)	(Report)	Ale 90+1'	Stadium: Stade Rivière Salée; Referee: Rakesh Varman (Fiji)

1 September 2011 Group A	Vanuatu	1 – 0	Solomon Islands	Nouméa, New Caledonia
15:00 UTC+11	J. Kaltak 90+2'	(Report)		Stadium: Stade Rivière Salée; Referee: Kader Zitouni (Tahiti)

3 September 2011 Group A	Guam	1 – 4	Vanuatu	Nouméa, New Caledonia
09:00 UTC+11	Cunliffe 14'	(Report)	Tangis 50'; Tasso 53'; J. Kaltak 75'; Tari 82'	Stadium: Stade Rivière Salée; Referee: Kader Zitouni (Tahiti)

5 September 2011 Group A	American Samoa	0 – 8	Vanuatu	Nouméa, New Caledonia
12:00 UTC+11		(Report)	Michel 8', 22'; Garae 43'; J. Kaltak 62', 70', 78'; Kaltak 64'; Aala 73'	Stadium: Stade Rivière Salée; Referee: Andrew Achari (Fiji)

==== 2012 OFC Nations Cup ====
1 June Group A	Vanuatu	2 – 5	New Caledonia	Honiara, Solomon Islands
15:00 UTC+11	Tasso 52'; Naprapol 61'	(Report)	Kaï 32', 58', 76'; Gope-Fenepej 66'; R. Kayara 87'	Stadium: Lawson Tama Stadium; Attendance: 5,000; Referee: Peter O'Leary (New Zealand)

3 June Group A	Vanuatu	5 – 0	Samoa	Honiara, Solomon Islands
12:00 UTC+11	Naprapol 29'; B. Kaltack 45+1'; Malas 47'; Tasso 74'; Vava 90+3'	(Report)		Stadium: Lawson Tama Stadium; Attendance: 2,200; Referee: John Saohu (Solomon Islands)

5 June 2012 Group A	Tahiti	4 – 1	Vanuatu	Honiara, Solomon Islands
15:00 UTC+11	Vallar 14' (pen.); J. Tehau 37'; A. Tehau 57'; T. Tehau 86'	(Report)	Tasso 90+5'	Stadium: Lawson Tama Stadium; Attendance: 1,000; Referee: Peter O'Leary (New Zealand)

== Vanuatu Premia Divisen ==
Pos	Team	Pld	W	D	L	GF	GA	GD	Pts	Qualification or relegation
1	Amicale FC (C)	14	12	1	1	50	4	+46	37	Advance to the 2012 VFF National Super League
2	Tafea FC (Q)	14	11	0	3	35	8	+27	33	Advance to the 2012 VFF National Super League
3	Shepherds United (Q)	14	7	2	5	25	24	+1	23	Advance to the 2012 VFF National Super League
4	Tupuji Imere (Q)	14	5	3	6	14	27	−13	18	Advance to the 2012 VFF National Super League
5	Seveners United (Q)	14	4	4	6	15	24	−9	16	Advance to the 2012 VFF National Super League
6	Spirit 08	14	4	3	7	18	20	−2	15	
7	Ifira Black Bird	14	3	1	10	13	40	−27	10	
8	Teouma Academy	14	2	2	10	13	36	−23	8	Relegated to the 2012–13 TVL First Division

Updated to match(es) played on 14 October 2015. Source:
Rules for classification: 1) points; 2) goal difference; 3) number of goals scored.
(C) Champions; (Q) Qualified for the phase indicated

== Vanuatuan clubs in international competitions ==
Club	Competition	Final round
Amicale	2011–12 OFC Champions League	Group Stage

=== Amicale F.C. ===
29 October 2011 Group B	Amicale (Vanuatu)	1 – 1	(Papua New Guinea) Hekari United	Port Vila, Vanuatu
15:00 UTC+11	Masauvakalo 45'	(Report)	Jack 90+4'	Stadium: Port Vila Municipal Stadium; Attendance: 6,500; Referee: Peter O'Leary (New Zealand)

19 November 2011 Group B	Amicale (Vanuatu)	2 – 0	(Solomon Islands) Koloale	Port Vila, Vanuatu
15:00 UTC+11	Waroi 3', 50'	(Report)		Stadium: PVL Stadium; Attendance: 6,000; Referee: Nick Waldron (New Zealand)

18 January 2012 Group B	Auckland City (New Zealand)	3 – 2	(Vanuatu) Amicale	Auckland, New Zealand
17:45 UTC+13	Expósito 40', 45' (pen.); Dickinson 87'		Pritchett 23' (o.g.); Maemae 76'	Stadium: Kiwitea Street; Attendance: 800; Referee: Kader Zitouni (Tahiti)

18 February 2012 Group B	Hekari United (Papua New Guinea)	2 – 0	(Vanuatu) Amicale	Port Moresby, Papua New Guinea
15:00 UTC+10	Jack 11', 79'	(Report)		Stadium: PMRL Stadium; Attendance: 5,000; Referee: Chris Kerr (New Zealand)

3 March 2012 Group B	Koloale (Solomon Islands)	1 – 0	(Vanuatu) Amicale	Honiara, Solomon Islands
15:00 UTC+11	Sale 87'	(Report)		Stadium: Lawson Tama Stadium; Referee: Nick Waldron (New Zealand)

31 March 2012 Group B	Amicale (Vanuatu)	1 – 0	(New Zealand) Auckland City	Port Vila, Vanuatu
15:00 UTC+11	Tangis 60'	(Report)		Stadium: PVL Stadium; Attendance: 5,000; Referee: Bruce George (Vanuatu)
