= OFC Men's Nations Cup awards =

At the end of each OFC Men's Nations Cup final tournament, several awards are presented to the players and teams which have distinguished themselves in various aspects of the match.

== Awards ==
There are currently four post-tournament awards

- the Golden Ball for most valuable player;
- the Golden Boot for most prolific goal scorer;
- the Golden Glove for most outstanding goalkeeper;
- the Fair Play Award for the team with the best record of fair play.

== Best Player ==
Year	Hosts	Best Player	Ref.
2012	Solomon Islands	(French Polynesia) Nicolas Vallar	
2016	Papua New Guinea	(Papua New Guinea) David Muta	
2024	Fiji; Vanuatu	(New Zealand) Liberato Cacace	

== Top Goalscorer ==
Year	Hosts	Top scorer(s)	Goals	Ref.
1973	New Zealand	(New Caledonia) Segin Wayewol (New Zealand) Alan Marley	3	
1980	New Caledonia	(Australia) Ian Hunter (Australia) Eddie Krncevic	5	
1996	No fixed host	(Australia) Kris Trajanovski	7	
1998	Australia	(Australia) Damian Mori	10	
2000	Tahiti	(Australia) Craig Foster (Australia) Clayton Zane	5	
2002	New Zealand	(Australia) Joel Porter	6	
2004	Australia	(Australia) Tim Cahill (New Zealand) Vaughan Coveny	6	
2008	No fixed host	(New Zealand) Shane Smeltz	8	
2012	Solomon Islands	(New Caledonia) Jacques Haeko	6	
2016	Papua New Guinea	(Papua New Guinea) Raymond Gunemba	5	
2024	Fiji; Vanuatu	(Fiji) Roy Krishna	5	

== Best Goalkeeper ==
Year	Hosts	Best Goalkeeper	Ref.
2012	Solomon Islands	(New Caledonia) Rocky Nyikeine	
2016	Papua New Guinea	(New Zealand) Stefan Marinovic	
2024	Fiji; Vanuatu	(New Zealand) Max Crocombe	

== Fair Play Award ==
Year	Hosts	Winner	Ref.
2012	Solomon Islands	Solomon Islands	
2016	Papua New Guinea	New Caledonia	
2024	Fiji; Vanuatu	New Zealand	

== See also ==
- FIFA World Cup awards
- UEFA European Championship awards
- Copa América awards
- Africa Cup of Nations awards
- AFC Asian Cup awards
- CONCACAF Gold Cup awards
