= 2014 FIFA World Cup qualification – OFC third round =

Football tournament qualification stage

This page provides the summaries of the OFC third round matches for 2014 FIFA World Cup qualification.

== Format ==
The third round saw the two group winners and two group runners-up from the 2012 OFC Nations Cup compete in a single group of four teams.

The matches were played in a double round-robin between 7 September 2012 and 26 March 2013, with the top team advancing to the play-off against the fourth-placed team from the CONCACAF fourth round.

== Qualified teams ==
Group A	Group B
Tahiti; New Caledonia	New Zealand; Solomon Islands

== Matches ==
Pos	Team	Pld	W	D	L	GF	GA	GD	Pts	Qualification	New Zealand men's national football team	New Caledonia national football team	Tahiti national football team	Solomon Islands national football team
1	New Zealand	6	6	0	0	17	2	+15	18	Advanced to the CONCACAF v OFC play-off	—	2–1	3–0	6–1
2	New Caledonia	6	4	0	2	17	6	+11	12		0–2	—	1–0	5–0
3	Tahiti	6	1	0	5	2	12	−10	3		0–2	0–4	—	2–0
4	Solomon Islands	6	1	0	5	5	21	−16	3		0–2	2–6	2–0	—

The draw for the fixtures was conducted at OFC Headquarters in Auckland, New Zealand, on 26 June 2012.

7 September 2012
15:00 UTC+11

Solomon Islands	2–0	Tahiti
Fa'arodo 17'; Teleda 60'	Report

Lawson Tama Stadium, Honiara
Attendance: 22,000
Referee: Jamie Cross (New Zealand)
7 September 2012
18:00 UTC+11

New Caledonia	0–2	New Zealand
	Report	Smeltz 11'; Wood 39'

Stade Numa-Daly Magenta, Nouméa
Attendance: 6,000
Referee: Norbert Hauata (Tahiti)

11 September 2012
19:35 UTC+12

New Zealand	6–1	Solomon Islands
Smeltz 12'; Barbarouses 25'; Killen 53'; Lochhead 69'; Wood 80'; Rojas 83'	Report	Fa'arodo 51'

North Harbour Stadium, Auckland
Attendance: 7,931
Referee: Bertrand Billon (New Caledonia)
11 September 2012
20:00 UTC−10

Tahiti	0–4	New Caledonia
	Report	Samin 59' (o.g.); Kaï 60'; Gope-Fenepej 63', 90'

Stade Pater Te Hono Nui, Pirae
Attendance: 574
Referee: Andrew Achari (Fiji)

12 October 2012
15:00 UTC+11

Solomon Islands	2–6	New Caledonia
Tanito 33'; Nawo 59'	Report	R. Kayara 8'; Gope-Fenepej 45', 81', 90+1'; Faisi 77' (o.g.); Haeko 89'

Lawson Tama Stadium, Honiara
Attendance: 8,000
Referee: Peter O'Leary (New Zealand)
12 October 2012
20:00 UTC−10

Tahiti	0–2	New Zealand
	Report	Smeltz 24'; Sigmund 82'

Stade Pater Te Hono Nui, Pirae
Attendance: 600
Referee: Bruce George (Vanuatu)

16 October 2012
19:40 UTC+13

New Zealand	3–0	Tahiti
McGlinchey 2', 90+3'; Killen 89'	Report

AMI Stadium, Christchurch
Attendance: 10,751
Referee: Gerald Oiaka (Solomon Islands)
16 October 2012
19:30 UTC+11

New Caledonia	5–0	Solomon Islands
Gope-Fenepej 4'; R. Kayara 8'; Kabeu 30'; Lolohea 42', 87'	Report

Stade Numa-Daly Magenta, Nouméa
Attendance: 4,000
Referee: Kader Zitouni (Tahiti)

22 March 2013
19:45 UTC+13

New Zealand	2–1	New Caledonia
Killen 10'; Smith 90+3'	Report	Lolohea 56'

Forsyth Barr Stadium, Dunedin
Attendance: 9,000
Referee: Strebre Delovski (Australia)
22 March 2013
20:00 UTC−10

Tahiti	2–0	Solomon Islands
Bourebare 25'; Hyanine 78'	Report

Stade Pater Te Hono Nui, Pirae
Attendance: 550
Referee: Andrew Achari (Fiji)

26 March 2013
15:00 UTC+11

Solomon Islands	0–2	New Zealand
	Report	Payne 3', 88'

Lawson Tama Stadium, Honiara
Attendance: 5,600
Referee: Averii Jacques (Tahiti)
26 March 2013
18:00 UTC+11

New Caledonia	1–0	Tahiti
Lolohea 86'	Report

Stade Numa-Daly Magenta, Nouméa
Attendance: 1,000
Referee: Rakesh Varman (Fiji)

== Goalscorers ==
There were 41 goals scored in 12 matches, for an average of 3.42 goals per match.

6 goals

- (New Caledonia) Georges Gope-Fenepej

4 goals

- (New Caledonia) César Lolohea

3 goals

- (New Zealand) Chris Killen
- (New Zealand) Shane Smeltz

2 goals

- (New Caledonia) Roy Kayara
- (New Zealand) Michael McGlinchey
- (New Zealand) Tim Payne
- (New Zealand) Chris Wood
- (Solomon Islands) Henry Fa'arodo

1 goal

- (New Caledonia) Jacques Haeko
- (New Caledonia) Iamel Kabeu
- (New Caledonia) Bertrand Kaï
- (New Zealand) Kosta Barbarouses
- (New Zealand) Tony Lochhead
- (New Zealand) Marco Rojas
- (New Zealand) Ben Sigmund
- (New Zealand) Tommy Smith
- (Solomon Islands) Joses Nawo
- (Solomon Islands) Tutizama Tanito
- (Solomon Islands) Himson Teleda
- (French Polynesia) Heimano Bourebare
- (French Polynesia) Samuel Hyanine

1 own goal

- (Solomon Islands) Tome Faisi (against New Caledonia)
- (French Polynesia) Xavier Samin (against New Caledonia)
