= 2014 FIFA World Cup qualification (OFC) =

Tournament details
- Dates: 22 November 2011 - 20 November 2013
- Teams: 11 (from 1 confederation)

Tournament statistics
- Matches played: 34
- Goals scored: 121 (3.56 per match)
- Attendance: 211,336 (6,216 per match)
- Top scorer(s): (New Caledonia) Georges Gope-Fenepej (8 Goals)

The OFC qualification for the 2014 FIFA World Cup saw teams of the Oceania Football Confederation competing for a place in the finals held in Brazil.

== Format ==
The initial format was scheduled to begin in August 2011 at the 2011 Pacific Games in Noumea, New Caledonia, where the men's football tournament was to double as the first stage of the OFC World Cup qualifying competition.

However, in June 2011 the format was amended, and the Pacific Games were no longer part of the qualification process. The new structure saw the four lowest ranked entrants play a single round-robin tournament from 22 to 26 November 2011 in Samoa. The top team in this tournament then joined the other seven teams in the 2012 OFC Nations Cup, with the four semi-finalists from that tournament advancing to the third round. This stage was originally scheduled to be held in Fiji in June 2012, but on 14 March 2012 the hosting rights were stripped from Fiji as a result of an ongoing legal dispute involving OFC general secretary Tai Nicholas and Fijian authorities. The loss of the finals was confirmed by the Fiji Football Association on 16 March.

The third round consisted of a double round-robin held on a home-and-away basis, scheduled to take place between 7 September 2012 and 26 March 2013. The third round winners competed in the intercontinental play-offs with CONCACAF's fourth-placed team, which was chosen through a random draw, rather than being decided by FIFA beforehand as in previous tournaments (e.g., 2010 against a team from AFC, 2006 against a team from CONMEBOL).

An early proposal to allow the qualifying winner to the final group stage of AFC qualification was submitted by New Zealand Football to FIFA. This proposal, supported by OFC, would have replaced the intercontinental play-off that had been used in recent qualification tournaments, but was not adopted.

== Entrants ==
The July 2011 FIFA Ranking is shown in brackets.

Bye to second round (Ranked 1st to 6th + PNG)	Competing in first round (Ranked 7th to 10th)
1. New Zealand (94); 2. Fiji (156); 3. New Caledonia (164); 4. Vanuatu (169); 5. Solomon Islands (181); 6. Tahiti (182); 11. Papua New Guinea (unranked)	7. Samoa (189); 8. Tonga (192); 9. Cook Islands (195); 10. American Samoa (203)

== First round ==
Based on FIFA ranks and other sporting considerations, the first round featured American Samoa, Cook Islands, Samoa and Tonga and were played as a single round-robin tournament in Samoa from 22 to 26 November 2011. The winner of the group advanced to the second round.

Pos	Team	Pld	W	D	L	GF	GA	GD	Pts	Qualification	Samoa national football team	Tonga national football team	American Samoa national football team	Cook Islands national football team
1	Samoa	3	2	1	0	5	3	+2	7	Qualified for the 2012 OFC Nations Cup	—	1–1	1–0	—
2	Tonga	3	1	1	1	4	4	0	4		—	—	—	2–1
3	American Samoa	3	1	1	1	3	3	0	4		—	2–1	—	1–1
4	Cook Islands	3	0	1	2	4	6	−2	1		2–3	—	—	—

The matches involving American Samoa are featured in the 2014 documentary Next Goal Wins and the 2023 dramatized film of the same name.

== Second round ==
The winner of the first round joined the remaining seven OFC teams in the 2012 OFC Nations Cup. The four semi-finalists (the top two teams from each group in the group stage) advanced to the third round. The groups were drawn at the World Cup Preliminary Draw at the Marina da Glória in Rio de Janeiro, Brazil on 30 July 2011.

The tournament was held in the Solomon Islands from 1 to 10 June 2012. Fiji had been the proposed host, but had their hosting rights revoked on 14 March 2012.

=== Seeding ===
The teams were seeded into two pots of 4 based on the July 2011 FIFA World Rankings, with the first round winner automatically seeded eighth. Each group consisted of two teams from each pot.

Pot 1	Pot 2
New Zealand; Fiji; New Caledonia; Vanuatu	Solomon Islands; Tahiti; Papua New Guinea; Samoa^{†}

^{†} First round winner whose identity was not known at the time of the draw.

=== Group stage ===
==== Group A ====
Pos	Team	Pld	W	D	L	GF	GA	GD	Pts	Qualification	Tahiti national football team	New Caledonia national football team	Vanuatu national football team	Samoa national football team
1	Tahiti	3	3	0	0	18	5	+13	9	Semi-finals and World Cup qualifying third round	—	—	4–1	—
2	New Caledonia	3	2	0	1	17	6	+11	6	Semi-finals and World Cup qualifying third round	3–4	—	5–2	9–0
3	Vanuatu	3	1	0	2	8	9	−1	3		—	—	—	—
4	Samoa	3	0	0	3	1	24	−23	0		1–10	—	0–5	—

==== Group B ====
Pos	Team	Pld	W	D	L	GF	GA	GD	Pts	Qualification	New Zealand men's national football team	Solomon Islands national football team	Fiji national football team	Papua New Guinea national soccer team
1	New Zealand	3	2	1	0	4	2	+2	7	Semi-finals and World Cup qualifying third round	—	1–1	—	2–1
2	Solomon Islands	3	1	2	0	2	1	+1	5	Semi-finals and World Cup qualifying third round	—	—	—	—
3	Fiji	3	0	2	1	1	2	−1	2		0–1	0–0	—	1–1
4	Papua New Guinea	3	0	1	2	2	4	−2	1		—	0–1	—	—

=== Knockout stage ===
The four semi-finalists in the 2012 OFC Nations Cup advanced to the third round of World Cup qualifying, regardless of the outcome of the knockout rounds. The final results of the OFC Nations Cup knockout stage matches do count in other ways as part of the World Cup qualifying, with FIFA counting goalscorers in the qualifying statistics, and cards given contributing to suspensions in the third round of World Cup qualifying.

Semi-finals
Tahiti	1
Solomon Islands	0
New Zealand	0
New Caledonia	2

Final
Tahiti	1
New Caledonia	0
Third place
Solomon Islands	3
New Zealand	4

== Third round ==
The four remaining teams played a double round-robin between 7 September 2012 and 26 March 2013, with the top team advancing to the intercontinental play-off.

Note that – unlike the previously announced format – this means the team that advances to the intercontinental play-off may be different from the team that wins the OFC Nations Cup and represents the OFC at the 2013 Confederations Cup.

The draw for the fixtures was conducted at OFC Headquarters in Auckland, New Zealand, on 26 June 2012. The matches were scheduled to take place in the period from 7 September 2012 to 26 March 2013.

Pos	Team	Pld	W	D	L	GF	GA	GD	Pts	Qualification	New Zealand men's national football team	New Caledonia national football team	Tahiti national football team	Solomon Islands national football team
1	New Zealand	6	6	0	0	17	2	+15	18	Advanced to the CONCACAF v OFC play-off	—	2–1	3–0	6–1
2	New Caledonia	6	4	0	2	17	6	+11	12		0–2	—	1–0	5–0
3	Tahiti	6	1	0	5	2	12	−10	3		0–2	0–4	—	2–0
4	Solomon Islands	6	1	0	5	5	21	−16	3		0–2	2–6	2–0	—

== Inter-confederation play-offs ==
The winner of the OFC qualification tournament, New Zealand, played against CONCACAF's fourth-placed team, Mexico, in a home-and-away play-off. Mexico, the winner of this play-off, qualified for the 2014 FIFA World Cup.

The first leg was played on 13 November 2013, and the second leg was played on 20 November 2013.

Team 1	Agg.	Team 2	1st leg	2nd leg
Mexico	9–3	New Zealand	5–1	4–2

== Top goalscorers ==
There were 121 goals scored in 34 matches, for an average of 3.56 goals per match. Note: Statistics include goals scored in the knockout stage of the OFC Nations Cup as these matches are also considered by FIFA as part of the qualifiers.

8 goals

- (New Caledonia) Georges Gope-Fenepej

7 goals

- (New Caledonia) Jacques Haeko
- (New Zealand) Chris Wood

5 goals

- (New Caledonia) Bertrand Kaï
- (New Zealand) Shane Smeltz
- (French Polynesia) Lorenzo Tehau

4 goals

- (New Caledonia) Roy Kayara
- (New Caledonia) César Lolohea
- (Solomon Islands) Benjamin Totori
- (French Polynesia) Alvin Tehau
- (French Polynesia) Jonathan Tehau

3 goals

- (New Zealand) Chris Killen
- (Vanuatu) Robert Tasso

Below are full goalscorer lists for each round:

- First round
- Second round
- Third round
