= Wakanumuné =

Wakanumuné is a surname. Notable people with the surname include:

- Jean-Patrick Wakanumuné (born 1980), New Caledonian footballer
- Joël Wakanumuné (born 1986), New Caledonian footballer, brother of Jean-Patrick
- Loic Wakanumuné (born 1985), New Caledonian footballer
