= 2014 FIFA World Cup qualification =

Tournament details
- Dates: 15 June 2011 – 20 November 2013
- Teams: 203 (from 6 confederations)

Tournament statistics
- Matches played: 820
- Goals scored: 2,344 (2.86 per match)
- Attendance: 17,854,160 (21,773 per match)
- Top scorer(s): (Belize) Deon McCaulay (Netherlands) Robin van Persie (Uruguay) Luis Suárez (11 goals each)

The 2014 FIFA World Cup qualification was a series of tournaments organised by the six FIFA confederations. The 2014 FIFA World Cup featured 32 teams, with one place reserved for the host nation, Brazil. The remaining 31 places were determined by a qualification process, in which the other 207 teams, from the six FIFA confederations, competed. Most of the successful teams were determined within these confederations, with a limited number of inter-confederation play-offs occurring at the end of the process.

Bhutan, Brunei, Guam and Mauritania did not enter, and South Sudan joined FIFA after the qualification process started and therefore could not take part. The qualification process consisted of 820 matches, reduced from 828 after the late withdrawals of the Bahamas and Mauritius.

The first qualification match, between Montserrat and Belize, was played on 15 June 2011, and the Belizean striker Deon McCaulay scored the first goal in qualification. Qualification ended on 20 November 2013, when Uruguay eliminated Jordan to become the final qualifier for the World Cup. Twenty-three of FIFA's 24 top-ranked countries eventually qualified.

== Qualified teams ==
Country qualified for World Cup Country failed to qualify Country did not enter World Cup Country not a FIFA member

Team	Method of qualification	Date of qualification	Finals appearance	Consecutive appearances	Previous best performance	FIFA Ranking (Note: The rankings are shown as of 17 October 2013. These are the rankings used for the final draw.)
Brazil	Host	30 October 2007	20th	20	Winners (1958, 1962, 1970, 1994, 2002)	11
Japan	AFC fourth round Group B winners	4 June 2013	5th	5	Round of 16 (2002, 2010)	44
Australia	AFC fourth round Group B runners-up	18 June 2013	4th	3	Round of 16 (2006)	57
Iran	AFC fourth round Group A winners	18 June 2013	4th	1 (last: 2006)	Group stage (1978, 1998, 2006)	49
South Korea	AFC fourth round Group A runners-up	18 June 2013	9th	8	Fourth place (2002)	56
Netherlands	UEFA Group D winners	10 September 2013	10th	3	Runners-up (1974, 1978, 2010)	8
Italy	UEFA Group B winners	10 September 2013	18th	14	Winners (1934, 1938, 1982, 2006)	9
Costa Rica	CONCACAF fourth round runners-up	10 September 2013	4th	1 (last: 2006)	Round of 16 (1990)	31
United States	CONCACAF fourth round winners	10 September 2013	10th	7	Third place (1930)	13
Argentina	CONMEBOL winners	10 September 2013	16th	11	Winners (1978, 1986)	3
Belgium	UEFA Group A winners	11 October 2013	12th	1 (last: 2002)	Fourth place (1986)	5
Switzerland	UEFA Group E winners	11 October 2013	10th	3	Quarter-finals (1934, 1938, 1954)	7
Germany	UEFA Group C winners	11 October 2013	18th	16	Winners (1954, 1974, 1990)	2
Colombia	CONMEBOL runners-up	11 October 2013	5th	1 (last: 1998)	Round of 16 (1990)	4
Bosnia and Herzegovina	UEFA Group G winners	15 October 2013	1st	1	—	16
Russia	UEFA Group F winners	15 October 2013	10th (Note: This is Russia's third appearance at the FIFA World Cup; however, FIFA considers Russia as the successor team of the Soviet Union.)	1 (last: 2002)	Fourth place (1966) (Note: Russia's best result is group stage in 1994 and 2002; however, FIFA considers Russia as the successor team of the Soviet Union.)	19
England	UEFA Group H Winners	15 October 2013	14th	5	Winners (1966)	10
Spain	UEFA Group I Winners	15 October 2013	14th	10	Winners (2010)	1
Chile	CONMEBOL third place	15 October 2013	9th	2	Third place (1962)	12
Ecuador	CONMEBOL fourth place	15 October 2013	3rd	1 (last: 2006)	Round of 16 (2006)	22
Honduras	CONCACAF fourth round third place	15 October 2013	3rd	2	Group stage (1982, 2010)	34
Nigeria	CAF third round winners	16 November 2013	5th	2	Round of 16 (1994, 1998)	33
Ivory Coast	CAF third round winners	16 November 2013	3rd	3	Group stage (2006, 2010)	17
Cameroon	CAF third round winners	17 November 2013	7th	2	Quarter-finals (1990)	59
Ghana	CAF third round winners	19 November 2013	3rd	3	Quarter-finals (2010)	23
Algeria	CAF third round winners	19 November 2013	4th	2	Group stage (1982, 1986, 2010)	32
Greece	UEFA play-off winners	19 November 2013	3rd	2	Group stage (1994, 2010)	15
Croatia	UEFA play-off winners	19 November 2013	4th	1 (last: 2006)	Third place (1998)	18
Portugal	UEFA play-off winners	19 November 2013	6th	4	Third place (1966)	14
France	UEFA play-off winners	19 November 2013	14th	5	Winners (1998)	21
Mexico	CONCACAF v OFC play-off winners	20 November 2013	15th	6	Quarter-finals (1970, 1986)	24
Uruguay	AFC v CONMEBOL play-off winners	20 November 2013	12th	2	Winners (1930, 1950)	6

12 of the 32 teams subsequently failed to qualify for the 2018 finals: Algeria, Bosnia and Herzegovina, Cameroon, Chile, Ecuador, Ghana, Greece, Honduras, Italy, Ivory Coast, Netherlands and United States.

== Qualification process ==
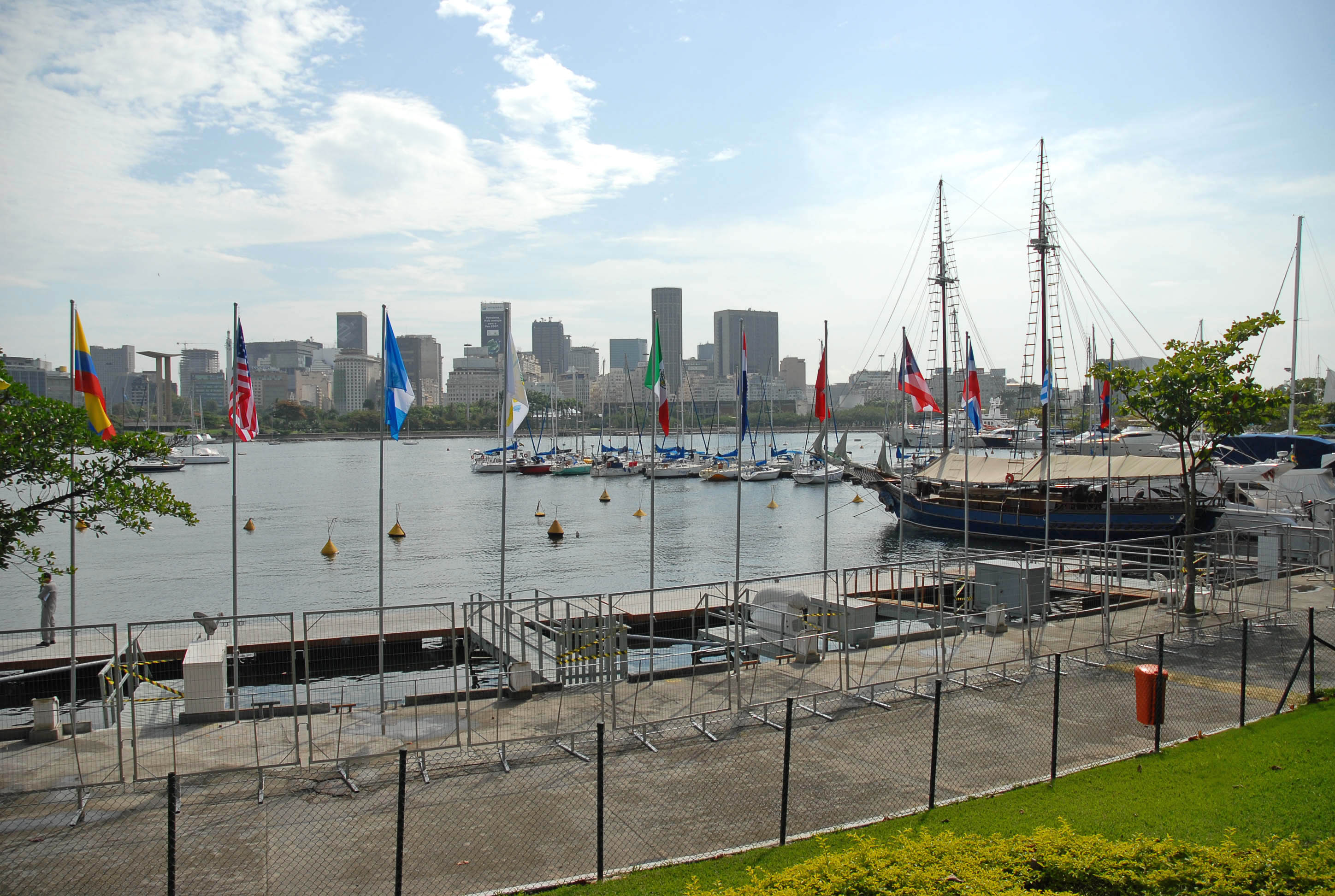
Marina da Glória in Rio de Janeiro hosted the qualification draw

The FIFA Executive Committee decided to approve the change of date for the preliminary draw of the 2014 FIFA World Cup, which was held six months earlier than in the past, to allow the confederations to begin their qualifying competitions in good time. The draw was held on 30 July 2011 at the Marina da Glória in Rio de Janeiro, Brazil.

The distribution by confederation for the 2014 FIFA World Cup is:

- AFC (Asia): 4 or 5 places
- CAF (Africa): 5 places
- CONCACAF (North, Central American and Caribbean): 3 or 4 places
- CONMEBOL (South America): 4 or 5 places (+ Brazil qualified automatically as host nation for a total of 5 or 6 places)
- OFC (Oceania): 0 or 1 place(s)
- UEFA (Europe): 13 places

UEFA and CAF have a guaranteed number of places, whereas the number of qualifiers from other confederations is dependent on play-offs between AFC's fifth-placed team and CONMEBOL's fifth-placed team, and between CONCACAF's fourth-placed team and OFC's first-placed team. A draw determined the pairings between the four teams involved.

=== Summary of qualification ===
Confederation	Available slots in finals	Teams started	Teams eliminated	Teams qualified	Qualifying start date	Qualifying end date
AFC	4 or 5	43	39	4	29 June 2011	20 November 2013
CAF	5	52	47	5	11 November 2011	19 November 2013
CONCACAF	3 or 4	35	31	4	15 June 2011	20 November 2013
CONMEBOL	4+1 or 5+1	9+1	4	5+1	7 October 2011	20 November 2013
OFC	0 or 1	11	11	0	22 November 2011	20 November 2013
UEFA	13	53	40	13	7 September 2012	19 November 2013
Total	31+1	203+1	172	31+1	15 June 2011	20 November 2013

=== Tiebreakers ===
For FIFA World Cup qualifying stages using a league format, the method used for separating teams level on points was the same for all confederations. (Note: The rules for separating teams level on points were decided by FIFA and can be found in article 18 part 6d to 6g of the FIFA Regulations 2014 World Cup Brazil.) If teams were even on points at the end of group play, the tied teams were ranked by:

1. Goal difference in all group matches
2. Greater number of goals scored in all group matches
3. Greater number of points obtained in matches between the tied teams
4. Goal difference in matches between the tied teams
5. Greater number of goals scored in matches between the tied teams
6. Greater number of away goals scored in matches between the tied teams if only two teams were tied

If teams were still equal after applying all listed tiebreakers, then a single play-off at a neutral venue was played. If scores were level after ninety minutes in the play-off, then two fifteen-minute periods of extra time and, if necessary, a penalty shoot-out would determine the winners.

For FIFA World Cup qualifying stages using a home-and-away knockout format, the team that had the higher aggregate score over the two legs progressed to the next round. In the event that aggregate scores finished level, the away goals rule was applied (i.e. the team that scored more goals away from home over the two legs progressed). If away goals were also equal, then thirty minutes of extra time were played, divided into two fifteen-minutes halves. The away goals rule was again applied after extra time (i.e. if there were goals scored during extra time and the aggregate score was still level, the visiting team qualified by virtue of more away goals scored). If no goals were scored during extra time, the tie was decided via a penalty shoot-out.

== Confederation qualification ==
=== AFC ===
Qualification began with two sets of two-leg knockout qualification rounds – the first held on 29 June and 2 July and 3 July 2011 and the second on 23 and 28 July – reducing the number of teams in the main draw to 20. The draw for the first two rounds of qualifiers was held in Kuala Lumpur on 30 March 2011.

As in the 2010 format, the third stage consisted of 5 groups of 4 teams (with matches held between September 2011 and February 2012) with the top 2 in each group advancing to 2 groups of 5 that played a further group stage during 2012. The top two teams in each group qualified for the 2014 World Cup directly, while the two third-placed teams engaged in a play-off tie for a chance to qualify via a further inter-confederation qualifying tie against a team from CONMEBOL.

The qualification process began with 43 national teams (out of 46 AFC members; Bhutan, Brunei and Guam did not enter) vying for four and a half spots. 4 nations have qualified: Japan, Australia, Iran and South Korea. Jordan beat Uzbekistan in round 5 and played Uruguay, the fifth-placed team from CONMEBOL, for the right to qualify, where they were eliminated.

==== Final positions (fourth round) ====
Group A
Pos	Team	Pld	Pts
1	Iran	8	16
2	South Korea	8	14
3	Uzbekistan	8	14
4	Qatar	8	7
5	Lebanon	8	5

Group B
Pos	Team	Pld	Pts
1	Japan	8	17
2	Australia	8	13
3	Jordan	8	10
4	Oman	8	9
5	Iraq	8	5

==== Play-off for 5th place (fifth round) ====
Team 1	Agg.	Team 2	1st leg	2nd leg
Jordan	2–2 (9–8p)	Uzbekistan	1–1	1–1 (a.e.t.)

=== CAF ===
52 out of the 53 national associations affiliated to CAF entered the qualifying tournament to determine the continent's five slots for the next World Cup (only Mauritania failed to enter, while South Sudan joined FIFA after the start of qualifying).

Qualification began with a first round of 12 two-legged knockout ties, which were held between 11 and 16 November 2011. The ties involved the 24 lowest-ranked teams according to FIFA world rankings. The 12 winners joined the remaining 28 CAF entrants in the second round, which consisted of 10 groups of four. The winners of each group – held between June 2012 and September 2013 – advanced to a third round of 5 two-legged knockout ties. The five winners of these ties – held in October and November 2013 – advanced to the 2014 FIFA World Cup finals.

==== Third round ====
Team 1	Agg.	Team 2	1st leg	2nd leg
Ivory Coast	4–2	Senegal	3–1	1–1
Ethiopia	1–4	Nigeria	1–2	0–2
Tunisia	1–4	Cameroon	0–0	1–4
Ghana	7–3	Egypt	6–1	1–2
Burkina Faso	3–3 (a)	Algeria	3–2	0–1

=== CONCACAF ===
In May 2010, the CONCACAF Executive Committee announced a possible change in its qualifying format for the 2014 World Cup, which would start with a preliminary knockout stage followed by three group phases. However, these proposals were abandoned. CONCACAF once again used a six-team final stage (known colloquially as "the Hexagonal"). The ten lowest-ranked nations played two-legged ties, with the five winners joining the nations ranked 7–25 in Round 2. There were six groups of four teams, with the six group winners joining the nations ranked 1–6 in Round 3. There were three groups of four teams and the top two teams in each group advanced to Round 4. These six nations formed one group, with the top three teams qualifying and Mexico, the fourth-placed team, advancing to the inter-continental play-off against New Zealand, the top team from the OFC.

A total of 35 national teams began the qualification process vying for three and a half spots. 31 nations were eliminated and the Bahamas withdrew (because their stadium was not completed in time for the competition).

==== Final positions (fourth round) ====
Pos	Team	Pld	Pts
1	United States	10	22
2	Costa Rica	10	18
3	Honduras	10	15
4	Mexico	10	11
5	Panama	10	8
6	Jamaica	10	5

=== CONMEBOL ===
As Brazil had already qualified as host, the remaining nine CONMEBOL teams took part in a double round-robin group, playing each other twice (home and away) using the same schedule as previous qualification tournaments (each team had a bye on the date they would normally be scheduled to play Brazil). The top four teams qualified automatically, whereas Uruguay, the fifth-placed team, proceeded to the inter-confederational play-off against Jordan, the fifth placed team from Asia.

==== Final positions ====
Pos	Team	Pld	Pts
1	Argentina	16	32
2	Colombia	16	30
3	Chile	16	28
4	Ecuador	16	25
5	Uruguay	16	25
6	Venezuela	16	20
7	Peru	16	15
8	Bolivia	16	12
9	Paraguay	16	12

Source: FIFA

=== OFC ===
The four lowest-ranked nations (American Samoa, Cook Islands, Samoa, and Tonga) competed in the first round of qualifying: a single round-robin tournament in Apia, Samoa, from 22 to 26 November 2011. The winners of the group, Samoa, joined the remaining 7 OFC teams in the 2012 OFC Nations Cup, which also doubled as the second qualifying round. The four semi-finalists of the OFC Nations Cup advanced to the third round, which consisted of a double round-robin held on a home-and-away basis between 7 September 2012 and 26 March 2013.

New Zealand, as the winners of the third round, proceeded to the inter-confederation play-off against Mexico, the fourth-placed team from CONCACAF, where they were eliminated by Mexico, who beat them 9–3 over two legs.

==== Final positions (third round) ====
Pos	Team	Pld	Pts
1	New Zealand	6	18
2	New Caledonia	6	12
3	Tahiti	6	3
4	Solomon Islands	6	3

=== UEFA ===
The European qualification games started in September 2012, after Euro 2012. All 53 national associations affiliated with UEFA took part in the qualification process. In round one, teams competed in eight groups of six teams and a single group of five teams. The nine group winners qualified, while the eight best runners-up – ranked according to all their games except for games against the sixth-placed team in their group – entered into the play-offs for the four remaining spots.

==== Final positions (first round) ====
Group A
Pos	Team	Pld	Pts
1	Belgium	10	26
2	Croatia	10	17
3	Serbia	10	14
4	Scotland	10	11
5	Wales	10	10
6	Macedonia	10	7

Group B
Pos	Team	Pld	Pts
1	Italy	10	22
2	Denmark	10	16
3	Czech Republic	10	15
4	Bulgaria	10	13
5	Armenia	10	13
6	Malta	10	3

Group C
Pos	Team	Pld	Pts
1	Germany	10	28
2	Sweden	10	20
3	Austria	10	17
4	Republic of Ireland	10	14
5	Kazakhstan	10	5
6	Faroe Islands	10	1

Group D
Pos	Team	Pld	Pts
1	Netherlands	10	28
2	Romania	10	19
3	Hungary	10	17
4	Turkey	10	16
5	Estonia	10	7
6	Andorra	10	0

Group E
Pos	Team	Pld	Pts
1	Switzerland	10	24
2	Iceland	10	17
3	Slovenia	10	15
4	Norway	10	12
5	Albania	10	11
6	Cyprus	10	5

Group F
Pos	Team	Pld	Pts
1	Russia	10	22
2	Portugal	10	21
3	Israel	10	14
4	Azerbaijan	10	9
5	Northern Ireland	10	7
6	Luxembourg	10	6

Group G
Pos	Team	Pld	Pts
1	Bosnia and Herzegovina	10	25
2	Greece	10	25
3	Slovakia	10	13
4	Lithuania	10	11
5	Latvia	10	8
6	Liechtenstein	10	2

Group H
Pos	Team	Pld	Pts
1	England	10	22
2	Ukraine	10	21
3	Montenegro	10	15
4	Poland	10	13
5	Moldova	10	11
6	San Marino	10	0

Group I
Pos	Team	Pld	Pts
1	Spain	8	20
2	France	8	17
3	Finland	8	9
4	Georgia	8	5
5	Belarus	8	4

==== Second round ====
The Second Round was contested by the top eight runners-up. The second round draw took place at the headquarters of FIFA in Zürich, Switzerland, on 21 October. October 2013 FIFA World Rankings were used to decide which of the teams were seeded. The matches were played on 15 and 19 November 2013.

==== Group runners-up ====
Pos	Grp	Team	Pld	W	D	L	GF	GA	GD	Pts	Qualification
1	G	Greece	8	6	1	1	9	4	+5	19	Advance to second round (play-offs)
2	I	France	8	5	2	1	15	6	+9	17	Advance to second round (play-offs)
3	F	Portugal	8	4	3	1	15	8	+7	15	Advance to second round (play-offs)
4	H	Ukraine	8	4	3	1	11	4	+7	15	Advance to second round (play-offs)
5	C	Sweden	8	4	2	2	15	13	+2	14	Advance to second round (play-offs)
6	E	Iceland	8	4	2	2	15	14	+1	14	Advance to second round (play-offs)
7	D	Romania	8	4	1	3	11	12	−1	13	Advance to second round (play-offs)
8	A	Croatia	8	3	2	3	9	8	+1	11	Advance to second round (play-offs)
9	B	Denmark	8	2	4	2	9	11	−2	10	

Team 1	Agg.	Team 2	1st leg	2nd leg
Portugal	4–2	Sweden	1–0	3–2
Ukraine	2–3	France	2–0	0–3
Greece	4–2	Romania	3–1	1–1
Iceland	0–2	Croatia	0–0	0–2

== Inter-confederation play-offs ==
There were two scheduled inter-confederation playoffs to determine the final two qualification spots to the finals. The first legs were played on 13 November 2013, and the second legs were played on 20 November 2013.

=== AFC v CONMEBOL ===
Team 1	Agg.	Team 2	1st leg	2nd leg
Jordan	0–5	Uruguay	0–5	0–0

=== CONCACAF v OFC ===
Team 1	Agg.	Team 2	1st leg	2nd leg
Mexico	9–3	New Zealand	5–1	4–2

== Top goalscorers ==
There were 2,344 goals scored in 820 matches, for an average of 2.86 goals per match.

11 goals

- (Belize) Deon McCaulay
- (Netherlands) Robin van Persie
- (Uruguay) Luis Suárez

10 goals

- (Antigua and Barbuda) Peter Byers
- (Argentina) Lionel Messi
- (Bosnia and Herzegovina) Edin Džeko
- (Mexico) Oribe Peralta
- (Panama) Blas Pérez

9 goals

- (Argentina) Gonzalo Higuaín
- (Colombia) Radamel Falcao
- (Honduras) Jerry Bengtson

8 goals

- (Bosnia and Herzegovina) Vedad Ibišević
- (Costa Rica) Álvaro Saborío
- (Germany) Mesut Özil
- (Japan) Shinji Okazaki
- (New Caledonia) Georges Gope-Fenepej
- (Portugal) Cristiano Ronaldo
- (Sweden) Zlatan Ibrahimović
- (United States) Clint Dempsey

Below are goalscorer lists for all confederations and the inter-confederation play-offs:

- AFC
- CAF
- CONCACAF
- CONMEBOL
- OFC
- UEFA
- Inter-confederation play-offs
