= Jean-Patrick Wakanumuné =

New Caledonian footballer (born 1980)

Personal information
- Full name: Jean-Patrick Wakanumuné
- Date of birth: 13 March 1980 (age 46)
- Place of birth: New Caledonia
- Position: Defender

Team information
- Current team: Tiga Sport

Senior career*
Years	Team	Apps	(Gls)
2006–2011	AS Mont-Dore		
2012–2015	AS Magenta		
2016	Hienghène		
2016	AS Magenta		
2017–	Tiga Sport		

International career^{‡}
2007–2013	New Caledonia	25	(0)
Medal record
Men's football
Representing New Caledonia
OFC Nations Cup
Runner-up	2008 Oceania
Runner-up	2012 Solomon Islands
Pacific Games
Gold medal – first place	2007 Samoa
Gold medal – first place	2011 New Caledonia
- * Club domestic league appearances and goals as of 5 June 2018 ‡ National team caps and goals as of 5 June 2018

Jean-Patrick Wakanumuné (born 13 March 1980) is a New Caledonian international footballer who plays as a defender for AS Mont-Dore in the New Caledonia Division Honneur and the New Caledonia national team.

== Personal life ==
His brother is also a footballer, Joël Wakanumuné, who is an international as well.

== Honours ==
New Caledonia

- OFC Nations Cup: Runner-up, 2008, 2012
- Pacific Games: Gold Medalist, 2007, 2011
