= Manaraii Porlier =

Tahitian footballer (born 1989)

Personal information
- Full name: Manaraii Porlier
- Date of birth: 1 December 1989 (age 36)
- Place of birth: Tahiti
- Position: Forward

Team information
- Current team: A.S. Tiare Tahiti
- Number: 10

Senior career*
Years	Team	Apps	(Gls)
2012–2018	AS Excelsior		
2018–	A.S. Tiare Tahiti		(34)

International career
2012–2017	Tahiti	4	(0)
Medal record
Men's football
Representing Tahiti
OFC Nations Cup
Winner	2012 Solomon Islands
- * Club domestic league appearances and goals

Manariitehauroo Porlier (born 1 December 1989) is a Tahitian footballer who plays as a forward for A.S. Tiare Tahiti. He made four appearances for the Tahiti national team.

== International career ==
Porlier made his debut for the Tahiti national team during the 2012 OFC Nations Cup. He appeared in two matches as a substitute.

== Career statistics ==
Tahiti national team
Year	Apps	Goals
2012	2	0
Total	2	0

== Honours ==
Tahiti

- OFC Nations Cup: 2012
