= 2002 OFC Nations Cup qualification =

Qualifier for 2002 OFC Nations Cup

Tournament details
- Dates: 9 March 2002 – 18 March 2002
- Teams: 5

Tournament statistics
- Matches played: 10
- Goals scored: 62 (6.2 per match)
- Top scorer: (New Caledonia) Joris Pibke (9 goals)

The 2002 OFC Nations Cup qualification tournament was a football competition that was played in March 2002 to determine the two of OFC's five lowest-ranked members men's national teams to advance to the 2002 OFC Nations Cup final tournament played in New Zealand in July 2002. The national teams of six OFC member associations entered the qualifying process. Cook Islands withdrew from the competition.

== Qualified teams ==
Team	Qualified as	Qualified on	Previous appearances in tournament (Note: Bold indicates champion for that year. Italic indicates host for that year.)
Papua New Guinea	Qualifying tournament winners	18 March 2002	1 (1980)
New Caledonia	Qualifying tournament runners-up	18 March 2002	2 (1973, 1980)

== Format ==
With the end of the Polynesian and Melanesian Cups between the 2000 and 2002 tournaments, (the two competitions formerly served a secondary function as qualifiers for the OFC Nations Cup), a new format was created to decide the teams which would be accepted for the Nations Cup. Retaining their round-robin group qualifier style, the OFC this time chose to adopt the FIFA rankings to order all the entrants. With New Caledonia not yet a FIFA member, they were placed last by default. The lowest six teams were then made to compete for two places via a round-robin group stage, with the highest-placed two teams qualifying for the Oceania Nations Cup.

The Rankings of all the teams involved in the OFC Nations Cup are below. The positions were taken as of October, 2001, with the eleven ranked teams appearing in the following order:

Teams who automatically entered the 2002 OFC Nations Cup
Team	Rank
Australia (title holders)	48
New Zealand	84
Fiji	123
Tahiti	128
Solomon Islands	134
Vanuatu	169

Teams who entered the 2002 OFC Nations Cup qualifying stage
Team	Rank
Samoa	172
Tonga	175
Cook Islands	176
Papua New Guinea	195
American Samoa	201
New Caledonia	N/A

=== Tiebreakers ===
The ranking of teams in the standings were based on the following criteria (regulations Articles 15):

1. Points (3 points for a win, 1 point for a draw, 0 points for a loss)
2. Overall goal difference
3. Overall goals scored
4. Score from direct
5. Drawing of lots by the OFC Organising Committee

== Schedule ==
Below was the schedule of the 2002 OFC Nations Cup qualification.

Stage	Matchday	Dates
**Qualifying tournament**	Matchday 1	9 March 2002
**Qualifying tournament**	Matchday 2	12 March 2002
**Qualifying tournament**	Matchday 3	14 March 2002
**Qualifying tournament**	Matchday 4	16 March 2002
**Qualifying tournament**	Matchday 5	18 March 2002

== Standings ==
Pos	Team	Pld	W	D	L	GF	GA	GD	Pts	Qualification
1	Papua New Guinea	4	4	0	0	20	2	+18	12	Qualification to 2002 OFC Nations Cup
2	New Caledonia	4	3	0	1	25	4	+21	9	Qualification to 2002 OFC Nations Cup
3	Samoa (H)	4	2	0	2	8	9	−1	6	
4	Tonga	4	1	0	3	7	18	−11	3	
5	American Samoa	4	0	0	4	2	29	−27	0	
6	Cook Islands	0	0	0	0	0	0	0	0	Withdrew

Source: SportingPulse
Rules for classification: Tiebreakers
(H) Hosts

== Matches ==
Before the first group stage began, the Cook Islands withdrew, resulting in the group stage being played between only five nations.

9 March 2002

New Caledonia	10–0	American Samoa
Case 10'; Pibke 11', 40', 54', 58', 70'; Jose 25'; Kauma 36'; Wanakaija 55'; Voudjo 74'	Report

Toleofoa J.B. Soccer Complex, Apia

9 March 2002

Samoa	2–0	Tonga
Timo 52'; Lemana 83'

Toleofoa J.B. Soccer Complex, Apia

12 March 2002

Tonga	7–2	American Samoa
Suli 3', 72', 80'; Maamaloa 5'; Taufahema 19'; Uele 29'; Fifita 39'	(Report)	Atualevao 15'; Afu 70'

Toleofoa J.B. Soccer Complex, Apia

12 March 2002

Papua New Guinea	4–1	New Caledonia
Kombi 31'; Tomda 57'; Aisa 70'; Davani 85'	(Report)	Voudjo 40'

Toleofoa J.B. Soccer Complex, Apia

14 March 2002

Papua New Guinea	5–0	Tonga
Lohai 19'; Moiyap 61'; Davani 70'; Aisa 84'; Andrew Kassam 89'	(Report)

Toleofoa J.B. Soccer Complex, Apia

14 March 2002

Samoa	5–0	American Samoa
Timo 3'; Faaiuaso 24', 68'; Lemana 31'; Fasavalu 48'	(Report)

Toleofoa J.B. Soccer Complex, Apia

16 March 2002

New Caledonia	9–0	Tonga
Faye 17', 85'; Pibke 18', 26', 85'; Voudjo 18'; Kabeu 45'; Kauma 74'; Jose 90'	(Report)

Toleofoa J.B. Soccer Complex, Apia

16 March 2002

Samoa	1–4	Papua New Guinea
Lemana 56'	(Report)	Kombi 20'; Wasi 30'; Elizah 60'; Moiyap 76'

Toleofoa J.B. Soccer Complex, Apia

18 March 2002

Papua New Guinea	7–0	American Samoa
Davani 12', 20', 43'; Posman 32'; Aisa 46'; Lohai 61'; Wasi 90+'	(Report)

Toleofoa J.B. Soccer Complex, Apia

18 March 2002

Samoa	0–5	New Caledonia
	(Report)	Kauma 10'; David Hay 41', 69'; Pibke 59'; Mapou 89'

Toleofoa J.B. Soccer Complex, Apia

Papua New Guinea and New Caledonia progress to the second group stage.

== Statistics ==
=== Goalscorers ===
There were 62 goals scored in 10 matches, for an average of 6.2 goals per match.

9 goals

- (New Caledonia) Joris Pibke

5 goals

- (Papua New Guinea) Reginald Davani

3 goals

- (New Caledonia) Robert Kauma
- (New Caledonia) Tell Voudjo
- (Papua New Guinea) Joe Aisa
- (Samoa) Pualele Lemana
- (Tonga) Amone Suli

2 goals

- (New Caledonia) Yves Faye
- (New Caledonia) David Hay
- (New Caledonia) Jose Euribora Jose
- (Papua New Guinea) Paul Kombi
- (Papua New Guinea) Michael Lohai
- (Papua New Guinea) Francis Moiyap
- (Papua New Guinea) Maori Wasi
- (Samoa) Desmond Faaiuaso
- (Samoa) Ben Timo

1 goal

- (American Samoa) Savaliga Afu
- (American Samoa) Duane Atualevao
- (New Caledonia) Jean-Marc Case
- (New Caledonia) Jamel Kabeu
- (New Caledonia) Marvis Mapou
- (New Caledonia) Michel Wanakaija
- (Papua New Guinea) Selan Elizah
- (Papua New Guinea) Andrew Kassam
- (Papua New Guinea) Tapas Posman
- (Papua New Guinea) Yanding Tomda
- (Samoa) Tama Fasavalu
- (Tonga) Siua Maamaloa
- (Tonga) Klifi Uele
- (Tonga) Heweli Vete Fifita
