= 2014 FIFA World Cup qualification – CONCACAF fourth round =

Football tournament qualifying stage

In the CONCACAF fourth round of qualification for the 2014 FIFA World Cup, the United States, Costa Rica, and Honduras finished in the top three places and qualified directly for the 2014 World Cup. Mexico finished in fourth place and defeated New Zealand in the CONCACAF – OFC play-off to gain a spot in the World Cup. Mexico finished in fourth place ahead of Panama after the United States scored two goals against Panama in stoppage time in the final match of qualifying; had Panama retained its 2–1 lead, they would have finished in fourth place and eliminated Mexico on goals scored, who had qualified for the previous five World Cups.

== Format ==
The fourth round saw the three group winners and the three group runners-up from the third round compete in a single group of six teams. This stage is referred to as the Hexagonal or Hex, and has been used by CONCACAF to determine its World Cup finals entrants since the qualification tournament for the 1998 FIFA World Cup.

The matches were played from 6 February to 15 October 2013. The top three teams advanced to the World Cup finals tournament in Brazil, and the fourth-placed team advanced to a play-off against New Zealand, the winner of the Oceania qualifiers.

== Qualified teams ==
The qualifiers for this round were determined by 16 October 2012.

Group A	Group B	Group C
United States; Jamaica	Mexico; Costa Rica	Honduras; Panama

== Standings ==
Pos	Team	Pld	W	D	L	GF	GA	GD	Pts	Qualification	United States	Costa Rica	Honduras	Mexico	Panama	Jamaica
1	United States	10	7	1	2	15	8	+7	22	Qualification to 2014 FIFA World Cup	—	1–0	1–0	2–0	2–0	2–0
2	Costa Rica	10	5	3	2	13	7	+6	18	Qualification to 2014 FIFA World Cup	3–1	—	1–0	2–1	2–0	2–0
3	Honduras	10	4	3	3	13	12	+1	15	Qualification to 2014 FIFA World Cup	2–1	1–0	—	2–2	2–2	2–0
4	Mexico	10	2	5	3	7	9	−2	11	Advance to inter-confederation play-offs	0–0	0–0	1–2	—	2–1	0–0
5	Panama	10	1	5	4	10	14	−4	8		2–3	2–2	2–0	0–0	—	0–0
6	Jamaica	10	0	5	5	5	13	−8	5		1–2	1–1	2–2	0–1	1–1	—

== Matches ==
The representative from the six national associations met together on 19 October 2012, but could not agree on the schedule for the fourth round. The draw for the fixtures was conducted by CONCACAF and FIFA on 7 November 2012, in Miami Beach, Florida.

6 February 2013
15:00 UTC−6

Honduras	2–1	United States
J. García 40'; Bengtson 79'	Report	Dempsey 36'

Estadio Olímpico Metropolitano, San Pedro Sula
Attendance: 32,000
Referee: Wálter Quesada (Costa Rica)
6 February 2013
21:00 UTC−5

Panama	2–2	Costa Rica
Henríquez 15'; R. Torres 27'	Report	Saborío 39'; Ruiz 84'

Estadio Rommel Fernández, Panama City
Attendance: 25,000
Referee: Francisco Chacón (Mexico)
6 February 2013
20:30 UTC−6

Mexico	0–0	Jamaica
	Report

Estadio Azteca, Mexico City
Attendance: 43,002
Referee: Mark Geiger (United States)

22 March 2013
15:05 UTC−6

Honduras	2–2	Mexico
Costly 77'; Bengtson 80'	Report	Hernández 28', 54'

Estadio Olímpico Metropolitano, San Pedro Sula
Attendance: 38,500
Referee: Courtney Campbell (Jamaica)
22 March 2013
20:30 UTC−5

Jamaica	1–1	Panama
Elliott 23'	Report	Henríquez 66'

Independence Park, Kingston
Attendance: 25,000
Referee: Héctor Rodríguez (Honduras)
22 March 2013
20:11 UTC−6

United States	1–0	Costa Rica
Dempsey 16'	Report

Dick's Sporting Goods Park, Commerce City
Attendance: 19,374
Referee: Joel Aguilar (El Salvador)

26 March 2013
20:00 UTC−6

Costa Rica	2–0	Jamaica
Umaña 22'; Calvo 82'	Report

Estadio Nacional de Costa Rica, San José
Attendance: 32,427
Referee: Enrico Wijngaarde (Suriname)
26 March 2013
21:00 UTC−5

Panama	2–0	Honduras
Tejada 1'; Pérez 74'	Report

Estadio Rommel Fernández, Panama City
Attendance: 18,253
Referee: Jair Marrufo (United States)
26 March 2013
20:30 UTC−6

Mexico	0–0	United States
	Report

Estadio Azteca, Mexico City
Attendance: 85,500
Referee: Walter López (Guatemala)

4 June 2013 (Note: The fixture Jamaica v Mexico on 18 June was moved to 4 June to allow Mexico to participate in the 2013 FIFA Confederations Cup.)
20:35 UTC−5

Jamaica	0–1	Mexico
	Report	De Nigris 48'

Independence Park, Kingston
Attendance: 16,483
Referee: Joel Aguilar (El Salvador)

7 June 2013
20:30 UTC−5

Jamaica	1–2	United States
Beckford 89'	Report	Altidore 30'; Evans 90+2'

Independence Park, Kingston
Attendance: 12,130
Referee: Roberto Moreno (Panama)
7 June 2013
21:05 UTC−5

Panama	0–0	Mexico
	Report

Estadio Rommel Fernández, Panama City
Attendance: 27,100
Referee: Wálter Quesada (Costa Rica)
7 June 2013
20:10 UTC−6

Costa Rica	1–0	Honduras
Miller 25'	Report

Estadio Nacional de Costa Rica, San José
Attendance: 35,000
Referee: Walter López (Guatemala)

11 June 2013
19:00 UTC−5

Mexico	0–0	Costa Rica
	Report

Estadio Azteca, Mexico City
Attendance: 65,753
Referee: Mark Geiger (United States)
11 June 2013
19:00 UTC−6

Honduras	2–0	Jamaica
O. García 10'; Rojas 88'	Report

Estadio Nacional Carías Andino, Tegucigalpa
Attendance: 29,000
Referee: Marco Rodríguez (Mexico)
11 June 2013
19:08 UTC−7

United States	2–0	Panama
Altidore 36'; E. Johnson 53'	Report

CenturyLink Field, Seattle
Attendance: 40,847
Referee: Roberto García (Mexico)

18 June 2013
19:06 UTC−6

United States	1–0	Honduras
Altidore 73'	Report

Rio Tinto Stadium, Sandy
Attendance: 20,250
Referee: Enrico Wijngaarde (Suriname)
18 June 2013
20:00 UTC−6

Costa Rica	2–0	Panama
Ruiz 49'; Borges 52'	Report

Estadio Nacional de Costa Rica, San José
Attendance: 35,000
Referee: Courtney Campbell (Jamaica)

6 September 2013
20:30 UTC−5

Mexico	1–2	Honduras
Peralta 6'	Report	Bengtson 63'; Costly 66'

Estadio Azteca, Mexico City
Attendance: 73,981
Referee: Roberto Moreno (Panama)
6 September 2013
20:00 UTC−6

Costa Rica	3–1	United States
Acosta 2'; Borges 9'; Campbell 75'	Report	Dempsey 43' (pen.)

Estadio Nacional de Costa Rica, San José
Attendance: 35,000
Referee: Marco Rodríguez (Mexico)
6 September 2013
21:00 UTC−5

Panama	0–0	Jamaica
	Report

Estadio Rommel Fernández, Panama City
Attendance: 20,000
Referee: Walter López (Guatemala)

10 September 2013
19:00 UTC−5

Jamaica	1–1	Costa Rica
Anderson 90+2'	Report	Brenes 74'

Independence Park, Kingston
Attendance: 6,100
Referee: Jair Marrufo (United States)
10 September 2013
20:06 UTC−5

United States	2–0	Mexico
E. Johnson 49'; Donovan 78'	Report

Columbus Crew Stadium, Columbus
Attendance: 24,584
Referee: Courtney Campbell (Jamaica)
10 September 2013
19:00 UTC−6

Honduras	2–2	Panama
Costly 28'; Palacios 62'	Report	G. Torres 50'; Chen 90+1'

Estadio Nacional Carías Andino, Tegucigalpa
Attendance: 26,582
Referee: Mark Geiger (United States)

11 October 2013
15:00 UTC−6

Honduras	1–0	Costa Rica
Bengtson 64'	Report

Estadio Olímpico Metropolitano, San Pedro Sula
Attendance: 38,500
Referee: Jair Marrufo (United States)
11 October 2013
17:36 UTC−5

United States	2–0	Jamaica
Zusi 77'; Altidore 81'	Report

Sporting Park, Kansas City
Attendance: 18,467
Referee: Elmer Bonilla (El Salvador)
11 October 2013
20:30 UTC−5

Mexico	2–1	Panama
Peralta 39'; Jiménez 85'	Report	Tejada 81'

Estadio Azteca, Mexico City
Attendance: 90,758
Referee: Joel Aguilar (El Salvador)

15 October 2013
19:30 UTC−6

Costa Rica	2–1	Mexico
Ruiz 24'; Saborío 63'	Report	Peralta 28'

Estadio Nacional de Costa Rica, San José
Attendance: 35,000
Referee: Walter López (Guatemala)
15 October 2013
20:30 UTC−5

Jamaica	2–2	Honduras
Claros 3' (o.g.); Austin 59' (pen.)	Report	Costly 2'; Figueroa 32'

Independence Park, Kingston
Attendance: 6,000
Referee: Mark Geiger (United States)
15 October 2013
20:30 UTC−5

Panama	2–3	United States
G. Torres 18'; Tejada 83'	Report	Orozco 64'; Zusi 90+2'; Jóhannsson 90+3'

Estadio Rommel Fernández, Panama City
Attendance: 18,254
Referee: Courtney Campbell (Jamaica)

== Goalscorers ==
There were 63 goals scored in 30 matches, for an average of 2.1 goals per match.

4 goals

- (Honduras) Jerry Bengtson
- (Honduras) Carlo Costly
- (United States) Jozy Altidore

3 goals

- (Costa Rica) Bryan Ruiz
- (Mexico) Oribe Peralta
- (Panama) Luis Tejada
- (United States) Clint Dempsey

2 goals

- (Costa Rica) Celso Borges
- (Costa Rica) Álvaro Saborío
- (Mexico) Javier Hernández
- (Panama) Luis Henríquez
- (Panama) Gabriel Torres
- (United States) Eddie Johnson
- (United States) Graham Zusi

1 goal

- (Costa Rica) Jhonny Acosta
- (Costa Rica) Randall Brenes
- (Costa Rica) Diego Calvo
- (Costa Rica) Joel Campbell
- (Costa Rica) Roy Miller
- (Costa Rica) Michael Umaña
- (Honduras) Maynor Figueroa
- (Honduras) Juan Carlos García
- (Honduras) Óscar García
- (Honduras) Wilson Palacios
- (Honduras) Roger Rojas
- (Jamaica) Jermaine Anderson
- (Jamaica) Rodolph Austin
- (Jamaica) Jermaine Beckford
- (Jamaica) Marvin Elliott
- (Mexico) Raúl Jiménez
- (Mexico) Aldo de Nigris
- (Panama) Roberto Chen
- (Panama) Blas Pérez
- (Panama) Román Torres
- (United States) Landon Donovan
- (United States) Brad Evans
- (United States) Aron Jóhannsson
- (United States) Michael Orozco

1 own goal

- (Honduras) Jorge Claros (against Jamaica)
