= Joris Pibke =

New Caledonian footballer

Personal information
- Position: Forward

Senior career*
Years	Team	Apps	(Gls)
- AS Le Mont-Dore

International career
2000–2002	New Caledonia	5	(11)
- * Club domestic league appearances and goals

Joris Pibke is a New Caledonian former international footballer who played as a forward. He is one of his country's top scorers, and in 2002 was one of the top international goalscorers worldwide.

== Career statistics ==
=== International ===
National team	Year	Apps	Goals
New Caledonia	2000	2	2
New Caledonia	2002	3	9
Total		5	11

=== International goals ===
Scores and results list New Caledonia's goal tally first.

No	Date	Venue	Opponent	Score	Result	Competition
1.	8 April 2000	Suva, Fiji	Solomon Islands	4–1	4–2	2000 Melanesia Cup
2.	11 April 2000	Suva, Fiji	Papua New Guinea	?–?	6–1	2000 Melanesia Cup
3.	9 March 2002	Toleafoa JS Blatter National Stadium, Apia, Samoa	American Samoa	2–0	10–0	2002 OFC Nations Cup qualification
4.	9 March 2002	Toleafoa JS Blatter National Stadium, Apia, Samoa	American Samoa	5–0	10–0	2002 OFC Nations Cup qualification
5.	9 March 2002	Toleafoa JS Blatter National Stadium, Apia, Samoa	American Samoa	6–0	10–0	2002 OFC Nations Cup qualification
6.	9 March 2002	Toleafoa JS Blatter National Stadium, Apia, Samoa	American Samoa	8–0	10–0	2002 OFC Nations Cup qualification
7.	9 March 2002	Toleafoa JS Blatter National Stadium, Apia, Samoa	American Samoa	9–0	10–0	2002 OFC Nations Cup qualification
8.	16 March 2002	Toleafoa JS Blatter National Stadium, Apia, Samoa	Tonga	2–0	9–0	2002 OFC Nations Cup qualification
9.	16 March 2002	Toleafoa JS Blatter National Stadium, Apia, Samoa	Tonga	4–0	9–0	2002 OFC Nations Cup qualification
10.	16 March 2002	Toleafoa JS Blatter National Stadium, Apia, Samoa	Tonga	8–0	9–0	2002 OFC Nations Cup qualification
11.	18 March 2002	Toleafoa JS Blatter National Stadium, Apia, Samoa	Samoa	3–0	5–0	2002 OFC Nations Cup qualification
