= Kalaje Gnipate =

New Caledonian footballer (born 1985)

Kalaje Gnipate (born 24 July 1985) is a New Caledonian international footballer for AS Mont-Dore and the New Caledonia national team. He played in the 2012 OFC Nations Cup.

== Career statistics ==
=== International ===
Appearances and goals by national team and year
National team	Year	Apps	Goals
New Caledonia	2008	1	0
New Caledonia	2009	–	
New Caledonia	2010	–	
New Caledonia	2011	–	
New Caledonia	2012	1	1
New Caledonia	2013	2	0
Total		4	1

Scores and results list New Caledonia's goal tally first, score column indicates score after each Gnipate goal.

List of international goals scored by Kalaje Gnipate
No.	Date	Venue	Opponent	Score	Result	Competition
1	5 June 2012	Lawson Tama Stadium, Honiara, Solomon Islands	Samoa	6–0	9–0	2012 OFC Nations Cup
