= Tapas Posman =

Papua New Guinean footballer

Personal information
- Full name: Tapas Posman
- Date of birth: 16 October 1973 (age 53)
- Place of birth: Papua New Guinea
- Position: Goalkeeper

Senior career*
Years	Team	Apps	(Gls)
2002–2004	Sobou	?	(?)
2004–2011	Rapatona	?	(?)

International career
2003–2004	Papua New Guinea	6	(1)
- * Club domestic league appearances and goals

Tapas Posman (born 16 October 1973) is a former Papua New Guinean footballer who plays as a goalkeeper. He has won six caps for the Papua New Guinea national football team.
