= 2014 FIFA World Cup qualification (inter-confederation play-offs) =

Tournament details
- Dates: 13–20 November 2013
- Teams: 4 (from 4 confederations)

Tournament statistics
- Matches played: 4
- Goals scored: 17 (4.25 per match)
- Attendance: 214,408 (53,602 per match)
- Top scorer(s): (Mexico) Oribe Peralta (5 goals)

For the 2014 FIFA World Cup qualification, there were two scheduled inter-confederation play-offs to determine the final two qualification spots to the 2014 FIFA World Cup.

== Format ==
The four teams from the four confederations (AFC, CONCACAF, CONMEBOL, and OFC) were drawn into two ties at the World Cup Preliminary Draw at the Marina da Glória in Rio de Janeiro, Brazil, on 30 July 2011. This was different from previous editions, where the matchups were decided by FIFA beforehand and no draw was held for the inter-confederation play-offs.

In each tie, the two teams played a two-legged home-and-away series. The two winners, decided on aggregate score, qualified for the 2014 FIFA World Cup in Brazil.

== Qualified teams ==
Confederation	Placement	Team
AFC	Fifth round (play-off) winner	Jordan
CONCACAF	Fourth round 4th place	Mexico
CONMEBOL	Round-robin 5th place	Uruguay
OFC	Third round winner	New Zealand

== Matches ==
The first legs were played on 13 November 2013, and the second legs were played on 20 November 2013.

=== AFC v CONMEBOL ===
Team 1	Agg.	Team 2	1st leg	2nd leg
Jordan	0–5	Uruguay	0–5	0–0

13 November 2013
18:00 UTC+3

Jordan	0–5	Uruguay
	Report	M. Pereira 22'; Stuani 42'; Lodeiro 69'; Rodríguez 78'; Cavani 90+1'

Amman International Stadium, Amman
Attendance: 17,370
Referee: Svein Oddvar Moen (Norway)
20 November 2013
21:00 UTC−2

Uruguay	0–0	Jordan
	Report

Estadio Centenario, Montevideo
Attendance: 62,000
Referee: Jonas Eriksson (Sweden)

Uruguay won 5–0 on aggregate and qualified for the 2014 FIFA World Cup.

=== CONCACAF v OFC ===
Team 1	Agg.	Team 2	1st leg	2nd leg
Mexico	9–3	New Zealand	5–1	4–2

13 November 2013
14:30 UTC−6

Mexico	5–1	New Zealand
Aguilar 32'; Jiménez 40'; Peralta 48', 80'; Márquez 84'	Report	James 85'

Estadio Azteca, Mexico City
Attendance: 99,832
Referee: Viktor Kassai (Hungary)
20 November 2013
19:00 UTC+13

New Zealand	2–4	Mexico
James 80' (pen.); Fallon 83'	Report	Peralta 14', 29', 33'; Peña 87'

Westpac Stadium, Wellington
Attendance: 35,206
Referee: Felix Brych (Germany)

Mexico won 9–3 on aggregate and qualified for the 2014 FIFA World Cup.

== Goalscorers ==
There were 17 goals scored in 4 matches, for an average of 4.25 goals per match.

5 goals

- (Mexico) Oribe Peralta

2 goals

- (New Zealand) Chris James

1 goal

- (Mexico) Paul Aguilar
- (Mexico) Raúl Jiménez
- (Mexico) Rafael Márquez
- (Mexico) Carlos Peña
- (New Zealand) Rory Fallon
- (Uruguay) Edinson Cavani
- (Uruguay) Nicolás Lodeiro
- (Uruguay) Maxi Pereira
- (Uruguay) Cristian Rodríguez
- (Uruguay) Cristhian Stuani
