= Rocky Nyikeine =

New Caledonian footballer (born 1992)

Personal information
- Full name: Rocky Sandners Volo Nyikeine
- Date of birth: 26 May 1992 (age 34)
- Place of birth: Nouméa, New Caledonia
- Height: 1.77 m (5 ft 10 in)
- Position: Goalkeeper

Team information
- Current team: Hienghène Sport
- Number: 1

Senior career*
Years	Team	Apps	(Gls)
2011–2016	Gaïtcha FCN		
2016–	Hienghène Sport		

International career^{‡}
2011–	New Caledonia	31	(0)
Medal record
Men's football
Representing New Caledonia
OFC Nations Cup
Runner-up	2012 Solomon Islands
Pacific Games
Gold medal – first place	2011 New Caledonia
Gold medal – first place	2023 Solomon Islands
Silver medal – second place	2019 Samoa
MSG Prime Minister's Cup
Runner-up	2023 New Caledonia
- * Club domestic league appearances and goals ‡ National team caps and goals as of 8 October 2025

Rocky Sandners Volo Nyikeine (born 26 May 1992) is a New Caledonian international footballer for who plays as goalkeeper for Hienghène Sport and the New Caledonia national team. He played in the 2012 OFC Nations Cup.

== Honours ==
Hienghène Sport

- OFC Champions League: 2019

New Caledonia

- OFC Nations Cup: Runner-up, 2012
- Pacific Games: Gold Medalist, 2011, 2023; Silver Medalist, 2019
- MSG Prime Minister's Cup: Runner-up, 2023

Individual

- OFC Nations Cup golden glove: 2012
- OFC Champions League golden glove: 2019
