= Robert Tasso =

Vanuatuan footballer

Personal information
- Date of birth: 18 December 1989 (age 36)
- Place of birth: Vanuatu
- Position: Striker

Team information
- Current team: Tafea
- Number: 11

Senior career*
Years	Team	Apps	(Gls)
2007–2012	Spirit 08		
2012–2013	Rewa		
2013–	Tafea		

International career^{‡}
2012–	Vanuatu U23	5	(3)
2011–	Vanuatu	7	(5)
- * Club domestic league appearances and goals as of 21:26, 4 October 2014 (UTC) ‡ National team caps and goals as of 09:37, 4 October 2014 (UTC)

Robert Tasso (born 18 December 1989) is a Vanuatuan association footballer. He currently plays for Tafea and the Vanuatu national football team, as a forward.

== International career ==
Tasso made his debut for Vanuatu on 8 July 2011, in the 2–1 defeat to Solomon Islands. He has seven caps for the national team, five of these coming in July 2011. The two other international appearances both came in the 2011 Pacific Games in August and September 2011. He has scored twice for Vanuatu, against Fiji on 15 July 2011 and then against Guam in a 4–1 win on 3 September 2011.

== Career statistics ==
=== International ===
Appearances and goals by national team and year
National team	Year	Apps	Goals
Vanuatu	2011	8	3
Vanuatu	2012	3	3
Vanuatu	2016	1	0
Total		12	6

Scores and results list Vanuatu's goal tally first, score column indicates score after each Tasso goal.

List of international goals scored by Robert Tasso
No.	Date	Venue	Opponent	Score	Result	Competition	Ref.
1	15 July 2011	Churchill Park, Lautoka, Fiji	Fiji	2–0	2–1	Friendly	
2	3 September 2011	Stade Rivière Salée, Nouméa, New Caledonia	Guam	1–1	4–1	2011 Pacific Games	
3	3 September 2011	Stade Rivière Salée, Nouméa, New Caledonia	Guam	2–1	4–1	2011 Pacific Games	
4	1 June 2012	Lawson Tama Stadium, Honiara, Solomon Islands	New Caledonia	1–1	2–5	2012 OFC Nations Cup	
5	3 June 2012	Lawson Tama Stadium, Honiara, Solomon Islands	Samoa	4–0	5–0	2012 OFC Nations Cup	
6	5 June 2012	Lawson Tama Stadium, Honiara, Solomon Islands	Tahiti	1–4	1–4	2012 OFC Nations Cup	
