= Judikael Ixoée =

New Caledonian footballer (born 1990)

Personal information
- Full name: Judikael Ixoée
- Date of birth: 17 March 1990 (age 36)
- Place of birth: Païta, New Caledonia
- Position: Right-back

Team information
- Current team: Carqueiranne

Senior career*
Years	Team	Apps	(Gls)
2009	AS Kirikitr.		
2010–2012	Magenta		
2012–2013	Hyères		
2013–	Carqueiranne		

International career^{‡}
2011–	New Caledonia	14	(1)
Medal record
Men's football
Representing New Caledonia
OFC Nations Cup
Runner-up	2012 Solomon Islands
Pacific Games
Gold medal – first place	2011 New Caledonia
- * Club domestic league appearances and goals as of 30 May 2016 ‡ National team caps and goals as of 30 May 2016

Judikael Ixoée (born 17 March 1990) is a New Caledonian international footballer who plays as a right-back for the French side Carqueiranne and for the New Caledonia national team. He played in the 2012 OFC Nations Cup.

== Honours ==
New Caledonia

- OFC Nations Cup: Runner-up, 2012
- Pacific Games: Gold Medalist, 2011
