= Joël Wakanumuné =

New Caledonian footballer (born 1986)

Personal information
- Full name: Joël Wapaeat Wakanumuné
- Date of birth: 30 September 1986 (age 40)
- Place of birth: Nouméa, New Caledonia
- Position: Midfielder

Team information
- Current team: AS Tiga Sports

Senior career*
Years	Team	Apps	(Gls)
2002–2005	Mont-Dore		
2005–2006	Poitiers		
2006–2008	Nevers		
2008–2009	Mont-Dore		
2009	Jura Sud		
2010–2011	SN Imphy Decize		
2011–2014	Chambéry	32	(1)
2014–2016	Aix	33	(0)
2016	Magenta		
2017	AS Auteuil		
2018–	AS Tiga Sport		

International career^{‡}
2011–2022	New Caledonia	39	(1)
Medal record
Men's football
Representing New Caledonia
OFC Nations Cup
Runner-up	2012 Solomon Islands
Pacific Games
Gold medal – first place	2011 New Caledonia
Silver medal – second place	2019 Samoa
- * Club domestic league appearances and goals as of 2 May 2018 ‡ National team caps and goals as of 24 March 2022

Joël Wakanumuné (born 30 September 1986) is a New Caledonian international footballer who plays for the New Caledonian side Magenta in the New Caledonia Super Ligue, and the New Caledonia national team.

Wakanumuné represented New Caledonia in ten qualifying matches for the 2014 FIFA World Cup, as well as the 2012 OFC Nations Cup. He also appeared in the OFC Nations Cup final, in which New Caledonia lost 1-0 to Tahiti.

His brother is the footballer Jean-Patrick Wakanumuné, who plays for the New Caledonian club Gaïtcha FCN.

== Honours ==
New Caledonia

- OFC Nations Cup: runner-up 2012
- Pacific Games: Gold Medalist, 2011; Silver Medalist, 2019
