= César Zeoula =

New Caledonian footballer (born 1989)

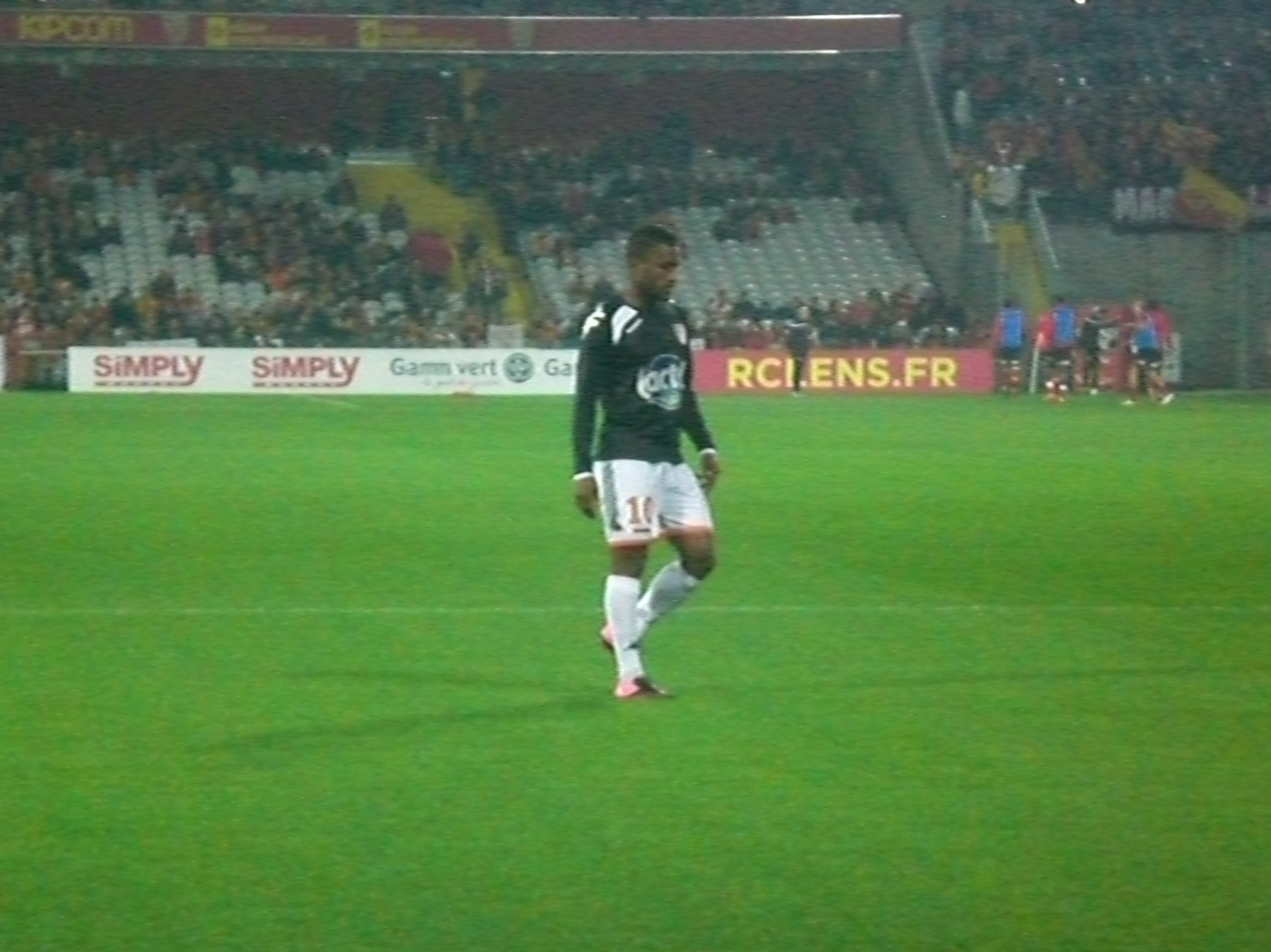
- Zeoula with Laval in 2015

Personal information
- Date of birth: 29 August 1989 (age 37)
- Place of birth: Dumbéa, New Caledonia
- Height: 1.73 m (5 ft 8 in)
- Position: Winger

Team information
- Current team: US Chauvigny
- Number: 10

Senior career*
Years	Team	Apps	(Gls)
2008–2009	A.S. Lito		
2010	Le Mont-Dore		
2011	A.S. Magenta		
2011–2018	Laval	116	(9)
2017	→ Créteil (loan)	10	(1)
2018–2020	SC Schiltigheim	43	(8)
2020–2021	Saint-Louis Neuweg	0	(0)
2021–2022	UA Cognac	12	(6)
2022–	US Chauvigny	108	(21)

International career^{‡}
2008–	New Caledonia	47	(13)
Medal record
Men's football
Representing New Caledonia
Pacific Games
Gold medal – first place	2011 New Caledonia
Gold medal – first place	2023 Solomon Islands
Silver medal – second place	2019 Samoa
- * Club domestic league appearances and goals as of 4 October 2026 ‡ National team caps and goals as of 26 March 2026

César Zeoula (born 29 August 1989), formerly known as César Lolohéa, is a New Caledonian international footballer who plays as a midfielder for US Chauvigny and the New Caledonia national team.

He has also played for Magenta, Lito and Mont-Dore in the New Caledonia Division Honneur.

== International goals ==
As of match played 24 March 2025. New Caledonia score listed first, score column indicates score after each Zeoula goal.

International goals by date, venue, cap, opponent, score, result and competition
No.	Date	Venue	Cap	Opponent	Score	Result	Competition
1	30 September 2008	Stade Léo Lagrange, Besançon, France	3	Martinique	1–0	1–1	2008 Coupe de l'Outre-Mer
2	4 May 2011	Stade Numa-Daly, Nouméa, New Caledonia	11	Réunion	1–2	2–4	Friendly
3	27 August 2011	Stade Rivière Salée, Nouméa, New Caledonia	13	Vanuatu	4–0	5–0	2011 Pacific Games
4	1 September 2011	Stade Rivière Salée, Nouméa, New Caledonia	15	Tuvalu	6–0	8–0	2011 Pacific Games
5	16 October 2012	Stade Numa-Daly, Nouméa, New Caledonia	22	Solomon Islands	4–0	5–0	2014 FIFA World Cup qualification
6	16 October 2012	Stade Numa-Daly, Nouméa, New Caledonia	22	Solomon Islands	5–0	5–0	2014 FIFA World Cup qualification
7	22 March 2013	Forsyth Barr Stadium, Dunedin, New Zealand	23	New Zealand	1–1	1–2	2014 FIFA World Cup qualification
8	26 March 2013	Stade Numa-Daly, Nouméa, New Caledonia	24	Tahiti	1–0	1–0	2014 FIFA World Cup qualification
9	1 June 2016	Sir John Guise Stadium, Port Moresby, Papua New Guinea	26	Samoa	4–0	7–0	2016 OFC Nations Cup
10	15 July 2019	National Soccer Stadium, Apia, Samoa	34	Tahiti	3–0	3–0	2019 Pacific Games
11	18 November 2023	SIFF Academy Field, Honiara, Solomon Islands	37	Tonga	3–0	7–0	2023 Pacific Games
12	24 November 2023	SIFF Academy Field, Honiara, Solomon Islands	38	Cook Islands	1–0	8–0	2023 Pacific Games
13	24 November 2023	SIFF Academy Field, Honiara, Solomon Islands	38	Cook Islands	2–0	8–0	2023 Pacific Games

== Honours ==
New Caledonia

- Pacific Games: Gold Medalist, 2011, 2023; Silver Medalist 2019
