= Roy Kayara =

New Caledonian footballer (born 1990)

Personal information
- Full name: Roy Judicaël Kayara
- Date of birth: 2 May 1990 (age 36)
- Place of birth: Hienghène, New Caledonia
- Height: 1.71 m (5 ft 7 in)
- Position: Defender

Team information
- Current team: Hienghène Sport
- Number: 13

Youth career
- 2007–2009: Hienghène Sport

Senior career*
Years	Team	Apps	(Gls)
2010–2011	Magenta		
2011–2013	Hienghène Sport		
2013–2014	Team Wellington	12	(0)
2014–2015	Hienghène Sport		
2015	A.S. Pirae		
2015–2017	Hienghène Sport		
2017–2018	Team Wellington	13	(3)
2018–	Hienghène Sport		

International career^{‡}
2011–2019	New Caledonia	31	(8)
Medal record
Men's football
Representing New Caledonia
OFC Nations Cup
Runner-up	2012 Solomon Islands
- * Club domestic league appearances and goals as of 29 November 2018 ‡ National team caps and goals as of 21 March 2019

Roy Judicaël Kayara (born 2 May 1990) is a New Caledonian footballer who plays as a defender for Hienghène Sport. He is a member of the New Caledonia national football team.

Before the beginning of the 2013–14 season, Kayara was on trial with Sheffield United during their tour of Scotland. He made appearances against Cowdenbeath, Greenock Morton and Raith Rovers.

== International goals ==
As of matches played 21 March 2019. New Caledonia score listed first, score column indicates score after each Kayara goal.

International goals by date, venue, cap, opponent, score, result and competition
No.	Date	Venue	Cap	Opponent	Score	Result	Competition
1	1 June 2012	Lawson Tama Stadium, Honiara, Solomon Islands	5	Vanuatu	5–2	5–2	2012 OFC Nations Cup
2	5 June 2012	Lawson Tama Stadium, Honiara, Solomon Islands	7	Samoa	1–0	9–0	2012 OFC Nations Cup
3	12 October 2012	Lawson Tama Stadium, Honiara, Solomon Islands	14	Solomon Islands	1–0	6–2	2014 FIFA World Cup qualification
4	16 October 2012	Stade Numa-Daly Magenta, Nouméa, New Caledonia	15	Solomon Islands	2–0	5–0	2014 FIFA World Cup qualification
5	31 June 2016	Sir John Guise Stadium, Port Moresby, Papua New Guinea	20	Samoa	1–0	7–0	2016 OFC Nations Cup
6	31 June 2016	Sir John Guise Stadium, Port Moresby, Papua New Guinea	20	Samoa	3–0	7–0	2016 OFC Nations Cup
7	5 October 2016	Lawson Tama Stadium, Honiara, New Caledonia	24	Solomon Islands	2–0	3–0	Friendly
8	21 March 2019	Churchill Park, Lautoka, Fiji	31	Mauritius	1–0	1–3	Friendly

== Honours ==
New Caledonia

- OFC Nations Cup: runner-up 2012
