= Jacques Haeko =

New Caledonian footballer (born 1984)

Personal information
- Date of birth: 23 April 1984 (age 42)
- Place of birth: New Caledonia
- Position: Striker

Senior career*
Years	Team	Apps	(Gls)
2008–2015	AS Lössi		

International career^{‡}
2011–2012	New Caledonia	12	(9)
Medal record
Men's football
Representing New Caledonia
OFC Nations Cup
Runner-up	2012 Solomon Islands
Pacific Games
Gold medal – first place	2011 New Caledonia
- * Club domestic league appearances and goals as of 4 June 2018 ‡ National team caps and goals as of 4 June 2018

Jacques Haeko (born 23 April 1984) is a New Caledonian footballer who plays as a striker for AS Lössi in the New Caledonia Division Honneur.

== International career ==
He has represented New Caledonia at the senior level. Most notably he was the top scorer in 2012 OFC Nations Cup where he scored 6 goals and was the best goal scorer in the tournament.

== Career statistics ==
=== International ===
Appearances and goals by national team and year
National team	Year	Apps	Goals
New Caledonia	2011	3	2
New Caledonia	2012	10	7
Total		13	9

Scores and results list New Caledonia's goal tally first, score column indicates score after each Haeko goal.

List of international goals scored by Jacques Haeko
No.	Date	Venue	Opponent	Score	Result	Competition	Ref.
1	1 September 2011	Stade Rivière Salée, Nouméa, New Caledonia	Tuvalu	5–0	8–0	2011 Pacific Games	
2	3 September 2011	Stade Rivière Salée, Nouméa, New Caledonia	American Samoa	4–0	8–0	2011 Pacific Games	
3	3 June 2012	Lawson Tama Stadium, Honiara, Solomon Islands	Tahiti	2–3	3–4	2012 OFC Nations Cup	
4	5 June 2012	Lawson Tama Stadium, Honiara, Solomon Islands	Samoa	2–0	9–0	2012 OFC Nations Cup	
5	5 June 2012	Lawson Tama Stadium, Honiara, Solomon Islands	Samoa	6–0	9–0	2012 OFC Nations Cup	
6	5 June 2012	Lawson Tama Stadium, Honiara, Solomon Islands	Samoa	7–0	9–0	2012 OFC Nations Cup	
7	5 June 2012	Lawson Tama Stadium, Honiara, Solomon Islands	Samoa	8–0	9–0	2012 OFC Nations Cup	
8	5 June 2012	Lawson Tama Stadium, Honiara, Solomon Islands	Samoa	9–0	9–0	2012 OFC Nations Cup	
9	12 October 2012	Lawson Tama Stadium, Honiara, Solomon Islands	Solomon Islands	5–2	6–2	2014 FIFA World Cup qualification	

== Honours ==
New Caledonia

- OFC Nations Cup: Runner-up, 2012
- Pacific Games: Gold Medalist, 2011
