= Georges Gope-Fenepej =

New Caledonian footballer (born 1988)

Personal information
- Date of birth: 23 October 1988 (age 38)
- Place of birth: Lifou, New Caledonia
- Height: 1.82 m (6 ft 0 in)
- Position: Winger

Team information
- Current team: Saint-Colomban Locminé
- Number: 18

Senior career*
Years	Team	Apps	(Gls)
2006–2010	AS Kirkitr		
2011–2012	Magenta	23	(14)
2012–2016	Troyes	18	(1)
2012–2015	Troyes B	32	(18)
2014–2015	→ Boulogne (loan)	20	(7)
2015–2018	Amiens	34	(5)
2018	Amiens B	13	(10)
2018–2021	Le Mans	42	(8)
2019–2021	Le Mans B	5	(1)
2021–2023	Concarneau	42	(1)
2023–2025	Saint-Pryvé Saint-Hilaire	51	(9)
2025–	Saint-Colomban Locminé	19	(2)

International career^{‡}
2011–	New Caledonia	27	(18)
Medal record
Men's football
Representing New Caledonia
OFC Nations Cup
Runner-up	2012 Solomon Islands
Pacific Games
Gold medal – first place	2011 New Caledonia
- * Club domestic league appearances and goals as of 3 October 2026 ‡ National team caps and goals as of 26 March 2026

Georges Gope-Fenepej (born 23 October 1988) is a New Caledonian professional footballer who plays as a striker for Championnat National 1 club Saint-Colomban Locminé. He is the brother of fellow footballer John Gope-Fenepej.

== Club career ==
Gope-Fenepej started his senior career in New Caledonia with AS Kirkitr before moving to AS Magenta in 2011.

On 29 June 2012, he signed a one-year contract with French outfit Troyes AC, newly promoted to French Ligue 1. On 2 February 2013 he made his Ligue 1 debut as a stoppage time substitute in the 1–1 draw at Lille. He scored his first senior goal for the club in a 4–0 Ligue 2 victory at Gazélec Ajaccio on 29 August 2014, his only league appearance for the club that season.

In October 2014, Gope-Fenepej joined Boulogne on loan until the end of the 2014–15 season, in order to get more game time.

Returning to Troyes, Gope-Fenepej was limited to appearances for the B team during the early parts of the 2015–16 season, and in November 2015 he secured a move to Amiens SC in the Championnat National. He was a part of the Amiens team which won back-to-back promotions from Championnat National to Ligue 1 in 2015–16 and 2016–17.

In July 2018, Gope-Fenepej returned to the Championnat National with Le Mans. He again won promotion at the end of the season.

== International career ==
He participated in his first tournament for the New Caledonia national team at the 2011 Pacific Games where he scored seven goals as New Caledonia retained their title.

== Career statistics ==
=== Club ===
As of match played 15 March 2025

Appearances and goals by club, season and competition
Club	Season	League			National cup (Note: Includes Coupe de Calédonie and Coupe de France)		League cup (Note: Includes Coupe de la Ligue)		Continental		Total	
Club	Season	Division	Apps	Goals	Apps	Goals	Apps	Goals	Apps	Goals	Apps	Goals
Magenta	2011	New Caledonia Super Ligue	?		?		—		3 (Note: Appearance(s) in OFC Champions League)	2	3+	2+
Magenta	2012	New Caledonia Super Ligue	?		?		—		—		?	?
Magenta	Total		?		?		—		3	2	3+	2+
Troyes B	2012–13	CFA 2	15	4	—		—		—		15	4
Troyes B	2013–14	CFA 2	11	12	—		—		—		11	12
Troyes B	2014–15	CFA	1	0	—		—		—		1	0
Troyes B	2015–16	CFA	6	2	—		—		—		6	2
Troyes B	Total		33	18	—		—		—		33	18
Troyes	2012–13	Ligue 1	1	0	0	0	0	0	—		1	0
Troyes	2013–14	Ligue 2	16	0	1	1	2	0	—		19	1
Troyes	2014–15	Ligue 2	1	1	0	0	1	0	—		2	1
Troyes	2015–16	Ligue 1	0	0	0	0	0	0	—		0	0
Troyes	Total		18	1	1	1	3	0	—		22	2
Boulogne (loan)	2014–15	Championnat National	20	7	5	1	—		—		25	8
Amiens	2015–16	Championnat National	18	5	0	0	—		—		18	5
Amiens	2016–17	Ligue 2	13	0	0	0	0	0	—		13	0
Amiens	2017–18	Ligue 1	3	0	1	0	3	0	—		7	0
Amiens	Total		34	5	1	0	3	0	—		38	5
Amiens B	2016–17	CFA 2	4	2	—		—		—		4	2
Amiens B	2017–18	Championnat National 3	13	10	—		—		—		13	10
Amiens B	Total		17	12	—		—		—		17	12
Le Mans	2018–19	Championnat National	13	2	1	0	—		—		14	2
Le Mans	2019–20	Ligue 2	12	3	1	0	2	0	—		15	3
Le Mans	2020–21	Championnat National	17	3	0	0	—		—		17	3
Le Mans	Total		42	8	2	0	2	0	—		46	8
Le Mans B	2018–19	Championnat National 3	4	1	—		—		—		4	1
Le Mans B	2019–20	Championnat National 3	1	0	—		—		—		1	0
Le Mans B	Total		5	1	—		—		—		5	1
Concarneau	2021–22	Championnat National	24	1	0	0	—		—		24	1
Concarneau	2022–23	Championnat National	18	0	0	0	—		—		18	0
Concarneau	Total		42	1	0	0	—		—		42	1
Saint-Pryvé	2023–24	Championnat National 2	25	5	0	0	—		—		25	5
Saint-Pryvé	2024–25	Championnat National 2	21	3	0	0	—		—		21	3
Saint-Pryvé	Total		46	8	0	0	—		—		46	8
Career total			257+	61+	9+	2+	8	0	3	2	277+	65+

=== International ===
As of match played 26 March 2026

Appearances and goals by national team and year
National team	Year	Apps	Goals
New Caledonia	2011	8	7
New Caledonia	2012	8	8
New Caledonia	2013	2	0
New Caledonia	2016	2	0
New Caledonia	2022	1	0
New Caledonia	2024	3	1
New Caledonia	2025	2	2
New Caledonia	2026	1	0
Total		27	18

Scores and results list New Caledonia's goal tally first, score column indicates score after each Gope-Fenepej goal.

List of international goals scored by Georges Gope-Fenepej
No.	Date	Venue	Opponent	Score	Result	Competition	Ref.
1	27 August 2011	Stade Rivière Salée, Nouméa, New Caledonia	Vanuatu	1–0	5–0	2011 Pacific Games	
2	27 August 2011	Stade Rivière Salée, Nouméa, New Caledonia	Vanuatu	2–0	5–0	2011 Pacific Games	
3	27 August 2011	Stade Rivière Salée, Nouméa, New Caledonia	Vanuatu	5–0	5–0	2011 Pacific Games	
4	1 September 2011	Stade Rivière Salée, Nouméa, New Caledonia	Tuvalu	4–0	8–0	2011 Pacific Games	
5	7 September 2011	Stade Yoshida, Koné, New Caledonia	Tahiti	1–1	3–1	2011 Pacific Games	
6	7 September 2011	Stade Yoshida, Koné, New Caledonia	Tahiti	2–1	3–1	2011 Pacific Games	
7	9 September 2011	Stade Numa-Daly, Nouméa, New Caledonia	Solomon Islands	1–0	2–0	2011 Pacific Games	
8	1 June 2012	Lawson Tama Stadium, Honiara, Solomon Islands	Vanuatu	3–2	5–2	2012 OFC Nations Cup	
9	8 June 2012	Lawson Tama Stadium, Honiara, Solomon Islands	New Zealand	2–0	2–0	2012 OFC Nations Cup	
10	12 September 2012	Stade Pater Te Hono Nui, Papeete, Tahiti	Tahiti	3–0	4–0	2014 FIFA World Cup qualification	
11	12 September 2012	Stade Pater Te Hono Nui, Papeete, Tahiti	Tahiti	4–0	4–0	2014 FIFA World Cup qualification	
12	12 October 2012	Lawson Tama Stadium, Honiara, Solomon Islands	Solomon Islands	2–1	6–2	2014 FIFA World Cup qualification	
13	12 October 2012	Lawson Tama Stadium, Honiara, Solomon Islands	Solomon Islands	4–2	6–2	2014 FIFA World Cup qualification	
14	12 October 2012	Lawson Tama Stadium, Honiara, Solomon Islands	Solomon Islands	6–2	6–2	2014 FIFA World Cup qualification	
15	16 October 2012	Stade Numa-Daly, Nouméa, New Caledonia	Solomon Islands	1–0	5–0	2014 FIFA World Cup qualification	
16	10 October 2024	HFC Bank Stadium, Suva, Fiji	Papua New Guinea	2–0	3–1	2026 FIFA World Cup qualification	
17	21 March 2025	Wellington Regional Stadium, Wellington, New Zealand	Tahiti	1–0	3–0	2026 FIFA World Cup qualification	
18	21 March 2025	Wellington Regional Stadium, Wellington, New Zealand	Tahiti	2–0	3–0	2026 FIFA World Cup qualification	

== Honours ==
Amiens

- Ligue 2 runner-up: 2016–17

Concarneau

- Championnat National: 2022-23

New Caledonia

- OFC Nations Cup: Runner-up, 2012
- Pacific Games: Gold Medalist, 2011
