= 2012 OFC Nations Cup =

Tournament details
- Host country: Solomon Islands
- City: Honiara
- Dates: 1–10 June
- Teams: 8 (from 1 confederation)
- Venue: 1 (in 1 host city)

Final positions
- Champions: Tahiti (1st title)
- Runners-up: New Caledonia
- Third place: New Zealand
- Fourth place: Solomon Islands

Tournament statistics
- Matches played: 16
- Goals scored: 64 (4 per match)
- Attendance: 133,700 (8,356 per match)
- Top scorer(s): (New Caledonia) Jacques Haeko (6 goals)
- Best player: (French Polynesia) Nicolas Vallar
- Best goalkeeper: (New Caledonia) Rocky Nyikeine
- Fair play award: Solomon Islands

The 2012 OFC Nations Cup was the ninth edition of the OFC Nations Cup organised by the Oceania Football Confederation (OFC). The group stage of the tournament also doubled as the second round of the OFC qualification tournament for the 2014 FIFA World Cup. The four semi-finalists advanced to the final round of OFC qualifying, where they would compete for the OFC spot in the inter-confederation play-offs. The qualifying tournament was to be the football competition at the 2011 Pacific Games in Nouméa, New Caledonia. However, in June 2011 the format was amended, and the Pacific Games were no longer part of the qualification process. The new structure saw four of the lowest ranked entrants play a single round-robin tournament from 22 to 26 November 2011 in Samoa. The winner of this qualifying stage joined the other seven teams that received a bye to the Nations Cup proper.

The main tournament was originally scheduled for Fiji from 3–12 June 2012, but in March 2012, Fiji was stripped of the hosting rights as a result of a legal dispute involving OFC general secretary Tai Nicholas and Fijian authorities. The tournament was then awarded to the Solomon Islands.

Tahiti defeated New Caledonia in the final 1–0, winning their first title, and also became the first team other than Australia (no longer part of OFC) and New Zealand to be crowned Oceania champions.

== Host selection ==
On 30 July 2011 at the World Cup Preliminary Draw at Marina da Glória in Rio de Janeiro, Brazil, Fiji was confirmed as host of the 2012 OFC Nations Cup. However, a legal dispute between OFC General Secretary Tai Nicholas and Fijian authorities saw the tournament hosting rights revoked on 14 March 2012. This followed the stripping of both the men's and women's Olympic qualification tournaments from Fiji in January 2012. On 28 March 2012 it was confirmed that the OFC Nations Cup 2012 would take place in Solomon Islands with the venue of Lawson Tama Stadium in Honiara.

== Format ==
The eight second round teams competed in two round-robin groups of four. The eight teams were allocated to two pots of four teams based on the FIFA World Rankings of 27 July 2011, with the winner from Round One ranked 8th for this round. Teams ranked 1st – 4th were placed in Pot 1 with the remaining teams in Pot 2. Each group contained two teams from each of Pot 1 and Pot 2. Both group winners and runners-up advanced to the knockout stage and, separately, the third round of qualifying for the 2014 FIFA World Cup.

== Qualification ==
For this edition of the OFC Nations Cup, there was a qualification tournament for the four lowest ranked teams according to the July 2011 FIFA World Rankings. The qualification contained the following teams:

- American Samoa
- Cook Islands
- Samoa
- Tonga

Pos	Team	Pld	W	D	L	GF	GA	GD	Pts	Qualification	Samoa national football team	Tonga national football team	American Samoa national football team	Cook Islands national football team
1	Samoa	3	2	1	0	5	3	+2	7	Qualified for the 2012 OFC Nations Cup	—	1–1	1–0	—
2	Tonga	3	1	1	1	4	4	0	4		—	—	—	2–1
3	American Samoa	3	1	1	1	3	3	0	4		—	2–1	—	1–1
4	Cook Islands	3	0	1	2	4	6	−2	1		2–3	—	—	—

The qualification tournament was played from 22 to 26 November 2011 in Samoa. The winner, Samoa, qualified for the 2012 OFC Nations Cup.

== Participating nations ==
Team	FIFA Ranking (As at 9 May 2012)	Qualification	Appearance in the OFC Nations Cup	Previous best performance
Solomon Islands	183	Automatic	6th	Runner-up (2004)
New Zealand (TH)	130	Automatic	9th	Winner (1973, 1998, 2002 & 2008)
New Caledonia	155	Automatic	5th	Runner-up (2008)
Fiji	160	Automatic	7th	Third place (1998 & 2008)
Vanuatu	172	Automatic	8th	Fourth place (1973, 2000, 2002 & 2008)
Tahiti	179	Automatic	8th	Runner-up (1973, 1980 & 1996)
Papua New Guinea	193	Automatic	3rd	Group stage (1980 & 2002)
Samoa	156	First round winner	1st	None (debut)

== Officials ==
Nine referees and nine assistant referees were named for the tournament.

Referees

- (Fiji) Andrew Achari (withdrew)
- (New Caledonia) Isidore Assiene-Ambassa
- (Vanuatu) Bruce George
- (French Polynesia) Norbert Hauata
- (New Zealand) Chris Kerr
- (Solomon Islands) Gerald Oiaka
- (New Zealand) Peter O'Leary
- (Solomon Islands) John Saohu
- (French Polynesia) Kader Zitouni

Assistant Referees

- (French Polynesia) Paul Ahupu
- (Papua New Guinea) David Charles (replaced by (New Zealand) Simon Lount)
- (New Zealand) Jan-Hendrik Hintz
- (Vanuatu) Michael Joseph
- (Fiji) Ravinesh Kumar
- (Tonga) Tevita Makasini
- (Solomon Islands) Jackson Namo
- (Cook Islands) Terry Piri
- (New Zealand) Mark Rule

== Venues ==
All matches were held at the Lawson Tama Stadium in Honiara.

(Solomon Islands) Honiara
Lawson Tama Stadium
Capacity: 20,000
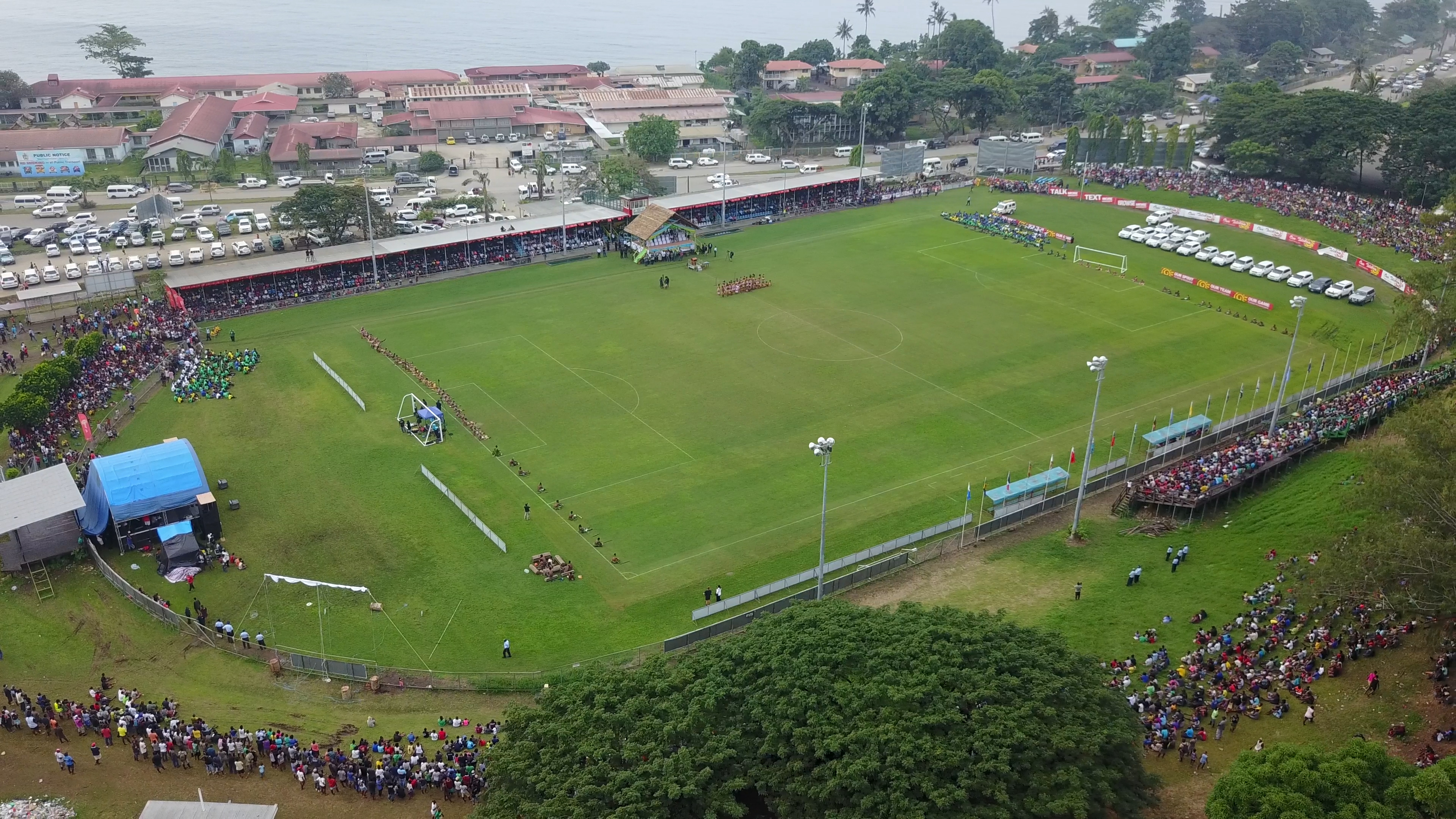

== Draw ==
The draw for the groups was held at the World Cup Preliminary Draw at the Marina da Glória in Rio de Janeiro, Brazil on 30 July 2011.

=== Seeding ===
Teams were seeded in two pots according to the July 2011 FIFA World Rankings, with Pot 1 containing the teams ranked 1–4 and Pot 2 the remaining automatic qualifiers as well as the eventual first round winner. Each group contains two teams from Pot 1 and two teams from Pot 2.

Pot 1	Pot 2
New Zealand; Fiji; New Caledonia; Vanuatu	Solomon Islands; Tahiti; Papua New Guinea; Samoa^{†}

^{†} First round winner whose identity was not known at the time of the draw.

== Group stage ==
If teams are even on points at the end of group play, the tied teams would be ranked by:

1. Goal difference in all group matches
2. Greater number of goals scored in all group matches
3. Greater number of points obtained in matches between the tied teams
4. Goal difference in matches between the tied teams
5. Greater number of goals scored in matches between the tied teams
6. Coin toss or drawing of lots

This was the same as the tiebreakers for 2014 FIFA World Cup qualification, except that drawing of lots was used instead of play-off match as the final tiebreaker.

=== Group A ===
Pos	Team	Pld	W	D	L	GF	GA	GD	Pts	Qualification	Tahiti national football team	New Caledonia national football team	Vanuatu national football team	Samoa national football team
1	Tahiti	3	3	0	0	18	5	+13	9	Semi-finals and World Cup qualifying third round	—	—	4–1	—
2	New Caledonia	3	2	0	1	17	6	+11	6	Semi-finals and World Cup qualifying third round	3–4	—	5–2	9–0
3	Vanuatu	3	1	0	2	8	9	−1	3		—	—	—	—
4	Samoa	3	0	0	3	1	24	−23	0		1–10	—	0–5	—

1 June 2012
12:00 UTC+11

Samoa	1–10	Tahiti
Malo 69'	Report	L. Tehau 8', 82', 84', 85'; J. Tehau 16', 78'; A. Tehau 18', 40'; T. Tehau 54'; Chong Hue 61'

Lawson Tama Stadium, Honiara
Attendance: 3,000
Referee: Gerald Oiaka (Solomon Islands)
1 June 2012
15:00 UTC+11

Vanuatu	2–5	New Caledonia
Tasso 52'; Naprapol 61'	Report	Kaï 32', 58', 76'; Gope-Fenepej 66'; R. Kayara 87'

Lawson Tama Stadium, Honiara
Attendance: 7,000
Referee: Peter O'Leary (New Zealand)

3 June 2012
12:00 UTC+11

Vanuatu	5–0	Samoa
Naprapol 29'; B. Kaltack 45+1'; Malas 47'; Tasso 74'; Vava 90+3'	Report

Lawson Tama Stadium, Honiara
Attendance: 2,200
Referee: John Saohu (Solomon Islands)
3 June 2012
15:00 UTC+11

Tahiti	4–3	New Caledonia
A. Tehau 19'; Vallar 28' (pen.); L. Tehau 34'; Degage 86'	Report	Bako 76'; Haeko 83'; Kauma 89'

Lawson Tama Stadium, Honiara
Attendance: 3,500
Referee: Chris Kerr (New Zealand)

5 June 2012
12:00 UTC+11

New Caledonia	9–0	Samoa
R. Kayara 10'; Haeko 11', 45+1', 71', 89', 90+1'; Kabeu 22'; Ixoée 25' (pen.); Gnipate 44'	Report

Lawson Tama Stadium, Honiara
Attendance: 1,000
Referee: Gerald Oiaka (Solomon Islands)
5 June 2012
15:00 UTC+11

Tahiti	4–1	Vanuatu
Vallar 14' (pen.); J. Tehau 37'; A. Tehau 57'; T. Tehau 86'	Report	Tasso 90+5'

Lawson Tama Stadium, Honiara
Attendance: 1,000
Referee: Peter O'Leary (New Zealand)

=== Group B ===
Pos	Team	Pld	W	D	L	GF	GA	GD	Pts	Qualification	New Zealand men's national football team	Solomon Islands national football team	Fiji national football team	Papua New Guinea national soccer team
1	New Zealand	3	2	1	0	4	2	+2	7	Semi-finals and World Cup qualifying third round	—	1–1	—	2–1
2	Solomon Islands	3	1	2	0	2	1	+1	5	Semi-finals and World Cup qualifying third round	—	—	—	—
3	Fiji	3	0	2	1	1	2	−1	2		0–1	0–0	—	1–1
4	Papua New Guinea	3	0	1	2	2	4	−2	1		—	0–1	—	—

2 June 2012
12:00 UTC+11

Fiji	0–1	New Zealand
	Report	Smith 11'

Lawson Tama Stadium, Honiara
Attendance: 15,000
Referee: Isidore Assiene-Ambassa (New Caledonia)
2 June 2012
15:00 UTC+11

Solomon Islands	1–0	Papua New Guinea
Totori 5'	Report

Lawson Tama Stadium, Honiara
Attendance: 15,000
Referee: Norbert Hauata (Tahiti)

4 June 2012
12:00 UTC+11

Papua New Guinea	1–2	New Zealand
Hans 89' (pen.)	Report	Smeltz 2'; Wood 52'

Lawson Tama Stadium, Honiara
Attendance: 3,000
Referee: Bruce George (Vanuatu)
4 June 2012
15:00 UTC+11

Fiji	0–0	Solomon Islands
	Report

Lawson Tama Stadium, Honiara
Attendance: 12,000
Referee: Kader Zitouni (Tahiti)

6 June 2012
12:00 UTC+11

Papua New Guinea	1–1	Fiji
Jack 85'	Report	Dunadamu 13'

Lawson Tama Stadium, Honiara
Attendance: 3,000
Referee: Kader Zitouni (Tahiti)
6 June 2012
15:00 UTC+11

New Zealand	1–1	Solomon Islands
Wood 13'	Report	Totori 56'

Lawson Tama Stadium, Honiara
Attendance: 18,000
Referee: Norbert Hauata (Tahiti)

== Knockout stage ==
The group winners and runners-up competed in a single elimination knockout stage to determine the Oceania Nations Cup champion. These matches had no impact on World Cup qualifying, although the winner of this knockout stage earned a place in the 2013 FIFA Confederations Cup. These four teams all competed in the third round of Oceania World Cup qualification to determine who moved on to the inter-confederation play-offs and a chance to qualify for the World Cup finals tournament in Brazil. Unlike 2010 qualifying, the team that qualified for those playoffs could be different from the one that played in the 2013 FIFA Confederations Cup.

Semi-finals
Honiara
Tahiti	1
Solomon Islands	0
Honiara
New Zealand	0
New Caledonia	2

Final
Honiara
Tahiti	1
New Caledonia	0
Third place
Honiara
Solomon Islands	3
New Zealand	4

=== Semi-finals ===
8 June 2012
11:00 UTC+11

Tahiti	1–0	Solomon Islands
J. Tehau 15'	Report

Lawson Tama Stadium, Honiara
Attendance: 15,000
Referee: Peter O'Leary (New Zealand)

8 June 2012
15:00 UTC+11

New Zealand	0–2	New Caledonia
	Report	Kaï 60'; Gope-Fenepej 90+3'

Lawson Tama Stadium, Honiara
Attendance: 10,000
Referee: Norbert Hauata (Tahiti)

=== Third place match ===
10 June 2012
11:00 UTC+11

Solomon Islands	3–4	New Zealand
Teleda 48'; Totori 54', 87'	Report	Wood 10', 24', 29'; Smeltz 90'

Lawson Tama Stadium, Honiara
Attendance: 15,000
Referee: Kader Zitouni (Tahiti)

=== Final ===
10 June 2012
15:00 UTC+11

Tahiti	1–0	New Caledonia
Chong Hue 10'	Report

Lawson Tama Stadium, Honiara
Attendance: 10,000
Referee: Peter O'Leary (New Zealand)

2012 OFC Nations Cup winners

Tahiti
First title

== Goalscorers ==
There were 64 goals scored in 16 matches, for an average of 4 goals per match.

6 goals

- (New Caledonia) Jacques Haeko

5 goals

- (New Zealand) Chris Wood
- (French Polynesia) Lorenzo Tehau

4 goals

- (New Caledonia) Bertrand Kaï
- (Solomon Islands) Benjamin Totori
- (French Polynesia) Alvin Tehau
- (French Polynesia) Jonathan Tehau

3 goals

- (Vanuatu) Robert Tasso

2 goals

- (New Caledonia) Georges Gope-Fenepej
- (New Caledonia) Roy Kayara
- (New Zealand) Shane Smeltz
- (French Polynesia) Steevy Chong Hue
- (French Polynesia) Teaonui Tehau
- (French Polynesia) Nicolas Vallar
- (Vanuatu) Jean Nako Naprapol

1 goal

- (Fiji) Maciu Dunadamu
- (New Caledonia) Marius Bako
- (New Caledonia) Kalaje Gnipate
- (New Caledonia) Judikael Ixoée
- (New Caledonia) Iamel Kabeu
- (New Caledonia) Dick Kauma
- (New Zealand) Tommy Smith
- (Papua New Guinea) Niel Hans
- (Papua New Guinea) Kema Jack
- (Samoa) Silao Malo
- (Solomon Islands) Himson Teleda
- (French Polynesia) Roihau Degage
- (Vanuatu) Brian Kaltack
- (Vanuatu) Derek Malas
- (Vanuatu) Freddy Vava

== Awards ==
The following awards were given:

- Golden Ball (best player): (French Polynesia) Nicolas Vallar
- Golden Boot (top scorer): (New Caledonia) Jacques Haeko
- Golden Glove (best goalkeeper): (New Caledonia) Rocky Nyikeine
- Fair Play Award: Solomon Islands
