= Fiji national football team results (1951–1999) =

The Fiji national football team represents Fiji in association football and is controlled by the Fiji Football Association (Fiji FA), the governing body of the sport in the country. Before joining Fédération Internationale de Football Association (FIFA) and the Oceania Football Confederation (OFC), it played its first match in October 1951 – a 6–4 friendly loss to New Zealand.

Between 1951 and 1999, Fiji played a total of 157 matches, won 66, drawn 28 and lost 63, scoring 335 goals and conceding 295.

In 1963, the Fiji FA joined FIFA and was a founding member of the OFC three years later which allowed the national team to begin competing in the qualifying stages of the FIFA World Cup and the OFC Men's Nations Cup. Fiji contested the inaugural Oceania Cup in 1973 – the forerunner to the OFC Men's Nations Cup – but lost all four of their matches and finished fifth of the five teams. The team did not contest qualification for the FIFA World Cup until the qualification tournament for the 1990 FIFA World Cup in 1988. They pulled off an upset in their first match, defeating Australia 1–0 but were eliminated in the first round.

Fiji obtained success at the 1991 South Pacific Games where they defeated the Solomon Islands in a penalty shoot-out to win the gold medal and at the 1998 OFC Nations Cup where they defeated Tahiti 4–2 to finish third. After winning the inaugural Melanesia Cup in 1988 – a forerunner to the MSG Prime Minister's Cup – they retained the title in 1989 and also won the competition in 1992 and 1998.

== Key ==
Key to matches

- Att. = Match attendance
- (H) = Home ground
- (A) = Away ground
- (N) = Neutral ground

Key to record by opponent

- Pld = Games played
- W = Games won
- D = Games drawn
- L = Games lost
- GF = Goals for
- GA = Goals against

== Results ==
Fiji's score is shown first in each case.

No.	Date	Venue	Opponents	Score	Competition	Fiji scorers	Att.	Ref.
1	7 October 1951	Suva (H)	New Zealand	4–6	Friendly	Unknown	—	
2	7 September 1952	Suva (H)	New Zealand	0–2	Friendly		—	
3	14 September 1952	Lautoka (H)	New Zealand	0–9	Friendly		—	
4	16 September 1952	Suva (H)	New Zealand	2–5	Friendly	Unknown	—	
5	29 August 1963	Buckhurst Park, Suva (N)	Papua and New Guinea	3–1	1963 South Pacific Games	Ali (2), Dutta	—	
6	1 September 1963	Churchill Park, Lautoka (N)	Solomon Islands	5–0	1963 South Pacific Games	Dutta (2), Ali (3)	—	
7	7 September 1963	Buckhurst Park, Suva (N)	New Caledonia	2–8	1963 South Pacific Games	Yee Gock Sue, D. Simmons	—	
8	17 September 1968	Auckland (A)	New Zealand	0–5	Friendly		—	
9	19 September 1968	New Caledonia (A)	New Caledonia	1–2	Friendly	Unknown	—	
10	14 August 1969	Club Germania, Port Moresby (N)	Solomon Islands	5–1	1969 South Pacific Games	Unknown	—	
11	15 August 1969	Club Germania, Port Moresby (N)	New Hebrides	5–2	1969 South Pacific Games	Unknown	—	
12	16 August 1969	Club Germania, Port Moresby (N)	Tahiti	0–2	1969 South Pacific Games		—	
13	18 August 1969	Club Germania, Port Moresby (N)	New Caledonia	0–11	1969 South Pacific Games		—	
14	20 August 1969	Club Germania, Port Moresby (N)	Papua New Guinea	1–1	1969 South Pacific Games	Unknown	—	
15	22 August 1969	Club Germania, Port Moresby (N)	Papua New Guinea	1–2	1969 South Pacific Games	Unknown	—	
16	30 August 1971	French Polynesia (A)	Tahiti	2–5	Friendly	Unknown	—	
17	9 September 1971	Papeete (N)	New Caledonia	1–5	1971 South Pacific Games	Unknown	—	
18	11 September 1971	Papeete (N)	New Hebrides	4–6	1971 South Pacific Games	Unknown	—	
19	15 September 1971	Papeete (N)	Cook Islands	15–1	1971 South Pacific Games	Unknown	—	
20	17 February 1973	Newmarket Park, Auckland (N)	New Zealand	1–5	1973 OFC Nations Cup	Vakatawa	—	
21	20 February 1973	Newmarket Park, Auckland (N)	New Caledonia	0–2	1973 OFC Nations Cup		—	
22	21 February 1973	Newmarket Park, Auckland (N)	New Hebrides	1–2	1973 OFC Nations Cup	Kurivitu	—	
23	23 February 1973	Newmarket Park, Auckland (N)	Tahiti	0–4	1973 OFC Nations Cup		—	
24	27 July 1975	Fiji (H)	China	1–4	Friendly	Unknown	—	
25	4 August 1975	Guam (N)	Guam	11–0	1975 South Pacific Games	V. Singh, Nawalu (3), Janeman (3), S. Singh, Sami, Nakosia (2)	—	
26	5 August 1975	Guam (N)	Solomon Islands	1–1	1975 South Pacific Games	S. Singh	—	
27	7 August 1975	Guam (N)	Tahiti	0–3	1975 South Pacific Games		—	
28	8 August 1975	Guam (N)	Solomon Islands	2–3	1975 South Pacific Games	Nakosia, Nawalu	—	
29	19 March 1977	Fiji (H)	Australia	1–0	Friendly	Unknown	—	
30	1979	Fiji (H)	New Caledonia	0–5	Friendly		—	
31	1979	Fiji (H)	New Caledonia	5–2	Friendly	Unknown	—	
32	29 June 1979	Buckhurst Park, Suva (H)	New Zealand	0–6	Friendly		—	
33	1 July 1979	Churchill Park, Lautoka (H)	New Zealand	0–3	Friendly		—	
34	29 August 1979	Buckhurst Park, Suva (N)	Papua New Guinea	0–0	1979 South Pacific Games		—	
35	30 August 1979	Ratu Cakobau Park, Nausori (N)	Kiribati	24–0	1979 South Pacific Games	Chand (8), Janeman (7), Salim (3), Tubuna (2), Waqa (2), Vuilabasa, Khan	—	
36	3 September 1979	Ratu Cakobau Park, Nausori (N)	Wallis and Futuna	5–0	1979 South Pacific Games	Janeman (2), Tubuna, Salim, Khan	—	
37	4 September 1979	Buckhurst Park, Suva (N)	Solomon Islands	2–0	1979 South Pacific Games	Chand (2)	—	
38	7 September 1979	Buckhurst Park, Suva (N)	Tahiti	0–3	1979 South Pacific Games		22,000	
39	19 February 1980	Buckhurst Park, Suva (H)	New Zealand	1–1	Friendly	Unknown	—	
40	21 February 1980	Churchill Park, Lautoka (H)	New Zealand	0–2	Friendly		—	
41	25 February 1980	Stade de Magenta, Nouméa (N)	Solomon Islands	3–1	1980 OFC Nations Cup	Unknown	—	
42	27 February 1980	Stade de Magenta, Nouméa (N)	New Zealand	4–0	1980 OFC Nations Cup	Unknown	—	
43	29 February 1980	Stade de Magenta, Nouméa (N)	Tahiti	3–6	1980 OFC Nations Cup	Unknown	—	
44	1 March 1980	Stade de Magenta, Nouméa (N)	New Caledonia	1–2	1980 OFC Nations Cup	Unknown	—	
45	2 July 1980	Fiji (H)	Tahiti	1–1	Friendly	Unknown	—	
46	July 1980	Fiji (H)	Tahiti	1–1	Friendly	Unknown	—	
47	July 1980	Fiji (H)	Tahiti	1–1	Friendly	Unknown	—	
48	30 August 1980	Fiji (H)	Mexico	0–2	Friendly	Unknown	—	
49	March 1981	French Polynesia (A)	Tahiti	0–1	Friendly	Unknown	—	
50	March 1981	French Polynesia (A)	Tahiti	1–2	Friendly	Unknown	—	
51	3 May 1981	Govind Park, Ba (H)	New Zealand	0–4	1982 FIFA World Cup qualification		—	
52	31 May 1981	Suva (H)	Indonesia	0–0	1982 FIFA World Cup qualification		—	
53	6 June 1981	Suva (H)	Chinese Taipei	2–1	1982 FIFA World Cup qualification	Jone (2)	—	
54	7 July 1981	Lawson Tama Stadium, Honiara (N)	Solomon Islands	2–1	1981 South Pacific Mini Games	Maseu, Prasad	—	
55	8 July 1981	Lawson Tama Stadium, Honiara (N)	Papua New Guinea	2–3	1981 South Pacific Mini Games	Ravula, Simmons	—	
56	10 July 1981	Lawson Tama Stadium, Honiara (N)	Vanuatu	1–1	1981 South Pacific Mini Games	Tubi	—	
57	11 July 1981	Lawson Tama Stadium, Honiara (N)	Western Samoa	4–0	1981 South Pacific Mini Games	Simmons, Dickson, Rasasa, Chung	—	
58	13 July 1981	Lawson Tama Stadium, Honiara (N)	New Caledonia	0–3	1981 South Pacific Mini Games		—	
59	14 July 1981	Lawson Tama Stadium, Honiara (N)	Tahiti	0–6	1981 South Pacific Mini Games		—	
60	26 July 1981	Suva (H)	Australia	1–4	1982 FIFA World Cup qualification	Vuilabasa	—	
61	4 August 1981	Taipei (A)	Chinese Taipei	0–0	1982 FIFA World Cup qualification		—	
62	10 August 1981	Jakarta (A)	Indonesia	3–3	1982 FIFA World Cup qualification	Jone, Vuilabasa, Willams	—	
63	14 August 1981	Melbourne (A)	Australia	0–10	1982 FIFA World Cup qualification		—	
64	16 August 1981	Mount Smart Stadium, Auckland (A)	New Zealand	0–13	1982 FIFA World Cup qualification		—	
65	16 August 1983	Buckhurst Park, Suva (H)	New Zealand	2–0	Friendly	Unknown	—	
66	18 August 1983	Prince Charles Park, Nadi (H)	New Zealand	0–1	Friendly		—	
67	24 August 1983	Apia (N)	Solomon Islands	10–0	1983 South Pacific Games	Unknown	—	
68	26 August 1983	Apia (N)	Vanuatu	6–0	1983 South Pacific Games	Unknown	—	
69	28 August 1983	Apia (N)	New Caledonia	5–1	1983 South Pacific Games	Unknown	—	
70	September 1983	Apia (N)	Papua New Guinea	2–0	1983 South Pacific Games	Unknown	—	
71	September 1983	Apia (N)	New Caledonia	3–2	1983 South Pacific Games	Unknown	—	
72	15 September 1983	Apia (N)	Tahiti	0–1	1983 South Pacific Games		—	
73	18 October 1984	Churchill Park, Lautoka (H)	New Zealand	1–2	Friendly	Unknown	—	
74	20 October 1984	National Stadium, Suva (H)	New Zealand	1–1	Friendly	Unknown	—	
75	3 June 1985	Links Avenue, Mount Maunganui (A)	New Zealand	0–5	Friendly		—	
76	5 June 1985	Childers Road Reserve, Gisborne (A)	New Zealand	0–3	Friendly		—	
77	7 June 1985	Bill McKinlay Park, Auckland (A)	New Zealand	0–2	Friendly		—	
78	4 July 1985	Fiji (H)	Tahiti	0–1	Friendly		—	
79	11 July 1985	Fiji (H)	Tahiti	0–1	Friendly		—	
80	14 July 1985	Fiji (H)	Tahiti	1–2	Friendly	Unknown	—	
81	17 September 1986	Churchill Park, Lautoka (H)	New Zealand	2–4	Friendly	Unknown	—	
82	19 September 1986	National Stadium, Suva (H)	New Zealand	1–2	Friendly	Unknown	—	
83	March 1987	Fiji (H)	Solomon Islands	2–1	Friendly	Unknown	—	
84	March 1987	Fiji (H)	Solomon Islands	2–2	Friendly	Unknown	—	
85	11 March 1987	Fiji (H)	Solomon Islands	4–1	Friendly	Unknown	—	
86	23 April 1987	Fiji (H)	New Caledonia	2–1	Friendly	Unknown	—	
87	25 April 1987	Fiji (H)	New Caledonia	1–0	Friendly	Unknown	—	
88	21 October 1988	Solomon Islands (N)	Solomon Islands	1–1	1988 Melanesia Cup	Unknown	—	
89	24 October 1988	Solomon Islands (N)	Vanuatu	8–0	1988 Melanesia Cup	Unknown	—	
90	25 October 1988	Solomon Islands (N)	New Caledonia	2–0	1988 Melanesia Cup	Unknown	—	
91	26 October 1988	Solomon Islands (N)	Solomon Islands	3–1	1988 Melanesia Cup	Unknown	—	
92	14 November 1988	National Stadium, Suva (H)	New Zealand	1–1	Friendly	Unknown	—	
93	17 November 1988	Churchill Park, Lautoka (H)	New Zealand	2–0	Friendly	Unknown	—	
94	19 November 1988	Govind Park, Ba (H)	New Zealand	1–0	Friendly	Unknown	—	
95	26 November 1988	Prince Charles Park, Nadi (H)	Australia	1–0	1990 FIFA World Cup qualification	Madigi	—	
96	3 December 1988	Newcastle (A)	Australia	1–5	1990 FIFA World Cup qualification	Dalai	—	
97	28 October 1989	Fiji (N)	Papua New Guinea	2–1	1989 Melanesia Cup	Unknown	—	
98	30 October 1989	Fiji (N)	Vanuatu	2–1	1989 Melanesia Cup	Unknown	—	
99	31 October 1989	Fiji (N)	New Caledonia	3–0	1989 Melanesia Cup	Unknown	—	
100	4 November 1989	Fiji (N)	Solomon Islands	0–0	1989 Melanesia Cup		—	
101	1 November 1990	Nouméa (N)	Solomon Islands	0–0	1990 Melanesia Cup		—	
102	5 November 1990	Nouméa (N)	New Caledonia	0–0	1990 Melanesia Cup		—	
103	6 November 1990	La Foa (N)	Vanuatu	1–1	1990 Melanesia Cup	Unknown	—	
104	8 November 1990	Nouméa (N)	Papua New Guinea	1–0	1990 Melanesia Cup	Unknown	—	
105	10 September 1991	Sir Ignatius Kilage Stadium, Lae (N)	New Caledonia	3–1	1991 South Pacific Games	Nawalu (2), Watkins	—	
106	12 September 1991	Sir Ignatius Kilage Stadium, Lae (N)	Guam	14–1	1991 South Pacific Games	Madigi (3), Lomu (3), Nawalu (3), Rova (2), Unknown (3)	—	
107	14 September 1991	Sir Ignatius Kilage Stadium, Lae (N)	Tahiti	3–0	1991 South Pacific Games	Madigi, Bula, Matanitobua	—	
108	17 September 1991	Sir Ignatius Kilage Stadium, Lae (N)	Vanuatu	3–1 (a.e.t.)	1991 South Pacific Games	Bula (2), Nawalu	—	
109	20 September 1991	Sir Ignatius Kilage Stadium, Lae (N)	Solomon Islands	1–1	1991 South Pacific Games	Nawalu	—	
110	7 June 1992	Christchurch (A)	New Zealand	0–3	1994 FIFA World Cup qualification		—	
111	25 July 1992	Korman Stadium, Port Vila (N)	Solomon Islands	2–1	1992 Melanesia Cup	Nawalu, Masilagi	—	
112	28 July 1992	Korman Stadium, Port Vila (N)	New Caledonia	2–2	1992 Melanesia Cup	Watkins, Madigi	—	
113	30 July 1992	Korman Stadium, Port Vila (N)	Vanuatu	2–0	1992 Melanesia Cup	Nawalu, Bula	—	
114	12 September 1992	Suva (H)	Vanuatu	3–0	1994 FIFA World Cup qualification	Moceimereke (3)	—	
115	19 September 1992	Suva (H)	New Zealand	0–0	1994 FIFA World Cup qualification		—	
116	26 September 1992	Port Vila (A)	Vanuatu	3–0	1994 FIFA World Cup qualification	Bulinaceva, Nawalu	—	
117	22 May 1993	McLean Park, Napier (A)	New Zealand	0–2	Friendly		—	
118	24 May 1993	Palmerston North (A)	New Zealand	0–5	Friendly		—	
119	30 November 1993	French Polynesia (A)	Tahiti	0–3	Friendly		—	
120	7 December 1993	Port Vila (N)	Solomon Islands	1–0	1993 South Pacific Mini Games	Unknown	—	
121	9 December 1993	Port Vila (N)	Tahiti	0–1	1993 South Pacific Mini Games		—	
122	13 December 1993	Port Vila (N)	Guam	12–0	1993 South Pacific Mini Games	Unknown	—	
123	14 December 1993	Port Vila (N)	Vanuatu	2–0	1993 South Pacific Mini Games	Unknown	—	
124	16 December 1993	Port Vila (N)	Tahiti	0–3	1993 South Pacific Mini Games		—	
125	21 May 1994	Fiji (H)	Tahiti	1–1	Friendly	Unknown	—	
126	23 May 1994	Fiji (H)	Tahiti	2–2	Friendly	Unknown	—	
127	25 May 1994	Fiji (H)	Tahiti	2–0	Friendly	Unknown	—	
128	4 July 1994	Solomon Islands (N)	New Caledonia	3–1	1994 Melanesia Cup	Unknown	—	
129	6 July 1994	Solomon Islands (N)	Papua New Guinea	1–0	1994 Melanesia Cup	Unknown	—	
130	7 July 1994	Solomon Islands (N)	Solomon Islands	0–1	1994 Melanesia Cup		—	
131	8 July 1994	Solomon Islands (N)	Vanuatu	4–2	1994 Melanesia Cup	Unknown	—	
132	2 September 1994	Solomon Islands (A)	Solomon Islands	0–1	Friendly		—	
133	24 March 1995	French Polynesia (A)	Tahiti	3–3	Friendly	Unknown	—	
134	30 March 1995	French Polynesia (A)	Tahiti	0–3	Friendly		—	
135	18 August 1995	French Polynesia (N)	Papua New Guinea	2–2	1995 South Pacific Games	Unknown	—	
136	20 August 1995	French Polynesia (N)	Guam	8–0	1995 South Pacific Games	Unknown	—	
137	22 August 1995	French Polynesia (N)	Vanuatu	3–1	1995 South Pacific Games	Unknown	—	
138	24 August 1995	French Polynesia (N)	Solomon Islands	3–3	1995 South Pacific Games	Unknown	—	
139	26 August 1995	French Polynesia (N)	Vanuatu	3–0	1995 South Pacific Games	Unknown	—	
140	1996	Fiji (H)	New Caledonia	1–0	Friendly	Unknown	—	
141	1996	Fiji (H)	New Caledonia	4–0	Friendly	Unknown	—	
142	1996	Fiji (H)	New Caledonia	5–1	Friendly	Unknown	—	
143	17 February 1997	Fiji (H)	Solomon Islands	1–2	Friendly	Unknown	—	
144	21 February 1997	Fiji (H)	Solomon Islands	3–2	Friendly	Unknown	—	
145	1 May 1997	Fiji (H)	New Caledonia	5–1	Friendly	Unknown	—	
146	7 June 1997	Govind Park, Ba (H)	New Zealand	0–1	1998 FIFA World Cup qualification		—	
147	15 June 1997	Suva (H)	Papua New Guinea	3–1	1998 FIFA World Cup qualification	Pita, Masi, Duguga	—	
148	18 June 1997	North Harbour Stadium, Auckland (A)	New Zealand	0–5	1998 FIFA World Cup qualification		—	
149	21 June 1997	Port Moresby (A)	Papua New Guinea	1–0	1998 FIFA World Cup qualification	Driu	—	
150	5 September 1998	Espiritu Santo (N)	New Caledonia	3–0	1998 Melanesia Cup	Unknown	—	
151	7 September 1998	Espiritu Santo (N)	Vanuatu	2–1	1998 Melanesia Cup	Unknown	—	
152	10 September 1998	Espiritu Santo (N)	Papua New Guinea	2–0	1998 Melanesia Cup	Unknown	—	
153	12 September 1998	Espiritu Santo (N)	Solomon Islands	1–1	1998 Melanesia Cup	Unknown	—	
154	25 September 1998	Lang Park, Brisbane (N)	Australia	1–3	1998 OFC Nations Cup	Masi	—	
155	30 September 1998	Lang Park, Brisbane (N)	Cook Islands	3–0	1998 OFC Nations Cup	Dickinson (o.g.), Kilalwaca, Nasema	—	
156	2 October 1998	Lang Park, Brisbane (N)	New Zealand	0–1	1998 OFC Nations Cup		—	
157	4 October 1998	Lang Park, Brisbane (N)	Tahiti	4–2	1998 OFC Nations Cup	Masi (2), Lal, Seruvatu	—	

Notes

1. A: Fiji won on penalties.
2. B: The 1994 Melanesia Cup doubled as qualifiers for the 1996 OFC Nations Cup.
3. C: The Solomon Islands won on penalties.
4. D: The 1998 Melanesia Cup doubled as qualifiers for the 1998 OFC Nations Cup.

== Record by opponent ==
Team	Pld	W	D	L	GF	GA	GD	WPCT
Australia	6	2	0	4	5	22	−17	33.33
China	1	0	0	1	1	4	−3	0.00
Chinese Taipei	2	1	1	0	2	1	+1	50.00
Cook Islands	2	2	0	0	18	1	+17	100.00
Guam	4	4	0	0	45	1	+44	100.00
Indonesia	2	0	2	0	3	3	0	0.00
Kiribati	1	1	0	0	24	0	+24	100.00
Mexico	1	0	0	1	0	2	−2	0.00
New Caledonia	24	14	2	8	52	50	+2	58.33
New Zealand	32	4	4	24	23	99	−76	12.50
Papua New Guinea	13	8	3	2	21	11	+10	61.54
Samoa (Note: Includes results as Western Samoa.)	1	1	0	0	4	0	+4	100.00
Solomon Islands	24	12	8	4	54	25	+29	50.00
Tahiti	26	3	6	17	25	58	−33	11.54
Vanuatu (Note: Includes results as New Hebrides.)	17	13	2	2	53	18	+35	76.47
Wallis and Futuna	1	1	0	0	5	0	+5	100.00
Total	157	66	28	63	335	295	+40	42.04

Source: Results
