= Solomon Islands national football team results (1963–1999) =

This page details the match results and statistics of the Solomon Islands national football team from 1963 to 1999.

== Key ==
Key to matches

- Att. = Match attendance
- (H) = Home ground
- (A) = Away ground
- (N) = Neutral ground

Key to record by opponent

- Pld = Games played
- W = Games won
- D = Games drawn
- L = Games lost
- GF = Goals for
- GA = Goals against

== Results ==
Solomon Islands' score is shown first in each case.

No.	Date	Venue	Opponents	Score	Competition	Solomon Islands scorers	Att.	Ref.
1	30 August 1963	Buckhurst Park, Suva (N)	New Hebrides	6–3	1963 South Pacific Games	Mabulou, Famani, Suamoni (2), Beni (2)	—	
2	1 September 1963	Churchill Park, Lautoka (N)	Fiji	0–5	1963 South Pacific Games		—	
3	6 September 1963	Buckhurst Park, Suva (N)	Tahiti	0–18	1963 South Pacific Games		—	
4	9 December 1966	Nouméa (N)	New Caledonia	0–8	1966 South Pacific Games		—	
5	13 December 1966	Nouméa (N)	New Hebrides	4–4	1966 South Pacific Games	Unknown	—	
6	14 August 1969	Club Germania, Port Moresby (N)	Fiji	1–5	1969 South Pacific Games	Unknown	—	
7	15 August 1969	Club Germania, Port Moresby (N)	New Caledonia	1–1	1969 South Pacific Games	Unknown	—	
8	16 August 1969	Club Germania, Port Moresby (N)	Papua New Guinea	0–4	1969 South Pacific Games		—	
9	18 August 1969	Club Germania, Port Moresby (N)	Tahiti	0–7	1969 South Pacific Games		—	
10	20 August 1969	Club Germania, Port Moresby (N)	New Hebrides	7–2	1969 South Pacific Games	Unknown	—	
11	2 August 1975	Guam (N)	Guam	5–1	1975 South Pacific Games	Unknown	—	
12	5 August 1975	Guam (N)	Fiji	1–1	1975 South Pacific Games	Unknown	—	
13	7 August 1975	Guam (N)	New Caledonia	0–4	1975 South Pacific Games		—	
14	8 August 1975	Guam (N)	Fiji	3–2	1975 South Pacific Games	Kaukai, Ote, one unknown	—	
15	7 July 1978	Solomon Islands (H)	Papua New Guinea	0–2	Friendly		—	
16	5 July 1979	Solomon Islands (H)	New Hebrides	3–1	Friendly	Unknown	—	
17	6 July 1979	Solomon Islands (H)	New Hebrides	3–0	Friendly	Unknown	—	
18	29 August 1979	Buckhurst Park, Suva (N)	Wallis and Futuna	6–0	1979 South Pacific Games	Maelauna (3), Fa'arodo, Suri, Sulimae	—	
19	31 August 1979	Bidesi Park, Suva (N)	Western Samoa	12–0	1979 South Pacific Games	Unknown	—	
20	3 September 1979	Ratu Cakobau Park, Nausori (N)	Papua New Guinea	3–2	1979 South Pacific Games	Suri (2), Bebeu	—	
21	4 September 1979	Buckhurst Park, Suva (N)	Fiji	0–2	1979 South Pacific Games		—	
22	7 September 1979	Buckhurst Park, Suva (N)	New Caledonia	3–1	1979 South Pacific Games	Maelauna (2), Ngawaeramo	—	
23	25 February 1980	Stade Numa-Daly Magenta, Nouméa (N)	Fiji	1–3	1980 OFC Nations Cup	Unknown	—	
24	27 February 1980	Stade Numa-Daly Magenta, Nouméa (N)	Tahiti	1–12	1980 OFC Nations Cup	Unknown	—	
25	29 February 1980	Stade Numa-Daly Magenta, Nouméa (N)	New Zealand	1–6	1980 OFC Nations Cup	Karitea	—	
26	7 July 1981	Lawson Tama Stadium, Honiara (N)	Fiji	1–2	1981 South Pacific Mini Games	Sokeni	—	
27	9 July 1981	SIPL, Honiara (N)	New Caledonia	1–1	1981 South Pacific Mini Games	Sokeni	—	
28	10 July 1981	Lawson Tama Stadium, Honiara (N)	Western Samoa	5–0	1981 South Pacific Mini Games	Ini (2), Kasute'e (3)	—	
29	11 July 1981	Lawson Tama Stadium, Honiara (N)	Vanuatu	2–1	1981 South Pacific Mini Games	Sokeni, Tiale	—	
30	13 July 1981	Lawson Tama Stadium, Honiara (N)	Tahiti	1–4	1981 South Pacific Mini Games	Lae	—	
31	14 July 1981	Lawson Tama Stadium, Honiara (N)	Papua New Guinea	1–2	1981 South Pacific Mini Games	Lae	—	
32	24 August 1983	Apia (N)	Fiji	0–10	1983 South Pacific Games		—	
33	August 1983	Apia (N)	New Caledonia	0–1	1983 South Pacific Games		—	
—	August 1983	Apia (N)	Vanuatu	–	1983 South Pacific Games		—	
34	March 1987	Fiji (A)	Fiji	1–2	Friendly	Unknown	—	
35	March 1987	Fiji (A)	Fiji	2–2	Friendly	Unknown	—	
36	11 March 1987	Fiji (A)	Fiji	1–4	Friendly	Unknown	—	
37	21 October 1988	Solomon Islands (N)	Fiji	1–1	1988 Melanesia Cup	Unknown	—	
38	24 October 1988	Solomon Islands (N)	New Caledonia	1–0	1988 Melanesia Cup	Unknown	—	
39	25 October 1988	Solomon Islands (N)	Vanuatu	5–0	1988 Melanesia Cup	Unknown	—	
40	26 October 1988	Solomon Islands (N)	Fiji	1–3	1988 Melanesia Cup	Unknown	—	
41	28 October 1989	Fiji (N)	Vanuatu	2–0	1989 Melanesia Cup	Unknown	—	
42	30 October 1989	Fiji (N)	New Caledonia	0–2	1989 Melanesia Cup		—	
43	3 November 1989	Fiji (N)	Papua New Guinea	0–0	1989 Melanesia Cup		—	
44	4 November 1989	Fiji (N)	Fiji	0–0	1989 Melanesia Cup		—	
45	1 November 1990	Nouméa (N)	Fiji	0–0	1990 Melanesia Cup		—	
46	3 November 1990	Nouméa (N)	Vanuatu	1–1	1990 Melanesia Cup	Natei	—	
47	6 November 1990	Koné (N)	Papua New Guinea	1–0	1990 Melanesia Cup		—	
48	8 November 1990	Nouméa (N)	New Caledonia	1–3	1990 Melanesia Cup		—	
49	9 September 1991	Sir Ignatius Kilage Stadium, Lae (N)	Papua New Guinea	0–0	1991 South Pacific Games		—	
50	11 September 1991	Sir Ignatius Kilage Stadium, Lae (N)	Wallis and Futuna	5–0	1991 South Pacific Games	Unknown	—	
51	13 September 1991	Sir Ignatius Kilage Stadium, Lae (N)	Vanuatu	3–0	1991 South Pacific Games	Unknown	—	
52	17 September 1991	Sir Ignatius Kilage Stadium, Lae (N)	New Caledonia	4–1	1991 South Pacific Games	Ashley (2), Natei, Waeta	—	
53	20 September 1991	Sir Ignatius Kilage Stadium, Lae (N)	Fiji	1–1 (4–5p)	1991 South Pacific Games	Natei	—	
54	11 July 1992	Honiara (H)	Tahiti	1–1	1994 FIFA World Cup qualification	Hatei	—	
55	25 July 1992	Korman Stadium, Port Vila (N)	Fiji	1–2	1992 Melanesia Cup	Natei	—	
56	27 July 1992	Korman Stadium, Port Vila (N)	Vanuatu	3–1	1992 Melanesia Cup	Tome, Natei, Toatu	—	
57	30 July 1992	Korman Stadium, Port Vila (N)	New Caledonia	0–1	1992 Melanesia Cup		—	
58	4 September 1992	Honiara (H)	Australia	1–2	1994 FIFA World Cup qualification	Vato	—	
59	26 September 1992	Newcastle (A)	Australia	1–6	1994 FIFA World Cup qualification	Ashley	—	
60	9 October 1992	Papeete (A)	Tahiti	2–4	1994 FIFA World Cup qualification	Vato, Suri	—	
61	7 December 1993	Port Vila (N)	Fiji	0–1	1993 South Pacific Games		—	
62	11 December 1993	Port Vila (N)	Guam	12–1	1993 South Pacific Games	Unknown	—	
63	13 December 1993	Port Vila (N)	Tahiti	0–3	1993 South Pacific Games		—	
64	5 July 1994	Solomon Islands (N)	Papua New Guinea	2–0	1994 Melanesia Cup	Unknown	—	
65	6 July 1994	Solomon Islands (N)	Vanuatu	4–0	1994 Melanesia Cup	Unknown	—	
66	7 July 1994	Solomon Islands (N)	Fiji	1–0	1994 Melanesia Cup		—	
67	8 July 1994	Solomon Islands (N)	New Caledonia	3–1	1994 Melanesia Cup		—	
68	2 September 1994	Solomon Islands (H)	Fiji	1–0	Friendly	Unknown	—	
69	16 August 1995	Papeete (N)	Wallis and Futuna	12–1	1995 South Pacific Games	Unknown	—	
70	18 August 1995	Papeete (N)	New Caledonia	1–0	1995 South Pacific Games	Unknown	—	
71	19 August 1995	Papeete (N)	Tahiti	2–4	1995 South Pacific Games	Unknown	—	
72	21 August 1995	Papeete (N)	Cook Islands	16–0	1995 South Pacific Games	Unknown	—	
73	24 August 1995	Papeete (N)	Fiji	3–3	1995 South Pacific Games	Unknown	—	
74	26 August 1995	Papeete (N)	Tahiti	0–2	1995 South Pacific Games		—	
75	17 November 1995	Lawson Tama Stadium, Honiara (H)	Tahiti	0–1	1996 OFC Nations Cup		15,000	
76	11 May 1996	Stade Pater Te Hono Nui, Pirae (A)	Tahiti	1–2	1996 OFC Nations Cup	Seni	15,000	
77	16 September 1996	Sir Ignatius Kilage Stadium, Lae (N)	Papua New Guinea	1–1	1998 FIFA World Cup qualification	Rukumana	4,500	
78	18 September 1996	Sir Ignatius Kilage Stadium, Lae (N)	Vanuatu	1–1	1998 FIFA World Cup qualification	Berry	2,500	
79	15 February 1997	Nukuʻalofa (A)	Tonga	4–0	1998 FIFA World Cup qualification	Kiriau, Seni, Berry, Peli	3,000	
80	17 February 1997	Fiji (A)	Fiji	2–1	Friendly	Unknown	—	
81	21 February 1997	Fiji (A)	Fiji	2–3	Friendly	Unknown	—	
82	1 March 1997	Lawson Tama Stadium, Honiara (H)	Tonga	9–0	1998 FIFA World Cup qualification	Berry (3), Rukumana, Wabo, Seni (3), Kiriau	4,000	
83	11 June 1997	Sydney (N)	Australia	0–13	1998 FIFA World Cup qualification		3,127	
84	15 June 1997	Sydney (N)	Tahiti	4–1	1998 FIFA World Cup qualification	Seni, Berry (2), Toata	253	
85	17 June 1997	Sydney (N)	Australia	2–6	1998 FIFA World Cup qualification	Peli, Suri	2,122	
86	21 June 1997	Sydney (N)	Tahiti	1–1	1998 FIFA World Cup qualification	Rousseau	—	
87	5 September 1998	Espiritu Santo (N)	Papua New Guinea	3–1	1998 Melanesia Cup	Unknown	—	
88	8 September 1998	Espiritu Santo (N)	New Caledonia	3–2	1998 Melanesia Cup	Unknown	—	
89	10 September 1998	Espiritu Santo (N)	Vanuatu	1–3	1998 Melanesia Cup	Unknown	—	
90	12 September 1998	Espiritu Santo (N)	Fiji	1–1	1998 Melanesia Cup	Unknown	—	
91	19 September 1998	Solomon Islands (H)	Papua New Guinea	2–1	Friendly	Unknown	—	

Notes

1. A: Some sources suggest the Solomon Islands defeated Vanuatu in their final match at the 1983 South Pacific Games but the score is unknown. Both teams had been eliminated from the tournament prior to the match.
2. B: The 1994 Melanesia Cup doubled as qualifiers for the 1996 OFC Nations Cup.
3. C: The Solomon Islands won on penalties but the score is not known.
4. D: The 1998 Melanesia Cup doubled as qualifiers for the 1998 OFC Nations Cup.

== Record by opponent ==
Team	Pld	W	D	L	GF	GA	GD	WPCT
Australia	4	0	0	4	4	27	−23	0.00
Cook Islands	1	1	0	0	16	0	+16	100.00
Fiji	24	4	8	12	25	54	−29	16.67
Guam	2	2	0	0	17	2	+15	100.00
New Caledonia	14	6	2	6	18	26	−8	42.86
New Zealand	1	0	0	1	1	6	−5	0.00
Papua New Guinea	11	5	3	3	13	13	0	45.45
Samoa (Note: Includes results as Western Samoa.)	2	2	0	0	17	0	+17	100.00
Tahiti	13	1	2	10	13	60	−47	7.69
Tonga	2	2	0	0	13	0	+13	100.00
Vanuatu (Note: Includes results as New Hebrides.)	14	10	3	1	45	17	+28	71.43
Wallis and Futuna	3	3	0	0	23	1	+22	100.00
Total	91	36	18	37	205	206	−1	39.56

Source: Results
