= Buesnel =

Buesnel is a surname. Notable people with the surname include:

- Alex Buesnel (born 1992), British artistic gymnast
- Tony Buesnel, Australian former football coach
