= 1990 Melanesia Cup =

Tournament details
- Host country: New Caledonia
- Dates: 1–8 November
- Teams: 5 (from 1 confederation)

Final positions
- Champions: Vanuatu (1st title)
- Runners-up: New Caledonia
- Third place: Fiji

Tournament statistics
- Matches played: 10
- Goals scored: 15 (1.5 per match)

The 1990 Melanesia Cup was the third international association football championship for national teams from Melanesia. Hosted by New Caledonia, the competition ran from 1–8 November 1990 and was contested by the national teams of Fiji, New Caledonia, the Solomon Islands, Papua New Guinea and Vanuatu.

The round-robin tournament began with the first round of matches on 1 November 1990 and ended with the final round of matches on 8 November 1990.

Vanuatu won the competition for the first time after New Caledonia defeated the Solomon Islands 3–1 in the final round of matches.

== Background ==
The first edition of the Melanesia Cup took place in the Solomon Islands in 1988. Fiji were two-time defending champions having won both the inaugural edition and the second edition as hosts in 1989.

== Format ==
The tournament was played as a round-robin where each team would play all of the others once. The winner would be decided by the total number of points obtained across all matches played.

=== Participants ===
- Fiji
- New Caledonia
- Papua New Guinea
- Solomon Islands
- Vanuatu

== Summary ==
In the opening round of matches on 1 November, Fiji and the Solomon Islands drew 0–0 while Vanuatu defeated New Caledonia 1–0. Two days later, New Caledonia won 2–1 against Papua New Guinea and Vanuatu drew 1–1 with the Solomon Islands. On 5 November, New Caledonia and Fiji drew 0–0 and Vanuatu defeated Papua New Guinea 1–0. With more than half the matches played, Vanuatu were top of the table with five points from a possible six. As a result, a win in their last match would secure the title. New Caledonia were second on three points and Fiji and the Solomon Islands both had two points.

The following day, the Solomon Islands defeated Papua New Guinea 1–0 and Fiji drew 1–1 with Vanuatu. The results meant the title would go to the final day but leaders Vanuatu would have to rely on other results going their way after playing their fourth and final match. In the last round of matches on 8 November, Fiji defeated Papua New Guinea 1–0 and the Solomon Islands lost 3–1 to New Caledonia as Vanuatu won the competition for the first time.

== Table ==
Pos	Team	Pld	W	D	L	GF	GA	GD	Pts
1	Vanuatu	4	2	2	0	4	2	+2	6
2	New Caledonia	4	2	1	1	5	3	+2	5
3	Fiji	4	1	3	0	2	1	+1	5
4	Solomon Islands	4	1	2	1	3	4	−1	4
5	Papua New Guinea	4	0	0	4	1	5	−4	0

== Matches ==
1 November 1990

Fiji	0–0	Solomon Islands

Nouméa
1 November 1990

New Caledonia	0–1	Vanuatu

Nouméa

3 November 1990

Solomon Islands	1–1	Vanuatu

Nouméa
3 November 1990

Papua New Guinea	1–2	New Caledonia

Nouméa

5 November 1990

New Caledonia	0–0	Fiji

Nouméa
5 November 1990

Papua New Guinea	0–1	Vanuatu

Nouméa

6 November 1990

Vanuatu	1–1	Fiji

La Foa
6 November 1990

Solomon Islands	1–0	Papua New Guinea

Koné

8 November 1990

Papua New Guinea	0–1	Fiji

Nouméa
8 November 1990

New Caledonia	3–1	Solomon Islands

Nouméa
