= John Davani =

Papua New Guinean football manager

Personal information
- Date of birth: ?
- Place of birth: Papua New Guinea

Managerial career
- Years: Team
- 2002: Papua New Guinea
- 2010–2011: Papua New Guinea U17

John Davani is a Papua New Guinean professional football manager.

== Career ==
In 2002, he was a head coach of the Papua New Guinea national football team. Since 2010 until 2011 he coached the PNG Under-17 team.
