= Papua New Guinea national soccer team =

Papua New Guinea
- Nickname: Kapuls (Cuscus)
- Association: Papua New Guinea Football Association (PNGFA)
- Confederation: OFC (Oceania)
- Head coach: David Muta
- Captain: Alwin Komolong
- Most caps: Emmanuel Simon (41)
- Top scorer: Raymond Gunemba (18)
- Home stadium: Hubert Murray Stadium
- FIFA code: PNG
First colours	Second colours

FIFA ranking
- Current: 167 ▲1 (7 October 2026)
- Highest: 153 (June 2017)
- Lowest: 206 (October–November 2015)

First international
- Fiji 3–1 Papua and New Guinea (Suva, Fiji; 29 August 1963)

Biggest win
- Papua New Guinea 20–0 American Samoa (Nouméa, New Caledonia; 15 December 1987)

Biggest defeat
- Malaysia 10–0 Papua New Guinea (Kuala Terengganu, Malaysia; 20 June 2023)

OFC Nations Cup
- Appearances: 5 (first in 1980)
- Best result: Runners-up (2016)

Melanesia Cup / MSG Prime Minister's Cup
- Appearances: 9 (first in 1989)
- Best result: Melanesia Cup: Third place (1994); MSG Prime Minister's Cup: Champions (2022, 2024)
Medal record
Men's football
OFC Nations Cup
Runner-up	2016 Papua New Guinea
Pacific Games
Bronze medal – third place	1969 Papua New Guinea
Bronze medal – third place	1987 New Caledonia
Pacific Mini Games
Bronze medal – third place	1981 Solomon Islands
Melanesian Cup/MSG Prime Minister's Cup
Winner	2022 Vanuatu
Winner	2024 Solomon Islands
Runner-up	2025 Papua New Guinea
Third place	1994 Solomon Islands

The Papua New Guinea national soccer team is the men's national soccer team of Papua New Guinea and is controlled by the Papua New Guinea Football Association. Its nickname is the Kapuls, which is Tok Pisin for Cuscus.

Papua New Guinea's highest ever FIFA ranking was 153, in June 2017. As of April 2024, the country was ranked 166 out of 211 countries. This was a drop of 1 place from February 2024. Papua New Guinea had previously left the FIFA rankings, having not competed in a match between July 2007 and August 2011. Their matches at the 2015 Pacific Games saw them return to the rankings, and they competed in the 2016 OFC Nations Cup in June 2016; they reached the final, but lost to New Zealand 4–2 on penalties after the score was tied at 0–0 after extra time.

== History ==
=== 1963–1978 ===
The Papuan national team played its first match at the 1963 South Pacific Games, where it fell to Fiji 3-1 and was eliminated. At the 1966 South Pacific Games they reached the third place match but lost to the New Hebrides. Three years later they reached the same stage, and defeated the Fijian team 2-1 to win the bronze medal.

At 1971 South Pacific Games, after losing in the semi-finals to New Caledonia, they were beaten 8-1 by Tahiti in the third place game. Four years later, at the 1975 Games, they were beaten in the group stage by Tahiti and New Caledonia and thus eliminated in the first round.

=== 1979–1995 ===
At the 1979 South Pacific Games they lost in the quarter-finals 3–2 against the Solomon Islands, and in the first phase of the consolation tournament they were beaten 2–0 at the hands of the New Hebrides. The following year they played in the 1980 Oceania Cup, the precursor to the OFC Nations Cup, where despite beating the New Hebrides team, their losses to Australia and New Caledonia left them out at the first phase.

At 1983 South Pacific Games they lost the match for third place against the New Caledonian team. In the 1987 edition they won the bronze medal again by beating Vanuatu 3-1. Even so, in the two subsequent editions, 1991 and 1995, they were eliminated in the first phase.

=== 1996–2012 ===
After an absence in three editions of the OFC Nations Cup, due to the poor results obtained in the Melanesia Cup, they qualified for the 2002 tournament. They were only able to salvage a point in a 0-0 draw against the Solomon Islands and bowed out in the first round. In 2003 South Pacific Games they had a poor performance and in five games only obtained four points.

After not participating in 2007, which served as qualification for the 2008 OFC Nations Cup, they were eliminated in the first phase at 2011 Pacific Games by having worse goal difference than Tahiti, with whom they tied on points. In the 2012 OFC Nations Cup they drew with Fiji and lost to the Solomon Islands and New Zealand, again being eliminated in the group stage.

=== 2013–present ===
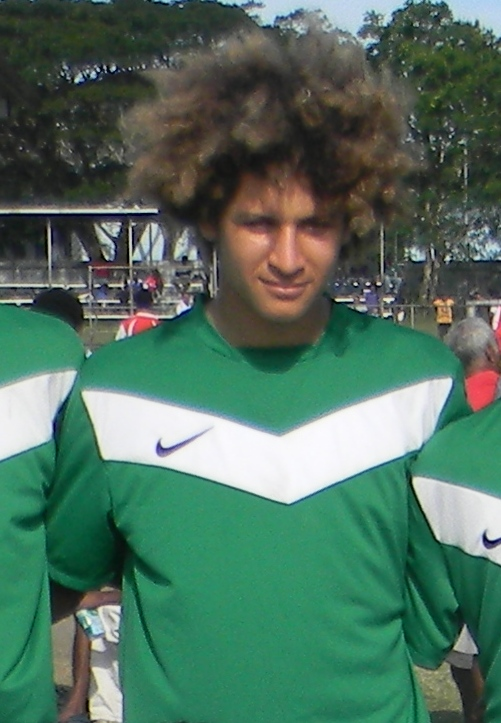
Alwin Komolong played numerous football matches for Papua New Guinea

In 2015, Papua New Guinea was designated to host the 2016 OFC Nations Cup. In the group stage, the Papuan team drew 1–1 with New Caledonia, 2–2 against Tahiti and beat Samoa 8–0. After achieving victory in the semi-finals, 2–1 against the Solomon Islands, they lost on penalties to New Zealand in the final after drawing 0–0 in regulation time. On 20 June 2023, Papua New Guinea suffered their worst defeat in their history losing to Malaysia 10–0 at the Sultan Mizan Zainal Abidin Stadium.

==== FIFA Series tournament ====
In 2024, Papua New Guinea played their first ever tournament outside Oceania where FIFA invited them to the 2024 FIFA Series matches on from 22 to 25 March 2024 held in Colombo where they would face Sri Lanka and Central African Republic.

== Kit sponsorship ==
Kit supplier	Period
(Spain) Joma	1998–2000
(Germany) Puma	2007–2010
(Italy) Lotto	2011
(United States) Nike	2012–2014
(N/A) OFC	2014
(United Kingdom) Kukuri	2015
None	2016
(Germany) Adidas	2017–2023
(Australia) Veto	2024–

== Results and fixtures ==
The following is a list of match results in the last 12 months, as well as any future matches that have been scheduled.

Win Draw Loss Fixture

=== 2025 ===
13 November 2025 MSG Prime Minister's Cup	Papua New Guinea	1–0	Solomon Islands	Port Moresby, Papua New Guinea
16:00 UTC+10	P. Paul 75'	Report		Stadium: PNG Football Stadium

20 November 2025 MSG Prime Minister's Cup semi-final	Papua New Guinea	2–0	Fiji	Port Moresby, Papua New Guinea
16:00 UTC+10	Gunemba 57', 64'	Report		Stadium: PNG Football Stadium

23 November 2025 MSG Prime Minister's Cup final	Papua New Guinea	2–2 (4–5 p)	Vanuatu	Port Moresby, Papua New Guinea
15:00 UTC+10	Kepo 56'; Paul 101'	Report	A. Saniel 20'; L. Tioni 94'	Stadium: Sir John Guise Stadium

=== 2026 ===
18 September 2026 MSG Prime Minister's Cup	Papua New Guinea	2–1	Vanuatu	Suva, Fiji
	Nalau Moses 85' Ezekiel Vela 87'	Report	Tony Kaltak 77'	Stadium: HFC Bank Stadium

24 September 2026 MSG Prime Minister's Cup	Papua New Guinea	v	New Caledonia	Suva, Fiji
				Stadium: HFC Bank Stadium

27 September 2026 MSG Prime Minister's Cup	Fiji	v	Papua New Guinea	Suva, Fiji
				Stadium: HFC Bank Stadium

30 September 2026 MSG Prime Minister's Cup	Papua New Guinea	v	Solomon Islands	Suva, Fiji
				Stadium: HFC Bank Stadium

== Coaching history ==
- (Papua New Guinea) Richard Tamari Nagai (1996–1998)
- (Papua New Guinea) John Davani (2002)
- (New Zealand) Steve Cain (2002)
- (Papua New Guinea) Ludwig Peka (2003–2004)
- (Brazil) Marcos Gusmão (2004–2011)
- (Australia) Frank Farina (2011–2013)
- (United States) Mike Keeney (2013)
- (New Zealand) Wynton Rufer (2014–2015)
- (Denmark) Flemming Serritslev (2015–2018)
- (Papua New Guinea) Bob Morris (2019–2021)
- (Brazil) Marcos Gusmão (2021–2022)
- (Australia) Warren Moon (2023–2024)
- (Spain) Felipe Vega-Arango (2024–2025)
- (Papua New Guinea) David Muta (2025–)

== Players ==
=== Current squad ===
The following players were called up for the 2026 FIFA World Cup qualification against Fiji on 14 November 2024 and against Solomon Islands on 17 November 2024.

Caps and goals correct as of 17 November 2024, after the match against Solomon Islands.

No.	Pos.	Player	Date of birth (age)	Caps	Goals	Club
	GK	Dave Tomare	26 April 1997 (age 29)	5	0	(Papua New Guinea Football Association) Hekari United
	GK	Charles Lepani	20 August 1994 (age 32)	1	0	(Papua New Guinea Football Association) Lae City
	GK	Christinus Biasu	2 June 1995 (age 31)	0	0	(Papua New Guinea Football Association) Hekari United
	DF	Daniel Joe	29 May 1990 (age 36)	37	0	(Papua New Guinea Football Association) Hekari United
	DF	Alwin Komolong	2 November 1994 (age 31)	30	2	(Football Australia) Queensland Lions
	DF	Kolu Kepo	15 July 1993 (age 33)	24	3	(Papua New Guinea Football Association) Hekari United
	DF	Joshua Talau	19 April 1996 (age 30)	9	0	(Papua New Guinea Football Association) Lae City
	DF	Nathaniel Eddie	unknown	3	0	(Papua New Guinea Football Association) Hekari United
	DF	Arol Tateng	5 April 1997 (age 29)	2	0	(Papua New Guinea Football Association) Southern Strikers
	DF	Derek Kimai	unknown	2	0	
	MF	Rex Naime	23 October 2003 (age 23)	11	0	(Papua New Guinea Football Association) Hekari United
	MF	Simon Oberth	1 January 2001 (age 25)	10	0	(Papua New Guinea Football Association) Hekari United
	MF	Joseph Joe	14 June 2002 (age 24)	7	1	(Papua New Guinea Football Association) Hekari United
	MF	Solomon Rani	22 May 2002 (age 24)	5	0	(Papua New Guinea Football Association) Hekari United
	MF	Shane Sakael	31 December 1992 (age 33)	3	0	(Papua New Guinea Football Association) Hekari United
	MF	Juduh Asar	unknown	2	0	
	MF	Ritzoki Tamgol	unknown	2	0	(Papua New Guinea Football Association) Port Moresby
	MF	Chappy Upaiga	unknown	0	0	
	MF	Ethan Mom	unknown	0	0	
	FW	Raymond Gunemba	4 June 1986 (age 40)	34	15	(Papua New Guinea Football Association) Lae City
	FW	Tommy Semmy	30 September 1994 (age 32)	28	10	(Football Australia) Melbourne Knights
	FW	Ati Kepo	15 January 1996 (age 30)	24	8	(Papua New Guinea Football Association) Hekari United
	FW	Logan Biwa	unknown	1	0	

=== Recent call-ups ===
The following players have also been called up to the Papua New Guinea squad within the last twelve months.

Pos.	Player	Date of birth (age)	Caps	Goals	Club	Latest call-up

== Player records ==
As of 20 November 2025
Statistics include official FIFA-recognised matches only.
Players in bold are still active with Papua New Guinea.

=== Most appearances ===
Rank	Name	Caps	Goals	Career
1	**Emmanuel Simon** (Note: Simon also played twice against Vanuatu B, matches that are not considered official by FIFA.)	41	4	2014–present
2	**Daniel Joe** (Note: Joe also played twice against Vanuatu B, matches that are not considered official by FIFA.)	39	1	2012–present
3	**Raymond Gunemba** (Note: Gunemba also played twice against Vanuatu B, scoring once, matches and goals that are not considered official by FIFA.)	37	18	2012–present
4	**Ronald Warisan** (Note: Warisan also played twice against Vanuatu B, matches that are not considered official by FIFA.)	36	0	2014–present
5	Michael Foster	31	7	2003–2022
6	**Alwin Komolong** (Note: Komolong also played once against Vanuatu B, a match that is not considered official by FIFA.)	30	3	2016–present
7	**Tommy Semmy**	27	10	2014–present
8	**Kolu Kepo**	26	4	2016–present
9	**Ati Kepo**	25	9	2019–present
10	**Felix Komolong**	23	0	2016–present

=== Top goalscorers ===
Rank	Name	Goals	Caps	Ratio	Career
1	**Raymond Gunemba** (Note: Gunemba also played twice against Vanuatu B, scoring once, matches and goals that are not considered official by FIFA.)	18	37	0.49	2012–present
2	Reggie Davani	13	17	0.76	2002–2012
3	**Tommy Semmy**	10	27	0.37	2014–present
4	**Nigel Dabinyaba** (Note: Dabinyaba also played once against Vanuatu B, scoring twice, a match and goals that are not considered official by FIFA.)	9	22	0.41	2014–present
4	**Ati Kepo**	9	25	0.36	2019–present
6	Michael Foster	7	31	0.23	2003–2022
7	Nathaniel Lepani	6	8	0.75	2004–2011
8	Neil Hans	5	8	0.63	2007–2014
8	Andrew Lepani	5	12	0.42	2003–2011
8	Mauri Wasi	5	14	0.36	2002–2014

== Competitive record ==
=== FIFA World Cup ===
FIFA World Cup record									FIFA World Cup qualification record						
Year	Result	Position	Pld	W	D	L	GF	GA	Pos	Pld	W	D	L	GF	GA
1930 to 1966	Not a FIFA member								Not a FIFA member						
1970 to 1994	Did not enter								Did not enter						
(France) 1998	Did not qualify								3rd	6	2	1	3	5	13
(South Korea) (Japan) 2002	Did not enter								Did not enter						
(Germany) 2006	Did not qualify								3rd	4	2	1	1	17	6
(South Africa) 2010	Disqualified								Disqualified						
(Brazil) 2014	Did not qualify								4th	3	0	1	2	2	4
(Russia) 2018	Did not qualify								3rd	9	3	3	3	19	13
(Qatar) 2022	Did not qualify								3rd	4	2	0	2	5	5
(Canada) (Mexico) (United States) 2026	Did not qualify								7th	3	0	1	2	5	8
(Morocco) (Portugal) (Spain) 2030	To be determined								To be determined						
(Saudi Arabia) 2034	To be determined								To be determined						
Total		0/14								29	9	7	13	53	49

* Although initially listed by FIFA as having entered the 2010 World Cup, PNG did not enter the football tournament at the 2007 South Pacific Games, which was used as the preliminary round of the Oceanian zone qualification tournament.

=== OFC Nations Cup ===
Oceania Cup / OFC Nations Cup record										Qualification record					
Year	Round	Position	Pld	W	D	L	GF	GA	Squad	Pld	W	D	L	GF	GA
(New Zealand) 1973	Did not enter									No qualification					
(New Caledonia) 1980	Group stage	6th	3	1	0	2	6	22	—N/a	No qualification					
(Pacific Community) 1996	Did not qualify									4	1	1	2	2	4
(Australia) 1998	Did not qualify									4	1	1	2	3	6
(French Polynesia) 2000	Did not qualify									4	0	0	4	4	19
(New Zealand) 2002	Group stage	7th	3	0	1	2	2	12	Squad	4	4	0	0	20	2
(Australia) 2004	Did not qualify									4	2	1	1	17	6
(Pacific Community) 2008	Disqualified									Disqualified					
(Solomon Islands) 2012	Group stage	7th	3	0	1	2	2	4	Squad	Qualified automatically					
(Papua New Guinea) 2016	Runners-up	2nd	5	2	3	0	13	4	Squad	Qualified automatically					
(Fiji) (Vanuatu) 2024	Group stage	5th	3	1	1	1	4	7	Squad	Qualified automatically					
Total	Runners-up	5/11	17	4	6	7	27	49	—	20	8	3	9	46	37

*Denotes draws include knockout matches decided via penalty shoot-out.

=== Pacific Games ===
Pacific Games record
Year	Round	Position	Pld	W	D	L	GF	GA
(Fiji) 1963	1st round	5th	1	0	0	1	1	3
(New Caledonia) 1966	Fourth place	4th	4	1	0	3	14	14
(Papua New Guinea) 1969	Third place	3rd	6	3	1	2	11	10
(French Polynesia) 1971	Fourth place	4th	3	1	1	1	19	11
(Guam) 1975	Group stage	6th	2	0	0	2	3	9
(Fiji) 1979	Quarter-finals	5th	3	1	1	1	15	3
(Samoa) 1983	Fourth place	4th	4	1	0	3	22	10
(New Caledonia) 1987	Third place	3rd	6	3	2	1	26	4
(Papua New Guinea) 1991	Group stage	5th	3	1	1	1	3	2
(French Polynesia) 1995	Group stage	6th	3	1	1	1	11	5
(Fiji) 2003	Group stage	6th	4	1	1	2	12	7
(Samoa) 2007	Disqualified							
(New Caledonia) 2011	Group stage	6th	4	2	1	1	22	4
(Papua New Guinea) 2015	See Papua New Guinea national under-23 team							
(Samoa) 2019	Fourth place	4th	5	3	1	1	17	3
(Solomon Islands) 2023	Group stage	6th	4	2	1	1	7	3
Total	Third place	14/16	52	20	11	30	183	88

=== MSG Prime Minister's Cup ===
MSG Prime Minister's Cup record
Year	Round	Position	Pld	W	D	L	GF	GA
(Solomon Islands) 1988	Did not enter							
(Fiji) 1989	Fourth place	4th	4	1	1	2	5	4
(New Caledonia) 1990	Fifth place	5th	4	0	0	4	1	5
(Vanuatu) 1992	Did not enter							
(Solomon Islands) 1994	Third place	3rd	4	1	1	2	2	4
(Vanuatu) 1998	Fourth place	4th	4	1	1	2	3	6
(Fiji) 2000	Fifth place	5th	4	0	0	4	4	19
(Vanuatu) 2022	Champions	1st	4	3	1	0	7	4
(New Caledonia) 2023	Fourth place	4th	3	0	0	3	2	7
(Solomon Islands) 2024	Champions	1st	4	3	1	0	7	4
(Papua New Guinea) 2025	Second place	2nd	3	2	1	0	5	2
Total	Participations	9/11	34	11	6	17	36	55

== Honours ==
=== Continental ===
- OFC Nations Cup
  - (silver) Runners-up (1): 2016

=== Subcontinental ===
- Pacific Games
  - (bronze) Bronze medal (2): 1969, 1987
- Pacific Mini Games
  - (bronze) Bronze medal (1): 1981
- Melanesia Cup / MSG Prime Minister's Cup
  - (gold) Champions (2): 2022, 2024
  - (silver) Runners-up (1): 2025
  - (bronze) Third place (1): 1994

=== Summary ===
Including honours in competitions directly organized/recognized by FIFA or an affiliated confederation.

Competition	1st place, gold medalist(s)	2nd place, silver medalist(s)	3rd place, bronze medalist(s)	Total
OFC Nations Cup	0	1	0	1
Total	0	1	0	1

== Head-to-head record ==
Team	Pld	W	D	L	GF	GA	GD	WPCT
American Samoa	3	3	0	0	37	0	+37	100.00
Australia	1	0	0	1	2	11	−9	0.00
Central African Republic	1	0	0	1	0	4	−4	0.00
China	2	0	1	1	2	5	−3	0.00
Chinese Taipei	2	0	2	0	3	3	0	0.00
Cook Islands	3	3	0	0	23	1	+22	100.00
Fiji	25	5	7	13	25	46	−21	20.00
Guam	1	1	0	0	9	0	+9	100.00
Indonesia	2	1	0	1	3	8	−5	50.00
Iran	1	0	0	1	1	8	−7	0.00
Kiribati	2	2	0	0	30	1	+29	100.00
Liberia	1	1	0	0	2	1	+1	100.00
Malaysia	5	1	0	4	5	27	−22	20.00
Federated States of Micronesia	1	1	0	0	10	0	+10	100.00
New Caledonia	20	4	2	14	18	55	−37	20.00
New Zealand	6	1	1	4	3	19	−16	16.67
Niue	1	1	0	0	19	0	+19	100.00
North Korea	1	0	0	1	0	4	−4	0.00
Philippines	1	0	0	1	0	5	−5	0.00
Samoa (Note: Includes results as Western Samoa.)	6	6	0	0	28	4	+24	100.00
Singapore	3	0	1	2	7	11	−4	0.00
Solomon Islands	27	7	5	15	35	45	−10	25.93
Sri Lanka	1	0	1	0	0	0	0	0.00
Tahiti	17	1	5	11	19	50	−31	5.88
Thailand	1	1	0	0	4	1	+3	100.00
Tonga	4	3	1	0	20	2	+18	75.00
Tuvalu	1	1	0	0	3	0	+3	100.00
Vanuatu (Note: Includes results as New Hebrides.)	25	10	6	9	33	37	−4	40.00
Wallis and Futuna	3	3	0	0	16	1	+15	100.00
Total	167	56	32	79	357	349	+8	33.53

Source: Results

== Historical kits ==
1996 Home	2002 Home	2004	2011 Home	2014 Home	2014 Away	2015 Home	2015 Away

2017 Home	2017 Away	2022 Home	2022 Away	2022 Third	2024 Home	2024 Away

== See also ==
- Papua New Guinea women's national soccer team
