= Sashi Mahendra Singh =

Fijian football coach (1920–1990)

Personal information
- Date of birth: 1920
- Date of death: 1990 (aged 69–70)

Managerial career
- Years: Team
- 1960–1976: Fiji

Sashi Mahendra Singh (1920–1990) was a Fijian football coach who managed the national team. He was nicknamed "the Father of Ba Soccer".

Singh was an Indo-Fijian, the father of Billy Singh who also managed the national team.
