= Wally Hughes =

Football manager (1934–2011)

Personal information
- Full name: Walter Cyril Joseph Hughes
- Date of birth: 15 March 1934
- Place of birth: Liverpool, England
- Date of death: 21 January 2011 (aged 76)
- Place of death: Auckland, New Zealand
- Position: Right winger

Senior career*
Years	Team	Apps	(Gls)
1955–1956	Sheffield United	2	(0)
1956–1957	Bradford Park Avenue A.F.C.		
1957–1958	Southport F.C.		

Managerial career
- 1977–1978: New Zealand
- 1981–1982: Fiji
- * Club domestic league appearances and goals

Walter Cyril Joseph Hughes (15 March 1934 – 21 January 2011) was an association football player and coach who managed the New Zealand national team.

== Playing career ==
Hughes was born and raised in Liverpool and joined Liverpool, initially as ground staff, but later earned a playing contract. He failed to make an appearance for the first team, and moved to Stockport County where he again failed to make the first team squad. Hughes then joined Sheffield United, making just two appearances. He then had spells with Bradford Park Avenue A.F.C. and Southport F.C. He played as a right winger.

== Coaching career ==
In 1973 Hughes emigrated to New Zealand and took up the role of head coach of Dunedin City in the Southern League. After two seasons he became Northern Regional coach and then in 1977 he was appointed coach of the New Zealand national football team, replacing Barrie Truman for the 1978 FIFA World Cup qualifying campaign. Hughes first took charge of the New Zealand side February 1977, winning six, losing five of his 12 games in charge, with one draw.

After Hughes stepped down following a tour of New Zealand by England B he coached Blockhouse Bay in the National league. He then took an appointment in Dubai for two years before returning to the South Pacific to take charge of Fiji for their failed 1982 FIFA World Cup qualifying campaign.

Hughes also coached New Zealand club sides Auckland City FC, East Coast Bays AFC, Auckland University and Manurewa AFC.
