= Billy Singh =

Managerial career
- Years: Team
- 1988: Fiji
- 1998–2002: Fiji
Medal record
Men's football
Representing Fiji (as manager)
OFC Nations Cup
Bronze medal – third place	1998

Billy Singh was a Fijian football coach who managed the national team, including for their famous victory against Australia in 1988. Singh died before November 2010. Singh was an Indo-Fijian, the son of Sashi Mahendra Singh who also managed the national team.

== Honours ==
=== Manager ===
Fiji

- OFC Nations Cup: third-place 1998
