= 1994 Melanesia Cup =

Tournament details
- Host country: Solomon Islands
- Dates: 3–8 July
- Teams: 5 (from 1 confederation)

Final positions
- Champions: Solomon Islands (1st title)
- Runners-up: Fiji
- Third place: Papua New Guinea

Tournament statistics
- Matches played: 10
- Goals scored: 30 (3 per match)

The 1994 Melanesia Cup was the fifth international association football championship for national teams from Melanesia. Hosted by the Solomon Islands, the competition ran from 3–8 July 1994 and was contested by the national teams of Fiji, New Caledonia, the Solomon Islands, Papua New Guinea and Vanuatu.

The round-robin tournament, which served as the qualifying round for the 1996 OFC Nations Cup, began with the first round of matches on 3 July 1994 and ended with the final round of matches on 8 July 1994.

Hosts the Solomon Islands won the competition for the first time after defeating New Caledonia 3–1 in their final match to complete a clean sweep – four wins in four matches. As winners of the competition, the Solomon Islands qualified for the OFC Nations Cup.

== Background ==
The first edition of the Melanesia Cup took place in the Solomon Islands in 1988. Fiji were the defending champions after winning the fourth edition of the competition in 1992. They were also the most successful team in the history of the competition having won three of the first four editions. Prior to 1994, the host nation had not won the competition.

== Format ==
The tournament was played as a round-robin where each team would play all of the others once. The winner would be decided by the total number of points obtained across all matches played. The winner of the competition would qualify for the 1996 OFC Nations Cup.

=== Participants ===
- Fiji
- New Caledonia
- Papua New Guinea
- Solomon Islands
- Vanuatu

== Summary ==
In the opening match on 3 July, Papua New Guinea defeated New Caledonia 1–0. The following day, Fiji defeated New Caledonia 3–1. On 5 July, New Caledonia won 3–2 against Vanuatu while the Solomon Islands won 2–0 against Papua New Guinea. The following day, the Solomon Islands defeated Vanuatu 4–0 and Fiji won 1–0 against Papua New Guinea. With more than half the matches played, Fiji and the Solomon Islands were tied at the top with six points from a possible six. With the two still to play each other, they were the only two still in contention to qualify for the OFC Nations Cup. New Caledonia and Papua New Guinea both had three points but only had one match each left to play and Vanuatu were bottom with no points.

On July 7, the Solomon Islands seized the initiative by defeating Fiji 1–0 which left them needing just a point in their final match to win the title. Vanuatu and Papua New Guinea drew 1–1. The following day Fiji won 4–2 against Vanuatu and the Solomon Islands won the title, thus qualifying for the OFC Nations Cup, by defeating New Caledonia 3–1.

== Table ==
Pos	Team	Pld	W	D	L	GF	GA	GD	Pts	Qualification
1	Solomon Islands	4	4	0	0	10	1	+9	12	Qualififcation for 1996 OFC Nations Cup
2	Fiji	4	3	0	1	8	4	+4	9	
3	Papua New Guinea	4	1	1	2	2	4	−2	4	
4	New Caledonia	4	1	0	3	5	9	−4	3	
5	Vanuatu	4	0	1	3	5	12	−7	1	

== Matches ==
3 July 1994

Papua New Guinea	1–0	New Caledonia

4 July 1994

Fiji	3–1	New Caledonia

5 July 1994

New Caledonia	3–2	Vanuatu

5 July 1994

Solomon Islands	2–0	Papua New Guinea

6 July 1994

Solomon Islands	4–0	Vanuatu

6 July 1994

Fiji	1–0	Papua New Guinea

7 July 1994

Vanuatu	1–1	Papua New Guinea

7 July 1994

Solomon Islands	1–0	Fiji

8 July 1994

Fiji	4–2	Vanuatu

8 July 1994

Solomon Islands	3–1	New Caledonia
