= Fiji national football team =

Men's association football team representing Fiji

Fiji
- Nickname: Bula Boys
- Association: Fiji Football Association (Fiji FA)
- Confederation: OFC (Oceania)
- Head coach: Stéphane Auvray
- Captain: Roy Krishna
- Most caps: Roy Krishna (68)
- Top scorer: Roy Krishna (47)
- Home stadium: HFC Bank Stadium
- FIFA code: FIJ
First colours	Second colours

FIFA ranking
- Current: 154 ▲1 (7 October 2026)
- Highest: 94 (July 1994)
- Lowest: 199 (July 2015)

First international
- Fiji 4–6 New Zealand (Suva, Fiji; 7 October 1951)

Biggest win
- Fiji 24–0 Kiribati (Nausori, Fiji; 30 August 1979)

Biggest defeat
- New Zealand 13–0 Fiji (Auckland, New Zealand; 16 August 1981)

OFC Nations Cup
- Appearances: 9 (first in 1973)
- Best result: Third place (1998, 2008)

Pacific Games
- Appearances: 14 (first in 1963)
- Best result: Champions (1991, 2003)

Melanesia Cup / MSG Prime Minister's Cup
- Appearances: 10 (first in 1988)
- Best result: Melanesia Cup: Champions (1988, 1989, 1992, 1998, 2000); MSG Prime Minister's Cup: Champions (2026)
Medal record
Men's football
OFC Nations Cup
Third place	1998 Australia
Third place	2008 Oceania
Pacific Games
Gold medal – first place	1991 Papua New Guinea
Gold medal – first place	2003 Fiji
Silver medal – second place	1963 Fiji
Silver medal – second place	1979 Fiji
Silver medal – second place	1983 Western Samoa
Silver medal – second place	2007 Samoa
Bronze medal – third place	1995 Tahiti
Bronze medal – third place	2019 Samoa
Bronze medal – third place	2023 Solomon Islands
Pacific Mini Games
Silver medal – second place	1993 Vanuatu
Silver medal – second place	2017 Vanuatu
Melanesian Cup/MSG Prime Minister's Cup
Winner	1988 Solomon Islands
Winner	1989 Vanuatu
Winner	1992 Vanuatu
Winner	1998 Vanuatu
Winner	2000 Fiji
Winner	2026 Fiji
Runner-up	1994 Solomon Islands
Runner-up	2024 Solomon Islands
Third place	1990 New Caledonia
Third place	2022 Vanuatu
Third place	2025 Papua New Guinea

The Fiji men's national football team (Fijian: timi ni soka ni Viti) represents Fiji in international men's association football. It is controlled by the governing body of football in Fiji, the Fiji Football Association. The team plays most of their home games at the HFC Bank Stadium in Suva.

Fiji first participated in the FIFA World Cup qualification in 1982; since 1990, Fiji have attempted to qualify for each World Cup without success. Their best result was a final round appearance in 2010. The national team also represents Fiji at the OFC Nations Cup, having appeared in nine out of eleven previous tournaments. Fiji's best result is a third-place finish at the 1998 and 2008 editions. They have won the Melanesia Cup five times and competed in the Pacific Games from 1963 until 2015 when the competition became an under-23 tournament.

As in most countries in Oceania where football (or soccer) is not the most popular sport (such as Australia and New Zealand), Fiji's most popular sport is rugby union. As of 2026, Fiji has never qualified for the FIFA World Cup. In spite of this, the country's youth football team has enjoyed recent success, qualifying for both the 2015 and 2023 FIFA U-20 World Cups and the 2016 Olympic football tournaments.

== History ==
=== Beginnings (1951–1973) ===
Fiji's first international football game was against a New Zealand side that was touring Oceania and had played four games against New Caledonia. The international, which took place on 7 October 1951, saw New Zealand getting the win 6-4. Jock Newall got a hat-trick for New Zealand. New Zealand returned the following year, with Fiji losing all three games, including a 9–0 drubbing in the second match.

After being absent from the international game for eleven years, the Fiji Football Association joined FIFA in 1963. That same year, the national team entered the first edition of the South Pacific Games, held in Fiji. In that tournament, the country appeared in its first gold medal match after defeating Papua New Guinea and the Solomon Islands, but lost the match to New Caledonia 8–2. Marc-Kanyan Case scored four goals for the opposition and Fiji was relegated to silver.

After missing 1966, the team's next tournament appearance was in the 1969 Games held in Port Moresby, Papua New Guinea. They finished in fourth place out of six teams after losing to Papua New Guinea in the bronze medal playoff. Two years later, Fiji finished at the bottom of Group two with losses against New Caledonia and New Hebrides. They would, however, defeat the Cook Islands in the fifth place play-off.

=== World Cup qualifying debut and Oceania upsets (1973–1991) ===
As a member of the Oceania Football Confederation, Fiji played in the first edition of the OFC Nations Cup held in New Zealand in 1973. They did not win a match in the four games they played during the tournament. Competing at the 1975 South Pacific Games the national team, under coach Sashi Mahendra Singh, made the semi-finals of the competition where they lost to Tahiti. In the third-place playoff, they lost to the Solomon Islands by a goal.

After John Lal became the new coach for Fiji in 1977, his first match as coach was an unofficial game against Taiwan which ended in a two-all draw before taking on Australia who played Taiwan because of the soccer ban in the country. On 19 March 1977, they took on Australia at Buckhurst Park. Seven national players from Ba F.C. were unavailable due to a planned tour of New Zealand. After holding off the Australians for the first forty-five minutes, Jimmy Okete (who was making his debut) scored the only goal of the game. This was a shock to the locals since the team struggled in the two tours to Australia in 1961 and 1968 against the state teams.

Under the orders of new coach, Moti Musadilal, they played some pre-tournament friendlies against New Zealand conceding nine goals in the two games before competing at the 1979 South Pacific Games in Suva. After getting a nil all draw against Papua New Guinea, they scored their biggest win against Kiribati winning by twenty-four goals. After defeating Wallis and Futuna in the quarter-finals and Solomon Islands in the semis, they made it to their second Pacific Games final against Tahiti. In front of over twenty thousand people, Fiji came up short again with Erroll Bennett scoring a double to give Tahiti the gold medal.

Fiji's next tournament was the 1980 OFC Nations Cup where they were grouped with New Zealand, Solomon Islands and Tahiti. After defeating the Solomon Islands in the opening game, they were expected to lose against New Zealand who were the favourites to win the group. On 27 February 1980, they became the first Fijian team to defeat a New Zealand team with Dewan Chand and Meli Vuilabasa both scoring two goals in the victory. Fiji did not make it to the final. They lost first to Tahiti 6–3, and then lost the third-place playoff to New Caledonia 2–1, in what was the last Oceania Cup for sixteen years.

The following year saw a new coach with former New Zealand coach Wally Hughes leading the team into their first World Cup qualifiers. After opening with a four-goal defeat against New Zealand, they drew with Indonesia nil-all, before defeating Chinese Taipei 2–1 to be in third place with three points. For Fiji that momentum was short-lived. They finished at the bottom of the group after conceding twenty-three goals in the final two games against Australia and New Zealand. Hughes resigned after the Australian game stating, "I wouldn't wish on any coach what I have been through," suggesting that bribery was involved in the defeat to Australia.

After two years absence from international football, the national team, under Rudi Gutendorf, competed at the 1983 South Pacific Games in Samoa. After finishing top of the group that featured New Caledonia, Solomon Islands and Vanuatu, they defeated Papua New Guinea 2–0 in the quarter-finals before knocking off New Caledonia in the semi-final. In the final, they lost to Tahiti by a single goal which was contested by the players who attacked the referee and linesmen. Another similar incident in a friendly against New Zealand happened the following year. This led to a one-year ban of international matches being held at Fiji.

Fiji's next tournament was the 1988 Melanesia Cup held in the Solomon Islands. The national team won the final against the Solomon Islands 3–1 to claim their first title. Later in that year, they competed in the first round of the 1990 FIFA World Cup qualification against Australia, with the motivation of five hundred Fijian dollars bonus for each player if they won. In front of six thousand people, they defeated Australia 1–0 with Ravuame Madigi scoring the goal to take the lead heading into the second leg. The second leg though saw Australia take out the match by a score of 5–1 in what media called the "Battle of Newcastle". It included an all-in brawl in the last part of the match which saw Charlie Yankos get a broken nose.

After claiming the 1989 Melanesia Cup at home, in the following year they finished in third place behind Vanuatu and New Caledonia. The team headed to Tahiti for the 1991 South Pacific Games where they finished top of the group before defeating Vanuatu in the semi-finals. In the final, they took on the Solomon Islands where Radike Nawalu scored the opening goal of the game in the 29th minute to give Fiji the lead. The game went to penalties with Fiji winning the gold for the first time.

=== Melanesia powerhouse (1991–2003) ===
Fiji competed at the 1994 FIFA World Cup qualification in Group B with Vanuatu and New Zealand. After losing to New Zealand in the opening game of qualifying at Christchurch, they headed off to Vanuatu to compete at the 1992 Melanesia Cup. They took the cup for the third time with the difference being one goal over New Caledonia. After a 3–0 win over Vanuatu in Suva, they tied with New Zealand at the same ground. In the final game of the group, they defeated Vanuatu in Port Vila by the same scoreline. That game was a dead rubber as they finished behind New Zealand and were eliminated from contention.

After not qualifying for the 1996 OFC Nations Cup having finished second at the 1994 Melanesia Cup, at the 1995 South Pacific Games in Tahiti Fiji won the bronze medal by defeating Vanuatu in the bronze medal playoff.

Attempting to qualify for the 1998 FIFA World Cup, Fiji got a bye into the second round of qualifying where they were paired with New Zealand and Papua New Guinea. The top team qualified for the third round. The nation finished in second place with losses to New Zealand both at home (1–0) and away (5–0) being the critical factors in their elimination. Fiji's next tournament was the 1998 OFC Nations Cup after they qualified by taking out the 1998 Melanesia Cup held in Vanuatu. The only blemish being a one–all draw against the Solomon Islands.

After losing to the hosts (Australia) 3–0 in their first game, they defeated the Cook Islands 3–1 to secure a semi-final spot where they fell to New Zealand by a single goal. This put them into the third-place playoff where they defeated Tahiti for their best result to date at the OFC Nations Cup with a third-place. Esala Masi was the top goalscorer for the tournament with three goals. Fiji qualified for the following edition of the Nations Cup after winning the title at the 2000 Melanesia Cup in Fiji. But later that year, Fiji withdrew because of political unrest in the country, which led to the 2000 Fijian coup d'état.

Fiji's qualification for the 2002 FIFA World Cup started at Coffs Harbour when they were grouped with American Samoa, Australia, Samoa and Tonga in Group one. In the opening game of the group, they defeated American Samoa 13–0 to record their biggest win in a FIFA match. Shailemdra Lal scored five goals; Esala Masi scored four. After defeating Samoa 6–1, they lost to Australia 2–0 to finish in second place and were eliminated from contention. Only the top team from the group qualified through to the second round. They met Australia again at the 2002 OFC Nations Cup in New Zealand. They finished in third place in the group after only winning against New Caledonia followed by an 8–0 loss against Australia. This eliminated Fiji from the semi-finals and saw the sack of Billy Singh ending a seven-year reign in his third stint as coach of the national team.

Fiji claimed the 2003 South Pacific Games gold medal at home. The squad, which consisted mostly of young players, was able to go unbeaten throughout the tournament defeating New Caledonia in the gold medal match. Esala Masi was Fiji's top scorer for Fiji with twelve goals which included the seven in the 12–0 win over Kiribati in the group stage.

=== Recent times (2004–) ===
Fiji's qualification for the 2006 FIFA World Cup started in Samoa. They finished in second place in the qualifying group which featured Vanuatu, Papua New Guinea, Samoa and American Samoa. Their only loss was against Vanuatu on the final match-day. This meant that Fiji qualified through to the 2004 OFC Nations Cup. After drawing with Tahiti and getting a win over Vanuatu, their World Cup chance ended when Fiji lost the next three matches and were eliminated at the second stage of qualifying.

Fiji's next tournament was the 2007 South Pacific Games in Samoa, which was also the first round of qualifying for the 2010 FIFA World Cup in South Africa. After getting safely through the group, which included Tuvalu, Tahiti, Cook Islands and New Caledonia, they took on Vanuatu for a spot in the semi-finals to qualify for the next round. In the semi-finals, they defeated Vanuatu to advance to the second round of qualifying with a three-goal victory, confirming their spot in the gold medal match. They lost by a single goal to New Caledonia, however, to finish runner-up for the fourth time.

The second round of qualifying got off to a rocky start. Goalkeeper, Simione Tamanisau was refused entry because his father had been linked to the 2006 Fijian coup d'état. The match was moved to the end of the qualifying period with Fiji winning 2–0. During that reschedule, the national team played the rest of their World Cup games. The team finished in third place in the group after getting only one point in their first three games—a three-all draw against New Caledonia. This was a key factor as the later 4–0 loss to the same team ended their hopes for qualifying to the next stage.

Under the guidance of Gurjit Singh, the team competed at the 2011 Pacific Games in New Caledonia. In the group stage, the team qualified for the semi-finals with a game to spare as they would go through with a clean sweep of wins. In the semi-finals, they took the lead against the Solomon Islands in the sixty-ninth minute of play with a goal by Maciu Dunadamu. But goals from Joses Nawo and Henry Fa'arodo, however, gave the Solomon Islands the win and a spot in the gold medal match. Fiji finished in fourth place losing to Tahiti in the bronze medal match 2–1.

Juan Carlos Buzzetti returned to Fiji's top job as he led the team to the 2012 OFC Nations Cup. This was also the second part of qualifying for the 2014 FIFA World Cup. Competing in Group B, they lost the opening game to New Zealand. The only goalscorer of the match was Kiwi player Tommy Smith in the eleventh minute. After a nil-all draw against the Solomon Islands, they got their only goal of the tournament with Maciu Dunadamu opening the scoring against Papua New Guinea in the fifteenth minute. But a late goal from Kema Jack ended the tournament for Fiji with a draw and knocked them out in the group stage.

After not competing in a senior international for three years, the national team had two friendlies against A-League side Wellington Phoenix before entering their under-23 squad for the 2015 Pacific Games in Papua New Guinea. This was also a qualifier for the 2016 Summer Olympics in Brazil. After losing the opening game, they got a draw in the second match with Roy Krishna and Ilimotama Jese each scoring a goal for Fiji. More friendlies took place before the national team headed to Papua New Guinea for the 2016 OFC Nations Cup. This was also the second round of qualification for the 2018 World Cup. With a squad that only had three outside of the National League, Fiji lost the opening game against New Zealand with Krishna getting the only goal in the 3–1 loss. After defeating the Solomon Islands in their second game with a Krishna goal, they needed to at least draw Vanuatu in the final group game to have a chance at qualifying to the semis. After almost getting the early lead from Krishna, Fiji fell behind by two goals from Dominique Fred and Fenedy Masauvakalo giving Vanuatu the lead. The second half saw Fiji tie the match at two-all as goals from Samuela Kautoga and Krishna gave the team hope of qualifying. But Fiji was eliminated from the competition as a penalty in the 75th minute by Brian Kaltack gave Vanuatu a spot in the semis by goal difference.

For finishing third place, they qualified through to the 2018 FIFA World Cup qualification third round. Fiji was drawn to face New Zealand and New Caledonia in Group A. Before the first game against New Zealand, Frank Farina was replaced by Christophe Gamel in the top job with Gamel stating, "We respect our opponents and we know that they are strong" in his first press conference as manager. Fiji only got a single point from their four games. That point was against New Caledonia at Lautoka with the game ending in a two–all draw.

In July 2025, Fiji was invited by Football Association of Thailand to compete in the 2025 King's Cup held in September 2025.

== Team image ==
=== Kit sponsorship ===
Kit lier	Period
(England) Umbro	1981–????
(N/A) White	2001–2005
(Germany) Puma	2005–2007
(Italy) Lotto	2008–2011
(Germany) Puma	2012
(Italy) Kappa	2012–2025
(Fiji) Unitex	2024
(United States) Custom Athletics	2025–

=== Home stadium ===
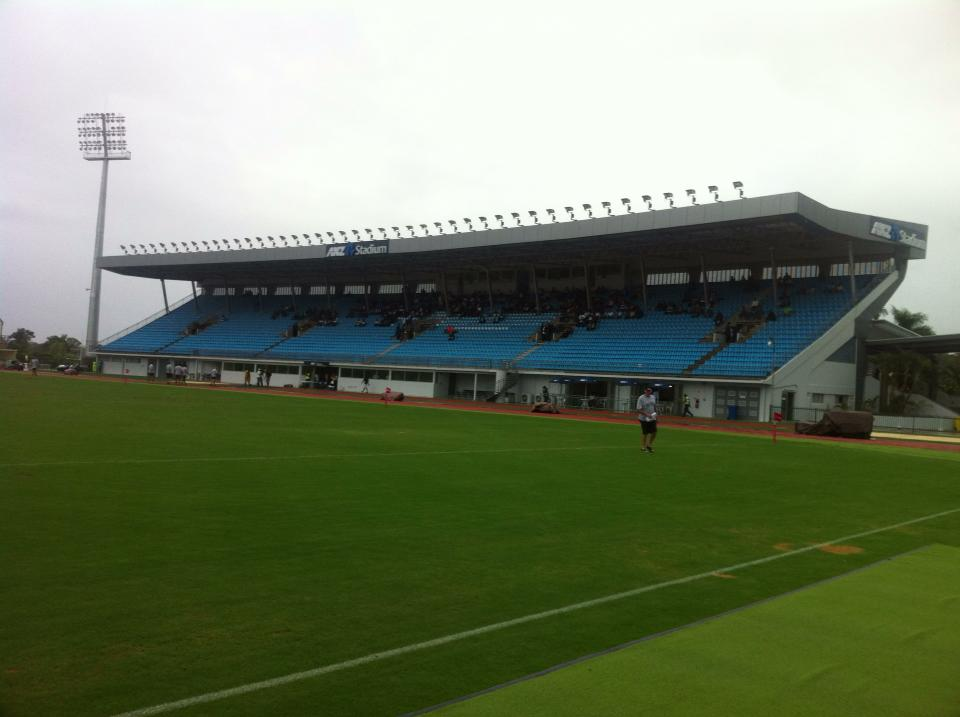
HFC Bank Stadium in Suva, Fiji, hosts all of Fiji national matches.

The first soccer international held in Fiji was held at Albert Park, when New Zealand took on the hosts in 1951. The stadium, the main centre in Fiji during the early 20th century, was also the home of cricket and of the country's first Rugby union test match in 1926.

In modern times, most games hosted by Fiji are held at the HFC Bank Stadium, which was built in 1951 and has been renovated twice which can hold a capacity of 15,000. The first renovation was in 1978 for the 1979 South Pacific Games held in Suva. A second renovation took place in 2012 sponsored by ANZ Fiji at a cost 17.5 million Fijian dollars in exchange for the stadium's naming rights. The football team has also played games at Lautoka, Ba, Nausori and Labasa.

== Results and fixtures ==
The following is a list of match results in the last 12 months, as well as any future matches that have been scheduled.

Win Draw Loss Fixture

=== 2025 ===
15 November 2025 MSG Prime Minister's Cup	Papua New Guinea development team	0–1	Fiji	Port Moresby, Papua New Guinea
16:00 UTC+10		Report	Vasconcellos 8'	Stadium: Sir John Guise Stadium

17 November 2025 MSG Prime Minister's Cup	Vanuatu	2–0	Fiji	Port Moresby, Papua New Guinea
16:00 UTC+10	K. Kaltack 50'; Iawak 62' (pen.)	Report		Stadium: PNG Football Stadium

20 November 2025 MSG Prime Minister's Cup semi-final	Papua New Guinea	2–0	Fiji	Port Moresby, Papua New Guinea
16:00 UTC+10	Gunemba 57', 64'	Report		Stadium: PNG Football Stadium

22 November 2025 MSG Prime Minister's Cup third place match	Fiji	Abandoned (1–1)	Solomon Islands	Port Moresby, Papua New Guinea
17:00 UTC+10	Wasasala 22' (pen.)	Report	Boyers 35' (pen.)	Stadium: PNG Football Stadium

=== 2026 ===
6 June Friendly	Vanuatu	2–1	Fiji	Port Vila, Vanuatu
16:30 UTC+11	Saniel 67'; Dunn 82' (o.g.)	Report	Mohammed 78'	Stadium: Freshwater Stadium; Referee: Médéric Lacour (New Caledonia)

9 June Friendly	Vanuatu	2–2	Fiji	Port Vila, Vanuatu
16:30 UTC+11	Soromon 35'; Saniel 49'		Thomas 21' (o.g.); Krishna 40'	Stadium: Freshwater Stadium

18 September 2026 MSG Prime Minister's Cup	Fiji	3–3	Solomon Islands	Suva, Fiji
	Roy Krishna 27'; Maikah Dau 42'; Thomas Dunn 54'; Tevita Waranivalu (red card)	Report	Rooney Riugaemai 41' (pen.); Jayroll Patti 82'; Javin Wae 90+10'	Stadium: HFC Bank Stadium

21 September 2026 MSG Prime Minister's Cup	Fiji	0–1	Vanuatu	Suva, Fiji
				Stadium: HFC Bank Stadium

27 September 2026 MSG Prime Minister's Cup	Fiji	2–0	Papua New Guinea	Suva, Fiji
				Stadium: HFC Bank Stadium

30 September 2026 MSG Prime Minister's Cup	Fiji	2–1	New Caledonia	Suva, Fiji
				Stadium: HFC Bank Stadium

3 October 2026 MSG Prime Minister's Cup	Fiji	1–0	Vanuatu	Suva, Fiji
				Stadium: HFC Bank Stadium

== Current technical staff ==
Coaching Staff
Head coach	(Guadeloupe) Stéphane Auvray
Technical Director	(France) David Baltase
Team Manager	(Fiji) Kartik Reddy
Assistant coach	(Fiji) Marika Rodu
Goalkeeping coach	(Fiji) Sanaila Waqanicakau
Physiotherapist	(India) Noel Augustine

=== Coaching history ===
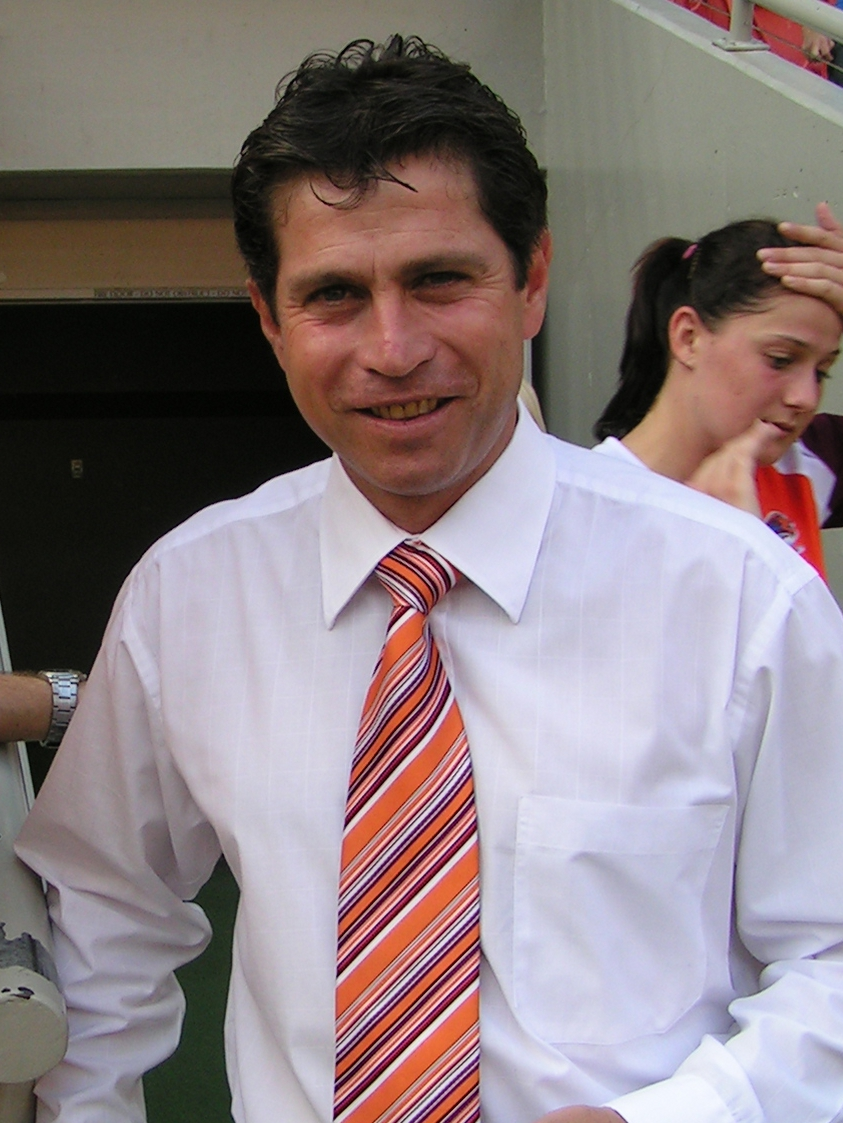
Frank Farina became the manager of the national football team of Fiji in 2015

- (Fiji) Sashi Mahendra Singh (1960–1972)
- (Fiji) Mohammed Ali Sahu Khan (1972–1974)
- (Fiji) Sashi Mahendra Singh (1974–1976)
- (Fiji) John Lal (1977–1978)
- (Fiji) Moti Musadilal (1979)
- (Fiji) Sashi Mahendra Singh (1980)
- (New Zealand) Wally Hughes (1981–1982)
- (West Germany) Rudi Gutendorf (1983)
- (Fiji) Michael Thoman (1983–1984)
- (Fiji) Billy Singh (1985–1986)
- (West Germany) Rudi Gutendorf (1987)
- (Fiji) Billy Singh (1987–1992)
- (Scotland) Danny McLennan (1993–1995)
- (Fiji) Billy Singh (1995–2002)
- (Australia) Les Scheinflug (2002)
- (Australia) Tony Buesnel (2003–2004)
- (Australia) Lee Sterrey (2005–2006)
- (Uruguay) Juan Carlos Buzzetti (2006–2009)
- (Fiji) Yogendra Dutt (2009–2010)
- (Argentina) Claudio Canosa (2011)
- (Fiji) Gurjit Singh (2011)
- (Uruguay) Juan Carlos Buzzetti (2011–2015)
- (Australia) Frank Farina (2015–2016)
- (France) Christophe Gamel (2016–2019)
- (Denmark) Flemming Serritslev (2020–2022)
- (Fiji) Marika Rodu (2023)
- (Wales) Robert Sherman (2023–2025)
- (Guadeloupe) Stéphane Auvray (2025–present)

== Players ==
=== Current squad ===
The following 23 players were called up for the 2024 OFC Men's Nations Cup.

Caps and goals updated as of 22 June 2024, after the game against Tahiti.

No.	Pos.	Player	Date of birth (age)	Caps	Goals	Club
1	GK	Aydin Mustahib	28 May 2004 (age 22)	1	0	(New Zealand Football) Manurewa
20	GK	Joji Vuakaca	24 March 2003 (age 23)	0	0	(Fiji Football Association) Labasa
22	GK	Isikeli Sevanaia	11 January 2003 (age 23)	5	0	(Fiji Football Association) Rewa
2	DF	Scott Wara	22 September 1999 (age 27)	5	0	(Fiji Football Association) Bula FC
3	DF	Gabriele Matanisiga	14 June 1995 (age 31)	13	2	(Fiji Football Association) Bula FC
4	DF	Ivan Kumar	17 June 1997 (age 29)	5	0	(Fiji Football Association) Bula FC
16	DF	Antonio Tuivuna	20 March 1995 (age 31)	10	1	(Fiji Football Association) Lautoka
17	DF	Filipe Baravilala	25 November 1994 (age 31)	12	1	(Fiji Football Association) Bula FC
18	DF	Lekima Gonerau	8 December 1989 (age 36)	7	0	(Fiji Football Association) Labasa
21	DF	Sterling Vasconcellos	19 April 2005 (age 21)	9	0	(Fiji Football Association) Bula FC
5	MF	Sitiveni Cavuilagi	26 July 1994 (age 32)	15	0	(Fiji Football Association) Lautoka
6	MF	Thomas Dunn	19 January 2003 (age 23)	9	6	(Fiji Football Association) Bula FC
7	MF	Mohammed Raheem	10 August 2003 (age 23)	4	2	(Fiji Football Association) Ba
8	MF	Setareki Hughes	8 June 1995 (age 31)	41	3	(Fiji Football Association) Bula FC
10	MF	Nabil Begg	17 March 2004 (age 22)	12	4	(Fiji Football Association) Bula FC
11	MF	Brendan McMullen	30 June 2002 (age 24)	5	0	(New Zealand Football) Stop Out
12	MF	Tevita Waranaivalu	16 September 1995 (age 31)	24	2	(Fiji Football Association) Rewa
13	MF	Mosese Nabose	1 July 1998 (age 28)	2	0	(Fiji Football Association) Tailevu Naitasiri
19	MF	Merrill Nand	22 September 2000 (age 26)	6	1	(Fiji Football Association) Suva
9	FW	Roy Krishna	30 August 1987 (age 39)	55	40	(Fiji Football Association) Bula FC
14	FW	Sairusi Nalaubu	14 December 1996 (age 29)	16	7	(Fiji Football Association) Lautoka
15	FW	Etonia Dogalau	24 February 2001 (age 25)	5	3	(Fiji Football Association) Ba
23	FW	Rusiate Matarerega	17 January 1993 (age 33)	18	4	(Fiji Football Association) Nadi

=== Recent call-ups ===
The following players have also been called up to represent Fiji in the last 12 months:

Pos.	Player	Date of birth (age)	Caps	Goals	Club	Latest call-up
Notes: ^{INJ} Withdrew due to injury; ^{PRE} Preliminary squad / standby; ^{RET} Retired from the national team; ^{WD} Withdrew due to non-injury issue

== Player records ==
As of 3 October 2026
Players in bold are still active with Fiji.

=== Most appearances ===
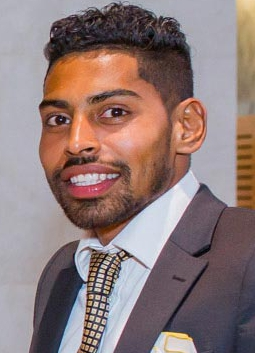
Roy Krishna is Fiji's top goalscorer and their most capped player.

Rank	Name	Caps	Goals	Career
1	**Roy Krishna**	68	47	2007–present
2	**Setareki Hughes** (Note: Hughes also appeared in one match, scoring one goal, against an international 'B' side in the MSG Prime Minister's Cup, however this is not recognised as an official match by FIFA.)	54	3	2016–present
3	Simione Tamanisau	39	0	2003–2019
4	**Dave Radrigai**	37	3	2015–present
4	Remueru Tekiate	37	2	2012–2023
4	Taniela Waqa	37	4	2003–2017
7	Malakai Kainihewe	36	5	2001–2011
8	**Christopher Wasasala** (Note: Also appeared in two matches against international 'B' sides in the MSG Prime Minister's Cup, however these are not recognised as official matches by FIFA.)	35	11	2017–present
9	Esala Masi	34	31	1997–2005
9	**Tevita Waranaivalu**	34	3	2015–present

=== Top goalscorers ===
Rank	Name	Goals	Caps	Ratio	Career
1	**Roy Krishna** (list)	47	68	0.69	2007–present
2	Esala Masi	31	34	0.91	1997–2005
3	Osea Vakatalesau	14	19	0.74	2005–2017
4	**Christopher Wasasala**	11	35	0.31	2017–present
5	Veresa Toma	10	15	0.67	2002–2011
5	**Sairusi Nalaubu** (Note: Also appeared in one match against an international 'B' side in the MSG Prime Minister's Cup, however this is not recognised as an official match by FIFA.)	10	24	0.42	2022–present
7	**Thomas Dunn**	9	22	0.41	2023–present
8	Saula Waqa	8	13	0.62	2017–2022
9	Shalendra Lal	7	8	0.88	1998–2001
9	Maciu Dunadamu	7	15	0.47	2007–2015
9	Malakai Tiwa	7	19	0.37	2007–2016

== Competition record ==
=== FIFA World Cup ===
FIFA World Cup record									Qualification record						
Year	Round	Position	Pld	W	D	L	GF	GA	Pos	Pld	W	D	L	GF	GA
(Uruguay) 1930 to (Chile) 1962	Not member of FIFA								Not member of FIFA						
(England) 1966	Did not enter								Declined participation						
(Mexico) 1970	Did not enter								Declined participation						
(West Germany) 1974	Did not enter								Declined participation						
(Argentina) 1978	Did not enter								Declined participation						
(Spain) 1982	Did not qualify								5th	8	1	3	4	6	35
(Mexico) 1986	Did not enter								Did not enter						
(Italy) 1990	Did not qualify								3rd	2	1	0	1	2	5
(United States) 1994	Did not qualify								2nd	4	2	1	1	6	3
(France) 1998	Did not qualify								2nd	4	2	0	2	4	7
(South Korea) (Japan) 2002	Did not qualify								2nd	4	3	0	1	27	4
(Germany) 2006	Did not qualify								4th	9	4	1	4	22	15
(South Africa) 2010	Did not qualify								3rd	12	6	2	4	36	13
(Brazil) 2014	Did not qualify								3rd	3	0	2	1	1	2
(Russia) 2018	Did not qualify								3rd	7	1	1	5	7	14
(Qatar) 2022	Did not qualify								3rd	3	1	0	2	3	7
(Canada) (Mexico) (United States) 2026	Did not qualify								SF	4	1	2	1	5	11
(Morocco) (Portugal) (Spain) 2030	To be determined								To be determined						
(Saudi Arabia) 2034	To be determined								To be determined						
Total		0/15								60	22	12	26	119	116

=== OFC Nations Cup ===
Oceania Cup / OFC Nations Cup record									Qualification record					
Year	Round	Position	Pld	W	D	L	GF	GA	Pld	W	D	L	GF	GA
(New Zealand) 1973	Group stage	5th	4	0	0	4	2	13	No qualification					
(New Caledonia) 1980	Fourth place	4th	4	2	0	2	11	9	No qualification					
(Pacific Community) 1996	Did not qualify								4	3	0	1	8	4
(Australia) 1998	Third place	3rd	4	2	0	2	8	6	4	3	1	0	8	2
(French Polynesia) 2000	Qualified but withdrew								4	3	1	0	13	4
(New Zealand) 2002	Group stage	5th	3	1	0	2	2	10	Qualified automatically					
(Australia) 2004	Fourth place	4th	5	1	1	3	3	10	4	3	0	1	19	5
(Pacific Community) 2008	Third place	3rd	6	2	1	3	8	11	6	4	1	1	28	2
(Solomon Islands) 2012	Group stage	6th	3	0	2	1	1	2	Qualified automatically					
(Papua New Guinea) 2016	Group stage	6th	3	1	0	2	4	6	Qualified automatically					
(Fiji) (Vanuatu) 2024	Fourth place	4th	5	3	0	2	17	6	Qualified automatically					
Total	Third place	9/11	37	12	4	21	56	73	22	16	3	3	76	17

=== Pacific Games ===
South Pacific Games record
Year	Round	Position	Pld	W	D	L	GF	GA
(Fiji) 1963	Runners-up	2nd	3	2	0	1	10	9
(New Caledonia) 1966	Did not enter							
(Papua New Guinea) 1969	Fourth place	4th	6	2	1	3	12	19
(French Polynesia) 1971	Group stage	5th	3	1	0	2	16	12
(Guam) 1975	Fourth place	4th	4	1	1	2	14	7
(Fiji) 1979	Runners-up	2nd	5	3	1	1	31	3
(Samoa) 1983	Runners-up	2nd	6	5	0	1	26	4
(New Caledonia) 1987	Did not enter							
(Papua New Guinea) 1991	Champions	1st	5	4	1	0	24	3
(French Polynesia) 1995	Third place	3rd	5	3	2	0	19	6
(Fiji) 2003	Champions	1st	6	5	1	0	22	3
(Samoa) 2007	Runners-up	2nd	6	4	1	1	28	2
(New Caledonia) 2011	Fourth place	4th	6	4	0	2	20	5
(Papua New Guinea) 2015	See Fiji national under-23 football team							
(Samoa) 2019	Third place	3rd	6	3	2	1	26	8
(Solomon Islands) 2023	Third place	3rd	4	2	1	1	14	4
Total	2 titles	12/15	60	37	10	13	228	80

=== MSG Prime Minister's Cup ===
MSG Prime Minister's Cup record
Year	Round	Position	Pld	W	D*	L	GF	GA
(Solomon Islands) 1988	Champions	1st	4	3	1	0	14	2
(Fiji) 1989	Champions	1st	4	3	1	0	7	2
(New Caledonia) 1990	Third place	3rd	4	1	3	0	2	1
(Vanuatu) 1992	Champions	1st	3	2	1	0	6	3
(Solomon Islands) 1994	Runners-up	2nd	4	3	0	1	8	4
(Vanuatu) 1998	Champions	1st	4	3	1	0	8	2
(Fiji) 2000	Champions	1st	4	3	1	0	13	4
(Vanuatu) 2022	3rd place	3rd	4	2	1	1	4	3
(New Caledonia) 2023	Did not enter							
(Solomon Islands) 2024	Runners-up	2nd	4	2	2	0	8	3
(Papua New Guinea) 2025
(Fiji) 2026	Champions	1st	5	3	1	1	8	5
Total	11/12	6 Titles	40	25	12	3	78	29

== Head-to-head record ==
Up to matches played on 30 September 2026.

Team	Pld	W	D	L	GF	GA	GD	WPCT
American Samoa	4	4	0	0	39	0	+39	100.00
Australia	9	2	0	7	6	38	−32	22.22
China	1	0	0	1	1	4	−3	0.00
Chinese Taipei	2	1	1	0	2	1	+1	50.00
Cook Islands	4	4	0	0	26	2	+24	100.00
Estonia	1	0	0	1	0	2	−2	0.00
Guam	4	4	0	0	45	1	+44	100.00
Hong Kong	3	0	2	1	2	10	−8	0.00
India	2	2	0	0	3	1	+2	100.00
Indonesia	3	0	3	0	3	3	0	0.00
Kiribati	3	3	0	0	45	0	+45	100.00
Malaysia	5	2	1	2	8	5	+3	40.00
Mauritius	1	1	0	0	1	0	+1	100.00
Mexico	1	0	0	1	0	2	−2	0.00
New Caledonia	41	22	7	12	79	71	+8	53.66
New Zealand	42	5	4	33	26	129	−103	11.90
Northern Mariana Islands	1	1	0	0	10	0	+10	100.00
Papua New Guinea	27	14	8	5	54	29	+25	51.85
Philippines	1	0	0	1	2	3	−1	0.00
Samoa (Note: Includes results as Western Samoa.)	7	7	0	0	40	4	+36	100.00
Singapore	1	0	0	1	0	2	−2	0.00
Solomon Islands	47	22	16	9	82	48	+34	46.81
Tahiti	38	9	9	20	42	67	−25	23.68
Thailand	1	0	0	1	0	3	−3	0.00
Tonga	3	3	0	0	17	1	+16	100.00
Tuvalu	5	5	0	0	47	1	+46	100.00
Vanuatu (Note: Includes results as New Hebrides.)	43	21	8	14	88	51	+37	48.84
Wallis and Futuna	1	1	0	0	5	0	+5	100.00
Total	301	133	59	109	673	478	+195	44.19

Source: 1951–99 results and 2000–present results.

== Best / Worst Results ==
- Fiji national football team results (1951–1999)
- Fiji national football team results (2000–present)

=== Best ===
1. 24–0 vs. Kiribati, 1979
2. 16–0 vs. Tuvalu, 2007
3. 15–1 vs. Cook Islands, 1971
4. 14–1 vs. Guam, 1991
5. 13–0 vs. American Samoa, 2001
6. 12–0 vs. Guam, 1993
7. 12–0 vs. Kiribati, 2003
8. 11–0 vs. Guam, 1975
9. 11–0 vs. American Samoa, 2004
10. 10–0 vs. Solomon Islands, 1983
11. 10–0 vs. Northern Mariana Islands, 2023
12. 10–1 vs. Tuvalu, 2019

=== Worst ===
1. 0–13 vs. New Zealand, 1981
2. 0–11 vs. New Caledonia, 1969
3. 0–10 vs. Australia, 1981
4. 0–9 vs. New Zealand, 1952
5. 0–8 vs. Australia, 2002

== Honours ==
=== Continental ===
- OFC Nations Cup
  - (bronze) Third place (2): 1998, 2008

=== Subcontinental ===
- Pacific Games
  - (gold) Gold medal (2): 1991, 2003
  - (silver) Silver medal (4): 1963, 1979, 1983, 2007
  - (bronze) Bronze medal (3): 1995, 2019, 2023
- Pacific Mini Games
  - (silver) Silver medal (2): 1993, 2017
- Melanesia Cup / MSG Prime Minister's Cup
  - (gold) Champions (6): 1988, 1989, 1992, 1998, 2000, 2026
  - (silver) Runners-up (2): 1994, 2024
  - (bronze) Third place (3): 1990, 2022, 2025

=== Summary ===
Including honours in competitions directly organized/recognized by FIFA or an affiliated confederation.

Competition	1st place, gold medalist(s)	2nd place, silver medalist(s)	3rd place, bronze medalist(s)	Total
OFC Nations Cup	0	0	2	2
Total	0	0	2	2

== Historical kits ==
1961 Home	1979 Home	1983 Home	1983 Away	1988 Home	1998 Away	2000 Home	2000 Away

2004 Home	2004 Away	2007 Away	2012 Home	2016 Home	2016 Away

== See also ==
- Fiji national under-23 football team
- Fiji national under-20 football team
- Fiji national under-17 football team
- Fiji women's national football team
- Fiji women's national under-20 football team
- Fiji women's national under-17 football team
- Fiji national rugby union team
- Fiji national cricket team
