= 1992 Melanesia Cup =

Tournament details
- Host country: Vanuatu
- Dates: 25–30 July
- Teams: 4 (from 1 confederation)
- Venue: 1 (in 1 host city)

Final positions
- Champions: Fiji (3rd title)
- Runners-up: New Caledonia
- Third place: Solomon Islands

Tournament statistics
- Matches played: 6
- Goals scored: 15 (2.5 per match)
- Top scorer(s): (Solomon Islands) Dudley Natei (Fiji) Adrias Aussu (Fiji) Abel Tchaunyane (2 goals each)

The 1992 Melanesia Cup was the fourth international association football championship for national teams from Melanesia. Hosted by Vanuatu, the competition ran from 25–30 July 1992 and was contested by the national teams of Fiji, New Caledonia, the Solomon Islands and Vanuatu.

The round-robin tournament began with the first round of matches on 25 July 1992 and ended with the final round of matches on 30 July 1992.

After both New Caledonia and Fiji won their final matches and finished level on points, Fiji won the competition for the third time on goal difference.

== Background ==
The first edition of the Melanesia Cup took place in the Solomon Islands in 1988. Vanuatu were the defending champions after winning the third edition of the competition in 1990. Fiji were the most successful team in the history of the competition having won both the inaugural edition and the second edition as hosts in 1989.

== Format ==
The tournament was played as a round-robin where each team would play all of the others once. The winner would be decided by the total number of points obtained across all matches played.

=== Participants ===
- Fiji
- New Caledonia
- Solomon Islands
- Vanuatu

== Summary ==
In the opening round of matches on 25 July, Adrias Aussu scored the only goal as New Caledonia defeated Vanuatu and goals from Radike Nawalu and Jo Masilagi saw Fiji come from behind to defeat the Solomon Islands 2–1. Two days later, goals from Johnson Tome, Dudley Natei and Medley Toatu helped the Solomon Islands to a 3–1 win against Vanuatu before, on July 28, Fiji and New Caledonia drew 2–2.

With one round of matches to go, Fiji and New Caledonia were tied on both points and goal difference at the top of the table. The Solomon Islands were a point behind in third. In the final round of matches on July 30, Fiji sealed the title on goal difference after goals from Nawalu and Taitu Bula helped them to a 2–0 win against Vanuatu. Abel Tchaunyane scored the only goal for New Caledonia as they defeated the Solomon Islands but it wasn't enough to prevent Fiji winning a third title.

== Table ==
| Pos | Team | Pld | W | D | L | GF | GA | GD | Pts |
|---|---|---|---|---|---|---|---|---|---|
| 1 | Fiji | 3 | 2 | 1 | 0 | 6 | 3 | +3 | 5 |
| 2 | New Caledonia | 3 | 2 | 1 | 0 | 4 | 2 | +2 | 5 |
| 3 | Solomon Islands | 3 | 1 | 0 | 2 | 4 | 4 | 0 | 2 |
| 4 | Vanuatu | 3 | 0 | 0 | 3 | 1 | 6 | −5 | 0 |

== Matches ==
25 July 1992

| Fiji | 2–1 | Solomon Islands |
|---|---|---|
| Nawalu 36'; Masilagi 45' | | Natei 10' |

Korman Stadium, Port Vila
Referee: Jurgen Baldes (Papua New Guinea)
25 July 1992

| New Caledonia | 1–0 | Vanuatu |
|---|---|---|
| Aussu 88' |

Korman Stadium, Port Vila
Referee: Shaasheen Khan (Fiji)

27 July 1992

| Solomon Islands | 3–1 | Vanuatu |
|---|---|---|
| Tome 16'; Natei 41'; Toatu 74' | | Carlot 44' |

Korman Stadium, Port Vila
Referee: Shaasheen Khan (Fiji)
28 July 1992

| Fiji | 2–2 | New Caledonia |
|---|---|---|
| Watkins 18'; Madigi 66' | | Aussu 38'; Tchauyane 63' |

Korman Stadium, Port Vila
Referee: Kaltaktek Kalogis (Vanuatu)

30 July 1992

| Fiji | 2–0 | Vanuatu |
|---|---|---|
| Nawalu 7'; Bula 21' |

Korman Stadium, Port Vila
Referee: Jurgen Baldes (Papua New Guinea)
30 July 1992

| New Caledonia | 1–0 | Solomon Islands |
|---|---|---|
| Tchauyane 19' |

Korman Stadium, Port Vila
Referee: Kaltaktek Kalogis (Vanuatu)
