= MSG Prime Minister's Cup =

Association football tournament for Melanesian countries

- Organiser(s): Melanesian Spearhead Group
- Founded: 1988 as Melanesia Cup; 2022 as MSG Prime Minister's Cup; 2025 women tournament
- Teams: Between 4 and 6
- Current champions: MEN: Fiji (6th title); WOMEN: Vanuatu (1st title)
- Most championships: MEN: Fiji (6 titles); WOMEN: Papua New Guinea; Vanuatu (1 title)
- 2026 MSG Prime Minister's Cup

The MSG Prime Minister's Cup, formerly known as the Melanesia Cup, is an association football competition played between the Melanesian countries. It was formerly used (along with the Polynesia Cup) for qualification to the OFC Nations Cup. The original tournament used a round-robin format with every team playing each other once at the tournament's location.

== History ==
=== Melanesia Cup (1988–2000) ===
The Melanesia Cup was founded in 1988, with Fiji becoming the inaugural champions following a 3–1 victory against Solomon Islands. The tournament was played on an annual basis until the 1990 tournament saw the Melanesia Cup become a biennial tournament. It was then played every two years until 2000 except for 1996.

The 1996 Melanesia Cup was cancelled for unknown reasons, and the scheduled 2002 Melanesia Cup was cancelled due to security issues in Honiara as the tournament was moved from July to September 2002.

The tournament also served as OFC Nations Cup qualifiers, first doing so in 1994.

=== 2002–2022 ===
In 2008, the Wantok Cup was established as a competition between Papua New Guinea, the Solomon Islands and Vanuatu. It was described by the Oceania Football Confederation as "a tournament reminiscent of the now defunct Melanesian Cup".

This tournament was also abolished, with the last two editions played in 2011.

=== MSG Prime Minister's Cup (2022–present) ===
In 2022 the tournament was revived under the current name, the MSG Prime Minister's Cup, after more than twenty years. The name was changed at the impetus of FIFA. It is organised by the Melanesian Spearhead Group.

The inaugural tournament was won by first-time champions Papua New Guinea in 2022, and the 2022 MSG Prime Minister's Cup also saw the introduction of "B" teams into the tournament.

== Participants ==
- Fiji
- New Caledonia
- Papua New Guinea
- Solomon Islands
- Vanuatu

== Total wins (men's tournament) ==
=== Total ===
6	Fiji	1988, 1989, 1992, 1998, 2000, 2026
2	Papua New Guinea	2022, 2024
2	Solomon Islands	1994, 2023
2	Vanuatu	1990, 2025

=== Melanesia Cup ===
5	Fiji	1988, 1989, 1992, 1998, 2000
1	Solomon Islands	1994
1	Vanuatu	1990

=== MSG Prime Minister's Cup ===
2	Papua New Guinea	2022, 2024
1	Solomon Islands	2023
1	Vanuatu	2025
1	Fiji	2026

== Results Men's ==
Year	Host	Winner	Runner-up	3rd Place	4th Place
Melanesia Cup
1988; Details	Solomon Islands	Fiji	Solomon Islands	Vanuatu	New Caledonia
1989; Details	Fiji	Fiji	New Caledonia	Solomon Islands	Papua New Guinea
1990; Details	New Caledonia	Vanuatu	New Caledonia	Fiji	Solomon Islands
1992; Details	Vanuatu	Fiji	New Caledonia	Solomon Islands	Vanuatu
1994; Details	Solomon Islands	Solomon Islands	Fiji	Papua New Guinea	New Caledonia
1998; Details	Vanuatu	Fiji	Vanuatu	Solomon Islands	Papua New Guinea
2000; Details	Fiji	Fiji	Solomon Islands	Vanuatu	New Caledonia
MSG Prime Minister's Cup
2022; Details	Vanuatu	Papua New Guinea	Vanuatu	Fiji	Solomon Islands
2023; Details	New Caledonia	Solomon Islands	New Caledonia	Vanuatu	Papua New Guinea
2024; Details	Solomon Islands	Papua New Guinea	Fiji	Solomon Islands	Vanuatu
2025; Details	Papua New Guinea	Vanuatu	Papua New Guinea	Fiji and Solomon Islands	
2026; Details	Fiji	Fiji	Vanuatu	Solomon Islands	Papua New Guinea
2027; Details	Vanuatu				

Source: RSSSF

== Results Women's ==
Year	Host	Winner	Runner-up	3rd Place	4th Place
MSG Prime Minister's Cup
2025; Details	Papua New Guinea	Papua New Guinea Gold	Fiji	Vanuatu	Solomon Islands
2026; Details	Fiji	Vanuatu	Papua New Guinea	Solomon Islands	Fiji
2027; Details	Vanuatu				

== See also ==
- Melanesian Super Cup
- Polynesia Cup
- Wantok Cup
