= Tony Buesnel =

Australian soccer coach

Managerial career
- Years: Team
- 1985: Brisbane City FC
- 2003–2004: Fiji
- 2003–2004: Fiji U23

Tony Buesnel is an Australian former football coach who is last known to have managed the Fiji national football team.

== Fiji ==
=== Senior ===
Despite making the second round of the Second Round of the 2004 World Cup qualifying stage, Buesnel's contract to coach Fiji cancelled just 21 months into his stint there. Afterwards, the Australian trainer stated that the development of the players was disrupted because coaches were always sacked prematurely.

=== Under-23 ===
Taking the reins of the Fiji Olympic team for their 2004 Summer Olympics qualifying rounds, Buesnel aimed to beat Australia during the campaign.

Won the 2003 Pacific Games gold medal in charge of the Fiji Olympic team which enraptured the fans.
