= Solomon Islands national football team =

National association football team

Solomon Islands
- Nickname: Bonitos
- Association: Solomon Islands Football Federation (SIFF)
- Confederation: OFC (Oceania)
- Head coach: (England) Ben Cahn (interim)
- Captain: Joses Nawo
- Most caps: Henry Fa'arodo (64)
- Top scorer: Commins Menapi (34)
- Home stadium: National Stadium, Lawson Tama Stadium
- FIFA code: SOL
First colours	Second colours

FIFA ranking
- Current: 152 ▲1 (7 October 2026)
- Highest: 120 (October 2007, April 2008)
- Lowest: 200 (January–March 2016)

First international
- Solomon Islands 6–3 New Hebrides (Suva, Fiji; 30 August 1963)

Biggest win
- Solomon Islands 16–0 Cook Islands (Papeete, Tahiti; 21 August 1995)

Biggest defeat
- Tahiti 18–0 Solomon Islands (Suva, Fiji; 8 December 1963)

OFC Nations Cup
- Appearances: 8 (first in 1980)
- Best result: Runners-up (2004)

Melanesia Cup / MSG Prime Minister's Cup
- Appearances: 11 (first in 1988)
- Best result: Melanesia Cup: Champions (1994); MSG Prime Minister's Cup: Champions (2023)

The Solomon Islands men's national football team is the national association football team of the Solomon Islands, administered by the Solomon Islands Football Federation. The Solomon Islands national football team was founded in 1978. They were officially recognised by FIFA a decade later, in 1988.

== History ==
During the 2004 Oceania World Cup qualification/Oceania Cup the team drew 2–2 with Australia and qualified for the second leg. In the second leg, the Solomon Islands national men's team were thrashed by Australia 5–1 and 6–0 in the two matches, with Australia qualifying for the 2005 FIFA Confederations Cup.

The Solomons got a second chance against the Socceroos in a two-legged series in September 2005, this time with the winner advancing to a two-legged series against CONMEBOL's fifth-place finisher for a berth in the 2006 FIFA World Cup, and the team was thrashed by Australia 7–0 on the first leg and 2–1 in the second played at home.

The Solomons were knocked out of the 2010 FIFA World Cup – having got off to a good start winning every game in their qualifying group and comfortably progressing to the knockout rounds, defeats to New Caledonia and then to Vanuatu saw them knocked out of the competition.

In 2012, the Solomon Islands held the 2012 OFC Nations Cup which was also the second round of World Cup qualifying for the 2014 FIFA World Cup where they finished in fourth place after qualifying through to the knockout stage by defeating Papua New Guinea and having draws against Fiji and New Zealand. They lost in the semi-final after they lost to the champions Tahiti after Jonathan Tehau scored the only goal. They later lost to New Zealand in the third-place playoff. The third round of World Cup qualifying saw the team finish bottom of the group after only taking one win against Tahiti.

After first taking charge of the team in 2017, Spaniard Felipe Vega-Arango was appointed for his second stint in June 2021.

In 2019, they went on a three-week training tour in Netherlands.

In June 2023, Solomon Islands played their friendly match against Southeast Asia countries, Singapore and Malaysia. Solomon Island won the 2023 MSG Prime Minister's Cup after winning against Papua New Guinea (3–1), Vanuatu (1–0) and New Caledonia (1–0) as Raphael Lea'i clinched the golden boot as the tournament top scorer with four goals.

== Team image ==
=== Kit sponsorship ===
Kit lier	Period
(Italy) Lotto	2004–2013
(New Zealand) Bocini	2014
(N/A) OFC	2015
None	2016
(Australia) Veto	2017
(China) UCAN	2019–2022
(China) SUNAIS	2022–2024
(Australia) Veto	2024–2026
(Australia) KPI	2026–

=== Sponsors ===
- (Australia) KPI
- (Malaysia) Telekom
- (Malaysia) Capo Apparel

== Results and fixtures ==
The following is a list of match results in the last 12 months, as well as any future matches that have been scheduled.

Win Draw Loss Fixture

=== 2025 ===
13 November 2025 MSG Prime Minister's Cup	Papua New Guinea	1–0	Solomon Islands	Port Moresby, Papua New Guinea
16:00 UTC+10	P. Paul 75'	Report		Stadium: PNG Football Stadium

20 November 2025 MSG Prime Minister's Cup semi-final	Vanuatu	2–1	Solomon Islands	Port Moresby, Papua New Guinea
19:00 UTC+10	Andrew 32'; Loloa 40'	Report	Supa 44'	Stadium: PNG Football Stadium

22 November 2025 MSG Prime Minister's Cup third place match	Fiji	1–1; Abandoned	Solomon Islands	Port Moresby, Papua New Guinea
17:00 UTC+10	Wasasala 22' (pen.)	Report	Boyers 35' (pen.)	Stadium: PNG Football Stadium

=== 2026 ===
27 March 2026 FIFA Series	Solomon Islands	2–10	Bulgaria	Jakarta, Indonesia
15:30 UTC+7	Lea'i 29' (pen.), 70'	Report	Petkov 5', 45+2'; Yordanov 13' (pen.); Krastev 39', 44'; Nikolov 53', 81', 90+3'; Rusev 63' (pen.); Balov 65'	Stadium: Gelora Bung Karno Stadium; Attendance: 2,248; Referee: Naufal Adya Fairuski (Indonesia)

30 March 2026 FIFA Series	Saint Kitts and Nevis	4–2	Solomon Islands	Jakarta, Indonesia
16:45 UTC+7	Sterling-James 30'; Mango 43' (o.g.); Kelly 75'; Panayiotou 87'	Report	Keana 36'; Fordney 85'	Stadium: Gelora Bung Karno Stadium; Referee: Thoriq Alkatiri (Indonesia)
Note: The kickoff of the Saint Kitts & Nevis v Solomon Islands match, originally scheduled for 15:30 local time, was delayed for 75 minutes due to a thunderstorm and unfavorable weather conditions.)

18 September 2026 MSG Prime Minister's Cup	Fiji	3–3	Solomon Islands	Suva, Fiji
	Roy Krishna 27' Maikah Dau 42' Thomas Dunn 54' Tevita Waranivalu (red card)	Report	Rooney Riugaemai 41' (pen.) Jayroll Patti 82' Javin Wae 90+10'	Stadium: HFC Bank Stadium

21 September 2026 MSG Prime Minister's Cup	New Caledonia	0–2	Solomon Islands	Suva, Fiji
			Rafa Le’ai 76' Javin Wae 90+3'	Stadium: HFC Bank Stadium

24 September 2026 MSG Prime Minister's Cup	Solomon Islands	v	Vanuatu	Suva, Fiji
				Stadium: HFC Bank Stadium

30 September 2026 MSG Prime Minister's Cup	Papua New Guinea	v	Solomon Islands	Suva, Fiji
				Stadium: HFC Bank Stadium

== Coaching staff ==
Position	Name
Head coach	(England) Ben Cahn (interim)
Assistant coach	(Australia) Richard Greer
Assistant coach	(Wales) Kevin A'Herne Evans
Goalkeeper coach	(Solomon Islands) Tibon Oge
Kit Manager	(Solomon Islands) Augustine Hou
Team Manager	(Solomon Islands) Dixion Lauia Anga

=== Coaching history ===
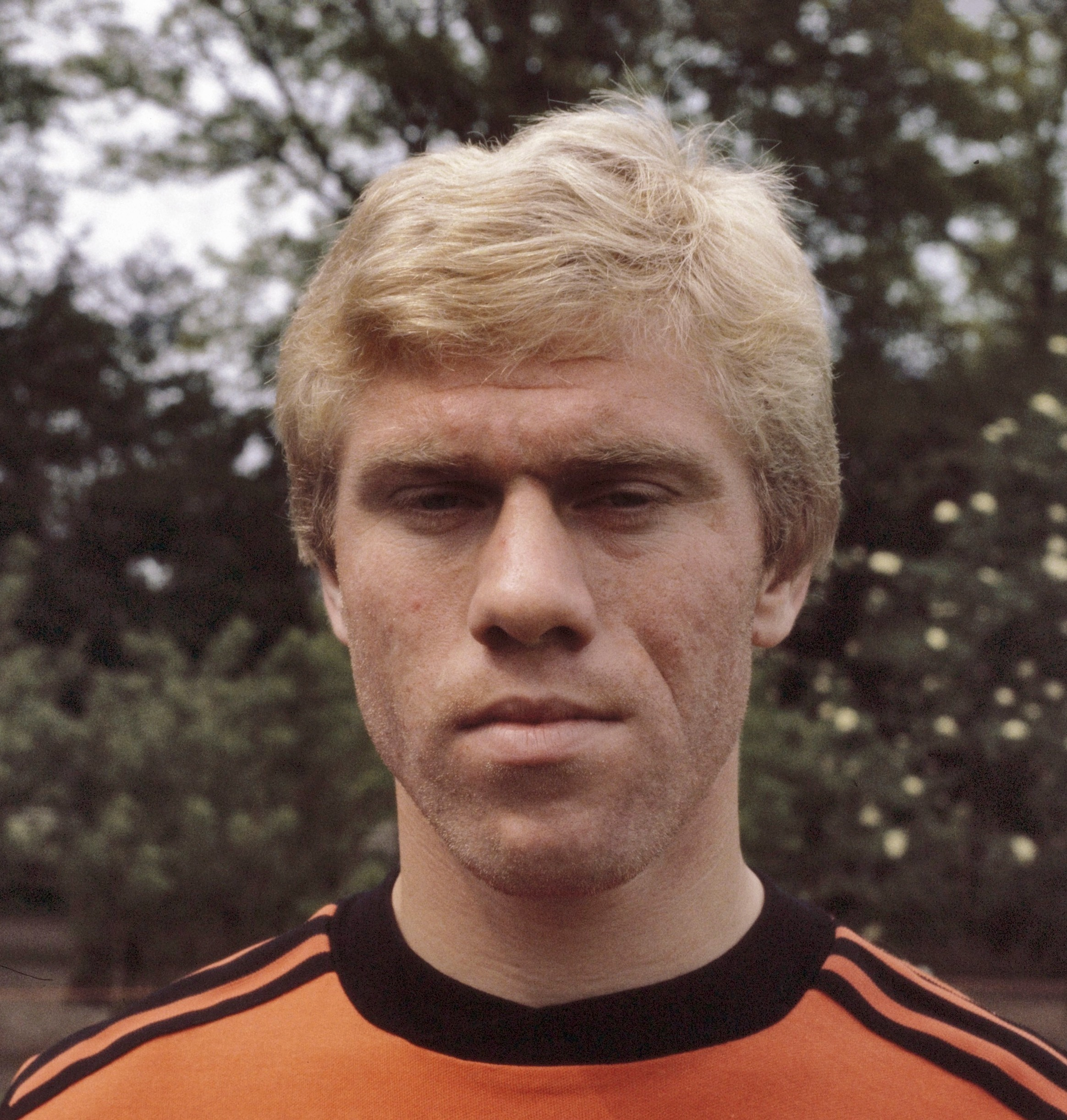
Wim Rijsbergen became the manager of the Solomon Islands in 2019

Caretaker managers are listed in italics.

- (Solomon Islands) Edward Ngara (1995–1996)
- (Solomon Islands) Wilson Maelaua (1996)
- (Scotland) George Cowie (2000–2003)
- (England) Alan Gillett (2004–2005)
- (Brazil) Airton Andrioli (2005–2009)
- (Solomon Islands) Jacob Moli (2010–2014)
- (Solomon Islands) Moses Toata (2015–2016)
- (Spain) Felipe Vega-Arango (2017–2018)
- (Solomon Islands) Moses Toata (2018–2019)
- (Netherlands) Wim Rijsbergen (2019)
- (Solomon Islands) Stanley Waita (2020–2021)
- (Spain) Felipe Vega-Arango (2021–2024)
- (Solomon Islands) Eddie Marahare (2024)
- (Solomon Islands) Jacob Moli (2024)
- (Solomon Islands) Moses Toata (2024)
- (Australia) Josh Smith (2024–2026)
- (England) Ben Cahn (interim) (2026-)

== Players ==
=== Current squad ===
The following players were called up for the 2026 MSG Prime Minister's Cup.

Caps and goals correct as of 30 September 2026, after the match against New Caledonia.

No.	Pos.	Player	Date of birth (age)	Caps	Goals	Club
1	GK	Philip Mango	28 August 1995 (aged 31)	44	0	(Solomon Islands Football Federation) Kossa
12	GK	Junior Petua	30 December 2003 (aged 22)	0	0	(Solomon Islands Football Federation) Marist
23	GK	Michael Laulae	20 May 2002 (aged 24)	4	0	(Vanuatu Football Federation) ABM Galaxy
2	DF	David Supa	21 December 2000 (aged 25)	19	0	(Fiji Football Association) Ba
4	DF	Gordon Iro	2 December 2005 (aged 20)	2	0	(Solomon Islands Football Federation) Green Shield
5	DF	Javin Wae	17 November 2002 (aged 23)	22	2	(Solomon Islands Football Federation) Central Coast
8	DF	Clivert Sam	1 August 2004 (aged 22)	2	0	(Solomon Islands Football Federation) Green Shield
14	DF	Junior David	22 September 2001 (aged 24)	2	0	(Solomon Islands Football Federation) Central Coast
21	DF	Calvin Ohasio	5 April 2000 (aged 26)	10	0	(Solomon Islands Football Federation) Malaita Kingz
6	MF	Atkin Kaua	4 April 1996 (aged 30)	45	5	(Solomon Islands Football Federation) Malaita Kingz
10	MF	Rovu Boyers	19 April 2003 (aged 23)	12	4	(New Zealand Football) Christchurch United
13	MF	Danford Fiumae	29 May 2007 (aged 19)	0	0	(Solomon Islands Football Federation) Green Shield
15	MF	William Komasi	10 June 2000 (aged 26)	24	1	(Fiji Football Association) Navua
17	MF	Don Keana	9 September 2000 (aged 26)	10	1	(Fiji Football Association) Rewa
7	FW	Raphael Lea'i	9 September 2003 (aged 23)	32	14	(Solomon Islands Football Federation) Central Coast
9	FW	Bobby Leslie	3 March 2000 (aged 26)	15	2	(Solomon Islands Football Federation) Central Coast
16	FW	Jayroll Patty	5 June 2007 (aged 19)	1	0	(Solomon Islands Football Federation) Green Shield
18	FW	Ali Mekawir	27 July 2000 (aged 26)	6	0	(Fiji Football Association) Navua
19	FW	Junior Fordney	26 November 1999 (aged 26)	7	1	(Solomon Islands Football Federation) Central Coast
20	FW	Rooney Riugaemai	2004	0	0	(Solomon Islands Football Federation) Green Shield

=== Recent call-ups ===
The following players have also been called up within the last twelve months.

Pos.	Player	Date of birth (age)	Caps	Goals	Club	Latest call-up

== Player records ==
As of 30 September 2026
Players in bold are still active with Solomon Islands.

=== Most appearances ===
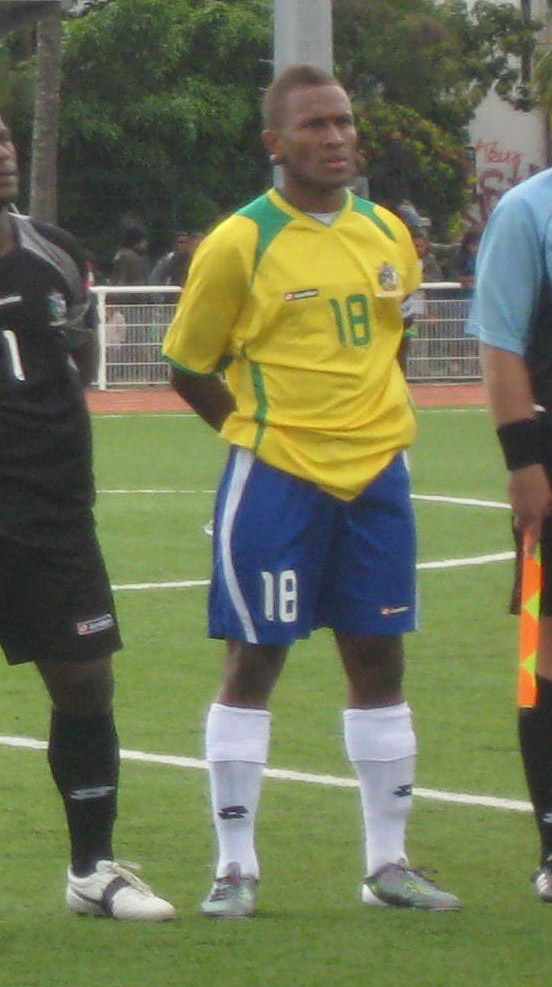
Henry Fa'arodo is the Solomon Islands' most-capped player with 64 appearances.

Rank	Name	Caps	Goals	Career
1	Henry Fa'arodo	64	20	2002–2017
2	**Joses Nawo** (Note: Also appeared in one match against an international 'B' side in the MSG Prime Minister's Cup, however this is not recognised as an official match by FIFA.)	55	8	2011–present
3	Benjamin Totori	52	29	2007–2019
4	**Atkin Kaua** (Note: Also appeared in two matches against international 'B' sides in the MSG Prime Minister's Cup, however these are not recognised as official matches by FIFA.)	49	6	2016–present
5	**Hadisi Aengari**	44	0	2011–present
5	**Philip Mango**	45	0	2016–present
7	Nelson Sale Kilifa	37	0	2004–2017
7	Batram Suri	37	15	1992–2005
9	Commins Menapi	36	34	2000–2007
10	**Raphael Lea'i**	36	17	2022–present
11	**Gagame Feni**	35	19	2012–present

=== Top goalscorers ===
Rank	Name	Goals	Caps	Ratio	Career
1	Commins Menapi	34	36	0.94	2000–2007
2	Benjamin Totori	29	52	0.56	2007–2019
3	Henry Fa'arodo	20	64	0.31	2002–2017
4	**Gagame Feni**	19	35	0.54	2012–present
5	**Raphael Lea'i** (Note: Lea'i also appeared in two matches, scoring one goal, against international 'B' sides in the MSG Prime Minister's Cup, however these are not recognised as official matches by FIFA.)	17	36	0.47	2022–present
6	Batram Suri	15	37	0.41	1992–2005
7	Noel Berry	10	15	0.67	1995–2000
8	**Micah Lea'alafa**	9	31	0.29	2016–present
9	**John Orobulu**	8	16	0.5	2018–present
9	**Joses Nawo**	8	55	0.15	2011–present

== Competitive record ==
=== FIFA World Cup ===
FIFA World Cup record									Qualification record						
Year	Round	Position	Pld	W	D*	L	GF	GA	Pos.	Pld	W	D	L	GF	GA
(Uruguay) 1930	Not member of FIFA								Not member of FIFA						
(Italy) 1934	Not member of FIFA								Not member of FIFA						
(France) 1938	Not member of FIFA								Not member of FIFA						
(Brazil) 1950	Not member of FIFA								Not member of FIFA						
(Switzerland) 1954	Not member of FIFA								Not member of FIFA						
(Sweden) 1958	Not member of FIFA								Not member of FIFA						
(Chile) 1962	Not member of FIFA								Not member of FIFA						
(England) 1966	Not member of FIFA								Not member of FIFA						
(Mexico) 1970	Not member of FIFA								Not member of FIFA						
(West Germany) 1974	Not member of FIFA								Not member of FIFA						
(Argentina) 1978	Not member of FIFA								Not member of FIFA						
(Spain) 1982	Not member of FIFA								Not member of FIFA						
(Mexico) 1986	Not member of FIFA								Not member of FIFA						
(Italy) 1990	Did not enter								Did not enter						
(United States) 1994	Did not qualify								1st Round	4	0	1	3	5	13
(France) 1998	Did not qualify								2nd Round	8	3	3	2	22	23
(South Korea) (Japan) 2002	Did not qualify								1st Round	4	2	0	2	17	10
(Germany) 2006	Did not qualify								2nd	11	6	2	3	24	16
(South Africa) 2010	Did not qualify								SF	6	4	0	2	23	6
(Brazil) 2014	Did not qualify								4th	9	2	2	5	7	22
(Russia) 2018	Did not qualify								2nd	9	4	1	4	10	16
(Qatar) 2022	Did not qualify								2nd	3	2	0	1	6	8
(Canada) (Mexico) (United States) 2026	Did not qualify								2nd Round	3	1	0	2	4	5
(Morocco) (Portugal) (Spain) 2030	To be determined								To be determined						
(Saudi Arabia) 2034	To be determined								To be determined						
Total	—	0/23	–	–	–	–	–	–	—	60	24	9	27	122	126

=== OFC Nations Cup ===
Oceania Cup / OFC Nations Cup record										Qualification record					
Year	Round	Position	Pld	W	D	L	GF	GA	Squad	Pld	W	D	L	GF	GA
(New Zealand) 1973	Did not enter									Did not enter					
(New Caledonia) 1980	Group stage	8th	3	0	0	3	3	21	—N/a	No qualification					
(Pacific Community) 1996	Semi-finals	3rd	2	0	0	2	1	3	Squad	4	4	0	0	10	1
(Australia) 1998	Did not qualify									4	2	1	1	8	7
(French Polynesia) 2000	Third place	3rd	4	2	0	2	7	10	Squad	4	2	1	1	10	9
(New Zealand) 2002	Group stage	6th	3	0	1	2	3	9	Squad	Qualified automatically					
(Australia) 2004	Runners-up	2nd	7	3	1	3	10	17	Squad	4	3	1	0	14	1
(Pacific Community) 2008	Did not qualify									6	4	0	2	23	6
(Solomon Islands) 2012	Fourth place	4th	5	1	2	2	5	6	Squad	Qualified automatically					
(Papua New Guinea) 2016	Semi-finals	3rd	4	1	0	3	2	4	Squad	Qualified automatically					
(Fiji) (Vanuatu) 2024	Group stage	6th	2	0	0	2	0	4	Squad	Qualified automatically					
Total	Runners-up	8/11	30	7	4	19	31	74	—	22	15	3	4	65	24

=== Pacific Games ===
Pacific Games record
Year	Round	Position	Pld	W	D	L	GF	GA
(Fiji) 1963	Fourth place	4th	3	1	0	2	6	26
(New Caledonia) 1966	Group stage	6th	2	0	1	1	4	12
(Papua New Guinea) 1969	Sixth place	6th	5	0	1	4	8	19
(French Polynesia) 1971	did not enter							
(Guam) 1975	Bronze medal	3rd	4	2	1	1	9	8
(Fiji) 1979	Bronze medal	3rd	5	4	0	1	24	5
(Samoa) 1983	Group stage	10th	3	1	0	2	0	11
(New Caledonia) 1987	did not enter							
(Papua New Guinea) 1991	Silver medal	2nd	5	4	1	0	12	3
(French Polynesia) 1995	Silver medal	2nd	6	4	0	2	34	10
(Fiji) 2003	Group stage	5th	4	2	1	1	14	4
(Samoa) 2007	Fourth place	4th	6	4	0	2	23	6
(New Caledonia) 2011	Silver medal	2nd	7	5	0	2	21	6
(Papua New Guinea) 2015	See Solomon Islands national under-23 football team							
(Samoa) 2019	Group stage	7th	5	2	1	2	30	9
(Solomon Islands) 2023	Silver medal	2nd	5	2	1	2	30	9
Total	Runners-up	12/15	55	29	6	20	185	119

=== Wantok Cup ===
- 2008 (July, 1st edition) – First place

== Head-to-head record ==
Updated 30 September 2026 after the match against Papua New Guinea

Team	Pld	W	D	L	GF	GA	GD	WPCT
American Samoa	4	4	0	0	40	1	+39	100.00
Australia	10	0	1	9	8	55	−47	0.00
Bulgaria	1	0	0	1	2	10	−8	0.00
Chinese Taipei	1	1	0	0	1	0	+1	100.00
Cook Islands	5	5	0	0	37	2	+35	100.00
Fiji	45	8	17	20	50	82	−32	17.78
Guam	3	3	0	0	24	2	+22	100.00
Hong Kong	1	0	0	1	0	3	−3	0.00
Kiribati	1	1	0	0	7	0	+7	100.00
Macau	1	1	0	0	4	1	+3	100.00
Malaysia	1	0	0	1	1	4	−3	0.00
New Caledonia	30	12	3	15	37	59	−22	40.00
New Zealand	14	0	2	12	11	52	−41	0.00
Papua New Guinea	27	15	5	7	45	35	+10	55.56
Saint Kitts and Nevis	1	0	0	1	2	4	−2	0.00
Samoa (Note: Includes results as Western Samoa.)	4	4	0	0	21	0	+21	100.00
Singapore	2	0	1	1	4	5	−1	0.00
Tahiti	24	5	3	16	26	76	−50	20.83
Tonga	5	5	0	0	31	0	+31	100.00
Tuvalu	4	4	0	0	29	1	+28	100.00
Vanuatu (Note: Includes results as New Hebrides.)	38	23	8	7	85	43	+42	60.53
Wallis and Futuna	3	3	0	0	23	1	+22	100.00
Total	225	94	40	91	488	436	+52	41.78

Source: 1963–99 results and 2000–present results

== Honours ==
=== Continental ===
- OFC Nations Cup
  - (silver) Runners-up (1): 2004
  - (bronze) Third place (1): 2000

=== Subcontinental ===
- Pacific Games
  - (silver) Silver medal (4): 1991, 1995, 2011, 2023
  - (bronze) Bronze medal (2): 1975, 1979
- Pacific Mini Games
  - (bronze) Bronze medal (1): 2017
- Melanesia Cup / MSG Prime Minister's Cup
  - (gold) Champions (2): 1994, 2023
  - (silver) Runners-up (2): 1988, 2000
  - (bronze) Third place (6): 1989, 1992, 1998, 2024, 2025, 2026

=== Friendly ===
- Wantok Cup
  - (gold) Champions (1): 2011–I
  - (silver) Runners-up (1): 2011–II
  - (bronze) Third place (1): 2008

=== Summary ===
Including honours in competitions directly organized/recognized by FIFA or an affiliated confederation.

Competition	1st place, gold medalist(s)	2nd place, silver medalist(s)	3rd place, bronze medalist(s)	Total
OFC Nations Cup	0	1	1	2
Total	0	1	1	2
