= 1998 Melanesia Cup =

Tournament details
- Host country: Vanuatu
- Dates: 5–12 September
- Teams: 5 (from 1 confederation)

Final positions
- Champions: Fiji (4th title)
- Runners-up: Vanuatu
- Third place: Solomon Islands

Tournament statistics
- Matches played: 10
- Goals scored: 31 (3.1 per match)

The Melanesia Cup 1998 was the sixth Melanesia-wide football tournament ever held. It took place in Santo, Vanuatu and five teams participated: Fiji, Solomon Islands, New Caledonia, Papua New Guinea and Vanuatu and served for the second time as OFC Nations Cup qualifier.

The teams played each other according to a round-robin format with Fiji winning the tournament for the third time and qualifying to the 1998 OFC Nations Cup along with Vanuatu.

== Results ==
Pos	Team	Pld	W	D	L	GF	GA	GD	Pts	Qualification
1	Fiji (C)	4	3	1	0	8	2	+6	10	Qualify for 1998 OFC Nations Cup
2	Vanuatu (H)	4	2	1	1	8	6	+2	7	Qualify for 1998 OFC Nations Cup
3	Solomon Islands	4	2	1	1	8	7	+1	7	
4	Papua New Guinea	4	1	1	2	3	6	−3	4	
5	New Caledonia	4	0	0	4	4	10	−6	0	

(C) Champions; (H) Hosts
5 September 1998

Fiji	3–0	New Caledonia

Santo, Vanuatu
5 September 1998

Papua New Guinea	1–3	Solomon Islands

Santo, Vanuatu

7 September 1998

Fiji	2–1	Vanuatu

Santo, Vanuatu
7 September 1998

Papua New Guinea	1–0	New Caledonia

Santo, Vanuatu

8 September 1998

Vanuatu	1–1	Papua New Guinea

Santo, Vanuatu
8 September 1998

Solomon Islands	3–2	New Caledonia

Santo, Vanuatu

10 September 1998

Vanuatu	3–1	Solomon Islands

Santo, Vanuatu
10 September 1998

Fiji	2–0	Papua New Guinea

Santo, Vanuatu

12 September 1998

New Caledonia	2–3	Vanuatu

Santo, Vanuatu
12 September 1998

Fiji	1–1	Solomon Islands

Santo, Vanuatu

Fiji and Vanuatu qualified for Oceania Nations Cup 1998
