= 1989 Melanesia Cup =

Tournament details
- Host country: Fiji
- Dates: 28 October – 4 November
- Teams: 5 (from 1 confederation)

Final positions
- Champions: Fiji (2nd title)
- Runners-up: New Caledonia
- Third place: Solomon Islands

Tournament statistics
- Matches played: 10
- Goals scored: 25 (2.5 per match)

The 1989 Melanesia Cup was the second international association football championship for national teams from Melanesia. Hosted by Fiji, the competition ran from 28 October – 4 November 1989 and was contested by the national teams of Fiji, New Caledonia, Papua New Guinea, the Solomon Islands and Vanuatu.

The round-robin tournament began with the first round of matches on 28 October 1989 and ended with the final round of matches on 4 November 1989.

Defending champions Fiji successfully retained their title after securing a goalless draw with the Solomon Islands in their final match of the tournament.

== Background ==
The first edition of the Melanesia Cup took place in the Solomon Islands in 1988. The competition was won by Fiji who defeated hosts the Solomon Islands 3–1 in the final.

== Format ==
The tournament was played as a round-robin where each team would play all of the others once. The winner would be decided by the total number of points obtained across all matches played.

=== Participants ===
- Fiji
- New Caledonia
- Papua New Guinea
- Solomon Islands
- Vanuatu

== Summary ==
In the opening round of matches on 28 October, the Solomon Islands defeated Vanuatu 2–0 and Fiji won 2–1 against Papua New Guinea. Two days later, New Caledonia defeated the Solomon Islands 2–0 in their first match and Fiji won 2–1 against Vanuatu. The following day, Fiji and Papua New Guinea both recorded 3–0 wins against New Caledonia and Vanuatu respectively. With more than half the matches played, Fiji were top of the standings with six points and only required a point from their final match to win the competition. New Caledonia, Papua New Guinea and the Solomon Islands all had two points while Vanuatu had no points from their three matches.

On 3 November, New Caledonia won 5–1 against Vanuatu while the Solomon Islands and Papua New Guinea played out a goalless draw. The following day, Fiji earned the point they needed to seal the title by drawing 0–0 with the Solomon Islands while New Caledonia defeated Papua New Guinea 2–1 to finish as runners-up.

== Table ==
Pos	Team	Pld	W	D	L	GF	GA	GD	Pts
1	Fiji	4	3	1	0	7	2	+5	7
2	New Caledonia	4	3	0	1	9	5	+4	6
3	Solomon Islands	4	1	2	1	2	2	0	4
4	Papua New Guinea	4	1	1	2	5	4	+1	3
5	Vanuatu	4	0	0	4	2	12	−10	0

== Matches ==
28 October 1989

Vanuatu	0–2	Solomon Islands

28 October 1989

Fiji	2–1	Papua New Guinea

30 October 1989

Solomon Islands	0–2	New Caledonia

30 October 1989

Fiji	2–1	Vanuatu

31 October 1989

New Caledonia	0–3	Fiji

31 October 1989

Papua New Guinea	3–0	Vanuatu

3 November 1989

Vanuatu	1-5	New Caledonia

3 November 1989

Solomon Islands	0–0	Papua New Guinea

4 November 1989

Solomon Islands	0–0	Fiji

4 November 1989

New Caledonia	2–1	Papua New Guinea
