= 1988 Melanesia Cup =

Tournament details
- Host country: Solomon Islands
- Dates: 21–26 October
- Teams: 4 (from 1 confederation)

Final positions
- Champions: Fiji (1st title)
- Runners-up: Solomon Islands
- Third place: Vanuatu

Tournament statistics
- Matches played: 8
- Goals scored: 30 (3.75 per match)

The 1988 Melanesia Cup was the inaugural international association football championship for national teams from Melanesia. Hosted by the Solomon Islands, the competition ran from 20–30 August 1988 and was contested by the national teams of Fiji, New Caledonia, the Solomon Islands and Vanuatu.

The tournament began with the first matches of the group stage on 20 August 1988 and ended with the final on 30 August 1988.

In the final, Fiji defeated hosts the Solomon Islands 3–1 to win the inaugural title. Vanuatu defeated New Caledonia 1–0 in the third-place play-off.

== Background ==
As a new tournament, the Melanesia Cup was launched in 1988 and the Solomon Islands were selected as the hosts.

== Format ==
The tournament was played as a round-robin where each team would play all of the others once before two play-off matches. The two teams with the best record from the round-robin would contest the final, the other two would contest the third-place play-off.

=== Participants ===
- Fiji
- New Caledonia
- Solomon Islands
- Vanuatu

== Summary ==
In the opening match on 21 October, Fiji and the Solomon Islands drew 1–1. Two days later, New Caledonia defeated Vanuatu 6–1. On 24 October, the Solomon Islands defeated New Caledonia 1–0 and Fiji won 8–0 against Vanuatu. With one round of matches in the round-robin left, Fiji and the Solomon Islands were tied on three points and New Caledonia had two points. Vanuatu would contest the third-place play-off with no points from two matches. Two days later, Fiji and the Solomon Islands qualified for the final by defeating New Caledonia 2–0 and Vanuatu 5–0 respectively.

The final matches were held on 26 October. Vanuatu defeated New Caledonia 1–0 in the third-place play-off and Fiji 3–1 against the Solomon Islands in the final.

== Group stage ==
Pos	Team	Pld	W	D	L	GF	GA	GD	Pts	Qualification
1	Fiji	3	2	1	0	11	1	+10	5	Qualification for the final
2	Solomon Islands	3	2	1	0	7	1	+6	5	Qualification for the final
3	New Caledonia	3	1	0	2	6	4	+2	2	Qualification for the third-place play-off
4	Vanuatu	3	0	0	3	1	19	−18	0	Qualification for the third-place play-off

=== Matches ===
21 October 1988

Fiji	1–1	Solomon Islands

23 October 1988

New Caledonia	6–1	Vanuatu

24 October 1988

New Caledonia	0–1	Solomon Islands

24 October 1988

Fiji	8–0	Vanuatu

25 October 1988

Vanuatu	0–5	Solomon Islands

25 October 1988

Fiji	2–0	New Caledonia

== Third-place play-off ==
26 October 1988

Vanuatu	1–0	New Caledonia

== Final ==
26 October 1988

Solomon Islands	1–3	Fiji
