= Tahiti national football team records and statistics =

This page details the Tahiti national football team records and statistics; the most capped players, the players with the most goals and Tahiti's match record by opponent.

== Individual records ==
=== Player records ===
==== Most capped players ====
Rank	Player	Caps	Goals	Career
1	Teaonui Tehau	44	30	2011–present
2	Angelo Tchen	34	1	2001–2018
3	Heimano Bourebare	30	1	2011–present
4	Steevy Chong Hue	28	8	2010–2016
4	Xavier Samin	28	0	2001–2013
6	Alvin Tehau	26	9	2010–present
7	Jonathan Tehau	25	5	2011–2017
7	Vincent Simon	25	1	2004–2016
9	Felix Tagawa	22	14	2000–2004
10	Stanley Atani	21	5	2010–2019

==== Top goalscorers ====
Rank	Player	Goals	Caps	Ratio	Career
1	Teaonui Tehau	30	44	0.68	2011–present
2	Felix Tagawa	14	22	0.64	2000–2004
3	Naea Bennett	12	16	0.75	1996–2010
4	Alvin Tehau	9	26	0.35	2010–present
5	Steevy Chong Hue	8	28	0.29	2010–2016
6	Lorenzo Tehau	7	20	0.35	2010–present
7	Tamatoa Tetauira	5	11	0.45	2016–present
7	Hiro Poroiae	5	12	0.42	2007–2013
7	Stanley Atani	5	21	0.24	2010–2019
7	Jonathan Tehau	5	25	0.2	2011–2017

== Competition records ==
=== FIFA World Cup ===
FIFA World Cup record									Qualification record					
Year	Result	Position	Pld	W	D	L	GF	GA	Pld	W	D	L	GF	GA
1930 to 1954	Did not exist								Did not exist					
1958 to 1990	Did not enter								Did not enter					
(United States) 1994	Did not qualify								4	1	1	2	5	8
(France) 1998	Did not qualify								4	0	1	3	2	12
(South Korea) (Japan) 2002	Did not qualify								4	3	0	1	14	6
(Germany) 2006	Did not qualify								9	3	2	4	7	25
(South Africa) 2010	Did not qualify								4	1	1	2	2	6
(Brazil) 2014	Did not qualify								11	6	0	5	22	17
(Russia) 2018	Did not qualify								7	3	2	2	14	7
(Qatar) 2022	Did not qualify								2	0	0	2	1	4
(Canada) (Mexico) (United States) 2026	To be determined								To be determined					
Total		0/22							45	17	7	21	67	85

=== FIFA Confederations Cup ===
FIFA Confederations Cup record
Year	Round	Position	Pld	W	D	L	GF	GA
1992 to 1995	No OFC representative invited							
1997 to 2009	Did not qualify							
(Brazil) 2013	Group stage	8th	3	0	0	3	1	24
(Russia) 2017	Did not qualify							
Total	Group stage	1/10	3	0	0	3	1	24

=== OFC Nations Cup ===
Oceania Cup / OFC Nations Cup record
Year	Round	Position	Pld	W	D	L	GF	GA
(New Zealand) 1973	Runners-up	2nd	5	2	2	1	7	4
(New Caledonia) 1980	Runners-up	2nd	4	3	0	1	23	9
1996	Runners-up	2nd	4	2	0	2	3	12
(Australia) 1998	Fourth place	4th	4	1	0	3	8	10
(French Polynesia) 2000	Group stage	5th	2	0	0	2	2	5
(New Zealand) 2002	Third place	3rd	5	3	0	2	8	9
(Australia) 2004	Group stage	5th	5	1	1	3	2	24
2008	Did not qualify							
(Solomon Islands) 2012	Champions	1st	5	5	0	0	20	5
(Papua New Guinea) 2016	Group stage	5th	3	1	2	0	7	3
(New Zealand) 2020	Cancelled							
(Fiji) (Vanuatu) 2024	Third place	3rd	5	2	1	2	5	8
Total	1 Title	10/11	42	20	6	16	85	89

=== Pacific Games ===
Pacific Games record
Year	Round	Position	Pld	W	D*	L	GF	GA
(Fiji) 1963	Third place	3rd	2	1	0	1	19	2
(New Caledonia) 1966	Champions	1st	4	4	0	0	14	3
(Papua New Guinea) 1969	Runners-up	2nd	5	3	1	1	19	7
(French Polynesia) 1971	Third place	3rd	4	2	1	1	41	5
(Guam) 1975	Champions	1st	5	4	0	1	12	6
(Fiji) 1979	Champions	1st	5	5	0	0	33	2
(Samoa) 1983	Champions	1st	5	5	0	0	25	2
(New Caledonia) 1987	Runners-up	2nd	5	3	1	1	9	4
(Papua New Guinea) 1991	Group stage	6th	3	1	0	2	15	5
(French Polynesia) 1995	Champions	1st	6	6	0	0	35	2
(Fiji) 2003	Fourth place	4th	6	3	0	3	25	7
(Samoa) 2007	Group stage	6th	4	1	1	2	2	6
(New Caledonia) 2011	Third place	3rd	6	3	1	2	28	9
(Papua New Guinea) 2015	Runners-up	2nd	5	3	1	1	34	4
(Samoa) 2019	Group stage	5th	5	3	0	2	19	6
Total	5 Titles	15/15	70	47	6	17	330	70

=== Polynesia Cup ===
Polynesia Cup record
Year	Round	Position	Pld	W	D*	L	GF	GA
(Samoa) 1994	Champions	1st	3	3	0	0	10	1
(Cook Islands) 1998	Champions	1st	4	4	0	0	27	1
(French Polynesia) 2000	Champions	1st	4	4	0	0	30	2
Total	3 Titles	3/3	11	11	0	0	67	4

=== Coupe de l'Outre-Mer ===
Coupe de l'Outre-Mer record
Year	Round	Position	Pld	W	D*	L	GF	GA
(France) 2008	Group stage	7th	3	0	0	3	0	3
(France) 2010	Group stage	6th	3	0	2	1	3	6
(France) 2012	Sixth place	6th	4	2	0	2	6	7
Total	0 Titles	3/3	10	2	2	6	9	16

== Head-to-head record ==
The lists shown below detail the national football team of Tahiti's all-time international record against opposing nations.

The Tahiti national football team is the national team of French Polynesia and is controlled by the Fédération Tahitienne de Football. The team consists of a selection of players from French Polynesia, not just Tahiti.

Tahiti played their first full match on 21 September 1952 when they recorded a 2–2 draw at home against New Zealand. Their first competitive match came almost 11 years later when they entered the South Pacific Games for the first time in 1963, finishing third.

The following tables show Tahiti's all-time international record, correct as of 1 October 2026 vs. Cook Islands.

=== AFC ===
Team	Pld	W	D	L	GF	GA	GD	WPCT
Guam	2	2	0	0	26	0	+26	100.00
Northern Mariana Islands	1	1	0	0	5	0	+5	100.00
Total	3	3	0	0	31	0	+31	100.00

=== CAF ===
Team	Pld	W	D	L	GF	GA	GD	WPCT
Mayotte	1	0	0	1	1	3	−2	0.00
Nigeria	1	0	0	1	1	6	−5	0.00
Total	2	0	0	2	2	9	−7	0.00

=== CONCACAF ===
Team	Pld	W	D	L	GF	GA	GD	WPCT
French Guiana	1	0	0	1	1	2	−1	0.00
Guadeloupe	2	0	1	1	1	2	−1	0.00
Martinique	3	1	0	2	4	7	−3	33.33
Mexico	1	0	0	1	0	1	−1	0.00
Total	7	1	1	5	6	12	−6	14.29

=== CONMEBOL ===
Team	Pld	W	D	L	GF	GA	GD	WPCT
Uruguay	1	0	0	1	0	8	−8	0.00
Total	1	0	0	1	0	8	−8	0.00

=== OFC ===
Team	Pld	W	D	L	GF	GA	GD	WPCT
American Samoa	4	4	0	0	40	2	+38	100.00
Australia (Note: Football Federation Australia were founder members of the Oceania Football Confederation (OFC) before joining the Asian Football Confederation in 2006. Matches against Australia prior to 2006 are included in the OFC section.)	10	0	1	9	4	42	−38	0.00
Cook Islands	10	9	0	1	69	4	+65	90.00
Federated States of Micronesia	1	1	0	0	17	0	+17	100.00
Fiji	35	18	10	7	63	39	+24	51.43
Kiribati	1	1	0	0	17	1	+16	100.00
New Caledonia	65	24	13	28	81	110	−29	36.92
New Zealand	17	2	2	13	13	52	−39	11.76
Niue	1	1	0	0	14	0	+14	100.00
Papua New Guinea	17	11	5	1	50	19	+31	64.71
Samoa (Note: Includes results as Western Samoa.)	9	9	0	0	47	4	+43	100.00
Solomon Islands	24	15	3	6	74	27	+47	62.50
Tonga	6	6	0	0	28	1	+27	100.00
Tuvalu	3	2	1	0	26	1	+25	66.67
Vanuatu (Note: Includes results as New Hebrides.)	26	18	3	5	64	28	+36	69.23
Wallis and Futuna	4	4	0	0	27	0	+27	100.00
Total	233	125	38	70	634	330	+304	53.65

=== UEFA ===
Team	Pld	W	D	L	GF	GA	GD	WPCT
Spain	1	0	0	1	0	10	−10	0.00
Total	1	0	0	1	0	10	−10	0.00

=== Full Confederation record ===
Team	Pld	W	D	L	GF	GA	GD	WPCT
AFC	3	3	0	0	31	0	+31	100.00
CAF	2	0	0	2	2	9	−7	0.00
CONCACAF	7	1	1	5	6	12	−6	14.29
CONMEBOL	1	0	0	1	0	8	−8	0.00
OFC	231	124	38	69	629	326	+303	53.68
UEFA	1	0	0	1	0	10	−10	0.00
Total	245	128	39	78	668	365	+303	52.24
