= New Caledonia national football team results (1951–1999) =

The New Caledonia national football team represents New Caledonia in association football and is controlled by the Fédération Calédonienne de Football (FCF), the governing body of the sport in the territory. Before joining Fédération Internationale de Football Association (FIFA) and the Oceania Football Confederation (OFC), it played its first match in September 1951 – a 2–0 victory against New Zealand.

Between 1951 and 1999, New Caledonia played a total of 157 matches. The territory recorded 80 wins, 18 draws and 59 defeats, scoring 413 goals and conceding 302.

In 2004, FCF joined both FIFA and the OFC and the national team began competing in the qualifying stages of the FIFA World Cup and the OFC Men's Nations Cup. Prior to this, the team contested mostly friendly matches as well as competing at the South Pacific Games, South Pacific Mini Games and the Melanesia Cup – the forerunner to the MSG Prime Minister's Cup.

In 1973, New Caledonia took part in the inaugural Oceania Cup – the forerunner to the OFC Men's Nations Cup – in New Zealand. After finishing third in the round robin phase, New Caledonia defeated the New Hebrides 2–1 to finish third. Seven years later, New Caledonia hosted the second edition of the Oceania Cup. After finishing runner-up in their group, New Caledonia defeated Fiji in the third-place play-off to again finish third.

The team also attained success in the South Pacific Games. In 1963, at the inaugural South Pacific Games in Suva, Fiji, New Caledonia won their semi-final before recording an 8–2 win against hosts Fiji in the gold medal match. Three years later, they narrowly missed out on retaining their crown as hosts after losing 2–0 to Tahiti in the gold medal match. They would go onto win further gold medals in 1969, 1971 and 1987.

== Key ==
Key to matches

- Att. = Match attendance
- (H) = Home ground
- (A) = Away ground
- (N) = Neutral ground

Key to record by opponent

- Pld = Games played
- W = Games won
- D = Games drawn
- L = Games lost
- GF = Goals for
- GA = Goals against

== Results ==
New Caledonia's score is shown first in each case.

No.	Date	Venue	Opponents	Score	Competition	New Caledonia scorers	Att.	Ref.
1	19 September 1951	Nouméa (H)	New Zealand	2–0	Friendly	Unknown	—	
2	22 September 1951	Nouméa (H)	New Zealand	4–6	Friendly	Unknown	—	
3	24 September 1951	Nouméa (H)	New Zealand	2–0	Friendly	Unknown	—	
4	30 September 1951	Nouméa (H)	New Zealand	1–3	Friendly	Unknown	—	
5	September 1953	New Caledonia (H)	Tahiti	4–1	Friendly	Unknown	—	
6	September 1953	New Caledonia (H)	Tahiti	5–0	Friendly	Unknown	—	
7	July 1955	French Polynesia (A)	Tahiti	1–1	Friendly	Unknown	—	
8	July 1955	French Polynesia (A)	Tahiti	1–3	Friendly	Unknown	—	
9	September 1957	New Caledonia (H)	Tahiti	2–0	Friendly	Unknown	—	
10	September 1957	New Caledonia (H)	Tahiti	2–1	Friendly	Unknown	—	
11	September 1957	New Caledonia (H)	Tahiti	2–4	Friendly	Unknown	—	
12	31 August 1958	Nouméa (H)	New Zealand	1–2	Friendly	Unknown	—	
13	7 September 1958	Nouméa (H)	New Zealand	1–5	Friendly	Unknown	—	
14	14 September 1958	Nouméa (H)	New Zealand	1–2	Friendly	Unknown	—	
15	July 1959	French Polynesia (A)	Tahiti	4–2	Friendly	Unknown	—	
16	July 1959	French Polynesia (A)	Tahiti	1–3	Friendly	Unknown	—	
17	September 1961	New Caledonia (H)	Tahiti	2–1	Friendly	Unknown	—	
18	September 1961	New Caledonia (H)	Tahiti	2–2	Friendly	Unknown	—	
19	September 1961	New Caledonia (H)	Tahiti	3–0	Friendly	Unknown	—	
20	2 June 1962	Christchurch (A)	New Zealand	1–4	Friendly	Unknown	—	
21	4 June 1962	Wellington (A)	New Zealand	2–4	Friendly	Unknown	—	
22	1 September 1963	Buckhurst Park, Suva (N)	Tahiti	2–1 (a.e.t.)	1963 South Pacific Games	Case (2)	—	
23	7 September 1963	Buckhurst Park, Suva (N)	Fiji	8–2	1963 South Pacific Games	Paula (3), Bénébig, Case (4)	—	
24	September 1964	French Polynesia (A)	Tahiti	2–0	Friendly	Unknown	—	
25	September 1964	French Polynesia (A)	Tahiti	1–4	Friendly	Unknown	—	
26	September 1965	New Caledonia (H)	Tahiti	2–1	Friendly	Unknown	—	
27	September 1965	New Caledonia (H)	Tahiti	4–1	Friendly	Unknown	—	
28	9 December 1966	Nouméa (N)	Solomon Islands	8–0	1966 South Pacific Games	Unknown	—	
29	12 December 1966	Nouméa (N)	New Hebrides	5–0	1966 South Pacific Games	Unknown	—	
30	15 December 1966	Nouméa (N)	Papua New Guinea	4–0	1966 South Pacific Games	Unknown	—	
31	18 December 1966	Nouméa (N)	Tahiti	0–2	1966 South Pacific Games		—	
32	8 November 1967	Nouméa (H)	New Zealand	4–0	Friendly	Unknown	—	
33	19 September 1968	New Caledonia (H)	Fiji	2–1	Friendly	Unknown	—	
34	8 October 1968	Auckland (A)	New Zealand	3–1	Friendly	Unknown	—	
35	December 1968	New Caledonia (H)	Tahiti	1–0	Friendly	Unknown	—	
36	December 1968	New Caledonia (H)	Tahiti	1–1	Friendly	Unknown	—	
37	25 July 1969	Nouméa (H)	New Zealand	0–0	Friendly		—	
38	27 July 1969	Nouméa (H)	New Zealand	2–0	Friendly	Unknown	—	
39	29 July 1969	Nouméa (H)	New Zealand	3–2	Friendly	Unknown	—	
40	14 August 1969	Club Germania, Port Moresby (N)	Papua New Guinea	4–1	1969 South Pacific Games	Poithily, Zeoula (2), Delmas	—	
41	15 August 1969	Club Germania, Port Moresby (N)	Solomon Islands	1–1	1969 South Pacific Games	Unknown	—	
42	16 August 1969	Club Germania, Port Moresby (N)	New Hebrides	2–0	1969 South Pacific Games	Unknown	—	
43	18 August 1969	Club Germania, Port Moresby (N)	Fiji	11–0	1969 South Pacific Games	Unknown	—	
44	20 August 1969	Club Germania, Port Moresby (N)	Tahiti	–	1969 South Pacific Games		—	
45	22 August 1969	Sir Hubert Murray Stadium, Port Moresby (N)	Tahiti	2–1	1969 South Pacific Games	Teamboueon, Fi	—	
46	July 1970	French Polynesia (A)	Tahiti	2–0	Friendly	Unknown	—	
47	July 1970	French Polynesia (A)	Tahiti	1–3	Friendly	Unknown	—	
48	23 October 1970	Stade Numa-Daly Magenta, Nouméa (H)	Australia	1–3	Friendly	Poithily	2,400	
49	25 October 1970	Stade Numa-Daly Magenta, Nouméa (H)	Australia	0–1	Friendly		2,290	
50	18 July 1971	Stade Numa-Daly Magenta, Nouméa (H)	New Zealand	4–2	Friendly	Unknown	—	
51	20 July 1971	Stade Numa-Daly Magenta, Nouméa (H)	New Zealand	2–1	Friendly	Unknown	—	
52	9 September 1971	Papeete (N)	Fiji	5–1	1971 South Pacific Games	Unknown	—	
53	13 September 1971	Papeete (N)	New Hebrides	0–0	1971 South Pacific Games		—	
54	16 September 1971	Papeete (N)	Papua New Guinea	4–0	1971 South Pacific Games	Unknown	—	
55	18 September 1971	Papeete (N)	New Hebrides	7–1	1971 South Pacific Games	Unknown	16,000	
56	17 September 1972	Basin Reserve, Wellington (A)	New Zealand	1–4	Friendly	Wayewol	—	
57	30 September 1972	Newmarket Park, Auckland (A)	New Zealand	1–2	Friendly	Anglio	—	
58	14 October 1972	Stade Numa-Daly Magenta, Nouméa (H)	New Zealand	3–1	Friendly	Unknown	—	
59	17 December 1972	New Caledonia (H)	Tahiti	4–1	Friendly	Unknown	—	
60	8 February 1973	Stade Numa-Daly Magenta, Nouméa (H)	Bulgaria	3–5	Friendly	Unknown	15,000	
61	17 February 1973	Newmarket Park, Auckland (N)	Tahiti	1–2	1973 OFC Nations Cup	Mandin	—	
62	18 February 1973	Newmarket Park, Auckland (N)	New Hebrides	4–1	1973 OFC Nations Cup	J. Hmae (2), Wayewol, Wacapo	—	
63	20 February 1973	Newmarket Park, Auckland (N)	Fiji	2–0	1973 OFC Nations Cup	Wayewol (2)	—	
64	21 February 1973	Newmarket Park, Auckland (N)	New Zealand	1–2	1973 OFC Nations Cup	Xowie	—	
65	24 February 1973	Newmarket Park, Auckland (N)	New Hebrides	2–1	1973 OFC Nations Cup	Delmas, Xowie	—	
66	February 1974	French Polynesia (A)	Tahiti	2–1	Friendly	Unknown	—	
67	February 1974	French Polynesia (A)	Tahiti	1–2	Friendly	Unknown	—	
68	February 1974	French Polynesia (A)	Tahiti	2–2	Friendly	Unknown	—	
69	2 August 1975	Guam (N)	Tahiti	3–0	1975 South Pacific Games	Unknown	—	
70	4 August 1975	Guam (N)	New Hebrides	3–1	1975 South Pacific Games	Unknown	—	
71	5 August 1975	Guam (N)	Papua New Guinea	5–1	1975 South Pacific Games	Unknown	—	
72	7 August 1975	Guam (N)	Solomon Islands	4–0	1975 South Pacific Games	Unknown	—	
73	9 August 1975	Guam (N)	Tahiti	1–2	1975 South Pacific Games	Unknown	—	
74	2 October 1976	Stade Numa-Daly Magenta, Nouméa (H)	New Zealand	2–1	Friendly	W. Hmae	—	
75	5 March 1977	Newmarket Park, Auckland (A)	New Zealand	0–3	Friendly		—	
76	8 March 1977	Newmarket Park, Auckland (A)	New Zealand	0–4	Friendly		—	
77	August 1978	New Caledonia (H)	Tahiti	2–0	Friendly	Unknown	—	
78	August 1978	New Caledonia (H)	Tahiti	3–4	Friendly	Unknown	—	
79	1979	Fiji (A)	Fiji	5–0	Friendly	Unknown	—	
80	1979	Fiji (A)	Fiji	2–5	Friendly	Unknown	—	
81	26 July 1979	Stade Numa-Daly Magenta, Nouméa (H)	New Zealand	0–2	Friendly		—	
82	30 August 1979	Buckhurst Park, Suva (N)	Guam	10–1	1979 South Pacific Games	Unknown	—	
83	31 August 1979	Buckhurst Park, Suva (N)	New Hebrides	3–0	1979 South Pacific Games	Wayewol (2), Wacapo	—	
84	3 September 1979	Buckhurst Park, Suva (N)	Tuvalu	11–0	1979 South Pacific Games	Xowie (5), Suihuliwa (4), Kenon, Fouidja	—	
85	4 September 1979	Buckhurst Park, Suva (N)	Tahiti	2–3	1979 South Pacific Games	Unknown	—	
86	7 September 1979	Buckhurst Park, Suva (N)	Solomon Islands	1–3	1979 South Pacific Games	Ukeiwé	—	
87	24 February 1980	Nouméa (N)	Australia	0–8	1980 OFC Nations Cup		—	
88	26 February 1980	Nouméa (N)	New Hebrides	4–3	1980 OFC Nations Cup	Unknown	—	
89	28 February 1980	Nouméa (N)	Papua New Guinea	8–0	1980 OFC Nations Cup	Unknown	—	
90	1 March 1980	Nouméa (N)	Fiji	2–1	1980 OFC Nations Cup	Unknown	—	
91	7 July 1981	Honiara (N)	Tahiti	0–1	1981 South Pacific Mini Games		—	
92	8 July 1981	Lawson Tama Stadium, Honiara (N)	Vanuatu	2–2	1981 South Pacific Mini Games	Drudri, Wamai	—	
93	9 July 1981	SIPL, Honiara (N)	Solomon Islands	1–1	1981 South Pacific Mini Games	Pa'ama	—	
94	10 July 1981	Lawson Tama Stadium, Honiara (N)	Papua New Guinea	5–1	1981 South Pacific Mini Games	Coulon, Gure (o.g.)	—	
95	13 July 1981	Lawson Tama Stadium, Honiara (N)	Fiji	3–0	1981 South Pacific Mini Games	Pa'ama (3)	—	
96	14 July 1981	Lawson Tama Stadium, Honiara (N)	Western Samoa	8–0	1981 South Pacific Mini Games	Gowe (3), Pa'ama (2), Iopue, Kenon, Wabealo	—	
97	15 July 1981	Lawson Tama Stadium, Honiara (N)	Tahiti	0–1 (a.e.t.)	1981 South Pacific Mini Games		—	
98	September 1983	Apia (N)	Vanuatu	6–2	1983 South Pacific Games	Unknown	—	
99	September 1983	Apia (N)	Solomon Islands	1–0	1983 South Pacific Games	Unknown	—	
100	September 1983	Apia (N)	Fiji	1–5	1983 South Pacific Games	Unknown	—	
101	September 1983	Apia (N)	Wallis and Futuna	4–0	1983 South Pacific Games	Unknown	—	
102	September 1983	Apia (N)	Fiji	2–3	1983 South Pacific Games	Unknown	—	
103	September 1983	Apia (N)	Papua New Guinea	2–1	1983 South Pacific Games	Unknown	—	
104	23 April 1987	Fiji (A)	Fiji	1–2	Friendly	Unknown	—	
105	25 April 1987	Fiji (A)	Fiji	0–1	Friendly		—	
106	May 1987	New Caledonia (H)	Tahiti	2–0	Friendly	Unknown	—	
107	14 May 1987	New Zealand (N)	Tahiti	0–0	Friendly		—	
108	9 December 1987	Nouméa (N)	American Samoa	10–0	1987 South Pacific Games	Unknown	—	
109	10 December 1987	Nouméa (N)	Papua New Guinea	2–0	1987 South Pacific Games	Unknown	—	
110	12 December 1987	Nouméa (N)	Tahiti	2–3	1987 South Pacific Games	Unknown	—	
111	15 December 1987	Nouméa (N)	Wallis and Futuna	5–1	1987 South Pacific Games	Unknown	—	
112	17 December 1987	Nouméa (N)	Vanuatu	6–0	1987 South Pacific Games	Unknown	—	
113	19 December 1987	Nouméa (N)	Tahiti	1–0	1987 South Pacific Games	Unknown	—	
114	23 October 1988	Solomon Islands (N)	Vanuatu	6–1	1988 Melanesia Cup	Unknown	—	
115	24 October 1988	Solomon Islands (N)	Solomon Islands	0–1	1988 Melanesia Cup		—	
116	25 October 1988	Solomon Islands (N)	Fiji	0–2	1988 Melanesia Cup		—	
117	26 October 1988	Solomon Islands (N)	Vanuatu	0–1	1988 Melanesia Cup		—	
118	30 October 1989	Fiji (N)	Solomon Islands	2–0	1989 Melanesia Cup	Unknown	—	
119	31 October 1989	Fiji (N)	Fiji	0–3	1989 Melanesia Cup		—	
120	3 November 1989	Fiji (N)	Vanuatu	5–1	1989 Melanesia Cup	Unknown	—	
121	4 November 1989	Fiji (N)	Papua New Guinea	2–1	1989 Melanesia Cup	Unknown	—	
122	1 November 1990	Nouméa (N)	Vanuatu	0–1	1988 Melanesia Cup		—	
123	3 November 1990	Nouméa (N)	Papua New Guinea	2–1	1990 Melanesia Cup	Wanessi (2)	—	
124	5 November 1990	Nouméa (N)	Fiji	0–0	1990 Melanesia Cup		—	
125	8 November 1990	Nouméa (N)	Solomon Islands	3–1	1990 Melanesia Cup	Unknown	—	
126	10 September 1991	Sir Ignatius Kilage Stadium, Lae (N)	Fiji	1–3	1991 South Pacific Games	Wayaridri	—	
127	12 September 1991	Sir Ignatius Kilage Stadium, Lae (N)	Tahiti	2–2	1991 South Pacific Games	Unknown	—	
128	14 September 1991	Sir Ignatius Kilage Stadium, Lae (N)	Guam	18–0	1991 South Pacific Games	Waitronyie (4), Decoire (3), Waneissi (3), Wayaridri (2), Réveillon (2), Boano (2), Unknown (2)	—	
129	17 September 1991	Sir Ignatius Kilage Stadium, Lae (N)	Solomon Islands	1–4	1991 South Pacific Games	Wayaridri	—	
130	19 September 1991	Sir Ignatius Kilage Stadium, Lae (N)	Vanuatu	3–0	1991 South Pacific Games	Unknown	—	
131	12 July 1992	New Caledonia (H)	Tahiti	0–1	Friendly		—	
132	22 July 1992	New Caledonia (H)	Tahiti	1–2	Friendly	Unknown	—	
133	25 July 1992	Korman Stadium, Port Vila (N)	Vanuatu	1–0	1992 Melanesia Cup	Aussu	—	
134	28 July 1992	Korman Stadium, Port Vila (N)	Fiji	2–2	1992 Melanesia Cup	Aussu, Tchaunyane	—	
135	30 July 1992	Korman Stadium, Port Vila (N)	Solomon Islands	1–0	1992 Melanesia Cup	Tchaunyane	—	
136	8 December 1993	Port Vila (N)	Papua New Guinea	1–1	1993 South Pacific Mini Games	Unknown	—	
137	10 December 1993	Port Vila (N)	Vanuatu	1–1	1993 South Pacific Mini Games	Unknown	—	
138	13 December 1993	Port Vila (N)	Tonga	11–0	1993 South Pacific Mini Games	Unknown	—	
139	14 December 1993	Port Vila (N)	Tahiti	1–2	1993 South Pacific Mini Games	Unknown	—	
140	16 December 1993	Port Vila (N)	Vanuatu	2–1	1993 South Pacific Mini Games	Unknown	—	
141	3 July 1994	Solomon Islands (N)	Papua New Guinea	0–1	1994 Melanesia Cup		—	
142	4 July 1994	Solomon Islands (N)	Fiji	1–3	1994 Melanesia Cup	Unknown	—	
143	5 July 1994	Solomon Islands (N)	Vanuatu	3–2	1994 Melanesia Cup	Unknown	—	
144	8 July 1994	Solomon Islands (N)	Solomon Islands	1–3	1994 Melanesia Cup	Unknown	—	
145	14 August 1995	French Polynesia (N)	Cook Islands	12–0	Friendly	Unknown	—	
146	16 August 1995	French Polynesia (N)	Cook Islands	9–0	1995 South Pacific Games	Unknown	—	
147	18 August 1995	French Polynesia (N)	Solomon Islands	0–1	1995 South Pacific Games		—	
148	20 August 1995	French Polynesia (N)	Wallis and Futuna	10–0	1995 South Pacific Games	Unknown	—	
149	21 August 1995	French Polynesia (N)	Tahiti	0–2	1995 South Pacific Games		—	
150	1996	Fiji (A)	Fiji	0–1	Friendly		—	
151	1996	Fiji (A)	Fiji	0–4	Friendly		—	
152	1996	Fiji (A)	Fiji	1–5	Friendly	Unknown	—	
153	1 May 1997	Fiji (A)	Fiji	1–5	Friendly	Unknown	—	
154	5 September 1998	Espiritu Santo (N)	Fiji	0–3	1998 Melanesia Cup		—	
155	7 September 1995	Espiritu Santo (N)	Papua New Guinea	0–1	1998 Melanesia Cup		—	
156	8 September 1998	Espiritu Santo (N)	Solomon Islands	2–3	1998 Melanesia Cup	Unknown	—	
157	12 September 1998	Espiritu Santo (N)	Vanuatu	2–3	1998 Melanesia Cup	Unknown	—	

Notes

1. A: Tahiti forfeited the match as they were unable to field a team following injuries to 11 of their 19-man squad.
2. B: The 1994 Melanesia Cup doubled as qualifiers for the 1996 OFC Nations Cup.
3. C: The 1998 Melanesia Cup doubled as qualifiers for the 1998 OFC Nations Cup.

== Record by opponent ==
Team	Pld	W	D	L	GF	GA	GD	WPCT
American Samoa	1	1	0	0	10	0	+10	100.00
Australia	3	0	0	3	1	12	−11	0.00
Bulgaria	1	0	0	1	3	5	−2	0.00
Cook Islands	2	2	0	0	21	0	+21	100.00
Fiji	24	8	2	14	50	52	−2	33.33
Guam	2	2	0	0	28	1	+27	100.00
New Zealand	24	10	1	13	41	51	−10	41.67
Papua New Guinea	13	10	1	2	39	79	−40	76.92
Samoa (Note: Includes results as Western Samoa.)	1	1	0	0	8	0	+8	100.00
Solomon Islands	14	6	2	6	26	18	+8	42.86
Tahiti	45	19	9	17	77	61	+16	42.22
Tonga	1	1	0	0	11	0	+11	100.00
Tuvalu	1	1	0	0	11	0	+11	100.00
Vanuatu (Note: Includes results as New Hebrides.)	22	16	3	3	68	22	+46	72.73
Wallis and Futuna	3	3	0	0	19	1	+18	100.00
Total	157	80	18	59	413	302	+111	50.96

Source: Results
