= Wallis and Futuna national football team =

National association football team

Wallis and Futuna
- Association: Wallis and Futuna Soccer Federation
- Home stadium: Stade de Mata Utu
- FIFA code: WLF

First international
- Wallis and Futuna 0–5 Tahiti (Nouméa, New Caledonia; 11 December 1966)

Biggest win
- Wallis and Futuna 5–0 Guam (Lae, Papua New Guinea; 18 September 1991)

Biggest defeat
- Tahiti 13–0 Wallis and Futuna (Papeete, Tahiti; 17 August 1995)

Pacific Games
- Appearances: 6 (first in 1966)
- Best result: Fifth place (1983, 1987)

The Wallis and Futuna national football team (French: Équipe de Wallis-et-Futuna de football) is the national football team of Wallis and Futuna. Wallis and Futuna is not a member of FIFA and, therefore, is not eligible to enter either the FIFA World Cup or the OFC Nations Cup, and due to the low investment in sport on the part of the country, it has been many years since it played an international match.

Wallis and Futuna has played twenty-four international matches, all at the South Pacific Games between 1966 and 1995, and holds an overall record of five wins and nineteen defeats.

== History ==
=== Beginnings ===
In 1966, there was an initiative for the small country to play in the South Pacific Games that year. The proposal was carried out and Wallis and Futuna entered the group stage, losing 5–0 to Tahiti and 9–1 to Papua New Guinea.

They achieved their best results at the 1979 South Pacific Games, qualifying to the knock-out stages with a 3–1 victory over Western Samoa after losing to Solomon Islands 6–0. They lost their quarter-final match against Fiji 5–0 which qualified them for the Consolation Tournament, where they were eliminated by Tonga 1–0. At the 1983 South Pacific Games, they lost their first group match 3–0 against American Samoa but a 2–1 victory over Western Samoa and a 3–0 win against Tonga meant that they topped their group. In the quarter-finals they lost 4–0 to New Caledonia, eliminating them from the competition.

=== Decline ===
The 1987 South Pacific Games was played as a round-robin, resulting in four defeats for Wallis and Futuna, with their only victory coming against American Samoa 5–1. At the 1991 South Pacific Games they lost in each of their group stage matches and were defeated by Tahiti in the Consolation Tournament, qualifying them for the seventh-place playoff where they beat Guam 5–0.

=== Inactivity ===
The last time Wallis and Futuna played a game was in 1995. In this edition, the team lost all 4 games it played. Since then it has been completely inactive.

== Competitive record ==
=== Pacific Games ===
Pacific Games record
Year	Round	Position	Pld	W	D*	L	GF	GA
(Fiji) 1963	Did not enter							
(New Caledonia) 1966	Group stage	6th	2	0	0	2	1	14
(Papua New Guinea) 1969	Did not enter							
(French Polynesia) 1971	Did not enter							
(Guam) 1975	Did not enter							
(Fiji) 1979	Quarter-finals	10th	4	1	0	3	3	13
(Samoa) 1983	Quarter-finals	6th	4	2	0	2	5	8
(New Caledonia) 1987	Fifth place	5th	5	1	0	4	7	18
(Papua New Guinea) 1991	Group stage	7th	5	1	0	4	6	18
(French Polynesia) 1995	Group stage	9th	4	0	0	4	2	37
(Fiji) 2003	Did not enter							
(Samoa) 2007	Did not enter							
(New Caledonia) 2011	Did not enter							
(Papua New Guinea) 2015	Did not enter							
(Samoa) 2019	Did not enter							
(Solomon Islands) 2023	Did not enter							
Total	Quarter finals	6/15	24	5	0	19	24	108

== Head-to-head record ==
Team	Pld	W	D	L	GF	GA	GD	WPCT
American Samoa	2	1	0	1	5	4	+1	50.00
Cook Islands	1	0	0	1	1	2	−1	0.00
Fiji	1	0	0	1	0	5	−5	0.00
Guam	1	1	0	0	5	0	+5	100.00
New Caledonia	3	0	0	3	1	19	−18	0.00
Papua New Guinea	3	0	0	3	2	14	−12	0.00
Samoa (Note: Includes results as Western Samoa.)	2	2	0	0	5	2	+3	100.00
Solomon Islands	3	0	0	3	1	25	−24	0.00
Tahiti	4	0	0	4	0	27	−27	0.00
Tonga	2	1	0	1	3	1	+2	50.00
Vanuatu	2	0	0	2	1	10	−9	0.00
Total	24	5	0	19	24	109	−85	20.83

Source: Results

== Match history ==
Wallis and Futuna's score is shown first in each case.

No.	Date	Venue	Opponents	Score	Competition	Wallis and Futuna scorers	Att.	Ref.
1	11 December 1966	Nouméa (N)	Tahiti	0–5	1966 South Pacific Games		–	
2	13 December 1966	Nouméa (N)	Papua New Guinea	1–9	1966 South Pacific Games	Unknown	–	
3	29 August 1979	Buckhurst Park, Suva (N)	Solomon Islands	0–6	1979 South Pacific Games		–	
4	1 September 1979	Ratu Cakobau Park, Nausori (N)	Western Samoa	3–1	1979 South Pacific Games	Unknown	–	
5	3 September 1979	Ratu Cakobau Park, Nausori (A)	Fiji	0–5	1979 South Pacific Games		–	
6	5 September 1979	Ratu Cakobau Park, Nausori (N)	Tonga	0–1	1979 South Pacific Games		–	
7	20 August 1983	Apia (N)	American Samoa	0–3	1983 South Pacific Games		–	
8	22 August 1983	Apia (A)	Western Samoa	2–1	1983 South Pacific Games	Unknown	–	
9	24 August 1983	Apia (N)	Tonga	3–0	1983 South Pacific Games	Unknown	–	
10	26 August 1983	Apia (N)	New Caledonia	0–4	1983 South Pacific Games		–	
11	9 December 1987	Nouméa (N)	Vanuatu	1–6	1987 South Pacific Games	Unknown	–	
12	10 December 1987	Nouméa (N)	Tahiti	0–4	1987 South Pacific Games		–	
13	12 December 1987	Nouméa (N)	American Samoa	5–1	1987 South Pacific Games	Unknown	–	
14	15 December 1987	Nouméa (A)	New Caledonia	1–5	1987 South Pacific Games	Unknown	–	
15	17 December 1987	Nouméa (A)	Papua New Guinea	0–2	1987 South Pacific Games		–	
16	9 September 1991	Sir Ignatius Kilage Stadium, Lae (N)	Vanuatu	0–4	1991 South Pacific Games		–	
17	11 September 1991	Sir Ignatius Kilage Stadium, Lae (N)	Solomon Islands	0–5	1991 South Pacific Games		–	
18	13 September 1991	Sir Ignatius Kilage Stadium, Lae (A)	Papua New Guinea	1–3	1991 South Pacific Games	Unknown	–	
19	17 September 1991	Sir Ignatius Kilage Stadium, Lae (N)	Tahiti	0–5	1991 South Pacific Games		–	
20	18 September 1991	Sir Ignatius Kilage Stadium, Lae (N)	Guam	5–0	1991 South Pacific Games	Unknown	–	
21	16 August 1995	Papeete (N)	Solomon Islands	1–12	1995 South Pacific Games	Unknown	–	
22	17 August 1995	Papeete (A)	Tahiti	0–13	1995 South Pacific Games		–	
23	19 August 1995	Papeete (N)	Cook Islands	1–2	1995 South Pacific Games	Unknown	–	
24	20 August 1995	Papeete (N)	New Caledonia	0–10	1995 South Pacific Games		–	

== Coach history ==
- (France) Marcel Mao (1979)

== Historical kits ==
1983; Pacific Games	1983; Pacific Games (Gray version)
