= Rudi Gutendorf =

German football manager (1926–2019)

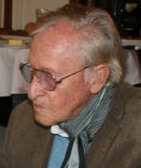
- Gutendorf in 2011

Personal information
- Date of birth: 30 August 1926
- Place of birth: Koblenz, Weimar Germany
- Date of death: 13 September 2019 (aged 93)
- Position: Right winger

Senior career*
Years	Team	Apps	(Gls)
1942–1951	TuS Neuendorf	93	(46)
1954–1955	Blue Stars Zürich		
1955–1961	Luzern	27	(6)

Managerial career
- 1955: Blue Stars Zürich (player-manager)
- 1955–1961: Luzern (player-manager)
- 1961: US Monastir
- 1963–1964: MSV Duisburg
- 1965–1966: VfB Stuttgart
- 1968: St Louis Stars
- 1968: Bermuda
- 1968–1970: Schalke 04
- 1970–1971: Kickers Offenbach
- 1971: Sporting Cristal
- 1972–1973: Chile
- 1974: Bolivia
- 1974: Venezuela
- 1974: 1860 Munich
- 1975: Real Valladolid
- 1975–1976: Fortuna Köln
- 1976: Trinidad & Tobago
- 1976: Grenada
- 1976: Antigua & Barbuda
- 1976: Botswana
- 1976–1977: Tennis Borussia Berlin
- 1977: Hamburger SV
- 1979–1981: Australia
- 1981: New Caledonia
- 1981: Nepal
- 1981: Tonga
- 1981: Tanzania
- 1983: Fiji
- 1984: Hertha BSC
- 1984: São Tomé & Príncipe
- 1984–1985: Yomiuri SC
- 1985–1986: Ghana
- 1986: Nepal
- 1987: Fiji
- 1988: China
- 1988: Iran U-23
- 1991–1992: China
- 1993: Mauritius
- 1995–1996: Zimbabwe
- 1997: Mauritius
- 1999: Rwanda
- 2003: Samoa
Medal record
Men's Football
Representing Australia (as manager)
OFC Nations Cup
Winner	1980 New Caledonia
Representing Fiji (as manager)
Pacific Games
Silver medal – second place	1983 Apia
Representing Rwanda (as manager)
CECAFA Cup
Winner	1999 Rwanda
- * Club domestic league appearances and goals

Rudolf Gutendorf (30 August 1926 – 13 September 2019) was a German football manager, renowned for managing the highest number of national teams – a total of 18 teams plus Iran's Olympic team in 1988 and the China Olympic team in 1992.

Gutendorf holds a Guinness World Record for coaching 55 teams in 32 countries, across six continents.

== Playing career ==
Gutendorf played for TuS Neuendorf, Blue Stars Zürich and Luzern.

Neuendorf reached the semi finals of the German championship in 1948, but were beaten by Kaiserslautern.

== Coaching career ==
His last coaching job was in 2003 with the Samoa national football team.

== Filmography ==
- 1999: "Der Ball ist ein Sauhund"
- 15 November 1999: "Beckmann"
- 2006: "Volle Kanne – Service täglich"
- 2009: "Mein Ehrgeiz galt dem Fußball und den Frauen"

== Honours ==
Luzern

- Swiss Cup: 1959–60
- Nationalliga B promotion: 1957–58

Duisburg

- Bundesliga runners-up 1963–64

Schalke

- DFB Pokal runners-up 1968–69

Chile

- Copa Carlos Dittborn runners-up: 1972

Australia

- OFC Nations Cup: 1980

Fiji

- South Pacific Games silver medal 1983

Rwanda

- CECAFA Cup: 1999

Individual

- Cross of Merit of the Federal Republic of Germany
