= Didier Chambaron =

French professional football manager

Personal information
- Full name: Didier Chambaron
- Date of birth: 12 October 1971 (age 55)
- Place of birth: France

Managerial career
- Years: Team
- 2007–2010: New Caledonia
Medal record
Men's football
Representing New Caledonia(as manager)
OFC Nations Cup
Runner-up	2008 Oceania
Pacific Games
Gold medal – first place	2007 Samoa

Didier Chambaron (born 12 October 1971) is a French professional football manager. Between 2007 and 2010, he coached the New Caledonia national football team.

== Honours ==
=== Manager ===
New Caledonia

- OFC Nations Cup: runner-up 2008
- Pacific Games: Gold Medalist, 2007
