= Football in Wallis and Futuna =

- Country: Wallis and Futuna
- Governing body: Wallis and Futuna Soccer Federation
- National team: men's national team

International competitions
- OFC Champions League; FIFA World Cup

The sport of football in the overseas collectivity of Wallis and Futuna is governed by the Fédération de Ligue de Football de Wallis et Futuna. The association administers the Wallis and Futuna national football team as well as the Wallis Première Division and the Futuna Première Division. No women's football is known of, though it is possible that the sport is not segregated by gender for youth football.

The first evidence of the sport on the islands is that the national team competed in the 1966 South Pacific Games, where they would exit in the group stages and not return until 1979. From then they would appear regularly, with a final appearance in 1995. Women's football would not debut until the 2003 games, so Wallis and Futuna have never competed. News of football from the islands is limited, and the sport seems to have diminished, though there are photos from an 11-a-side match in 2015 and vague references to a 7-a-side tournament on Wallis in 2017 being the limit of publicised knowledge. The current condition of the Wallis and Futuna Soccer Federation is not known, or even if they are extant, but a youth football association existed as recently as 2020.

== Soccer Federation ==
The Wallis and Futuna Soccer Federation (French: Fédération de Ligue de Football de Wallis et Futuna) is the governing body of soccer in Wallis and Futuna. They oversee the Wallis and Futuna national football team as well as overlooking several competitions on the islands. These leagues include the Futuna Première Division and the Wallis Première Division. Wallis and Futuna is not affiliated with the Oceania Football Confederation (OFC) or FIFA. They have no known phone number, hindering participation in international events.

The current status of the federation is unknown, with the only evidence of football on the islands seeming to be related to a junior football association.
