= Federated States of Micronesia national football team =

National association football team

Federated States of Micronesia
- Nickname: The Four Stars
- Association: Federated States of Micronesia; Football Association (FSMFA)
- Confederation: None
- Head coach: David Johnson
- Top scorer: Peter Paul Igesumai (3)
- Home stadium: Yap Sports Complex
- FIFA code: FSM
First colors	Second colors	Third colors

First international
- Guam 3–0 Federated States of Micronesia (Guam; 1 June 1999)

Biggest win
- Federated States of Micronesia 7–0 Northern Mariana Islands (Yap, Federated States of Micronesia; 12 July 1999)

Biggest defeat
- Federated States of Micronesia 0–18 New Caledonia (Suva, Fiji; 1 July 2003)

Pacific Games
- Appearances: 1 (first in 2003)
- Best result: Group stage (2003)

Micronesian Cup
- Appearances: 1 (first in 1999)
- Best result: Champions (1999)

Federated States of Micronesia men's national football team represents the Federated States of Micronesia in international football, and is controlled by the Federated States of Micronesia Football Association. The team is not a member of FIFA, or a regional confederation, and therefore cannot compete in the World Cup.

== Overview ==
The team has only played a handful of matches, the last in 2003. In 2015, the under-23 team suffered a series of heavy defeats at the Pacific Games, the presence of a side at the tournament was intended to be the first step towards having a more permanent national team with FIFA recognition.

=== 1999 Micronesian Cup ===
In 1999, Yap hosted the Micronesian Cup. This was a three-team tournament consisting of the Northern Mariana Islands, Micronesia and an international team known as the Crusaders (or Crushers according to other sources). On 12 July 1999, Micronesia competed in their first competitive match as they defeated the Northern Mariana Islands, 7–0. The team won their second group match 4–1 against the Crusaders to qualify for the final. Again, they faced Crusaders and Peter Paul Igesumal scored seven times as Micronesia won 14–1 to win the tournament.

== Results history ==
The Federated States of Micronesia's score is shown first in each case.

No.	Date	Venue	Opponents	Score	Competition	FS Micronesia scorers	Att.	Ref.
1	1 June 1999	Guam (A)	Guam	0–3	Friendly		—	
2	June 1999	Guam (A)	Guam	1–4	Friendly	Unknown	—	
3	June 1999	Guam (A)	Guam	0–5	Friendly		—	
4	12 July 1999	Yap (N)	Northern Mariana Islands	7–0	1999 Micronesian Cup	Igesumai (3), Rasug (2), Daniel, Gorong	—	
5	30 June 2003	National Stadium, Suva (N)	Tahiti	0–17	2003 South Pacific Games		—	
6	1 July 2003	National Stadium, Suva (N)	New Caledonia	0–18	2003 South Pacific Games		3,000	
7	5 July 2003	Ratu Cakobau Park, Nausori (N)	Tonga	0–7	2003 South Pacific Games		1,000	
8	7 July 2003	Churchill Park, Lautoka (N)	Papua New Guinea	0–10	2003 South Pacific Games		3,500	

Notes

1. A: Also reported as Crushers.

=== Record by opponent ===
Team	Pld	W	D	L	GF	GA	GD	WPCT
Guam	3	0	0	3	1	12	−11	0.00
New Caledonia	1	0	0	1	0	18	−18	0.00
Northern Mariana Islands	1	1	0	0	7	0	+7	100.00
Papua New Guinea	1	0	0	1	0	10	−10	0.00
Tahiti	1	0	0	1	0	17	−17	0.00
Tonga	1	0	0	1	0	7	−7	0.00
Total	8	1	0	7	8	64	−56	12.50

Source: Results history

== Competitive record ==
=== South Pacific Games record ===
- 1963 to 1995 – Did not enter
- 2003 – Group stage
- 2007 to 2019 – Did not enter

=== Micronesian Cup ===
- 1999 – Champions

== Coaching history ==
- (Israel) Shimon Shenhar (2000–2001)
- (Uganda) Charles Musana (2001–2007)
- (England) Paul Watson (2009–2010)
- (Australia) Stan Foster (2014–2015)
- (England) Chris Smith (2017)
- (United States) David Johnson (2024–)

== Historical kits ==
1999 Home	2001 Home	2003 Home	2024 Home	2024 Away	2024 Third

== See also ==
- Federated States of Micronesia national under-23 football team
