= Football at the 1975 South Pacific Games =

Tournament details
- Host country: Guam
- Dates: 2–9 August
- Teams: 7 (from 1 confederation)

Final positions
- Champions: Tahiti (2nd title)
- Runners-up: New Caledonia
- Third place: Solomon Islands

Tournament statistics
- Matches played: 13
- Goals scored: 56 (4.31 per match)

Football was contested as part of the programme for the 1975 South Pacific Games which was hosted in Tumon, Guam from 1 to 10 August 1975. It was the fifth edition of the men's football tournament at the multi-sport event organised by the Pacific Games Council.

The football tournament began with the first matches of the group stage on 2 August 1975 and ended with the gold medal match on 9 August 1975. Two-time defending champions New Caledonia and Tahiti contested the final in what was a replay of both the 1966 final and the 1969 final. Tahiti defeated New Caledonia 2–1 after extra time to win the gold medal. In the bronze medal match, the Solomon Islands defeated Fiji 3–2.

== Background ==
Football had been part of the South Pacific Games programme following the debut of the men's competition at the inaugural 1963 South Pacific Games in Fiji.

New Caledonia held the record for gold medals having won the football tournament three times. They were the two-time defending champions after defeating the New Hebrides 7–1 in the gold medal match at the 1971 South Pacific Games in Tahiti and Tahiti 2–1 in the gold medal match at the 1969 South Pacific Games in Papua New Guinea.

== Format ==
Seven teams took part in the competition. They were drawn into two single round robin groups – one of four teams and one of three teams. The group winners and runners-up would contest the semi-finals which would decide the teams contesting the gold and bronze medal matches.

=== Participants ===
- Fiji
- Guam (host)
- (France) New Caledonia
- New Hebrides
- Papua New Guinea
- Solomon Islands
- Tahiti

== Group stage ==
=== Group 1 ===
New Caledonia won the group to progress to the semi-finals alongside Tahiti.

Team	Pts	Pld	W	D	L	GF	GA	GD
New Caledonia	6	3	3	0	0	11	2	+9
Tahiti	4	3	2	0	1	7	5	+2
New Hebrides	2	3	1	0	2	4	6	–2
Papua New Guinea	0	3	0	0	3	3	12	–9

2 August 1975

Tahiti	0–3	New Caledonia

Guam

2 August 1975

Tahiti	3–0	New Hebrides

Guam

4 August 1975

Tahiti	4–2	Papua New Guinea

Guam

4 August 1975

Papua New Guinea	1–5	New Caledonia

Guam

5 August 1975

New Caledonia	3–1	New Hebrides

Guam

5 August 1975

New Hebrides	3–0	Papua New Guinea

Guam

=== Group 2 ===
Fiji won the group to progress to the semi-finals alongside the Solomon Islands.

Team	Pts	Pld	W	D	L	GF	GA	GD
Fiji	3	2	1	1	0	12	1	+11
Solomon Islands	3	2	1	1	0	6	2	+4
Guam	0	2	0	0	2	1	16	–15

2 August 1975

Fiji	11–0	Guam

Guam

4 August 1975

Fiji	1–1	Solomon Islands

Guam

5 August 1975

Solomon Islands	5–1	Guam

Guam

== Semi-finals ==
New Caledonia defeated the Solomon Islands and Tahiti defeated Fiji in the semi-finals.

7 August 1975

New Caledonia	4–0	Solomon Islands

Guam

7 August 1975

Tahiti	3–0	Fiji

Guam

== Bronze medal match ==
The Solomon Islands defeated Fiji to win the bronze medal.

8 August 1975

Fiji	2–3	Solomon Islands

Guam

== Gold medal match ==
Tahiti defeated New Caledonia to win the gold medal.

9 August 1975

New Caledonia	1–2 (a.e.t.)	Tahiti

Guam
