= Football at the 2011 Pacific Games =

Football at the XIV Pacific Games
- Dates: 27 August to 9 September 2011
- Host city: Noumea, New Caledonia
- Level: Senior
- Events: 2
- Participation: 10 nations

Football at the 2011 Pacific Games was held from 27 August to 9 September 2011 at several venues with tournaments for men's and women's teams.

The men's tournament was intended to be part of the Qualification in Oceania for the 2014 FIFA World Cup, however the format was amended in June 2011 and the Pacific Games are no longer a part of the qualification process.

== Events ==
=== Medal table ===
Rank	Nation	Gold	Silver	Bronze	Total
1	New Caledonia	1	1	0	2
2	Papua New Guinea	1	0	0	1
3	Solomon Islands	0	1	0	1
4	Fiji	0	0	1	1
4	French Polynesia (TAH)	0	0	1	1
Totals (5 entries)		2	2	2	6

=== Medal summary ===
Event	Gold	Silver	Bronze
Men	New Caledonia	Solomon Islands	Tahiti
Women	Papua New Guinea	New Caledonia	Fiji
