= Félix Tagawa =

Tahitian footballer (born 1976)

Personal information
- Full name: Félix Tagawa
- Date of birth: 23 March 1976 (age 50)
- Place of birth: Tahiti
- Position: Striker

Team information
- Current team: New Caledonia (manager)

Senior career*
Years	Team	Apps	(Gls)
1999–2003	AS Vénus		
2003	Brisbane Strikers FC	3	(1)
2003	Adelaide United	0	(0)
2004–2008	AS Dragon		

International career^{‡}
2000–2004	Tahiti	22	(14)

Managerial career
- 2013–2026: Hienghène Sport
- 2026–: New Caledonia
Medal record
Men's football
Representing Tahiti
OFC Nations Cup
Third place	2002 New Zealand
- * Club domestic league appearances and goals as of 20 March 2012 ‡ National team caps and goals as of 20 March 2012

Félix Tagawa (born 23 March 1976) is a retired footballer who played as a striker. He last played for AS Dragon in the Tahiti Division Fédérale. He is the current manager of the New Caledonia national football team.

== International goals ==
Fiji score listed first, score column indicates score after each Tagawa goal

International goals by date, venue, cap, opponent, score, result and competition
No.	Date	Venue	Opponent	Score	Result	Competition
1	4 June 2001	North Harbour Stadium, Albany, New Zealand	Vanuatu	6–1	6–1	2002 FIFA World Cup Qualification
2	11 June 2001	North Harbour Stadium, Albany, New Zealand	Cook Islands	2–0	6–0	2002 FIFA World Cup Qualification
3	11 June 2001	North Harbour Stadium, Albany, New Zealand	Cook Islands	5–0	6–0	2002 FIFA World Cup Qualification
4	11 June 2001	North Harbour Stadium, Albany, New Zealand	Cook Islands	6–0	6–0	2002 FIFA World Cup Qualification
5	7 July 2002	North Harbour Stadium, Albany, New Zealand	Samoa	2–2	3–2	2002 OFC Nations Cup
6	9 July 2002	North Harbour Stadium, Albany, New Zealand	Papua New Guinea	2–1	3–1	2002 OFC Nations Cup
7	9 July 2002	North Harbour Stadium, Albany, New Zealand	Papua New Guinea	3–1	3–1	2002 OFC Nations Cup
8	30 June 2003	National Stadium, Suva, Fiji	Federated States of Micronesia	1–0	17–0	2003 South Pacific Games
9	30 June 2003	National Stadium, Suva, Fiji	Federated States of Micronesia	2–0	17–0	2003 South Pacific Games
10	30 June 2003	National Stadium, Suva, Fiji	Federated States of Micronesia	4–0	17–0	2003 South Pacific Games
11	30 June 2003	National Stadium, Suva, Fiji	Federated States of Micronesia	6–0	17–0	2003 South Pacific Games
12	30 July 2003	National Stadium, Suva, Fiji	Papua New Guinea	2–0	3–0	2003 South Pacific Games
13	7 July 2003	Churchill Park, Lautoka, Fiji	Tonga	1–0	4–0	2003 South Pacific Games
14	7 July 2003	Churchill Park, Lautoka, Fiji	Tonga	2–0	4–0	2003 South Pacific Games

== Honours ==
Tahiti

- OFC Nations Cup: 3rd place 2002
