= Michel Clarque =

New Caledonian footballer and manager

Personal information
- Place of birth: New Caledonia
- Position: Goalkeeper

International career
Years	Team	Apps	(Gls)
- New Caledonia

Managerial career
- 2002: New Caledonia
- 20xx–: Hienghène Sport

Michel Clarque is a New Caledonian professional football manager. He plays as a goalkeeper for the New Caledonia national football team. In 2002, he coached the New Caledonia national football team. Currently he is a coach of the Hienghène Sport.

== Honours ==
- New Caledonia Cup: 1

2013
