= New Caledonia national football team =

New Caledonia
- Nickname: Les Cagous (The Kagus)
- Association: Fédération Calédonienne de Football (FCF)
- Confederation: OFC (Oceania)
- Head coach: Felix Tagawa
- Captain: César Zeoula
- Most caps: César Zeoula (47)
- Top scorer: Bertrand Kaï (23)
- Home stadium: Stade Numa-Daly Magenta
- FIFA code: NCL
First colours	Second colours

FIFA ranking
- Current: 156 ▼5 (7 October 2026)
- Highest: 93 (August 2013)
- Lowest: 191 (April–May 2016)

First international
- New Caledonia 2–0 New Zealand (Nouméa, New Caledonia; 19 September 1951)

Biggest win
- New Caledonia 18–0 Guam (Lae, Papua New Guinea; 3 September 1991); Federated States of Micronesia 0–18 New Caledonia (Suva, Fiji; 1 July 2003)

Biggest defeat
- Australia 11–0 New Caledonia (Auckland, New Zealand; 8 July 2002)

World Cup
- Appearances: 0

OFC Nations Cup
- Appearances: 6 (first in 1973)
- Best result: Runners-up (2008, 2012)

Melanesia Cup / MSG Prime Minister's Cup
- Appearances: 9 (first in 1988)
- Best result: Melanesia Cup: Runners-up (1988, 1989, 1990, 1992); MSG Prime Minister's Cup: Runners-up (2023)
Medal record
Men's football
OFC Nations Cup
Runner-up	2008 Oceania
Runner-up	2012 Solomon Islands
Third place	1973 New Zealand
Third place	1980 New Caledonia
Pacific Games
Gold medal – first place	1963 Fiji
Gold medal – first place	1969 Papua New Guinea
Gold medal – first place	1971 Tahiti
Gold medal – first place	1987 New Caledonia
Gold medal – first place	2007 Samoa
Gold medal – first place	2011 New Caledonia
Gold medal – first place	2023 Solomon Islands
Silver medal – second place	1966 New Caledonia
Silver medal – second place	1975 Guam
Silver medal – second place	2003 Fiji
Silver medal – second place	2019 Samoa
Bronze medal – third place	1983 Western Samoa
Bronze medal – third place	1991 Papua New Guinea
Pacific Mini Games
Silver medal – second place	1981 Solomon Islands
Melanesian Cup/MSG Prime Minister's Cup
Runner-up	1989 Fiji
Runner-up	1990 Vanuatu
Runner-up	1992 Vanuatu
Runner-up	2023 New Caledonia

The New Caledonia men's national football team (French: équipe de Nouvelle-Calédonie de football), nicknamed Les Cagous (transl. "The Kagus"), is the national team of New Caledonia; it is controlled by the Fédération Calédonienne de Football. Although they were only admitted to FIFA in 2004, they have been participating in the OFC Nations Cup since its inception. They have been one of this relatively small region's strongest teams, finishing second in 2008 and 2012, and third in 1973 and 1980. They were the top ranked OFC nation at number 95 in September 2008, making them only the fourth country from the confederation to have reached the global top 100.

== History ==
The New Caledonian Football Federation, although created in 1928, did not join FIFA or the OFC until 2004, becoming the 205th member of the former.

Previously, the New Caledonian selection, due to the attachment of local institutions to the French Football Federation, could only line up during friendly matches or regional competitions, such as the Pacific Games, as well as the Oceania Football Cup, but only as a guest.

The Cagous distinguished themselves during these competitions, winning the Pacific Games on several occasions, and finishing in third place during the first two editions of the OFC Nations Cup.

After failing to qualify for the 2004 OFC Nations Cup, the New Caledonian Football Federation hired Didier Chambaron as the team's new coach. During the 2007 South Pacific Games in Apia, the Cagous were placed in group A and won over their great rival Tahiti (1–0); this meeting was the first of the playoffs for the 2010 FIFA World Cup. They then won against Tuvalu and the Cook Islands (1–0) and (3–0). For their last group match, they drew against Fiji (1–1). The New Caledonians finished second in their group, then beat the Solomon Islands (3–2), and in the final won the trophy against Fiji (1–0).

The Pacific Games football tournament served as the first qualifying round for the World Cup in South Africa; the team found themselves qualified for the second round, where New Zealand blocked their way by taking first place. The Cagous however finished second behind Fiji and Vanuatu.

In May 2011, the selection faced Reunion twice in Nouméa, matches counting for the preparation of the games of the islands of the Indian Ocean in the Seychelles of the Reunionese. The New Caledonians lost both matches. However, a few months later, during the 2011 Pacific Games, New Caledonia won in the final against the Solomon Islands, with the score of (2–0), after a victory against Tahiti (3–1).

In June 2012, on the occasion of the OFC Nations Cup, the Cagous succeeded in beating New Zealand in the semi-finals, with a score of 2–0 (goals from Bertrand Kai and Georges Gope-Fenepej), but failed in the final against their Tahitian rivals (1–0). Nevertheless, the competition served as a second qualifying round for the 2014 FIFA World Cup; N ew Caledonia, along with Tahiti and the semi-finalists New Zealand and the Solomon Islands, qualified for the next round.

New Caledonia achieved their best-ever FIFA World Cup qualification campaign during qualification for the 2026 FIFA World Cup. After finishing top of their group in the second round of OFC qualifying, they defeated Tahiti 3–0 in the third-round semi-final before losing 3–0 to New Zealand in the OFC final. As runners-up, New Caledonia advanced to the FIFA Play-Off Tournament.

Their qualification for the Play-Off Tournament marked the first time a Melanesian nation had reached an inter-confederation play-off for the FIFA World Cup. New Caledonia were drawn against Jamaica in the Path A semi-final, played at Guadalajara Stadium in Guadalajara, Mexico, on 26 March 2026. Jamaica won 1–0, with Bailey Cadamarteri scoring the only goal in the 18th minute, ending New Caledonia's hopes of qualifying for their first FIFA World Cup.

== Rivalries ==
A historical sporting rivalry exists between the two French Pacific overseas collectivities, New Caledonia and Tahiti. They compete regularly in regional and, since 2006, international competitions. In 2012, Tahiti led in titles won (1 OFC Nations Cup, 5 gold medals at the South Pacific Games, 2 at the South Pacific mini-games, against 6 gold at the South Pacific Games for New Caledonia). As of their last match in 2018, out of the 62 matches played since 1953, New Caledonia has 28 wins against 25 for Tahiti and 9 draws.

== Kit ==
Macron has been the current kit provider for the national team since 2025. As of 2012, the national team's home kit is a grey jersey with red shorts and red socks. The away kit is a red jersey with red shorts and white socks.

Kit supplier	Period
(Germany) Puma	2004–2006
(United States) Nike	2010–2012
(Italy) Erreà	2013–2017
(Italy) Kappa	2017–2019
(Denmark) Select	2020–2021
(Italy) Givova	2022–2025
(Italy) Macron	2025–

== Results and fixtures ==
The following is a list of match results in the last 12 months, as well as any future matches that have been scheduled.

Win Draw Loss Fixture

=== 2026 ===
4 January Hybrid match	USSA Vertou	1–3	New Caledonia	Vertou, France
19:00	Aboubacar Sadio 70'	Report	L. Waya 31', 57', 67'	Stadium: Stade des Échalonnières

26 March 2026 FIFA World Cup inter-confederation play-offs	New Caledonia	0–1	Jamaica	Guadalajara, Mexico
21:00 UTC−6		Report	Cadamarteri 18'	Stadium: Estadio Akron; Attendance: 40,983; Referee: Gustavo Tejera (Uruguay)

21 September 2026 MSG Prime Minister's Cup	New Caledonia	0–2	Solomon Islands	Suva, Fiji
			Rafa Le’ai 76' Javin Wae 90+3'	Stadium: HFC Bank Stadium

24 September 2026 MSG Prime Minister's Cup	Papua New Guinea	v	New Caledonia	Suva, Fiji
				Stadium: HFC Bank Stadium

27 September 2026 MSG Prime Minister's Cup	Vanuatu	v	New Caledonia	Suva, Fiji
				Stadium: HFC Bank Stadium

30 September 2026 MSG Prime Minister's Cup	Fiji	v	New Caledonia	Suva, Fiji
				Stadium: HFC Bank Stadium

== Coaching history ==
- (France) Guy Elmour (1971–1973)
- (France) Jules Hmeune (1977)
- (West Germany) Rudi Gutendorf (1981)
- (New Caledonia) Jacques Zimako (Note: New Caledonia sporting nationality. At the time, no other flag other than the French flag was used) (1995)
- (France) Michel Clarque (2002)
- (France) Serge Martinengo de Novack (2002–2004)
- (France) Didier Chambaron (2007–2010)
- (France) Christophe Coursimault (2010–2012)
- (France) Alain Moizan (2012–2015)
- (France) Thierry Sardo (2015–2021)
- (New Caledonia) Dominique Wacalie (2021–2022)
- (France) Johann Sidaner (2022–2026)
- (French Polynesia) Felix Tagawa (2026-present)

== Players ==
=== Current squad ===
The following 18 players were called up for the 2026 MSG Prime Minister's Cup.
Caps and goals correct as of 21 September 2026, after the match against Solomon Islands.

No.	Pos.	Player	Date of birth (age)	Caps	Goals	Club
1	GK	Mickaël Ulile	16 July 1997 (age 29)	17	0	(New Caledonian Football Federation) Gaïca
13	GK	Jean-Gilles Hnamuko	2 March 1996 (age 30)	2	0	(New Caledonian Football Federation) UNC
16	GK	Jean-Pierre Wélépane		0	0	(New Caledonian Football Federation) Magenta
3	DF	Fabrice Iopue	3 March 2008 (age 18)	1	0	(New Caledonian Football Federation) Magenta
4	DF	Timotei Zeter	12 December 2006 (age 19)	1	0	(New Caledonian Football Federation) Hienghène Sport
5	DF	Neil Wahiobe	12 June 2000 (age 26)	1	0	(New Caledonian Football Federation) Gaïca
8	DF	Gregory Diko	25 February 2007 (age 19)	1	0	(New Caledonian Football Federation) Lössi
18	DF	Sipane Qaeze	23 April 2007 (age 19)	1	0	(New Caledonian Football Federation) Gaïca
2	MF	Aymard Tidjite		1	0	(New Caledonian Football Federation) Hienghène Sport
6	MF	Kandjo Teanyouen	25 June 2005 (age 21)	1	0	(New Caledonian Football Federation) Hienghène Sport
10	MF	Brice Dahite	21 June 1991 (age 35)	12	1	(New Caledonian Football Federation) Hienghène Sport
12	MF	Djibril Tufele	25 January 2003 (age 23)	3	0	(New Caledonian Football Federation) Lössi
14	MF	Cédric Décoiré	15 May 1994 (age 32)	12	3	(New Caledonian Football Federation) Saint-Louis
17	MF	Jemmanuel Siwoine	20 September 2008 (age 18)	0	0	(New Caledonian Football Federation) Lössi
7	FW	Stéphane Wahaga	21 June 1991 (age 35)	1	0	(New Caledonian Football Federation) Hienghène Sport
9	FW	Willy Read	11 January 2003 (age 23)	7	1	(New Caledonian Football Federation) Tiga Sport
11	FW	Roan Thale		1	0	(New Caledonian Football Federation) Emo Biloup
15	FW	Pierre Iékawé	7 September 1997 (age 29)	2	0	(New Caledonian Football Federation) Tiga Sport

=== Recent call-ups ===
The following players have also been called up to the New Caledonia squad within the last twelve months.

Pos.	Player	Date of birth (age)	Caps	Goals	Club	Latest call-up
GK	Rocky Nyikeine	26 May 1992 (age 34)	33	0	(New Caledonia) Gaïca	v. Jamaica, 26 March 2026
GK	Thomas Schmidt	4 June 1996 (age 30)	5	0	(New Caledonia) Tiga Sport	v. Jamaica, 26 March 2026
DF	Bernard Iwa	16 May 2000 (age 26)	13	0	(New Caledonia) Lössi	v. Jamaica, 26 March 2026
DF	Henri Wélépane	19 April 2000 (age 26)	0	0	(New Caledonia) Tiga Sport	v. Jamaica, 26 March 2026
DF	Fonzy Ranchain	22 July 1994 (age 32)	13	0	(France) Vertou	v. Jamaica, 26 March 2026
DF	Morgan Mathelon	12 September 1991 (age 35)	17	0	(New Caledonia) Tiga Sport	v. Jamaica, 26 March 2026
DF	Didier Simane	3 August 1996 (age 30)	9	0	(France) ASPTT Dijon	v. Jamaica, 26 March 2026
DF	Joseph Athale	11 July 1995 (age 31)	23	3	(French Polynesia) Tahiti United	v. Jamaica, 26 March 2026
DF	William Rokuad	3 October 2001 (age 25)	7	1	(France) Normanville	v. Jamaica, 26 March 2026
MF	Pierre Bako	9 August 2001 (age 25)	6	0	(France) Vertou	v. Jamaica, 26 March 2026
MF	Jekob Jeno	22 June 2000 (age 26)	8	0	(Israel) Hapoel Rishon LeZion	v. Jamaica, 26 March 2026
MF	Joris Kenon	29 January 1998 (age 28)	8	0	(France) Saint-Philbert-de-Grand-Lieu	v. Jamaica, 26 March 2026
MF	César Zeoula (captain)	29 August 1989 (age 37)	47	13	(France) Chauvigny	v. Jamaica, 26 March 2026
MF	Shene Wélépane	9 December 1997 (age 28)	24	6	(New Caledonia) Tiga Sport	v. Jamaica, 26 March 2026
MF	Yoan Béaruné	22 March 2002 (age 24)	3	0	(New Caledonia) Horizon Patho	v. Jamaica, 26 March 2026
MF	Titouan Richard	4 December 2000 (age 25)	7	0	(France) Olympique Salaise Rhodia	v. Jamaica, 26 March 2026
MF	Angelo Fulgini	20 August 1996 (age 30)	1	0	(Saudi Arabia) Al-Khaleej	v. Jamaica, 26 March 2026
MF	David Béaruné	17 June 1994 (age 32)	3	0	(New Caledonia) Tiga Sport	v. Jamaica, 26 March 2026
FW	Jean-Jacques Katrawa	2 August 1999 (age 27)	13	5	(France) Lucciana	v. Jamaica, 26 March 2026
FW	Georges Gope-Fenepej	23 October 1988 (age 38)	27	18	(France) Saint-Colomban Locminé	v. Jamaica, 26 March 2026
FW	Lues Waya	1 August 2001 (age 25)	8	8	(France) Vertou	v. Jamaica, 26 March 2026
FW	Gérard Waia	22 December 2004 (age 21)	11	2	(France) Vertou	v. Jamaica, 26 March 2026
FW	Germain Haewegene	13 July 1996 (age 30)	8	2	(French Polynesia) Tahiti United	v. Jamaica, 26 March 2026
FW	Bryan Ausu	25 November 1997 (age 28)	2	0	(France) Sud	v. Jamaica, 26 March 2026

Notes

- ^{INJ} Withdrew due to injury
- ^{PRE} Preliminary squad / standby
- ^{WD} Withdrew due to non-injury issue

== Player records ==
As of 26 March 2026
Players in bold are still active with New Caledonia.

=== Most appearances ===
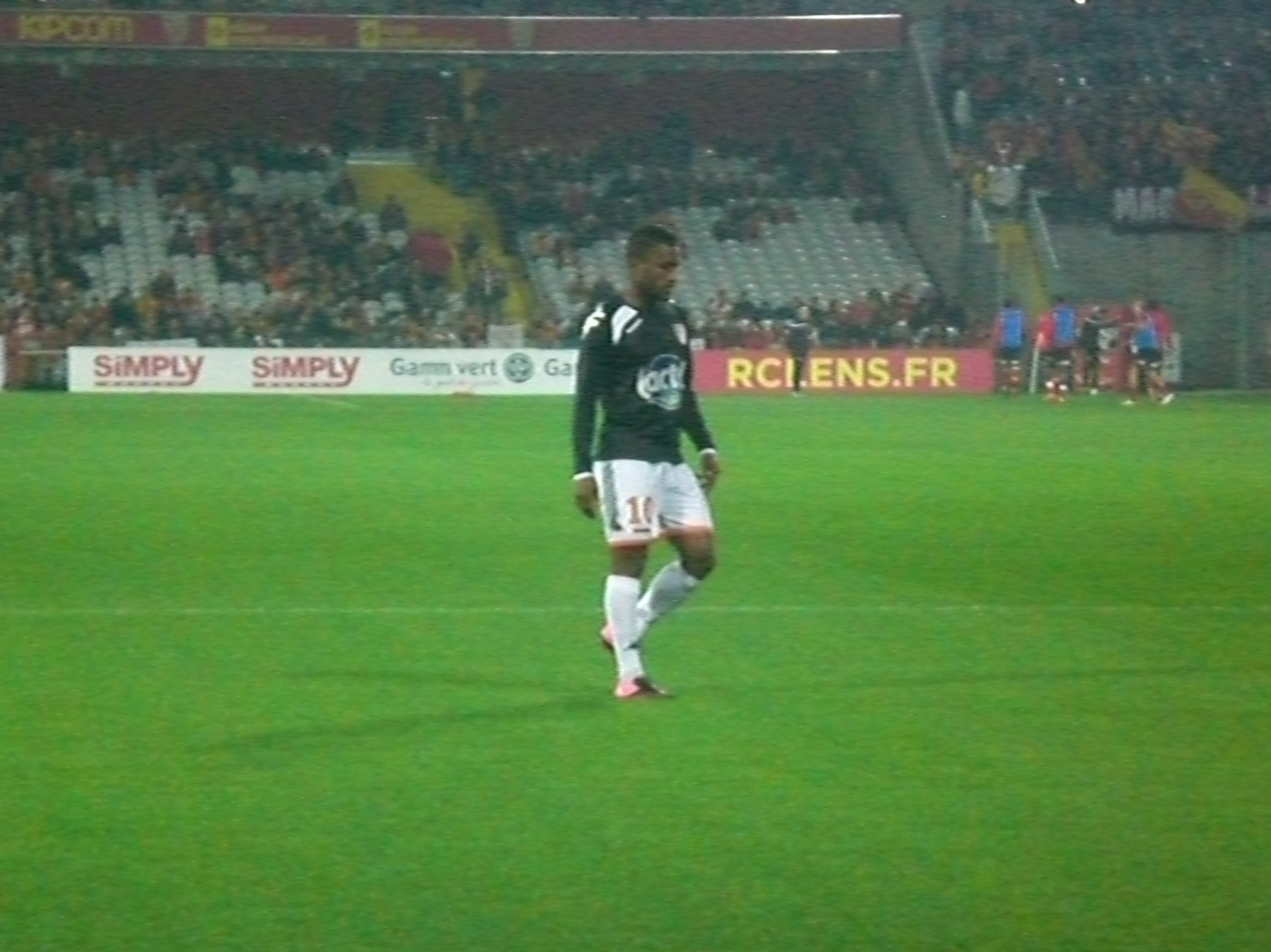
César Zeoula is the most capped player of the national team.

Rank	Name	Caps	Goals	Career
1	**César Zeoula**	47	13	2008–present
2	Bertrand Kaï	43	23	2008–2022
3	**Emile Béaruné**	42	0	2010–present
4	Pierre Wajoka	39	13	2003–2011
4	Joël Wakanumuné	39	1	2011–2022
6	Iamel Kabeu	34	20	2002–2013
7	**Rocky Nyikeine**	33	0	2011–present
8	Roy Kayara	31	8	2008–2019
9	Michel Hmaé	28	22	2003–2011
10	André Sinédo	27	1	2002–2011
10	**Georges Gope-Fenepej**	27	18	2011–present

=== Top goalscorers ===
Rank	Name	Goals	Caps	Ratio	Career
1	Bertrand Kaï	23	43	0.53	2008–2022
2	Michel Hmaé	22	28	0.79	2003–2011
3	Iamel Kabeu	20	34	0.59	2002–2013
4	**Georges Gope-Fenepej**	18	27	0.67	2011–present
5	Pierre Wajoka	13	39	0.33	2003–2011
5	**César Zeoula**	13	47	0.28	2008–present
7	Jean-Philippe Saïko	12	10	1.2	2016–2022
8	Joris Pibke	11	5	2.2	2000–2002
9	Paul Poatinda	10	10	1	2003–2004
10	Jacques Haeko	9	13	0.69	2011–2012

== Competitive record ==
=== FIFA World Cup ===
FIFA World Cup record									Qualification record						
Year	Round	Position	Pld	W	D*	L	GF	GA	Pos.	Pld	W	D	L	GF	GA
(Uruguay) 1930	Not member of FIFA								Not member of FIFA						
(Italy) 1934	Not member of FIFA								Not member of FIFA						
(France) 1938	Not member of FIFA								Not member of FIFA						
(Brazil) 1950	Not member of FIFA								Not member of FIFA						
(Switzerland) 1954	Not member of FIFA								Not member of FIFA						
(Sweden) 1958	Not member of FIFA								Not member of FIFA						
(Chile) 1962	Not member of FIFA								Not member of FIFA						
(England) 1966	Not member of FIFA								Not member of FIFA						
(Mexico) 1970	Not member of FIFA								Not member of FIFA						
(West Germany) 1974	Not member of FIFA								Not member of FIFA						
(Argentina) 1978	Not member of FIFA								Not member of FIFA						
(Spain) 1982	Not member of FIFA								Not member of FIFA						
(Mexico) 1986	Not member of FIFA								Not member of FIFA						
(Italy) 1990	Not member of FIFA								Not member of FIFA						
(United States) 1994	Not member of FIFA								Not member of FIFA						
(France) 1998	Not member of FIFA								Not member of FIFA						
(South Korea) (Japan) 2002	Not member of FIFA								Not member of FIFA						
(Germany) 2006	Did not qualify								3rd	4	2	1	1	16	2
(South Africa) 2010	Did not qualify								2nd	12	7	3	2	22	13
(Brazil) 2014	Did not qualify								2nd	11	7	0	4	36	13
(Russia) 2018	Did not qualify								2nd	8	2	4	2	13	8
(Qatar) 2022	Did not qualify								4th	3	0	0	3	2	10
(Canada) (Mexico) (United States) 2026	Did not qualify								2nd (PO)	6	3	1	2	10	8
(Morocco) (Portugal) (Spain) 2030	To be determined								To be determined						
(Saudi Arabia) 2034	To be determined								To be determined						
Total		0/5	–	–	–	–	–	–	—	44	21	9	14	99	54

FIFA World Cup qualification History
Year	Round	H/A/N	Score	Result
2006	Group 1	N	New Caledonia 0 – 0 Tahiti	Draw
2006	Group 1	A	New Caledonia 0 – 2 Solomon Islands	Loss
2006	Group 1	N	New Caledonia 8 – 0 Cook Islands	Win
2006	Group 1	N	New Caledonia 8 – 0 Tonga	Win
2010	South Pacific Games	N	New Caledonia 1 – 0 Tahiti	Win
2010	South Pacific Games	N	New Caledonia 1 – 0 Tuvalu	Win
2010	South Pacific Games	N	New Caledonia 3 – 0 Cook Islands	Win
2010	South Pacific Games	N	New Caledonia 1 – 1 Fiji	Draw
2010	South Pacific Games	N	New Caledonia 3 – 2 Solomon Islands	Win
2010	South Pacific Games	N	New Caledonia 1 – 0 Fiji	Win
2010	OFC Nations Cup	A	New Caledonia 3 – 3 Fiji	Draw
2010	OFC Nations Cup	H	New Caledonia 4 – 0 Fiji	Win
2010	OFC Nations Cup	A	New Caledonia 1 – 1 Vanuatu	Draw
2010	OFC Nations Cup	H	New Caledonia 3 – 0 Vanuatu	Win
2010	OFC Nations Cup	H	New Caledonia 1 – 3 New Zealand	Loss
2010	OFC Nations Cup	A	New Caledonia 0 – 3 New Zealand	Loss
2014	OFC Nations Cup	N	New Caledonia 5 – 2 Vanuatu	Win
2014	OFC Nations Cup	N	New Caledonia 3 – 4 Tahiti	Loss
2014	OFC Nations Cup	N	New Caledonia 9 – 0 Samoa	Win
2014	Third Round	H	New Caledonia 0 – 2 New Zealand	Loss
2014	Third Round	A	New Caledonia 4 – 0 Tahiti	Win
2014	Third Round	A	New Caledonia 6 – 2 Solomon Islands	Win
2014	Third Round	H	New Caledonia 5 – 0 Solomon Islands	Win
2014	Third Round	A	New Caledonia 1 – 2 New Zealand	Loss
2014	Third Round	H	New Caledonia 1 – 0 Tahiti	Win
2018	OFC Nations Cup	N	New Caledonia 1 – 1 Papua New Guinea	Draw
2018	OFC Nations Cup	N	New Caledonia 7 – 0 Samoa	Win
2018	OFC Nations Cup	N	New Caledonia 1 – 1 Tahiti	Draw
2018	Third Round	A	New Caledonia 0 – 2 New Zealand	Loss
2018	Third Round	H	New Caledonia 0 – 0 New Zealand	Draw
2018	Third Round	A	New Caledonia 2 – 2 Fiji	Draw
2018	Third Round	H	New Caledonia 2 – 1 New Zealand	Draw
2022	Group Stage	N	New Caledonia 1 – 2 Fiji	Loss
2022	Group Stage	N	New Caledonia 0 – 1 Papua New Guinea	Loss
2022	Group Stage	N	New Caledonia 1 – 7 New Zealand	Loss
2026	Second Round	N	New Caledonia 3 – 1 Papua New Guinea	Win
2026	Second Round	N	New Caledonia 2 – 3 Solomon Islands	Win
2026	Second Round	N	New Caledonia 1 – 1 Fiji	Draw

=== OFC Nations Cup ===
Oceania Cup / OFC Nations Cup record									Qualification record					
Year	Round	Position	Pld	W	D	L	GF	GA	Pld	W	D	L	GF	GA
(New Zealand) 1973	Third place	3rd	5	3	0	2	10	6	No qualification					
(New Caledonia) 1980	Third place	3rd	4	3	0	1	14	12	No qualification					
1996	Did not qualify								4	1	0	3	5	9
(Australia) 1998	Did not qualify								4	0	0	4	4	10
(French Polynesia) 2000	Did not qualify								4	2	0	2	11	11
(New Zealand) 2002	Group stage	8th	3	0	0	3	1	14	4	3	0	1	25	4
(Australia) 2004	Did not qualify								4	2	1	1	16	2
2008	Runners-up	2nd	6	2	2	2	12	10	6	5	1	0	10	3
(Solomon Islands) 2012	Runners-up	2nd	5	3	0	2	19	7	Qualified automatically					
(Papua New Guinea) 2016	Semi-finals	3rd	4	1	2	1	9	3	Qualified automatically					
(Fiji) (Vanuatu) 2024	Qualified but withdrew								Qualified automatically					
Total	Runners-up	6/11	27	12	4	11	65	52	26	13	2	11	71	39

=== Pacific Games ===
Pacific Games record
Year	Host	Round	Pld	W	D*	L	GF	GA
1963	Fiji	Gold medal	2	2	0	0	10	3
1966	New Caledonia	Silver medal	4	3	0	1	17	2
1969	Papua New Guinea	Gold medal	5	4	1	0	20	3
1971	Tahiti	Gold medal	4	3	1	0	12	2
1975	Guam	Silver medal	5	4	0	1	16	4
1979	Fiji	Fourth place	5	3	0	2	26	8
1983	Samoa	Bronze medal	6	4	0	2	16	11
1987	New Caledonia	Gold medal	6	5	0	1	26	4
1991	Papua New Guinea	Bronze medal	5	3	0	2	13	8
1995	Tahiti	Group stage	4	2	0	2	19	3
2003	Fiji	Silver medal	6	4	1	1	29	3
2007	Samoa	Gold medal	6	5	1	0	10	3
2011	New Caledonia	Gold medal	7	6	0	1	36	3
2015	Papua New Guinea	See New Caledonia national under-23 football team						
2019	Samoa	Silver medal	6	5	0	1	23	2
2023	Solomon Islands	Gold medal	4	3	1	0	18	2
Total		8 titles	69	52	5	13	268	59

=== MSG Prime Minister's Cup ===
MSG Prime Minister's Cup record
Year	Host	Position	Pld	W	D*	L	GF	GA
1988	Solomon Islands	Fourth place	4	1	0	3	6	5
1989	Fiji	Runners-up	4	3	0	1	9	5
1990	Vanuatu	Runners-up	4	2	1	1	5	3
1992	Vanuatu	Runners-up	3	2	1	0	4	2
1994	Solomon Islands	Fourth place	4	1	0	3	5	9
1998	Vanuatu	Fifth place	4	0	0	4	4	10
2000	Fiji	Fourth place	4	2	0	2	11	11
2022	Vanuatu	Sixth place	2	0	0	2	0	2
2023	New Caledonia	Runners-up	3	2	0	1	7	2
2024	Solomon Islands	Withdrew						
Total		Runners-up	32	13	2	17	51	49

== Head-to-head record ==
Up to matches played on 30 September 2026.

Team	Pld	W	D	L	GF	GA	GD	WPCT
American Samoa	4	4	0	0	33	0	+33	100.00
Australia	4	0	0	4	1	23	−22	0.00
Bulgaria	1	0	0	1	3	5	−2	0.00
Cook Islands	5	5	0	0	40	0	+40	100.00
Estonia	1	0	1	0	1	1	0	0.00
Fiji	40	12	6	22	70	78	−8	30.00
Gibraltar	1	1	0	0	2	0	+2	100.00
Guadeloupe	2	0	1	1	1	5	−4	0.00
Guam	3	3	0	0	37	1	+36	100.00
Jamaica	1	0	0	1	0	1	−1	0.00
Malaysia	1	0	0	1	1	2	−1	0.00
Martinique	3	0	1	2	1	7	−6	0.00
Mauritius	1	0	0	1	1	3	−2	0.00
Mayotte	2	1	0	1	3	4	−1	50.00
Federated States of Micronesia	1	1	0	0	18	0	+18	100.00
New Zealand	34	11	2	21	46	74	−28	32.35
Papua New Guinea	21	15	2	4	57	19	+38	71.43
Réunion	2	0	0	2	3	7	−4	0.00
Saint Pierre and Miquelon	1	1	0	0	16	1	+15	100.00
Samoa (Note: Includes results as Western Samoa.)	4	4	0	0	29	0	+29	100.00
Solomon Islands	29	15	3	11	58	35	+23	51.72
Tahiti	65	28	14	23	111	78	+33	43.08
Tonga	6	6	0	0	43	2	+41	100.00
Tuvalu	5	4	0	1	32	2	+30	80.00
Vanuatu (Note: Includes results as New Hebrides.)	40	25	7	8	102	45	+57	62.50
Wallis and Futuna	3	3	0	0	19	1	+18	100.00
Total	280	139	37	104	728	394	+334	49.64

Source: 1951–99 results and 2000–present results

== Honours ==
=== Continental ===
- OFC Nations Cup
  - (silver) Runners-up (2): 2008, 2012
  - (bronze) Third place (2): 1973, 1980

=== Subcontinental ===
- Pacific Games
  - (gold) Gold medal (7): 1963, 1969, 1971, 1987, 2007, 2011, 2023
  - (silver) Silver medal (4): 1966, 1987, 2003, 2019
  - (bronze) Bronze medal (2): 1983, 1991
- Pacific Mini Games
  - (silver) Silver medal (1): 1981
  - (bronze) Bronze medal (1): 1993
- Melanesia Cup / MSG Prime Minister's Cup
  - (silver) Runner-up (4): 1989, 1990, 1992, 2023

=== Summary ===
Including honours in competitions directly organized/recognized by FIFA or an affiliated confederation.

Competition	1st place, gold medalist(s)	2nd place, silver medalist(s)	3rd place, bronze medalist(s)	Total
OFC Nations Cup	0	2	2	4
Total	0	2	2	4

== Historical kits ==
1987 Home	1998 Home	2002 Home	2003 Home	2003 Away	2004 Third	2006 Home	2006 Away

2007 Home	2007 Away	2008 Home	2010 Home	2011	2012 Home	2012 Away	2016 Home

2016 Away	2017 Home	2019	2019	2019	2019	2022	2022

2022	2022	2022
