= Football at the 1987 South Pacific Games =

Men's Football at the 1987 South Pacific Games
Tournament details
- Host country: New Caledonia
- Dates: 9–19 December
- Teams: 6 (from 1 confederation)

Final positions
- Champions: New Caledonia (4th title)
- Runners-up: Tahiti
- Third place: Papua New Guinea

Tournament statistics
- Matches played: 16
- Goals scored: 85 (5.31 per match)

Football was contested as part of the programme for the 1987 South Pacific Games which was hosted in New Caledonia. It was the eighth edition of the men's football tournament at the multi-sport event organised by the Pacific Games Council.

== Background ==
The first men's football tournament was held at the inaugural games in 1963 held in Suva, Fiji and was regularly held up until the games before this edition, which were the 1983 South Pacific Games in Western Samoa. New Caledonia has won three titles in the tournament up while French Polynesia had won the tournament at the 1966 South Pacific Games in Nouméa. The French Polynesian team would later use the name Tahiti and won the three previous competitions consecutively.

== Format ==
Six teams took part in the competition. They were drawn into one round robin group, where the top two placed teams would advance to the finals, the third and fourth would advance to the bronze medal match, and the two last placed teams would not compete in another match in the tournament. The competition would be held from 9 to 19 December 1987.

=== Participants ===
- American Samoa
- New Caledonia
- Papua New Guinea
- Tahiti
- Wallis and Futuna
- Vanuatu

== Group stage ==
New Caledonia and Tahiti would be the top two highest ranked team in the group stage and thus advanced to the finals of the tournament, while Papua New Guinea and Vanuatu were the third and fourth ranked teams and advanced to the bronze medal match. Wallis and Futuna and American Samoa were the lowest placed teams and did not play another match.

Team	Pts	Pld	W	D	L	GF	GA	GD
New Caledonia	8	5	4	0	1	25	4	+21
Tahiti	7	4	3	1	0	9	3	+6
Papua New Guinea	6	5	2	2	1	23	3	+20
Vanuatu	5	5	2	1	2	15	10	+5
Wallis and Futuna	2	5	1	0	4	7	18	–11
American Samoa	0	4	0	0	4	1	42	–41

9 December 1987

New Caledonia	10–0	American Samoa

New Caledonia

9 December 1987

Tahiti	0–0	Papua New Guinea

New Caledonia

9 December 1987

Vanuatu	6–1	Wallis and Futuna

New Caledonia

10 December 1987

New Caledonia	2–0	Papua New Guinea

New Caledonia

10 December 1987

Tahiti	4–0	Wallis and Futuna

New Caledonia

10 December 1987

Vanuatu	7–0	American Samoa

New Caledonia

12 December 1987

New Caledonia	2–3	Tahiti

New Caledonia

12 December 1987

Vanuatu	1–1	Papua New Guinea

New Caledonia

12 December 1987

Wallis and Futuna	5–1	American Samoa

New Caledonia

15 December 1987

New Caledonia	5–1	Wallis and Futuna

New Caledonia

15 December 1987

Papua New Guinea	20–0	American Samoa

New Caledonia

15 December 1987

Tahiti	2–1	Vanuatu

New Caledonia

17 December 1987

New Caledonia	6–0	Vanuatu

New Caledonia

17 December 1987

Papua New Guinea	2–0	Wallis and Futuna

New Caledonia

17 December 1987

Tahiti	Not Played	American Samoa

New Caledonia

== Bronze medal match ==
Papua New Guinea won over Vanuatu 3–1 and thus won the bronze medal in the tournament.

19 December 1987

Papua New Guinea	3–1	Vanuatu

New Caledonia

== Gold medal match ==
New Caledonia won over Tahiti 1–0 and thus won the gold medal, the team's fourth title in the tournament.

19 December 1987

New Caledonia	1–0	Tahiti

New Caledonia

1987 South Pacific Games winners

New Caledonia
Fourth title
