= Football at the 1971 South Pacific Games =

Men's Football at the 1971 South Pacific Games
Tournament details
- Host country: Tahiti
- Dates: 1 to 5 September
- Teams: 6 (from 1 confederation)

Final positions
- Champions: New Caledonia (3rd title)
- Runners-up: New Hebrides
- Third place: Tahiti

Tournament statistics
- Matches played: 11
- Goals scored: 103 (9.36 per match)

Football was contested as part of the programme for the 1971 South Pacific Games which was hosted in Tahiti. It was the fourth edition of the men's football tournament at the multi-sport event organised by the Pacific Games Council.

== Background ==
The first men's football tournament was held at the inaugural games in 1963 held in Suva, Fiji and was regularly held up until the games before this edition, which were the 1969 South Pacific Games in Port Moresby, Papua New Guinea. New Caledonia has won every edition of the tournament up until these games except when French Polynesia had won the tournament at the 1966 South Pacific Games in Nouméa.

== Format ==
Six teams took part in the competition. They were drawn into two round robin groups, two groups of three teams. The two best placed teams from each group would qualify for the semifinals. The remaining teams would play in a fifth place play-off match. The winning team from each semifinal would contest the gold medal match and the losing team from each would contest the bronze medal match. The competition would be held from 1 to 5 September 1971.

=== Participants ===
- Cook Islands (Debut)
- Fiji
- New Caledonia
- New Hebrides
- Papua New Guinea
- Tahiti (Host)

== Games ==
=== Group A ===
Tahiti and Papua New Guinea would both receive one win and one loss, with the Cook Islands losing twice, the former two would advance to the semifinals. Tahiti's win over the Cook Islands with a score of 30–0 would set a record for the highest win margin in an edition of the men's football tournament.

Team	Pts	Pld	W	D	L	GF	GA	GD
Tahiti	3	2	1	1	0	32	2	+30
Papua New Guinea	3	2	1	1	0	18	3	+15
Cook Islands	0	2	0	0	2	1	46	–45

1 September 1971

Tahiti	2–2	Papua New Guinea

Tahiti

2 September 1971

Tahiti	30–0	Cook Islands

Tahiti

3 September 1971

Papua New Guinea	16–1	Cook Islands

Tahiti

=== Group B ===
New Caledonia and New Hebrides would both receive one win and one draw, with Fiji losing twice, the former two would advance to the semifinals.

Team	Pts	Pld	W	D	L	GF	GA	GD
New Caledonia	3	2	1	1	0	5	1	+4
New Hebrides	3	2	1	1	0	6	4	+2
Fiji	0	2	0	0	2	5	11	–6

1 September 1971

New Caledonia	5–1	Fiji

Tahiti

2 September 1971

Fiji	4–6	New Hebrides

Tahiti

3 September 1971

New Caledonia	0–0	New Hebrides

Tahiti

== 5th place match ==
Fiji defeated the Cook Islands in the fifth-place match.

4 September 1971

Fiji	15–1	Cook Islands

Tahiti

== Final stage ==
=== Bracket ===
Semi-finals
4 September
New Caledonia	4
Papua New Guinea	0
4 September
Tahiti	1
New Hebrides	2

Final
5 September
New Caledonia	7
New Hebrides	1
Third place
5 September
Tahiti	8
Papua New Guinea	1

==== Semi-finals ====
New Caledonia defeated Papua New Guinea in the first semi-final match, while New Hebrides defeated Tahiti in the second semi-final match.

4 September 1971

New Caledonia	4–0	Papua New Guinea

Tahiti

4 September 1971

Tahiti	1–2	New Hebrides

Tahiti

==== Third place match ====
Tahiti defeated the Papua New Guinea in the bronze medal match.

5 September 1971

Tahiti	8–1	Papua New Guinea

Tahiti

==== Final ====
New Caledonia defeated New Hebrides in the gold medal match.

5 September 1971

New Caledonia	7–1	New Hebrides

Tahiti
Attendance: 16,000

== Final rankings ==
Rank	Team
Gold medal	New Caledonia
Silver medal	New Hebrides
Bronze medal	Tahiti
4	Papua New Guinea
5	Fiji
6	Cook Islands
