= Football at the 1995 South Pacific Games =

Tournament details
- Host country: Tahiti
- Dates: 16–26 August
- Teams: 9 (from 1 confederation)

Final positions
- Champions: Tahiti (1st title)
- Runners-up: Solomon Islands
- Third place: Fiji

Tournament statistics
- Matches played: 20
- Goals scored: 132 (6.6 per match)

Football was contested as part of the programme for the 1995 South Pacific Games which was hosted in Papeete, Tahiti from 25 August to 5 September 1995. It was the 10th edition of the men's football tournament at the multi-sport event organised by the Pacific Games Council.

The football tournament began with the first matches of the group stage on 16 August 1995 and ended with the gold medal match on 26 August 1995. Hosts Tahiti and 1991 finalists the Solomon Islands contested the final. Tahiti defeated the Solomon Islands 2–0 to win the gold medal for the fifth time. In the bronze medal match, Fiji defeated Vanuatu 3–0.

The competition also marked the most recent appearance of Wallis and Futuna in the Pacific Games. The team has not played a football match of any description since their final group stage match – a 10–0 defeat to New Caledonia on 20 August 1995.

== Background ==
Football had been part of the South Pacific Games programme following the debut of the men's competition at the inaugural 1963 South Pacific Games in Fiji.

New Caledonia and Tahiti jointly held the record for gold medals having won the football tournament four times each. Fiji were the defending champions after defeating the Solomon Islands 5–4 on penalties in the gold medal match at the 1991 South Pacific Games in Papua New Guinea.

== Format ==
A total of nine teams took part in the competition. They were drawn into two single round robin groups, one of four teams and one of five teams. The group winners and runners-up would contest the semi-finals which would decide the teams contesting the gold and bronze medal matches.

=== Participants ===
- Cook Islands
- Fiji
- Guam
- New Caledonia
- Papua New Guinea
- Solomon Islands
- Tahiti
- Vanuatu
- Wallis and Futuna

== Group Phase ==
=== Group A ===
Tahiti and the Solomon Islands advanced to the semi-finals.

==== Table ====
Pos	Team	Pld	W	D	L	GF	GA	GD	Pts	Qualification
1	Tahiti	4	4	0	0	30	2	+28	12	Semi-finals
2	Solomon Islands	4	3	0	1	31	5	+26	9	Semi-finals
3	New Caledonia	4	2	0	2	19	3	+16	6	
4	Cook Islands	4	1	0	3	2	37	−35	3	
5	Wallis and Futuna	4	0	0	4	2	37	−35	0	

==== Matches ====
16 August 1995

New Caledonia	9–0	Cook Islands

16 August 1995

Solomon Islands	12–1	Wallis and Futuna

17 August 1995

Tahiti	13–0	Wallis and Futuna

18 August 1995

Solomon Islands	1–0	New Caledonia

19 August 1995

Cook Islands	2–1	Wallis and Futuna

19 August 1995

Tahiti	4–2	Solomon Islands

20 August 1995

New Caledonia	10–0	Wallis and Futuna

21 August 1995

Solomon Islands	16–0	Cook Islands

21 August 1995

Tahiti	2–0	New Caledonia

22 August 1995

Tahiti	11–0	Cook Islands

=== Group B ===
Fiji and the Vanuatu advanced to the semi-finals.

==== Table ====
Pos	Team	Pld	W	D	L	GF	GA	GD	Pts	Qualification
1	Fiji	3	2	1	0	13	3	+10	7	Semi-finals
2	Vanuatu	3	2	0	1	10	3	+7	6	Semi-finals
3	Papua New Guinea	3	1	1	1	11	5	+6	4	
4	Guam	3	0	0	3	0	23	−23	0	

==== Matches ====
16 August 1995

Fiji	2–2	Papua New Guinea

16 August 1995

Vanuatu	6–0	Guam

20 August 1995

Fiji	8–0	Guam

20 August 1995

Vanuatu	3–0	Papua New Guinea

22 August 1995

Fiji	3–1	Vanuatu

22 August 1995

Papua New Guinea	9–0	Guam

== Semi–finals ==
Fiji defeated the Solomon Islands on penalties and Tahiti defeated Vanuatu to advance the gold medal match.

24 August 1995

Solomon Islands	3–3 Solomon won on penalties	Fiji

24 August 1995

Tahiti	3–0	Vanuatu

== Bronze medal match ==
Fiji defeated Vanuatu to win the bronze medal.

26 August 1995

Fiji	3–0	Vanuatu

== Gold medal match ==
Tahiti defeated the Solomon Islands to win the gold medal.

26 August 1995

Tahiti	2–0	Solomon Islands

== Aftermath ==
The match between Wallis and Futuna and New Caledonia on 20 August 1995 was the most recent to involve Wallis and Futuna.
