= Football at the 1969 South Pacific Games =

Tournament details
- Host country: Papua New Guinea
- Dates: 14–22 August
- Teams: 6 (from 1 confederation)

Final positions
- Champions: New Caledonia (2nd title)
- Runners-up: Tahiti
- Third place: Papua New Guinea

Tournament statistics
- Matches played: 16
- Goals scored: 77 (4.81 per match)

Football was contested as part of the programme for the 1969 South Pacific Games which was hosted in Port Moresby, Papua New Guinea from 13 to 23 August 1969. It was the third edition of the men's football tournament at the multi-sport event organised by the Pacific Games Council.

The football tournament began with the first matches of the group stage on 14 August 1969 and ended with the gold medal match on 22 August 1969. New Caledonia and defending champions Tahiti contested the final in what was a replay of the 1966 final. New Caledonia defeated Tahiti 2–1 to win the gold medal. In the bronze medal match, Papua New Guinea defeated Fiji 2–1.

== Background ==
Football had been part of the South Pacific Games programme following the debut of the men's competition at the inaugural 1963 South Pacific Games in Fiji. New Caledonia had won the inaugural tournament after defeating hosts Fiji 8–2 in the gold medal match. Tahiti were the defending champions after defeating hosts New Caledonia 2–0 in the gold medal match at the 1966 South Pacific Games.

== Format ==
The five teams played a single round robin group. The teams finishing first and second would contest the gold medal match and the teams finishing third and fourth would contest the bronze medal match.

=== Participants ===
- Fiji
- (France) New Caledonia
- New Hebrides
- Papua New Guinea (host)
- Solomon Islands
- Tahiti

== Round robin stage ==
New Caledonia won the group to progress to the gold medal match alongside Tahiti.

Team	Pts	Pld	W	D	L	GF	GA	GD
New Caledonia	9	5	4	1	0	18	2	+16
Tahiti	7	5	3	1	1	15	4	+11
Papua New Guinea	5	5	2	1	2	9	9	0
Fiji	5	5	2	1	2	11	17	–6
Solomon Islands	3	5	1	1	3	9	19	–10
New Hebrides	1	5	0	1	4	8	19	–11
Source: • Teams ranked 1st and 2nd (Green background) met in the Gold final. • Teams ranked 3rd and 4th (Blue background) met in the Bronze final.

=== Round 1 ===
14 August 1969

Fiji	5–1	Solomon Islands

Germania Club, Port Moresby

14 August 1969

Tahiti	3–3	New Hebrides

Germania Club, Port Moresby

14 August 1969

New Caledonia	4–1	Papua New Guinea
Poithily 50'; Zeoula 53', 80'; Delmas 56'		Kumalau 29'

Germania Club, Port Moresby

=== Round 2 ===
15 August 1969

Solomon Islands	1–1	New Caledonia

Germania Club, Port Moresby

15 August 1969

Fiji	5–2	New Hebrides

Germania Club, Port Moresby

15 August 1969

Tahiti	3–1	Papua New Guinea

Germania Club, Port Moresby

=== Round 3 ===
16 August 1969

New Caledonia	2–0	New Hebrides

Germania Club, Port Moresby

16 August 1969

Papua New Guinea	4–0	Solomon Islands

Germania Club, Port Moresby

16 August 1969

Tahiti	2–0	Fiji

Germania Club, Port Moresby

=== Round 4 ===
18 August 1969

New Caledonia	11–0	Fiji

Germania Club, Port Moresby

18 August 1969

Papua New Guinea	2–1	New Hebrides
Kau 20'; Raka 90'		Unknown 41'

Germania Club, Port Moresby

18 August 1969

Tahiti	7–0	Solomon Islands

Germania Club, Port Moresby

=== Round 5 ===
20 August 1969

Solomon Islands	7–2	New Hebrides

Germania Club, Port Moresby

20 August 1969

Papua New Guinea	1–1	Fiji

Germania Club, Port Moresby

Tahiti forfeited their final group stage match against New Caledonia after they were unable to field a team due to injuries to 11 of their 19-man squad.

20 August 1969

New Caledonia	w/o*	Tahiti

Germania Club, Port Moresby

== Bronze medal match ==
Papua New Guinea defeated Fiji to win the bronze medal.

22 August 1969

Papua New Guinea	2–1	Fiji
Jojoga 2'		Unknown

National Stadium, Port Moresby

== Gold medal match ==
New Caledonia defeated Tahiti to win the gold medal.

22 August 1969

New Caledonia	2–1	Tahiti
Teamboueon 50'; Fi 88'		Cholita 32'

National Stadium, Port Moresby
