= Football at the 1991 South Pacific Games =

Tournament details
- Host country: Papua New Guinea
- Dates: 9–20 September
- Teams: 8 (from 1 confederation)

Final positions
- Champions: Fiji (4th title)
- Runners-up: Solomon Islands
- Third place: New Caledonia

Tournament statistics
- Matches played: 16
- Goals scored: 79 (4.94 per match)

Football was contested as part of the programme for the 1991 South Pacific Games which was hosted in Port Moresby and Lae, Papua New Guinea from 7 to 21 September 1991. It was the ninth edition of the men's football tournament at the multi-sport event organised by the Pacific Games Council.

The football tournament began with the first matches of the group stage on 9 September 1991 and ended with the gold medal match on 20 September 1991. Fiji and the Solomon Islands contested the final. The match ended in a 1–1 draw and Fiji won 5–4 on penalties to become the first team other than New Caledonia or Tahiti to win the gold medal. In the bronze medal match, New Caledonia defeated Vanuatu 3–0.

== Background ==
Football had been part of the South Pacific Games programme following the debut of the men's competition at the inaugural 1963 South Pacific Games in Fiji.

New Caledonia and Tahiti jointly held the record for gold medals having won the football tournament four times each from the first eight editions. New Caledonia were also the defending champions after defeating Tahiti 1–0 as hosts in the gold medal match at the 1987 South Pacific Games.

== Format ==
A total of eight teams took part in the competition. They were drawn into two single round robin groups of four teams. The group winners and runners-up would contest the semi-finals which would decide the teams contesting the gold and bronze medal matches. A consolation tournament was held for the teams finishing third and fourth in the group stage.

=== Participants ===
- Fiji
- Guam
- New Caledonia
- Papua New Guinea
- Solomon Islands
- Tahiti
- Vanuatu
- Wallis and Futuna

== Group stage ==
=== Group A ===
The Solomon Islands and Vanuatu advanced to the semi-finals while Papua New Guinea and Wallis and Futuna advanced to the consolation tournament.

==== Table ====
Pos	Team	Pld	W	D	L	GF	GA	GD	Pts	Qualification
1	Solomon Islands	3	2	1	0	8	0	+8	5	Semi-finals
2	Vanuatu	3	2	0	1	5	3	+2	4	Semi-finals
3	Papua New Guinea	3	1	1	1	5	1	+4	3	Consolation tournament
4	Wallis and Futuna	3	0	0	3	0	14	−14	0	Consolation tournament

==== Matches ====
9 September 1991

Solomon Islands	0–0	Papua New Guinea

Sir Ignatius Kilage Stadium, Lae
9 September 1991

Vanuatu	4–0	Wallis and Futuna

Sir Ignatius Kilage Stadium, Lae

11 September 1991

Solomon Islands	5–0	Wallis and Futuna

Sir Ignatius Kilage Stadium, Lae
11 September 1991

Vanuatu	1–0	Papua New Guinea

Sir Ignatius Kilage Stadium, Lae

13 September 1991

Solomon Islands	3–0	Vanuatu

Sir Ignatius Kilage Stadium, Lae
13 September 1991

Papua New Guinea	5–0	Wallis and Futuna

Sir Ignatius Kilage Stadium, Lae

=== Group B ===
Fiji and New Caledonia advanced to the semi-finals while Tahiti and Guam advanced to the consolation tournament.

==== Table ====
Pos	Team	Pld	W	D	L	GF	GA	GD	Pts	Qualification
1	Fiji	3	3	0	0	20	2	+18	6	Semi-finals
2	New Caledonia	3	1	1	1	21	5	+16	3	Semi-finals
3	Tahiti	3	1	1	1	17	5	+12	3	Consolation tournament
4	Guam	3	0	0	3	1	47	−46	0	Consolation tournament

==== Matches ====
10 September 1991

Tahiti	15–0	Guam

Sir Ignatius Kilage Stadium, Lae
10 September 1991

Fiji	3–1	New Caledonia

Sir Ignatius Kilage Stadium, Lae

12 September 1991

New Caledonia	2–2	Tahiti

Sir Ignatius Kilage Stadium, Lae
12 September 1991

Fiji	14–1	Guam

Sir Ignatius Kilage Stadium, Lae

14 September 1991

Tahiti	0–3	Fiji

Sir Ignatius Kilage Stadium, Lae

14 September 1991

Guam	0–18	New Caledonia

Sir Ignatius Kilage Stadium, Lae

== Semi-finals ==
In the semi-finals, Fiji defeated Vanuatu and the Solomon Islands defeated New Caledonia to advance to the gold medal match.

17 September 1991

Fiji	3–1	Vanuatu

Sir Ignatius Kilage Stadium, Lae

17 September 1991

Solomon Islands	4–1	New Caledonia

Sir Ignatius Kilage Stadium, Lae

== Bronze medal match ==
New Caledonia won the bronze medal after defeating Vanuatu.

19 September 1991

New Caledonia	3–0	Vanuatu

Sir Ignatius Kilage Stadium, Lae

== Gold medal match ==
After a 1–1 draw, Fiji won the gold medal by defeating the Solomon Islands in a penalty shoot-out.

20 September 1991

Fiji	1–1	Solomon Islands
Nawalu 26'		Matei 37'
Penalties
	5–4

Sir Ignatius Kilage Stadium, Lae
Referee: Peter Hulme

== Consolation tournament ==
=== Semi-finals ===
In the consolation tournament semi-finals, Tahiti defeated Wallis and Futuna to advance to the fifth-place play-off. The match between Papua New Guinea and Guam was not played and Papua New Guinea advanced to the fifth-place play-off.

17 September 1991

Tahiti	5–0	Wallis and Futuna

Sir Ignatius Kilage Stadium, Lae

17 September 1991

Papua New Guinea	Not played	Guam

Sir Ignatius Kilage Stadium, Lae

=== Seventh-place play-off ===
Wallis and Futuna defeated Guam in the seventh-place play-off.

18 September 1991

Wallis and Futuna	5–0	Guam

Sir Ignatius Kilage Stadium, Lae

=== Fifth-place play-off ===
Tahiti defeated Papua New Guinea in the fifth-place play-off but the score is unknown.

18 September 1991

Papua New Guinea	v	Tahiti

Sir Ignatius Kilage Stadium, Lae
