= Football at the 1983 South Pacific Games =

Tournament details
- Host country: Western Samoa
- Dates: 20–30 August
- Teams: 11 (from 1 confederation)

Final positions
- Champions: Tahiti (4th title)
- Runners-up: Fiji
- Third place: New Caledonia

Football was contested as part of the programme for the 1983 South Pacific Games which was hosted in Apia, Western Samoa from 5 to 16 September 1983. It was the seventh edition of the men's football tournament at the multi-sport event organised by the Pacific Games Council.

The football tournament began with the first matches of the group stage on 20 August 1983 and ended with the gold medal match on 15 September 1983. The tournament marked the only appearance of the Niue national football team who were eliminated in the group stage after heavily losing both their matches.

The final, which was contested by 1979 finalists Fiji and two-time defending champions Tahiti, was marred by violence after the referee was injured and a Fijian player arrested. Tahiti defeated Fiji 1–0 to win the gold medal. In the bronze medal match, the New Caledonia defeated Papua New Guinea 2–1.

== Background ==
Football had been part of the South Pacific Games programme following the debut of the men's competition at the inaugural 1963 South Pacific Games in Fiji.

New Caledonia and Tahiti held the record for gold medals having won the football tournament three times. Tahiti were the two-time defending champions after defeating Fiji 3–0 in the gold medal match at the 1979 South Pacific Games in Fiji and New Caledonia 2–1 after extra time in the gold medal match at the 1975 South Pacific Games in Guam.

Niue had never before fielded a football team.

== Format ==
A total of 12 teams were due to take part in the competition. They were drawn into three single round robin groups of four teams. The group winners and runners-up would contest the quarter-finals The three winners of the quarter-finals along with the losing quarter-finalist with the best overall record would contest the semi-finals which would decide the teams contesting the gold and bronze medal matches. After the withdrawal of the Northern Mariana Islands, Group B was contested by just three teams but the rest of the format was unchanged.

== Group stage ==
=== Group A ===
Wallis and Futuna won the group to progress to the quarter-finals alongside Western Samoa.

Team	Pts	Pld	W	D	L	GF	GA	GD
Wallis and Futuna	4	3	2	0	1	5	4	+1
Western Samoa	3	3	1	1	1	7	6	+1
Tonga	3	3	1	1	1	6	8	–2
American Samoa	2	3	1	0	2	6	6	0

20 August 1983

Western Samoa	3–1	American Samoa

Western Samoa

22 August 1983

Western Samoa	3–3	Tonga

Western Samoa

22 August 1983

Wallis and Futuna	0–3	American Samoa

Western Samoa

24 August 1983

Western Samoa	1–2	Wallis and Futuna

Western Samoa

24 August 1983

Tonga	3–2	American Samoa

Western Samoa

26 August 1983

Wallis and Futuna	3–0	Tonga

Western Samoa

=== Group B ===
The Northern Mariana Islands withdrew before the start of the competition. Tahiti won the group to progress to the quarter-finals alongside Papua New Guinea.

Team	Pts	Pld	W	D	L	GF	GA	GD
Tahiti	4	2	2	0	0	16	1	+15
Papua New Guinea	2	2	1	0	1	20	2	+18
Niue	0	2	0	0	2	0	33	–33
Northern Mariana Islands	Withdrew							

20 August 1983

Tahiti	14–0	Niue

Western Samoa

Northern Mariana Islands	Cancelled	Papua New Guinea

Western Samoa

22 August 1983

Papua New Guinea	19–0	Niue

Western Samoa

Tahiti	Cancelled	Northern Mariana Islands

Western Samoa

24 August 1983

Papua New Guinea	1–2	Tahiti

Western Samoa

Niue	Cancelled	Northern Mariana Islands

Western Samoa

=== Group C ===
Fiji won the group to progress to the quarter-finals alongside New Caledonia.

Team	Pts	Pld	W	D	L	GF	GA	GD
Fiji	6	3	3	0	0	21	1	+20
New Caledonia	4	3	2	0	1	8	7	+1
Solomon Islands	2	3	1	0	2	0	11	–11
Vanuatu	0	3	0	0	3	2	12	–10

24 August 1983

Fiji	10–0	Solomon Islands

Western Samoa

August 1983

New Caledonia	6–2	Vanuatu

Western Samoa

26 August 1983

Fiji	6–0	Vanuatu

Western Samoa

August 1983

New Caledonia	1–0	Solomon Islands

Western Samoa

August 1983

Fiji	5–1	New Caledonia

Western Samoa

August 1983

Solomon Islands	def.	Vanuatu

Western Samoa

== Quarter-finals ==
Tahiti defeated Western Samoa, New Caledonia defeated Wallis and Futuna and Fiji defeated Papua New Guinea in the quarter-finals. Papua New Guinea, as the losing semi-finalist with the best overall record, also advanced to the semi-finals.

26 August 1983

Western Samoa	0–2	Tahiti

Western Samoa

26 August 1983

New Caledonia	4–0	Wallis and Futuna

Western Samoa

August 1983

Papua New Guinea	0–2	Fiji

Western Samoa

== Semi-finals ==
Tahiti defeated Papua New Guinea and Fiji defeated New Caledonia in the semi-finals.

28 August 1983

Tahiti	6–1	Papua New Guinea

Western Samoa

28 August 1983

Fiji	3–2	New Caledonia

Western Samoa

== Bronze medal match ==
New Caledonia defeated Papua New Guinea to win the bronze medal.

30 August 1983

Papua New Guinea	1–2	New Caledonia

Western Samoa

== Gold medal match ==
The final of the competition, between Fiji and Tahiti, was disrupted by a fight between the players after Tahiti scored a goal in the closing minutes. A referee was injured and a Fijian player was arrested. Tahiti defeated Fiji to win the gold medal.

30 August 1983

Fiji	0–1	Tahiti

Western Samoa
