= Football at the 2003 South Pacific Games =

Football at the XII Pacific Games
- Dates: 30 June – 30 July 2003
- Host city: Suva, Fiji
- Level: Senior
- Events: 2
- Participation: 11 nations

Football at the 2003 South Pacific Games in Suva, Fiji was held from 30 June to 30 July 2003.

== Medal summary ==
=== Medal table ===
Rank	Nation	Gold	Silver	Bronze	Total
1	Fiji (FIJ)	1	0	0	1
1	Papua New Guinea (PNG)	1	0	0	1
3	Guam (GUM)	0	1	0	1
3	New Caledonia (NCL)	0	1	0	1
5	Tonga (TGA)	0	0	1	1
5	Vanuatu (VAN)	0	0	1	1
Totals (6 entries)		2	2	2	6

=== Results ===
Event	Gold	Silver	Bronze
Men	Fiji	New Caledonia	Vanuatu
Women	Papua New Guinea	Guam	Tonga
