= Sir Ignatius Kilage Stadium =

Football stadium in Papua New Guinea

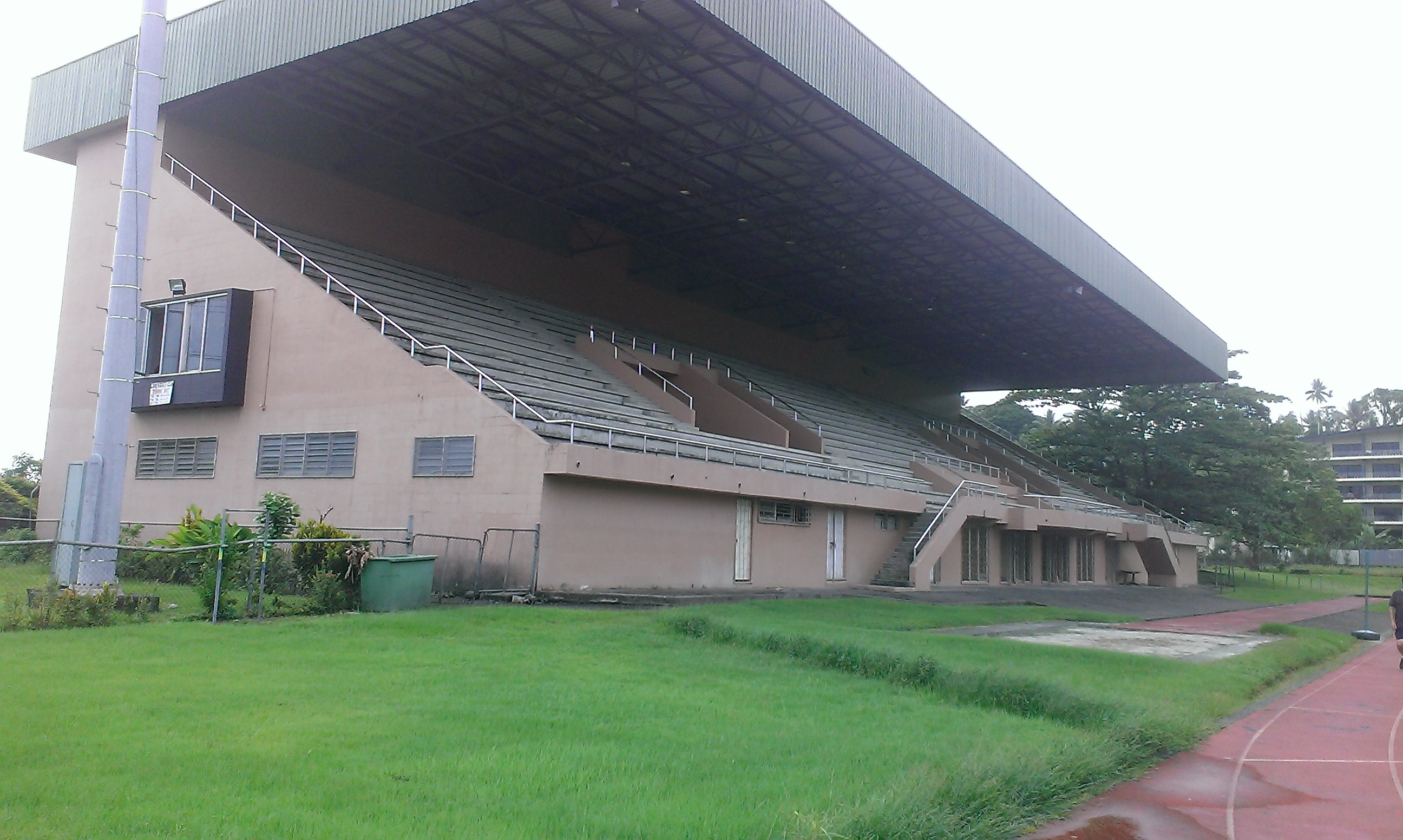
- Interactive map of Sir Ignatius Kilage Stadium
- Full name: Sir Ignatius Kilage Stadium
- Location: Markham Road, Voco Point; Lae, Papua New Guinea
- Coordinates: 6.735616°S 147.006596°E
- Capacity: 1,500
- Surface: Grass

Construction
- Opened: 1990
- Renovated: 2016

Tenants
- Papua New Guinea National Soccer League; Papua New Guinea national football team

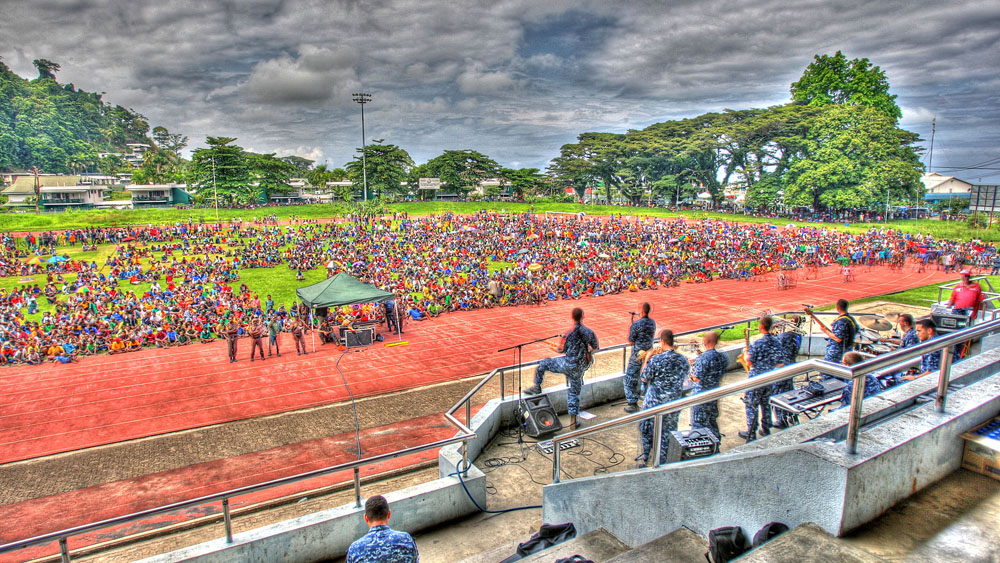
Stadium hosting a concert in 2011

The Sir Ignatius Kilage Sports Stadium is an association football stadium located in Lae, Papua New Guinea. It was named after Sir Ignatius Kilage who was the fourth Governor General of Papua New Guinea. The stadium, which is part of the larger Sir Ignatius Kilage Sports Complex, features 500 grandstand seats plus an additional 1,000 bench seats. It is the home stadium of the Papua New Guinea National Soccer League Southern Conference.

== History ==
The stadium was first built in 1990 for the 1991 South Pacific Games. In 2016, the stadium underwent an extensive restoration in preparation for the 2016 Papua New Guinea games.

== Notable events ==
The stadium has hosted matches of the Papua New Guinea national football team, including a 2018 FIFA World Cup qualification fixture against the Solomon Islands in June 2017.

It was originally announced that the stadium would undergo renovations and be a venue for the 2016 FIFA U-20 Women's World Cup. However, it was not one of the final venues chosen for the tournament.

In 2003 and 2005, the Oceania Area Championships in Athletics were held at the stadium.

== See also ==
- Lae City F.C.
- Lae City Dwellers
