= Football at the Pacific Games =

- Founded: 1963
- Current champions: New Caledonia; Men (2023); Papua New Guinea; Women (2023)
- Most championships: New Caledonia; Men (8 titles); Papua New Guinea; Women (6 titles)
- Football at the 2023 Pacific Games; Men's · Women's

Association football has been regularly included in the Pacific Games, the multi-sports event for Pacific nations, territories and dependencies, since 1963. Until 2011 the competition was known as the South Pacific Games.

Since 1971 the men's tournament has been held every four years, but was not played in 1999 due to contractual issues. In 2007, the men's competition doubled as the Oceania Football Confederation's preliminary qualifying competition for the 2010 FIFA World Cup. The men's tournament also became the Olympic qualifier for Oceania for the 2015 edition.

The women's tournament was introduced in 2003, and has doubled up as the preliminary qualifying competition for the Olympic Games since 2007. Football was a compulsory inclusion at the Pacific Games for men's teams for many years but was made a core sport for both men's and women's teams in 2017. Football has also been held at several editions of the Pacific Mini Games, starting with the first tournament in 1981.

== Men's tournament ==
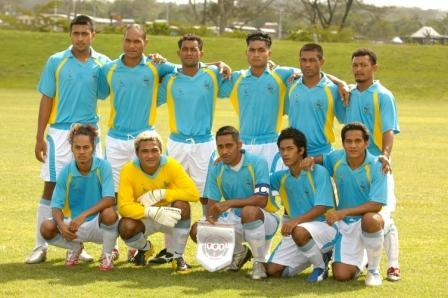
The Tuvalu men's team at the 2007 South Pacific Games

=== Participating nations ===
Numbers refer to the final placing of each team at the respective Games. Host nation is shown in bold.– See also the §Key to symbols within this section below the two tables.

Games Nation	63	66	69	71	75	79	83	87	91	95	99	03	07	11	15	19	23	Years played
American Samoa	–	–	–	–	–	–	P	6	–	–	–	–	P	P	–	P	12	6
Cook Islands	–	–	–	6	–	–	–	–	–	P	–	–	P	P	–	–	8	5
Fiji	**2**	–	4	5	4	**2**	2	–	1	3	–	**1**	2	4	4	3	3	14
Guam	–	–	–	–	**P**	6	–	–	P	P	–	–	–	P	–	–	–	5
Kiribati	–	–	–	–	–	9*	–	–	–	–	–	P	–	P	–	–	†	3
Micronesia	–	–	–	–	–	–	–	–	–	–	–	P	–	–	P	–	–	2
New Caledonia	1	**2**	1	1	2	4	3	**1**	3	P	–	2	1	**1**	1	2	1	16
New Zealand U-23	–	–	–	–	–	–	–	–	–	–	–	–	–	–	‡	1	–	2
Niue	–	–	–	–	–	–	P	–	–	–	–	–	–	–	–	–	–	1
Northern Mariana Islands	–	–	–	–	–	–	†	–	–	–	–	–	–	–	–	–	10	1
Papua New Guinea	P	4	**3**	4	P	9*	4	3	**P**	P	–	P	–	P	**3**	4	6	15
Samoa	–	–	–	–	–	9*	**5***	–	–	–	–	–	**P**	–	–	**P**	7	5
Solomon Islands	4	P	6	–	3	3	P	–	2	2	–	P	4	2	P	P	**2**	14
Tahiti	3	1	2	**3**	1	1	1	2	P	**1**	–	4	P	3	2	P	5	16
Tonga	–	–	–	–	–	7*	P	–	–	–	–	P	P	–	–	P	11	6
Tuvalu	–	–	–	–	–	7*	–	–	–	–	–	P	P	P	–	P	9	6
Vanuatu	P	3	5	2	P	5	P	4	4	4	–	3	3	P	P	P	4	16
Wallis and Futuna	–	P	–	–	–	9*	5*	5	P	P	–	–	–	–	–	–	–	6
Number of teams All-time total: 18	6	6	6	6	7	12	11	6	8	9	–	10	10	11	8^{#}	11	12	16 Editions

=== Legend ===
Key to symbols
1	Gold medal for first place	n	n^{th} place (e.g. 5 is fifth place)
2	Silver medal for second place	P	Pool or group stage elimination
3	Bronze medal for third place	*	Asterisk for shared placing (e.g. 5* is equal fifth)
4	Fourth place	^{#}	Contested by under-23 national teams only
–	Did not play	†	Withdrew before competition (did not play)
‡	Played in the tournament (FIFA qualification) but excluded from the Pacific Games placings		

=== Results ===
The table below is a summary of the finals matches in men's football at the Pacific Games since 1963:

Year	Host city		Final		Third place match		
Year	Host city	Gold	Score	Silver	Bronze	Score	Fourth place
1963	(Fiji); Suva	New Caledonia	**8–2**	Fiji	Tahiti	**7–2**	Solomon Islands
1966	(New Caledonia); Nouméa	Tahiti	**2–0**	New Caledonia	New Hebrides	**5–2**	Papua New Guinea
1969	(Papua New Guinea); Port Moresby	New Caledonia	**2–1**	Tahiti	Papua New Guinea	**2–1**	Fiji
1971	(French Polynesia); Papeete	New Caledonia	**7–1**	New Hebrides	Tahiti	**8–1**	Papua New Guinea
1975	(Guam); Tumon	Tahiti	**2–1**	New Caledonia	Solomon Islands	**3–2**	Fiji
1979	(Fiji); Suva	Tahiti	**3–0**	Fiji	Solomon Islands	**3–1**	New Caledonia
1983	(Samoa); Apia	Tahiti	**1–0**	Fiji	New Caledonia	**2–1**	Papua New Guinea
1987	(New Caledonia); Nouméa	New Caledonia	**1–0**	Tahiti	Papua New Guinea	**3–1**	Vanuatu
1991	(Papua New Guinea); Port Moresby	Fiji	**1–1** (^{5–4}_{pen.})	Solomon Islands	New Caledonia	**3–1**	Vanuatu
1995	(French Polynesia); Papeete	Tahiti	**2–0**	Solomon Islands	Fiji	**3–0**	Vanuatu
1999	No football tournament in 1999						
2003	(Fiji); Suva	Fiji	**2–0**	New Caledonia	Vanuatu	**1–0**	Tahiti
2007	(Samoa); Apia	New Caledonia	**1–0**	Fiji	Vanuatu	**2–0**	Solomon Islands
2011	(New Caledonia); Nouméa	New Caledonia	**2–0**	Solomon Islands	Tahiti	**2–1**	Fiji
2015	(Papua New Guinea); Port Moresby	New Caledonia	**2–0**	Tahiti	Papua New Guinea	**2–1**	Fiji
2019	(Samoa); Apia	New Zealand U-23	**2–1**	New Caledonia	Fiji	**1–1** (^{4–2}_{pen.})	Papua New Guinea
2023	(Solomon Islands); Honiara	New Caledonia	**2–2** (^{7–6}_{pen.})	Solomon Islands	Fiji	**4–2**	Vanuatu

=== Performances by countries ===
Below are the 7 nations that have reached at least the semi-final stage in the Pacific Games.

Team	Winner	Runner-up	Third Place	Fourth Place
**New Caledonia**	**8** ('63, '69, '71, '87, '07, '11, '15, '23)	4 ('66, '75, '03, '19)	2 ('83, '91)	1 ('79)
**Tahiti** (French Polynesia)	**5** ('66, '75, '79, '83, '95)	3 ('69, '87, '15)	3 ('63, '71, '11)	1 ('03)
**Fiji**	**2** ('91, '03)	4 ('63, '79, '83, '07)	3 ('95, '19, '23)	4 ('69, '75, '11, '15)
**New Zealand U-23**	**1** ('19)			
Solomon Islands		4 ('91, '95, '11, '23)	2 ('75, '79)	2 ('63, '07)
Vanuatu (New Hebrides)		1 ('71)	3 ('66, '03, '07)	4 ('87, '91, '95, '23)
Papua New Guinea			3 ('69, '87, '15)	4 ('66, '71, '83, '19)

=== Golden boot awardees ===
Year	Player	Goals
1963–1995	Unknown	-
2003	(Fiji) Esala Masi	11
2007	(Fiji) Osea Vakatalesau	10
2011	(New Caledonia) Bertrand Kaï	10
2015	(Vanuatu) Jean Kaltak	17
2019	(Solomon Islands) Gagame Feni (Vanuatu) Tony Kaltak (New Caledonia) Jean-Philippe Saïko	9
2023	(Solomon Islands) John Orobulu	8

== Women's tournament ==
=== Participating nations ===
Games Nation	03	07	11	15	19	23	Years played
American Samoa	–	P	P	–	P	9	4
Cook Islands	–	P	P	3	4	10	5
Fiji	5	3	3	P	3	2	6
Guam	2	–	P	–	–	–	2
Kiribati	7	–	–	–	–	–	1
New Caledonia	–	P	2	2	P	3	5
Papua New Guinea	1	1	1	1	1	1	6
Samoa	–	P	–	4	2	4	4
Solomon Islands	–	P	P	P	P	6	5
Tahiti	4	4	P	–	P	8	5
Tonga	3	2	4	P	P	7	6
Vanuatu	6	–	–	–	P	5	3
Number of teams All-time total: 12	7	9	9	7	10	10	6 Editions

=== Results ===
The table below is a summary of the finals matches in the women's football competition at the Pacific Games since 2003.

Papua New Guinea won the first four tournament finals, including against hosts New Caledonia in 2011 and as hosts against New Caledonia in 2015.

Year	Host city		Final		Third place match		
Year	Host city	Gold	Score	Silver	Bronze	Score	Fourth place
2003	(Fiji); Suva	Papua New Guinea	round-robin	Guam	Tonga	round-robin	Tahiti
2007	(Samoa); Apia	Papua New Guinea	3–1	Tonga	Fiji	1–0	Tahiti
2011	(New Caledonia); Nouméa	Papua New Guinea	2–1	New Caledonia	Fiji	1–0	Tonga
2015	(Papua New Guinea); Port Moresby	Papua New Guinea	1–0	New Caledonia	Cook Islands	2–0	Samoa
2019	(Samoa); Apia	Papua New Guinea	3–1	Samoa	Fiji	3–1	Cook Islands
2023	(Solomon Islands); Honiara	Papua New Guinea	4–1	Fiji	New Caledonia	3–1	Samoa

=== Performances by countries ===
Team	Winner	Runner-up	Third Place	Fourth Place
Papua New Guinea	6 ('03, '07, '11, '15, '19, '23)			
New Caledonia		2 ('11, '15)	1 ('23)	
Fiji		1 ('23)	3 ('07, '11, '19)	
Tonga		1 ('07)	1 ('03)	1 ('11)
Samoa		1 ('19)		1 ('15, '23)
Guam		1 ('03)		
Cook Islands			1 ('15)	1 ('19)
(French Polynesia) Tahiti				2 ('03, '07)

=== Golden boot awardees ===
Year	Player	Goals
2003	Unknown	-
2007	(Tonga) Penateti Feke	4
2011	(New Caledonia) Christelle Wahnawe	12
2015	(New Caledonia) Christelle Wahnawe	10
2019	(Papua New Guinea) Ramona Padio	9
2023	(Papua New Guinea) Ramona Padio	11

== All-time medal table ==
- Total medals won (men's and women's)

Rank	Nation	Gold	Silver	Bronze	Total
1	New Caledonia	8	6	3	17
2	Papua New Guinea	6	0	3	9
3	French Polynesia	5	3	3	11
4	Fiji	2	5	6	13
5	New Zealand	1	0	0	1
6	Solomon Islands	0	4	2	6
7	Vanuatu (includes New Hebrides)	0	1	3	4
8	Tonga	0	1	1	2
9	Guam	0	1	0	1
9	Samoa (includes Western Samoa)	0	1	0	1
11	Cook Islands	0	0	1	1
Totals (11 entries)		22	22	22	66

== Pacific Mini Games ==
=== Men ===
The table below is a summary of the medal matches played in the men's competition at the Pacific Mini Games:

Year	Host city		Final		Third place match		
Year	Host city	Gold	Score	Silver	Bronze	Score	Fourth place
1981	(Solomon Islands); Honiara	Tahiti	1–0 (a.e.t.)	New Caledonia	Papua New Guinea	1–0	Vanuatu
1993	(Vanuatu); Port Vila	Tahiti	3–0	Fiji	New Caledonia	2–1	Vanuatu
2017	(Vanuatu); Port Vila	Vanuatu	round-robin	Fiji	Solomon Islands	round-robin	Tuvalu

=== Women ===
As of 2019, women's football has only been hosted once at the Pacific Mini Games – at Vanuatu in 2017. The table below is a summary of the medal matches played in the women's competition:

Year	Host city		Final		Third place match		
Year	Host city	Gold	Score	Silver	Bronze	Score	Fourth place
2017	(Vanuatu); Port Vila	Vanuatu	2–1	Fiji	Tonga	1–0	Solomon Islands
