= Football at the 1963 South Pacific Games =

Tournament details
- Host country: Fiji
- Dates: 29 August – 7 September
- Teams: 6 (from 1 confederation)

Final positions
- Champions: New Caledonia (1st title)
- Runners-up: Fiji
- Third place: Tahiti
- Fourth place: Solomon Islands

Tournament statistics
- Matches played: 6
- Goals scored: 49 (8.17 per match)

Football was contested as part of the programme for the 1963 South Pacific Games which was hosted in Suva, Fiji from 29 August to 8 September 1963. It was the first edition of the men's football tournament at the inaugural multi-sport event organised by the Pacific Games Council.

The football tournament began with the first round matches on 29 August 1963 and ended with the gold medal match on 7 September 1963. New Caledonia and hosts Fiji contested the final. Marc-Kanyan Case scored four goals as New Caledonia defeated Fiji 8–2 to win the gold medal. In the bronze medal match, Tahiti defeated the Solomon Islands 18–0.

== Background ==
The first edition of the South Pacific Games was held in Suva, Fiji.

== Format ==
Six teams took part in the competition. Four teams were drawn to contest the first round and two were given a bye to the semi-finals.

=== Participants ===
- Fiji
- New Caledonia
- New Hebrides
- Papua New Guinea
- Solomon Islands
- Tahiti

== Venues ==
The matches took part at Buckhurst Park in Suva and Churchill Park, Lautoka.

== First round ==
Fiji defeated Papua New Guinea and the Solomon Islands defeated the New Hebrides in the first round.

29 August 1963

Fiji	3–1	Papua New Guinea
Zikar Ali 30', 33'; Dutta		Voelker 15'

Buckhurst Park, Suva, Fiji
30 August 1963

Solomon Islands	6–3	New Hebrides
Suamoni (2); Beni (2); Mabulou; Famani		Gedeon; Tomoi; Kalbeo

Buckhurst Park, Suva, Fiji

== Semi-finals ==
Fiji defeated the Solomon Islands and New Caledonia defeated Tahiti in the semi-finals.

1 September 1963

Fiji	5–0	Solomon Islands
Zikar Ali (3); Dutta (2)

Churchill Park, Lautoka, Fiji
1 September 1963

New Caledonia	2–1 (a.e.t.)	Tahiti
Case 44', 115'		Nena 90'

== Bronze medal match ==
Tahiti defeated the Solomon Islands to win the bronze medal.

6 September 1963

Tahiti	18–0	Solomon Islands

Buckhurst Park, Suva, Fiji

== Gold medal match ==
New Caledonia defeated Fiji to win the gold medal.

7 September 1963

Fiji	2–8	New Caledonia
Yee Gock Sue (pen.); D. Simmons		Case (4); Paula (3); Bénébig

Buckhurst Park, Suva, Fiji

== Aftermath ==
New Caledonia would host the second edition of the South Pacific Games in Nouméa in 1966 South Pacific Games. As defending champions and hosts, New Caledonia would reach the gold medal match but they were unable to successfully defend their title as they lost 2–0 to Tahiti. In later years, they would go on to win a further seven gold medals in the men's football tournament.
