= Football at the 1966 South Pacific Games =

Tournament details
- Host country: New Caledonia
- Dates: 12–17 December
- Teams: 6 (from 1 confederation)

Final positions
- Champions: Tahiti (1st title)
- Runners-up: New Caledonia
- Third place: New Hebrides

Tournament statistics
- Matches played: 10
- Goals scored: 59 (5.9 per match)

Football was contested as part of the programme for the 1966 South Pacific Games which was hosted in Nouméa, New Caledonia from 8 to 18 December 1966. It was the second edition of the men's football tournament at the multi-sport event organised by the Pacific Games Council.

The football tournament began with the first matches of the group stage on 9 December 1966 and ended with the gold medal match on 17 December 1966. Hosts and defending champions New Caledonia and Tahiti contested the final. Tahiti defeated New Caledonia 2–0 to win the gold medal. In the bronze medal match, the New Hebrides defeated Papua New Guinea 5–2.

== Background ==
Football had been part of the South Pacific Games programme following the debut of the men's competition at the inaugural 1963 South Pacific Games in Fiji. New Caledonia were the defending champions after defeating hosts Fiji 8–2 in the gold medal match.

Wallis and Futuna had never before fielded a football team.

== Format ==
Six teams took part in the competition. They were drawn into two single round robin groups of three teams. The group winners and runners-up would contest the semi-finals which would decide the teams contesting the gold and bronze medal matches.

=== Participants ===
- (France) New Caledonia (host)
- New Hebrides
- Papua New Guinea
- Solomon Islands
- Tahiti
- Wallis and Futuna

== Group stage ==
=== Group 1 ===
Tahiti won the group to progress to the semi-finals alongside Papua New Guinea.

Team	Pts	Pld	W	D	L	GF	GA	GD
Tahiti	4	2	2	0	0	9	3	+6
Papua New Guinea	2	2	1	0	1	12	5	+7
Wallis and Futuna	0	2	0	0	2	1	14	–13

12 December 1966

Tahiti	4–3	Papua New Guinea

New Caledonia

13 December 1966

Tahiti	5–0	Wallis and Futuna

New Caledonia

14 December 1966

Papua New Guinea	9–1	Wallis and Futuna

New Caledonia

=== Group 2 ===
New Caledonia won the group to progress to the semi-finals alongside the New Hebrides.

Team	Pts	Pld	W	D	L	GF	GA	GD
New Caledonia	4	2	2	0	0	13	0	+13
New Hebrides	1	2	0	1	1	4	9	–5
Solomon Islands	1	2	0	1	1	4	12	–8

12 December 1966

New Caledonia	8–0	Solomon Islands

New Caledonia

13 December 1966

New Caledonia	5–0	New Hebrides

New Caledonia

14 December 1966

Solomon Islands	4–4	New Hebrides

New Caledonia

== Semi-finals ==
New Caledonia defeated Papua New Guinea and Tahiti defeated the New Hebrides in the semi-finals.

15 December 1966

New Caledonia	4–0	Papua New Guinea

New Caledonia

15 December 1966

Tahiti	3–0	New Hebrides

New Caledonia

== Bronze medal match ==
The New Hebrides defeated Papua New Guinea to win the bronze medal.

17 December 1966

New Hebrides	5–2	Papua New Guinea

New Caledonia

== Gold medal match ==
Tahiti defeated New Caledonia to win the bronze medal.

17 December 1966

New Caledonia	0–2	Tahiti

New Caledonia

1966 South Pacific Games winners

Tahiti
First title
