= 1966 South Pacific Games =

South Pacific Games in New Caledonia

- Host city: Nouméa
- Country: New Caledonia
- Nations: 14
- Events: 12 sports 86 medal events
- Opening: December 8, 1966
- Closing: December 18, 1966

The 2nd South Pacific Games (French: 2es Jeux du Pacifique sud), also known as Nouméa 1966, held on 8–18 December 1966 in Nouméa, New Caledonia, was the second edition of the South Pacific Games.

== Participating countries ==
Fourteen Pacific nations or territories participated in the Games:

- American Samoa
- Cook Islands
- Fiji
- French Polynesia
- Gilbert and Ellice Islands
- Guam
- Nauru
- New Caledonia
- New Hebrides
- (Papua New Guinea) Papua and New Guinea
- Solomon Islands
- Tonga
- Western Samoa
- Wallis and Futuna

== Sports ==
Twelve sports were contested at the 1966 South Pacific Games:

- Athletics (31)
- Basketball (2) ^{a}
- Boxing (10)
- Cycling (6) ^{b}
- Football (1)
- Netball (1) ^{a}
- Rugby union (1)
- Swimming (19)
- Table tennis (3) ^{c}
- Tennis (3) ^{c}
- Volleyball (2)
- Weightlifting (7)
Note: A number in parentheses indicates how many medal events were contested in that sport (where known).

== Medal table ==
In a significant turnaround of fortunes backed by French government investment, New Caledonia took the mantle at the top of the medal table from Fiji and French Polynesia obtained third position.

Rank	Nation	Gold	Silver	Bronze	Total
1	New Caledonia (NCL)	39	30	30	99
2	Fiji (FIJ)	19	23	17	59
3	French Polynesia (PYF)	13	8	9	30
4	Papua New Guinea (PNG)	5	11	13	29
5	Western Samoa (WSM)	4	4	0	8
6	Nauru (NRU)	4	2	0	6
7	Tonga (TON)	1	0	1	2
8	Cook Islands (COK)	1	0	0	1
9	American Samoa (ASA)	0	4	1	5
10	Wallis and Futuna (WLF)	0	2	12	14
11	Solomon Islands (SOL)	0	1	1	2
12	New Hebrides	0	0	2	2
13	Guam (GUM)	0	0	1	1
Totals (13 entries)		86	85	87	258

== See also ==
- Athletics at the 1966 South Pacific Games
- Football at the 1966 South Pacific Games
- Rugby union at the 1966 South Pacific Games

== Notes ==
^a Men's and women's basketball (five-a-side) competitions were held. A women's netball competition (seven-a-side) was also held.

^b A 100 km individual road race and 70 km team road race were held, as well as events for 1 km time trial, 4 km individual pursuit, 1 km sprint, and 4 km Olympic pursuit.

^c The sports of tennis and table tennis had three competitions each. These were all team events (i.e. competitions for men's, women's and mixed teams).

== Sources ==
- "South Pacific Games". Pacific Islands Monthly. 28 (1). Pacific Publications: 5–6, 23–36, 125–128. 1967.
- South Pacific Games Results. Oceania Sport Information Centre (Report). 1966. Archived from the original on 28 October 2015.
