= 1963 South Pacific Games =

South Pacific Games in Suva, Fiji

- Host city: Suva
- Country: Fiji
- Nations: 13
- Athletes: 646
- Events: 10 sports 58 medal events
- Opening: 29 August 1963
- Closing: 8 September 1963
- Opened by: Sir Kenneth Maddocks, Governor of Fiji

The 1st South Pacific Games (Fijian: 1 ni Qito ena Ceva ni Pasifika), also known as Suva 1963, held from 29 August to 9 September 1963 in Suva, Fiji, was the first edition of the South Pacific Games. The multisport games were established to engender bonds of friendship amongst peoples in the Pacific, after an idea originated by Dr A.H. Sahu Khan was adopted by the South Pacific Commission. At a meeting of nine Territories, held in Nouméa during March 1961, Fiji was awarded the honour of hosting the first Games.

== Participating countries ==
Thirteen Pacific nations or territories, and 646 competitors, participated in the Games:

- American Samoa (91)
- Cook Islands (25)
- Fiji (176)
- French Polynesia (68)
- Gilbert and Ellice Islands (15)
- Nauru (18)
- New Caledonia (76)
- New Hebrides (30)
- Niue (17)
- Papua and New Guinea (86)^{*}
- Solomon Islands (27)
- Tonga (47)
- Western Samoa (69)
Note: A number in parentheses indicate the size of a country's team (athletes and officials, where known).

== Sports ==
Ten sports were contested at the 1963 South Pacific Games:

- Athletics (29) ^{a}
- Basketball (1) ^{b}
- Boxing (8) ^{c}
- Football (1)
- Netball (1) ^{b}
- Rugby union (1)
- Swimming (14)
- Table tennis (1) ^{d}
- Tennis (1) ^{d}
- Volleyball (1) ^{e}
Note: Numbers in parentheses indicate the number of medal events contested in each sport (where known).

== Final medal table ==
The home nation, Fiji, easily topped the (unofficial) medal tally:^{†}

Rank	Nation	Gold	Silver	Bronze	Total
1	Fiji	33^{‡}	23	26^{§}	82^{†}
2	Papua and New Guinea	9	11^{‡}	11	31^{†}
3	New Caledonia	7	9	11	27
4	French Polynesia	4	2	4	10
5	Tonga	2	4	2	8
6	American Samoa	1	2	3^{§}	7^{†}
7	Cook Islands	2	3	0	5
8	Western Samoa	0	1	2	3
9	Gilbert and Ellice Islands	0	1	1	2
10	New Hebrides	0	1	0	1
Totals^{†}		58^{†}	57^{†}	60^{†}	175^{†}

The host country is highlighted in lavender blue

== Calendar ==
The following table provides a summary of the competition schedule.

OC	Opening ceremony	●	Event competitions	1	Event finals	CC	Closing ceremony

August and September 1963	29 Thu	30 Fri	31 Sat	1 Sun	2 Mon	3 Tue	4 Wed	5 Thu	6 Fri	7 Sat	Gold medals
Ceremonies	OC									CC	
Athletics			8		8		13				29
Basketball	●	●	●		●	●	●	1			1
Boxing					●		●		8		8
Football	●	●		●					●	1	1
Netball		●	●		●	●	1				1
Rugby union		●	●			●		●		1	1
Swimming		●	5		●	4		5			14
Table tennis		●	●	●	1		●				1
Tennis	●	●	●	●	●	●	●	●	1		1
Volleyball						●	●	●	1		2
Total gold medals	0	0	13	0	9	4	14	6	10	2	58
Cumulative total	0	0	13	13	22	26	40	46	56	58	58

== See also ==
- Athletics at the 1963 South Pacific Games
- Basketball at the 1963 South Pacific Games
- Football at the 1963 South Pacific Games
- Rugby union at the 1963 South Pacific Games

== Notes ==
^* The Games official report listed the PNG contingent at 86 (78 competitors and 8 officials), although the Canberra Times reported a team of 93 (competitors and officials).

^† The medal table published on the Pacific Games Council webpage (as at May 2015), counts four extra medals (two for Fiji and one each for PNG and American Samoa) that were not actually awarded according to the Official Report and Results published in 1963. The medal columns for these countries have been marked up with a (blue background) in the table above with those counts revised down. The totals on the right and at the bottom of the table are also amended to account for this change.

^‡ The swimming medal totals for Fiji and PNG have been amended to exclude the unofficial 3 × 110 yd medley relay for women for which medals were not awarded, although Fiji and PNG finished first and second respectively.

^§ The boxing medal totals for American Samoa and Fiji have been amended to exclude two semifinalists who were disqualified in their respective semifinal bouts and, as such, did not receive a bronze medal; S. Tinoe from American Samoa in the featherweight class, and M. Delai from Fiji in the light-heavyweight class.

^a Track and field athletics: There were 29 events in total; 19 for men and 10 for women. In the women's 4 x 100 metres relay, only a gold medal was awarded (to Fiji). The remaining teams were disqualified.

^b The game of "women's basketball" in the early 1960s often referred to the sport now known as netball. A recap of the 1963 results published in the Pacific Islands Monthly in 1969 does not mention netball but records that Fiji won the women's basketball competition. The official FIBA basketball record indicates that only a men's competition was held in 1963. A summary of the SPG netball competitions as reported by Islands Business in 1990 shows that Fiji won the netball title in 1963.

^c Boxing: Although there were ten weight divisions, medals were only awarded in eight of them. Fiji made the only nominations in the flyweight and heavyweight classes and had put two boxers in each division to ensure a contest. J. Roba and M. Mate in the flyweight, and V. Dikidikiliti and P. Kali in the heavyweight, were awarded silver cups in lieu of medals.

^d Tennis and table tennis were contested as mixed team sports on a knock-out basis, with each sport having only one gold medal awarded.

^e Volleyball was held as a men's competition only.

== Sources ==
- 1963 South Pacific Games: Official Report and Results. Oceania Sport Information Centre (Report). Archived from the original on 28 October 2015.
