= Vanuatu national football team results =

The Vanuatu national football team represents Vanuatu in association football and is controlled by the Vanuatu Football Federation (VFF), the governing body of the sport in the country. Before joining Fédération Internationale de Football Association (FIFA) and the Oceania Football Confederation (OFC), it played its first match as Vanuatu at the 1981 South Pacific Mini Games – a 13–1 win against Western Samoa.

From a total of 191 matches, Vanuatu has won 64, drawn 29 and lost 98, scoring 344 goals and conceding 378. Prior to independence from France and the United Kingdom, the national team played 37 matches as the New Hebrides. Its combined record is 228 matches played, 72 won, 32 drawn and 124 lost, scoring 407 and conceding 486.

In 1988, the VFF joined both FIFA and the OFC and the national team began competing in the qualifying stages of the FIFA World Cup and the OFC Men's Nations Cup. During their first qualifying campaign for the 1994 FIFA World Cup in summer 1992, Vanuatu lost both their matches against New Zealand.

Vanuatu achieved their best result as hosts of the 2024 OFC Men's Nations Cup. After advancing from the group stage as group runners-up, they defeated co-hosts Fiji 2–1 in the semi-finals to reach the final for the first time. However, goals Cameron Howieson, Jesse Randall and Max Mata saw New Zealand win 3–0 and Vanuatu finished runners-up. Richard Iwai is Vanuatu's top goalscorer. After scoring twice at the 2007 South Pacific Games, Iwai has scored a total of 20 goals in 34 caps between 2000 and 2011.

== Key ==
Key to matches

- Att.=Match attendance
- (H)=Home ground
- (A)=Away ground
- (N)=Neutral ground

Key to record by opponent

- Pld=Games played
- W=Games won
- D=Games drawn
- L=Games lost
- GF=Goals for
- GA=Goals against

== Results ==
Vanuatu's score is shown first in each case.

No.	Date	Venue	Opponents	Score	Competition	Vanuatu scorers	Att.	Ref.
38	7 July 1981	Lawson Tama Stadium, Honiara (N)	Western Samoa	13–1	1981 South Pacific Mini Games	P. Waoute (7), R. Waoute (2), Korikalo (3), Roquara	—	
39	8 July 1981	Lawson Tama Stadium, Honiara (N)	New Caledonia	2–2	1981 South Pacific Mini Games	P. Waoute, R. Waoute	—	
40	9 July 1981	Lawson Tama Stadium, Honiara (N)	Tahiti	1–1	1981 South Pacific Mini Games	P. Waoute	—	
41	10 July 1981	SIPL, Honiara (N)	Fiji	1–1	1981 South Pacific Mini Games	Kalsakau	—	
42	11 July 1981	Lawson Tama Stadium, Honiara (N)	Solomon Islands	1–2	1981 South Pacific Mini Games	P. Waoute	—	
43	13 July 1981	Lawson Tama Stadium, Honiara (N)	Papua New Guinea	2–3	1981 South Pacific Mini Games	Roquara, P. Waoute	—	
44	15 July 1981	Lawson Tama Stadium, Honiara (N)	Papua New Guinea	0–1	1981 South Pacific Mini Games		—	
45	August 1983	Vanuatu (H)	Tahiti	1–1	Friendly		—	
46	August 1983	Vanuatu (H)	Tahiti	1–5	Friendly		—	
47	August 1983	Vanuatu (H)	Tahiti	1–6	Friendly		—	
48	22 August 1983	Apia (N)	Fiji	0–6	1983 South Pacific Games		—	
49	26 August 1983	Apia (N)	New Caledonia	2–6	1983 South Pacific Games		—	
—	September 1983	Apia (N)	Solomon Islands	–	1983 South Pacific Games		—	
50	9 December 1987	Nouméa (N)	Wallis and Futuna	6–1	1987 South Pacific Games	Unknown	—	
51	10 December 1987	Nouméa (N)	American Samoa	7–0	1987 South Pacific Games	Unknown	—	
52	12 December 1987	Nouméa (N)	Papua New Guinea	1–1	1987 South Pacific Games	Unknown	—	
53	15 December 1987	Nouméa (N)	Tahiti	1–2	1987 South Pacific Games	Unknown	—	
54	17 December 1987	Nouméa (N)	New Caledonia	0–6	1987 South Pacific Games		—	
55	19 December 1987	Nouméa (N)	Papua New Guinea	1–3	1987 South Pacific Games		—	
56	23 October 1988	Solomon Islands (N)	New Caledonia	1–6	1988 Melanesia Cup	Unknown	—	
57	24 October 1988	Solomon Islands (N)	Fiji	0–8	1988 Melanesia Cup		—	
58	25 October 1988	Solomon Islands (N)	Solomon Islands	0–5	1988 Melanesia Cup		—	
59	26 October 1988	Solomon Islands (N)	New Caledonia	1–0	1988 Melanesia Cup	Unknown	—	
60	28 October 1989	Fiji (N)	Solomon Islands	0–2	1989 Melanesia Cup		—	
61	30 October 1989	Fiji (N)	Fiji	1–2	1989 Melanesia Cup	Unknown	—	
62	31 October 1989	Fiji (N)	Papua New Guinea	0–3	1989 Melanesia Cup		—	
63	3 November 1989	Fiji (N)	New Caledonia	1–5	1989 Melanesia Cup	Unknown	—	
64	1 November 1990	Nouméa (N)	New Caledonia	1–0	1990 Melanesia Cup	Unknown	—	
65	3 November 1990	Nouméa (N)	Solomon Islands	1–1	1990 Melanesia Cup	Unknown	—	
66	5 November 1990	Nouméa (N)	Papua New Guinea	1–0	1990 Melanesia Cup	Unknown	—	
67	6 November 1990	La Foa (N)	Fiji	1–1	1990 Melanesia Cup	Unknown	—	
68	9 September 1991	Sir Ignatius Kilage Stadium, Lae (N)	Wallis and Futuna	4–0	1991 South Pacific Games	Unknown	—	
69	11 September 1991	Sir Ignatius Kilage Stadium, Lae (N)	Papua New Guinea	1–0	1991 South Pacific Games	Unknown	—	
70	13 September 1991	Sir Ignatius Kilage Stadium, Lae (N)	Solomon Islands	0–3	1991 South Pacific Games		—	
71	17 September 1991	Sir Ignatius Kilage Stadium, Lae (N)	Fiji	1–3 (a.e.t.)	1991 South Pacific Games	Vari	—	
72	19 September 1991	Sir Ignatius Kilage Stadium, Lae (N)	New Caledonia	0–3	1991 South Pacific Games		—	
73	27 June 1992	Port Vila (H)	New Zealand	1–4	1994 FIFA World Cup qualification	Vatú	—	
74	1 July 1992	Auckland (A)	New Zealand	0–8	1994 FIFA World Cup qualification		—	
75	13 July 1992	Vanuatu (H)	Tahiti	2–1	Friendly	Unknown	—	
76	20 July 1992	Vanuatu (H)	Tahiti	1–2	Friendly	Unknown	—	
77	25 July 1992	Korman Stadium, Port Vila (N)	New Caledonia	0–1	1992 Melanesia Cup		—	
78	27 July 1992	Korman Stadium, Port Vila (N)	Solomon Islands	1–3	1992 Melanesia Cup	Carlot	—	
79	30 July 1992	Korman Stadium, Port Vila (N)	Fiji	0–2	1992 Melanesia Cup		—	
80	12 September 1992	Suva (A)	Fiji	0–3	1994 FIFA World Cup qualification		—	
81	26 September 1992	Port Vila (H)	Fiji	0–3	1994 FIFA World Cup qualification		—	
82	7 December 1993	Vanuatu (N)	Tonga	3–0	1993 South Pacific Mini Games	Unknown	—	
83	10 December 1993	Vanuatu (N)	New Caledonia	1–1	1993 South Pacific Mini Games	Unknown	—	
84	13 December 1993	Vanuatu (N)	Papua New Guinea	1–0	1993 South Pacific Mini Games	Unknown	—	
85	14 December 1993	Vanuatu (N)	Fiji	0–2	1993 South Pacific Mini Games		—	
86	16 December 1993	Vanuatu (N)	New Caledonia	1–2	1993 South Pacific Mini Games	Unknown	—	
87	5 July 1994	Solomon Islands (N)	New Caledonia	2–3	1994 Melanesia Cup	Unknown	—	
88	6 July 1994	Solomon Islands (N)	Solomon Islands	0–4	1994 Melanesia Cup		—	
89	7 July 1994	Solomon Islands (N)	Papua New Guinea	1–1	1994 Melanesia Cup	Unknown	—	
90	8 July 1994	Solomon Islands (N)	Fiji	2–4	1994 Melanesia Cup	Unknown	—	
91	16 August 1995	French Polynesia (N)	Guam	6–0	1995 South Pacific Games	Unknown	—	
92	20 August 1995	French Polynesia (N)	Papua New Guinea	3–0	1995 South Pacific Games	Unknown	—	
93	22 August 1995	French Polynesia (N)	Fiji	1–3	1995 South Pacific Games	Unknown	—	
94	24 August 1995	French Polynesia (N)	Tahiti	0–3	1995 South Pacific Games		—	
95	26 August 1995	French Polynesia (N)	Fiji	0–3	1995 South Pacific Games		—	
96	18 September 1996	Sir Ignatius Kilage Stadium, Lae (N)	Solomon Islands	1–1	1998 FIFA World Cup qualification	Naukoot	—	
97	20 September 1996	Sir Ignatius Kilage Stadium, Lae (N)	Papua New Guinea	1–2	1998 FIFA World Cup qualification	Garo	—	
98	7 September 1998	Espiritu Santo (N)	Fiji	1–2	1998 Melanesia Cup	Unknown	—	
99	8 September 1998	Espiritu Santo (N)	Papua New Guinea	1–1	1998 Melanesia Cup	Unknown	—	
100	10 September 1998	Espiritu Santo (N)	Solomon Islands	3–1	1998 Melanesia Cup	Unknown	—	
101	12 September 1998	Espiritu Santo (N)	New Caledonia	3–2	1998 Melanesia Cup	Unknown	—	
102	28 September 1998	Lang Park, Brisbane (N)	New Zealand	1–8	1998 OFC Nations Cup	Roronamahava	—	
103	30 September 1998	Lang Park, Brisbane (N)	Tahiti	1–5	1998 OFC Nations Cup	Rarai	—	
104	10 April 2000	Suva (N)	Solomon Islands	1–3	2000 Melanesia Cup	V. Noel	—	
105	11 April 2000	Suva (N)	Fiji	1–4	2000 Melanesia Cup	Iwai	—	
106	13 April 2000	Suva (N)	New Caledonia	6–0	2000 Melanesia Cup	Chilia, Reuben, Iwai (2), H. George (2)	—	
107	15 April 2000	Suva (N)	Papua New Guinea	4–1	2000 Melanesia Cup	C. Berry, N. Vari (2), Reuben	—	
108	12 June 2000	New Caledonia (A)	New Caledonia	1–3	Friendly	Unknown	—	
109	15 June 2000	New Caledonia (A)	New Caledonia	0–1	Friendly		—	
110	21 June 2000	Stade Pater Te Hono Nui, Pirae (N)	New Zealand	1–3	2000 OFC Nations Cup	Iwai	500	
111	23 June 2000	Stade Pater Te Hono Nui, Pirae (N)	Tahiti	3–2	2000 OFC Nations Cup	Ben, Iwai, Tura	300	
112	25 June 2000	Stade Pater Te Hono Nui, Pirae (N)	Australia	0–1	2000 OFC Nations Cup		300	
113	28 June 2000	Stade Pater Te Hono Nui, Pirae (N)	Solomon Islands	1–2	2000 OFC Nations Cup	Bibi	300	
114	4 June 2001	North Harbour Stadium, Auckland (N)	Tahiti	1–6	2002 FIFA World Cup qualification	Lauru	400	
115	6 June 2001	North Harbour Stadium, Auckland (N)	Cook Islands	8–1	2002 FIFA World Cup qualification	Iwai (4), Lauru, Hattone, Maki, Waiwai	600	
116	8 June 2001	North Harbour Stadium, Auckland (N)	Solomon Islands	2–7	2002 FIFA World Cup qualification	Iwai (2)	1,674	
117	13 June 2001	North Harbour Stadium, Auckland (N)	New Zealand	0–7	2002 FIFA World Cup qualification		1,500	
118	6 July 2002	Mount Smart Stadium, Auckland (N)	Australia	0–2	2002 OFC Nations Cup		1,000	
119	8 July 2002	Mount Smart Stadium, Auckland (N)	Fiji	1–0	2002 OFC Nations Cup	Marango	800	
120	10 July 2002	Mount Smart Stadium, Auckland (N)	New Caledonia	1–0	2002 OFC Nations Cup	Iwai	500	
121	12 July 2002	Mount Smart Stadium, Auckland (N)	New Zealand	0–3	2002 OFC Nations Cup		1,000	
122	14 July 2002	Mount Smart Stadium, Auckland (N)	Tahiti	0–1	2002 OFC Nations Cup		1,000	
123	30 June 2003	National Stadium, Suva (N)	Fiji	0–0	2003 South Pacific Games		—	
124	1 July 2003	National Stadium, Suva (N)	Solomon Islands	2–2	2003 South Pacific Games	Mermer, Qorig	—	
125	3 July 2003	National Stadium, Suva (N)	Tuvalu	1–0	2003 South Pacific Games	Tabe	700	
126	7 July 2003	Churchill Park, Lautoka (N)	Kiribati	18–0	2003 South Pacific Games	Mermer (4), Chilia (4), Iwai (5), Tabe, Vava, Thomsen, Demas, Maki	2,000	
127	9 July 2003	Churchill Park, Lautoka (N)	New Caledonia	1–1 (3–4p)	2003 South Pacific Games	Maki	7,000	
128	11 July 2003	National Stadium, Suva (N)	Tahiti	1–0	2003 South Pacific Games	Mermer	6,000	
129	2 April 2004	Port Vila (H)	Solomon Islands	1–2	Friendly	Chilia	—	
130	6 April 2004	Port Vila (H)	Solomon Islands	1–2	Friendly	Unknown	—	
131	10 May 2004	Toleofoa Joseph Blatter Soccer Complex, Apia (N)	Papua New Guinea	1–1	2006 FIFA World Cup qualification	Lauru	500	
132	12 May 2004	Toleofoa Joseph Blatter Soccer Complex, Apia (N)	American Samoa	9–1	2006 FIFA World Cup qualification	Qorig (2), Mermer (3), Poida, Chilia, Maleb (2)	400	
133	15 May 2004	Toleofoa Joseph Blatter Soccer Complex, Apia (N)	Samoa	3–0	2006 FIFA World Cup qualification	Mermer, Chilia, Maleb	650	
134	19 May 2004	Toleofoa Joseph Blatter Soccer Complex, Apia (N)	Fiji	3–0	2006 FIFA World Cup qualification	Thomsen, Lauru (2)	200	
135	29 May 2004	Marden Sports Complex, Adelaide (N)	Solomon Islands	0–1	2004 OFC Nations Cup		200	
136	31 May 2004	Hindmarsh Stadium, Adelaide (N)	Fiji	0–1	2004 OFC Nations Cup		500	
137	2 June 2004	Hindmarsh Stadium, Adelaide (N)	New Zealand	4–2	2004 OFC Nations Cup	Chilia, Bibi, Maleb, Qorig	356	
138	4 June 2004	Hindmarsh Stadium, Adelaide (N)	Australia	0–3	2004 OFC Nations Cup		4,000	
139	6 June 2004	Marden Sports Complex, Adelaide (N)	Tahiti	1–2	2004 OFC Nations Cup	Iwai	300	
140	17 July 2007	Stade Numa-Daly Magenta, Nouméa (A)	New Caledonia	3–5	Friendly	Gete, K. Masauvakalo, S. Soromon	—	
141	19 July 2007	Stade Numa-Daly Magenta, Nouméa (A)	New Caledonia	2–0	Friendly	Naprapol, Mermer	—	
142	25 August 2007	Toleofoa Joseph Blatter Soccer Complex, Apia (N)	Samoa	4–0	2007 South Pacific Games	Iwai, Naprapol, Poida, S. Soromon	300	
143	29 August 2007	Toleofoa Joseph Blatter Soccer Complex, Apia (N)	American Samoa	15–0	2007 South Pacific Games	Poida, Mermer (4), Sakama (3), Chichirua, Iwai, Tomake, S. Soromon (4)	200	
144	1 September 2007	Toleofoa Joseph Blatter Soccer Complex, Apia (N)	Solomon Islands	0–2	2007 South Pacific Games		1,000	
145	3 September 2007	Toleofoa Joseph Blatter Soccer Complex, Apia (N)	Tonga	4–1	2007 South Pacific Games	S. Soromon (3), Maleb	50	
146	5 September 2007	Toleofoa Joseph Blatter Soccer Complex, Apia (N)	Fiji	0–3	2007 South Pacific Games		600	
147	7 September 2007	Toleofoa Joseph Blatter Soccer Complex, Apia (N)	Solomon Islands	2–0	2007 South Pacific Games	S. Soromon, Sakama	200	
148	17 November 2007	Port Vila Municipal Stadium, Port Vila (H)	New Zealand	1–2	2008 OFC Nations Cup	Naprapol	8,000	
149	21 November 2007	Wellington Regional Stadium, Wellington (A)	New Zealand	1–4	2008 OFC Nations Cup	Sakama	2,500	
150	14 June 2008	Port Vila Municipal Stadium, Port Vila (H)	New Caledonia	1–1	2008 OFC Nations Cup	Mermer	4,000	
151	21 June 2008	Stade Numa-Daly Magenta, Nouméa (A)	New Caledonia	0–3	2008 OFC Nations Cup		2,700	
152	7 July 2008	Solomon Islands (A)	Solomon Islands	2–1	Friendly	Unknown	—	
153	6 September 2008	Govind Park, Ba (A)	Fiji	0–2	2008 OFC Nations Cup		3,000	
154	10 September 2008	Port Vila Municipal Stadium, Port Vila (H)	Fiji	2–1	2008 OFC Nations Cup	Sakama, Malas	1,200	
155	24 January 2011	Vanuatu (H)	New Caledonia	0–0	Friendly		—	
156	7 July 2011	Lawson Tama Stadium, Honiara (A)	Solomon Islands	1–2	Friendly	Michel	—	
157	9 July 2011	Lawson Tama Stadium, Honiara (A)	Solomon Islands	0–0	Friendly		—	
158	13 July 2011	Subrail Park, Labasa (A)	Fiji	0–2	Friendly		—	
159	15 July 2011	Churchill Park, Lautoka (A)	Fiji	2–1	Friendly	Wilson, Tasso	—	
160	27 July 2011	Korman Stadium, Port Vila (H)	Solomon Islands	0–0	Friendly		6,000	
161	30 July 2011	Korman Stadium, Port Vila (H)	Solomon Islands	2–0	Friendly	Wilson, Tangis	3,000	
162	27 August 2011	Stade Rivière Salée, Nouméa (N)	New Caledonia	0–5	2011 Pacific Games		—	
163	30 August 2011	Stade Rivière Salée, Nouméa (N)	Tuvalu	5–1	2011 Pacific Games	J. Kaltak (4), Yelou	—	
164	1 September 2011	Stade Rivière Salée, Nouméa (N)	Solomon Islands	1–0	2011 Pacific Games	J. Kaltak	—	
165	3 September 2011	Stade Rivière Salée, Nouméa (N)	Guam	4–1	2011 Pacific Games	Tangis, Tasso, J. Kaltak, Tari	—	
166	5 September 2011	Stade Rivière Salée, Nouméa (N)	American Samoa	8–0	2011 Pacific Games	Michel (2), Garae, J. Kaltak (3), M. Kaltak, Sese Ala	—	
167	1 June 2012	Lawson Tama Stadium, Honiara (N)	New Caledonia	2–5	2012 OFC Nations Cup	Tasso, Naprapol	7,000	
168	3 June 2012	Lawson Tama Stadium, Honiara (N)	Samoa	5–0	2012 OFC Nations Cup	Naprapol, B. Kaltak, Malas, Tasso, Vava	2,200	
169	5 June 2012	Lawson Tama Stadium, Honiara (N)	Tahiti	1–4	2012 OFC Nations Cup	Tasso	1,000	
170	7 November 2015	Port Vila Municipal Stadium, Port Vila (H)	Fiji	1–1	Friendly	Tangis	—	
171	10 November 2015	Port Vila Municipal Stadium, Port Vila (H)	Fiji	2–1	Friendly	B. Kaltak, Nicholls	—	
172	26 March 2016	Port Vila Municipal Stadium, Port Vila (H)	New Caledonia	2–1	Friendly	F. Masauvakalo, B. Kaltak	—	
173	28 May 2016	Sir John Guise Stadium, Port Moresby (N)	Solomon Islands	0–1	2016 OFC Nations Cup		1,611	
174	31 May 2016	Sir John Guise Stadium, Port Moresby (N)	New Zealand	0–5	2016 OFC Nations Cup		520	
175	4 June 2016	Sir John Guise Stadium, Port Moresby (N)	Fiji	3–2	2016 OFC Nations Cup	Fred, F. Masauvakalo, B. Kaltak	851	
176	28 July 2017	Lawson Tama Stadium, Honiara (A)	Solomon Islands	0–0	Friendly		—	
177	23 November 2017	Korman Stadium, Port Vila (H)	Estonia	0–1	Friendly		—	
178	2 December 2017	Port Vila Municipal Stadium, Port Vila (N)	New Caledonia	2–1	2017 Pacific Mini Games	Saniel, A. Soromon	3,000	
179	6 December 2017	Korman Stadium, Port Vila (N)	Tonga	5–0	2017 Pacific Mini Games	Ruben, A. Soromon (2), T. Kaltak (2)	6,000	
180	9 December 2017	Port Vila Municipal Stadium, Port Vila (N)	Fiji	1–1	2017 Pacific Mini Games	A. Soromon	7,000	
181	12 December 2017	Port Vila Municipal Stadium, Port Vila (N)	Tuvalu	10–0	2017 Pacific Mini Games	Tangis (4), Molivakarua, A. Soromon (2), T. Kaltak (3)	4,000	
182	15 December 2017	Port Vila Municipal Stadium, Port Vila (N)	Solomon Islands	3–2	2017 Pacific Mini Games	Tangis, Molivakarua, Kalo	6,000	
183	14 November 2018	Korman Stadium, Port Vila (H)	New Caledonia	0–1	Friendly		—	
184	17 November 2018	Korman Stadium, Port Vila (H)	New Caledonia	2–2	Friendly	Bob, A. Soromon	—	
185	18 March 2019	Lawson Tama Stadium, Honiara (A)	Solomon Islands	1–3	Friendly	Tangis	—	
186	4 June 2019	Korman Stadium, Port Vila (H)	Tahiti	2–0	Friendly	Bob, T. Kaltak	—	
187	10 June 2019	Korman Stadium, Port Vila (H)	Fiji	0–0	Friendly		—	
188	15 June 2019	Gelora Bung Karno Stadium, Jakarta (A)	Indonesia	0–6	Friendly		10,000	
189	10 July 2019	National Soccer Stadium, Apia (N)	Papua New Guinea	0–2	2019 Pacific Games		1,000	
190	15 July 2019	National Soccer Stadium, Apia (N)	Tonga	14–0	2019 Pacific Games	Molivakarua, Kalo, Natou, T. Kaltak (5), Cooper, Coulon, Nicholls (4)	100	
191	18 July 2019	National Soccer Stadium, Apia (N)	Samoa	11–0	2019 Pacific Games	Cooper (4), T. Kaltak (4), Bob, Nicholls, B. Kaltak	500	
192	10 March 2022	Qatar University Stadium, Doha (N)	Fiji	0–3	Friendly		—	
—	17 March 2022	Al Arabi Stadium, Doha (N)	Tahiti	–	2022 FIFA World Cup qualification		—	
—	20 March 2022	Al Arabi Stadium, Doha (N)	Solomon Islands	–	2022 FIFA World Cup qualification		—	
—	24 March 2022	Qatar SC Stadium, Doha (N)	Cook Islands	–	2022 FIFA World Cup qualification		—	
193	27 March 2022	Hamad bin Khalifa Stadium, Doha (N)	Fiji	1–2	Friendly	Batick	—	
194	27 September 2022	Korman Stadium, Port Vila (N)	Papua New Guinea	0–1	2022 MSG Prime Minister's Cup		—	
195	20 March 2023	Churchill Park, Lautoka (A)	Fiji	2–1	Friendly	Spokeyjack, Aru	—	
196	23 March 2023	Churchill Park, Lautoka (N)	Solomon Islands	0–2	Friendly		—	
197	9 June 2023	Kalinga Stadium, Bhubaneswar (N)	Lebanon	1–3	2023 Intercontinental Cup	Wohale	—	
198	12 June 2023	Kalinga Stadium, Bhubaneswar (N)	India	0–1	2023 Intercontinental Cup		—	
199	15 June 2023	Kalinga Stadium, Bhubaneswar (N)	Mongolia	1–0	2023 Intercontinental Cup	Gantuya (o.g.)	—	
200	8 October 2023	Stade Numa-Daly Magenta, Nouméa (N)	New Caledonia	0–4	2023 MSG Prime Minister's Cup		—	
201	11 October 2023	Stade Yoshida, Koné (N)	Solomon Islands	0–1	2023 MSG Prime Minister's Cup		—	
202	14 October 2023	Stade Numa-Daly Magenta, Nouméa (N)	Papua New Guinea	1–0	2023 MSG Prime Minister's Cup	Mansale	—	
203	20 November 2023	Lawson Tama Stadium, Honiara (N)	Tuvalu	6–0	2023 Pacific Games	Kalotang (2), Tenene (2), Alefaio (o.g.), Moses	—	
204	23 November 2023	Lawson Tama Stadium, Honiara (N)	Papua New Guinea	1–1	2023 Pacific Games	A. Soromon	—	
205	28 November 2023	Lawson Tama Stadium, Honiara (N)	New Caledonia	0–1	2023 Pacific Games		—	
206	1 December 2023	Lawson Tama Stadium, Honiara (N)	Fiji	2–4	2023 Pacific Games	A. Soromon (2)	—	
207	21 March 2024	Prince Abdullah Al-Faisal Sports City, Jeddah (N)	Guinea	0–6	2024 FIFA Series		—	
208	26 March 2024	Prince Abdullah Al-Faisal Sports City, Jeddah (N)	Brunei	2–3	2024 FIFA Series	Kalo, Iawak	—	
209	15 June 2024	VFF Freshwater Stadium, Port Vila (N)	Solomon Islands	1–0	2024 OFC Nations Cup	Tangis	5,000	
210	21 June 2024	VFF Freshwater Stadium, Port Vila (N)	New Zealand	0–4	2024 OFC Nations Cup		7,200	
211	27 June 2024	VFF Freshwater Stadium, Port Vila (N)	Fiji	2–1	2024 OFC Nations Cup	Spokeyjack, Thomas	5,200	
212	30 June 2024	VFF Freshwater Stadium, Port Vila (N)	New Zealand	0–3	2024 OFC Nations Cup		10,000	
213	12 October 2024	VFF Freshwater Stadium, Port Vila (N)	Samoa	4–1	2026 FIFA World Cup qualification	Cooper, Alick (2), Kalo	3,000	
214	15 November 2024	Waikato Stadium, Hamilton (N)	New Zealand	1–8	2026 FIFA World Cup qualification	Tasip	10,113	
215	18 November 2024	Mount Smart Stadium, Auckland (N)	Tahiti	0–2	2026 FIFA World Cup qualification		395	
216	9 December 2024	Lawson Tama Stadium, Honiara (N)	Solomon Islands	1–4	2024 MSG Prime Minister's Cup	King	—	
217	12 December 2024	Lawson Tama Stadium, Honiara (N)	Fiji	1–1	2024 MSG Prime Minister's Cup	Saniel	—	
218	21 December 2024	Lawson Tama Stadium, Honiara (N)	Papua New Guinea	1–2	2024 MSG Prime Minister's Cup	J. Kaltak	—	
219	17 November 2025	PNG Football Stadium, Port Moresby (N)	Fiji	2–0	2025 MSG Prime Minister's Cup	K. Kaltack, Iawak	—	
220	20 November 2025	PNG Football Stadium, Port Moresby (N)	Solomon Islands	2–1	2025 MSG Prime Minister's Cup	Malakai, Loloa	—	
221	23 November 2025	Sir John Guise Stadium, Port Moresby (N)	Papua New Guinea	2–2 (5–4p)	2025 MSG Prime Minister's Cup		—	
222	6 June 2026	VFF Freshwater Stadium, Port Vila (H)	Fiji	2–1	Friendly	Saniel, Dunn (o.g.)	—	
223	9 June 2026	VFF Freshwater Stadium, Port Vila (H)	Fiji	2–2	Friendly	Soromon, Saniel	—	
224	18 September 2026	National Stadium, Suva (N)	Papua New Guinea	1–2	2026 MSG Prime Minister's Cup	T. Kaltak	—	
225	21 September 2026	National Stadium, Suva (N)	Fiji	1–0	2026 MSG Prime Minister's Cup	K. Kaltak	—	
226	24 September 2026	National Stadium, Suva (N)	Solomon Islands	3–3	2026 MSG Prime Minister's Cup	Malakai, T. Kaltak, Bule	—	
227	27 September 2026	National Stadium, Suva (N)	New Caledonia	4–1	2026 MSG Prime Minister's Cup	T. Kaltak, Moses, Roqara, Soromon	—	
228	3 October 2026	National Stadium, Suva (N)	Fiji	0–1	2026 MSG Prime Minister's Cup		—	

Notes

1. A: Some sources suggest the Solomon Islands defeated Vanuatu in their final match at the 1983 South Pacific Games but the score is unknown. Both teams had been eliminated from the tournament prior to the match.
2. B: The 1994 Melanesia Cup doubled as qualifiers for the 1996 OFC Nations Cup.
3. C: The 1998 Melanesia Cup doubled as qualifiers for the 1998 OFC Nations Cup.
4. D: The 2000 Melanesia Cup doubled as qualifiers for the 2000 OFC Nations Cup.
5. E: The first round of Oceanian qualifiers for the 2006 FIFA World Cup doubled as qualifiers for the 2004 OFC Nations Cup.
6. F: The 2004 OFC Nations Cup doubled as the second round of qualifiers for the 2006 FIFA World Cup.
7. G: The men's football tournament at the 2007 South Pacific Games doubled as qualifiers for the 2008 OFC Nations Cup and the first round of qualifiers for the 2010 FIFA World Cup.
8. H: The 2008 OFC Nations Cup doubled as the second round of qualifiers for the 2010 FIFA World Cup.
9. I: The 2012 OFC Nations Cup doubled as the second round of qualifiers for the 2014 FIFA World Cup.
10. J: The 2016 OFC Nations Cup doubled as the second round of qualifiers for the 2018 FIFA World Cup.
11. K: Following an outbreak of COVID-19 among the Vanuatu squad, the match against Tahiti during qualifying for the 2022 FIFA World Cup was cancelled. The following day, Vanuatu withdrew from the competition.

== Record by opponent ==
Team	Pld	W	D	L	GF	GA	GD	WPCT
American Samoa	4	4	0	0	39	1	+38	100.00
Australia	3	0	0	3	0	6	−6	0.00
Brunei	1	0	0	1	2	3	−1	0.00
Cook Islands	1	1	0	0	8	1	+7	100.00
Estonia	1	0	0	1	0	1	−1	0.00
Fiji	40	11	8	21	39	78	−39	27.50
Guam	2	2	0	0	10	1	+9	100.00
Guinea	1	0	0	1	0	6	−6	0.00
India	1	0	0	1	0	1	−1	0.00
Indonesia	1	0	0	1	0	6	−6	0.00
Kiribati	1	1	0	0	18	0	+18	100.00
Lebanon	1	0	0	1	1	3	−2	0.00
Mongolia	1	1	0	0	1	0	+1	100.00
New Caledonia	32	9	6	17	42	78	−36	28.13
New Zealand	13	1	0	12	10	61	−51	7.69
Papua New Guinea	21	6	6	9	24	27	−3	28.57
Samoa (Note: Includes results as Western Samoa.)	6	6	0	0	40	2	+38	100.00
Solomon Islands	34	8	7	19	34	63	−29	23.53
Tahiti	17	4	2	11	18	43	−25	23.53
Tonga	4	4	0	0	26	1	+25	100.00
Tuvalu	4	4	0	0	22	1	+21	100.00
Wallis and Futuna	2	2	0	0	10	1	+9	100.00
Total	191	64	29	98	344	384	−40	33.51

Source: Results
