= 2026 MSG Prime Minister's Cup – Men's football tournament =

2026 MSG Prime Minister's Cup
Tournament details
- Host country: Fiji
- City: Suva
- Dates: 18 September–3 October
- Teams: 5 (from 1 confederation)
- Venue: 1 (in 1 host city)

Final positions
- Champions: Fiji (6th title)
- Runners-up: Vanuatu

Tournament statistics
- Matches played: 11
- Goals scored: 34 (3.09 per match)
- Top scorer(s): (Solomon Islands) Javin Wae (Vanuatu) Tony Kaltak (Solomon Islands) Raphael Lea'i (3 goals)

The 2026 MSG Prime Minister's Cup men's football tournament was held from 18 September to 3 October 2026. Fiji will host the competition in Suva at the HFC Bank Stadium. Vanuatu are defending champions after winning the competition for the first time in 2025.

== History ==
Fiji was confirmed as the host of the tournament in December 2025. At the event, it was also announced that the competition would feature other sports and coincide with the Melanesian Cultural Festival for the first time. In August 2026, Papua New Guinea announced that it would not send teams to the tournament because of unpaid allowances, prize money, reimbursements and related commitments outstanding from the 2024 and 2025 competitions. It was believed that Papua New Guinea's men's 2024 and women's 2025 trophies could be handed back as the PNG Sports Foundation had not been paying the nation's fair share as the tournament is funded by the governments, not the football associations. In September 2026, it was announced that the event would feature football and golf tournaments. Papua New Guinea was confirmed as participating in the competition when the schedule was released. Reports indicated that the team had received assurances from the government that all outstanding monies would be paid.

== Format ==
All nations will play each other once in a round-robin format. At the conclusion of the matches, the top two teams will play each other to determine the champion.

== Participating nations ==
- Fiji
- New Caledonia
- Papua New Guinea
- Solomon Islands
- Vanuatu

== Table ==
Pos	Team	Pld	W	D	L	GF	GA	GD	Pts	Qualification
1	Vanuatu	4	2	1	1	9	6	+3	7	Final
2	Fiji (H)	4	2	1	1	7	5	+2	7	Final
3	Solomon Islands	4	1	3	0	9	7	+2	6	
4	Papua New Guinea	4	1	1	2	4	6	−2	4	
5	New Caledonia	4	1	0	3	4	9	−5	3	

(H) Hosts

== Matches ==
=== Matchday 1 ===
18 September 2026
14:00

Papua New Guinea	2–1	Vanuatu
Moses 85'; Vela 89'	Report	T. Kaltak 76'

HFC Bank Stadium, Suva, Fiji
18 September 2026
19:00

Fiji	3–3	Solomon Islands
Krishna 26'; Dau 43'; Dunn 55'	Report	Riugaemai 41' (pen.); Patty 82'; Wae 90+'

HFC Bank Stadium, Suva, Fiji

=== Matchday 2 ===
21 September 2026
16:00

New Caledonia	0–2	Solomon Islands
	Report	Lea'i 76'; Wae 90+3'

HFC Bank Stadium, Suva, Fiji
21 September 2026
19:00

Fiji	0–1	Vanuatu
	Report	K. Kaltak 70'

HFC Bank Stadium, Suva, Fiji

=== Matchday 3 ===
24 September 2026
16:00

Solomon Islands	3–3	Vanuatu
Keana 43'; Lea'i 67'; Wae 85'	Report	Malakai 33'; T. Kaltak 47'; Bule 71'

HFC Bank Stadium, Suva, Fiji
24 September 2026
19:00

Papua New Guinea	1–2	New Caledonia
A. Kepo 18'		Dahite 11'; Read 73'

HFC Bank Stadium, Suva, Fiji

=== Matchday 4 ===
27 September 2026
16:00

Vanuatu	4–1	New Caledonia
T. Kaltak 24'; Moses 79'; Roqara 85'; Soromon 90'		Decoire 15'

HFC Bank Stadium, Suva, Fiji
27 September 2026
19:00

Fiji	2–0	Papua New Guinea
Krishna 18' (pen.); Vasconcellos 24'

HFC Bank Stadium, Suva, Fiji

=== Matchday 5 ===
30 September 2026
16:00

Papua New Guinea	1–1	Solomon Islands
A. Kepo 60'		Lea'i 3' (pen.)

HFC Bank Stadium, Suva, Fiji
30 September 2026
19:00

Fiji	2–1	New Caledonia
Wara 50'; Dau 66'		Read 39'

HFC Bank Stadium, Suva, Fiji

=== Final ===
3 October 2026
16:00

Vanuatu	0–1	Fiji
		Dunn 10'

HFC Bank Stadium, Suva, Fiji

== Goalscorers ==
There were 34 goals scored in 11 matches, for an average of 3.09 goals per match.

3 goals

- (Solomon Islands) Javin Wae
- (Vanuatu) Tony Kaltak
- (Solomon Islands) Raphael Lea'i

2 goals

- (Fiji) Roy Krishna
- (Fiji) Maikah Dau
- (Fiji) Thomas Dunn
- (Papua New Guinea) Ati Kepo
- (New Caledonia) Willy Read

1 goal

- (Fiji) Sterling Vasconcellos
- (Fiji) Scott Wara
- (New Caledonia) Brice Dahite
- (New Caledonia) Cédric Decoire
- (Papua New Guinea) Nalau Moses
- (Papua New Guinea) Ezekiel Vela
- (Solomon Islands) Rooney Riugaemai
- (Solomon Islands) Jayroll Patty
- (Solomon Islands) Don Keana
- (Vanuatu) Kaltfer Kaltak
- (Vanuatu) Andrew Malakai
- (Vanuatu) Jayson Bule
- (Vanuatu) Joe Moses
- (Vanuatu) Edward Roqara
- (Vanuatu) Azariah Soromon
