= Saby =

Saby is both a given name and a surname. Notable people with the name include:

- Bruno Saby (born 1949), French rally driver
- Kasper Såby (born 1974), Danish football player
- Saby Kamalich (1939–2017), Peruvian-Mexican actress
- Saby Natonga (1970), Vanuatuan football manager

== See also ==
- Sæby, Denmark, a town
