= 2025 OFC U-16 Men's Championship =

Tournament details
- Host countries: Qualifying stage: Tonga; Final tournament: Solomon Islands
- Dates: Qualifying stage: 3–9 May 2025; Final tournament: 17–30 August 2025
- Teams: Final tournament: 8 Total: 11 (from 1 confederation)
- Venues: 2 (in 1 host city)

Final positions
- Champions: New Zealand (11th title)
- Runners-up: New Caledonia
- Third place: Fiji
- Fourth place: Papua New Guinea

Tournament statistics
- Matches played: 18
- Goals scored: 65 (3.61 per match)
- Attendance: 11,954 (664 per match)
- Top scorer: (New Zealand) Ben Perez Baldoni (6 goals)
- Best player: (New Zealand) Ethan Dyer
- Best goalkeeper: (New Caledonia) Sylvain Ipeze
- Fair play award: Samoa and Tahiti

The 2025 OFC U-16 Men's Championship was the 22nd edition of the OFC U-16/U-17 Championship, the biennial international youth football championship organised by the Oceania Football Confederation (OFC) for the men's under-16/under-17 national teams of Oceania. The final tournament was played in Honiara, Solomon Islands, from 17 to 30 August 2025. Players born on or after 1 January 2009 are eligible to compete in the tournament.

The top three teams of the tournament qualified for the 2026 FIFA U-17 World Cup in Qatar as the OFC representatives. New Zealand successfully defended the title from 2024.

== Teams ==
All 11 FIFA-affiliated national teams from the OFC entered the tournament, but only 8 played in the final tournament (Note: Papua New Guinea, Vanuatu, Tonga and American Samoa participated only in the qualification stage for a chance to qualify to the tournament; the final winner was Papua New Guinea.)

Note: All appearance statistics include those in the qualifying stage (2016 and 2018).

Team	Appearance	Previous best performance
American Samoa	11th	Group stage (1999, 2001, 2003, 2011, 2015, 2023)
Cook Islands	12th	Quarter-finals (2023)
Fiji	20th	Runners-up (1999, 2024)
New Caledonia	14th	Runners-up (2003, 2013, 2017, 2023)
New Zealand	19th	Champions (1997, 2007, 2009, 2011, 2013, 2015, 2017, 2018, 2023, 2024)
Papua New Guinea	11th	Semi-finals (2017), Fourth place (1986)
Samoa	11th	Quarter-finals (2023)
Solomon Islands (hosts)	11th	Runners-up (1993, 2018)
Tahiti	16th	Runners-up (2007, 2009, 2011, 2015)
Tonga	12th	Quarter-finals (2023)
Vanuatu	17th	Runners-up (2005)

== Venues ==
2025 OFC U-16 Men's Championship is located in Solomon Islands
Honiara
Lawson Tama Stadium	National Stadium
Capacity: 20,000	Capacity: 10,000

== Qualifying stage ==
The draw for the group stage was held 20 March 2025.

=== Tiebreakers ===
Tie-breaking criteria for group play
The ranking of teams in the group stage was determined as follows:
1. Total points;
2. Goal difference in all group matches;
3. Goals scored in all group matches;
4. Head-to-head result between tied teams;
  1. Points in matches among the tied teams;
  2. Goal difference in matches among the tied teams;
  3. Goals scored in matches among the tied teams;
5. Fair play points in all group matches (only one deduction per player, per match):
  - One yellow card: −1 point;
  - Two yellow cards (indirect red card): −3 points;
  - Direct red card: −4 points;
  - Yellow card and direct red card: −5 points;
6. Drawing of lots.

=== Qualifying group ===
Pos	Team	Pld	W	D	L	GF	GA	GD	Pts	Qualification	(Papua New Guinea)	(Tonga)	(Vanuatu)	(American Samoa)
1	Papua New Guinea	3	2	1	0	12	2	+10	7	Qualify for Final tournament	—	5–2	—	—
2	Tonga (H)	3	1	1	1	9	8	+1	4		—	—	2–2	5–1
3	Vanuatu	3	0	3	0	4	4	0	3		0–0	—	—	—
4	American Samoa	3	0	1	2	3	14	−11	1		0–7	—	2–2	—

Source: OFC
(H) Hosts

== Draw ==
The draw for the group stage was held on 20 March with teams seeded into pots based upon their ranking at the 2024 OFC U-16 Men's Championship.

Pot 1	Pot 2	Pot 3
Fiji; New Zealand	Cook Islands; New Caledonia; Samoa; Tahiti	Solomon Islands; Papua New Guinea (Note: The identity of the qualifying winners was not known at the time of the final draw)

== Group stage ==
All times are local, SBT (UTC+11).

=== Group A ===
Pos	Team	Pld	W	D	L	GF	GA	GD	Pts	Qualification
1	Fiji	3	3	0	0	9	1	+8	9	Knockout stage
2	Papua New Guinea	3	1	1	1	7	4	+3	4	Knockout stage
3	Tahiti	3	1	0	2	7	8	−1	3	5th place match
4	Cook Islands	3	0	1	2	1	11	−10	1	7th place match

Source: OFC
17 August 2025
12:00

Cook Islands	1–1	Papua New Guinea
Rua 47'	Report	Millis 76'

Lawson Tama Stadium, Honiara
Attendance: 787
Referee: Timothy Niu (Solomon Islands)
17 August 2025
15:00

Fiji	2–1	Tahiti
Chand 20'; Dau 70'	Report	Morgant 60' (pen.)

Lawson Tama Stadium, Honiara
Attendance: 1132
Referee: Calvin Berg (New Zealand)

20 August 2025
12:00

Papua New Guinea	6–1	Tahiti
Tehio 45+2' (o.g.); Yagum 46'; Enoch 50'; Tommy 67', 74' (pen.), 90'	Report	Vauquelin 10'

Lawson Tama Stadium, Honiara
Attendance: 148
Referee: Cory Mills (New Zealand)
20 August 2025
15:00

Fiji	5–0	Cook Islands
Muatini 4', 45+1'; Dau 36' (pen.); Archari 45+5', 70'	Report

Lawson Tama Stadium, Honiara
Attendance: 233
Referee: Jarethy George (Vanuatu)

23 August 2024
12:00

Tahiti	5–0	Cook Islands
Scheel 19' (o.g.); Aroa. Bennett 21', 26' (pen.); Vauquelin 41'; Aron. Bennett 71'	Report

Lawson Tama Stadium, Honiara
Attendance: 83
Referee: Peter Olomaga (Samoa)
23 August 2024
15:00

Papua New Guinea	0–2	Fiji
	Report	Dau 27', 83' (pen.)

Lawson Tama Stadium, Honiara
Attendance: 309
Referee: Calvin Berg (New Zealand)

=== Group B ===
Pos	Team	Pld	W	D	L	GF	GA	GD	Pts	Qualification
1	New Zealand	3	2	1	0	13	0	+13	7	Knockout stage
2	New Caledonia	3	2	1	0	10	2	+8	7	Knockout stage
3	Solomon Islands (H)	3	1	0	2	6	13	−7	3	5th place match
4	Samoa	3	0	0	3	0	14	−14	0	7th place match

Source: OFC
(H) Hosts
18 August 2025
12:00

New Zealand	5–0	Samoa
Baldoni 8', 45+2', 48'; Des Tombe 29'; Trenberth 68'	Report

National Stadium, Honiara
Attendance: 536
Referee: Arnold Tari (Vanuatu)
18 August 2025
15:00

New Caledonia	5–2	Solomon Islands
Wetewea 8'; Menango 53', 90+7'; Wede 59', 69'	Report	Sam 23' (pen.); Ben 37'

National Stadium, Honiara
Attendance: 1494
Referee: Veer Singh (Fiji)

21 August 2025
12:00

New Zealand	0–0	New Caledonia
	Report

National Stadium, Honiara
Attendance: 380
Referee: Kavitesh Behari (Fiji)
21 August 2025
15:00

Solomon Islands	4–0	Samoa
Sam 57' (pen.), 80'; Daomae 63', 75'	Report

National Stadium, Honiara
Attendance: 1009
Referee: Tellos Kaufusi (Tonga)

24 August 2025
12:00

Samoa	0–5	New Caledonia
	Report	Hmaloko 30', 61'; Boere 41'; Wede 45+3'; Wanabo 45+3' (pen.)

National Stadium, Honiara
Attendance: 900
Referee: Arnold Tari (Vanuatu)
24 August 2025
15:00

Solomon Islands	0–8	New Zealand
	Report	Woldegiorgis 25', 43', 73'; Dyer 37'; Nuñez 41' (pen.); Pietersen 44'; Baldoni 52'; Des Tombe 83'

National Stadium, Honiara
Attendance: 2368
Referee: Kavitesh Behari (Fiji)

== 7th place match ==
28 August 2025
11:30

Cook Islands	0–0	Samoa
	Report
Penalties
Paku (penalty scored); Pedersen (penalty scored); Angene (penalty scored); Webb (penalty missed)	3–5	(penalty scored) Williams; (penalty scored) Kapisi; (penalty scored) Wilson; (penalty scored) Edward; (penalty scored) Blood

Lawson Tama Stadium, Honiara
Attendance: 86
Referee: Timothy Niu (Fiji)

== 5th place match ==
28 August 2025
15:00

Tahiti	3–2	Solomon Islands
Vauquelin 16', 40'; Pita-Bourgues 45+4'	Report	Sam 12'; Ufaria 75'

Lawson Tama Stadium, Honiara
Attendance: 228
Referee: Cory Mills (New Zealand)

== Knockout stage ==
=== Bracket ===
Semi-finals
27 August – Honiara
Fiji	1 (4)
New Caledonia	1 (5)
27 August – Honiara
New Zealand	2
Papua New Guinea	0

Final
30 August – Honiara
New Caledonia	0
New Zealand	2
Third place match
30 August – Honiara
Fiji	1
Papua New Guinea	0

=== Semi-finals ===
Winners qualified for the 2026 FIFA U-17 World Cup.

27 August 2025
13:30

Fiji	1–1	New Caledonia
Dau 57' (pen.)	Report	Wede 70'
Penalties
Dau (penalty scored); Shah (penalty scored); Gounder (penalty scored); Chand (penalty missed); Vata (penalty scored); Baselala (penalty missed)	4–5	(penalty scored) Nyikeine; (penalty scored) Andrew; (penalty missed) Dupuis; (penalty scored) Huna; (penalty scored) Hmaloko; (penalty scored) Dreuko

National Stadium, Honiara
Attendance: 273
Referee: Calvin Berg (New Zealand)
27 August 2025
17:00

New Zealand	2–0	Papua New Guinea
Nuñez 62'; Baldoni 71' (pen.)	Report

National Stadium, Honiara
Attendance: 438
Referee: Veer Singh (Fiji)

=== Third place match ===
Winner qualified for the 2026 FIFA U-17 World Cup.

30 August 2025
13:30

Fiji	1–0	Papua New Guinea
Achari 20'	Report

National Stadium, Honiara
Attendance: 500
Referee: Calvin Berg (New Zealand)

=== Final ===
30 August 2025
17:00

New Caledonia	0–2	New Zealand
	Report	Clegg 44'; Baldoni 90+5'

National Stadium, Honiara
Attendance: 1050
Referee: Kavitesh Behari (Fiji)

== Broadcasting ==
All games will be streamed live and free on FIFA+.

== Awards ==
The following awards were given at the conclusion of the tournament.

Award	Player
Golden Ball	(New Zealand) Ethan Dyer
Golden Boot	(New Zealand) Ben Perez Baldoni
Golden Gloves	(New Caledonia) Sylvain Ipeze
Fair Play	Samoa and Tahiti

== Goalscorers ==
There were 65 goals scored in 18 matches, for an average of 3.61 goals per match.

6 goals

- (New Zealand) Ben Perez Baldoni

5 goals

- (Fiji) Maikah Dau

4 goals

- (New Caledonia) Lenddy Wede
- (Solomon Islands) Junior Sam
- (French Polynesia) Tiaitau Vauquelin

3 goals

- (Fiji) Ryan Achari
- (New Zealand) John Woldegiorgis
- (Papua New Guinea) Boas Tommy

2 goals

- (Fiji) Saula Muatini
- (New Caledonia) Darryl Hmaloko
- (New Caledonia) Andre Menango
- (New Zealand) Willem Des Tombe
- (New Zealand) Matías Nuñez
- (Solomon Islands) Charles Daomae
- (French Polynesia) Aroarii Bennett

1 goal

- (Cook Islands) Joseph Rua
- (Fiji) Arnav Chand
- (New Caledonia) Alexandre Boere
- (New Caledonia) Hnoija Wetewea
- (New Zealand) Jack Clegg
- (New Zealand) Ethan Dyer
- (New Zealand) Cruz Pietersen
- (New Zealand) Ben Trenberth
- (Papua New Guinea) Leightan Enoch
- (Papua New Guinea) John Millis
- (Papua New Guinea) Peter Yagum
- (Solomon Islands) Junior Ben
- (Solomon Islands) Ajay Ufaria
- (French Polynesia) Aronui Bennett
- (French Polynesia) Kahi Morgant
- (French Polynesia) Thomas Pita-Bourgues

== Qualified teams for FIFA U-17 World Cup ==
The following three teams from OFC qualified for the 2026 FIFA U-17 World Cup in Qatar.

Team	Qualified on	Previous appearances in FIFA U-17 World Cup^{1}
New Zealand	27 August 2025	11 (1997, 1999, 2007, 2009, 2011, 2013, 2015, 2017, 2019, 2023, 2025)
New Caledonia	27 August 2025	3 (2017, 2023, 2025)
Fiji	30 August 2025	1 (2025)

^{1} Bold indicates champions for that year. Italic indicates hosts for that year.
