= Nicolas King =

Vanuatuan footballer (born 2004)

Personal information
- Full name: Nicolas Francis King
- Date of birth: 14 April 2004 (age 22)
- Place of birth: Port Vila, Vanuatu
- Height: 1.90 m (6 ft 3 in)
- Position: Defender

Team information
- Current team: Vanuatu United

Youth career
- Mauriki

Senior career*
Years	Team	Apps	(Gls)
2020–2023	Mauriki		
2024–2025	Valentine FC	22	(3)
2025	Mauriki		
2026–	Vanuatu United	4	(1)

International career^{‡}
2022	Vanuatu U19	1	(0)
2023–	Vanuatu U23	4	(2)
2024–	Vanuatu	7	(1)
Medal record
Men's football
Representing Vanuatu
MSG Prime Minister's Cup
Winner	2025 Papua New Guinea
- * Club domestic league appearances and goals as of 16:07, 3 July 2026 (UTC) ‡ National team caps and goals as of 21:34, 6 February 2026 (UTC)

Nicolas Francis King (born 14 April 2004) is a Vanuatuan footballer who plays as a defender for OFC Professional League club Vanuatu United and the Vanuatu national team.

== Early life ==
King was born on 14 April 2004 in Port Vila to Francis and Gloria Julia King. His father is a businessman and former Member of Parliament for the Efate Rural constituency in Vanuatu. His mother is also a Member of Parliament and was a former international footballer and manager for Vanuatu. King attended Central School in Port Vila and played football for Mauriki, becoming youth team captain in 2018 and eventually breaking into their first team at the age of 16. He was offered a two-week trial by A-League Men club Central Coast Mariners in Gosford, Australia through Brian Kaltak's agent in December 2023.

== Club career ==
Following his trial with Central Coast Mariners, King was announced in January 2024 to have joined Valentine FC in the National Premier Leagues Northern NSW. He scored on his debut for the club and played all twenty-two matches in the 2024 season.

After one year King rejoined Mauriki, and then in November 2025, he joined OFC Professional League club Vanuatu United ahead of the inaugural 2026 season.

== International career ==
King represented the Vanuatu under-19 in the OFC U-19 Championship and Vanuatu under-23 squads. He was named captain for the under-23s ahead of the 2023 OFC Olympic Qualifying Tournament.

During the 2024 MSG Prime Minister's Cup, King made his debut for the Vanuatu senior team against Solomon Islands on 9 December 2024. He scored his first goal for Vanuatu as they lost the match 4–1. He was then included in the squad and played against Papua New Guinea Gold in the 2025 MSG Prime Minister's Cup final on 23 November 2025 which was won by Vanuatu.

== Career statistics ==
=== International ===
As of match played 11 December 2025.

Appearances and goals by national team and year
National team	Year	Apps	Goals
Vanuatu	2024	4	1
Vanuatu	2025	3	0
Total		7	1

Scores and results list Vanuatu's goal tally first, score column indicates score after each King goal.

List of international goals scored by Nicolas King
No.	Date	Venue	Cap	Opponent	Score	Result	Competition	Ref.
1.	10 December 2024	Lawson Tama Stadium, Honiara, Solomon Islands	1	Solomon Islands	1–3	1–4	2024 MSG Prime Minister's Cup	

== Honours ==
Vanuatu

- MSG Prime Minister's Cup: 2025
