= 2025 MSG Prime Minister's Cup – Women's tournament =

Inaugural edition of the MSG Women's Prime Minister's Cup

MSG Women's Prime Minister's Cup 2025
Tournament details
- Host country: Papua New Guinea
- Dates: 11–23 November
- Teams: 5
- Venues: 2 (in 1 host city)

Final positions
- Champions: Papua New Guinea (1st title)
- Runners-up: Fiji
- Third place: Vanuatu

Tournament statistics
- Matches played: 8
- Goals scored: 30 (3.75 per match)
- Top scorer: (Papua New Guinea) Ramona Padio (4 goals)

The 2025 MSG Prime Minister's Cup was held from 11–23 November. Papua New Guinea hosted the competition and were the defending champions from 2024. For the first time, both men's and women's tournament will be held.

The Host Organising committee has confirmed that no MSG Prime Minister's Cup games will be played at the Sir Ignatius Kilage Stadium in Lae, after the venue failed to meet FIFA standards.

New Caledonia has withdrawn from the Prime Minister's Cup, opting to focus on the upcoming FIFA Qualifiers instead. This strategic decision aims to conserve energy and minimize the risk of injuries. Interestingly, it seems that other island nations are now setting their sights on beating New Zealand.

== History ==
Papua New Guinea offered to host the 2025 edition of the Prime Minster's Cup at the Melanesian Spearhead Group (MSG) Sport Committee Meeting in September 2022 to coincide with the 50th anniversary of the country's independence. Papua New Guinea confirmed its desire to host at the committee's meeting in December 2024. The official host agreement was signed by the nation and MSG on 10 April 2025. The dates for the tournament were set as 4–18 October by summer 2025. The MSG Secretariat’s Programme Manager for Sports, Bill Henry, stated at that time that the group was looking to expand the teams in the competition and that it could feature teams from other confederations, notably the Confederation of African Football (CAF).

== Group Stage ==
=== Group A ===
Pos	Team	Pld	W	D	L	GF	GA	GD	Pts	Qualification
1	Papua New Guinea Gold (H)	1	1	0	0	4	0	+4	3	Semifinals
2	Vanuatu	1	0	0	1	0	4	−4	0	Semifinals

(H) Hosts
13 November 2025
16:00

Papua New Guinea Gold	4–0	Vanuatu
Padio 4'; Gere 6' (o.g.); Butubu 17'; Pala 65'

PNG Football Stadium, Port Moresby

=== Group B ===
Pos	Team	Pld	W	D	L	GF	GA	GD	Pts	Qualification
1	Fiji	2	2	0	0	4	2	+2	6	Semifinals
2	Solomon Islands	2	1	0	1	3	2	+1	3	Semifinals
3	Papua New Guinea Red (H)	2	0	0	2	1	4	−3	0	

(H) Hosts
11 November 2025
13:00

Papua New Guinea Red	1–2	Fiji
Wambi 45+2'		Tabunase 54'; Naweni 58'

Sir John Guise Stadium, Port Moresby
15 November 2025
13:00

Papua New Guinea Red	0–2	Solomon Islands
		Solosaia 55'; Gogoni 72'

Sir John Guise Stadium, Port Moresby
17 November 2025
13:00

Solomon Islands	1–2	Fiji
Arukau 89'		Bakaniceva 5'; Nasau 51'

PNG Football Stadium, Port Moresby

== Knockout Stage ==
=== Bracket ===
Semi-finals
November 20 – Port Moresby
Papua New Guinea Gold	5
Solomon Islands	0
November 20 – Port Moresby
Fiji	3
Vanuatu	1

Final
November 23 – Port Moresby
Papua New Guinea Gold	3
Fiji	0
Third place play-off
November 23 - Port Moresby
Solomon Islands	2
Vanuatu	4

=== Semi-finals ===
19 November 2025
10:00

Papua New Guinea Gold	5–0	Solomon Islands
Waida 19'; Padio 40', 52'; Elipas 69'; Kalapai 83'

Sir John Guise Stadium, Port Moresby
19 November 2025
13:00

Fiji	3–1	Vanuatu
Naweni 47'; Leba 69'; Nasau 90+1'		Simon 72'

Sir John Guise Stadium, Port Moresby

=== Third place playoff ===
23 November 2025
TBC

Solomon Islands	2–4	Vanuatu
Rotoava 15'; Gogoni 32'		Kaltack 24'; Simon 54', 66'; Poida 71'

PNG Football Stadium, Port Moresby

=== Final ===
23 November 2025
12:00

Papua New Guinea Gold	3–0	Fiji
Kaipu 45+2' (pen.); Padio 49'; Butubu 66'

Sir John Guise Stadium, Port Moresby
