= Maikah Dau =

Fijian footballer

Personal information
- Full name: Maikah Lomax Dau
- Date of birth: 29 April 2009 (age 17)
- Place of birth: Fiji
- Height: 1.67 m (5 ft 6 in)
- Position: Midfielder

Team information
- Current team: Nasinu
- Number: 11

Youth career
- –2024: Nasinu

Senior career*
Years	Team	Apps	(Gls)
2024–2026	Nasinu	23	(1)
2026	Bula	13	(0)
2026–	Nasinu	4	(0)

International career^{‡}
2025	Fiji U16	5	(5)
2025–	Fiji U17	3	(0)
2026–	Fiji U19	3	(0)
2026–	Fiji	4	(2)
Medal record
Men's football
Representing Fiji
MSG Prime Minister's Cup
Winner	2026 Fiji
- * Club domestic league appearances and goals as of 20 August 2026 ‡ National team caps and goals as of 30 September 2026

Maikah Lomax Dau (born 31 April 2009) is a Fijian professional footballer who plays as a midfielder for Fiji Premier League club Nasinu F.C. and the Fiji national football team. He has previously played for OFC Professional League side Bula FC.

== Early and personal life ==
Dau was born and raised in Fiji, and is the son of former Rewa and Fiji national team defender Lorima Dau, as well as the maternal grandson of another former Fiji international, ex-Savusavu striker Sarwan Singh.

Dau attends Rishikul Sanatan College in the town of Nasinu.

== Club career ==
=== Nasinu ===
Dau began his career at Fiji Premier League side Nasinu, playing for the club's U19 side at 13 years old, before making his senior debut just shy of his 15th birthday in 2024. In total, Dau made 24 appearances for the club, scoring 1 goal, as his performances at such a young age were widely praised.

=== Bula FC ===
Dau signed with the newly created Bula FC for the inaugural season of the OFC Professional League, becoming the youngest player in the competition when he started for Bula against Vanuatu United in January 2026. Following Dau's record-setting appearance, Bula captain and all-time Fiji top scorer Roy Krishna praised Dau, stating "He is gifted and a very special and unique talent, I feel priveliged to play alongside a player so young and determined like him." Dau made 13 appearances in the season as Bula made the leaders play-off group.

Upon the conclusion of the 2026 OFC Professional League season, Dau returned to his former club Nasinu for the remainder of the 2026 Fiji Premier League.

== International career ==
Dau has represented Fiji at multiple levels.

He captained Fiji at the 2025 OFC U-16 Men's Championship, scoring five goals in five matches, including a free-kick against Tahiti, and a brace against Papua New Guinea, before being eliminated in the semi-final on penalties. Fiji won the third-place play-off to qualify for the 2026 FIFA U-17 World Cup.

Dau captained Fiji U17 at the 2025 FIFA U-17 World Cup, as the team was eliminated in the group stage.

In May 2026, Dau was named in a 21-man provisional squad for the Fiji senior team's friendlies against Vanuatu.

He scored his first Fiji senior goal in a 3-3 draw against Solomon Islands in the MSG Prime Minister's Cup in September 2026.

== Career statistics ==
As of match played 16 August 2026

Appearances and goals by club, season and competition
Club	Season	League			National cup		Continental		Other		Total	
Club	Season	Division	Apps	Goals	Apps	Goals	Apps	Goals	Apps	Goals	Apps	Goals
Nasinu	2024	Fiji Premier League	12	0	—		—		—		12	0
Nasinu	2025	Fiji Premier League	11	1	—		—		—		11	1
Nasinu	Total		23	1	0	0	0	0	0	0	23	1
Bula	2026	OFC Professional League	13	0	0	0	0	0	0	0	13	0
Nasinu	2026	Fiji Premier League	4	0	0	0	0	0	0	0	4	0
Career total			40	1	0	0	0	0	0	0	40	1

=== International ===
As of match played 30 September 2026.

Team	Year	Apps	Goals
Fiji	2026	4	2

Scores and results list the Fiji's goal tally first.

List of international goals scored by Maikah Dau
No.	Date	Venue	Cap	Opponent	Score	Result	Competition
1	18 September 2026	HFC Bank Stadium, Suva, Fiji	3	Solomon Islands	2–1	3–3	2026 MSG Prime Minister's Cup
2	30 September 2026	HFC Bank Stadium, Suva, Fiji	4	New Caledonia	2–1	2–1	2026 MSG Prime Minister's Cup

== Honours ==
Fiji

- MSG Prime Minister's Cup : 2026
