= 2011 Wantok Cup =

2011 (first) Wantok Cup
Tournament details
- Host country: Solomon Islands
- Dates: 7–9 July
- Teams: 2 (from 2 countries)
- Venue(s): Honiara

Final positions
- Champions: Solomon Islands (2nd title)
- Runners-up: Vanuatu

Tournament statistics
- Matches played: 2
- Goals scored: 3 (1.5 per match)
- Top scorer(s): Joe Luwi, Benjamin Totori and Daniel Michel

2011 (second) Wantok Cup
Tournament details
- Host country: Vanuatu
- Dates: 27–30 July
- Teams: 2 (from 2 countries)
- Venue(s): Port Vila

Final positions
- Champions: Vanuatu (1st title)
- Runners-up: Solomon Islands

Tournament statistics
- Matches played: 2
- Goals scored: 2 (1 per match)
- Top scorer(s): Yvong August & Kensi Tangis

In July 2011, the men's national football teams of Solomon Islands and Vanuatu met for four games, with two hosted by each country. The first two were held in the Solomons on and around its Independence Day (7 July). They were followed by two in Vanuatu on and around that country's Independence Day (30 July). Thus the competition(s) conformed to the spirit of the seemingly defunct Wantok Cup, although it is not certain whether that name was formally used for this event.

Vanuatu won 3–2 on aggregate over the span of the four games, though they should probably be considered two separate competitions (as the Wantok Cup was initially intended), in which case each country won its own Independence Day event.

== 1st: Solomon Islands Independence Day ==
=== Schedule and results ===
7 July 2011

Solomon Islands	2–1	Vanuatu
Joe Luwi (60'), Benjamin Totori (63')		Daniel Michel (89')

Honiara

9 July 2011

Solomon Islands	0–0	Vanuatu

Honiara

=== Table ===
Team	Pld	W	D	L	GF	GA	GD	Pts
Solomon Islands	2	1	1	0	2	1	+1	4
Vanuatu	2	0	1	1	1	2	−1	1

== 2nd: Vanuatu Independence Day ==
=== Schedule and results ===
27 July 2011

Vanuatu	0–0	Solomon Islands

Port Vila

30 July 2011

Vanuatu	2–0	Solomon Islands
Yvong August (53'), Kensi Tangis (76')

Port Vila

=== Table ===
Team	Pld	W	D	L	GF	GA	GD	Pts
Vanuatu	2	1	1	0	2	0	+2	4
Solomon Islands	2	0	1	1	0	2	−2	1

== Notes and references ==
Preceded by 2008 Wantok Cup	Wantok Cup; Honiara & Port Vila; 2011	Succeeded by none to date
