= 2025 MSG Prime Minister's Cup – Men's tournament =

2025 MSG Prime Minister's Cup

Tournament details
- Host country: Papua New Guinea
- City: Port Moresby
- Dates: 11–23 November
- Teams: 4 + 1 (from 1 confederation)
- Venues: 2 (in 1 host city)

Final positions
- Champions: Vanuatu (1st title)
- Runners-up: Papua New Guinea

Tournament statistics
- Matches played: 8
- Goals scored: 17 (2.13 per match)
- Top scorer(s): (Papua New Guinea) Raymond Gunemba (Papua New Guinea) Pala Paul (Vanuatu) Alex Saniel (2 Goals)

The 2025 MSG Prime Minister's Cup men's tournament was held from 11–23 November. Papua New Guinea hosted the competition and were the defending champions from 2024, but lost in the final against Vanuatu. For the first time, a women's tournament was held in addition to the men's tournament.

The Host Organising committee confirmed that no MSG Prime Minister's Cup games would be played at the Sir Ignatius Kilage Stadium in Lae, after the venue failed to meet FIFA standards.

New Caledonia withdrew from the competition before the first match. Papua New Guinea was represented by both its senior national team, "PNG Gold", and a development team, "PNG Red".

== History ==
Papua New Guinea offered to host the 2025 edition of the Prime Minister's Cup at the Melanesian Spearhead Group (MSG) Sport Committee Meeting in September 2022 to coincide with the 50th anniversary of the country's independence. Papua New Guinea confirmed its desire to host at the committee's meeting in December 2024. The official host agreement was signed by the nation and MSG on 10 April 2025. The dates for the tournament were set as 4–18 October by summer 2025. The MSG Secretariat’s Programme Manager for Sports, Bill Henry, stated at that time that the group was looking to expand the teams in the competition and that it could feature teams from other confederations, notably the Confederation of African Football (CAF).

== Squad ==
2025 MSG Prime Minister's Cup – Men's team squads

== Group Stage ==
All times given as local time (UTC+10)

=== Group A ===
Pos	Team	Pld	W	D	L	GF	GA	GD	Pts	Qualification
1	Papua New Guinea Gold (H)	1	1	0	0	1	0	+1	3	Semifinals
2	Solomon Islands	1	0	0	1	0	1	−1	0	Semifinals

(H) Hosts
13 November 2025
16:00

Papua New Guinea Gold	1–0	Solomon Islands
Paul 75'	Report

PNG Football Stadium, Port Moresby

=== Group B ===
Pos	Team	Pld	W	D	L	GF	GA	GD	Pts	Qualification
1	Vanuatu	2	1	1	0	3	1	+2	4	Semifinals
2	Fiji	2	1	0	1	1	2	−1	3	Semifinals
3	Papua New Guinea Red (H)	2	0	1	1	1	2	−1	1	

(H) Hosts
11 November 2025
16:00

Papua New Guinea Red	1–1	Vanuatu
Moses 73'	Report	Saniel 6'

Sir John Guise Stadium, Port Moresby
15 November 2025
16:00

Papua New Guinea Red	0–1	Fiji
	Report	Vasconcellos 8'

Sir John Guise Stadium, Port Moresby
17 November 2025
16:00

Vanuatu	2–0	Fiji
K. Kaltack 50'; Iawak 62' (pen.)	Report

PNG Football Stadium, Port Moresby

== Knockout Stage ==
=== Bracket ===
Semi-finals
20 November – Port Moresby
Papua New Guinea Gold	2
Fiji	0
20 November – Port Moresby
Vanuatu	2
Solomon Islands	1

Final
23 November – Port Moresby
Papua New Guinea Gold	2 (4)
Vanuatu (p)	2 (5)
Third place play-off
22 November - Port Moresby
Fiji	1
Solomon Islands	1

=== Semi-finals ===
20 November 2025
16:00

Papua New Guinea Gold	2–0	Fiji
Gunemba 57', 64'	Report

PNG Football Stadium, Port Moresby
20 November 2025
19:00

Vanuatu	2–1	Solomon Islands
Andrew 32'; Loloa 40'	Report	Supa 44'

PNG Football Stadium, Port Moresby

=== Third place playoff ===
22 November 2025
17:00

Fiji	Abandoned (1–1)	Solomon Islands
Wasasala 22' (pen.)	Report	Boyers 35' (pen.)

PNG Football Stadium, Port Moresby

=== Final ===
23 November 2025
15:00

Papua New Guinea Gold	2–2	Vanuatu
Kepo 56'; Paul 101'	Report	A. Saniel 20'; L. Tioni 94'
Penalties
	4–5

Sir John Guise Stadium, Port Moresby
