= Scott Wara =

Fijian footballer (born 1999)

Personal information
- Full name: Semi Scott Wara
- Date of birth: 22 September 1999 (age 27)
- Place of birth: Lautoka, Fiji
- Height: 6 ft 1 in (1.85 m)
- Position: Defender

Team information
- Current team: Maitland FC
- Number: 31

Youth career
- Stoke City

Senior career*
Years	Team	Apps	(Gls)
2017–2020	Stoke City	0	(0)
2017–2018	→ Leek Town (loan)	2	(0)
2021–2023	Leek Town	59	(3)
2023	Finn Harps	7	(0)
2023–2024	Stalybridge Celtic	15	(1)
2024	Prescot Cables	6	(1)
2024–2025	Stafford Rangers	22	(5)
2026	Bula FC		
2026–	Maitland FC	10	(2)

International career^{‡}
2019	Fiji U23		
2018–	Fiji	13	(1)
Medal record
Men's football
Representing Fiji
MSG Prime Minister's Cup
Winner	2026 Fiji
- * Club domestic league appearances and goals as of 13 September 2026 ‡ National team caps and goals as of 30 September 2026

Semi Scott Wara (born 22 September 1999) is a Fijian footballer who plays as a defender for Maitland FC in the National Premier Leagues Northern NSW competition. He has represented the Fiji national team.

== Early and personal life ==
Wara was born in Lautoka, Fiji and moved to Staffordshire, England at a young age. His father served with the British Army. His brother Billy is a rugby player; Scott also played rugby at school before switching to football.

== Club career ==
Wara began his career with Stoke City, playing for the U21 team in the EFL Trophy. He moved on a one-month loan to Leek Town in December 2017, making two league appearances. Wara was released by Stoke City in July 2020.

Wara went on trial with Premier League club Newcastle United in November 2020, having previously been on trial at National League club Wrexham. He subsequently returned to Leek Town on a permanent basis in 2021, first appearing as an unused substitute against Trafford on 17 August, before making his debut in the FA Cup win against Gresley Rovers four days later.

On 22 June 2023, Wara was confirmed as a new signing by League of Ireland club Finn Harps on an 18-month contract.

On 8 September 2023, Stalybridge Celtic announced that they had signed Wara from Finn Harps.

In August 2024, Wara joined Northern Premier League Premier Division side Prescot Cables. He departed the club the following month due to travel and logistical issues.

On 3 October 2024, Wara joined Stafford Rangers.

On 16 December 2025, Wara returned to Fiji to sign for Bula FC in the newly formed OFC Professional League. Wara scored his first goal for the club in a 3–2 win over South Island United, an overhead bicycle kick in the 11th minute of stoppage time to secure the win for Bula.

Later in 2026 he played for Australian club Maitland FC.

== International career ==
Wara is eligible to represent either Fiji or England at international level. He received his first call-up to the Fiji senior national team in March 2018. He made his debut on 5 September 2018, in a 1–1 draw against the Solomon Islands, appearing as a half-time substitute for Narendra Rao. In September 2019 he joined the Fiji under-23 team.

== Personal life ==
He appeared on the 2023 BBC documentary Boot Dreams: Now or Never, about young footballers trying to gain a professional contract.

== Career statistics ==
=== Club ===
As of end of 2023–24 season

Appearances and goals by club, season and competition
Club	Season	League			National Cup		League Cup		Other		Total	
Club	Season	Division	Apps	Goals	Apps	Goals	Apps	Goals	Apps	Goals	Apps	Goals
Stoke City U23	2017–18	—	—		—		—		3 (Note: Appearances in EFL Trophy)	0	3	0
Stoke City U23	2018–19	—	—		—		—		3	0	3	0
Stoke City U23	Total		—		—		—		6	0	6	0
Stoke City	2018–19	EFL Championship	0	0	0	0	0	0	—		0	0
Leek Town (loan)	2017–18	NPL Division One South	2	0	0	0	0	0	—		2	0
Leek Town	2021–22	NPL Division One West	24	1	2	0	0	0	3 (Note: Two appearances in Staffordshire Senior Cup, one appearance in NPL West Play-offs)	0	29	1
Leek Town	2022–23	NPL Division One West	35	2	1	0	0	0	6 (Note: Two appearances in FA Trophy, three appearances in Staffordshire Senior Cup, one appearance in NPL West Play-offs)	0	42	2
Leek Town	Total		59	3	3	0	0	0	9	0	71	3
Finn Harps	2023	League of Ireland First Division	7	0	1	0	0	0	0	0	8	0
Stalybridge Celtic	2023–24	NPL Division One West	15	1	0	0	—		3 (Note: Two appearances in FA Trophy, one appearance in Manchester Premier Cup)	0	18	1
Career total			83	4	4	0	0	0	18	0	105	4

=== International ===
As of match played 19 June 2024

National team	Year	Apps	Goals
Fiji	2018	1	0
Fiji	2024	4	0
Total		5	0

As of match played 30 September 2026

Scores and results list the Fiji's goal tally first.

List of international goals scored by Scott Wara
No.	Date	Venue	Opponent	Score	Result	Competition
1	30 September 2026	HFC Bank Stadium, Suva, Fiji	New Caledonia	1–1	2–1	2026 MSG Prime Minister's Cup

== Honours ==
Fiji

- MSG Prime Minister's Cup: 2026
