= New Hebrides national football team results =

The New Hebrides national football team represented the New Hebrides in association football and was controlled by the New Hebrides Football Federation, the governing body of the sport in the territory. Before declaring independence as Vanuatu, the New Hebrides was not a member of the Fédération Internationale de Football Association (FIFA) or the Oceania Football Confederation (OFC). It played its first match in 1951 – a 9–0 friendly loss to New Zealand.

From a total of 37 matches, the New Hebrides won eight, drew three and lost 26, scoring 63 goals and conceding 108. The majority of its matches were played at neutral venues.

In 1963, the team played its first competitive match – a 6–3 loss to the Solomon Islands at the 1963 South Pacific Games. Three years later, it recorded its first win after defeating Papua New Guinea 5–2 at the 1966 South Pacific Games. At the 1979 South Pacific Games, the New Hebrides reached the quarter-finals before being eliminated by Tahiti. In the consolation tournament, they reached the fifth-place play-off where they were due to play Guam but the match was never played.

The New Hebrides contested the inaugural Oceania Cup in 1973. After defeating Fiji, the New Hebrides advanced to the third-place play-off where they lost to New Caledonia. They had less success at the 1980 Oceania Cup after losing all of their matches. In March 1980, the team played its last match as the New Hebrides – a 1–0 defeat to Tahiti.

On 30 July 1980, the New Hebrides declared independence from France and the United Kingdom as Vanuatu. Since then, the national football team has continued under the new name.

== Key ==
Key to matches

- Att.=Match attendance
- (H)=Home ground
- (A)=Away ground
- (N)=Neutral ground

Key to record by opponent

- Pld=Games played
- W=Games won
- D=Games drawn
- L=Games lost
- GF=Goals for
- GA=Goals against

== Results ==
The New Hebrides' score is shown first in each case.

No.	Date	Venue	Opponents	Score	Competition	New Hebrides scorers	Att.	Ref.
1	4 October 1951	Nouméa (N)	New Zealand	0–9	Friendly		—	
2	September 1953	New Hebrides (H)	Tahiti	2–4	Friendly	Unknown	—	
3	9 September 1957	French Polynesia (A)	Tahiti	1–2	Friendly	Unknown	—	
4	30 August 1963	Buckhurst Park, Suva (N)	Solomon Islands	3–6	1963 South Pacific Games	Gedeon, Tomoi, Kalbeo	—	
5	12 December 1966	Nouméa (N)	New Caledonia	0–5	1966 South Pacific Games		—	
6	13 December 1966	Nouméa (N)	Solomon Islands	4–4	1966 South Pacific Games	Unknown	—	
7	15 December 1966	Nouméa (N)	Tahiti	0–3	1966 South Pacific Games		—	
8	17 December 1966	Nouméa (N)	Papua New Guinea	5–2	1966 South Pacific Games	Unknown	—	
9	14 August 1969	Club Germania, Port Moresby (N)	Tahiti	3–3	1969 South Pacific Games	Maurice, Depuis, Own goal	—	
10	15 August 1969	Club Germania, Port Moresby (N)	Fiji	2–5	1969 South Pacific Games	Unknown	—	
11	16 August 1969	Club Germania, Port Moresby (N)	New Caledonia	0–2	1969 South Pacific Games		—	
12	18 August 1969	Club Germania, Port Moresby (N)	Papua New Guinea	1–2	1969 South Pacific Games	Unknown	—	
13	20 August 1969	Club Germania, Port Moresby (N)	Solomon Islands	2–7	1969 South Pacific Games	Unknown	—	
14	11 September 1971	Papeete (N)	Fiji	6–4	1971 South Pacific Games	Unknown	—	
15	13 September 1971	Papeete (N)	New Caledonia	0–0	1971 South Pacific Games		—	
16	16 September 1971	Papeete (N)	Tahiti	2–1	1971 South Pacific Games	Unknown	—	
17	18 September 1971	Papeete (N)	New Caledonia	1–7	1971 South Pacific Games	Unknown	16,000	
18	18 February 1973	Newmarket Park, Auckland (N)	New Caledonia	1–4	1973 Oceania Cup	Dupuy	—	
19	20 February 1973	Newmarket Park, Auckland (N)	Tahiti	0–1	1973 Oceania Cup		—	
20	21 February 1973	Newmarket Park, Auckland (N)	Fiji	2–1	1973 Oceania Cup	Saurei, J. Valette	—	
21	23 February 1973	Newmarket Park, Auckland (N)	New Zealand	1–3	1973 Oceania Cup	R. Valette	—	
22	24 February 1973	Newmarket Park, Auckland (N)	New Caledonia	1–2	1973 Oceania Cup	Galinie	—	
23	2 August 1975	Guam (N)	Papua New Guinea	3–0	1975 South Pacific Games	Unknown	—	
24	4 August 1975	Guam (N)	New Caledonia	1–3	1975 South Pacific Games	Unknown	—	
25	5 August 1975	Guam (N)	Tahiti	0–3	1975 South Pacific Games		—	
26	7 August 1978	New Hebrides (H)	Tahiti	2–4	Friendly	Unknown	—	
27	5 July 1979	Solomon Islands (A)	Solomon Islands	1–3	Friendly	Unknown	—	
28	6 July 1979	Solomon Islands (A)	Solomon Islands	0–3	Friendly		—	
29	29 August 1979	Buckhurst Park, Suva (N)	Guam	4–0	1979 South Pacific Games	Nafu (2), Naugar, Own goal	—	
30	31 August 1979	Buckhurst Park, Suva (N)	New Caledonia	0–3	1979 South Pacific Games		—	
31	3 September 1979	Buckhurst Park, Suva (N)	Tahiti	0–1	1979 South Pacific Games		—	
32	5 September 1979	Ratu Cakobau Park, Nausori (N)	Papua New Guinea	2–0	1979 South Pacific Games	Unknown	—	
33	6 September 1979	Ratu Cakobau Park, Nausori (N)	Tonga	7–1	1979 South Pacific Games	Unknown	—	
34	24 February 1980	Stade Numa-Daly Magenta, Nouméa (N)	Papua New Guinea	3–4	1980 Oceania Cup	Unknown	—	
35	26 February 1980	Stade Numa-Daly Magenta, Nouméa (N)	New Caledonia	3–4	1980 Oceania Cup	Unknown	—	
36	28 February 1980	Stade Numa-Daly Magenta, Nouméa (N)	Australia	0–1	1980 Oceania Cup		—	
37	March 1980	French Polynesia (A)	Tahiti	0–1	Friendly		—	

== Record by opponent ==
Team	Pld	W	D	L	GF	GA	GD	WPCT
Australia	1	0	0	1	0	1	−1	0.00
Fiji	3	2	0	1	10	10	0	66.67
Guam	1	1	0	0	4	0	+4	100.00
New Caledonia	9	0	1	8	7	30	−23	0.00
New Zealand	2	0	0	2	1	12	−11	0.00
Papua New Guinea	5	3	0	2	14	8	+6	60.00
Solomon Islands	5	0	1	4	10	23	−13	0.00
Tahiti	10	1	1	8	10	23	−13	10.00
Tonga	1	1	0	0	7	1	+6	100.00
Total	37	8	3	26	63	108	−45	21.62

Source: Results
