= 2025 OFC U-16 Men's Championship qualification =

Tournament details
- Host country: Tonga
- Teams: 4 (from 1 confederation)
- Venue: 1 (in 1 host city)

Final positions
- Champions: Papua New Guinea
- Runners-up: Tonga
- Third place: Vanuatu
- Fourth place: American Samoa

Tournament statistics
- Top scorer: (Papua New Guinea) Boas Tommy (7 goals)

The qualifying tournament for the 2025 OFC U-16 Men's Championship will be held from 3–9 May. All games are streamed live and free on FIFA+.

== Venue ==
Qualifying tournament venues being played in Tonga in one host city in Nuku'alofa.

Tonga
Nuku'alofa
Teufaiva Sport Stadium
Capacity: 10,000
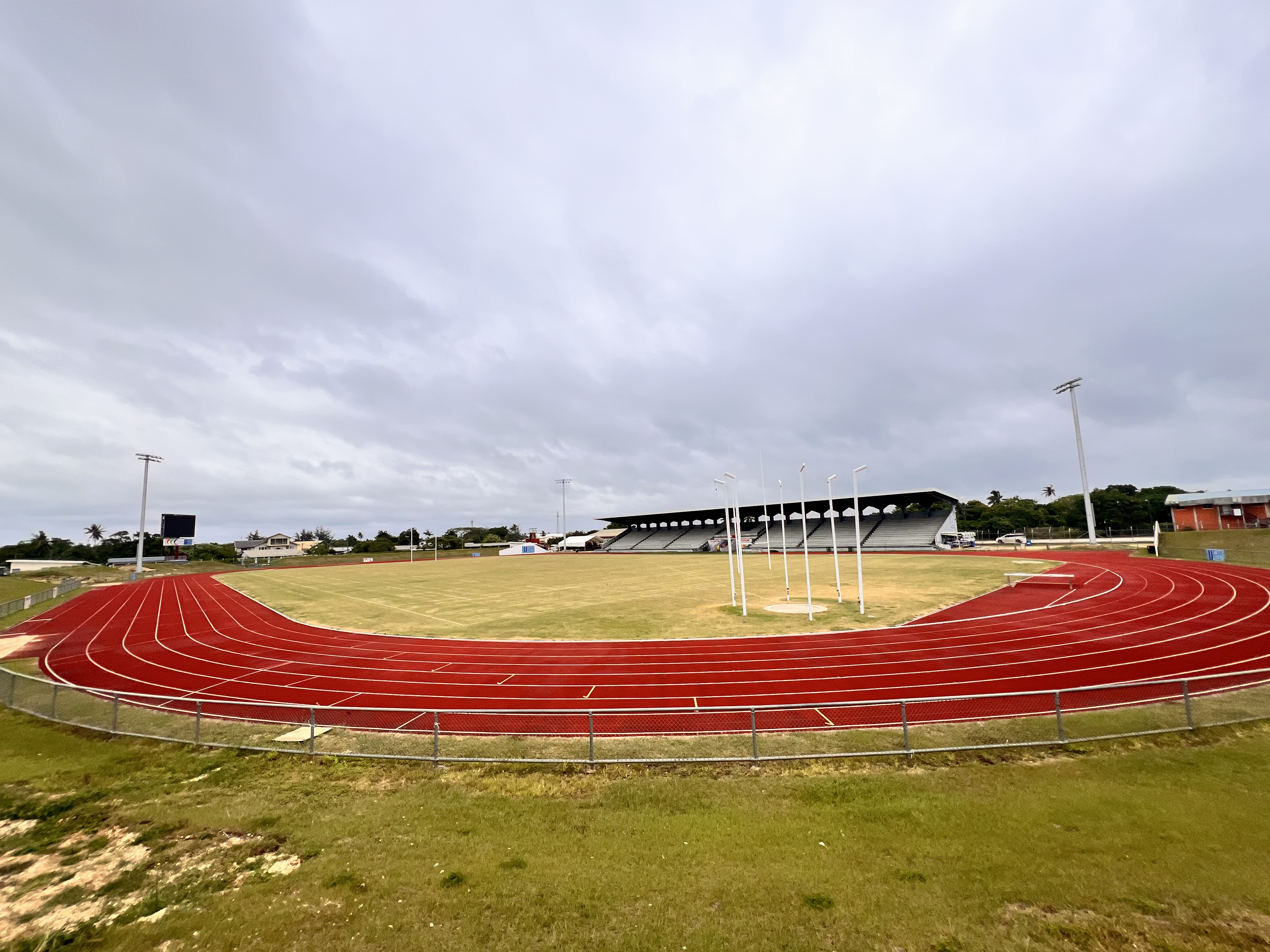

== Group stage ==
The draw for the tournament was held on 20 March 2025.

Pos	Team	Pld	W	D	L	GF	GA	GD	Pts	Qualification	(Papua New Guinea)	(Tonga)	(Vanuatu)	(American Samoa)
1	Papua New Guinea	3	2	1	0	12	2	+10	7	Qualify for Final tournament	—	5–2	—	—
2	Tonga (H)	3	1	1	1	9	8	+1	4		—	—	2–2	5–1
3	Vanuatu	3	0	3	0	4	4	0	3		0–0	—	—	—
4	American Samoa	3	0	1	2	3	14	−11	1		0–7	—	2–2	—

Source: OFC
(H) Hosts
3 May 2025
10:00

American Samoa	2–2	Vanuatu
Faleagafulu 8'; Vatoko 45+4' (o.g.)	Report	Tanga 90+2' (pen.); Albert 90+7'

Teufaiva Stadium, Nukuʻalofa
Attendance: 50
Referee: Gideon Mamuala (Solomon Islands)
3 May 2025
15:00

Papua New Guinea	5–2	Tonga
Rani 7'; Yagum 13', 42'; Tommy 30', 37' (pen.)	Report	Kautai 66'; Veatupu 90+3'

Teufaiva Stadium, Nukuʻalofa
Attendance: 300
Referee: Caleb Downes (New Zealand)

6 May 2025
10:00

American Samoa	0–7	Papua New Guinea
	Report	Tommy 29', 34', 49', 64', 66'; Yagum 39', 46'

Teufaiva Stadium, Nukuʻalofa
Attendance: 50
Referee: Neeshil Varman (Fiji)
6 May 2025
15:00

Tonga	2–2	Vanuatu
Veatupu 21'; Lonitenisi 30'	Report	Tawia 70'; Iarel 83'

Teufaiva Stadium, Nukuʻalofa
Attendance: 150
Referee: Sammy Duchamplecheval (France)

9 May 2025
10:00

Vanuatu	0–0	Papua New Guinea
	Report

Teufaiva Stadium, Nukuʻalofa
Attendance: 50
Referee: Neeshil Varman (Fiji)
9 May 2025
15:00

Tonga	5–1	American Samoa
Setefano 3'; Moala 63'; Kautai 70', 90'; Lonitenisi 76'	Report	Faleagafulu 33'

Teufaiva Stadium, Nukuʻalofa
Referee: Caleb Downes (New Zealand)
