= Ati Kepo =

Papua New Guinean footballer (born 1996)

Personal information
- Full name: Ati Kepo
- Date of birth: 15 January 1996 (age 30)
- Place of birth: Papua New Guinea
- Height: 1.82 m (6 ft 0 in)
- Position: Forward

Team information
- Current team: PNG Hekari
- Number: 9

Senior career*
| Years | Team | Apps | (Gls) |
| 2019– | Hekari United/PNG Hekari | | |

International career^{‡}
| 2019– | Papua New Guinea | 30 | (10) |
Medal record
Men's football
Representing Papua New Guinea
MSG Prime Minister's Cup
| Winner | 2022 Vanuatu |
| Winner | 2024 Solomon Islands |
| Runner-up | 2025 Papua New Guinea |
- * Club domestic league appearances and goals ‡ National team caps and goals as of 30 September 2026

Ati Kepo (born 15 January 1996) is a Papua New Guinean professional footballer who plays as a forward for PNG Hekari and the Papua New Guinea national team.

== Club career ==
Kepo is from the village of Kalo in the Rigo District. He represented his village's team at the Hekari Central Cup and was scouted, along with two of his brothers, to join Hekari United.

== International career ==
Kepo debuted internationally with the Papua New Guinea national team on 8 July 2019 in a friendly match against Samoa in a 6-0 victory in which he scored.

Kepo was again called up on 18 March 2022 in a 2022 FIFA World Cup qualifying match against New Zealand in a 1–0 defeat. It was his first cap after four years. On 24 March 2022, Kepo scored for Papua New Guinea against Fiji in a 2–1 victory, advancing his team to the final stage to face the Solomon Islands in which he scored another goal, resulting a 3–2 defeat.

== International goals ==
| No. | Date | Venue | Opponent | Score | Result | Competition |
|---|---|---|---|---|---|---|
| 1. | 8 July 2019 | J.S. Blatter Soccer Stadium, Apia, Samoa | Samoa | 6–0 | 6–0 | 2019 Pacific Games |
| 2. | 24 March 2022 | Grand Hamad Stadium, Doha, Qatar | Fiji | 1–1 | 2–1 | 2022 FIFA World Cup qualification |
| 3. | 27 March 2022 | Grand Hamad Stadium, Doha, Qatar | Solomon Islands | 2–3 | 2–3 | 2022 FIFA World Cup qualification |
| 4. | 24 September 2022 | Korman Stadium, Port Vila, Vanuatu | Vanuatu | 1–0 | 1–0 | 2022 MSG Prime Minister's Cup |
| 5. | 16 June 2023 | National Stadium, Kallang, Singapore | Singapore | 2–2 | 2–2 | Friendly |
| 6. | 23 November 2023 | Lawson Tama Stadium, Honiara, Solomon Islands | Vanuatu | 1–0 | 1–1 | 2023 Pacific Games |
| 7. | 22 June 2024 | HFC Bank Stadium, Suva, Fiji | Samoa | 2–0 | 2–1 | 2024 OFC Nations Cup |
| 8. | 14 November 2024 | PNG Football Stadium, Port Moresby, Papua New Guinea | Fiji | 2–1 | 3–3 | 2026 FIFA World Cup qualification |
| 9. | 24 September 2026 | HFC Bank Stadium, Suva, Fiji | New Caledonia | 1–1 | 1–2 | 2026 MSG Prime Minister's Cup |
| 10. | 30 September 2026 | HFC Bank Stadium, Suva, Fiji | Solomon Islands | 1–1 | 1–1 | 2026 MSG Prime Minister's Cup |

== Honours ==
Papua New Guinea

- MSG Prime Minister's Cup: 2022, 2024; runner-up, 2025
