= Terry O'Donnell (footballer) =

English footballer and manager

Personal information
- Place of birth: England

Senior career*
| Years | Team | Apps | (Gls) |
| | Liverpool Nalgo | 65 | (20) |
| | Newton FC | 20 | (6) |
| | Hamilton AFC | 320 | (173) |

Managerial career
- Hamilton AFC (playing coach)
- Shepherds United
- Nasinu F.C.
- Kiwi F.C.
- 1987–1993: Vanuatu national football team
- * Club domestic league appearances and goals

Terry O'Donnell is an English professional football player and manager.

== Career ==
At the beginning of his career, after a trial at Liverpool FC, he played for semi-pro football club Liverpool Nalgo and a couple of other teams including Oglan United in the Liverpool Sunday league. Then he decided to move to New Zealand on a football contract with his wife Barbara. The condition of his transfer to the football club in New Zealand was playing at a Newton FC in West Cheshire League. He played for them for about three quarters of a season and then the scout Ron Moore, on behalf of Hamilton AFC in Waikato, New Zealand, offered him a two-year contract. Terry O'Donnell stayed with Hamilton AFC for 12 years, won many league and cup championships, became the President of the club for six years. He retired from playing at the age of 37, when Barclay's Merchant Bank, where he was the Regional Manager in the Waikato, offered him a position heading up their international trust company in Vanuatu.

He became the National Coach of Vanuatu and coached club side Shepards United winning the league and cup double in his first season in Vanuatu. From 1987 until 1993 he coached the Vanuatu national football team. In 1990, he won the Melanesia Cup with Vanuatu. This was first and only international sporting triumph so far for the nation and what a celebration! He was awarded the Vanuatu Medal of Honour and also appeared with the team on a series of postage stamps. The Vanuatu team had many successes apart from being the South Pacific Champions, having great success in FIFA competitions and also knocking New Zealand out of the World Cup and being the last South Pacific Island Nation to beat Australia ( 1 v 0 in Port Vila). He received an offer to lead Nasinu F.C. participating in the Fiji league in Suva Fiji, Nasinu made the final of the IDC in the second season. The next club in his career was Kiwi F.C. in Samoa. For the next two seasons the club was undefeated, won the Premier League and Cup double twice and for the first time also he coached the women's Kiwi FC team, who also remained unbeaten winning the league and cup double and the national five-a-side competition.

In his career he won many league championships and medals:

Liverpool & District Sunday League Runner up 9th Division (my first medal) Northern League 4 Championship medals Northern Cup winners 2 winners medals Waikato 1st Division League Championship 8 winners medals Waikato Cup winner 10 medals (Scored in every cup final) Waikato 2nd Division Runner- up once (with Te Awamutu) Cambridge Annual Cup Tournament 8 winners medals Rotorua Annual Cup tournament 3 winners medals Auckland 5-a-side Tournament Champions two seasons – leading goal scorer

== Coaching ==
Hamilton AFC 68 games without defeat Shepards United Double winner: League and Cup Vanuatu National Team Winner - Melanesian Cup Vanuatu National Team 4th South Pacific Championship Vanuatu National Team Oceania Footsal Runners-up Vanuatu U19 Runners-up Oceania Nasino (Fiji) Promotion play-off winners / Runner up IDC Vietnam League Champions Samoa Kiwi FC – League & Cup Double 2 seasons Samoa Kiwi FC – League Championship Samoa Kiwi FC Ladies: League/Cup Double 3 seasons Samoa Kiwi FC Ladies – Footsal Champions
