= Wantok Cup =

- Founded: 2008
- Region: Western Melanesia
- Teams: 3
- Current champions: Solomon Islands
- Most championships: Solomon Islands (2 titles)

The Wantok Cup was an international football competition between the national teams of three Melanesian countries: Papua New Guinea, Solomon Islands and Vanuatu. The Cup was to be a thrice-a-year competition, to be held in July (twice) and September (once), as part of independence commemoration celebrations in the Solomons, Vanuatu and Papua New Guinea, respectively. The inaugural edition of the Cup was held during independence celebrations in the Solomon Islands, from July 3 to July 7, 2008, and was won by the hosts.

Eddie Ngava, General Secretary of the Solomon Islands Football Federation, had stated: "We hope this will be the inaugural start of the Wantok Cup when each of the three countries will be having a competition on each of their countries' independence days." The Cup has been described by the Oceania Football Confederation as "a tournament reminiscent of the now defunct Melanesian Cup". Ngava, however, has stated that "these two competitions are not linked in any way".

Wantok is a Tok Pisin and Pijin word which comes from the English "one talk", and means people who speak the same language, belong to the same culture, and are comrades. The name was chosen so as to emphasise the similarities of the pidgin languages spoken in the three countries - namely Tok Pisin, Pijin and Bislama.

== Difficulties ==
From the start, the competition was plagued by financial difficulties. Papua New Guinea's team withdrew from the inaugural edition at the last moment, citing financial constraints, and Vanuatu announced that it would be unable to host the second edition of the Cup, for the same reason. Nonetheless, the Wantok Cup was expected to continue, Vanuatu having pledged to host it in July 2009.

The 2009 games did not take place. The second edition of the Wantok Cup was then due to be hosted by Vanuatu to coincide with its Independence Day celebrations in July 2010. In March 2010, the Vanuatu Daily Post commented that the Solomon Islands Football Federation was preparing seriously for the Cup, while the Vanuatu Football Federation was yet to do so. On July 9, the Solomon Star reported that Papua New Guinea would not be attending, as it was "occupied by other football programs", and that even scheduled host Vanuatu had yet to confirm it would be taking part. The article concluded: "If Vanuatu agrees to host the tournament then it is likely that the Wantok Cup will only feature Solomon Islands and Vanuatu." There is no record of the July 2010 edition of the Cup having taken place - presumably due to a withdrawal by the hosts.

In 2011, Vanuatu and the Solomon Islands met for four games, beginning with a match in the Solomons on its Independence Day and culminating in a match held in Vanuatu on the latter's Independence Day, which had been the aim of the Wantok Cup, although the media did not use the Cup's name. Vanuatu won the final match 2-0, and the four matches on aggregate by 3-2. Nonetheless, if one considers the Solomons' Independence Day matches (July 7 & 9) separately from those held around Vanuatu's Independence Day (July 27 & 30), and treats them as separate competitions, then the Solomons won the former 2-1 on aggregate, and Vanuatu the latter 2-0 on aggregate.

No further editions of the Cup have been reported as scheduled; the Cup appears to be defunct as such, or to continue only in an informal manner.

Thus, Papua New Guinea never actually competed in a Wantok Cup event. New Caledonia never participated in the adult Wantok Cup either, but sent a national team to the inaugural (and so far only) edition of the Junior Wantok Cup in January 2010.

== Results ==
=== Wins ===
2	Solomon Islands	2008; 2011 (first)
1	Vanuatu	2011 (second)
0	Papua New Guinea	

=== Summaries ===
The second edition of the Cup, due to be hosted in Vanuatu in July 2008, was cancelled due to the host's financial difficulties. There is no record of the July 2010 edition having taken place. Matches played in 2011 do not appear to have been formally described as an edition of the Wantok Cup.

Year	Host	Winner	Runner-up	3rd Place	4th Place
2008 (1st); Details	Solomon Islands	Solomon Islands U23	Vanuatu	Solomon Islands	Papua New Guinea (withdrew)
2008 (2nd)	Vanuatu	event cancelled			
2008 (3rd)	Papua New Guinea	event cancelled			
2010	Vanuatu	event cancelled			
2011 (1st); Details (informal)	Solomon Islands	Solomon Islands	Vanuatu	none	none
2011 (2nd); Details (informal)	Vanuatu	Vanuatu	Solomon Islands	none	none

== Senior editions ==
=== July 2008 (first) ===
The inaugural edition of the Wantok Cup was held during Independence Day celebrations in Honiara, Solomon Islands, from July 3 to July 7, 2008. The host nation fielded two teams, and Vanuatu one. The Solomons' team of under-23 year-olds won the Cup. Though it was intended to be the first in a series of regular events, all subsequent editions of the adult Wantok Cup were cancelled.

=== July 2008 (second) ===
The second edition of the Wantok Cup was scheduled to be held during Independence Day celebrations in Vanuatu, in late July 2008. Papua New Guinea having withdrawn from the first edition of the Cup earlier in July, due to financial reasons, the country's participation in the second edition remained uncertain. The Solomon Islands was to be represented by two teams.

On July 18, it was announced that Vanuatu would be unable to host the Cup that month, due to financial difficulties. The second edition of the Wantok Cup was consequently cancelled. The Vanuatu Football Federation stated that the country would host the Cup in July 2009. In the end, no games were held in 2009.

=== September 2008 ===
The third edition of the Wantok Cup was scheduled to be held during Independence Day celebrations in Papua New Guinea, in September 2008. The Solomon Islands initially confirmed their participation, and were due to play against the hosts on September 20, but then pulled out, citing financial constraints. The September 2008 edition of the Wantok Cup was then expected to be an encounter between Papua New Guinea and Vanuatu.

This edition of the Cup never took place. The second edition of the Cup was rescheduled for July 2010, to be hosted by Vanuatu.

Papua New Guinea	cancelled	Vanuatu

=== July 2010 ===
The second edition of the Wantok Cup was due to be held in Vanuatu, and to begin on July 31, 2010. Had the Cup being held according to schedule, this would have been the seventh or eighth edition, as the Wantok Cup was supposed to be held thrice yearly. Following the inaugural edition in July 2008 in the Solomon Islands, scheduled editions for 2008 were cancelled, and no games were held in 2009.

The Solomon Islands national football team confirmed its participation. As of early July, it was the only country to have done so. The Oceania Football Confederation in February spoke of the Solomon Islands team facing Vanuatu in the Wantok Cup in July, thus suggesting that Papua New Guinea would be absent, or that its participation was unconfirmed. In March, the Vanuatu Daily Post commented that the Solomon Islands Football Federation was preparing seriously for the Cup, while the Vanuatu Football Federation was yet to do so. On July 9, the Solomon Star reported that Papua New Guinea would not be attending, as it was "occupied by other football programs", and that even scheduled host Vanuatu had yet to confirm it would be taking part. The article concluded: "If Vanuatu agrees to host the tournament then it is likely that the Wantok Cup will only feature Solomon Islands and Vanuatu."

There is no record of the July 2010 edition of the Cup having taken place - presumably due to a withdrawal by the hosts. No further editions of the Cup have been reported as scheduled.

July 31, 2010

Vanuatu	cancelled	Solomon Islands

=== July 2011 (1st & 2nd) ===
These may not have been official editions of the Cup. Nonetheless, Vanuatu and the Solomon Islands met for four games in July, beginning with two in the Solomons on and around its independence day (July 7), followed by two match in Vanuatu on and around that country's independence day, July 30 - as intended originally by the Wantok Cup. On aggregate, over the span of the four games, Vanuatu scored three goals to the Solomons' two. If the events are considered separately, Solomon Islands won its Independence Day games 2-1 on aggregate, while Vanuatu won its Independence Day games on aggregate 2-0.

== Junior edition ==
There has also been a Junior Wantok Cup, for under-15s. Originally scheduled to be launched in 2008, it was -like the adult version- delayed. The official inaugural edition was hosted by Vanuatu in January 2010, with five teams competing (three from the host country, one from the Solomon Islands and one from New Caledonia). The Solomon Islands defeated Vanuatu South 4-1 to take the title, replicating the achievement of their adult counterparts.

Wins

1	Solomon Islands	January 2010
0	Vanuatu	
0	New Caledonia	

== See also ==
- Papua New Guinea national football team
- Solomon Islands national football team
- Vanuatu national football team
