= 2008 Wantok Cup =

2008 (July, first) Wantok Cup
Tournament details
- Host country: Solomon Islands
- Dates: 3 – 7 July
- Teams: 4 (from 3 countries)
- Venue(s): Honiara

Final positions
- Champions: Solomon Islands (1st title)
- Runners-up: Vanuatu
- Third place: Solomon Islands

Tournament statistics
- Matches played: 3
- Goals scored: 12 (4 per match)

The inaugural edition of the Wantok Cup was held during Independence Day celebrations in Honiara, Solomon Islands, from 3 to 7 July 2008.

The hosts were represented by two teams, while Papua New Guinea and Vanuatu were initially scheduled to enter one team each. Papua New Guinea withdrew at the last moment, citing "financial problems".

The Solomon Islands U23 became the first Wantok Cup champions, on home ground.

The second Wantok Cup was scheduled to be held later the same month, during Independence Day celebrations in Vanuatu. The event was cancelled for financial reasons, and the second edition of the Wantok Cup was rescheduled to be held in Vanuatu in July 2010. There is no record of it having been held, making the inaugural edition the only competition to date.

== Schedule and results ==
3 July 2008

Solomon Islands	3–3	Solomon Islands U23
Godwin Bebeu (twice), Milton Bata Furai (own goal)	report	?, ?, Presley Futa

Honiara
Attendance: n/a
Referee: Lency Fred (Van)

3 July 2008

Vanuatu	cancelled (PNG withdrawal)	Papua New Guinea

Honiara
Attendance: n/a
Referee: n/a

5 July 2008

Vanuatu	1–2	Solomon Islands U23
Jean Robert Yelou	report	Ezra Sale (twice)

Honiara
Attendance: n/a
Referee: Leonie Rakoroi (Fiji)

5 July 2008

Solomon Islands	cancelled (PNG withdrawal)	Papua New Guinea

Honiara
Attendance: n/a
Referee: n/a

7 July 2008

Solomon Islands	1–2	Vanuatu
Lency Saeni	report	Jean Robert Yelou, Seimata Chilia

Honiara
Attendance: n/a
Referee: n/a

7 July 2008

Papua New Guinea	cancelled (PNG withdrawal)	Solomon Islands U23

Honiara
Attendance: n/a
Referee: n/a

=== Table ===
Team	Pld	W	D	L	GF	GA	GD	Pts
Solomon Islands U23	2	1	1	0	5	4	+1	4
Vanuatu	2	1	0	1	3	3	+0	3
Solomon Islands	2	0	1	1	4	5	-1	1
Papua New Guinea (withdrawn)	0	0	0	0	0	0	+0	0

== See also ==
- Wantok Cup
- July 2008 second Wantok Cup
- July 2010 Wantok Cup

== Notes and references ==
Preceded by none	Wantok Cup; Honiara; 2008	Succeeded by 2011 Wantok Cup
