= Saby Natonga =

Vanuatuan football manager

Personal information
- Place of birth: Vanuatu

Managerial career
- Years: Team
- 1996: Vanuatu
- 2011–2012: Vanuatu

Saby Natonga, is a Vanuatuan professional football manager and the current Vice President of the Vanuatu Football Federation. In 1996 and from July 2011 to May 2012 he was coach of the Vanuatu national football team.
