= Kasper Såby =

Danish footballer (born 1974)

Personal information
- Full name: Kasper Såby Jensen
- Date of birth: 4 February 1974 (age 52)
- Place of birth: Denmark
- Position: Forward

Senior career*
Years	Team	Apps	(Gls)
- Dragør
1995	Slovácko	6	(2)
- B 1908
- Vanløse
- * Club domestic league appearances and goals

Kasper Såby Jensen (born 4 February 1974) is a Danish former footballer who is known to have played as a forward for Dragør Boldklub, Fremad Amager, Vanløse and B1908

== Career ==
In 1995, Såby signed for Czech top flight side Slovácko from Dragør in the Danish third division after a trial where he scored 6 goals in 4 friendlies but left due to injury.
