= Chris Pedersen =

Chris Pedersen may refer to:

- Chris Pedersen (actor), American actor
- Chris Pedersen (musician), drummer
