= Vanuatu national football team =

National association football team representing Vanuatu

Vanuatu
- Nickname(s): The Men in Black and Gold
- Association: Vanuatu Football Federation (VFF)
- Confederation: OFC (Oceania)
- Head coach: Richard Iwai
- Captain: Brian Kaltak
- Most caps: Kensi Tangis (39)
- Top scorer: Richard Iwai (20)
- Home stadium: Port Vila Municipal Stadium
- FIFA code: VAN
First colours	Second colours

FIFA ranking
- Current: 161 ▼1 (7 October 2026)
- Highest: 131 (October 2007)
- Lowest: 201 (October–November 2015)

First international
- New Zealand 9–0 New Hebrides (Nouméa, New Caledonia; 4 October 1951)

Biggest win
- Kiribati 0–18 Vanuatu (Lautoka, Fiji; 7 July 2003)

Biggest defeat
- New Zealand 9–0 New Hebrides (Nouméa, New Caledonia; 4 October 1951)

OFC Nations Cup
- Appearances: 10 (first in 1973)
- Best result: Runners-up (2024)

Pacific Games
- Appearances: 15 (first in 1963)
- Best result: Runners-up (1971)

Melanesia Cup / MSG Prime Minister's Cup
- Appearances: 11 (first in 1988)
- Best result: Melanesia Cup: Champions (1990); MSG Prime Minister's Cup: Champions (2025)
Medal record
Men's football
OFC Nations Cup
Runner-up	2024 Fiji/Vanuatu
Pacific Games
Silver medal – second place	1971 Tahiti
Bronze medal – third place	1966 New Caledonia
Bronze medal – third place	2003 Fiji
Bronze medal – third place	2007 Samoa
Pacific Mini Games
Gold medal – first place	2017 Vanuatu
Melanesian Cup/MSG Prime Minister's Cup
Winner	1990 New Caledonia
Winner	2025 Papa Nuew Guinea
Runner-up	1998 Vanuatu
Runner-up	2022 Vanuatu
Runner-up	2026 Fiji
Third place	1988 Solomon Islands
Third place	2000 Fiji
Third place	2023 New Caledonia

The Vanuatu men's national football team (French: Équipe du Vanuatu de football) represents Vanuatu in men's international football competitions. The team is governed by the Vanuatu Football Federation, which is currently a member of FIFA and the Oceania Football Confederation.

== History ==
=== Early years (1951–2022) ===
It was known as the New Hebrides until the New Hebrides became Republic of Vanuatu in 1980. It finished fourth in the OFC Nations Cup in 1973, 2000, and 2002. In the 2004 Oceania Nations Cup, Vanuatu beat New Zealand 4–2, preventing the regional powerhouse from making the final and, consequently, the running for the 2006 FIFA World Cup.

Vanuatu caused another shock in the 2007 South Pacific Games by knocking out the Solomon Islands for bronze medal and also enable to enter the second stage of qualification for the OFC Nations Cup and consequently a chance with a playoff for the 2010 FIFA World Cup held in South Africa. The last time they had won against Solomon Islands was back in 1998 and had since been on the receiving side of many losses save for one draw against them. In July 2008, Vanuatu faced two national teams from the Solomon Islands during the inaugural edition of the Wantok Cup. Vanuatu lost 1–2 to the Solomons' team A, but defeated their team B by two goals to one.

=== Recognition of the team efforts (2023–present) ===
In 2023, Vanuatu was invited for the 2023 Intercontinental Cup tournament held in India which is the team first tournament outside Oceania. In the first match on 9 June 2023, they would face Lebanon but suffered a 3–1 defeat. In the next match, Vanuatu conceded a late goal losing to host India on a narrow 1–0 lost. On 15 June 2023, Vanuatu found themselves with a bright smiles as they would go on to win Mongolia 1–0 thus earning them the 3 points and finishing in third place.

==== FIFA Series tournament ====
In 2024, FIFA invited Vanuatu to the 2024 FIFA Series tournament held from 21 to 26 March 2024 in Jeddah where they would face Guinea (CAF) and Brunei (AFC). On 21 March, Vanuatu faced their first ever opponent from the Africa continent, Guinea in a 6–0 lost.

=== First Oceanian final ===
Vanuatu progressed to the final of the OFC Nations Cup for the first time in 2024 and finished as runners-up of the tournament on 30 June 2024 after losing to New Zealand with a 3–0 scoreline.

Vanuatu then won the 2025 MSG Prime Minister's Cup.

== Team image ==
=== Kit sponsorship ===
Kit provider	Period
(Italy) Lotto	2011–2012
(Australia) Veto	2013
(United States) Nike	2014
(Vanuatu) Best Promotions	2015
(New Zealand) Pasifika	2016–2019
(Australia) KPI Sports	2019–2022
(Italy) Macron	2022–2023
(Italy) Lotto	2023–2024
(China) Cikers	2024–

== Results and fixtures ==
The following is a list of match results in the last 12 months, as well as any future matches that have been scheduled.

Win Draw Loss Fixture

=== 2025 ===
11 November 2025 MSG Prime Minister's Cup	Papua New Guinea development team	1–1	Vanuatu	Port Moresby, Papua New Guinea
16:00 UTC+10	Moses 73'	Report	Saniel 6'	Stadium: Sir John Guise Stadium

17 November 2025 MSG Prime Minister's Cup	Vanuatu	2–0	Fiji	Port Moresby, Papua New Guinea
16:00 UTC+10	K. Kaltack 50'; Iawak 62' (pen.)	Report		Stadium: PNG Football Stadium

20 November 2025 MSG Prime Minister's Cup semi-final	Vanuatu	2–1	Solomon Islands	Port Moresby, Papua New Guinea
19:00 UTC+10	Andrew 32'; Loloa 40'	Report	Supa 44'	Stadium: PNG Football Stadium

23 November 2025 MSG Prime Minister's Cup final	Papua New Guinea	2–2 (4–5 p)	Vanuatu	Port Moresby, Papua New Guinea
15:00 UTC+10	Kepo 56'; Paul 101'	Report	A. Saniel 20'; L. Tioni 94'	Stadium: Sir John Guise Stadium

=== 2026 ===
6 June Friendly	Vanuatu	2–1	Fiji	Port Vila, Vanuatu
16:30 UTC+11	Saniel 67'; Dunn 82' (o.g.)	Report	Mohammed 78'	Stadium: Freshwater Stadium; Referee: Médéric Lacour (New Caledonia)

9 June Friendly	Vanuatu	2–2	Fiji	Port Vila, Vanuatu
16:30 UTC+11	Soromon 35'; Saniel 49'		Thomas 21' (o.g.); Krishna 40'	Stadium: Freshwater Stadium

18 September 2026 MSG Prime Minister's Cup	Papua New Guinea	2–1	Vanuatu	Suva, Fiji
	Nalau Moses 85' Ezekiel Vela 87'	Report	Tony Kaltak 77'	Stadium: HFC Bank Stadium

21 September 2026 MSG Prime Minister's Cup	Fiji	0-1	Vanuatu	Suva, Fiji
			Bill Kaltfer Kaltack 70'	Stadium: HFC Bank Stadium

24 September 2026 MSG Prime Minister's Cup	Solomon Islands	v	Vanuatu	Suva, Fiji
				Stadium: HFC Bank Stadium

27 September 2026 MSG Prime Minister's Cup	Vanuatu	v	New Caledonia	Suva, Fiji
				Stadium: HFC Bank Stadium

== Coaching staff ==
Position	Name
Head coach	(Vanuatu) Richard Iwai
Assistant coach	(Vanuatu) Pinto Duro
Assistant coach	(Vanuatu) François Sakama
Team Manager	(Vanuatu) Peter Takaro
Goalkeeper coach	(Vanuatu) Jimmy Obed
Assistant Goalkeeper coach	(Vanuatu) Jean Yves Galinie
Physio	(Vanuatu) Albert Lata

=== Coaching history ===
New Hebrides

- (France) Pierre Reichert (1973–1987)

Vanuatu

- (England) Terry O'Donnell (1987–1993)
- (Vanuatu) Saby Natonga (1996)
- (Vanuatu) Alwyn Job (1998)
- (Uruguay) Juan Carlos Buzzetti (2000–2004)
- (England) Joe Szekeres (2004–2007)
- (Vanuatu) Robert Calvo (2007–2008)
- (Vanuatu) Willian Malas (2008)
- (Uruguay) Jorge Añón (2009)
- (Vanuatu) Saby Natonga (2011–2012)
- (Vanuatu) Percy Avock (2012–2015)
- (Vanuatu) Moise Poida (2015–2017)
- (Vanuatu) Etienne Mermer (2017–2018)
- (Northern Ireland) Paul Munster (2019)
- (Vanuatu) Etienne Mermer (2019–2022)
- (Vanuatu) George Amos (2022)
- (Uruguay) Juan Carlos Buzzetti (2022)
- (Brazil) Emerson Alcântara (2022)
- (Vanuatu) Etienne Mermer (2022–2023)
- (Brazil) Emerson Alcântara (2023–2024)
- (Brazil) Juliano Schmeling (2024–2025)
- (Vanuatu) Joel Rarua (2025)
- (Vanuatu) Richard Iwai (2025)
- (Germany) Lars Hopp (2025–2026)
- (Vanuatu) Richard Iwai (2026–)

== Players ==
=== Current squad ===
The following 23 players were called up for the PacificAus Sports Football Series in September 2024.

Caps and goals are correct as of 30 June 2024, after the match against New Zealand.

No.	Pos.	Player	Date of birth (age)	Caps	Goals	Club
	GK	Massing Kalotang	26 August 2002 (age 24)	8	0	(Vanuatu Football Federation) Erakor Gold Star
	GK	Anthony Quai		0	0	(Vanuatu Football Federation) Penama
	GK	Dick Sablan	23 December 1996 (age 29)	0	0	(Vanuatu Football Federation) Ifira Black Bird
	DF	Michel Coulon	3 December 1995 (age 30)	17	1	(Vanuatu Football Federation) Vanuatu United
	DF	Timothy Boulet	29 November 1998 (age 27)	15	0	(Vanuatu Football Federation) Ifira Black Bird
	DF	Selwym Vatu	13 June 1998 (age 28)	13	0	(Vanuatu Football Federation) ABM Galaxy
	DF	Tasso Jeffrey	12 August 1998 (age 28)	12	0	(Football Australia) Western Strikers
	DF	Jacques Wanemut	2 February 1992 (age 34)	4	0	(Vanuatu Football Federation) Ifira Black Bird
	DF	Zidane Maguekon	3 June 2000 (age 26)	1	0	(Vanuatu Football Federation) Classic
	DF	Thomas Salemu		0	0	(Vanuatu Football Federation) Ifira Black Bird
	DF	Joshua Tokio	4 April 2001 (age 25)	0	0	(Vanuatu Football Federation) Ifira Black Bird
	MF	John Alick	25 April 1991 (age 35)	25	0	(Papua New Guinea Football Association) PNG Hekari
	MF	John Wohale	9 July 1997 (age 29)	17	1	(Vanuatu Football Federation) Ifira Black Bird
	MF	Jared Clark	21 January 1998 (age 28)	8	0	(Football Australia) FK Beograd
	MF	Harry Norman	31 December 2003 (age 22)	8	1	(Vanuatu Football Federation) Exe Green Rovers
	MF	Alick Worworbu	27 August 1997 (age 29)	4	0	(Vanuatu Football Federation) Yatel
	FW	Alex Saniel	8 November 1996 (age 29)	23	1	(Vanuatu Football Federation) Vanuatu United
	FW	Johnathan Spokeyjack	13 November 1998 (age 27)	16	2	(Vanuatu Football Federation) Ifira Black Bird
	FW	Godine Tenene	3 May 1998 (age 28)	16	3	(Vanuatu Football Federation) Ifira Black Bird
	FW	Tony Kaltak	5 November 1996 (age 29)	16	15	(Vanuatu Football Federation) Erakor Gold Star
	FW	Jean Kaltak	19 August 1994 (age 32)	8	9	(Vanuatu Football Federation) Erakor Gold Star
	FW	Tonly Kalotang	19 May 1997 (age 29)	2	0	(Vanuatu Football Federation) Ifira Black Bird
	FW	Jordy Tasip	14 July 2000 (age 26)	0	0	(Vanuatu Football Federation) Vanuatu United

=== Recent call-ups ===
The following players have also been called up to the national squad in the last twelve months.

Pos.	Player	Date of birth (age)	Caps	Goals	Club	Latest call-up

== Player records ==
As of 23 November 2025
Players in bold are still active with Vanuatu.

=== Most appearances ===
Rank	Name	Caps	Goals	Career
1	**Kensi Tangis** (Note: Also appeared in one match against New Zealand U-23s, however this is not recognised as an official match by FIFA.)	38	9	2011–present
2	Richard Iwai	34	20	2000–2011
3	Etienne Mermer	33	15	1998–2008
4	**Brian Kaltak**	32	5	2011–present
5	**Bong Kalo** (Note: Kalo also appeared in three matches, scoring two goals, against two international 'B' sides and New Zealand U-23s, however these are not recognised as official matches by FIFA.)	31	4	2015–present
6	**Alex Saniel** (Note: Saniel also appeared in three matches, scoring two goals, against international 'B' sides in the MSG Prime Minister's Cup, however these are not recognised as official matches by FIFA.)	30	3	2017–present
6	Fedy Vava	30	2	2000–2012
8	**John Alick** (Note: Also appeared in two matches against international 'B' sides, however these are not recognised as official matches by FIFA.)	29	2	2017–present
8	Lexa Bibi	29	2	2000–2004
8	Seimata Chilia	29	9	2000–2011

=== Top goalscorers ===
Rank	Name	Goals	Caps	Ratio	Career
1	Richard Iwai	20	34	0.59	2000–2011
2	Tony Kaltack	15	16	0.94	2016–2019
2	Etienne Mermer	15	33	0.45	1998–2008
4	Seule Soromon	10	10	1	2007–2011
4	**Jean Kaltack** (Note: Also appeared in one match against an international 'B' side, however this is not recognised as an official match by FIFA.)	10	11	0.91	2011–present
4	**Azariah Soromon** (Note: Also appeared in a match against an international 'B' side and New Zealand U-23s, however these are not recognised as official matches by FIFA.)	10	24	0.42	2017–present
7	Seimata Chilia	9	29	0.31	2000–2011
7	**Kensi Tangis**	9	38	0.24	2011–present
9	Bill Nicholls	6	8	0.75	2015–2019
9	**Mitch Cooper**	6	10	0.6	2019–present
9	François Sakama	6	12	0.5	2007–2015
9	Robert Tasso	6	12	0.5	2011–2016

== Competitive record ==
=== FIFA World Cup ===
FIFA World Cup record										FIFA World Cup qualification record					
Year	Host	Result	Position	Pld	W	D	L	GF	GA	Pld	W	D	L	GF	GA
1930 to 1986		Not a FIFA member								Not a FIFA member					
1990	Italy	Did not enter								Did not enter					
1994	United States	Did not qualify								4	0	0	4	1	18
1998	France	Did not qualify								2	0	1	1	2	3
2002	South Korea; Japan	Did not qualify								4	1	0	3	11	21
2006	Germany	Did not qualify								9	4	1	4	21	11
2010	South Africa	Did not qualify								12	5	1	6	30	19
2014	Brazil	Did not qualify								3	1	0	2	8	9
2018	Russia	Did not qualify								3	1	0	2	3	8
2022	Qatar	Withdrew								Withdrew					
2026	Canada; Mexico; United States	Did not qualify								3	1	0	2	5	11
2030	Morocco; Portugal; Spain	To be determined								To be determined					
2034	Saudi Arabia	To be determined								To be determined					
Total			0/10							40	13	3	24	81	100

=== OFC Nations Cup ===
Oceania Cup / OFC Nations Cup record										Qualification record					
Year	Round	Position	Pld	W	D	L	GF	GA	Squad	Pld	W	D	L	GF	GA
as New Hebrides
(New Zealand) 1973	Fourth place	4th	5	1	1	3	5	10	Squad	No qualification					
(New Caledonia) 1980	Group stage	7th	3	0	0	3	6	9	—N/a	No qualification					
as Vanuatu
1996	Did not qualify									4	0	1	3	5	12
(Australia) 1998	Group stage	5th	2	0	0	2	2	13	Squad	4	2	1	1	8	6
(French Polynesia) 2000	Fourth place	4th	4	1	0	3	5	8	Squad	4	2	0	2	12	7
(New Zealand) 2002	Fourth place	4th	5	2	0	3	2	6	Squad	Qualified automatically					
(Australia) 2004	Group stage	6th	5	1	0	4	5	9	Squad	4	3	1	0	16	2
2008	Fourth place	4th	6	1	1	4	5	13	Squad	6	4	0	2	25	6
(Solomon Islands) 2012	Group stage	5th	3	1	0	2	8	9	Squad	Qualified automatically					
(Papua New Guinea) 2016	Group stage	7th	3	1	0	2	3	8	Squad	Qualified automatically					
(Fiji) (Vanuatu) 2024	Runners-up	2nd	4	2	0	2	3	8	Squad	Qualified automatically					
Total	Runners-up	10/11	40	10	2	28	44	93	—	22	11	3	8	66	33

=== Pacific Games ===
Pacific Games record
Year	Round	Position	Pld	W	D*	L	GF	GA
as New Hebrides
(Fiji) 1963	Group stage	6th	1	0	0	1	3	6
(New Caledonia) 1966	Bronze medal	3rd	4	1	2	1	9	14
(Papua New Guinea) 1969	Group stage	5th	5	1	1	3	13	13
(French Polynesia) 1971	Silver medal	2nd	4	2	1	1	9	12
(Guam) 1975	Group stage	5th	2	0	0	2	1	6
(Fiji) 1979	Fifth place	5th	6	4	0	2	19	6
as Vanuatu
(Samoa) 1983	Group stage	6th	1	0	0	1	0	6
(New Caledonia) 1987	Fourth place	4th	6	2	1	3	16	13
(Papua New Guinea) 1991	Fourth place	4th	5	2	0	3	9	8
(French Polynesia) 1995	Fourth place	4th	5	2	0	3	10	9
(Fiji) 2003	Bronze medal	3rd	6	3	3	0	23	3
(Samoa) 2007	Bronze medal	3rd	6	4	0	2	25	6
(New Caledonia) 2011	Group stage	6th	5	4	0	1	18	7
(Papua New Guinea) 2015	See Vanuatu national under-23 football team							
(Samoa) 2019	Group stage	5th	4	2	1	1	25	2
(Solomon Islands) 2023	Semi-finals	4th	4	1	1	2	9	6
Total	15/15	0 Titles	64	28	10	26	189	117

=== Melanesia Cup ===
Melanesia Cup record
Year	Round	Position	Pld	W	D*	L	GF	GA
(Solomon Islands) 1988	Third place	3rd	4	1	0	3	2	19
(Fiji) 1989	Fifth place	5th	4	0	0	4	2	12
(New Caledonia) 1990	Champions	1st	4	2	2	0	4	2
(Vanuatu) 1992	Fourth place	4th	3	0	0	3	1	6
(Solomon Islands) 1994	Fifth place	5th	4	0	1	3	5	12
(Vanuatu) 1998	Runners-up	2nd	4	2	1	1	8	6
(Fiji) 2000	Third place	3rd	4	2	0	2	12	7
MSG Prime Minister's Cup
(Vanuatu) 2022	Group stage	5th	2	0	1	1	2	3
(New Caledonia) 2023	Third place	3rd	3	1	0	2	1	5
(Solomon Islands) 2024	Fourth place	4th	4	1	1	2	6	8
(Papua New Guinea) 2025	Champions	1st	4	2	2	0	7	4
Total	11/11	2 Titles	40	11	8	21	50	84

=== Wantok Cup ===
Wantok Cup record
Year	Round	Position	Pld	W	D*	L	GF	GA
(Solomon Islands) 2008	Runners-up	2nd	2	1	0	1	3	3
(Solomon Islands) 2011 (Informal)	Runners-up	2nd	2	0	1	1	1	2
(Vanuatu) 2011 (Informal)	Champions	1st	2	1	1	0	2	0
Total	3/3	1 Title	6	2	2	2	6	5

== Head-to-head record ==
Up to matches played on 23 September 2026.

Team	Pld	W	D	L	GF	GA	GD	WPCT
American Samoa	4	4	0	0	39	1	+38	100.00
Australia	4	0	0	4	0	7	−7	0.00
Brunei	1	0	0	1	2	3	−1	0.00
Cook Islands	1	1	0	0	8	1	+7	100.00
Estonia	1	0	0	1	0	1	−1	0.00
Fiji	42	14	9	19	49	87	−38	33.33
Guam	3	3	0	0	14	0	+14	100.00
Guinea	1	0	0	1	0	6	−6	0.00
India	1	0	0	1	0	1	−1	0.00
Indonesia	1	0	0	1	0	6	−6	0.00
Kiribati	1	1	0	0	18	0	+18	100.00
Lebanon	1	0	0	1	1	3	−2	0.00
Mongolia	1	1	0	0	1	0	+1	100.00
New Caledonia	40	8	7	25	45	101	−56	20.00
New Zealand	15	1	0	14	11	73	−62	6.67
Papua New Guinea	25	9	6	10	35	33	+2	36.00
Samoa (Note: Includes results as Western Samoa.)	6	6	0	0	40	2	+38	100.00
Solomon Islands	39	8	8	23	44	86	−42	20.51
Tahiti	27	5	3	19	28	66	−38	18.52
Tonga	5	5	0	0	33	2	+31	100.00
Tuvalu	4	4	0	0	22	1	+21	100.00
Wallis and Futuna	2	2	0	0	10	1	+9	100.00
Total	225	72	33	120	400	481	−81	32.00

Source: 1951–July 1980 results and July 1980–present results.

== Honours ==
=== Continental ===
- OFC Nations Cup
  - (silver) Runners-up (1): 2024

=== Subcontinental ===
- Pacific Games
  - (silver) Silver medal (1): 1971
  - (bronze) Bronze medal (3): 1966, 2003, 2007
- Pacific Mini Games
  - (gold) Gold medal (1): 2017
- Melanesia Cup / MSG Prime Minister's Cup
  - (gold) Champions (2): 1990, 2025
  - (silver) Runners-up (3): 1998, 2022, 2026
  - (bronze) Third place (3): 1988, 2000, 2023

=== Friendly ===
- Wantok Cup
  - (gold) Champions (1): 2011–II
  - (silver) Runners-up (2): 2008, 2011–I

=== Summary ===
Including honours in competitions directly organized/recognized by FIFA or an affiliated confederation.

Competition	1st place, gold medalist(s)	2nd place, silver medalist(s)	3rd place, bronze medalist(s)	Total
OFC Nations Cup	0	1	0	1
Total	0	1	0	1

== Historical kits ==
1987 Home	1992 Home	1992 Away	1999	2000 Home	2002 Home	2004 Home	2004 Away

2007	2009	2011 Home	2011 Away	2012 Home	2012 Away	2016 Home	2017 Home

2017 Away	2017	2019 Home	2022 Home	2022 Away	2024 Home	2024 Away

== See also ==
- Vanuatu national under-15 football team
- Vanuatu national under-17 football team
- Vanuatu national under-20 football team
- Vanuatu national under-23 football team
- Vanuatu women's national football team
- Vanuatu women's national under-20 football team
