= 2024 MSG Prime Minister's Cup =

Tournament details
- Host country: Solomon Islands
- City: Honiara
- Dates: 9–21 December
- Teams: 5 (from 1 confederation)
- Venue: 1 (in 1 host city)

Final positions
- Champions: Papua New Guinea (2nd title)
- Runners-up: Fiji
- Third place: Solomon Islands

Tournament statistics
- Matches played: 10
- Goals scored: 31 (3.1 per match)
- Top scorers: (Solomon Islands) Don Keana; (Solomon Islands) Rovu Boyers; (Papua New Guinea) Alwin Komolong; (Fiji) Sairusi Nalaubu (3 goals)

The 2024 MSG Prime Minister's Cup was held from 9–21 December. The Solomon Islands hosted the competition, with matches played in Honiara at the Lawson Tama Stadium and at the National Stadium.

The Solomon Islands was the defending champion after winning the 2023 edition of the tournament. Usual participants New Caledonia withdrew from the competition.

Papua New Guinea won the competition for its second-ever title.

== Format ==
The five competing teams faced each other once in a round-robin style tournament the winner of the group wins the 2024 MSG Prime Minister's Cup. A total of 10 matches will be played on five matchdays.

== Matches ==
All times are local, (UTC+11).

=== Table ===
Pos	Team	Pld	W	D	L	GF	GA	GD	Pts	Qualification
1	Papua New Guinea (C)	4	3	1	0	7	4	+3	10	Champion
2	Fiji	4	2	2	0	8	3	+5	8	
3	Solomon Islands (H)	4	2	0	2	9	7	+2	6	
4	Vanuatu	4	1	1	2	6	8	−2	4	
5	Solomon Islands "B"	4	0	0	4	1	9	−8	0	

(C) Champions; (H) Hosts
9 December 2024
13:00

Solomon Islands "B"	0–1	Papua New Guinea
		A. Komolong 27' (pen.)

Lawson Tama Stadium, Honiara
9 December 2024
15:00

Solomon Islands	4–1	Vanuatu
Boyers 22' (pen.), 48'; Keana 30', 79'		King 52'

Lawson Tama Stadium, Honiara
12 December 2024
13:00

Fiji	1–1	Vanuatu
Nalaubu 60'		Saniel 90+3'

Lawson Tama Stadium, Honiara
12 December 2024
15:00

Solomon Islands	2–0	Solomon Islands "B"
Leslie 50'; Hou 85'

Lawson Tama Stadium, Honiara
15 December 2024
15:00

Papua New Guinea	1–1	Fiji
Gunemba 23'		Nalaubu 76'

National Stadium, Honiara
15 December 2024
18:00

Vanuatu	3–1	Solomon Islands "B"
Saniel 45'; Kalo 77' (pen.); J. Kaltak 81'		Francis 64'

National Stadium, Honiara
18 December 2024
16:00

Solomon Islands	2–3	Papua New Guinea
Boyers 21'; Keana 87'		Komolong 28', 90+4'; Rani 72'

National Stadium, Honiara
18 December 2024
18:00

Fiji	3–0	Solomon Islands "B"
Hughes 72'; Tirau 73'; Begg 87'

National Stadium, Honiara
21 December 2024
16:00

Vanuatu	1–2	Papua New Guinea
J. Kaltak 84'		Kepo 13'; Gunemba 58'

National Stadium, Honiara
21 December 2024
18:00

Fiji	3–1	Solomon Islands
Matanisiga 33'; Nalaubu 45+2'; Dunn 56'		Kaua 79'

National Stadium, Honiara

== Goalscorers ==
There were 31 goals scored in 10 matches, for an average of 3.1 goals per match.

3 goals

- (Solomon Islands) Don Keana
- (Solomon Islands) Rovu Boyers
- (Papua New Guinea) Alwin Komolong
- (Fiji) Sairusi Nalaubu

2 goals

- (Vanuatu) Alex Saniel
- (Vanuatu) Jean Kaltak
- (Papua New Guinea) Raymond Gunemba

1 goal

- (Vanuatu) Nicolas King
- (Solomon Islands) Bobby Leslie
- (Solomon Islands) Alvin Hou
- (Solomon Islands) Paul Francis
- (Solomon Islands) Atkin Kaua
- (Vanuatu) Bong Kalo
- (Papua New Guinea) Solomon Rani
- (Papua New Guinea) Ati Kepo
- (Fiji) Begg
- (Fiji) Pensoni Tirau
- (Fiji) Setareki Hughes
- (Fiji) Thomas Dunn
- (Fiji) Gabieieli Matanisiga
