= Melanesian Spearhead Group =

Intergovernmental organization

Melanesian Spearhead Group Groupe Fer de lance mélanésien
- Emblem

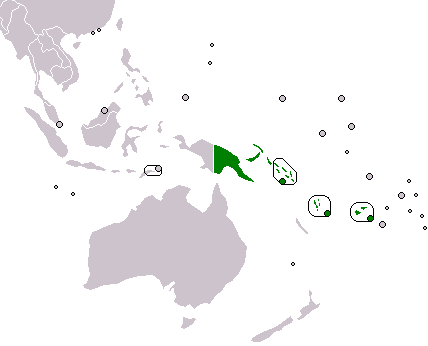
- Map indicating the membership of the Melanesian Spearhead Group.
- Seat: Port Vila, Vanuatu
- Membership: 5 members: Fiji; Papua New Guinea; Solomon Islands; Vanuatu; Kanak and Socialist National Liberation Front; 1 associate: Indonesia; 2 observers: Timor-Leste; United Liberation Movement for West Papua

Leaders
  - Director General: (Fiji) Amena Yauvoli

Establishment
  - Establishment: 1986

Area
  - Total: 585,560 km^{2} (226,090 sq mi)

Population
  - 2026 estimate: ▲13,085,982
  - Density: 22.34/km^{2} (57.9/sq mi)
- GDP (PPP): 2026 estimate
  - Total: ▲$ 71.767 billion
  - Per capita: ▲$ 5,484
- Currency: 5 currencies: (Indonesia) Rupiah; (Fiji) Dollar; (Papua New Guinea) Kina; (Solomon Islands) Dollar; (Vanuatu) Vatu
- Time zone: 5 time zones: UTC+7 (Indonesia); UTC+8 (Indonesia); UTC+9 (Indonesia); UTC+10 (Papua New Guinea); UTC+11 (Solomon Islands) (Vanuatu); UTC+12 (Fiji)
- Website www.msgsec.info
- 1. If considered a single entity.

The Melanesian Spearhead Group (MSG; French: Groupe Fer de lance mélanésien) is an intergovernmental organization, composed of the four Melanesian states of Fiji, Papua New Guinea, Solomon Islands and Vanuatu, and the Kanak and Socialist National Liberation Front of New Caledonia. In June 2015, Indonesia was recognized as an associate member.

It was founded as a political gathering in 1986. On 23 March 2007, members signed the Agreement Establishing the Melanesian Spearhead Group, formalizing the group under international law. It is headquartered in Port Vila, Vanuatu. A secretariat building was constructed by the People's Republic of China and handed over to the MSG in November 2007. The first Director General of the MSG Secretariat was Rima Ravusiro of Papua New Guinea. Amena Yauvoli of Fiji was the head of the MSG Secretariat from 2016.

== Purpose ==
Melanesian Spearhead Group was formed with focus to promote economic growth among Melanesian countries. The purposes of the group are:

1. To promote and strengthen inter membership trade, exchange of Melanesian cultures, traditions, values and sovereign equality;
2. To foster economic and technical cooperation between the members; and
3. To align member countries' policies and further members' shared goals of economical growth, sustainable development, good governance and security.

One of the key features of the MSG is the Melanesian Spearhead Group Trade Agreement, a sub-regional preferential trade agreement established to foster and accelerate economic development through trade relations and provide a political framework for regular consultations and review on the status of the Agreement, with a view to ensuring that trade both in terms of exports and imports is undertaken in a genuine spirit of Melanesian Solidarity and is done on a most favoured nation (MFN) basis. Negotiations are held regularly between the members' leaders to consider the progress and developments of the agreement. After a revision in 2005, it covers 180 articles free of fiscal duty.

== History ==
=== Formation ===
The Melanesian Spearhead Group (MSG) was conceived in 1986 between the three Melanesian Pacific Island Countries namely Papua New Guinea, Vanuatu and Solomon Islands. The MSG Trade Agreement was signed in 1993 by Papua New Guinea, Solomon Islands and Vanuatu. At the 6th Melanesian Spearhead Group (MSG) Trade and Economic Officials’ Meeting on 16 April 1997 in Honiara, the Fiji delegation indicated its willingness to accede to it. This initiative was endorsed at the 1997 MSG Leaders Summit. Fiji became a formal member of the MSG Trade Agreement on 14 April 1998. The 9th MSG Trade & Economic Officials meeting was held in Papua New Guinea on 29 and 30 November 2000. This meeting saw the acceptance of the expansion of the MSG Product Schedule tariff headings from four to six digits, thereby facilitating MSG trade by removing the ambiguity in product identification at Customs points of entry. The agreement is General Agreement on Tariffs and Trade (GATT) consistent and has been approved and accorded recognition by the World Trade Organization (WTO) Committee on Regional Arrangements to be compatible and meeting the requirements of Article 24 of the GATT/WTO Agreement.

The Melanesian Spearhead Group Secretariat was established in May 2008 after years of operating on an ad-hoc basic. The opening of a permanent office in Port Vila, Vanuatu, signaled a new phase for the MSG group as it ventured into organizing and managing its affairs in a more structured manner.

=== Politics ===
More recently, the Melanesian Spearhead Group got heavily involved in the political discussions following Fiji's suspension from the Pacific Islands Forum in May 2009.

In July 2010, Fiji expelled Australia's acting high commissioner accusing the latter of causing the postponement of a so-called Engaging Fiji meeting. Australia responded that it had to do with the lack of democracy in the country. An alternate meeting was held instead despite pressure from Australia and New Zealand. It was attended by Prime Minister Michael Somare of Papua New Guinea, Prime Minister Derek Sikua of the Solomon Islands, President Anote Tong of Kiribati, Prime Minister Apisai Ielemia of Tuvalu, and Prime Minister Frank Bainimarama of Fiji.

Melanesian Spearhead Group is also involved in the issue of Papua, which involves the Indonesian government and a West Papuan separatist movement. Melanesian Spearhead Group's role in raising the international profile of New Caledonia's Kanak independence movement, has prompted West Papuan Independence activists to recognise the significance of its membership. The West Papua National Council for Liberation (WPNCL) hopes to use Melanesian Spearhead Group as an international platform to fight for independence.

Indonesia, however, also applied for MSG membership in 2010, arguing that Indonesia is home to 11 million Melanesians mainly residing in 5 provinces in Eastern Indonesia; Papua, West Papua, Maluku, North Maluku and East Nusa Tenggara. Indonesia won observer status in 2011 with the support of Fiji and Papua New Guinea. East Timor was granted observer status in 2011.

In May 2013, Buchtar Tabuni, the leader of the National Committee for West Papua (KNPB) supported the notion that if West Papua was granted independence, he would support them joining the MSG. The WPNCL submitted an unsuccessful application to the MSG in October 2013. The MSG advised that West Papua independence organizations must first unite for any future applications to be considered.

The United Liberation Movement for West Papua (ULMWP) was formed in December 2014. A second application of West Papua independence movement has been submitted in 2015 by the ULMWP, led by spokesperson Benny Wenda.

=== Expansion ===
In 24 to 26 June 2015, the summit meeting of the member countries in Honiara, Solomon Islands concluded with key decisions; Indonesia was elevated to associate member of the group — making them the official representative of West Papua region, while the United Liberation Movement for West Papua (ULMWP) remained as an observer. The ULMWP was considered only as the representative of West Papuans outside the country.

Despite being denied of full membership, ULMWP secretary-general Octavianus Mote regarded the observer status positively, saying the diplomatic recognition would help them in their cause. "We might not be a full member of the MSG, but a door has opened to us. We will sit across a table from Indonesia as equal," he said.

However, Indonesia's membership of the MSG has giving them a greater influence in Melanesian politics than the ULMWP. In MSG, Indonesia's official representation will be the governors of Indonesia's five Melanesian provinces. Fijian prime minister Frank Bainimarama, who supported Indonesian membership, argued that his vote was guided by a number of main principles in approaching the West Papuan issue. "Indonesian sovereignty over West Papua cannot be questioned, and the province is an integral part of Indonesia, so when we deal with West Papua and its people, MSG has no choice but to deal with Indonesia, in a positive and constructive manner," he said. Following the decision of elevating Indonesia to associate member, the government of Indonesia, for the first time, hosted the Melanesian Cultural Festival 2015 in Kupang, East Nusa Tenggara from 26 to 30 October 2015, which is aimed at improving cooperation among Melanesian countries. The festival was participated by all members of MSG except Vanuatu, and also Timor Leste.

In 2024, Ishmael Toroama, president of the Autonomous Region of Bougainville in Papua New Guinea, announced that his government intended to apply for observer status with the MSG, as one of its first steps in developing foreign affairs activities in advance of its planned independence in 2027.

== Membership ==
Overview of Melanesian Spearhead Group members
Country	Head of Government	Status governing
East Timor	President Jose Ramos Horta	observer
Fiji	Prime Minister Sitiveni Rabuka	sovereign state
Indonesia	President Prabowo Subianto	associated member
New Caledonia	FLNKS Head Representative Victor Tutugoro Kanak and Socialist; National Liberation Front – FLNKS	party
Papua New Guinea	Prime Minister James Marape	sovereign state
Solomon Islands	Prime Minister Jeremiah Manele	sovereign state
Vanuatu	Prime Minister Charlot Salwai	sovereign state
West Papua	ULMWP Interim President Benny Wenda United Liberation Movement for West Papua – ULMWP	observer

Melanesian Spearhead Group GDP Nominal (2024)
1. East Timor (2.05%)
2. Fiji (6.07%)
3. Indonesia (46.9%)
4. New Caledonia (9.66%)
5. Papua New Guinea (32.3%)
6. Solomon Islands (1.81%)
7. Vanuatu (1.23%)

Population and demography of members of the Melanesian Spearhead Group
Country		Population		Status governing
East Timor		1,340,513		observer
Fiji		926,276		sovereign state
Indonesia	East Nusa Tenggara	5,656,000	14,705,600	provinces of associate member
Indonesia	Maluku	1,945,600	14,705,600	provinces of associate member
Indonesia	North Maluku	1,355,600	14,705,600	provinces of associate member
Indonesia	Southwest Papua	627,100	14,705,600	provinces of associate member
Indonesia	West Papua	578,700	14,705,600	provinces of associate member
Indonesia	Papua	1,060,600	14,705,600	provinces of associate member
Indonesia	Central Papua	1,472,900	14,705,600	provinces of associate member
Indonesia	Highland Papua	1,467,000	14,705,600	provinces of associate member
Indonesia	South Papua	542,100	14,705,600	provinces of associate member
New Caledonia	Kanak and Socialist; National Liberation Front	271,407		political party
Papua New Guinea		8,935,000		sovereign state
Solomon Islands		652,857		sovereign state
Vanuatu		307,815		sovereign state

Melanesian Spearhead Group GDP PPP (2024)
1. East Timor (2.84%)
2. Fiji (6.37%)
3. Indonesia (65.8%)
4. New Caledonia (4.48%)
5. Papua New Guinea (19.2%)
6. Solomon Islands (0.88%)
7. Vanuatu (0.44%)

Economic overview of members of the Melanesian Spearhead Group
Country		GDP 2024 (in billion $)		GDP PPP 2024 (in billion $)		Status governing
East Timor		2.015		6.622		observer
Fiji		5.949		14.867		sovereign state
Indonesia	East Nusa Tenggara	8.654	46.000	28.914	153.695	provinces of associate member
Indonesia	Maluku	3.949	46.000	13.195	153.695	provinces of associate member
Indonesia	North Maluku	6.038	46.000	20.175	153.695	provinces of associate member
Indonesia	Southwest Papua	2.335	46.000	7.801	153.695	provinces of associate member
Indonesia	West Papua	4.802	46.000	16.044	153.695	provinces of associate member
Indonesia	Papua	5.416	46.000	18.095	153.695	provinces of associate member
Indonesia	Central Papua	11.028	46.000	36.846	153.695	provinces of associate member
Indonesia	Highland Papua	1.674	46.000	5.594	153.695	provinces of associate member
Indonesia	South Papua	2.104	46.000	7.031	153.695	provinces of associate member
New Caledonia	Kanak and Socialist; National Liberation Front	9.480		10.460		political party
Papua New Guinea		31.654		44.810		sovereign state
Solomon Islands		1.777		2.054		sovereign state
Vanuatu		1.206		1.025		sovereign state

== Meetings ==
MSG Formal Summits
No	Date	Location	Host	Host leader
18th	March 2011	Suva	Fiji	Voreqe Bainimarama
19th	13–21 June 2013	Nouméa	FLNKS	Victor Tutugoro
20th	18–26 June 2015	Honiara	Solomon Islands	Manasseh Sogavare
21st	10–15 February 2018	Port Moresby	Papua New Guinea	Peter O'Neill
22nd	19–24 August 2023	Port Vila	Vanuatu	Ishmael Kalsakau

== See also ==
- Polynesian Leaders Group, launched in 2011, partly as a response to the MSG
- Pacific Islands Forum
