= Tahiti national football team results (1952–1999) =

This page details the match results and statistics of the Tahiti national football team from 1952 to 1999.

The Tahiti national football team is the national team of French Polynesia and is controlled by the Fédération Tahitienne de Football. The team consists of a selection of players from French Polynesia, not just Tahiti.

Tahiti played their first full match on 21 September 1952 when they recorded a 2–2 draw at home against New Zealand. Their first competitive match came almost 11 years later when they entered the South Pacific Games for the first time in 1963. Finishing third, Tahiti set a new record winning margin for the national team as they defeated the Solomon Islands 18–0. This was bettered at the 1971 Games when Tahiti recorded a 30–0 win over the Cook Islands.

In 1973, Tahiti competed in the inaugural OFC Nations Cup in New Zealand. Reaching the final following an undefeated group stage, Tahiti lost 2–0 to the hosts New Zealand.

== Key ==
Key to matches

- Att.=Match attendance
- (H)=Home ground
- (A)=Away ground
- (N)=Neutral ground

Key to record by opponent

- Pld=Games played
- W=Games won
- D=Games drawn
- L=Games lost
- GF=Goals for
- GA=Goals against

== Results ==
Tahiti's score is shown first in each case.

No.	Date	Venue	Opponents	Score	Competition	Tahiti scorers	Att.	Ref.
1	21 September 1952	Papeete (H)	New Zealand	2–2	Friendly	Unknown	—	
2	28 September 1952	Papeete (H)	New Zealand	3–5	Friendly	Unknown	—	
3	September 1953	New Caledonia (A)	New Caledonia	1–4	Friendly	Unknown	—	
4	September 1953	New Caledonia (A)	New Caledonia	0–5	Friendly		—	
5	September 1953	New Hebrides (A)	New Hebrides	4–2	Friendly	Unknown	—	
6	July 1955	French Polynesia (H)	New Caledonia	1–1	Friendly	Unknown	—	
7	July 1955	French Polynesia (H)	New Caledonia	3–1	Friendly	Unknown	—	
8	September 1957	New Caledonia (A)	New Caledonia	0–2	Friendly		—	
9	September 1957	New Caledonia (A)	New Caledonia	1–2	Friendly	Unknown	—	
10	September 1957	New Caledonia (A)	New Caledonia	4–2	Friendly	Unknown	—	
11	9 September 1957	French Polynesia (H)	New Hebrides	2–1	Friendly	Unknown	—	
12	July 1959	French Polynesia (H)	New Caledonia	2–4	Friendly	Unknown	—	
13	July 1959	French Polynesia (H)	New Caledonia	3–1	Friendly	Unknown	—	
14	5 September 1960	French Polynesia (H)	New Zealand	1–5	Friendly	Unknown	—	
15	12 September 1960	French Polynesia (H)	New Zealand	1–2	Friendly	Unknown	—	
16	September 1961	New Caledonia (A)	New Caledonia	1–2	Friendly	Unknown	—	
17	September 1961	New Caledonia (A)	New Caledonia	2–2	Friendly	Unknown	—	
18	September 1961	New Caledonia (A)	New Caledonia	0–3	Friendly		—	
19	1 September 1963	Buckhurst Park, Suva (N)	New Caledonia	1–2 (a.e.t.)	1963 South Pacific Games	Nena	—	
20	6 September 1963	Buckhurst Park, Suva (N)	Solomon Islands	18–0	1963 South Pacific Games	Unknown	—	
21	September 1964	French Polynesia (H)	New Caledonia	0–2	Friendly		—	
22	September 1964	French Polynesia (H)	New Caledonia	4–1	Friendly	Unknown	—	
23	September 1965	New Caledonia (A)	New Caledonia	1–2	Friendly	Unknown	—	
24	September 1965	New Caledonia (A)	New Caledonia	1–4	Friendly	Unknown	—	
25	9 December 1966	Nouméa (N)	Papua New Guinea	4–3	1966 South Pacific Games	Unknown	—	
26	11 December 1966	Nouméa (N)	Wallis and Futuna	5–0	1966 South Pacific Games	Unknown	—	
27	15 December 1966	Nouméa (N)	New Hebrides	3–0	1966 South Pacific Games	Unknown	—	
28	17 December 1966	Nouméa (N)	New Caledonia	2–0	1966 South Pacific Games	Unknown	—	
29	December 1968	New Caledonia (A)	New Caledonia	1–0	Friendly	Unknown	—	
30	December 1968	New Caledonia (A)	New Caledonia	1–1	Friendly	Unknown	—	
31	14 August 1969	Club Germania, Port Moresby (N)	New Hebrides	3–3	1969 South Pacific Games	Unknown	—	
32	15 August 1969	Club Germania, Port Moresby (N)	Papua New Guinea	3–1	1969 South Pacific Games	Unknown	—	
33	16 August 1969	Club Germania, Port Moresby (N)	Fiji	2–0	1969 South Pacific Games	Unknown	—	
34	18 August 1969	Club Germania, Port Moresby (N)	Solomon Islands	7–0	1969 South Pacific Games	Unknown	—	
35	20 August 1969	Club Germania, Port Moresby (N)	New Caledonia	–	1969 South Pacific Games		—	
36	22 August 1969	Sir Hubert Murray Stadium, Port Moresby (N)	New Caledonia	1–2	1969 South Pacific Games	Cholita	—	
37	July 1970	French Polynesia (H)	New Caledonia	0–2	Friendly		—	
38	July 1970	French Polynesia (H)	New Caledonia	3–1	Friendly	Unknown	—	
39	30 August 1971	French Polynesia (H)	Fiji	5–2	Friendly	Unknown	—	
40	9 September 1971	Papeete (N)	Papua New Guinea	2–2	1971 South Pacific Games	Unknown	—	
41	13 September 1971	Papeete (N)	Cook Islands	30–0	1971 South Pacific Games	Unknown	—	
42	16 September 1971	Papeete (N)	New Hebrides	1–2	1971 South Pacific Games	Unknown	—	
43	18 September 1971	Papeete (N)	Papua New Guinea	8–1	1971 South Pacific Games	Unknown	—	
44	17 December 1972	New Caledonia (A)	New Caledonia	1–4	Friendly	Unknown	—	
45	17 February 1973	Newmarket Park, Auckland (N)	New Caledonia	2–1	1973 Oceania Cup	Bennett, Tumahai	—	
46	18 February 1973	Newmarket Park, Auckland (N)	New Zealand	1–1	1973 Oceania Cup	Bennett	—	
47	20 February 1973	Newmarket Park, Auckland (N)	New Hebrides	1–0	1973 Oceania Cup	Bennett	—	
48	23 February 1973	Newmarket Park, Auckland (N)	Fiji	4–0	1973 Oceania Cup	Carrara, Ng Fok, Malinowski, De Marigny	—	
49	24 February 1973	Newmarket Park, Auckland (N)	New Zealand	0–2	1973 Oceania Cup		—	
50	February 1974	French Polynesia (H)	New Caledonia	1–2	Friendly	Unknown	—	
51	February 1974	French Polynesia (H)	New Caledonia	2–1	Friendly	Unknown	—	
52	February 1974	French Polynesia (H)	New Caledonia	2–2	Friendly	Unknown	—	
53	2 August 1975	Guam (N)	New Caledonia	0–3	1975 South Pacific Games		—	
54	4 August 1975	Guam (N)	Papua New Guinea	4–2	1975 South Pacific Games	Unknown	—	
55	5 August 1975	Guam (N)	New Hebrides	3–0	1975 South Pacific Games	Unknown	—	
56	7 August 1975	Guam (N)	Fiji	3–0	1975 South Pacific Games	Unknown	—	
57	9 August 1975	Guam (N)	New Caledonia	2–1	1975 South Pacific Games	Unknown	—	
58	August 1978	New Caledonia (A)	New Caledonia	0–2	Friendly		—	
59	August 1978	New Caledonia (A)	New Caledonia	4–3	Friendly	Unknown	—	
60	7 August 1978	New Hebrides (A)	New Hebrides	4–2	Friendly	Unknown	—	
61	29 August 1979	Buckhurst Park, Suva (N)	Tonga	8–0	1979 South Pacific Games	Bennett (3), Aumeran (2), Kautai, Malinowski (2)	—	
62	30 August 1979	Buckhurst Park, Suva (N)	Tuvalu	18–0	1979 South Pacific Games	Unknown	—	
63	3 September 1979	Buckhurst Park, Suva (N)	New Hebrides	1–0	1979 South Pacific Games	Bennett	—	
64	4 September 1979	Buckhurst Park, Suva (N)	New Caledonia	3–2	1979 South Pacific Games	Bennett (2), Malinowski	—	
65	7 September 1979	Buckhurst Park, Suva (N)	Fiji	3–0	1979 South Pacific Games	Kautai, Bennett (2)	22,000	
66	25 February 1980	Stade Numa-Daly Magenta, Nouméa (N)	New Zealand	3–1	1980 Oceania Cup	Al. Wabealo, An. Wabealo, Bennett	—	
67	27 December 1980	Stade Numa-Daly Magenta, Nouméa (N)	Solomon Islands	12–1	1980 Oceania Cup	Unknown	—	
68	29 February 1980	Stade Numa-Daly Magenta, Nouméa (N)	Fiji	6–3	1980 Oceania Cup	Unknown	—	
69	1 March 1980	Stade Numa-Daly Magenta, Nouméa (N)	Australia	2–4	1980 Oceania Cup	An. Wabealo, Bennett	—	
70	March 1980	French Polynesia (H)	New Hebrides	1–0	Friendly	Unknown	—	
71	2 July 1980	Fiji (A)	Fiji	1–1	Friendly	Unknown	—	
72	July 1980	Fiji (A)	Fiji	1–1	Friendly	Unknown	—	
73	July 1980	Fiji (A)	Fiji	1–1	Friendly	Unknown	—	
74	2 September 1980	French Polynesia (H)	Mexico	0–1	Friendly		—	
75	March 1981	French Polynesia (H)	Fiji	1–0	Friendly	Unknown	—	
76	March 1981	French Polynesia (H)	Fiji	2–1	Friendly	Unknown	—	
77	7 July 1981	Lawson Tama Stadium, Honiara (N)	New Caledonia	1–0	1981 South Pacific Mini Games	Kautai	—	
78	8 July 1981	Lawson Tama Stadium, Honiara (N)	Western Samoa	13–0	1981 South Pacific Mini Games	Patia (6), Aumeran (4), Kautai, Voirin, Cadousteau	—	
79	9 July 1981	Lawson Tama Stadium, Honiara (N)	Vanuatu	1–1	1981 South Pacific Mini Games	Aumeran	—	
80	11 July 1981	Lawson Tama Stadium, Honiara (N)	Papua New Guinea	5–0	1981 South Pacific Mini Games	Kautai (2), Patia, Cadousteau, Aumeran	—	
81	13 July 1981	Lawson Tama Stadium, Honiara (N)	Solomon Islands	4–1	1981 South Pacific Mini Games	Malinowski (2), To'omaru, Suri (o.g.)	—	
82	14 July 1981	Lawson Tama Stadium, Honiara (N)	Fiji	6–0	1981 South Pacific Mini Games	Damien (2), Patia (3), Bennett	—	
83	15 July 1981	Lawson Tama Stadium, Honiara (N)	New Caledonia	1–0 (a.e.t.)	1981 South Pacific Mini Games	Bennett	—	
84	August 1983	Vanuatu (A)	Vanuatu	1–1	Friendly	Unknown	—	
85	August 1983	Vanuatu (A)	Vanuatu	5–1	Friendly	Unknown	—	
86	August 1983	Vanuatu (A)	Vanuatu	6–1	Friendly	Unknown	—	
87	20 August 1983	Apia Park, Apia (N)	Niue	14–0	1983 South Pacific Games	Unknown	—	
88	24 August 1983	Apia Park, Apia (N)	Papua New Guinea	2–1	1983 South Pacific Games	Unknown	—	
89	September 1983	Apia Park, Apia (N)	Western Samoa	2–0	1983 South Pacific Games	Unknown	—	
90	September 1983	Apia Park, Apia (N)	Papua New Guinea	6–1	1983 South Pacific Games	Unknown	—	
91	15 September 1983	Apia Park, Apia (N)	Fiji	1–0	1983 South Pacific Games	Unknown	—	
92	4 July 1985	Fiji (A)	Fiji	1–0	Friendly	Unknown	—	
93	11 July 1985	Fiji (A)	Fiji	1–0	Friendly	Unknown	—	
94	14 July 1985	Fiji (A)	Fiji	2–1	Friendly	Unknown	—	
95	May 1987	New Caledonia (A)	New Caledonia	0–2	Friendly		—	
96	14 May 1987	New Caledonia (A)	New Caledonia	0–0	Friendly		—	
97	9 December 1987	Nouméa (N)	Papua New Guinea	0–0	1987 South Pacific Games		—	
98	10 December 1987	Nouméa (N)	Wallis and Futuna	4–0	1987 South Pacific Games	Unknown	—	
99	12 December 1987	Nouméa (N)	New Caledonia	3–2	1987 South Pacific Games	Unknown	—	
100	15 December 1987	Nouméa (N)	Vanuatu	2–1	1987 South Pacific Games	Unknown	—	
–	17 December 1987	Nouméa (N)	American Samoa	–	1987 South Pacific Games		—	
101	19 December 1987	Nouméa (N)	New Caledonia	0–1	1987 South Pacific Games		—	
102	10 September 1991	Sir Ignatius Kilage Stadium, Lae (N)	Guam	15–0	1991 South Pacific Games	Thunot (5), R. Etaeta (4), others unknown	—	
103	12 September 1991	Sir Ignatius Kilage Stadium, Lae (N)	New Caledonia	2–2	1991 South Pacific Games	Unknown	—	
104	14 September 1991	Sir Ignatius Kilage Stadium, Lae (N)	Fiji	0–3	1991 South Pacific Games		—	
105	17 September 1991	Sir Ignatius Kilage Stadium, Lae (N)	Wallis and Futuna	5–0	1991 South Pacific Games	Unknown	—	
106	11 July 1992	Honiara (A)	Solomon Islands	1–1	1994 FIFA World Cup qualification	E. Etaeta	—	
107	12 July 1992	New Caledonia (A)	New Caledonia	1–0	Friendly	Unknown	—	
108	13 July 1992	Vanuatu (A)	Vanuatu	1–2	Friendly	Unknown	—	
109	20 July 1992	Vanuatu (A)	Vanuatu	2–1	Friendly	Unknown	—	
110	22 July 1992	New Caledonia (A)	New Caledonia	2–1	Friendly	Unknown	—	
111	11 September 1992	Papeete (H)	Australia	0–3	1994 FIFA World Cup qualification		—	
112	20 September 1992	Brisbane (A)	Australia	0–2	1994 FIFA World Cup qualification		—	
113	9 October 1992	Papeete (H)	Solomon Islands	4–2	1994 FIFA World Cup qualification	Temarii, Rousseau, Gatien (2)	—	
114	30 November 1993	French Polynesia (H)	Fiji	3–0	Friendly	Unknown	—	
115	7 December 1993	Port Vila (N)	Guam	11–0	1993 South Pacific Mini Games	Unknown	—	
116	9 December 1993	Port Vila (N)	Fiji	1–0	1993 South Pacific Mini Games	Unknown	—	
117	13 December 1993	Port Vila (N)	Solomon Islands	3–0	1993 South Pacific Mini Games	Unknown	—	
118	14 December 1993	Port Vila (N)	New Caledonia	2–1	1993 South Pacific Mini Games		—	
119	16 December 1993	Port Vila (N)	Fiji	3–0	1993 South Pacific Mini Games	Labaste, Jese (o.g.), Lei	—	
120	21 May 1994	Fiji (A)	Fiji	1–1	Friendly	Unknown	—	
121	23 May 1994	Fiji (A)	Fiji	2–2	Friendly	Unknown	—	
122	25 May 1994	Fiji (A)	Fiji	0–2	Friendly		—	
123	24 November 1994	Western Samoa (N)	Tonga	1–0	1994 Polynesia Cup	Unknown	—	
124	25 November 1994	Western Samoa (N)	American Samoa	2–1	1994 Polynesia Cup	Unknown	—	
125	28 November 1994	Western Samoa (N)	Western Samoa	7–0	1994 Polynesia Cup	Unknown	—	
126	24 March 1995	French Polynesia (H)	Fiji	3–3	Friendly	Unknown	—	
127	30 March 1995	French Polynesia (H)	Fiji	3–0	Friendly	Unknown	—	
128	9 June 1995	French Polynesia (H)	New Zealand	2–1	Friendly	Unknown	—	
129	17 August 1995	French Polynesia (N)	Wallis and Futuna	13–0	1995 South Pacific Games	Unknown	—	
130	19 August 1995	French Polynesia (N)	Solomon Islands	4–2	1995 South Pacific Games	Unknown	—	
131	21 August 1995	French Polynesia (N)	New Caledonia	2–0	1995 South Pacific Games	Unknown	—	
132	22 August 1995	French Polynesia (N)	Cook Islands	11–0	1995 South Pacific Games	Unknown	—	
133	24 August 1995	French Polynesia (N)	Vanuatu	3–0	1995 South Pacific Games	Unknown	—	
134	26 August 1995	French Polynesia (N)	Solomon Islands	2–0	1995 South Pacific Games	Unknown	—	
135	17 November 1995	Lawson Tama Stadium, Honiara (A)	Solomon Islands	1–0	1996 OFC Nations Cup	Rousseau	15,000	
136	11 May 1995	Stade Pater Te Hono Nui, Pirae (H)	Solomon Islands	2–1	1996 OFC Nations Cup	Rousseau, Gatien	15,000	
137	27 October 1996	Olympic Stadium, Papeete (H)	Australia	0–6	1996 OFC Nations Cup		5,000	
138	1 November 1996	Bruce Stadium, Canberra (A)	Australia	0–5	1996 OFC Nations Cup		9,421	
139	13 June 1997	Sydney (N)	Australia	0–5	1998 FIFA World Cup qualification		2,869	
140	15 June 1997	Sydney (N)	Solomon Islands	1–4	1998 FIFA World Cup qualification	Ludivion	253	
141	19 June 1997	Sydney (N)	Australia	0–2	1998 FIFA World Cup qualification		2,918	
142	21 June 1997	Sydney (N)	Solomon Islands	1–1	1998 FIFA World Cup qualification	Rousseau	—	
143	3 September 1998	Rarotonga (N)	Tonga	5–0	1998 Polynesia Cup	Unknown	—	
144	5 September 1998	Rarotonga (N)	Samoa	5–1	1998 Polynesia Cup	Unknown	—	
145	7 September 1998	Rarotonga (N)	American Samoa	12–0	1998 Polynesia Cup	Unknown	—	
146	8 September 1998	Rarotonga (N)	Cook Islands	5–0	1998 Polynesia Cup	Unknown	—	
147	25 September 1998	Lang Park, Brisbane (N)	New Zealand	0–1	1998 OFC Nations Cup		900	
148	30 September 1998	Lang Park, Brisbane (N)	Vanuatu	5–1	1998 OFC Nations Cup	Quennet (3), Zaveroni, Amaru	400	
149	2 October 1998	Lang Park, Brisbane (N)	Australia	1–4	1998 OFC Nations Cup	Labaste	1,200	
150	4 October 1998	Lang Park, Brisbane (N)	Fiji	2–4	1998 OFC Nations Cup	Rousseau (2)	2,000	

Notes

1. A: Tahiti forfeited the match as they were unable to field a team following injuries to 11 of their 19-man squad.
2. B: The Tahiti-American Samoa match at the 1987 South Pacific Games was not played. The result of the match would not have affected which teams would compete for the medals.
3. C: The 1994 Polynesia Cup doubled as qualifiers for the 1996 OFC Nations Cup.
4. D: The 1998 Polynesia Cup doubled as qualifiers for the 1998 OFC Nations Cup.

== Record by opponent ==
Team	Pld	W	D	L	GF	GA	GD	WPCT
American Samoa	2	2	0	0	14	1	+13	100.00
Australia	8	0	0	8	3	31	−28	0.00
Cook Islands	3	3	0	0	46	0	+46	100.00
Fiji	26	17	6	3	58	25	+33	65.38
Guam	2	2	0	0	26	0	+26	100.00
Mexico	1	0	0	1	0	1	−1	0.00
New Caledonia	45	18	8	19	64	76	−12	40.00
New Zealand	9	2	2	5	67	96	−29	22.22
Niue	1	1	0	0	14	0	+14	100.00
Papua New Guinea	9	7	2	0	24	11	+13	77.78
Samoa (Note: Includes results as Western Samoa.)	4	4	0	0	27	1	+26	100.00
Solomon Islands	13	10	2	1	59	13	+46	76.92
Tonga	3	3	0	0	14	0	+14	100.00
Tuvalu	1	1	0	0	18	0	+18	100.00
Vanuatu (Note: Includes results as New Hebrides.)	19	14	3	2	49	19	+30	73.68
Wallis and Futuna	4	4	0	0	27	0	+27	100.00
Total	150	88	23	39	510	274	+236	58.67

Source: Results
