= The Best FIFA Football Awards 2018 =

International football awards

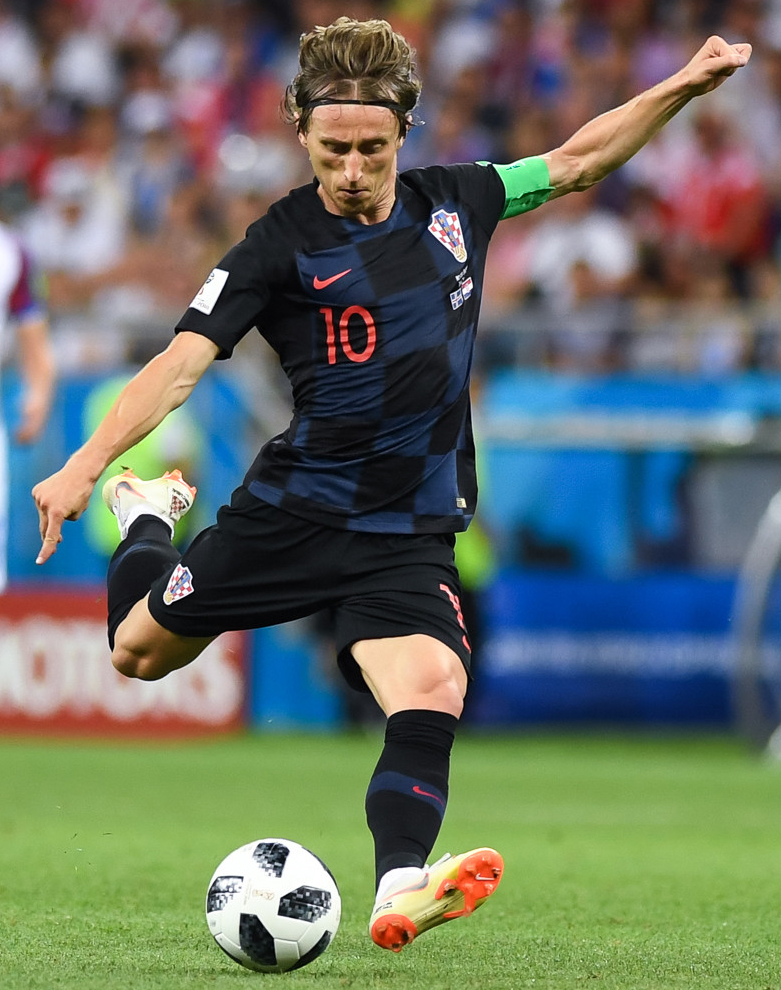
- Luka Modrić, The Best FIFA Men's Player 2018
- Date: 24 September 2018
- Location: Royal Festival Hall, London, United Kingdom
- Presented by: FIFA
- Hosted by: Idris Elba

Highlights
- The Best FIFA Player: Men's: (Croatia) Luka Modrić; Women's: (Brazil) Marta
- The Best FIFA Coach: Men's: (France) Didier Deschamps; Women's: (France) Reynald Pedros
- The Best FIFA Goalkeeper: (Belgium) Thibaut Courtois
- FIFA Puskás Award: (Egypt) Mohamed Salah
- Website: fifa.com

The Best FIFA Football Awards 2018 were held on 24 September 2018 in London, United Kingdom. The selection panels were announced on 4 July 2018.

== Winners and nominees ==
=== The Best FIFA Men's Player ===
Ten players were shortlisted on 24 July 2018. The 3 finalists were revealed on 3 September 2018.

Luka Modrić won the award with over 29% of the vote.

The selection criteria for the men's players of the year was: respective achievements during the period from 3 July 2017 to 15 July 2018.

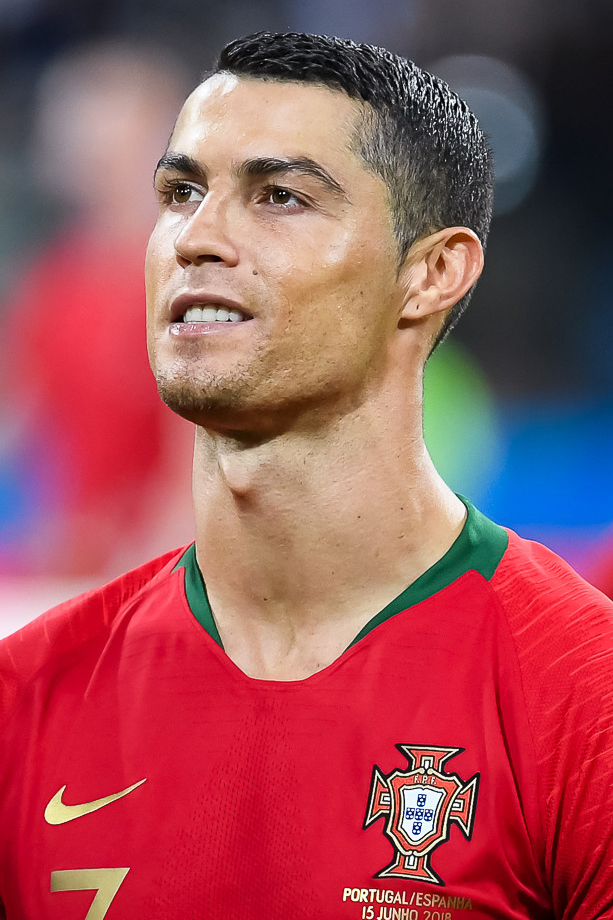
Cristiano Ronaldo

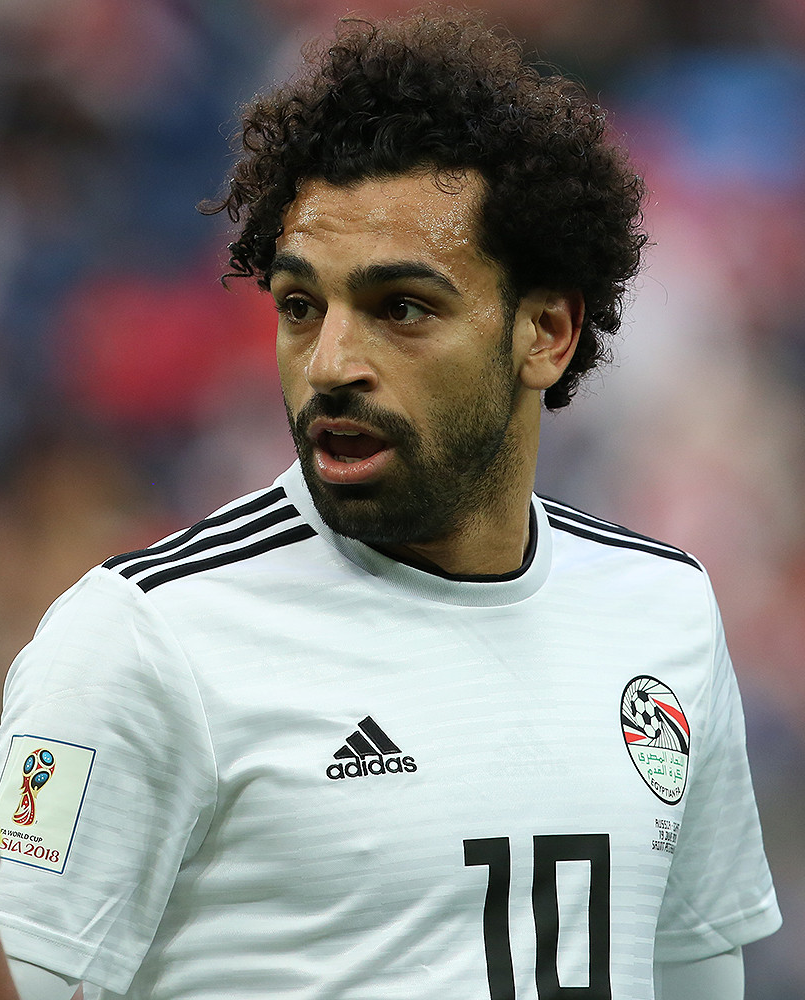
Mohamed Salah

Rank	Player	Club(s) played for	National team	Percent
The finalists
1	Luka Modrić	(Spain) Real Madrid	Croatia	29.05%
2	Cristiano Ronaldo	(Spain) Real Madrid; (Italy) Juventus	Portugal	19.08%
3	Mohamed Salah	(England) Liverpool	Egypt	11.23%
Other candidates
4	Kylian Mbappé	(France) Paris Saint-Germain	France	10.52%
5	Lionel Messi	(Spain) Barcelona	Argentina	9.81%
6	Antoine Griezmann	(Spain) Atlético Madrid	France	6.69%
7	Eden Hazard	(England) Chelsea	Belgium	5.65%
8	Kevin De Bruyne	(England) Manchester City	Belgium	3.54%
9	Raphaël Varane	(Spain) Real Madrid	France	3.45%
10	Harry Kane	(England) Tottenham Hotspur	England	0.98%

Selection panel

- (Saudi Arabia) Sami Al-Jaber
- (Nigeria) Emmanuel Amuneke
- (South Korea) Cha Bum-kun
- (Italy) Fabio Capello
- (Ivory Coast) Didier Drogba
- (Brazil) Kaká
- (England) Frank Lampard
- (Germany) Lothar Matthäus
- (Italy) Alessandro Nesta
- (Brazil) Carlos Alberto Parreira
- (Brazil) Ronaldo
- (Scotland) Andy Roxburgh
- (New Zealand) Wynton Rufer

=== The Best FIFA Goalkeeper ===
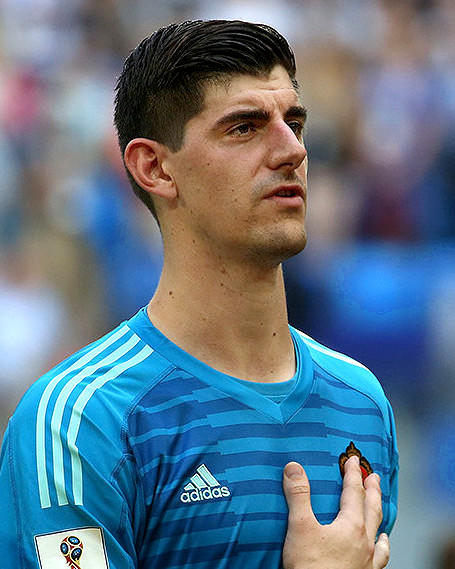
Thibaut Courtois

The three finalists were announced on 3 September 2018.

Rank	Player	Club(s) played for	National team	Percent
The finalists
1	Thibaut Courtois	(England) Chelsea	Belgium	—
—	Hugo Lloris	(England) Tottenham Hotspur	France	—
—	Kasper Schmeichel	(England) Leicester City	Denmark	—

Selection panel

- (Italy) Alessandro Altobelli
- (Portugal) Vítor Baía
- (England) Gordon Banks
- (Mexico) Jorge Campos
- (Russia) Rinat Dasaev
- (Uruguay) Diego Forlán
- (Colombia) René Higuita
- (Mali) Frédéric Kanouté
- (Denmark) Peter Schmeichel
- (Australia) Mark Schwarzer

=== The Best FIFA Men's Coach ===
Eleven coaches were initially shortlisted on 24 July 2018.

The three finalists were revealed on 3 September 2018.

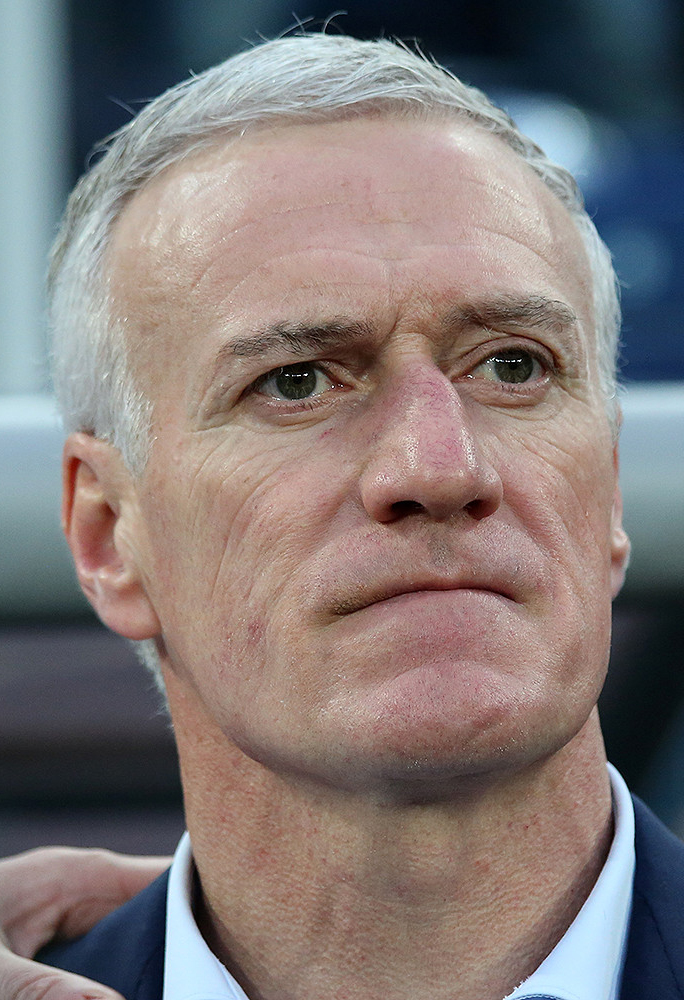
Didier Deschamps

Didier Deschamps won the award with over 30% of the votes.

Rank	Coach	Team(s) managed	Percent
The finalists
1	(France) Didier Deschamps	France	30.52%
2	(France) Zinedine Zidane	(Spain) Real Madrid	25.74%
3	(Croatia) Zlatko Dalić	Croatia	11.81%
Other candidates
4	(Spain) Pep Guardiola	(England) Manchester City	11.46%
5	(Germany) Jürgen Klopp	(England) Liverpool	7.18%
6	(Argentina) Diego Simeone	(Spain) Atlético Madrid	3.23%
7	(Spain) Roberto Martínez	Belgium	2.61%
8	(Spain) Ernesto Valverde	(Spain) Barcelona	2.39%
9	(Russia) Stanislav Cherchesov	Russia	2.14%
10	(England) Gareth Southgate	England	1.57%
11	(Italy) Massimiliano Allegri	(Italy) Juventus	1.35%

Selection panel

- (Saudi Arabia) Sami Al-Jaber
- (Nigeria) Emmanuel Amuneke
- (South Korea) Cha Bum-kun
- (Italy) Fabio Capello
- (Ivory Coast) Didier Drogba
- (Brazil) Kaká
- (England) Frank Lampard
- (Germany) Lothar Matthäus
- (Italy) Alessandro Nesta
- (Brazil) Carlos Alberto Parreira
- (Brazil) Ronaldo
- (Scotland) Andy Roxburgh
- (New Zealand) Wynton Rufer

=== The Best FIFA Women's Player ===
Ten players were shortlisted on 3 September 2018.

The three finalists were announced on 3 September 2018.

Marta won the award with nearly 15% of the vote.

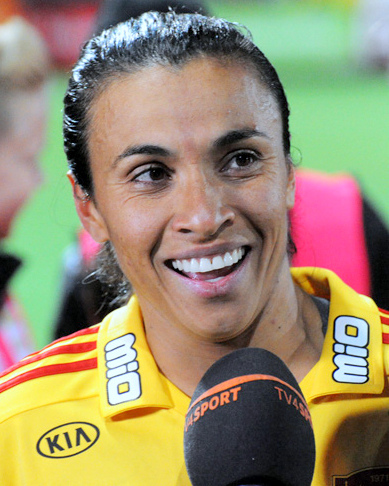
Marta

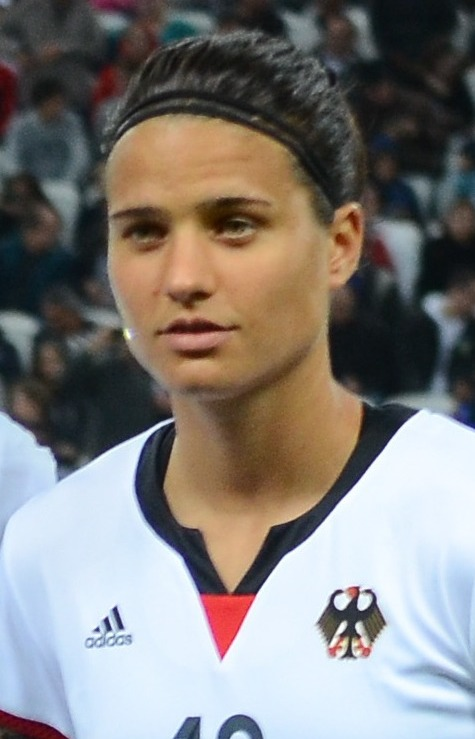
Dzsenifer Marozsán

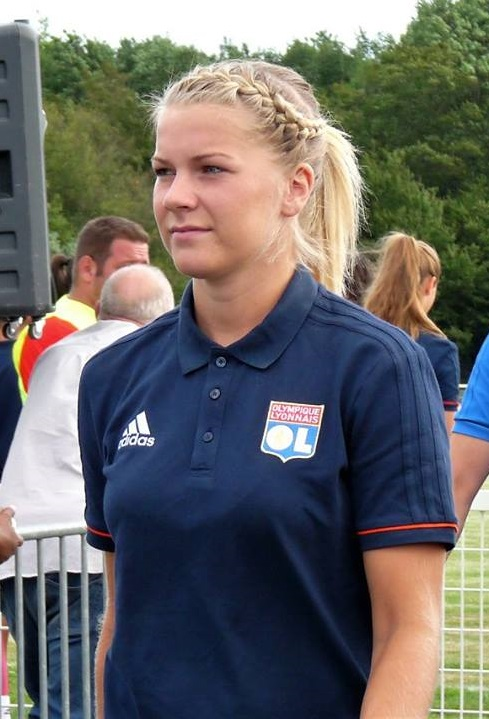
Ada Hegerberg

Rank	Player	Club(s) played for	National team	Percent
The finalists
1	Marta	(United States) Orlando Pride	Brazil	14.73%
2	Dzsenifer Marozsán	(France) Lyon	Germany	12.86%
3	Ada Hegerberg	(France) Lyon	Norway	12.60%
Other candidates
4	Megan Rapinoe	(United States) Seattle Reign	United States	11.64%
5	Pernille Harder	(Germany) VfL Wolfsburg	Denmark	10.08%
6	Lucy Bronze	(France) Lyon	England	8.65%
7	Amandine Henry	(France) Lyon	France	8.11%
8	Wendie Renard	(France) Lyon	France	7.89%
9	Sam Kerr	(Australia) Perth Glory; (United States) Sky Blue FC; (United States) Chicago Red Stars	Australia	6.78%
10	Saki Kumagai	(France) Lyon	Japan	6.66%

Selection panel

- (Argentina) Diego Guacci
- (United States) Mia Hamm
- (New Zealand) Maia Jackman
- (France) Patrick Jacquemet
- (Germany) Nadine Keßler
- (Mexico) Andrea Rodebaugh
- (Namibia) Jacqui Shipanga
- (Sweden) Anna Signeul
- (Brazil) Sissi
- (Ivory Coast) Clémentine Touré
- (China) Sun Wen
- (Australia) Belinda Wilson

=== The Best FIFA Women's Coach ===
Ten coaches were shortlisted.

The three finalists were announced on 3 September 2018.

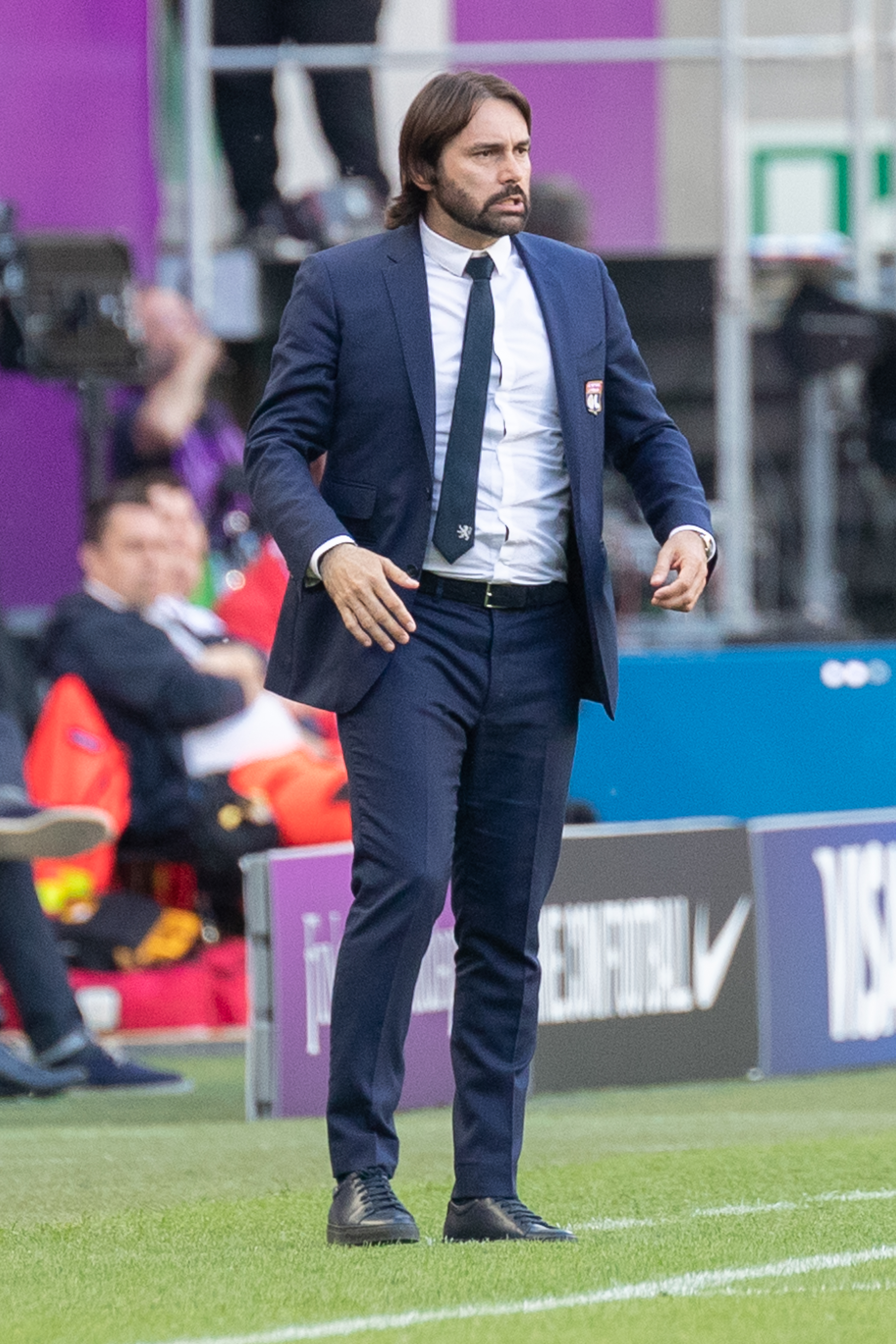
Reynald Pedros

Reynald Pedros won the award with over 23% of the vote.

Rank	Coach	Teams(s) managed	Percent
The finalists
1	(France) Reynald Pedros	(France) Lyon	23.15%
2	(Netherlands) Sarina Wiegman	Netherlands	15.31%
3	(Japan) Asako Takakura	Japan	12.80%
Other candidates
4	(England) Emma Hayes	(England) Chelsea	10.73%
5	(Germany) Stephan Lerch	(Germany) VfL Wolfsburg	9.21%
6	(Germany) Martina Voss-Tecklenburg	Switzerland	7.42%
7	(Brazil) Vadão	Brazil	6.66%
8	(Spain) Jorge Vilda	Spain	5.93%
9	(England) Mark Parsons	(United States) Portland Thorns FC	5.04%
10	(Australia) Alen Stajcic	Australia	3.75%

Selection panel

- (Argentina) Diego Guacci
- (United States) Mia Hamm
- (New Zealand) Maia Jackman
- (France) Patrick Jacquemet
- (Germany) Nadine Kessler
- (Mexico) Andrea Rodebaugh
- (Namibia) Jacqui Shipanga
- (Sweden) Anna Signeul
- (Brazil) Sissi
- (Ivory Coast) Clémentine Touré
- (China) Sun Wen
- (Australia) Belinda Wilson

=== FIFA Fair Play Award ===
Winner	Reason
(Germany) Lennart Thy	Missed an Eredivisie match to donate stem cells to a leukemia patient.

=== FIFA Puskás Award ===
Mohamed Salah won the award with 38% of the vote. Pablo Aimar, Iker Casillas, Miroslav Klose, Alex Scott, Aline Pellegrino, David Trezeguet and Marco van Basten formed the selection panel that named and announced the shortlist of nominees on 3 September 2018. Every registered FIFA.com user was allowed to participate in the final vote, with the questionnaire being presented on the official website of FIFA.

Rank	Player	Match	Competition	Date	Percent
The finalists
1	(Egypt) Mohamed Salah	Liverpool – Everton	2017–18 Premier League	10 December 2017	38%
2	(Portugal) Cristiano Ronaldo	Juventus – Real Madrid	2017–18 UEFA Champions League	3 April 2018	22%
3	(Uruguay) Giorgian de Arrascaeta	Cruzeiro – América Mineiro	2018 Campeonato Mineiro	4 February 2018	17%
Other candidates
	(Wales) Gareth Bale	Real Madrid – Liverpool	2017–18 UEFA Champions League	26 May 2018	23%
	(Russia) Denis Cheryshev	Russia – Croatia	2018 FIFA World Cup	7 July 2018	23%
	(Greece) Lazaros Christodoulopoulos	AEK Athens – Olympiacos	2017–18 Super League Greece	24 September 2017	23%
	(Australia) Riley McGree	Newcastle Jets – Melbourne City	2017–18 A-League	27 April 2018	23%
	(Argentina) Lionel Messi	Nigeria – Argentina	2018 FIFA World Cup	26 June 2018	23%
	(France) Benjamin Pavard	France – Argentina	2018 FIFA World Cup	30 June 2018	23%
	(Portugal) Ricardo Quaresma	Iran – Portugal	2018 FIFA World Cup	25 June 2018	23%

=== FIFA Fan Award ===
The award celebrates the best fan moment of September 2017 to July 2018, regardless of championship, gender or nationality.

The three nominees were announced on 3 September 2018.

Peru fans won the award with 74% of the vote.

Rank	Fan(s)	Match	Competition	Date	Percent
1	Peru fans	Various	2018 FIFA World Cup	June 2018	74%
2	Sebastián Carrera	Coquimbo Unido – Deportes Puerto Montt	2017 Primera B de Chile	22 October 2017	19%
3	Japan and Senegal fans	Various	2018 FIFA World Cup	June 2018	7%

Selection panel

- (Brazil) Cafu
- (France) Christian Karembeu
- (Serbia) Bora Milutinović
- (South Africa) Lucas Radebe
- (United States) Christie Rampone
- (Japan) Homare Sawa
- (United States) Lindsay Tarpley-Snow

=== FIFA FIFPRO World11 ===
The 55-player men's shortlist was announced on 10 September 2018.

The players chosen were David de Gea as goalkeeper, Dani Alves, Raphaël Varane, Sergio Ramos and Marcelo as defenders, Luka Modrić, N'Golo Kanté and Eden Hazard as midfielders, and Kylian Mbappé, Lionel Messi and Cristiano Ronaldo as forwards.

2018 FIFA FIFPRO World11

Player	Club(s)
Goalkeeper
(Spain) David de Gea	(England) Manchester United
Defenders
(Brazil) Dani Alves	(France) Paris Saint-Germain
(France) Raphaël Varane	(Spain) Real Madrid
(Spain) Sergio Ramos	(Spain) Real Madrid
(Brazil) Marcelo	(Spain) Real Madrid
Midfielders
(Croatia) Luka Modrić	(Spain) Real Madrid
(France) N'Golo Kanté	(England) Chelsea
(Belgium) Eden Hazard	(England) Chelsea
Forwards
(France) Kylian Mbappé	(France) Paris Saint-Germain
(Argentina) Lionel Messi	(Spain) Barcelona
(Portugal) Cristiano Ronaldo	(Spain) Real Madrid; (Italy) Juventus

Second Team

Player	Club(s)
Goalkeeper
(Belgium) Thibaut Courtois	(England) Chelsea; (Spain) Real Madrid
Defenders
(Spain) Dani Carvajal	(Spain) Real Madrid
(Brazil) Thiago Silva	(France) Paris Saint-Germain
(France) Samuel Umtiti	(Spain) Barcelona
(England) Kyle Walker	(England) Manchester City
Midfielders
(Belgium) Kevin De Bruyne	(England) Manchester City
(Germany) Toni Kroos	(Spain) Real Madrid
(France) Paul Pogba	(England) Manchester United
Forwards
(England) Harry Kane	(England) Tottenham Hotspur
(Brazil) Neymar	(France) Paris Saint-Germain
(Egypt) Mohamed Salah	(England) Liverpool

Third Team

Player	Club(s)
Goalkeeper
(Costa Rica) Keylor Navas	(Spain) Real Madrid
Defenders
(Spain) Jordi Alba	(Spain) Barcelona
(Uruguay) Diego Godín	(Spain) Atlético Madrid
(Germany) Joshua Kimmich	(Germany) Bayern Munich
(Spain) Gerard Piqué	(Spain) Barcelona
Midfielders
(Spain) Andrés Iniesta	(Spain) Barcelona; (Japan) Vissel Kobe
(Spain) Isco	(Spain) Real Madrid
(Croatia) Ivan Rakitić	(Spain) Barcelona
Forwards
(France) Antoine Griezmann	(Spain) Atlético Madrid
(Belgium) Romelu Lukaku	(England) Manchester United
(Uruguay) Luis Suárez	(Spain) Barcelona

Fourth Team

Player	Club(s)
Goalkeeper
(Italy) Gianluigi Buffon	(Italy) Juventus; (France) Paris Saint-Germain
Defenders
(Italy) Giorgio Chiellini	(Italy) Juventus
(Croatia) Dejan Lovren	(England) Liverpool
(France) Benjamin Pavard	(Germany) VfB Stuttgart
(England) Kieran Trippier	(England) Tottenham Hotspur
Midfielders
(Spain) Sergio Busquets	(Spain) Barcelona
(Brazil) Casemiro	(Spain) Real Madrid
(Brazil) Philippe Coutinho	(England) Liverpool; (Spain) Barcelona
Forwards
(Uruguay) Edinson Cavani	(France) Paris Saint-Germain
(Argentina) Paulo Dybala	(Italy) Juventus
(Senegal) Sadio Mané	(England) Liverpool

Fifth Team

Player	Club(s)
Goalkeeper
(Germany) Marc-André ter Stegen	(Spain) Barcelona
Defenders
(Germany) Mats Hummels	(Germany) Bayern Munich
(Colombia) Yerry Mina	(Spain) Barcelona; (England) Everton
(Netherlands) Virgil van Dijk	(England) Southampton; (England) Liverpool
(Croatia) Šime Vrsaljko	(Spain) Atlético Madrid; (Italy) Internazionale
Midfielders
(Serbia) Nemanja Matić	(England) Manchester United
(Spain) David Silva	(England) Manchester City
(Chile) Arturo Vidal	(Germany) Bayern Munich; (Spain) Barcelona
Forwards
(France) Karim Benzema	(Spain) Real Madrid
(Poland) Robert Lewandowski	(Germany) Bayern Munich
(Croatia) Mario Mandžukić	(Italy) Juventus
