= Football at the 1981 South Pacific Mini Games =

1981 South Pacific Mini Games
Tournament details
- Host country: Solomon Islands
- Dates: 7–15 July
- Teams: 7
- Venues: 2

Final positions
- Champions: Tahiti
- Runners-up: New Caledonia
- Third place: Papua New Guinea
- Fourth place: Vanuatu

Tournament statistics
- Matches played: 23
- Goals scored: 104 (4.52 per match)

Football was contested as part of the programme for the 1981 South Pacific Mini Games which was hosted in Honiara, Solomon Islands from 8 to 16 July 1981. It was the first edition of the men's football tournament at the multi-sport event organised by the Pacific Games Council.

The football tournament began with the first matches of the group stage on 7 July 1981 and ended with the gold medal match on 15 July 1981. Tahit and New Caledonia contested the final. Tahiti defeated New Caledonia 1–0 after extra time to win the gold medal. In the bronze medal match, Papua New Guinea defeated Vanuatu 1–0.

== Background ==
Football had been part of the South Pacific Games programme following the debut of the men's competition at the inaugural 1963 South Pacific Games in Fiji. The first edition of the South Pacific Mini Games was held in Honiara, Solomon Islands in 1981.

== Format ==
A total of seven teams took part in the competition. In the group stage, they would contest a single round-robin where each team would play every other team once. The group winners and runners-up would contest the gold medal match while third and fourth place would contest the bronze medal match.

=== Participants ===
- Fiji
- New Caledonia
- Papua New Guinea
- Solomon Islands
- Tahiti
- Vanuatu
- Western Samoa

== Group stage ==
Tahiti won all but one of their matches as they topped the group and advanced to the gold medal match. New Caledonia finished second – and advanced to the gold medal match – on goal difference ahead of Papua New Guinea, who would contest the bronze medal match. Hosts Vanuatu finished fourth – and advanced to the bronze medal match – on goal difference ahead of the Solomon Islands and Fiji.

=== Table ===
Pos	Team	Pld	W	D	L	GF	GA	GD	Pts	Qualification
1	Tahiti	6	5	1	0	30	2	+28	11	Gold medal match
2	New Caledonia	6	3	2	1	19	5	+14	8	Gold medal match
3	Papua New Guinea	6	4	0	2	13	16	−3	8	Bronze medal match
4	Vanuatu	6	1	3	2	20	10	+10	5	Bronze medal match
5	Solomon Islands	6	2	1	3	11	10	+1	5	
6	Fiji	6	2	1	3	9	14	−5	5	
7	Western Samoa	6	0	0	6	2	47	−45	0	

Rules for classification: 1) Points; 2) Goal difference; 3) Number of goals scored.

=== Matches ===
7 July 1981

Vanuatu	13–1	Western Samoa
Pretin Waoute (x7); Roger Waoute (x2); Amos Korikalo (x3); Simeon Roquara		Sofara Koro

Lawson Tama Stadium, Honiara
7 July 1981

Fiji	2–1	Solomon Islands
Wally Maseu 35'; Hirdesh Prasad 40'		Ben Sokeni 44'

Lawson Tama Stadium, Honiara
7 July 1981

Tahiti	1–0	New Caledonia
Kautai 36'

8 July 1981

Papua New Guinea	3–2	Fiji
Amos Semoso (x2); Daino Sami		Marika Ravula; Robert Simmons

SIPL, Honiara
8 July 1981

Vanuatu	2–2	New Caledonia
Pretin Waoute; Roger Waoute		Jean Drudri; Joseph Wamai

Lawson Tama Stadium, Honiara
8 July 1981

Tahiti	13–0	Western Samoa
Etienne Patia (x6); William Aumeran (x4); Kautai; Xavier Voirin; William Cadousteau

Lawson Tama Stadium, Honiara

9 July 1981

New Caledonia	1–1	Solomon Islands
Emilien Pa'ama 29'		Ben Sokeni 60'

SIPL, Honiara
9 July 1981

Papua New Guinea	4–1	Western Samoa
Popal Kanawi (x2); Timeang Mombi; Jasper Patterson		Peseta Tuia

Lawson Tama Stadium, Honiara
9 July 1981

Tahiti	1–1	Vanuatu
William Aumeran 42'		Pretin Waoute 56'

Lawson Tama Stadium, Honiara

10 July 1981

Vanuatu	1–1	Fiji
Seretangi Kalsakau 36'		Kinia Tubi 10'

SIPL, Honiara
10 July 1981

Solomon Islands	5–0	Western Samoa
Tom Ini 20', 24'; Eddie Kasute'e 27', 43', 65'

Lawson Tama Stadium, Honiara
10 July 1981

New Caledonia	5–1	Papua New Guinea
Valentin Coulon (x2); Sau Gure (o.g.)		Daino Sami

Lawson Tama Stadium, Honiara

11 July 1981

Fiji	4–0	Western Samoa
Robert Simmons 30'; George Dickson 32'; Tevita Rasasa 71'; David Chung 74'

Lawson Tama Stadium, Honiara
11 July 1981

Tahiti	5–0	Papua New Guinea
Kautai 18', 40'; Etienne Patia 78'; William Cadousteau 88'; William Aumeran 89'

Lawson Tama Stadium, Honiara
11 July 1981

Solomon Islands	2–1	Vanuatu
Ben Sokeni 4' (pen.); Silas Tiale 11'		Pretin Waoute 18'

Lawson Tama Stadium, Honiara

13 July 1981

Vanuatu	2–3	Papua New Guinea
Simeon Roquara 57'; Pretin Waoute 72' (pen.)		Daino Sami 10', 38', 44'

Lawson Tama Stadium, Honiara
13 July 1981

New Caledonia	3–0	Fiji
Emilien Pa'ama 10', 21', 50'

Lawson Tama Stadium, Honiara
13 July 1981

Tahiti	4–1	Solomon Islands
Gilles Malinowski 30', 54'; Yorrick To'omaru 37'; Robert Suri 54' (o.g.)		Mark Lae 58'

Lawson Tama Stadium, Honiara

14 July 1981

New Caledonia	8–0	Western Samoa
Aquetil Gowe 6', 10', 59'; Emilien Pa'ama 17', 53'; Emile Iopue 20'; Mathieu Kenon; Alfred Wabealo

Lawson Tama Stadium, Honiara
14 July 1981

Tahiti	6–0	Fiji
Lucas Damien 10', 62'; Etienne Patia 11', 24', 80'; Bennett 88' (pen.)

Lawson Tama Stadium, Honiara
14 July 1981

Solomon Islands	1–2	Papua New Guinea
Mark Lae 5'		Ricky Kondas 16'; Amos Semoso 60'

Lawson Tama Stadium, Honiara

== Bronze medal match ==
Daino Sami scored the only goal of the match as Papua New Guinea defeated Vanuatu to win the bronze medal.

15 July 1981

Papua New Guinea	1–0	Vanuatu
Daino Sami 70'

Lawson Tama Stadium, Honiara

== Gold medal match ==
Erroll Bennett scored the only goal of the match in extra time as Tahiti defeated New Caledonia to win the gold medal.

15 July 1981

Tahiti	1–0 (a.e.t.)	New Caledonia
Bennett 92'

Lawson Tama Stadium, Honiara
