= Naea Bennett =

French Polynesian politician (born 1977)

Minister of Youth, Crime Prevention and Sports
- In office 21 February 2022 – 15 May 2023
- President: Édouard Fritch
- Preceded by: Heremoana Maamaatuaiahutapu
- Succeeded by: Nahema Temarii

Personal details
- Born: 8 July 1977 (age 49) Tahiti
- Party: Tapura Huiraatira

Naea Bennett
Personal information
- Position: Striker

Senior career*
Years	Team	Apps	(Gls)
1995–2001	AS Vénus	?	(?)
2001–2014	AS Pirae	?	(91)

International career^{‡}
1996–2010	Tahiti	17	(12)

Managerial career
- 2018: Tahiti
- 2018–2022: AS Pirae
Medal record
Men's football
Representing Tahiti (as player)
OFC Nations Cup
Runner-up	1996 Oceania
Third place	2002 New Zealand
Men's Beach soccer
Representing Tahiti (as player)
FIFA Beach Soccer World Cup
Runner-up	2015 Portugal
Runner-up	2017 Bahamas
OFC Beach Soccer Nations Cup
Winner	2011 Tahiti
Men's Beach soccer
Representing Tahiti (as manager)
OFC Beach Soccer Nations Cup
Winner	2019 Tahiti
- * Club domestic league appearances and goals as of 21 October 2024 ‡ National team caps and goals as of 21 October 2024

Naea Tommy Irving Bennett (born 8 July 1977) is a French Polynesian former footballer, politician, and former Cabinet Minister. He last played as a striker for AS Pirae and also represented the Tahiti national beach soccer team. He is son of Erroll Bennett, a former Tahitian footballer who was runner-up at 1973 and 1980 OFC Nations Cup.

== Football career ==
In 2002, Naea Bennett took part in four qualifying matches for the World Cup with the Tahiti team. While playing for AS Pirae, Bennett joined the Tahiti beach soccer team, and competed in both the 2011 and 2015 World Cups. In all he took part in eight matches for as many wins as losses and five goals scored. In October 2013 he was appointed a knight of the Order of Tahiti Nui.

Bennett is a member of The Church of Jesus Christ of Latter-Day Saints and refuses to play football on Sundays. In 2015, he refused to play in the 2015 FIFA Beach Soccer World Cup final due to his religious beliefs.

In 2018 he was appointed interim head coach of the Tahiti national football team.

== Political career ==
In February 2022 he was appointed to the cabinet of Édouard Fritch as Minister of Youth, Crime Prevention and Sports.

== Career statistics ==
=== International ===
Appearances and goals by national team and year
National team	Year	Apps	Goals
Tahiti	1996	1	0
Tahiti	1997	–	
Tahiti	1998	–	
Tahiti	1999	–	
Tahiti	2000	1	0
Tahiti	2001	4	4
Tahiti	2002	3	0
Tahiti	2003	6	8
Tahiti	2004	–	
Tahiti	2005	–	
Tahiti	2006	–	
Tahiti	2007	–	
Tahiti	2008	–	
Tahiti	2009	–	
Tahiti	2010	2	0
Total		17	12

Scores and results list Tahiti's goal tally first, score column indicates score after each Bennett goal.

List of international goals scored by Naea Bennett
No.	Date	Venue	Opponent	Score	Result	Competition
1	4 June 2001	North Harbour Stadium, Albany, New Zealand	Vanuatu	2–0	6–1	2002 FIFA World Cup qualification
2	4 June 2001	North Harbour Stadium, Albany, New Zealand	Vanuatu	3–0	6–1	2002 FIFA World Cup qualification
3	4 June 2001	North Harbour Stadium, Albany, New Zealand	Vanuatu	5–1	6–1	2002 FIFA World Cup qualification
4	11 June 2001	North Harbour Stadium, Albany, New Zealand	Cook Islands	4–0	6–0	2002 FIFA World Cup qualification
5	30 June 2003	National Stadium, Suva, Fiji	Federated States of Micronesia	8–0	17–0	2003 South Pacific Games
6	30 June 2003	National Stadium, Suva, Fiji	Federated States of Micronesia	11–0	17–0	2003 South Pacific Games
7	30 June 2003	National Stadium, Suva, Fiji	Federated States of Micronesia	14–0	17–0	2003 South Pacific Games
8	30 June 2003	National Stadium, Suva, Fiji	Federated States of Micronesia	17–0	17–0	2003 South Pacific Games
9	3 July 2003	National Stadium, Suva, Fiji	Papua New Guinea	1–0	3–0	2003 South Pacific Games
10	3 July 2003	National Stadium, Suva, Fiji	Papua New Guinea	3–0	3–0	2003 South Pacific Games
11	7 July 2003	Churchill Park, Lautoka, Fiji	Tonga	3–0	4–0	2003 South Pacific Games
12	7 July 2003	Churchill Park, Lautoka, Fiji	Tonga	4–0	4–0	2003 South Pacific Games

== Honours ==
=== Player ===
Tahiti

- OFC Nations Cup: Runner-up, 1996; 3rd place, 2002
- FIFA Beach Soccer World Cup: Runner-up, 2015, 2017
- OFC Beach Soccer Nations Cup: 2011

=== Manager ===
Tahiti

- OFC Beach Soccer Nations Cup: 2019
