= Football at the 1993 South Pacific Mini Games =

1993 South Pacific Mini Games Football Tournament
Tournament details
- Host country: Vanuatu
- Dates: 7–16 December
- Teams: 8

Final positions
- Champions: Tahiti (2nd title)
- Runners-up: Fiji
- Third place: New Caledonia
- Fourth place: Vanuatu

Tournament statistics
- Matches played: 16
- Goals scored: 76 (4.75 per match)

Football was contested as part of the programme for the 1993 South Pacific Mini Games which was hosted in Port Vila, Vanuatu from 6 to 16 December 1993. It was the second edition of the men's football tournament at the multi-sport event organised by the Pacific Games Council.

The football tournament began with the first matches of the group stage on 7 December 1993 and ended with the gold medal match on 16 December 1993. Defending champions Tahiti and Fiji contested the final. Tahiti defeated Fiji 3–0 to win the gold medal. In the bronze medal match, New Caledonia defeated hosts Vanuatu 2–1.

== Background ==
Football had been part of the South Pacific Games programme following the debut of the men's competition at the inaugural 1963 South Pacific Games in Fiji. It was also included in the programme for the inaugural 1981 South Pacific Mini Games but was not included in either of 1985 or 1989.

Tahiti were the defending champions after defeating New Caledonia 1–0 after extra time in the gold medal match to win the inaugural and only previous edition, the 1981 South Pacific Mini Games in the Solomon Islands.

== Format ==
A total of eight teams took part in the competition. They were drawn into two single round robin groups of four teams. The group winners and runners-up would contest the semi-finals which would decide the teams contesting the gold and bronze medal matches.

=== Participants ===
- Fiji
- Guam
- New Caledonia
- Papua New Guinea
- Solomon Islands
- Tahiti
- Tonga
- Vanuatu

== Group stage ==
=== Group 1 ===
Vanuatu and New Caledonia advanced to the semi-finals.

==== Table ====
Pos	Team	Pld	W	D	L	GF	GA	GD	Pts	Qualification
1	Vanuatu	3	2	1	0	5	1	+4	7	Semi-finals
2	New Caledonia	3	1	2	0	13	2	+11	5	Semi-finals
3	Papua New Guinea	3	1	1	1	6	2	+4	4	
4	Tonga	3	0	0	3	0	19	−19	0	

Rules for classification: 1) Points; 2) Goal difference; 3) Number of goals scored.

==== Matches ====
7 December 1993

Vanuatu	3–0	Tonga

8 December 1993

New Caledonia	1–1	Papua New Guinea

10 December 1993

Tonga	0–5	Papua New Guinea

10 December 1993

Vanuatu	1–1	New Caledonia

13 December 1993

New Caledonia	11–0	Tonga

13 December 1993

Vanuatu	1–0	Papua New Guinea

=== Group 2 ===
Tahiti and Fiji advanced to the semi-finals.

==== Table ====
Pos	Team	Pld	W	D	L	GF	GA	GD	Pts	Qualification
1	Tahiti	3	3	0	0	15	0	+15	9	Semi-finals
2	Fiji	3	2	0	1	13	1	+12	6	Semi-finals
3	Solomon Islands	3	1	0	2	12	5	+7	3	
4	Guam	3	0	0	3	1	35	−34	0	

Rules for classification: 1) Points; 2) Goal difference; 3) Number of goals scored.

==== Matches ====
7 December 1993

Tahiti	11–0	Guam

7 December 1993

Fiji	1–0	Solomon Islands

9 December 1993

Tahiti	1–0	Fiji

11 December 1993

Solomon Islands	12–1	Guam

13 December 1993

Fiji	12–0	Guam

13 December 1993

Tahiti	3–0	Solomon Islands

== Semi-finals ==
Tahiti defeated New Caledonia 2–1 and Fiji defeated Vanuatu 2–0 to advance to the gold medal match.

14 December 1993

Tahiti	2–1	New Caledonia

14 December 1993

Vanuatu	0–2	Fiji

== Bronze medal match ==
New Caledonia defeated Vanuatu 2–1 to win the bronze medal.

16 December 1993

Vanuatu	1–2	New Caledonia

== Gold medal match ==
Goals from Hiro Labaste and Gong Lei helped Tahiti to a 3–0 win against Fiji as they won the gold medal.

16 December 1993

Tahiti	3–0	Fiji
Hiro Labaste 60'; Mosese Jese 70' (o.g.); Gong Lei 90'
