= Tahiti national football team =

Men's football team representing French Polynesia

Tahiti
- Nickname(s): Toa Aito (Les guerriers de fer; Iron Warriors)
- Association: Fédération Tahitienne de Football (FTF)
- Confederation: OFC (Oceania)
- Head coach: Joël Fréchet
- Captain: Teaonui Tehau
- Most caps: Teaonui Tehau (52)
- Top scorer: Teaonui Tehau (32)
- Home stadium: Stade Pater Te Hono Nui
- FIFA code: TAH
First colours	Second colours

FIFA ranking
- Current: 158 ▼1 (18 November 2026)
- Highest: 111 (August 2002)
- Lowest: 196 (April–May 2016)

First international
- French Polynesia 2–2 New Zealand (Papeete, Tahiti; 21 September 1952)

Biggest win
- Tahiti 30–0 Cook Islands (Papeete, Tahiti; 2 September 1971)

Biggest defeat
- New Zealand 10–0 Tahiti (Adelaide, Australia; 4 June 2004); Spain 10–0 Tahiti (Rio de Janeiro, Brazil; 20 June 2013)

OFC Nations Cup
- Appearances: 10 (first in 1973)
- Best result: Champions (2012)

Pacific Games
- Appearances: 16 (first in 1963)
- Best result: Champions (1966, 1975, 1979, 1983, 1995)

Confederations Cup
- Appearances: 1 (first in 2013)
- Best result: Group stage (2013)
Medal record
Men's football
OFC Nations Cup
Winner	2012 Solomon Islands
Runner-up	1973 New Zealand
Runner-up	1980 New Caledonia
Runner-up	1996 Oceania
Third place	2002 New Zealand
Third place	2024 Fiji/Vanuatu
Pacific Games
Gold medal – first place	1966 New Caledonia
Gold medal – first place	1975 Guam
Gold medal – first place	1979 Fiji
Gold medal – first place	1983 Western Samoa
Gold medal – first place	1995 Tahiti
Silver medal – second place	1969 Papua New Guinea
Silver medal – second place	1987 New Caledonia
Bronze medal – third place	1963 Fiji
Bronze medal – third place	1971 Tahiti
Bronze medal – third place	2011 New Caledonia
Pacific Mini Games
Gold medal – first place	1981 Solomon Islands
Gold medal – first place	1993 Vanuatu
Polynesia Cup
Winner	1994 Samoa
Winner	1998 Cook Islands
Winner	2000 Tahiti

The Tahiti national football team (French: Équipe de football de Tahiti; Tahitian: Te pŭpŭ tu'e popo a te fenua Tahiti) represents French Polynesia in men's international football, and is controlled by the Tahitian Football Federation. The team consists of a selection of players from French Polynesia, including Tahiti; they have competed in the Oceania Football Confederation (OFC) since 1990.

Tahiti is traditionally one of the stronger footballing nations of the Pacific Islands, with the second-best record at the Pacific Games, winning five gold medals. They were runners-up in the first three editions of the OFC Nations Cup (1973, 1980, 1996). Tahiti eventually won the competition in 2012, becoming the first team other than Australia and New Zealand to win the title. The feat qualified Tahiti to the 2013 FIFA Confederations Cup held in Brazil. It qualified for the 2009 FIFA U-20 World Cup in Egypt, becoming the first archipelago from Oceania to compete in a FIFA-sanctioned tournament, a feat it repeated in 2019 in Poland.

== History ==
Tahiti played its first full match on 21 September 1952, at home against New Zealand, drawing 2–2. Seven days later, the two teams played again and New Zealand won 5–3. On 30 September, they played each other for a third time, and Tahiti gained its first victory, by 2–0.

In September 1953, Tahiti played three matches in New Caledonia against its national side, losing the first 5–0 and the later two 4–1. They then travelled to the New Hebrides (now Vanuatu) and beat its national side 4–2 twice. In 1969, touring World Champions England beat Tahiti 4–1 in an exhibition match. In 1989, under the leadership of Napoleon Spitz, the official federation was created.

Tahiti entered its first World Cup qualification with the aim of reaching the 1994 World Cup, held in the United States. They were placed in Group A alongside Australia and the Solomon Islands, and played their first match away to the Solomon Islands in Honiara on 11 July 1992. Eric Etaeta equalised for Tahiti to make it 1–1 in the 76th minute. On 11 September, Tahiti hosted Australia in Papeete and lost 3–0. The next fixture was again against Australia, and resulted in a 2–0 away defeat in Brisbane on 20 September. On 9 October, in Papeete, Tahiti defeated the Solomon Islands 4–2. Tahiti's first goal was scored as an 8th-minute penalty from Reynald Temarii, a politician and current president of the OFC. However, Tahiti finished second to Australia in the group and did not advance.

=== 2012 OFC Nations Cup ===
In 2012, the new edition of the tournament occurred in the Solomon Islands with the host country, New Zealand, New Caledonia, Vanuatu, Tahiti, Fiji, Papua New Guinea and Samoa (winner of the qualifying tournament) playing the competition. Tahiti defeated New Caledonia in the final in Lawson Tama Stadium 1–0 with a goal by Steevy Chong Hue and became the first team other than Australia (no longer part of OFC) and New Zealand to be crowned Oceania champions.

=== 2013 Confederations Cup ===
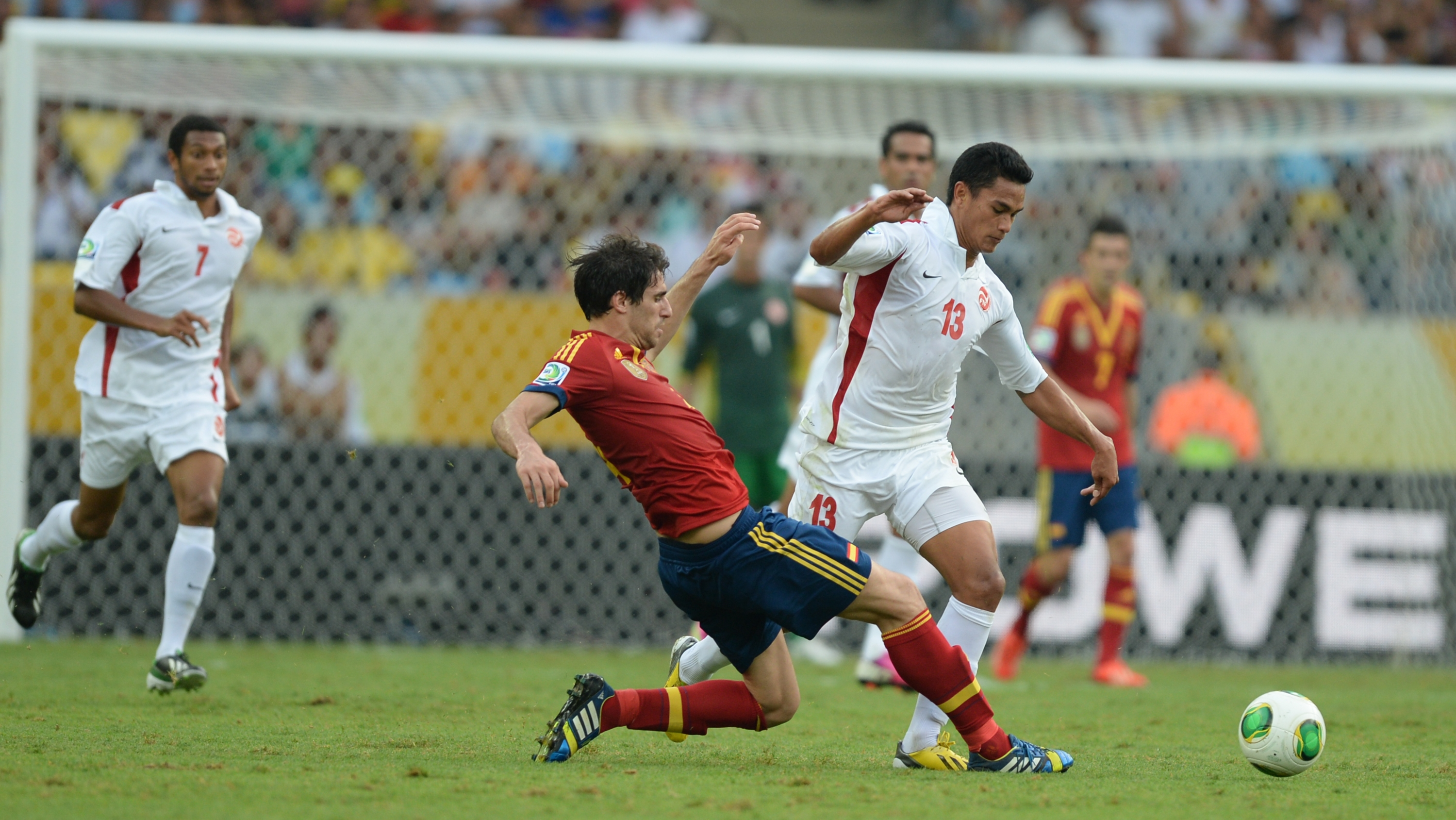
Tahiti players playing against 2010 FIFA World Cup champions Spain

By winning the 2012 OFC Nations Cup, Tahiti qualified for the 2013 Confederations Cup, held in Brazil, for the first time. On 17 June 2013, Tahiti lost 1–6 to Nigeria in the 2013 Confederations Cup in Belo Horizonte, with Jonathan Tehau scoring the goal for Tahiti in the second half with a header from a corner; Tahiti fans still rejoiced in the prospect of scoring a goal in an international tournament. On 20 June, Tahiti lost 10–0 against Spain to equal their largest ever lost against New Zealand nine years earlier. On 23 June 2013, Tahiti was beaten 8–0 by Uruguay.

In all, Tahiti conceded 24 goals and scored 1 to end with a goal differential of −23, the worst of any national team in any major competition. However, even with the poor record and heavy defeats, Tahiti's underdog qualities gathered significant respect from the people of Brazil, who always cheered for them in every match. Spanish coach Vicente del Bosque, and strikers Fernando Torres and David Villa – who scored four and three goals respectively against Tahiti – complimented the team's fair play.

== Rivalries ==
A historical sporting rivalry exists between the two French Pacific overseas collectivities, Tahiti and New Caledonia. They compete regularly in regional and, since 2006, international competitions. In 2012, Tahiti led the number of titles won (1 OFC Nations Cup, 5 gold medals at the South Pacific Games, 2 at the South Pacific mini-games, against 6 gold at the South Pacific Games for New Caledonia). As of their last match in 2018, out of the 62 matches played since 1953, the New Caledonia has 28 wins against 25 for Tahiti and 9 draws.

== Team image ==
=== Kit sponsorship ===
Kit supplier	Period
(Germany) Adidas	2000–2003
(Italy) Lotto	2004–2012
(United States) Nike	2013–2021
(Italy) Macron	2022–2023
(Germany) Puma	2024–present

== Results and fixtures ==
=== 2026 ===
September 26 Friendly	Cook Islands	1–3	Tahiti	Matavera, Cook Islands
18:00 UTC−10	Kerim Kumsuz 84'		Maitere Tanerii 6', 8' Honoura Maraetefau 62'	Stadium: CIFA Field

September 30 Friendly	Cook Islands	3–2	Tahiti	Matavera, Cook Islands
16:00 UTC−10	Mata 3', 49'; Rimene-Albrett 9'		K.Bennett 16', 23'	Stadium: CIFA Field

November 13 Friendly	Tahiti	4–0	Cook Islands	Faʼaʼā, Tahiti
18:00 (UTC-10:00)	Degrumelle 25', 53'; Beal 31' (o.g.); Tetauira 36'			Stadium: Stade Louis Ganivet

November 16 Friendly	Tahiti	3–3	Cook Islands	Faʼaʼā, Tahiti
18:00 (UTC-10:00)	Tetauira 25', 41'; T.Tehau 77'		Webb 19', 67'; Denny 87'	Stadium: Stade Louis Ganivet

== Coaching history ==
- (French Polynesia) Freddy Vernaudon (1973)
- (France) (Vietnam) Richard Van Sam (1980)
- (French Polynesia) François Ferez (1992)
- (French Polynesia) Bernard Vahirua (1992)
- (Italy) Umberto Mottini (1995–1996)
- (French Polynesia) Gerard Kautai (1996)
- (France) (Vietnam) Richard Van Sam (1997)
- (French Polynesia) Alain Rousseau (1998)
- (Australia) Leon Gardikiotis (1999–2000)
- (French Polynesia) Patrick Jacquemet (2001–2003)
- (French Polynesia) Gerard Kautai (2004–2007)
- (French Polynesia) Eddy Etaeta (2010–2015)
- (France) Ludovic Graugnard (2015–2018)
- (French Polynesia) Naea Bennett (2018–2019)
- (French Polynesia) Samuel Garcia (2019–2025)
- (France) Joël Fréchet (2026–present)

== Players ==
=== Current squad ===
The following players were called up for the Cook Islands matches in September 2026.

Caps and goals correct as of 21 March 2025, after the match against New Caledonia.

No.	Pos.	Player	Date of birth (age)	Caps	Goals	Club
	GK	Niuhau Firiapu	21 December 2007 (age 18)	0	0	(Tahitian Football Federation) Tahiti United
	GK	Titouan Courtois	14 March 2009 (age 17)	0	0	(Tahitian Football Federation) Pirae
	DF	Dylan Hutia	20 March 2006 (age 20)	0	0	(Tahitian Football Federation) Tefana
	DF	Iliwai Resopawiro		0	0	(Tahitian Football Federation) Tefana
	DF	Terai Bremond	16 May 2001 (age 25)	8	0	(Tahitian Football Federation) Tahiti United
	DF	Mauri Heitaa	31 July 1999 (age 27)	10	0	(Tahitian Football Federation) Tahiti United
	DF	Tauhiki Bohl	5 May 2008 (age 18)	0	0	(Cook Islands Football Association) Tupapa Maraerenga
	MF	Bryan Teaki Lebrun		0	0	(Tahitian Football Federation) Tefana
	MF	Roonui Tehau	15 December 1999 (age 26)	12	1	(Tahitian Football Federation) Tahiti United
	MF	Kavai'ei Morgant	8 October 2001 (age 25)	4	1	(Tahitian Football Federation) Tefana
	MF	Cedovan Taniel	21 November 2006 (age 20)	0	0	(Tahitian Football Federation) Tahiti United
	MF	Kamalani Bennett	25 December 2005 (age 20)	0	0	(French Football Federation) Haguenau
	MF	Honoura Maraetefau	27 July 2002 (age 24)	5	0	(Cook Islands Football Association) Tupapa Maraerenga
	MF	Yohann Tihoni	20 July 1994 (age 32)	4	0	(Tahitian Football Federation) Pirae
	FW	Hirinai Vahirua	24 February 2006 (age 20)	0	0	(Tahitian Football Federation) Tahiti United
	FW	Maitere Tanerii	14 April 2000 (age 26)	0	0	(Tahitian Football Federation) Central Sport
	FW	Albert Mairau		0	0	(Tahitian Football Federation) Mira
	FW	Matai Papaura	6 April 2005 (age 21)	14	0	(Tahitian Football Federation) Tahiti United
	FW	Teaonui Tehau (captain)	1 September 1992 (age 34)	49	31	(Tahitian Football Federation) Tahiti United

== Player records ==
As of 16 November 2026
Players in bold are still active with Tahiti.

=== Most appearances ===
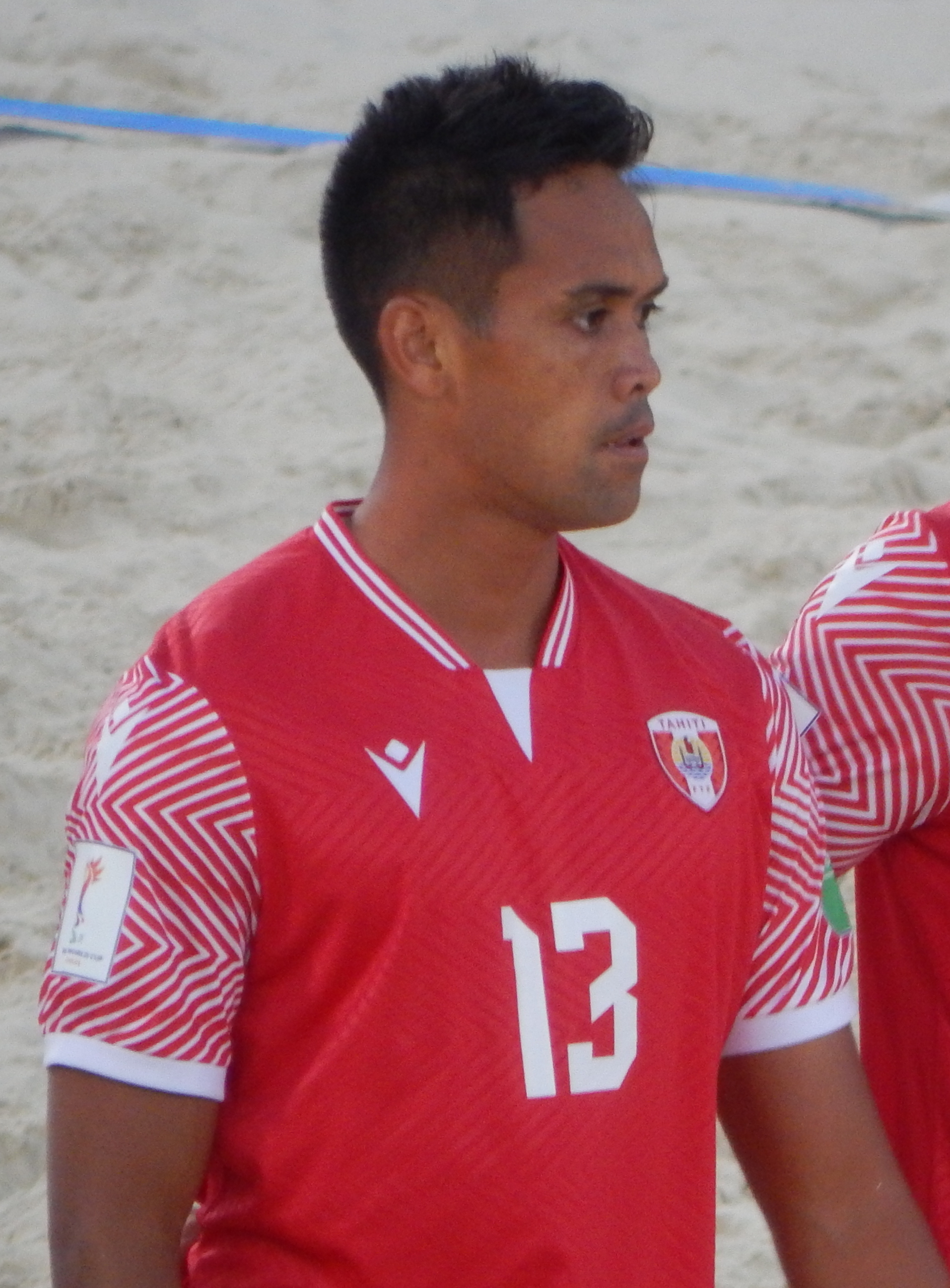
Teaonui Tehau is Tahiti's top goalscorer and their most-capped player.

Rank	Player	Caps	Goals	Career
1	**Teaonui Tehau**	52	32	2011–present
2	Erroll Bennett	46	15 (Note: It is possible that Bennett scored more than 15 goals for Tahiti because many of Tahiti's scorers from the 20th century are unknown.)	1973–1983
3	Angelo Tchen	34	1	2001–2018
4	Heimano Bourebare	30	1	2010–2023
4	Alvin Tehau	30	9	2010–2024
6	Steevy Chong Hue	28	8	2010–2016
6	Xavier Samin	28	0	2001–2013
8	Jonathan Tehau	26	5	2011–2017
9	Vincent Simon	25	1	2004–2016
10	Stanley Atani	24	6	2010–2019
10	Tetahio Auraa	24	1	1996–2008

=== Top goalscorers ===
Rank	Player	Goals	Caps	Ratio	Career
1	**Teaonui Tehau**	32	52	0.62	2011–present
2	Erroll Bennett	15	46	0.33	1973–1983
3	Felix Tagawa	14	23	0.61	2000–2004
4	Naea Bennett	12	16	0.75	1996–2010
5	Alvin Tehau	9	30	0.3	2010–2024
6	Steevy Chong Hue	8	28	0.29	2010–2016
7	Jean-Loup Rousseau	7	15	0.47	1992–2000
7	Lorenzo Tehau	7	20	0.35	2010–2017
9	Tauhiti Keck	6	19	0.32	2011–2025
9	Stanley Atani	6	24	0.25	2010–2019

== Competitive record ==
=== FIFA World Cup ===
FIFA World Cup record										Qualification record					
Year	Host	Result	Position	Pld	W	D	L	GF	GA	Pld	W	D	L	GF	GA
1930 to 1954		No national representative								No national representative					
1958 to 1990		Not a FIFA member								Not a FIFA member					
1994	United States	Did not qualify								4	1	1	2	5	8
1998	France	Did not qualify								4	0	1	3	2	12
2002	South Korea; Japan	Did not qualify								4	3	0	1	14	6
2006	Germany	Did not qualify								9	3	3	3	7	25
2010	South Africa	Did not qualify								4	1	1	2	2	6
2014	Brazil	Did not qualify								11	6	0	5	22	17
2018	Russia	Did not qualify								7	3	2	2	14	7
2022	Qatar	Did not qualify								2	0	0	2	1	4
2026	Canada; Mexico; United States	Did not qualify								4	2	0	2	5	6
2030	Morocco; Portugal; Spain	To be determined								To be determined					
2034	Saudi Arabia	To be determined								To be determined					
Total			0/9							49	19	8	22	72	91

=== OFC Nations Cup ===
Oceania Cup / OFC Nations Cup record										Qualification record					
Year	Result	Position	Pld	W	D	L	GF	GA	Squad	Pld	W	D	L	GF	GA
(New Zealand) 1973	Runners-up	2nd	5	2	2	1	7	4	Squad	No qualifiers were held					
(New Caledonia) 1980	Runners-up	2nd	4	3	0	1	23	9	Squad	No qualifiers were held					
(Pacific Community) 1996	Runners-up	2nd	4	2	0	2	3	12	Squad	3	3	0	0	10	1
(Australia) 1998	Fourth place	4th	4	1	0	3	8	10	Squad	4	4	0	0	27	1
(French Polynesia) 2000	Group stage	5th	2	0	0	2	2	5	Squad	4	4	0	0	30	2
(New Zealand) 2002	Third place	3rd	5	3	0	2	8	9	Squad	Directly qualified					
(Australia) 2004	Group stage	5th	5	1	1	3	2	24	Squad	4	2	2	0	5	1
(Pacific Community) 2008	Did not qualify									4	1	1	2	2	6
(Solomon Islands) 2012	Champions	1st	5	5	0	0	20	5	Squad	Directly qualified					
(Papua New Guinea) 2016	Group stage	5th	3	1	2	0	7	3	Squad	Directly qualified					
(Fiji) (Vanuatu) 2024	Third place	3rd	5	2	1	2	5	8	Squad	Directly qualified					
Total	1 Title	10/11	42	20	6	16	85	89	—	19	14	3	2	74	11

=== FIFA Confederations Cup ===
FIFA Confederations Cup record
Year	Result	Position	Pld	W	D	L	GF	GA	Squad
1992 to 1995	No OFC representative invited								
1997 to 2009	Did not qualify								
(Brazil) 2013	Group stage	8th	3	0	0	3	1	24	Squad
(Russia) 2017	Did not qualify								
Total	Group stage	1/10	3	0	0	3	1	24	—

=== Polynesia Cup ===
Polynesia Cup record
Year	Result	Position	Pld	W	D*	L	GF	GA
(Samoa) 1994	Champions	1st	3	3	0	0	10	1
(Cook Islands) 1998	Champions	1st	4	4	0	0	27	1
(French Polynesia) 2000	Champions	1st	4	4	0	0	30	2
Total	3 Titles	3/3	11	11	0	0	67	4

=== Pacific Games ===
Pacific Games record
Year	Result	Position	Pld	W	D*	L	GF	GA
(Fiji) 1963	Bronze medal	3rd	2	1	0	1	19	2
(New Caledonia) 1966	Gold medal	1st	4	4	0	0	14	3
(Papua New Guinea) 1969	Silver medal	2nd	5	3	1	1	19	7
(French Polynesia) 1971	Bronze medal	3rd	4	2	1	1	41	5
(Guam) 1975	Gold medal	1st	5	4	0	1	12	6
(Fiji) 1979	Gold medal	1st	5	5	0	0	33	2
(Samoa) 1983	Gold medal	1st	5	5	0	0	25	2
(New Caledonia) 1987	Silver medal	2nd	5	3	1	1	9	4
(Papua New Guinea) 1991	Group stage	6th	3	1	0	2	15	5
(French Polynesia) 1995	Gold medal	1st	6	6	0	0	35	2
(Fiji) 2003	Fourth place	4th	6	3	0	3	25	7
(Samoa) 2007	Group stage	6th	4	1	1	2	2	6
(New Caledonia) 2011	Bronze medal	3rd	6	3	1	2	28	9
(Papua New Guinea) 2015	Silver medal	2nd	5	3	1	1	34	4
(Samoa) 2019	Group stage	5th	5	3	0	2	19	6
(Solomon Islands) 2023	Group stage	5th	4	3	1	0	9	1
Total	5 Gold medals	16/16	74	50	7	17	339	71

== Honours ==
=== Continental ===
- OFC Nations Cup
  - (gold) Champions (1): 2012
  - (silver) Runners-up (3): 1973, 1980, 1996
  - (bronze) Third place (2): 2002, 2024

=== Subcontinental ===
- Pacific Games
  - (gold) Gold medals (5): 1966, 1975, 1979, 1983, 1995
  - (silver) Silver medals (2): 1969, 1987
  - (bronze) Bronze medals (3): 1963, 1971, 2011
- Pacific Mini Games
  - (gold) Gold medal (2): 1981, 1993
- Polynesia Cup
  - (gold) Champions (3): 1994, 1998, 2000

=== Summary ===
Including honours in competitions directly organized/recognized by FIFA or an affiliated confederation.

Competition	1st place, gold medalist(s)	2nd place, silver medalist(s)	3rd place, bronze medalist(s)	Total
OFC Nations Cup	1	3	2	6
Total	1	3	2	6
