= Patrick Jacquemet =

Tahitian footballer and manager (born 1965)

Personal information
- Date of birth: 10 November 1965 (age 61)
- Place of birth: Lyon, France
- Height: 1.87 m (6 ft 2 in)
- Position: Goalkeeper

Senior career*
Years	Team	Apps	(Gls)
1984–1988	ASOA Valence		
1988–1990	FC Valence		
1990–1992	ASOA Valence		
1992–1999	A.S. Vénus		

International career
1998	Tahiti	2	(0)

Managerial career
- 1999–2000: A.S. Vénus
- 2001–2003: Tahiti
Medal record
Men's football
Representing Tahiti (as manager)
OFC Nations Cup
Bronze medal – third place	2002
- * Club domestic league appearances and goals

Patrick Jacquemet (born 10 November 1965) is a French professional football manager and former player. He currently serves as the Chief of the Football department for the Oceania Football Confederation (OFC).

== Career ==
He began his career for FC Valence.

In 1999–2000 he coached the A.S. Vénus. Since June 2001 until August 2003 he was a head coach of the Tahiti national football team.
