= Erroll Bennett =

Tahitian footballer (1950–2025)

Personal information
- Date of birth: 7 May 1950
- Place of birth: Papeete, Tahiti, French Polynesia
- Date of death: 2 June 2025 (aged 75)
- Position: Forward

Youth career
- 1963–1966: A.S. Central Sport

Senior career*
Years	Team	Apps	(Gls)
1966–1972	A.S. Central Sport		
1972	Paris Saint-Germain	0	(0)
1972	Paris Saint-Germain Reserves		
1972–1983	A.S. Central Sport		

International career
1973–1983	Tahiti	46	(15+ (Note: It is possible that Bennett scored more than 15 goals for Tahiti because many of Tahiti's scorers from the 20th century are unknown.))
- * Club domestic league appearances and goals

Erroll Bennett (7 May 1950 – 2 June 2025) was a Tahitian footballer, who spent his career with A.S. Central Sport and Paris Saint-Germain. He placed fifteenth in a 1999 poll by International Federation of Football History & Statistics to find the Player of the Century for Oceania.

== Club career ==
=== 1963–1983: A.S. Central Sport ===
Joining the youth team in 1963 and playing for the senior team between 1966 and 1983, Bennett spent most of his career with A.S. Central Sport aside from a short stint with Paris Saint-Germain's reserve team.

Over 17 years, he won fourteen Tahiti Ligue 1 titles and eight Tahiti Cups with the club.

=== 1972: Short stint with Paris Saint-Germain ===
During his time with Paris Saint-Germain, he played for the club during their first season ever in Ligue 1 (1971–72).

He mainly played for the reserve team between January and June 1972, and he planned to stay with the club but financial troubles forced him to leave PSG as the club was relegated to Division 3, although Henri Patrelle (the then president of PSG) failed to convince Bennett to stay at PSG.

After leaving PSG, Bennett was subsequently in contact with AS Saint-Etienne but he instead rejoined A.S. Central Sport in July 1972.

== International career ==
Bennett was part of the Tahitian national squad for the 1973 Oceania Cup, the first ever Oceania-wide international soccer tournament. Bennett scored three goals in the tournament, and played in the final, which Tahiti lost 2–0 to New Zealand.

He also won the South Pacific Games tournament three times with Tahiti.

== Personal life and death ==
Bennett joined the Church of Jesus Christ of Latter-day Saints (LDS Church) in 1977 after which he refused to play football on Sundays. Following Bennett's baptism, Napoléon Spitz, the head of Bennett's team, held a meeting in which he said his team would stop Sunday play and all football teams in that division agreed to move games to weeknights.

Bennett was also a police officer in Tahiti. He was the father of Naea Bennett, who also played for the Tahiti national team.

Bennett died on 2 June 2025, at the age of 75.

== Career statistics ==
Appearances and goals by national team and year
National team	Year	Apps	Goals
Tahiti	1973	5	3
Tahiti	1974	3	0
Tahiti	1975	5	0
Tahiti	1978	3	0
Tahiti	1979	5	7
Tahiti	1980	9	2
Tahiti	1981	9	3
Tahiti	1983	5	0
Total		46	15

Tahiti score listed first, score column indicates score after each Bennett goal

List of international goals scored by Erroll Bennett
No.	Date	Venue	Opponent	Score	Result	Competition
1	17 February 1973	Newmarket Park, Auckland, New Zealand	New Caledonia	1–?	2–1	1973 Oceania Cup
2	18 February 1973	Newmarket Park, Auckland, New Zealand	New Zealand	1–?	1–1	1973 Oceania Cup
3	21 February 1973	Newmarket Park, Auckland, New Zealand	New Hebrides	1–0	1–0	1973 Oceania Cup
4	29 August 1979	Buckhurst Park, Suva, Fiji	Tonga	?–0	8–0	1979 South Pacific Games
5	29 August 1979	Buckhurst Park, Suva, Fiji	Tonga	?–0	8–0	1979 South Pacific Games
6	29 August 1979	Buckhurst Park, Suva, Fiji	Tonga	?–0	8–0	1979 South Pacific Games
7	3 September 1979	Buckhurst Park, Suva, Fiji	New Hebrides	1–0	1–0	1979 South Pacific Games
8	4 September 1979	Buckhurst Park, Suva, Fiji	New Caledonia	?–2	3–2	1979 South Pacific Games
9	4 September 1979	Buckhurst Park, Suva, Fiji	New Caledonia	?–2	3–2	1979 South Pacific Games
10	7 September 1979	Buckhurst Park, Suva, Fiji	Fiji	2–0	3–0	1979 South Pacific Games
11	7 September 1979	Buckhurst Park, Suva, Fiji	Fiji	3–0	3–0	1979 South Pacific Games
12	25 February 1980	Stade Numa-Daly Magenta, Nouméa, New Caledonia	New Zealand	3–1	3–1	1980 Oceania Cup
13	1 March 1980	Stade Numa-Daly Magenta, Nouméa, New Caledonia	Australia	2–?	2–4	1980 Oceania Cup
14	14 July 1981	Lawson Tama Stadium, Honiara, Solomon Islands	Fiji	1–0	1–0	1981 South Pacific Mini Games
15	15 July 1981	Lawson Tama Stadium, Honiara, Solomon Islands	New Caledonia	?–0	6–0	1981 South Pacific Mini Games

== Honours ==
A.S. Central Sport

- Tahiti Ligue 1 (14): 1963, 1964, 1965, 1966, 1967, 1973, 1974, 1975, 1976, 1977, 1978, 1979, 1981, 1982
- Tahiti Cup (9): 1966, 1967, 1973, 1975, 1976, 1977, 1979, 1981, 1983

Tahiti

- Oceania Cup runner-up: 1973, 1980
- South Pacific Games: 1975, 1979, 1983
