= Jacqui Shipanga =

Namibian national women's soccer coach

Jacqueline Shipanga is a Namibian national women's soccer coach. She is the head coach of the three national women's soccer teams: the Under 17, Under 20, and the Brave Gladiators. She is also the founder of the Jacqui Shipanga Academy, which won the NFA Women Super's League for the first time in the 2011/2012 season, defeating the Okahandja Beauties.
