= Football at the 1979 South Pacific Games =

Tournament details
- Host country: Fiji
- Dates: 29 August – 7 September
- Teams: 12 (from 1 confederation)
- Venue: (in Suva host cities)

Final positions
- Champions: Tahiti (3rd title)
- Runners-up: Fiji
- Third place: Solomon Islands

Tournament statistics
- Matches played: 20
- Goals scored: 148 (7.4 per match)

Football was contested as part of the programme for the 1979 South Pacific Games which was hosted in Suva, Fiji from 28 August to 8 September 1979. It was the sixth edition of the men's football tournament at the multi-sport event organised by the Pacific Games Council.

The football tournament began with the first matches of the group stage on 29 August 1979 and ended with the gold medal match on 7 September 1979. Hosts Fiji and defending champions Tahiti contested the final. Tahiti defeated Fiji 3–0 to win the gold medal. In the bronze medal match, the Solomon Islands defeated New Caledonia 3–1.

== Background ==
Football had been part of the South Pacific Games programme following the debut of the men's competition at the inaugural 1963 South Pacific Games in Fiji.

New Caledonia held the record for gold medals having won the football tournament three times. Tahiti were the defending champions after defeating New Caledonia 2–1 after extra time in the gold medal match at the 1975 South Pacific Games in Guam.

Neither Kiribati nor Tuvalu had fielded a football team before.

== Format ==
A total of 12 teams took part in the competition. They were drawn into four single round robin groups of three teams. The group winners and runners-up would contest the quarter-finals The winners of the quarter-finals would contest the semi-finals which would decide the teams contesting the gold and bronze medal matches. A consolation tournament was held for the teams finishing third in the group stage and the losing quarter-finalists.

=== Participants ===
- Fiji (host)
- Guam
- Kiribati
- (France) New Caledonia
- New Hebrides
- Papua New Guinea
- Solomon Islands
- Tahiti
- Tonga
- Tuvalu
- Wallis and Futuna
- Western Samoa

== Group stage ==
=== Group 1 ===
Fiji won the group to progress to the quarter-finals alongside Papua New Guinea.

Team	Pts	Pld	W	D	L	GF	GA	GD
Fiji	3	2	1	1	0	24	0	+24
Papua New Guinea	3	2	1	1	0	13	0	+13
Kiribati	0	2	0	0	2	0	37	–37

29 August 1979

Papua New Guinea	0–0	Fiji

Fiji

30 August 1979

Fiji	24–0	Kiribati
Chand 8'; Janeman 7'; Salim 3'; Tubuna 2'; Waqa 2'; Vuilabasa; Khan

Fiji

31 August 1979

Papua New Guinea	13–0	Kiribati

Fiji

=== Group 2 ===
Tahiti won the group to progress to the quarter-finals alongside Tuvalu.

Team	Pts	Pld	W	D	L	GF	GA	GD
Tahiti	4	2	2	0	0	26	0	+26
Tuvalu	2	2	1	0	1	5	21	–16
Tonga	0	2	0	0	2	3	13	–10

29 August 1979

Tahiti	8–0	Tonga
Errol Bennett 3'; William Aumeran 2'; Gérard Kautai; Gilles Malinowski 2'

Fiji

30 August 1979

Tahiti	18–0	Tuvalu

Fiji

1 September 1979

Tuvalu	5–3	Tonga
Tealofi 5'

Fiji

=== Group 3 ===
The Solomon Islands won the group to progress to the quarter-finals alongside Wallis and Futuna.

Team	Pts	Pld	W	D	L	GF	GA	GD
Solomon Islands	4	2	2	0	0	18	0	+18
Wallis and Futuna	2	2	1	0	1	3	7	–4
Western Samoa	0	2	0	0	2	1	15	–14

29 August 1979

Solomon Islands	12–0	Western Samoa

Fiji

31 August 1979

Solomon Islands	6–0	Wallis and Futuna
Wilson Maelaua 3'; Luito'o Fa'arodo; Henry Suri; James Sulimae

Fiji

1 September 1979

Wallis and Futuna	3–1	Western Samoa

Fiji

=== Group 4 ===
New Caledonia won the group to progress to the quarter-finals alongside the New Hebrides.

Team	Pts	Pld	W	D	L	GF	GA	GD
New Caledonia	4	2	2	0	0	14	1	+13
New Hebrides	2	2	1	0	1	4	3	+1
Guam	0	2	0	0	2	1	15	–14

29 August 1979

New Caledonia	11–1	Guam

Fiji

30 August 1979

New Caledonia	3–0	New Hebrides
Segin Wayewol 2'; Pierre Wacapo

Fiji

31 August 1979

New Hebrides	4–0	Guam
Toto Nafu 2' unknown (o.g.); Michael Naugar

Fiji

== Quarter-finals ==
Fiji defeated Wallis and Futuna, Tahiti defeated the New Hebrides, the Solomon Islands defeated Papua New Guinea and New Caledonia defeated Tuvalu in the quarter-finals.

3 September 1979

Fiji	5–0	Wallis and Futuna
Farouk Janeman 2'; Josaia Tubuna; Mohammed Salim; Feroz Khan

Fiji

3 September 1979

Tahiti	1–0	New Hebrides
Errol Bennett

Fiji

3 September 1979

Solomon Islands	3–2	Papua New Guinea
Henry Suri 50', 73'; Alick Bebeu 55'		Hatsire Manhi 25'; Daino Sami 44'

Fiji

3 September 1979

New Caledonia	11–0	Tuvalu
Jean Xowie 5'; Dera Suihuliwa 4'; Hilaire Kenon; Fouidja

Fiji

== Semi-finals ==
Fiji defeated the Solomon Islands and Tahiti defeated New Caledonia in the semi-finals.

4 September 1979

Fiji	2–0	Solomon Islands
Dewan Chand 95', 115'

Fiji

4 September 1979

Tahiti	3–2	New Caledonia
Errol Bennett 2'; Gilles Malinowski

Fiji

== Bronze medal match ==
The Solomon Islands defeated New Caledonia to win the bronze medal.

7 September 1979

New Caledonia	1–3	Solomon Islands
Bernard Ukeiwe		Wilson Maelaua 2'; Davidson Ngawaeramo

Fiji

== Gold medal match ==
Tahiti defeated Fiji to win the gold medal.

7 September 1979

Fiji	0–3	Tahiti
		Gérard Kautai 53'; Errol Bennett 66', 72'

Buckhurst Park, Fiji
Attendance: 22,000

== Consolation tournament ==
=== Quarter-finals ===
Guam defeated Western Samoa, the New Hebrides defeated Papua New Guinea, Tonga defeated Wallis and Futuna and Tuvalu defeated Kiribati in the quarter-finals.

5 September 1979

Guam	4–2	Western Samoa

Fiji

5 September 1979

New Hedrides (New Hebrides)	2–0	Papua New Guinea

Fiji

5 September 1979

Tonga	1–0	Wallis and Futuna

Fiji

5 September 1979

Tuvalu	3–3	Kiribati
Penalties
	4–2

Fiji

=== Semi-finals ===
Guam defeated Tuvalu and the New Hebrides defeated Tonga in the semi-finals.

6 September 1979

Guam	7–2	Tuvalu

Fiji

6 September 1979

New Hebrides	7–1	Tonga

Fiji

=== Fifth-place match ===
Despite being scheduled, it is believed that the fifth-place match never took place.

7 September 1979

New Hebrides	v	Guam

Fiji

== Goalscorers ==
There were 148 goals scored in 20 matches, for an average of 7.4 goals per match.

10 goals

- (Fiji) Dewan Chand

9 goals

- (Fiji) Farouk Janeman

6 goals

- (French Polynesia) Errol Bennett

5 goals

- (New Caledonia) Jean Xowie
- (Solomon Islands) Wilson Maelaua
- (Tuvalu) Saifoloi Metia Tealofi

4 goals

- (Fiji) Mohammed Salim
- (New Caledonia) Dera Suihuliwa
