= 1980 Oceania Cup =

Coupe d'Océanie des nations 1980 1980 OFC Aibu te Fenua

Tournament details
- Host country: New Caledonia
- Dates: 24 February – 1 March
- Teams: 8 (from 1 confederation)
- Venue: 1 (in 1 host city)

Final positions
- Champions: Australia (1st title)
- Runners-up: Tahiti
- Third place: New Caledonia
- Fourth place: Fiji

Tournament statistics
- Matches played: 14
- Goals scored: 94 (6.71 per match)
- Top scorer(s): (Australia) Ian Hunter (Australia) Eddie Krncevic (5 goals each)

The 1980 OFC Nations Cup was held in Nouméa, New Caledonia. The eight participating teams were Australia, Fiji, New Caledonia, New Hebrides, New Zealand, Papua New Guinea, the Solomon Islands, and Tahiti. Australia defeated Tahiti 4-2 in the final to secure a championship title which would last for 16 years. The hosts, New Caledonia, defeated Fiji to finish third.

== Venues ==
New Caledonia
Nouméa	1980 Oceania Cup is located in New Caledonia
Stade de Magenta	1980 Oceania Cup is located in New Caledonia
Capacity: 10,000	1980 Oceania Cup is located in New Caledonia

== Group stage ==
=== Group 1 ===
Pos	Team	Pld	W	D	L	GF	GA	GD	Pts	Qualification
1	Tahiti	3	3	0	0	21	5	+16	6	Advance to final
2	Fiji	3	2	0	1	10	7	+3	4	Advance to third place play-off
3	New Zealand	3	1	0	2	7	8	−1	2	
4	Solomon Islands	3	0	0	3	3	21	−18	0	

25 February 1980

Fiji	3–1	Solomon Islands

Stade de Magenta, Noumea
25 February 1980

Tahiti	3–1	New Zealand
Alfred Wabealo 61', 73'; Erroll Bennett 85'		Steve Sumner 47' (pen.)

Stade de Magenta, Noumea

27 February 1980

Fiji	4–0	New Zealand
D. Chand 10', 39'; M. Vuilabasa 31', 63'

Stade de Magenta, Noumea
27 February 1980

Tahiti	12–1	Solomon Islands

Stade de Magenta, Noumea

29 February 1980

Tahiti	6–3	Fiji

Stade de Magenta, Noumea
29 February 1980

New Zealand	6–1	Solomon Islands
Michael Groom 6'; Mark Armstrong 16', 65', 69'; Bill de Graaf 24', 39'		E. Karitea 66'

Stade de Magenta, Noumea

=== Group 2 ===
Pos	Team	Pld	W	D	L	GF	GA	GD	Pts	Qualification
1	Australia	3	3	0	0	20	2	+18	6	Advance to final
2	New Caledonia	3	2	0	1	12	11	+1	4	Advance to third place play-off
3	Papua New Guinea	3	1	0	2	6	22	−16	2	
4	New Hebrides	3	0	0	3	6	9	−3	0	

24 February 1980

Papua New Guinea	4–3	New Hebrides

Noumea Stadium, Noumea
24 February 1980

Australia	8–0	New Caledonia
Danny Moulis ?'; Ian Hunter ?', ?'; Paul Kay ?', ?'; Eddie Krncevic ?', ?', ?'

Noumea Stadium, Noumea

26 February 1980

Australia	11–2	Papua New Guinea
Danny Moulis ?'; Arno Bertogna ?'; Vic Bozanic ?'; Ian Hunter ?', ?', ?'; Eddie Krncevic ?'; Peter Sharne ?', ?', ?', ?'		Mouagi ?'; Torea ?'

Noumea Stadium, Noumea
26 February 1980

New Caledonia	4–3	New Hebrides

Noumea Stadium, Noumea

28 February 1980

Australia	1–0	New Hebrides
Eddie Krncevic 26'

Noumea Stadium, Noumea
28 February 1980

New Caledonia	8–0	Papua New Guinea

Noumea Stadium, Noumea

== Knockout stage ==
=== Third place ===
1 March 1980

New Caledonia	2–1	Fiji
Jean Xowi 36'; Jacob Xowi 62'		Mohamed Salim 3'

Noumea

=== Final ===
1 March 1980

Australia	4–2	Tahiti
Paul Kay 4', 29'; Danny Moulis; Vic Bozanic		Andre Wabealo 11'; Erroll Bennett

Noumea

1980 OFC Nations Cup

Australia
1st title

== Champions Squad ==
Coach: (West Germany) Rudi Gutendorf

No.	Pos.	Player	Date of birth (age)	Caps	Club
	DF	Alan Davidson	1 June 1960 (aged 19)	1	(Australia) South Melbourne
	MF	Arno Bertogna	9 April 1959 (aged 20)	2	(Australia) Newcastle Australs
	DF	Danny Moulis	25 July 1960 (aged 19)	0	(Australia) Sydney Olympic
	FW	Eddie Krncevic	14 August 1960 (aged 19)	29	(Australia) Marconi
	MF	George Christopoulos	11 December 1960 (aged 19)	1	(Australia) South Melbourne
	GK	Greg Woodhouse	2 January 1960 (aged 20)	8	(Australia) APIA-Leichhardt
	FW	Ian Hunter	10 August 1961 (aged 18)	0	(Australia) Blacktown City
	FW	Mark Brusasco	24 August 1960 (aged 19)	0	(Australia) Brisbane City
	MF	Paul Kay	18 May 1962 (aged 17)	0	(Australia) St. George
	MF	Peter Raskopoulos	22 February 1962 (aged 18)	0	(Australia) Sydney Olympic
	MF	Peter Sharne	22 March 1956 (aged 23)	16	(Australia) Marconi
	MF	Steve Blair	28 December 1961 (aged 18)	0	
	DF	Steve Hogg	14 February 1960 (aged 20)	1	(Australia) Brisbane Lions
	MF	Theo Selemidis	27 October 1959 (aged 20)	0	(Australia) Heidelberg United
	DF	Vic Bozanic	30 October 1957 (aged 22)	0	(Australia) West Adelaide
	GK	Yakka Banovic	12 November 1956 (aged 23)	0	(England) Derby County
