= Gérard Kautai =

Tahitian footballer and manager (born 1952)

Personal information
- Date of birth: 16 February 1952 (age 74)
- Place of birth: Tahiti
- Position: Defender

International career
Years	Team	Apps	(Gls)
1973	Tahiti	4	(0)

Managerial career
- 1996: Tahiti
- 2004–2007: Tahiti
- 2014–: AS Pirae
Medal record
Men's association football
Representing Tahiti
OFC Nations Cup
Runner-up	1973 New Zealand
Pacific Games
Winner	1979 Fiji

Gérard Kautai is a Tahitin professional football manager and a former football player who played as defender.

== Career ==
In 1996 and since January 2004 until September 2007 he coached the Tahiti national football team. Since April 2014 he is a head coach of the AS Pirae.

He is the father of Iotua Kautai, who he also selected to represent Tahiti during the 2004 OFC Nations Cup.

== Honours ==
Tahiti

- OFC Nations Cup: runner-up 1973
- Pacific Games: 1979
