= 1981 South Pacific Mini Games =

1981 Pacific Mini Games
- Host city: Honiara
- Country: Solomon Islands
- Nations: 15
- Athletes: ~600^{*}
- Events: 5 sports
- Opening: July 8, 1981
- Closing: July 16, 1981

The 1981 South Pacific Mini Games were held at Honiara in the Solomon Islands from 8–16 July 1981. It was the first edition of the South Pacific Mini Games.

== Participating countries ==
Fifteen Pacific nations participated in the Games:

- American Samoa
- Cook Islands
- Fiji
- French Polynesia, "Tahiti"
- Guam
- Kiribati
- New Caledonia (99)
- Norfolk Island
- Northern Marianas
- Papua New Guinea (66)
- Solomon Islands
- Tonga
- Vanuatu
- Wallis and Futuna
- Western Samoa

== Sports ==
Five sports were contested at the 1981 South Pacific Mini Games:

- Athletics (36)
- Boxing
- Football (1)
- Netball (1)
- Tennis (5)

== Final medal table ==
New Caledonia topped the medal count:

Rank	Nation	Gold	Silver	Bronze	Total
1	New Caledonia (NCL)	17	17	11	45
2	French Polynesia (PYF)	10	7	5	22
3	Papua New Guinea (PNG)	8	6	6	20
4	Fiji (FIJ)	4	2	3	9
4	Samoa (SAM)	4	2	3	9
6	Solomon Islands (SOL)	2	6	9	17
7	American Samoa (ASA)	2	1	0	3
8	Cook Islands (COK)	1	3	0	4
9	Tonga (TON)	1	0	2	3
10	Wallis and Futuna (WLF)	1	0	1	2
11	Vanuatu (VAN)	0	4	8	12
12	Guam (GUM)	0	0	0	0
12	Kiribati (KIR)	0	0	0	0
12	Norfolk Island (NFK)	0	0	0	0
12	Northern Mariana Islands (MNP)	0	0	0	0
Totals (15 entries)		50	48	48	146

== See also ==
- Athletics at the 1981 South Pacific Mini Games

== Notes ==
^* For the 1981 Mini Games, almost 600 contestants were expected to take part.
