= 2020–21 Tahiti Cup =

2020–21 Coupe de Polynésie
Tournament details
- Country: Tahiti
- Dates: 9 April 2021 – 23 June 2021
- Teams: 24

Final positions
- Champions: Venús
- Runners-up: Pirae

Tournament statistics
- Matches played: 23
- Goals scored: 93 (4.04 per match)
- Top goal scorer(s): Two players (7 goals each)

The 2020–21 Tahiti Cup (also known as Coupe de Polynésie or Coupe Tahiti Nui) is the 82nd edition of the national cup in Tahitian football. A.S. Vénus are the title holders, having won the 2018–19 Tahiti Cup, since the 2019–20 edition was cancelled due the COVID-19 pandemic. In the final, A.S. Vénus defended the title, after defeating A.S. Pirae.

== Teams ==
A total of 23 teams compete in the tournaments: ten teams from Tahiti Ligue 1, seven teams from Tahiti Ligue 2, six teams from Mo'orea, one team from Marquesas Islands and one team from Raiatea.

Teams from 2020–21 Tahiti Ligue 1

- Arue
- Central Sport
- Dragon
- Excelsior
- Jeunes Tahitiens
- Manu-Ura
- Mataiea
- Olympique de Mahina
- Pirae
- Taravao AC
- Tefana
- Tiare Tahiti
- Vénus

Teams from 2020–21 Tahiti Ligue 2

- Papara
- Papenoo
- Taiarapu
- Tamarii Punaruu

Teams from Mo'orea

- Mira
- Tamarii Tapuhute
- Temanava
- Tiare Anani
- Tiare Hinano
- Tohie'a

The draw was held on 29 October 2019.

== First round ==
9 April 2021	Tefana	3–0	Mataiea

10 April 2021	Dragon	7–4	Manu-Ura
	Vero 5'; Mu 23', 78', 79'; Melnyk 37'; Hyianyine 60'; Tze-Yu 90' (pen.)		Paama 2', 10', 54'; Faura 32'

10 April 2021	Tiare Anani	1–7	Pueu
	Vii 30'		Tihoni 10', 15', 49', 52', 53', 90+2'; Teihoarii 86'

10 April 2021	Taiarapu	5–1	Papara
	Parker 6', 12', ?'; Cuny 14'; Ah Lo ?'		Flores 21'

10 April 2021	Tohie'a	0–3	Central Sport

11 April 2021	Temanava	1–2	Olympic Mahina

11 April 2021	Vénus	4–0	Tiare Hinano
	42' (og.); Shan 69'; Tave 75'; Tehau 90'

11 April 2021	Arue	1–0	Papenoo
	Tehaamoana 60'

== Second round ==
13 May 2021	Tearaa	0–4	Olympic Mahina

13 May 2021	Tepuhute	0–1	Tefana

13 May 2021	Pirae	7–2	Mira
	Chan Kat 8', 88'; Labaste 45'; Tetauira 75'; Tinirauari 76'; Mathon 78'; Warren 90'		0' (o.g); Hnyeikone 37'

13 May 2021	Arue	2–0	Taiarapu
	Huri 62'; Taohiro 90+4'

14 May 2021	Vénus	5–0	Central Sport
	Keck 32'; Tehau 63'; Shan 80'; Maru 90', 90+3'

15 May 2021	Tiare Tahiti	2–3	Dragon

15 May 2021	Excelsior	0–3	Pueu
	Teriihapuare 25', 73'; Tihoni 65'

15 May 2021	Tamarii Punaruu	1–0	Jeunes Tahitienes
	Tupea 59'

== Quarter-finals ==
28 May 2021	Vénus	3–1	Olympic Mahina
	Shan; Handerson

28 May 2021	Tefana	3–0	Arue
	O'Connor 37'; Maraetefau 46'; Ckc 74'

29 May 2021	Pueu	0–1	Tamarii Punaruu
			Rohi 62'

29 May 2021	Dragon	1–4	Pirae
	Tufariua 72'		Tinirauari 42'; Tau 112'; Mathon 118'; Tepa 120'

== Semifinals ==
19 June 2021	Vénus	3–1	Tamarii Punaruu
	Tehau 9', 20', 51'		Rohi 42'

19 June 2021	Tefana	0–3	Pirae
			Teriitau; Graglia; Chan Kat

== Final ==
23 June 2021	Vénus	2–1	Pirae
	Tehau 78', 98'		Chan Kat 68'

== Top scorers ==
Rank	Player	Club	Goals
1	(French Polynesia) Teaonui Tehau	Vénus	7
1	(French Polynesia) Yohann Tihoni	Pueu	7
3	(French Polynesia) Gervais Chan Kat	Pirae	4
3	(French Polynesia) Manuarii Shan	Vénus	4
5	(French Polynesia) Francois Mu	Dragon	3
5	(French Polynesia) Matatia Paama	Manu-Ura	3
5	(French Polynesia) Timiona Parker	Taiarapu	3

== See also ==
- Category:Football competitions in French Polynesia
- Category:Football clubs in French Polynesia
- Category:Tahitian footballers
