= 2017–18 Tahiti Cup =

2017–18 Coupe Tahiti Nui
Tournament details
- Country: Tahiti
- Dates: 30 September 2017 – 26 May 2018
- Teams: 21

Final positions
- Champions: AS Dragon (7th title)
- Runners-up: AS Vénus

Tournament statistics
- Matches played: 19
- Goals scored: 106 (5.58 per match)
- Top goal scorer(s): (French Polynesia) Teaonui Tehau (10 goals)

The 2017–18 Tahiti Cup (also known as Coupe Tahiti Nui) was the 79th edition of the national cup in Tahitian football. AS Dragon won the title beating AS Vénus in the final, earning the right to represent Tahiti in the 2018–19 Coupe de France, entering the seventh round.

== Participating teams ==
Ligue 1 (9 Teams)

- AS Aorai
- AS Central Sport
- AS Dragon
- AS Manu-Ura
- AS Pirae
- AS Taiarapu
- AS Tamarii Punaruu
- AS Tefana
- AS Vénus

Ligue 2 (6 Teams)

- A.S. Arue
- AS Excelsior
- AS Jeunes Tahitiens
- AS Olympique Mahina
- A.S. Papenoo
- A.S. Vaiete

Ligue 3 (1 Team)

- A.S. Papara

Ligue 2 Moorea (4 Teams)

- AS Temanava
- A.S. Tiare Anani
- A.S. Tiare Hinano
- A.S. Tiare Tahiti

== First round ==
30 September 2017	AS Taiarapu	18–0	A.S. Papara	Taiarapu-Ouest

30 September 2017	A.S. Central Sport	1–3	AS Tefana	Papeete

30 September 2017	A.S. Pirae	13–0	AS Vaiete	Pirae

30 September 2017	A.S. Tiare Hinano	4–1	A.S. Arue	Pihaena

== Round of 16 ==
27 October 2017	AS Aorai	0–5	A.S. Vénus	Papeete
			Tehau (?)

27 October 2017	AS Pirae	2–2 (3-4 p)	AS Dragon	Pirae
	Chan Kat 33'; Tau 56'		Tze-Yu 30'; Tetauira 61'

27 October 2017	A.S. Tamarii Punaruu	1–6	AS Tefana	Puna'auia

27 October 2017	A.S. Manu-Ura	2–2 (3-5 p)	AS Olympique Mahina	Paea

28 October 2017	AS Temanava	3–0	A.S. Tiare Anani	Ma'atea

28 October 2017	AS Jeunes Tahitiens	3–1	AS Excelsior	Papeete

29 October 2017	A.S. Tiare Hinano	1–0	A.S. Taiarapu	Pihaena

28 October 2017	A.S. Tiare Tahiti	0–0 (2-4 p)	A.S. Papenoo	Maharepa

ia

== Round of 8 ==
24 January 2018	AS Olympique Mahina	1–7	AS Dragon	Mahina

18 February 2018	A.S. Vénus	6–2	AS Papenoo	Mahina

18 February 2018	AS Tiare Hinano	0–3	AS Tefana	Pihaena

18 February 2018	AS Temanava	1–1 (3-4 p)	AS Jeunes Tahitiens	Ma'atea

== Semifinals ==
12 May 2018	AS Dragon	3–2	AS Jeunes Tahitiens	Papeete
		Tze-Yu 24'; Tauha 56'; Vahirua 88'	Maperi 31', 59'

12 May 2018	AS Tefana	5–5 (2-3 p)	AS Vénus	Faaa
	Chang Koei 17'; Tiatia 23'; Mathon 40'; Bourebare 43'; Keck 98'		Tehau 7', 67', 104'; Barbe 36'; Taputuarai 90'

== Final ==
25 May 2018	AS Dragon	2–2 (4-2 p)	AS Vénus	Papeete
	Seino 53'; Tze-Yu 69'		Teaonui Tehau 15', 81'	Stadium: Stade Pater

== See also ==
- 2017–18 Tahiti Ligue 1
