= 2015–16 Tahiti Cup =

2015–16 Coupe Tahiti Nui
Tournament details
- Country: Tahiti
- Dates: 5 September 2015 – 18 March 2016
- Teams: 19

Final positions
- Champions: AS Dragon (5th title)
- Runners-up: AS Vénus

Tournament statistics
- Matches played: 18
- Goals scored: 70 (3.89 per match)

The 2015–16 Tahiti Cup (also known as Coupe Tahiti Nui) was the 76th edition of the national cup in Tahitian football. AS Dragon won the title beating AS Vénus in the final, earning the right to represent Tahiti in the 2016-17 Coupe de France.

== Participating teams ==
Ligue 1 (8 Teams)

- AS Aorai
- AS Central Sport
- AS Dragon
- AS Manu-Ura
- AS Pirae
- AS Taiarapu
- AS Tefana
- AS Vénus

Ligue 2 (7 Teams)

- A.S. Arue
- AS Excelsior
- AS Jeunes Tahitiens
- AS Olympique Mahina
- A.S. Papenoo
- AS Tamarii Punaruu
- A.S. Taravao

Ligue 2 Moorea (4 Teams)

- A.S. Mira
- AS Temanava
- A.S. Tiare Anani
- AS Tiare Tahiti

== First round ==
5 September 2015	A.S. Papenoo	2–4	A.S. Tiare Anani	Papeete

5 September 2015	A.S. Jeunes Tahitiens	1–2	AS Temanava	Papeete

5 September 2015	AS Excelsior	4–2	AS Tamarii Punaruu	Papeete

6 September 2015	A.S. Mira	4–1	AS Taravao	'Āfareaitu

6 September 2015	A.S. Tiare Tahiti	2–1	A.S. Arue	Maharepa

== Second round ==
3 October 2015	AS Central Sport	0–1	AS Dragon	Papeete

3 October 2015	AS Aorai	1–5	AS Vénus	Papeete

3 October 2015	AS Excelsior	1–2	AS Olympique Mahina	Papeete

4 October 2015	A.S. Taiarapu	1–3	AS Tefana	Taiarapu-Ouest

4 October 2015	AS Temanava	1–1 (3–4 p)	A.S. Mira	Ma'atea

4 October 2015	A.S. Tiare Anani	0–0 (3–5 p)	A.S. Tiare Tahiti	'Āfareaitu

== Round of 8 ==
11 November 2015	AS Olympique Mahina	0–3	AS Dragon	Mahina
			Tze-Yu 16', 21', 80'

11 November 2015	AS Vénus	4–2	AS Tefana	Mahina
	Aitamai 24'; Tehina 69', 90'; Tetauira 82'		Tinorua 17'; Lucas 74'

11 November 2015	A.S. Tiare Tahiti	3–3 (4–2 p)	AS Mira	'Āfareaitu

17 November 2015	AS Manu-Ura	3–2	AS Pirae	Paea

== Semi-finals ==
5 February 2016	AS Vénus	4–0	AS Manu-Ura	Mahina
	Tetauira 42'; Tehina 45'; Tehau 67'; Teuaroa 82'

7 February 2016	A.S. Tiare Tahiti	1–1 (2–4 p)	AS Dragon	'Āfareaitu

== Final ==
18 March 2016	AS Vénus	2–3	AS Dragon	Papeete
	Tehau 38'; Tehina 75'		Porlier 42', 67', 89'	Stadium: Stade Pater
