= 2019–20 Tahiti Cup =

2019–20 Coupe de Polynésie
Tournament details
- Country: Tahiti
- Dates: 8 November 2019 – 2020

Final positions
- Champions: Cancelled, no champions

Tournament statistics
- Matches played: 21
- Goals scored: 128 (6.1 per match)
- Top goal scorer(s): Three players (8 goals each)

The 2019–20 Tahiti Cup (also known as Coupe de Polynésie or Coupe Tahiti Nui) is the 81st edition of the national cup in Tahitian football. A.S. Vénus are the defending champions. The winner will earn the right to represent Tahiti in the 2020–21 Coupe de France, entering at the seventh round.

== Teams ==
A total of 25 teams compete in the tournaments: ten teams from Tahiti Ligue 1, seven teams from Tahiti Ligue 2, six teams from Mo'orea, one team from Marquesas Islands and one team from Raiatea.

Teams from 2019–20 Tahiti Ligue 1

- Central Sport
- Dragon
- Jeunes Tahitiens
- Manu-Ura
- Olympique de Mahina
- Pirae
- Taravao AC
- Tefana
- Tiare Tahiti
- Vénus

Teams from 2019–20 Tahiti Ligue 2

- Arue
- Excelsior
- Mataiea
- Papara
- Papenoo
- Taiarapu
- Tamarii Punaruu

Teams from Mo'orea

- Mira
- Tamarii Tapuhute
- Temanava
- Tiare Anani
- Tiare Hinano
- Tohie'a

Team from Marquesas Islands

- Mahitoa

Team from Raiatea

- Samine

The draw was held on 29 October 2019.

== First round ==
8 November 2019	Excelsior	1–3	Tamarii Punaruu
	Ah Sam 59'	Report	Van Sam 62'; Rohi 69'; Ariioehau 85'

8 November 2019	Taiarapu	0–6	Vénus
		Report	Tehau 2', 33', 36'; Pennequin-Le Bras 13'; Keck 25'; Tehina 85'

9 November 2019	Papenoo	0–3	Mataiea
		Report	Tauihara 8'; Doom 32', 35'

9 November 2019	Dragon	5–1	Tefana
	Hnanyine 29'; Tze-Yu 37', 61'; Asen 87'; Kohumoetini 90'	Report	Mathon 91'

10 November 2019	Tiare Hinano	3–2	Tamarii Tapuhute
	Tsing Ting 27', 53'; Tufaimea 30'	Report	Teraihoroa 38'; Vahinetua 58'

10 November 2019	Temanava	4–1	Arue
	Xowi 5'; Wajoka 20'; Hunter 51', 72'	Report	Mare 47'

11 November 2019	Tohie'a	4–2	Olympique de Mahina
	Teikihakaupoko; Varuamana 49', 58', 69'	Report	Anderson 45'; Taupua 88'

17 December 2019	Papara	0–23	Pirae
		Report	Tepa 7', 23', 36', 77', 83', 90'; Chan Kat 15', 26', 37', 39'; Tinirauari 16', 19', 28', 30', 50', 85', 86'; Tiatia 48'; Salem 64'; Labaste 73'; Tetuahuitefarerii 74'; Tiatoa 80'; Li Fung Kuee 88'

17 December 2019	Tiare Anani	1–5	Manu-Ura
	Faarahia 81'	Report	Mu 13'; Roo 31'; Rochette 38'; Tupea 67'; Fuller 89'

== Second round ==
21 December 2019	Jeunes Tahitiens	5–1	Samine
	Vivi 18', 83'; Tefanoua 35'; Voirin 84'; Teamo 85'	Report	Moeino 52'

21 December 2019	Pirae	7–1	Mira
	Li Fung Kuee 35'; Salem 41'; Tinirauari 42'; Labaste 55'; Tepa 77', 91'; Chan Kat 80'	Report	Tchen 88'

21 December 2019	Manu-Ura	0–1	Vénus
		Report	Keck 34'

22 December 2019	Mataiea	1–0	Temanava
	Paariotare 86'	Report

22 December 2019	Tiare Hinano	0–3	Tohie'a
		Report	Gendron 37'; Patu 41'; Pahi 77'

22 December 2019	Tiare Tahiti	3–3 (4–2 p)	Dragon
	Taurua 26'; Porlier 32'; Tehuritaua 55'	Report	Tufariua 1'; Snow 31'; R. Tehau 72'

22 December 2019	Tamarii Punaruu	0–4	Taravao AC
		Report	Tihoni 18', 26'; Papaura 35', 57'

11 January 2020	Mahitoa	1–11	Central Sport
	Kamiambaki 50'	Report	Tissot 3', 46', 59'; Horoi 8', 14', 38'; Ferrand 41'; Duka 70'; Xowie 90'; Cadeusteau 90+2'

== Quarter-finals ==
19 February 2020	Vénus	10–0	Tohie'a
	Tehau 11', 24', 77', 88', 92'; Keck 17', 49'; Faehau 46', 91'; Atani 67'	Report

19 February 2020	Pirae	1–3	Tiare Tahiti
	Tau 46'	Report	Tehuritaua 24'; Odo Chavi 58'; Vaea 87'

28 February 2020	Jeunes Tahitiens	5–0	Mataiea
	Vivi 3'; Hepamoindou 6', 80'; Manarii 52'; Voirin 90'	Report

28 February 2020	Central Sport	2–2 (a.e.t.) (3–5 p)	Taravao AC
	Horoi 48', 98'	Report	Punuatua 2'; Babka 102'

The cup was suspended after the quarter-final stage due to the COVID-19 pandemic in French Polynesia. Initially it was decided to resume the competition in September 2020. However, on 27 May 2020 following new consultation with the clubs, the competition was cancelled, and Tiare Tahiti, who were at third place of the 2019–20 Tahiti Ligue 1 at the time of suspension, qualified for the 2020–21 Coupe de France seventh round as the representative of Tahiti, which would originally be awarded to the winners of the 2019–20 Tahiti Cup.

== Top scorers ==
Rank	Player	Club	Goals
1	(French Polynesia) Teaonui Tehau	Vénus	8
1	(French Polynesia) Patrick Tepa	Pirae	8
1	(French Polynesia) Roonui Tinirauari	Pirae	8
4	(French Polynesia) Jess Horoi	Central Sport	6
5	(French Polynesia) Gervais Chan Kat	Pirae	5
6	(French Polynesia) Tauhiti Keck	Vénus	4
7	(French Polynesia) Jason Papaura	Pueu	3
7	(French Polynesia) Fred Tissot	Central Sport	3
7	(French Polynesia) Pou Mark Varuamana	Tohie'a	3
7	(French Polynesia) Yann Vivi	Jeunes Tahitiens	3
