= 2016–17 Tahiti Cup =

2016–17 Coupe Tahiti Nui
Tournament details
- Country: Tahiti
- Dates: 5 November 2016 – 3 June 2017
- Teams: 20

Final positions
- Champions: AS Tefana (7th title)
- Runners-up: AS Temanava

Tournament statistics
- Matches played: 19
- Goals scored: 93 (4.89 per match)
- Top goal scorer: Marii Taurua (9 goals)

The 2016–17 Tahiti Cup (also known as Coupe Tahiti Nui) was the 78th edition of the national cup in Tahitian football. AS Tefana won the title beating AS Temanava in the final, earning the right to represent Tahiti in the 2017-18 Coupe de France.

== Participating teams ==
Ligue 1 (9 teams)

- AS Arue
- AS Central Sport
- AS Dragon
- AS Manu-Ura
- AS Olympique Mahina
- AS Pirae
- AS Taiarapu
- AS Tefana
- AS Vénus

Ligue 2 (7 teams)

- AS Aorai
- AS Excelsior
- AS Jeunes Tahitiens
- A.S. Papara
- A.S. Papenoo
- AS Tamarii Punaruu
- A.S. Teva

Ligue 2 Moorea (4 teams)

- A.S. Mira
- AS Temanava
- AS Tiare Hinano
- AS Tiare Tahiti

== First round ==
5 November 2016	Aorai	5–1	Papara	Papeete
	Teikihakaupoko 3', 52', 91'; Aka 77'; Gendron 85'		Tapatoa 66'

5 November 2016	Punaruu	2–2 (3–4 p)	Teva	Papeete
	Manaia 14'; Mihuraa 38'		Bougues 13'; Tuaiva 36'

6 November 2016	Tiare	5–0	Excelsior	'Āfareaitu
	Firiapu 4'; Tehuritaua 43', 83', 85'; Nordman 88'

6 November 2016	Tiare H.	3–0	Papenoo	'Āfareaitu
	Vaea 54', 58'; Metua 91'

== Round of 16 ==
1 February 2017	Manu-Ura	1–1 (4-3 p)	Taiarapu	Papeete
	Reid 83'		Babka 7'

1 February 2017	Central Sport	3–0	Pirae	Papeete
		*Cifuentes 20': Yakeula 38'; Warren 57'

4 February 2017	Teva	1–13	Temanava	Papeete
	Siejidr 69'		Taurua 12', 26', 43', 50', 53', 67', 76', 84'; Tetuanui 20'; Pater 38'; Tapotofarerani 65', 67', 89'

4 February 2017	Arue	2–2 (3-4 p)	Vénus	Papeete
	Madrenes 85'; Mou 89'		Tetauira 4', 33'

5 February 2017	Aorai	5–1	Jeunes Tahitiens	Papeete
	Gendron 19'; Ah Ko 51'; Ah Lo 55'; Teikihakaupoko 59', 82'		Chonvant 29'

5 February 2017	Olympic Mahina	0–2	Tefana	Papeete
			Ludivion 41'; Tiaiho 71'

5 February 2017	Tiare	4–0	Mira	'Āfareaitu
	Tehuritaua 13', 74'; Roometua 58'; Nordman 84'

5 February 2017	Tiare H	2–3	Dragon	'Āfareaitu
	Tepa 76'; Teri 80'		Tetauira 14'; Porlier 71'

== Round of 8 ==
21 May 2017	Temanava	2–0	Aorai	'Āfareaitu
	Vahirua 64'; Tetuanui 72'

21 May 2017	Tiare	2–5	Dragon	'Āfareaitu
	Tehuritaua 53'; Faarahia 88'		Doom 28'; Tetauira 49'; Teuepauhu 57', 75'; Scharwitzel 85'

21 May 2017	Tefana	4–0	Vénus	Papeete
	Tinorua 26'; Tevaearai 47'; Atani 67'

21 May 2017	Central Sport	5–4	Manu-Ura	Papeete
	Estay 18'; Castillo 52', 60'; Tangis 73'; Warren 88'		Mu 4', 9'; Rochette 35'; Roo 44'

== Semifinals ==
24 May 2017	Temanava	1–1 (5-4 p)	Dragon	Papeete
	Taurua 83'		Tetauira 92'

24 May 2017	Tefana	5–2	Central Sport	Papeete
	Tinorua 36', 69'; J. Tehau 47'; Bourebare 87'; Atani 95'		Cifuentes 3'; Tangis 9'

== Final ==
6 June 2017	Temanava	4–4 (3-4 p)	Tefana	Papeete
	Teutanui 16', 120'; Vahirua 77'; Ramssi 83'	Report	Tinorua 22', 60'; Tevaearai 53'; Tiahio 116'	Stadium: Stade Pater

== Top scorers ==
Rank	Player	Club	Goals
1	(French Polynesia) Marii Taurua	Temanava	9
2	(French Polynesia) Temarii Tinorua	Tefana	5
2	(French Polynesia) Andre Teikihakaupoko	Aorai	5
4	(French Polynesia) Patua Tetuanui	Temanava	4
4	(French Polynesia) Gilbert Tehuritaua	Tiare	4
6	(French Polynesia) Tamatoa Tetauira	Dragon	3
6	(French Polynesia) Vaiharuru Tapotofarerani	Temanava	3
13 players			2
47 players			1
