= 2018–19 Tahiti Cup =

2018–19 Coupe Tahiti Nui
Tournament details
- Country: Tahiti
- Dates: 09 November 2018 – 14 September 2019
- Teams: 16

Final positions
- Champions: A.S. Vénus (7th title)
- Runners-up: A.S. Tefana

Tournament statistics
- Matches played: 15
- Goals scored: 78 (5.2 per match)
- Top goal scorer: Teaonui Tehau (11 goals)
- All statistics correct as of 11 November 2018.

The 2018–19 Tahiti Cup (also known as Coupe Tahiti Nui) was the 80th edition of the national cup in Tahitian football. AS Dragon were the defending champions. The winner, A.S. Vénus, earned the right to represent Tahiti in the 2019–20 Coupe de France, entering at the seventh round.

== Participating teams ==
Ligue 1 (10 Teams)

- AS Arue
- AS Central Sport
- AS Dragon
- AS Jeunes Tahitiens
- AS Manu-Ura
- AS Pirae
- AS Taiarapu
- AS Tefana
- A.S. Tiare Tahiti
- AS Vénus

Ligue 2 (3 Teams)

- AS Excelsior
- AS Olympique Mahina
- AS Tamarii Punaruu

Ligue 2 Moorea (3 Teams)

- A.S. Mira
- A.S. Tiare Hinano
- AS Temanava

== First round ==
All times are local TAHT (UTC-10)

9 November 2018	Olympic Mahina	1–3	Arue	Stade Pater, Papeete
19:00	Pouira 81'	Report	Taaroamea 27', 29'; Sauvot 73'

9 November 2018	Punaruu	1–8	Tefana	Stade Pater, Papeete
21:15		Report	Tuetina 3'; Mathon 19'; Tiaiho 25'; Tevaearai 46', 89', 90'; Paraue 55'; Guyot 62'

10 November 2018	Mira	1–0	Tiare Hinano	Stade 'Āfareaitu, 'Āfareaitu
15:00	Teraituri 45'	Report

10 November 2018	Excelsior	1–3	Taiarapu	Stade Pater, Papeete
14:00	Tahi 69'	Report	Parker 48', 61', 73'

10 November 2018	Jeunes Tahitiens	0–5	Manu-Ura	Stade Pater, Papeete
16:15		Report	Nauta 1'; Smith Tino 41'; Vernaudon 50' (o.g.); Mu 54'; Tehaamoana 81'

10 November 2018	Vénus	3–0	Central Sport	Stade Pater, Papeete
18:30	Tehau 14', 26', 78'	Report

5 March 2019	Tiare	1–3	Pirae	Stade 'Āfareaitu, 'Āfareaitu
13:30	Porlier 55'	Report	Li Fung Kuee 22', 86'; Tau 90'

5 March 2019	Temanava	3–2	Dragon	Stade 'Āfareaitu, 'Āfareaitu
15:30	Keck 24', 28', 65'	Report	R. Tehau 47'

== Round of 8 ==
All times are local TAHT (UTC-10)

16 March 2019	Tefana	7–1	Arue	Stade Louis Ganivet, Faaa
19:00	Jacq 11'; Mathon 26', 47', 74'; Guyot 60'; Teavearai 83'; Tinorua 90'	Report	Tehina 80'

16 March 2019	Vénus	8–2	Temanava	Stade Municipal, Mahina
14:00	Barbe 20'; Atani 76'; Manro 91'; Tehau 96', 109', 111', 118'; Faehau 114'	Report	Topotofarerani 79'; Keck 88'

16 March 2019	Pirae	6–3	Mira	Stade Pater, Pirae
16:15	Tau 4'; Li Fung Kuee 36', 78', 88'; Salem 39'; Warren 85'; Faehau 114'	Report	Tiaoao 6', 45'

19 March 2019	Manu-Ura	4–0	Taiarapu	Stade Paea, Paea
19:30	Roo 36'; Mu 76'; Wathiepel 78'; Warren 85'; Saijin 88'	Report

== Semi finals ==
The semi finals took place consecutively on 1 May 2019, at Stade Pater in Pirae. All times are local TAHT (UTC-10)

1 May 2019	Tefana	4–1	Manu-Ura	Stade Pater, Pirae
16:00	Tiaiho 2'; Tuteina 65'; Mathon 66'; Lucas 89'	Report	Rochette 27'

1 May 2019	Vénus	2–0	Pirae	Stade Pater, Pirae
18:15	Tehau 25'; Barbe 49'	Report

== Final ==
The final took place on 14 September 2019 at Stade Pater in Pirae

14 September 2019	Vénus	3–0	Tefana	Stade Pater, Pirae
	Tehau 8', 51' (pen.), 89'	Report

== Top scorers ==
Rank	Player	Club	Goals
1	(French Polynesia) Teaonui Tehau	Vénus	11
2	(French Polynesia) Raimana Li Fung Kuee	Pirae	5
2	(France) Benoit Mathon	Tefana	5
4	(French Polynesia) Tunoa Tevaearai	Tefana	4
4	(French Polynesia) Tauhiti Keck	Temanava	4

== See also ==
- 2018–19 Tahiti Ligue 1
- Tahiti Ligue 2
