= 2021–22 Tahiti Ligue 1 =

Tahiti Ligue 1
- Season: 2021–22
- Champions: AS Pirae (11th title)
- Relegated: AS Mataiea
- Matches: 132
- Goals: 670 (5.08 per match)
- Top goalscorer: (French Polynesia) Teaonui Tehau (42 goals)
- Biggest home win: Dragon 15-0 Mataiea (22 Apr 2022)
- Biggest away win: Excelsior 2-16 Dragon (6 Nov 2021)

The 2021–22 Tahiti Ligue 1 was the 75th season of the Tahiti Ligue 1, the top-flight football league in Tahiti. The season started on 5 November 2021. A.S. Pirae are the defending champions.

== Teams ==
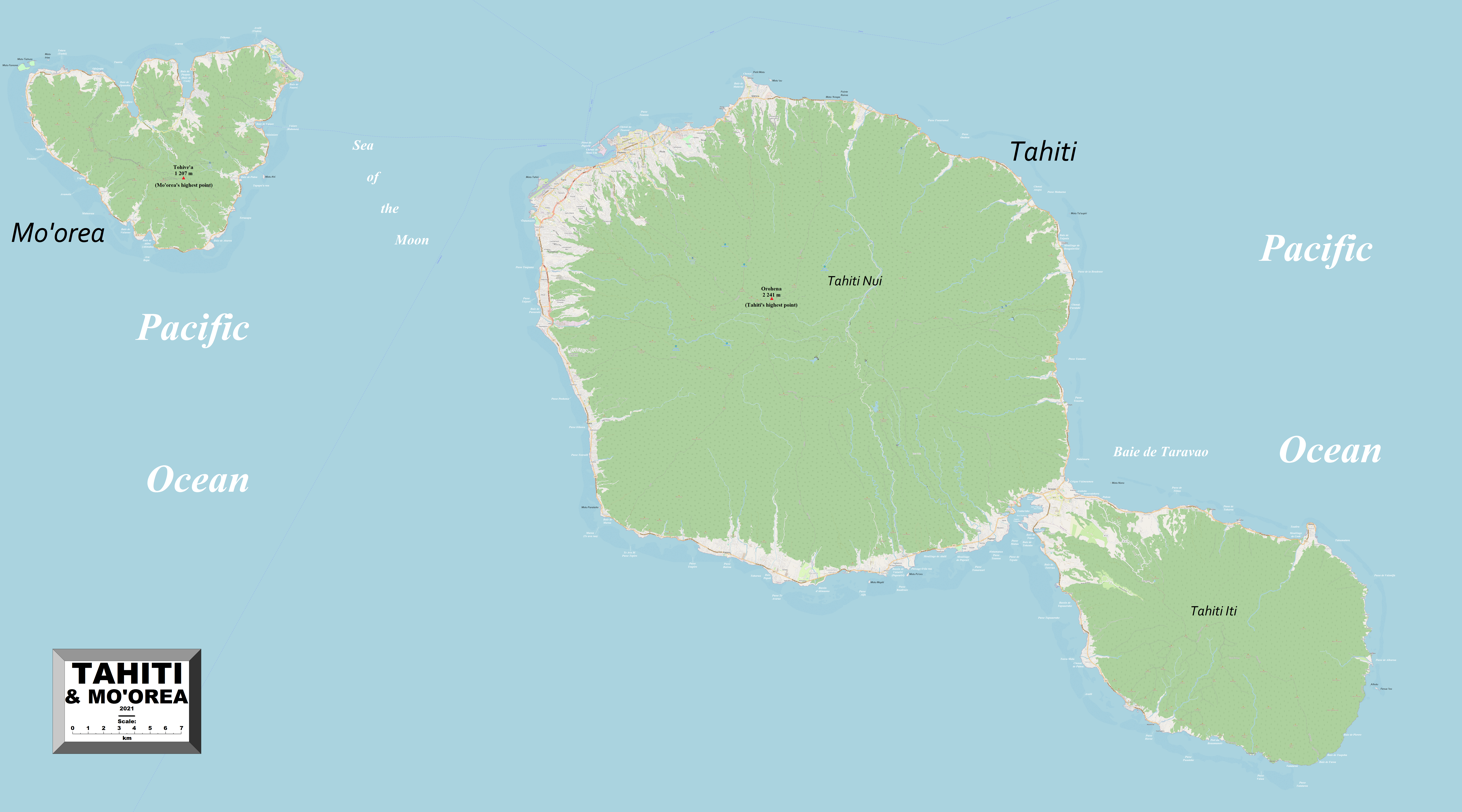
Locations of the 2021–22 Tahiti Ligue 1 teams

A total of twelve teams compete in the league. Tamarii Punaruu and A.S. Temanava were promoted from 2020 to 2021 Ligue 2, replacing Manu-Ura, Arue and Jeunes Tahitiens .

=== Stadium and locations ===
Note: Table lists in alphabetical order.

Team	City	Stadium	Capacity
A.S. Central Sport	Papeete	Stade Pater	11,700
A.S. Dragon	Papeete	Stade Pater	11,700
A.S. Excelsior	Papeete	Stade Mission	1,000
A.S. Mataiea	Teva I Uta	Stade Mataiea	1,000
A.S. Olympique de Mahina	Mahina	Stade Municipal de Mahina	1,000
A.S. Pirae	Pirae	Stade Pater	11,700
A.S. Pueu	Taiarapu-Est	Stade Teahupo'o	1,200
A.S. Tamarii Punaruu	Puna'auia	Stade Punaruu	2,000
A.S. Tefana	Faaa	Stade Louis Ganivet	5,000
A.S. Temanava	Ma'atea	Stade Ma'atea	2,000
A.S. Tiare Tahiti	Afareaitu, Moorea	Stade Afareaitu	1,000
A.S. Vénus	Mahina	Stade Municipal de Mahina	1,000

=== Personnel and sponsoring ===
Note: Flags indicate national team as has been defined under FIFA eligibility rules. Players may hold more than one non-FIFA nationality.

Team	Head coach	Captain	Kit manufacturer	Main sponsor
Central Sport		(French Polynesia) Fred Tissot	Made by club	none
Dragon		(French Polynesia) Raimana Li Fung Kuee	Nike	Autopro
Excelsior	(French Polynesia) Bruno Tehaamoana	(French Polynesia) Leon Taharia Chan	Patrick	Total
Mataiea	(French Polynesia) Teita Ori	(French Polynesia) Heifara Mau	Patrick	Teva Import
Olympique de Mahina		(French Polynesia) Vehia Tetuaroa	Xtep	Vini Vini
Pirae		(French Polynesia) Alvin Tehau	Nike	
Pueu		(French Polynesia) Yohann Tihoni	Macron	
Tamarii Punaruu		(French Polynesia) Garry Rochette	Made by club	none
Tefana		(French Polynesia) Viritua Tiahio	Made by club	Hellaby Crown
Temanava		(New Caledonia) Makalu Xowi	Macron	Polymat
Tiare Tahiti		(French Polynesia) Rico Haring	Made by club	Polymat
Vénus		(French Polynesia) Teaonui Tehau	Made by club	Yune Tung

== League table ==
=== Regular season ===
Note: 4 points for a win, 2 points for a draw, 1 point for a defeat.

Pos	Team	Pld	W	D	L	GF	GA	GD	Pts	Qualification or relegation
1	Pirae (C)	22	18	2	2	95	14	+81	78	Qualification to 2023 OFC Champions League
2	Dragon	22	17	3	2	114	24	+90	76	Qualification to 2023 OFC Champions League
3	Vénus	22	17	3	2	98	19	+79	76	
4	Tefana	22	14	5	3	71	27	+44	69	
5	Tamarii Punaruu	22	10	3	9	40	38	+2	55	
6	Central Sport	22	10	2	10	44	50	−6	54	
7	Pueu	22	9	1	12	50	48	+2	50	
8	Temanava	22	7	1	14	45	68	−23	44	
9	Tiare Tahiti	22	6	2	14	29	54	−25	42	
10	Olympique de Mahina	22	6	1	15	31	86	−55	41	
11	Excelsior	22	4	1	17	30	96	−66	35	
12	Mataiea (R)	22	1	0	21	23	146	−123	25	Relegated to Tahiti Ligue 2

Updated to match(es) played on 16 July 2022. Source:
- C=Champion
- R=Relegated

== Top scorers ==
Rank	Player	Club	Goals
1	(French Polynesia) Teaonui Tehau	Vénus	42
2	(French Polynesia) Roonui Tinirauarii	Pirae / Dragon	38
3	(France) Benoit Mathon	Pirae	28
4	(New Caledonia) Makalu Xowi	Temanava	26
5	(French Polynesia) Francois Mu	Dragon	20
6	(French Polynesia) Rainui Tze-Yu	Vénus	18
7	(French Polynesia) Sandro Tau	Pirae	17
8	(French Polynesia) Franck Papaura	Pueu	16
9	(French Polynesia) Yohann Tihoni	Pirae	15
10	(French Polynesia) Roonui Tehau	Vénus	14
10	(French Polynesia) Raimana Tetuanui	Pueu	14

Most goals in a single game

- 8 goals:
  - Teaonui Tehau (Vénus) 0–15 against Mataiea, round 17, 28 May 2022.

== Hat-tricks ==
Player	For	Against	Score	Date
(French Polynesia) Viritua Tiaiho	Tefana	Mataiea	10-2	5 November 2021
(French Polynesia) Roonui Tinirauarii	Pirae	Temanava	7-0	6 November 2021
(French Polynesia) Raimana Li Fung Kuee	Dragon	Excelsior	2-16	6 November 2021
(French Polynesia) Francois Mu	Dragon	Excelsior	2-16	6 November 2021
(French Polynesia) Rainui Tze-Yu^{6}	Dragon	Excelsior	2-16	6 November 2021
(French Polynesia) Teaonui Tehau^{4}	Vénus	Excelsior	1-6	27 November 2021
(French Polynesia) Roonui Tehau	Vénus	Central Sport	0-5	3 December 2021
(French Polynesia) Teaonui Tehau^{5}	Vénus	Mataiea	12-0	17 December 2021
(French Polynesia) Roonui Tehau^{4}	Vénus	Mataiea	12-0	17 December 2021
(French Polynesia) Teaonui Tehau^{5}	Vénus	Temanava	0-14	8 January 2022
(French Polynesia) Roonui Tehau^{4}	Vénus	Temanava	0-14	8 January 2022
(French Polynesia) Sandro Tau	Pirae	Mataiea	11-1	18 January 2022
(French Polynesia) Teiki Vaea	Tiare T	Mataiea	1-7	22 January 2022
(French Polynesia) Rainui Norman	Tiare T	Mataiea	1-7	22 January 2022
(French Polynesia) Francois Mu	Dragon	Central Sport	7-0	22 January 2022
(New Caledonia) Makalu Xowi^{4}	Temanava	Mataiea	8-3	12 February 2022
(French Polynesia) Narcisse Xowie	Central Sport	Tiare T	4-0	9 April 2022
(French Polynesia) Roonui Tinirauarii	Dragon	Excelsior	5-1	9 April 2022
(French Polynesia) Goran Pauzu	Tefana	Olympic Mahina	9-0	22 Apríl 2022
(French Polynesia) Teaonui Tehau^{4}	Vénus	Excelsior	7-2	22 April 2022
(French Polynesia) Roonui Tinirauarii^{6}	Dragon	Mataiea	15-0	22 April 2022
(French Polynesia) Roonui Tinirauarii^{5}	Dragon	Punaruu	6-2	30 April 2022
(French Polynesia) Franck Papaura	Pueu	Mataiea	8-2	30 April 2022
(French Polynesia) Sandro Tau^{4}	Pirae	Olympic Mahina	0-14	20 May 2022
(France) Benoit Mathon	Pirae	Olympic Mahina	0-14	20 May 2022
(New Caledonia) Makalu Xowi^{5}	Temanava	Excelsior	8-1	21 May 2022
(French Polynesia) Roonui Tinirauarii^{4}	Dragon	Olympic Mahina		27 May 2022
(French Polynesia) Teaonui Tehau^{8}	Vénus	Mataiea	0-15	28 May 2022
(French Polynesia) Rainui Tze-Yu	Vénus	Mataiea	0-15	28 May 2022
(France) Benoit Mathon	Pirae	Tefana	6-1	3 June 2022
(French Polynesia) Teaonui Tehau	Vénus	Olympic Mahina	8-0	17 June 2022
(French Polynesia) Rainui Tze-Yu	Vénus	Olympic Mahina	8-0	17 June 2022
(France) Benoit Mathon	Pirae	Mataiea	1-9	18 June 2022
(French Polynesia) Sandro Tau	Pirae	Mataiea	1-9	18 June 2022
(French Polynesia) Loyd Hnawoa	Central Sport	Olympic Mahina	4-1	8 July 2022
(French Polynesia) Roonui Tinirauarii^{5}	Dragon	Tiare	1-7	9 July 2022
(New Caledonia) Makalu Xowi	Temanava	Mataiea	1-4	9 July 2022
(French Polynesia) Tauatua Lucas	Punaruu	Olympic Mahina	8-3	16 July 2022
(French Polynesia) Laurens Dhou	Excelsior	Mataiea	2-5	16 July 2022
