= 2020–21 Tahiti Ligue 2 =

Tournament details
- Country: Tahiti
- Teams: 13

Final positions
- Champions: A.S. Tamarii Punaruu
- Runner-up: AS Tamarii Temanava
- All statistics correct as of 2021-05-07.

The 2020–21 Tahiti Ligue 2 was the second highest division of the Tahitian football league. The competition is organized and administered by Fédération Tahitienne de Football.

== Participating teams ==
Thirteen clubs participated in the 2020–21 edition of the competition.

- Central Sport B
- Excelsior B
- Manu Ura B
- Mataiea B
- Olympic Mahina 2
- A.S. Papara
- A.S. Papenoo
- Pirae B
- A.S. Taiarapu
- AS Tamarii Punaruu
- AS Tamarii Temanava
- Tefana B
- Vénus B

== Final classification ==
| Class | Club | Matches | Victories | Draws | Defeats | Points |
|---|---|---|---|---|---|---|
| 1 | AS Tamarii Punaruu | 12 | 11 | 1 | 0 | 46 |
| 2 | AS Tamarii Temanava | 12 | 9 | 2 | 1 | 41 |
| 3 | Tefana B | 12 | 9 | 1 | 2 | 40 |
| 4 | A.S. Taiarapu | 12 | 9 | 0 | 3 | 39 |
| 5 | Venus B | 12 | 8 | 0 | 4 | 36 |
| 6 | Pirae B | 12 | 7 | 1 | 4 | 34 |
| 7 | Papara FC | 12 | 5 | 0 | 7 | 27 |
| 8 | Central Sport B | 12 | 4 | 1 | 7 | 25 |
| 9 | A.S. Papenoo | 12 | 3 | 3 | 6 | 24 |
| 10 | Mataiea B | 12 | 3 | 1 | 8 | 21 |
| 11 | Olympic Mahina B | 12 | 2 | 1 | 9 | 19 |
| 12 | Manu Ura B | 12 | 2 | 1 | 9 | 17 [-1] |
| 13 | Excelsior B | 12 | 0 | 0 | 12 | 10 [-1] |
