= 2020–21 Tahiti Ligue 1 =

Tahiti Ligue 1
- Season: 2020–21
- Champions: A.S. Pirae (10th title)
- Relegated: Arue; Jeunes Tahitiens; Manu-Ura
- Matches: 132
- Goals: 636 (4.82 per match)
- Top goalscorer: (French Polynesia) Teaonui Tehau (27 goals)
- Biggest home win: Vénus 9-1 Mataiea (14 Nov 2021)
- Biggest away win: Excelsior 1-12 Pirae (23 Oct 2020)

The 2020–21 Tahiti Ligue 1 is the 74th season of the Tahiti Ligue 1, the top-flight football league in Tahiti. The season started on 08 October 2020. A.S. Pirae are the defending champions.

== Format Change ==
Due to a 3-month interruption caused by the Covid-19 pandemic, only a single round robin will be played, followed by a playoff between the top-4 to determine the championship and qualification for the OFC Champions League

== Teams ==
A total of thirteen teams compete in the league. Due the COVID-19 pandemic in French Polynesia, the last season was cancelled with no relegation. Excelsior, Mataiea and Arue were promoted. Taravao AC changed name to AS Pueu.

=== Stadium and locations ===
Note: Table lists in alphabetical order.

Team	City	Stadium	Capacity
A.S. Arue	Arue	Stade Boris Léontieff	1,000
A.S. Central Sport	Papeete	Stade Pater	11,700
A.S. Dragon	Papeete	Stade Pater	11,700
A.S. Excelsior	Papeete	Stade Mission	1,000
A.S. Jeunes Tahitiens	Papeete	Stade Pater	11,700
A.S. Manu-Ura	Paea	Stade Paea	
A.S. Mataiea	Teva I Uta		
A.S. Olympique de Mahina	Mahina	Stade Municipal de Mahina	1,000
A.S. Pirae	Pirae	Stade Pater	11,700
A.S. Pueu	Taiarapu-Est	Stade Teahupo'o	
A.S. Tefana	Faaa	Stade Louis Ganivet	5,000
A.S. Tiare Tahiti	Afareaitu, Moorea	Stade Afareaitu	1,000
A.S. Vénus	Mahina	Stade Municipal de Mahina	1,000

=== Personnel and sponsoring ===
Note: Flags indicate national team as has been defined under FIFA eligibility rules. Players may hold more than one non-FIFA nationality.

Team	Head coach	Captain	Kit manufacturer	Main sponsor
Arue		(French Polynesia) Mathieu Talbot	Macron	none
Central Sport		(French Polynesia) Jess Horoi	Macron	Playerz
Dragon		(French Polynesia) Victor Snow	Patrick	Yune Tung
Excelsior	(French Polynesia) Bruno Tehaamoana	(French Polynesia) Leon Taharia Chan	Patrick	Teva Import
Jeunes Tahitiens		(French Polynesia) William Voirin	Patrick	OPT
Manu-Ura	(French Polynesia) Vaitea Vansam		Made by club	none
Mataiea	(French Polynesia) Teita Ori	(French Polynesia) Heifara Mau		
Olympique de Mahina		(French Polynesia) Vehia Tetuaroa	Xtep	Vini Vini
Pirae		(French Polynesia) Ariihau Teriitau	Patrick	
Pueu		(French Polynesia) Yohann Tihoni	Macron	
Tefana		(French Polynesia) Kevin Tuteina	Made by club	Hellaby Crown
Tiare Tahiti		(French Polynesia) Tevaihau Tehuritaua	Patrick	
Vénus		(French Polynesia) Teaonui Tehau	Made by club	Yune Tung

== League table ==
=== Regular season ===
Note: 4 points for a win, 2 points for a draw, 1 point for a defeat.

Pos	Team	Pld	W	D	L	GF	GA	GD	Pts	Qualification or relegation
1	Pirae	12	10	1	1	68	14	+54	43	Qualification to Championship play-off
2	Vénus	12	10	1	1	58	14	+44	43	Qualification to Championship play-off
3	Dragon	12	9	2	1	55	15	+40	41	Qualification to Championship play-off
4	Pueu	12	8	2	2	42	20	+22	38	Qualification to Championship play-off
5	Central Sport	12	6	2	4	20	23	−3	32	Qualification to Championship play-off
6	Tiare Tahiti	12	5	3	4	36	24	+12	30	Qualification to Championship play-off
7	Tefana	12	5	3	4	27	21	+6	30	Qualification to Championship play-off
8	Jeunes Tahitiens	12	5	1	6	21	32	−11	28	Qualification to Relegation play-off
9	Olympique de Mahina	12	2	2	8	18	49	−31	20	Qualification to Relegation play-off
10	Manu-Ura	12	5	0	7	22	39	−17	27	Qualification to Relegation play-off
11	Mataiea	12	2	0	10	20	61	−41	18	Qualification to Relegation play-off
12	Arue	12	1	1	10	10	42	−32	16	Qualification to Relegation play-off
13	Excelsior	12	1	0	11	17	60	−43	15	Qualification to Relegation play-off

Updated to match(es) played on 17 October 2020. Source: FTF

=== Championship play-off ===
Note: 4 points for a win, 2 points for a draw, 1 point for a defeat.

Pos	Team	Pld	W	D	L	GF	GA	GD	Pts	Qualification or relegation
1	Pirae	6	4	2	0	24	9	+15	20	Qualification to 2022 OFC Champions League
2	Vénus	6	5	1	0	14	21	−7	22	Qualification to 2022 OFC Champions League
3	Dragon	6	3	0	3	19	16	+3	15	
4	Tefana	6	3	0	3	20	12	+8	15	
5	Pueu	6	2	2	2	17	25	−8	14	
6	Tiare Tahiti	6	0	2	4	10	28	−18	8	
7	Central Sport	6	0	1	5	7	20	−13	7	

Updated to match(es) played on 08 January 2022. Source: FTF

=== Relegation play-off ===
Note: 4 points for a win, 2 points for a draw, 1 point for a defeat.

Pos	Team	Pld	W	D	L	GF	GA	GD	Pts	Qualification or relegation
1	Olympique de Mahina	10	8	2	0	23	10	+13	36	
2	Mataiea	10	6	1	3	25	19	+6	29	
3	Excelsior	10	6	0	4	21	17	+4	28	
4	Manu-Ura	10	4	1	5	20	25	−5	23	Promotion/relegation play-off
5	Arue	10	1	2	7	7	17	−10	15	Relegated to Tahiti Ligue 2
6	Jeunes Tahitiens	10	1	2	7	15	23	−8	15	Relegated to Tahiti Ligue 2

Updated to match(es) played on 08 January 2022. Source: FTF

=== Promotion/relegation play-0ff ===
10 July 2021	Manu-Ura	0–5	Temanava

Manu-Ura relegated after losing promotion/relegation play-off.

== Top scorers ==
Rank	Player	Club	Goals
1	(French Polynesia) Teaonui Tehau	Vénus	27
2	(French Polynesia) Sandro Tau	Pirae	18
3	(France) Benoit Mathon	Pirae	14
3	(French Polynesia) Manaraii Porlier	Tiare T	14
5	(French Polynesia) Yohann Tihoni	Pueu	12
6	(French Polynesia) Francois Mu	Dragon	10
6	(French Polynesia) Yann Vivi	Jeunes Tahitiens	10
6	(French Polynesia) Rainui Tze-Yu	Dragon	10
9	(French Polynesia) Gervais Chan Kat	Pirae	9
9	(French Polynesia) Matatia Paama	Manu-Ura	9
9	(French Polynesia) Tutehau Tufariua	Dragon	9

Most goals in a single game

- 6 goals:
  - Teaonui Tehau (Venus) 1-10 against Excelsior, round 4, 1 November 2020.

== Hat-tricks ==
Player	For	Against	Score	Date
(French Polynesia) Teaonui Tehau	Vénus	Jeunes Tahitiens	3-1	23 October 2020
(French Polynesia) Sandro Tau	Pirae	Excelsior	1-12	23 October 2020
(French Polynesia) Teaonui Tehau^{6}	Vénus	Excelsior	1-10	1 November 2020
(French Polynesia) Gervais Chan Kat	Pirae	Vénus	5-3	7 November 2020
(French Polynesia) Manaraii Porlier^{4}	Tiare	Mataiea	8-1	7 November 2020
(French Polynesia) Teaonui Tehau	Vénus	Mataiea	9-1	14 November 2020
(French Polynesia) Tauhiti Keck	Vénus	Mataiea	9-1	14 November 2020
(French Polynesia) Sandro Tau^{5}	Pirae	Jeunes Tahitiens	1-9	20 February 2021
(France) Benoit Mathon	Pirae	Jeunes Tahitiens	1-9	20 February 2021
(French Polynesia) Manaraii Porlier	Tiare	Olympic Mahina	2-9	20 February 2021
(French Polynesia) Teaonui Tehau^{4}	Vénus	Manu-Ura	1-6	13 March 2021
(French Polynesia) Tymmons Tehei	Manu-Ura	Arue	0-8	27 March 2021
(French Polynesia) Matatia Paama	Manu-Ura	Arue	0-8	27 March 2021
(French Polynesia) Yann Vivi^{4}	Jeunes Tahitiens	Olympic Mahina	6-1	27 March 2021
(French Polynesia) Tehotu Doom	Pueu	Excelsior	6-3	27 March 2021
(French Polynesia) Teaonui Tehau	Vénus	Tiare	6-1	27 March 2021
(French Polynesia) Sandro Tau	Pirae	Olympic Mahina	0-10	1 April 2021
(French Polynesia) Rainui Tze-Yu	Dragon	Tefana	4-5	1 April 2021
(French Polynesia) Manaraii Porlier	Tiare	Manu-Ura	1-6	2 April 2021
