= 2018–19 Tahiti Ligue 2 =

Tournament details
- Country: Tahiti
- Teams: 8

Final positions
- Champions: AS Taravao AC
- Runners-up: AS Olympic Mahina

The 2018–19 Tahiti Ligue 2 was the second highest division of the Tahitian football league. The competition is organized and administered by Fédération Tahitienne de Football.

== Participating teams ==
During the 2018–19 season, ten teams registered to play, however, only nine teams participated in the competition, after AS Teva FC withdrew from the competition.

- AS Excelsior
- Tefana B
- AS Olympic Mahina
- AS Mataiea
- AS Tamarii Punaruu
- A.S. Taiarapu
- A.S. Papenoo
- A.S. Papara
- A.S. Vaiete
- AS Teva FC(withdrew)

== Final classification ==
Class	Club	Matches	Victories	Draws	Defeats	Points	Status
1	AS Taravao AC	24	20	3	1	85	Promoted
2	AS Olympic Mahina	24	13	9	2	72	Promotion Playoff
3	Tefana B	24	12	4	8	63	
4	AS Excelsior	24	11	6	7	61	
5	AS Mataiea	24	10	4	7	58	
6	AS Tamarii Punaruu	24	8	6	10	54	
7	AS Vaiete	24	9	2	13	49	
8	AS Papenoo	24	4	5	15	33	
9	AS Papara	24	1	5	22	25	
withdrew	AS Teva FC	withdrew	withdrew	withdrew	withdrew	withdrew	withdrew
