= 2018–19 Tahiti Ligue 1 =

Tahiti Ligue 1
- Season: 2018–19
- Champions: Vénus (10th title)
- Relegated: Arue; Taiarapu
- OFC Champions League: Vénus; Tiare Tahiti
- Matches: 135
- Goals: 703 (5.21 per match)
- Top goalscorer: (French Polynesia) Teaonui Tehau (42 goals)
- Biggest home win: Pirae 12–1 Arue (11 May 2019)
- Biggest away win: Taiarapu 3–9 Vénus (15 Jan 2019)

The 2018–19 Tahiti Ligue 1 is the 72nd season of the Tahiti Ligue 1, the top-flight football league in Tahiti. The season started on 28 September 2018. A.S. Central Sport are the defending champions. Many league games took place in front of dozens of spectators.

== Team changes ==
=== To Ligue 1 Vini ===
Promoted from 2017 to 2018 Ligue 2

- A.S. Arue
- A.S. Jeunes Tahitiens

Promoted from Ligue 2 Moorea

- A.S. Tiare Tahiti

Relegated to 2018–19 Ligue 2

- AS Aorai
- A.S. Tamarii Punaruu

Excluded

- Tahiti U-19

== Teams ==
Locations of the 2018–19 Tahiti Ligue 1 teams.
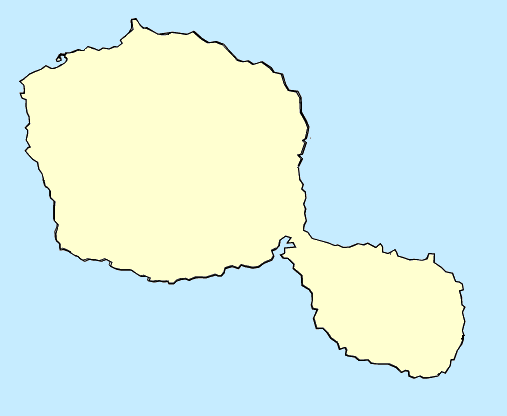
Locations of the 2018–19 Tahiti Ligue 1 teams in Tahiti island.

A total of ten teams compete in the league.

=== Stadiums and locations ===
Note: Table lists in alphabetical order.

Team	City	Stadium	Capacity
A.S. Arue	Arue	Stade Arue	
A.S. Central Sport	Papeete	Stade Pater	11,700
A.S. Dragon	Papeete	Stade Pater	11,700
A.S. Jeunes Tahitiens	Papeete	Stade Pater	11,700
A.S. Manu-Ura	Paea	Stade Paea	
A.S. Pirae	Pirae	Stade Pater	11,700
A.S. Taiarapu	Taiarapu-Ouest	Stade Teahupo'o	
A.S. Tefana	Faaa	Stade Louis Ganivet	5,000
A.S. Tiare Tahiti	Afareaitu, Moorea	Stade Afareaitu	1,000
A.S. Vénus	Mahina	Stade Municipal de Mahina	1,000

=== Personnel and sponsoring ===
Note: Flags indicate national team as has been defined under FIFA eligibility rules. Players may hold more than one non-FIFA nationality.

Team	Head coach	Captain	Kit manufacturer	Main sponsor
Arue		(French Polynesia) Clayton Paitia	Nike	N/A
Central Sport	(French Polynesia) Efrain Araneda	(French Polynesia) Fred Tissot	Nike	Isostar
Dragon	(French Polynesia) Timinoa Asen	(French Polynesia) Tamatoa Tetauira	Patrick	Yune Tung
Jeunes Tahitiens		(French Polynesia) Tamatoa Tehau	Nike	N/A
Manu-Ura	(France) Robert Rodriguez	(French Polynesia) Garry Rochette	Made by club	Magasin Laut
Pirae		(French Polynesia) Ariihau Teriitau	Patrick	Vini
Taiarapu		(French Polynesia) Edson Lemaire	Made by club	N/A
Tefana	(French Polynesia) Sébastien Labayen	(French Polynesia) Alvin Tehau	Made by club	Hellaby Crown
Tiare Tahiti		(French Polynesia) Rico Haring	Axiom	Polymat
Vénus	(French Polynesia) Samuel Garcia	(French Polynesia) Teaonui Tehau	Nike	Yune Tung

== League table ==
Note: 4 points for a win, 2 points for a draw, 1 point for a defeat.

Pos	Team	Pld	W	D	L	GF	GA	GD	Pts	Qualification or relegation
1	Vénus (C)	27	17	8	2	78	29	+49	86	Qualification to OFC Champions League group stage
2	Tiare Tahiti (Q)	27	18	4	5	76	37	+39	85	Qualification to OFC Champions League group stage
3	Tefana	27	16	5	6	73	41	+32	80	
4	Pirae	27	16	4	7	91	46	+45	79	
5	Central Sport	27	14	7	6	89	48	+41	76	
6	Dragon (Note: Dragon deducted 2 points.)	27	12	4	11	64	62	+2	65	
7	Manu-Ura	27	10	6	11	48	46	+2	63	
8	Jeunes Tahitiens	27	5	4	18	40	68	−28	46	
9	Arue (R)	27	2	2	23	28	128	−100	35 (Note: Head-to-head results: Arue 1–3 Taiarapu, Arue 3–1 Taiarapu, Taiarapu 3–4 Arue.)	Qualification to Relegation playoff
10	Taiarapu (R)	27	2	2	23	43	125	−82	35	Relegation to Tahiti Ligue 2

Source: FTF
(C) Champions; (Q) Qualified for the phase indicated; (R) Relegated

== Relegation playoff ==
The winner of the relegation playoff between Arue (Ligue 1 9th place) and Olympique de Mahina (Ligue 2 2nd place) earned a place in the 2019–20 Tahiti Ligue 1.

2 June 2019

Arue	2–4	Olympique de Mahina

Olympique de Mahina were promoted; Arue were relegated.

== Top scorers ==
Rank	Player	Club	Goals
1	(French Polynesia) Teaonui Tehau	Vénus	42
2	(French Polynesia) Sandro Tau	Pirae	30
3	(French Polynesia) Fred Tissot	Central Sport	24
4	(France) Benoit Mathon	Tefana	22
5	(French Polynesia) Manaraii Porlier	Tiare	20
6	(French Polynesia) Jess Horoi	Central Sport	18
7	(French Polynesia) Rainui Tze-Yu	Dragon	16
8	(French Polynesia) Tamatoa Tetauira	Dragon	15
9	(French Polynesia) Timiona Parker	Taiarapu	14
10	(French Polynesia) Francois Mu	Manu-Ura	13
10	(French Polynesia) Gary Rochette	Manu-Ura	13

== Hat-tricks ==
Player	For	Against	Score	Date
(French Polynesia) Teaonui Tehau^{4}	Vénus	Jeunes Tahitiens	6-0	5 October 2018
(French Polynesia) Teaonui Tehau^{5}	Vénus	Taiarapu	6-4	19 October 2018
(French Polynesia) Tamatoa Tetauira^{4}	Dragon	Arue	5-3	19 October 2018
(French Polynesia) Manaraii Porlier	Tiare	Arue	2-5	27 October 2018
(French Polynesia) Yann Vivi	Jeunes Tahitiens	Arue	6-0	17 November 2018
(French Polynesia) Karl Firiapu^{4}	Tiare	Tefana	2-5	24 November 2018
(French Polynesia) Jess Horoi	Central Sport	Dragon	4-4	24 November 2018
(French Polynesia) Jess Horoi	Central Sport	Arue	8-0	7 December 2018
(French Polynesia) Sandro Tau^{4}	Pirae	Taiarapu	5-0	7 December 2018
(French Polynesia) Rooarii Roo	Manu-Ura	Jeunes Tahitiens	4-0	21 December 2018
(French Polynesia) Manaraii Porlier	Tiare	Taiarapu	3-6	22 December 2018
(French Polynesia) Timiona Parker	Taiarapu	Vénus	3-9	15 January 2019
(French Polynesia) Teaonui Tehau^{5}	Vénus	Taiarapu	3-9	15 January 2019
(France) Benoit Mathon^{4}	Tefana	Manu-Ura	5-0	25 January 2019
(French Polynesia) Fred Tissot	Central Sport	Taiarapu	5-2	29 January 2019
(French Polynesia) Sandro Tau	Pirae	Arue	3-7	2 February 2019
(French Polynesia) William Voirin	Jeunes Tahitiens	Arue	0-8	22 February 2019
(French Polynesia) Fred Tissot	Central Sport	Arue	0-8	1 March 2019
(France) Benoit Mathon	Tefana	Arue	0-6	8 March 2019
(French Polynesia) Marama Vahirua	Dragon	Taiarapu	9-2	9 March 2019
(French Polynesia) Teaonui Tehau^{4}	Vénus	Arue	0-8	22 March 2019
(French Polynesia) Marii Taurua	Tiare	Taiarapu	9-1	23 March 2019
(French Polynesia) Tefai Faehau	Vénus	Taiarapu	8-0	29 March 2019
(French Polynesia) Sandro Tau	Pirae	Tefana	2-3	5 April 2019
(French Polynesia) Marii Taurua	Tiare	Dragon	1-5	27 April 2019
(French Polynesia) Sandro Tau	Pirae	Jeunes Tahitiens	1-8	27 April 2019
(French Polynesia) Timiona Parker	Taiarapu	Jeunes Tahitiens	3-4	10 May 2019
(French Polynesia) Roonui Tinirauari	Pirae	Arue	12-1	11 May 2019
(French Polynesia) Manaraii Porlier	Tiare	Tefana	5-3	11 May 2019
(French Polynesia) Alexandre Jacq	Tefana	Taiarapu	1-6	17 May 2019
