= 2019–20 Tahiti Ligue 2 =

Tournament details
- Country: Tahiti
- Teams: 8

Final positions
- Champions: AS Excelsior
- Runners-up: AS Arue

The 2019–20 Tahiti Ligue 2 was the second highest division of the Tahitian football league. The competition is organized and administered by Fédération Tahitienne de Football.

== Participating teams ==
In the 2019–20 edition of the competition, 9 clubs were registered to play, however, only eight teams participated, after A.S. Vaiete withdrew.

- AS Excelsior
- AS Arue
- Tefana B
- AS Mataiea
- AS Tamarii Punaruu
- A.S. Taiarapu
- A.S. Papenoo
- A.S. Papara
- A.S. Vaiete (withdrew)

== Final classification ==
Class	Club	Matches	Victories	Draws	Defeats	Points	Status
1	AS Excelsior	12	9	3	0	42	Promoted
2	AS Arue	14	7	4	3	39	Promoted
3	Tefana B	14	8	1	5	39	
4	AS Mataiea	14	7	3	4	38	
5	AS Tamarii Punaruu	14	6	3	5	35	
6	AS Taiarapu	13	6	1	6	32	
7	AS Papenoo	14	3	1	10	20	
8	AS Papara FC	13	0	0	13	13	
withdrew	AS Vaiete	withdrew	withdrew	withdrew	withdrew	withdrew	withdrew
