= 2016–17 Tahiti Ligue 1 =

Tahiti Ligue 1
- Season: 2016–17
- Champions: AS Dragon
- Relegated: Arue, Olympic Mahina
- Matches played: 138
- Goals scored: 624 (4.52 per match)
- Top goalscorer: (French Polynesia) Teaonui Tehau (40 goals)
- Biggest home win: Pirae 9-1 Tahiti U17
- Biggest away win: Pirae 1-10 Vénus

The 2016–17 Tahiti Ligue 1 is the 70th season of top-flight football in Tahiti. Tefana are the defending champions having won their fourth title last season.

== League table ==
Pos	Team	Pld	W	D	L	GF	GA	GD	Pts	Qualification or relegation
1	Tefana	27	23	0	4	127	32	+95	102 (Note: Bonus points: 6 pts: AS Tefana, AS Dragon, AS Central Sport; 4 pts: AS Vénus, AS Taiarapu, AS Pirae, AS Arue, AS Olympic Mahina; 2 pts: AS Manu-Ura)	Qualification to Championship Playoff
2	Dragon	27	20	4	3	81	40	+41	97	Qualification to Championship Playoff
3	Central Sport	27	16	4	7	68	35	+33	85	Qualification to Championship Playoff
4	Vénus	27	16	5	6	82	33	+49	84	Qualification to Championship Playoff
5	Taiarapu	27	11	1	15	67	68	−1	65	
6	Pirae	27	10	1	16	63	82	−19	62	
7	Manu-Ura	27	8	6	13	34	56	−22	59	
8	Arue	27	9	1	17	39	73	−34	59	Relegation to Tahiti Ligue 2
9	Olympic Mahina	27	6	5	16	29	61	−32	54	Relegation to Tahiti Ligue 2
10	Tahiti U-17	27	2	1	24	23	133	−110	34	

Source: RSSSF
Rules for classification: 4 points for a win, 2 points for a draw, 1 point for a defeat.

== Championship playoff ==
=== Semi-finals ===
Winners qualified for 2018 OFC Champions League.

17 May 2017

AS Tefana	2–3	AS Vénus

Stade Pater, Pirae

17 May 2017

AS Dragon	2–2 (a.e.t.)	AS Central Sport
Penalties
	3–2

Stade Pater, Pirae

=== Final ===
28 May 2017

AS Vénus	0–2	AS Dragon
		Tetauira 74'; Porlier 83'

Stade Pater, Pirae

== Top scorers ==
Rank	Player	Club	Goals
1	(French Polynesia) Teaonui Tehau	Vénus	40
2	(French Polynesia) Temarii Tinorua	Tefana	18
3	(French Polynesia) Manaraii Porlier	Dragon	9
4	(French Polynesia) Jay Warren	Central Sport	8
5	(French Polynesia) Stanley Atani	Tefana	7
6	(French Polynesia) Raimana Tetuani	Taiarapu	7
7	(French Polynesia) Roonui Tze Yu	Dragon	6
8	(French Polynesia) Yohann Tihoni	Taiarapu	6
9	(French Polynesia) Jean Yves Paraue	Arue	6
10	(French Polynesia) Francois Mu	Manu Ura	6

== Hat-tricks ==
Player	For	Against	Score	Date
(French Polynesia) Teaonui Tehau^{6}	Vénus	Pirae	1-10	22 October 2016
(French Polynesia) Alvin Tehau	Tefana	Manu Ura	0-4	22 October 2016
(French Polynesia) Temarii Tinorua	Tefana	Olympic Mahina	7-1	10 September 2016
