= 2019–20 Tahiti Ligue 1 =

Tahiti Ligue 1
- Season: 2019–20
- Champions: Pirae (9th title)
- Premiers: no relegation
- OFC Champions League: Pirae; Vénus
- Matches played: 75
- Goals scored: 333 (4.44 per match)
- Top goalscorer: (French Polynesia) Sandro Tau (21 goals)

The 2019–20 Tahiti Ligue 1 is the 73rd season of the Tahiti Ligue 1, the top-flight football league in Tahiti. The season started on 27 September 2019. Vénus are the defending champions.

== Teams ==
A total of ten teams compete in the league. Arue and Taiarapu were relegated from the previous season, and were replaced by promoted teams Taravao AC and Olympique de Mahina.

- Central Sport
- Dragon
- Jeunes Tahitiens
- Manu-Ura
- Olympique de Mahina
- Pirae
- Taravao AC
- Tefana
- Tiare Tahiti
- Vénus

== League table ==
On 16 May 2020, the Tahitian Football Federation announced that the 2019–20 Tahiti Ligue 1 season had been concluded due to the COVID-19 pandemic in French Polynesia, and the remaining three rounds were cancelled. Originally, it was decided that the title would not be awarded. The top three teams of the league table (at the time of suspension on 17 March 2020) would play in a triangular play-off, with the following rules:

- The team which finished 1st in the league table would start with 3 points.
- The team which finished 2nd in the league table would start with 2 points.
- The team which finished 3rd in the league table would start with 1 point.

The top two teams of the play-off would qualify for the 2021 OFC Champions League. No teams would be relegated and the league would consist of 12 teams next season.

However, on 27 May 2020 following new consultation with the clubs, Pirae, who were leading the table, were declared champions, and qualified for the 2021 OFC Champions League together with Vénus, who were at second place. Tiare Tahiti, who were at third place, qualified for the 2020–21 Coupe de France seventh round as the representative of Tahiti (which would originally be awarded to the winners of the 2019–20 Tahiti Cup, which had also been abandoned). The decision on promotion and relegation remained the same.

Note: 4 points for a win, 2 points for a draw, 1 point for a defeat.

Pos	Team	Pld	W	D	L	GF	GA	GD	Pts	Qualification or relegation
1	Pirae (C)	15	12	2	1	66	14	+52	53	Qualification to OFC Champions League group stage
2	Vénus (Q)	15	11	2	2	52	21	+31	50	Qualification to OFC Champions League group stage
3	Tiare Tahiti (A)	15	10	3	2	47	21	+26	48	Qualification to 2020–21 Coupe de France seventh round
4	Dragon	15	7	5	3	39	29	+10	41	
5	Tefana	15	4	4	7	24	31	−7	31	
6	Manu-Ura (Note: Manu-Ura deducted 4 points.)	15	5	4	6	20	23	−3	30	
7	Taravao AC (Note: Taravao AC deducted 2 points.)	15	5	1	9	23	42	−19	29	
8	Olympique de Mahina	15	3	1	11	19	68	−49	25	
9	Central Sport	15	2	2	11	23	46	−23	23	
10	Jeunes Tahitiens (Note: Jeunes Tahitiens deducted 2 points.)	15	1	6	8	20	38	−18	22	

Updated to match(es) played on 14 March 2020. Source: FTF
(A) Advance to a further round; (C) Champions; (Q) Qualified for the phase indicated

== Top scorers ==
Rank.	Name	Team	Goal
1	(French Polynesia) Sandro Tau	Pirae	21
2	(French Polynesia) Teaonui Tehau	Vénus	20
3	(France) Benoit Mathon	Tefana	12
4	(French Polynesia) Roonui Tinirauari	Pirae	11
5	(French Polynesia) Denji Kaiha	Olympic Mahina	10
5	(French Polynesia) Tamatoa Tetauira	Vénus	10
5	(French Polynesia) Rainui Tze-Yu	Dragon	10
8	(French Polynesia) Yohann Tihoni	Pueu	9
9	(French Polynesia) Jess Horoi	Central Sport	8
10	(French Polynesia) Raiamanu Tetauira	Dragon	7

== Hat-tricks ==
Player	For	Against	Score	Date
(French Polynesia) Sandro Tau^{5}	Pirae	Taravao	11-0	19 October 2019
(French Polynesia) Roonui Tinirauari	Pirae	Taravao	11-0	19 October 2019
(French Polynesia) Kevin Scharwitzel^{4}	Dragon	Olympic Mahina	3-9	31 October 2019
(France) Benoit Mathon	Tefana	Tiare	4-2	30 November 2019
(French Polynesia) Sandro Tau^{5}	Pirae	Olympic Mahina	11-1	7 December 2019
(French Polynesia) Denji Kaiha^{4}	Olympic Mahina	Tefana	4-3	13 December 2019
(French Polynesia) Tauhiti Keck	Vénus	Olympic Mahina	0-8	17 January 2020
(French Polynesia) Teaonui Tehau^{4}	Vénus	Olympic Mahina	0-8	17 January 2020
(French Polynesia) Teaonui Tehau	Vénus	Pirae	4-0	21 January 2020
(French Polynesia) Christopher Tiatia-Ohotoua	Manu-Ura	Olympic Mahina	2-5	14 February 2020
(French Polynesia) Roonui Tinirauari^{4}	Pirae	Central Sport	6-0	15 February 2020
(French Polynesia) Ariiura Labaste	Vénus	Central Sport	7-4	13 March 2020
(French Polynesia) Jess Horoi^{4}	Central Sport	Vénus	7-4	13 March 2020

== See also ==
- 2019–20 Tahiti Cup
