= Tahiti Cup =

- Founded: 1938
- Country: Tahiti
- Confederation: OFC
- Number of clubs: Various
- International cup: Coupe de France
- Current champions: Dragon (7th title); 2023–24
- Most championships: AS Central Sport (18 titles)
- Top scorer: (French Polynesia) Teaonui Tehau (+50 goals)
- Website: www.ftf.pf
- Current: 2024–25 Tahiti Cup

The Tahiti Cup (also known as Coupe de Polynésie or Coupe de Tahiti Nui) is the premier football knockout tournament in French Polynesia. It was created in 1938, and gives the winner of the tournament a berth in the Coupe de France.

Between 2001 and 2006 two cup competitions were held in parallel.

== List of Winners Coupe de Polynésie / Coupe de Tahiti Nui ==
- 1938: Marine
- 1945: CAICT
- 1946: Fei Pi
- 1947: Fei Pi
- 1948: Fei Pi
- 1949: Fei Pi
- 1950: Central Sport
- 1951: Jeunes Tahitiens
- 1952: Vénus
- 1953: Central Sport
- 1954: Central Sport
- 1955: Fei Pi
- 1956: Fei Pi
- 1957: Central Sport
- 1958: Fei Pi
- 1959: Fei Pi
- 1960: Excelsior
- 1961: Central Sport
- 1962: Central Sport
- 1963: Excelsior
- 1964: Excelsior
- 1965: Excelsior
- 1966: Central Sport
- 1967: Central Sport
- 1968: Tamarii Punaruu
- 1969: Tamarii Punaruu
- 1970: Arue
- 1971: Jeunes Tahitiens
- 1972: Central Sport
- 1973: Central Sport
- 1974: Vaiete
- 1975: Central Sport
- 1976: Central Sport
- 1977: Central Sport
- 1978: Pirae
- 1979: Central Sport
- 1980: Pirae
- 1981: Central Sport
- 1982: Jeunes Tahitiens
- 1983: Central Sport
- 1984: Pirae
- 1985: PTT
- 1986: PTT
- 1987: Jeunes Tahitiens
- 1988: Central Sport
- 1989: Jeunes Tahitiens
- 1990: Vénus
- 1991: Vénus
- 1992: Vénus
- 1994: Pirae
- 1995: Central Sport
- 1996: Pirae
- 1997: Dragon
- 1998: Vénus
- 1999: Vénus
- 2000: Pirae
- 2001: Dragon
- 2002: Pirae
- 2003: Manu-Ura
- 2004: Dragon
- 2005: Pirae
- 2006: Temanava
- 2007: Tefana
- 2008: Tefana
- 2009: Manu-Ura
- 2010: Tefana
- 2011: Tefana
- 2012: Tefana
- 2013: Dragon
- 2014: Tefana
- 2015: Pirae
- 2016: Dragon
- 2017: Tefana
- 2018: Dragon
- 2019: Vénus
- 2020: abandoned due to COVID-19
- 2021: Vénus
- 2022: Vénus
- 2023: Pirae
- 2024: Dragon

== List of Winners Coupe de Tahiti ==
- 2001: Vénus
- 2002: Not Known
- 2003: Not Known
- 2004: Tefana
- 2005: Manu-Ura
- 2006: Tefana

== Performances ==
=== Performances by club ===
Club	Winners Coupe de Polynésie	Winners Coupe de Tahiti
Central Sport	18	—
Pirae	10	—
Vénus	9	1
As Fei Pi	8	-
Tefana	7	2
Dragon	7	—
Jeunes Tahitiens	5	—
Excelsior	4	—
Manu-Ura	2	1
AS PTT	2	—
Tamarii Punaruu	2	—
Temanava	1	—
AS Vaiete	1	—
Arue	1	—
CAICT	1	—
Marine	1	—

== Top goalscorers ==
Season	Name	Team	Goals
2016–17	(French Polynesia) Marii Taurua	Temanava	9
2017-18	(French Polynesia) Teaonui Tehau	Vénus	10
2018–19	(French Polynesia) Teaonui Tehau	Vénus	11
2019–20	(French Polynesia) Teaonui Tehau	Vénus	8
2019–20	(French Polynesia) Patrick Tepa	Pirae	8
2019–20	(French Polynesia) Roonui Tinirauarii	Pirae	8
2020–21	(French Polynesia) Teaonui Tehau	Vénus	7
2020–21	(French Polynesia) Yohann Tihoni	Pueu	7
2021–22	(French Polynesia) Roonui Tinirauarii	Dragon	8
2021–22	(French Polynesia) Teaonui Tehau	Vénus	8
2022–23	(France) Benoit Mathon	Pirae	7
2023–24	(French Polynesia) Freddy Tutavae	Mira	6
2024-25	(French Polynesia) Rainui Tze-Yu	Tohie'a	5
2024-25	(French Polynesia) Owen Teiri	Taiarapu	5
2024-25	(French Polynesia) Anuhea Arapari	Tamarii Tapuhute	5

Most goals in a single season

- 11 goals:
  - Teaonui Tehau (2018–19).

Most goals in a single game

- 8 goals:
  - Marii Taurua (Temanava) 1–13 against Teva, round of 16, season 2016–17.

== Multiple hat-tricks ==
Player	For	Against	Score	Date
(French Polynesia) Rainui Tze-Yu	Dragon	Olympic Mahina	0–3	11 November 2015
(French Polynesia) Manaraii Porlier	Dragon	Venus	2–3	18 March 2016
(French Polynesia) Andre Teikihakaupoko	Aorai	Papara	5–1	5 November 2016
(French Polynesia) Tevairoa Tehuritaua	Tiare	Excelsior	5–0	6 November 2016
(French Polynesia) Marii Taurua^{8}	Temanava	Teva	1–13	14 February 2017
(French Polynesia) Teaonui Tehau^{5}	Vénus	Aorai	0-5	27 October 2017
(French Polynesia) Teaonui Tehau	Vénus	Tefana	5–5	12 May 2018
(French Polynesia) Tunoa Tevaearai	Tefana	Punaruu	1–8	9 November 2018
(French Polynesia) Timiona Parker	Taiarapu	Excelsior	1–3	10 November 2018
(French Polynesia) Teaonui Tehau	Vénus	Central Sport	3–0	10 November 2018
(French Polynesia) Tauhiti Keck	Temanava	Dragon	3–2	5 March 2019
(France) Benoit Mathon	Tefana	Arue	7–1	16 March 2019
(French Polynesia) Teaonui Tehau^{4}	Vénus	Temanava	8–2	16 March 2019
(French Polynesia) Raimana Li Fung Kuee	Pirae	Mira	6–3	16 March 2019
(French Polynesia) Teaonui Tehau	Vénus	Tefana	3–0	14 September 2019
(French Polynesia) Teaonui Tehau	Vénus	Taiarapu	0–6	8 November 2019
(French Polynesia) Pou Mark Varuamana	Tohie'a	Olympic Mahina	4–2	11 November 2019
(French Polynesia) Patrick Tepa^{6}	Pirae	Papara	0–23	17 December 2019
(French Polynesia) Gervais Chan Kat^{4}	Pirae	Papara	0–23	17 December 2019
(French Polynesia) Roonui Tinirauari^{7}	Pirae	Papara	0–23	17 December 2019
(French Polynesia) Fred Tissot	Central Sport	Mahitoa	1–11	11 January 2020
(French Polynesia) Jess Horoi	Central Sport	Mahitoa	1–11	11 January 2020
(French Polynesia) Teaonui Tehau^{5}	Vénus	Tohie'a	10–0	19 February 2020
(French Polynesia) Yohann Tihoni^{6}	Pueu	Tiare Anani	1–7	10 Apríl 2021
(French Polynesia) Francois Mu	Dragon	Manu Ura	7–4	10 Apríl 2021
(French Polynesia) Matatia Paama	Manu Ura	Dragon	7–4	10 Apríl 2021
(French Polynesia) Timiona Parker	Taiarapu	Papara	5–1	10 Apríl 2021
(French Polynesia) Teaonui Tehau	Vénus	Punaruu	3–1	19 June 2021
(French Polynesia) Roinui Tinirauari	Dragon	Excelsior	0–8	14 Apríl 2022
(French Polynesia) Matatia Paama	Pirae	Tefana	4–1	6 May 2022
(French Polynesia) Mauna Teikituhaahaa^{4}	Pueu	Vaitete	11–0	6 May 2022
(French Polynesia) Raimana Tetuanui^{4}	Pueu	Vaitete	11–0	6 May 2022
(French Polynesia) Samuel Hnanyine	Dragon	Tiare Anani	1–8	7 May 2022
(French Polynesia) Teaonui Tehau	Vénus	Samine	5–0	7 May 2022
(French Polynesia) Roonui Tinirauari^{4}	Dragon	Taiarapu	0–8	2 July 2022
(French Polynesia) Francois Mu	Dragon	Taiarapu	0–8	2 July 2022
(New Caledonia) Allan Hnyeikone^{4}	Central Sport	Arue	10–1	10 February 2023
(French Polynesia) Kavai'ei Morgant^{5}	Tefana	Samine	2–7	11 February 2023
(France) Benoit Mathon^{7}	Pirae	Team Mato	0–17	11 February 2023
(French Polynesia) Sandro Tau	Pirae	Team Mato	0–17	11 February 2023
(French Polynesia) Heirauarii Sálem	Pirae	Team Mato	0–17	11 February 2023
(French Polynesia) Levy Tuhariua	Papenoo	Mira	2–4	12 February 2023
(French Polynesia) Manaraii Porlier^{5}	Tiare Tahiti	Tiare Anani	8–0	12 February 2023
(French Polynesia) Teaonui Tehau	Faehiri	Vénus	0–4	18 February 2023
(French Polynesia) Honoura Maraerenga	Tefana	Hitia'a	13–0	6 April 2023
(French Polynesia) Teikiu Ah Sam	Tefana	Hitia'a	13–0	6 April 2023
(French Polynesia) Kevin Osei	Tefana	Hitia'a	13–0	6 April 2023
(French Polynesia) Junior Tiaoao	Tapuhute	TFC	2–4	8 April 2023
(French Polynesia) Tarepa Ferrand	Tohie'a	Papenoo	1–3	8 April 2023
(French Polynesia) Yohann Tihoni^{5}	Pirae	Feahiri	1–10	17 February 2024
(French Polynesia) Freddy Tutavae^{4}	Mira	Arue	11–2	17 February 2024
(French Polynesia) Albert Mairau^{4}	Tiare Hinano	Mataiea	17–0	17 February 2024
(French Polynesia) Tauatua Lucas	Tefana	Samine	1–9	17 February 2024
(French Polynesia) Nehemia Taaviri	Mira	Papenoo	9–0	8 May 2024
(French Polynesia) Teiki Vše a	Tiare Hinano	Punaruu	3–2	25 May 2024
(French Polynesia) Roonui Tinirauarii	Dragon	Tiare Hinano	1–4	1 June 2024
(French Polynesia) Rainui Tze-Yu^{5}	Tohie'a	Papenoo	1-7	13 February 2025
(New Caledonia) Makalu Xowi	Dragon	Terapu	0-6	15 February 2025
(French Polynesia) Robert Ah Sam	Dragon	Faehiri	1-11	1 March 2025
(French Polynesia) Anuhea Arapari	Punaruu	Tapuhute	10-0	15 March 2025
(French Polynesia) Maitere Tanerii	Central Sport	Taiarapu	4-3	15 March 2025
(French Polynesia) Theophile Marirai	Tamarii Temanava	Pirae	8-4	7 June 2025

Most hat-tricks in a single season

- 13 hat-tricks (2022–23)

Most hat-tricks in a single game

- 3 hat-tricks:
  - Papara 0–23 Pirae (2019–20)
  - Team Mato 0–17 Pirae (2022–23)
  - Tefana 13–0 Hitia'a (2022–23)

=== All–time multiple hat-tricks ===
Rank	Country	Player	hat-tricks
1	(French Polynesia)	Teaonui Tehau	10
2	(French Polynesia)	Roonui Tinirauari	5
3	(French Polynesia)	Manaraii Porlier	3
4	(France)	Benoit Mathon	2
4	(French Polynesia)	Francois Mu	2
4	(French Polynesia)	Matatia Paama	2
4	(French Polynesia)	Timiona Parker	2
4	(French Polynesia)	Maitere Tenerii	2
4	(French Polynesia)	Yohann Tihoni	2
4	(French Polynesia)	Rainui Tze-Yu	2
42 players			1

== See also ==
- Tahiti Ligue 1
- Tahiti Coupe des Champions
