= Tahiti Ligue 1 =

- Founded: 1948
- Country: Tahiti
- Confederation: OFC
- Number of clubs: 10
- Level on pyramid: 1
- Relegation to: Ligue 2
- Domestic cup(s): Tahiti Cup; Tahiti Coupe des Champions
- International cup: OFC Champions League
- Current champions: AS Venus (11th title) (2024–25)
- Most championships: AS Central Sport (21 titles)
- Top scorer: (French Polynesia) Teaonui Tehau (376 goals)
- Website: www.ftf.pf
- Current: 2026–27 Tahiti Ligue 1

The Tahiti Ligue 1 is the top division of the Fédération Tahitienne de Football in French Polynesia. The league is currently named Ligue 1 Vini for sponsorship reasons.

== Competition format ==
The competition is divided into a regular season and play-offs. The regular season is a league format. At the end of the regular season the top six teams – and in past seasons the winners of the Moorea island league – enter a play-off league to determine the overall champions and qualifiers for the OFC Champions League. Meanwhile, the lower teams enter a separate play-off league along with teams from Ligue 2 to determine promotion and relegation for the following season.

The league has a point scoring system whereby teams are awarded 4 points for a win, 2 points for a draw and 1 point for a defeat. The only way a team cannot score a point is by failing to field a team. Although it is not unique, and is inspired from the French ranking system for every division below the third tier, as well as the women's league (all before 2016), it has received publicity when the Tahiti national football team qualified for the Confederations Cup. According to an interview with Charles Ariitoma, the President of the FTF, this was introduced because "we don't want anyone to be sad".

== Teams ==
These are the teams for the 2024–25 Tahiti Ligue 1 season:

- Central Sport
- Dragon
- Manu-Ura
- Mira
- Pirae
- Pueu
- Taiarapu
- Tamarii Punaruu
- Tefana
- Vénus

== List of champions ==
Champions so far are:

- 1948: AS Fei Pi (Papeete)
- 1949: AS Fei Pi (Papeete)
- 1950: AS Fei Pi (Papeete)
- 1951: AS Fei Pi (Papeete)
- 1952: AS Excelsior (Papeete)
- 1953: AS Vénus (Mahina)
- 1954: AS Jeunes Tahitiens (Papeete)
- 1955: AS Central Sport (Papeete)
- 1956: AS Excelsior (Papeete)
- 1957: AS Excelsior (Papeete)
- 1958: AS Central Sport (Papeete)
- 1959: AS Excelsior (Papeete)
- 1960: AS Excelsior (Papeete)
- 1961: AS Jeunes Tahitiens (Papeete)
- 1962: AS Central Sport (Papeete)
- 1963: AS Central Sport (Papeete)
- 1964: AS Central Sport (Papeete)
- 1965: AS Central Sport (Papeete)
- 1966: AS Central Sport (Papeete)
- 1967: AS Central Sport (Papeete)
- 1968: AS Fei Pi (Papeete)
- 1969: AS Tamarii Punaruu (Papeete)
- 1970: AS Fei Pi (Papeete)
- 1971: AS Fei Pi (Papeete)
- 1972: AS Central Sport (Papeete)
- 1973: AS Central Sport (Papeete)
- 1974: AS Central Sport (Papeete)
- 1975: AS Central Sport (Papeete)
- 1976: AS Central Sport (Papeete)
- 1977: AS Central Sport (Papeete)
- 1978: AS Central Sport (Papeete)
- 1979: AS Central Sport (Papeete)
- 1980: AS Arue (Arue)
- 1981: AS Central Sport (Papeete)
- 1982: AS Central Sport (Papeete)
- 1983: AS Central Sport (Papeete)
- 1984: AS PTT (Papeete)
- 1985: AS Central Sport (Papeete)
- 1986: AS Excelsior (Papeete)
- 1987: AS Jeunes Tahitiens (Papeete)
- 1988: AS Excelsior (Papeete)
- 1989: AS Pirae (Pirae)
- 1990: AS Vénus (Mahina)
- 1991: AS Pirae (Pirae)
- 1992: AS Vénus (Mahina)
- 1993: AS Pirae (Pirae)
- 1994: AS Pirae (Pirae)
- 1995: AS Vénus (Mahina)
- 1996: AS Manu-Ura (Papeete)
- 1997: AS Vénus (Mahina)
- 1998: AS Vénus (Mahina)
- 1999: AS Vénus (Mahina)
- 2000: AS Vénus (Mahina)
- 2001: AS Pirae (Pirae)
- 2002: AS Vénus (Mahina)
- 2003: AS Pirae (Pirae)
- 2004: AS Manu-Ura (Papeete)
- 2005: AS Tefana (Faa'a)
- 2005–06: AS Pirae (Pirae)
- 2006–07: AS Manu-Ura (Papeete)
- 2007–08: AS Manu-Ura (Papeete)
- 2008–09: AS Manu-Ura (Papeete)
- 2009–10: AS Tefana (Faa'a)
- 2010–11: AS Tefana (Faa'a)
- 2011–12: AS Dragon (Papeete)
- 2012–13: AS Dragon (Papeete)
- 2013–14: AS Pirae (Pirae)
- 2014–15: AS Tefana (Faa'a)
- 2015–16: AS Tefana (Faa'a)
- 2016–17: AS Dragon (Papeete)
- 2017–18: AS Central Sport (Papeete)
- 2018–19: AS Vénus (Mahina)
- 2019–20: AS Pirae (Pirae)
- 2020–21: AS Pirae (Pirae)
- 2021–22: AS Pirae (Pirae)
- 2022–23: AS Tefana (Faa'a)
- 2023–24: AS Pirae (Pirae)
- 2024–25: AS Vénus (Mahina)
- 2025–26:
- 2026–27:

== Performances ==
=== Performances by club ===
Club	Winners
AS Central Sport	21
AS Pirae	12
AS Vénus	11
AS Excelsior	7
AS Fei Pi	7
AS Tefana	6
AS Manu-Ura	5
AS Jeunes Tahitiens	3
AS Dragon	3
AS Arue	1
AS PPT	1
AS Tamarii Punaruu	1

=== Performances by city ===
City / Town	Winners	Winning Clubs
Papeete	47	AS Central Sport (20), AS Excelsior (7), AS Fei Pi (7), AS Manu-Ura (5), AS Jeunes Tahitiens (3), AS Dragon (3), AS PPT (1), AS Tamarii Punaruu (1)
Pirae	12	AS Pirae (12)
Mahina	11	AS Vénus (11)
Faaa	6	AS Tefana (6)
Arue	1	AS Arue (1)

== Top goalscorers ==
Season	Best scorers	Team	Goals
2001–02	(New Caledonia) Michel Hmaé	Pirae	23
2002–03	(New Caledonia) Ramon Djamali	Manu–Ura	22
2003–04	(French Polynesia) Naea Bennett	Pirae	19
2006–07	(French Polynesia) Naea Bennett	Pirae	24
2007–08	(French Polynesia) Raimana Li Fung Kuee	Manu Ura	15
2008–09	(French Polynesia) Auguste Washetine	Manu Ura	9
2011–12	(French Polynesia) Steevy Chong Hue	Dragon	12
2013–14	(French Polynesia) Teaonui Tehau	Vénus	25
2014–15	(French Polynesia) Raimana Li Fung Kuee	Pirae	30
2015–16	(French Polynesia) Temarii Tinorua	Tefana	27
2016–17	(French Polynesia) Teaonui Tehau	Vénus	40
2017–18	(French Polynesia) Teaonui Tehau	Vénus	53
2018–19	(French Polynesia) Teaonui Tehau	Vénus	42
2019–20	(French Polynesia) Sandro Tau	Pirae	21
2020–21	(French Polynesia) Teaonui Tehau	Vénus	27
2021–22	(French Polynesia) Teaonui Tehau	Vénus	42
2022–23	(French Polynesia) Roonui Tinirauarii	Dragon	45
2023–24	(French Polynesia) Roonui Tinirauarii	Dragon	36
2024–25	(French Polynesia) Eddy Kaspard	Vénus	37
2025-26	(French Polynesia) Roonui Tinirauarii	Dragon	41
2026-27	(French Polynesia) Roonui Tinirauarii	Dragon	18

Most time goalscorers

- 6 times
  - Teaonui Tehau (2013–14, 2016–17, 2017–18, 2018–19, 2020–21, 2021–22)

Most goals by a player in a single game

- 13 goals
  - Sandro Tau (Pirae), 0–22 against Papenoo, round 9, season 2023–24.

Most goals by a player in a single season

- 53 goals
  - Teaonui Tehau, (2017–18).

=== All-time goalscorers ===
Rank	Country	Player	Goals	Years
1	(French Polynesia)	Teaonui Tehau	376	2008-
2	(French Polynesia)	Roonui Tinirauarii	196	2015
3	(French Polynesia)	Sandro Tau	155	2015
4	(New Caledonia)	Makalu Xowi	138	2021
5	(French Polynesia)	Tamatoa Tetauira	115	2017
6	(France)	Benoit Mathon	103	2018

=== Multiple hat-tricks ===
Rank	Country	Player	Hat-tricks
1	(French Polynesia)	Teaonui Tehau	40
2	(French Polynesia)	Roonui Tinirauarii	31
3	(French Polynesia)	Sandro Tau	21
4	(New Caledonia)	Makalu Xowi	18
5	(France)	Benoit Mathon	15
5	(French Polynesia)	Tamatoa Tetauira	15
7	(French Polynesia)	Francois Mu	12
8	(French Polynesia)	Frank Papaura	9
8	(French Polynesia)	Rainui Tze-Yu	9
10	(French Polynesia)	Yohann Tihoni	8
11	(French Polynesia)	Timiona Parker	7

Most hat–tricks in a single season

- 53 hat–tricks (2026–27)

Most hat-tricks by a scorer in a single season

- 10 hat–tricks:
  - Teaonui Tehau (2017–18)

== D1 Féminine ==
=== Top goalscorers ===
Season	Player	Team	Goals
2022-23	(French Polynesia) Leao L. Kergal		26
2024-25	(French Polynesia) Mai kohai	Pirae	24
