= A.S. Vénus =

Tahitian football club

AS Vénus
- Full name: Association Sportive Vénus
- Nickname: The Blues
- Founded: 1945; 81 years ago
- Ground: Stade Municipal de Mahina; Mahina, French Polynesia
- Capacity: 1,000
- Chairman: Michel Paille
- League: Tahiti Ligue 1
Home colours	Away colours

AS Vénus is a professional football club from Mahina, on the Tahiti island of French Polynesia. They play in the Tahiti First Division. They play home games at Stade Municipal de Mahina. The club have a partnership with metropolitan giants AS Saint-Étienne.

== Honours ==
Tahiti First Division

- Champions (11): 1953, 1990, 1992, 1995, 1997, 1998, 1999, 2000, 2002, 2018–19, 2024–25

Tahiti Cup

- Winners (9): 1952, 1990, 1991, 1992, 1998, 1999, 2019, 2021, 2022.

Tahiti Coupe des Champions

- Winners (2): 1995, 1999.

Coupe T.O.M.

- Winners (5): 1997, 1998, 1999, 2000, 2002

Outremer Champions Cup

- Winners: 1999

== Recent seasons ==
Season	League/position
2012–13	6th in Ligue 1. Quarter-finals of Tahiti Cup.
2013–14	4th in Ligue 1; championship semi-finals. Semi-finals of Tahiti Cup.
2014–15	7th in Ligue 1.
2015–16	3rd in Ligue 1. 2015-16 Tahiti Cup runners-up.
2016–17	4th in Ligue 1 (championship stage runners-up). Qualified to OFC Champions League. 2016-17 Tahiti Cup quarter-finalists.
2017–18	5th in Ligue 1. Group stage at OFC Champions League. 2017-18 Tahiti Cup runners-up.
2018–19	1st in Ligue 1. Qualified to OFC Champions League. 2018-19 Tahiti Cup champions.
2019–20	2nd in Ligue 1. Qualified to 2021 OFC Champions League. Knock-out stage of 2020 OFC Champions League. Seventh round of Coupe de France. 2019-20 Tahiti Cup semi-finalists.
2020–21	2nd in Ligue 1. Qualified to 2022 OFC Champions League. 2020-21 Tahiti Cup champions.
2021–22	3rd in Ligue 1. Runners-up at OFC Champions League.

== Continental record ==
OFC Men's Champions League results
Season	Round	Club	Home	Away	Aggregate

Season	Round	Club	Result
1999	Group B	(Fiji) Nadi F.C.	1–1
1999	Group B	(Samoa) Kiwi F.C.	14–1
1999	Semifinal	(Australia) South Melbourne	0–3
2001	Group B	(American Samoa) PanSa	2–0
2001	Group B	(Samoa) Titavi FC	6–0
2001	Group B	(Cook Islands) Tupapa Maraerenga	10–1
2001	Group B	(Vanuatu) Tafea	0–6
2001	Semifinal	(Australia) Wollongong Wolves	2–4
2001	3rd Place	(New Zealand) Napier City Rovers	2–3
2018	Group C	(New Zealand) Auckland City FC	0–7
2018	Group C	(Fiji) Lautoka F.C.	1–2
2018	Group C	(Papua New Guinea) Madang FC	2–1
2020	Group C	(Samoa) Lupe o le Soaga	6–0
2020	Group C	(New Zealand) Auckland City FC	0–1
2020	Group C	(Fiji) Ba	4–2
2022	Group A	(Solomon Islands) Central Coast	3–0
2022	Group A	(Papua New Guinea) Lae City	1–0
2022	Group A	(Vanuatu) ABM Galaxy	0–1
2022	Semifinal	(New Caledonia) Hienghène Sport	4–0
2022	Final	(New Zealand) Auckland City FC	0–3

== Historic goalscorer ==
Teaonui Tehau
Detail	Tahiti League	Tahiti Cup	Trophée des Champions	OFC Champions League	Total
Goals	369	51	3	10	433
Hat-tricks	40	10	0	2	52
Scorer	6	3	1	1	11

== See also ==
- Tahiti United FC
