= Teaonui Tehau =

Tahitian footballer (born 1992)

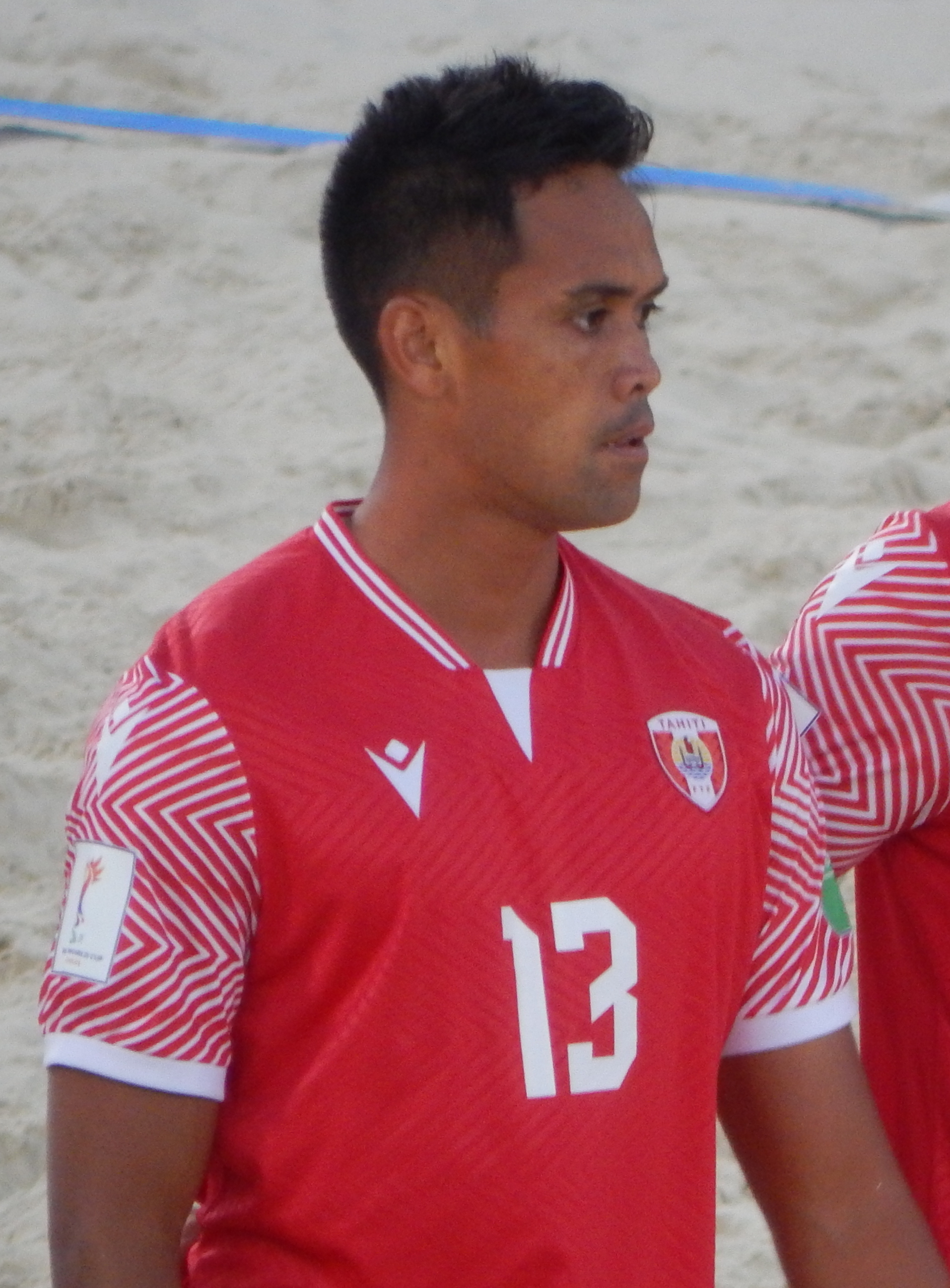
- Tehau playing for Tahiti at the 2021 FIFA Beach Soccer World Cup

Personal information
- Full name: Teaonui Raymond Tehau
- Date of birth: 1 September 1992 (age 34)
- Place of birth: Faʻaʻā, Tahiti
- Height: 1.75 m (5 ft 9 in)
- Position: Forward

Team information
- Current team: Tahiti United
- Number: 10

Senior career*
Years	Team	Apps	(Gls)
2008–2009	Tahiti U20	6	(1)
2009-	Vénus	252	(369)
2012–2014	→ Dragon (loan)	18	(5)
2014–2015	→ Pirae (loan)	13	(1)
2026–	Tahiti United	16	(7)

International career^{‡}
2009	Tahiti U20	3	(0)
2011–	Tahiti	52	(32)
Medal record
Men's football
Representing Tahiti
OFC Nations Cup
Winner	2012 Solomon Islands
Third place	2024 Fiji/Vanuatu
Pacific Games
Bronze medal – third place	2011 New Caledonia
Men's Beach soccer
Representing Tahiti
OFC Beach Soccer Nations Cup
Winner	2019 Tahiti
Winner	2023 Tahiti
- * Club domestic league appearances and goals ‡ National team caps and goals as of 16 November 2026

Teaonui Raymond Tehau (born 1 September 1992) is a Tahitian professional footballer who plays as a forward for and captains both OFC Professional League club Tahiti United and the Tahiti national football team. He is the cousin of the brothers Alvin Tehau, Lorenzo Tehau and Jonathan Tehau, all of them playing for Tahiti.

== International career ==
He has represented Tahiti at both junior and senior level. He was also part of the history making 2012 OFC Nations Cup squad which won the tournament.

== Career statistics ==
=== Club ===
Appearances and goals by club, season and competition
Club	Season	League			Cup		Continental		Other		Total	
Club	Season	Division	Apps	Goals	Apps	Goals	Apps	Goals	Apps	Goals	Apps	Goals
Tahiti U20	2008–09	Tahiti Ligue 1	6	1	2	1	–		–		8	2
Vénus	2009–10	Tahiti Ligue 1					–		–			
Vénus	2010–11	Tahiti Ligue 1					–		–			
Vénus	2011–12	Tahiti Ligue 1					–		–			
Vénus	2013–14	Tahiti Ligue 1	18	25			–		–		18	25
Vénus	2014–15	Tahiti Ligue 1	7	3			–		–		7	3
Vénus	2015–16	Tahiti Ligue 1	8	13	1	1	–		–		9	14
Vénus	2016–17	Tahiti Ligue 1	27	40	2	0	–		–		29	40
Vénus	2017–18	Tahiti Ligue 1	27	53	3	10	3 (Note: Appearances in OFC Champions League)	2	–		33	65
Vénus	2018–19	Tahiti Ligue 1	27	42	4	11	–		1	0	32	53
Vénus	2019–20	Tahiti Ligue 1	15	20	3	8	3	4	1	0	22	32
Vénus	2020–21	Tahiti Ligue 1	18	27	5	7	–		–		23	34
Vénus	2021–22	Tahiti Ligue 1	22	42	5	8	5	4	2	2	34	56
Vénus	2022–23	Tahiti Ligue 1	21	38	3	4	–		1	0	25	42
Vénus	2023–24	Tahiti Ligue 1	18	23	2	1	–		–		20	24
Vénus	2024–25	Tahiti Ligue 1	28	25	3	1	–		–		31	26
Vénus	2025–26	Tahiti Ligue 1	7	4			–		1	1	8	5
Vénus	2026-27	Tahiti Ligue 1	7	14							7	14
Vénus	Total		252	369	31	51	11	10	6	3	301	433
Dragon (loan)	2012–13	Tahiti Ligue 1	18	5			6	4			24	9
Dragon (loan)	2013–14	Tahiti Ligue 1	–		–		3	1	–		3	1
Dragon (loan)	Total		18	5			9	5			27	10
Pirae (loan)	2014–15	Tahiti Ligue 1	13	1			3	1			16	2
Tahiti United	2026	–			–		16 (Note: Appearances in OFC Professional League)	7	–		16	7
Tahiti United	2027	–			–		0	0	–		0	0
Tahiti United	Total		0	0	0	0	16	7	0	0	16	7
Career total			289	376	33	52	39	23	6	3	367	454

=== International ===
As of match played 16 November 2026

Appearances and goals by national team and year
National team	Year	Apps	Goals
Tahiti	2011	5	6
Tahiti	2012	9	2
Tahiti	2013	3	0
Tahiti	2016	5	4
Tahiti	2017	2	1
Tahiti	2018	2	3
Tahiti	2019	5	8
Tahiti	2022	2	0
Tahiti	2023	7	3
Tahiti	2024	8	4
Tahiti	2025	1	0
Tahiti	2026	3	1
Total		52	32

Scores and results list Tahiti's goal tally first, score column indicates score after each Tehau goal.

List of international goals scored by Teaonui Tehau
No.	Date	Venue	Opponent	Score	Result	Competition	Ref.
1	5 September 2011	Stade Boewa, Boulari Bay, New Caledonia	Kiribati	10–1	17–1	2011 Pacific Games	
2	5 September 2011	Stade Boewa, Boulari Bay, New Caledonia	Kiribati	11–1	17–1	2011 Pacific Games	
3	5 September 2011	Stade Boewa, Boulari Bay, New Caledonia	Kiribati	13–1	17–1	2011 Pacific Games	
4	5 September 2011	Stade Boewa, Boulari Bay, New Caledonia	Kiribati	15–1	17–1	2011 Pacific Games	
5	5 September 2011	Stade Boewa, Boulari Bay, New Caledonia	Kiribati	16–1	17–1	2011 Pacific Games	
6	5 September 2011	Stade Boewa, Boulari Bay, New Caledonia	Kiribati	17–1	17–1	2011 Pacific Games	
7	1 June 2012	Lawson Tama Stadium, Honiara, Solomon Islands	Samoa	5–0	10–1	2012 OFC Nations Cup	
8	5 June 2012	Lawson Tama Stadium, Honiara, Solomon Islands	Vanuatu	4–0	4–1	2012 OFC Nations Cup	
9	29 April 2016	Sir John Guise Stadium, Port Moresby, Papua New Guinea	Samoa	1–0	4–0	2016 OFC Nations Cup	
10	29 April 2016	Sir John Guise Stadium, Port Moresby, Papua New Guinea	Samoa	2–0	4–0	2016 OFC Nations Cup	
11	1 June 2016	Sir John Guise Stadium, Port Moresby, Papua New Guinea	Papua New Guinea	2–2	2–2	2016 OFC Nations Cup	
12	5 June 2016	Sir John Guise Stadium, Port Moresby, Papua New Guinea	New Caledonia	1–1	1–1	2016 OFC Nations Cup	
13	23 March 2017	Sir John Guise Stadium, Port Moresby, Papua New Guinea	Papua New Guinea	3–1	3–1	2018 FIFA World Cup qualification	
14	23 March 2018	Stade Pater, Pīraʻe, Tahiti	New Caledonia	2–2	4–3	Friendly	
15	23 March 2018	Stade Pater, Pīraʻe, Tahiti	New Caledonia	3–2	4–3	Friendly	
16	23 March 2018	Stade Pater, Pīraʻe, Tahiti	New Caledonia	4–3	4–3	Friendly	
17	10 July 2019	National Soccer Stadium, Apia, Samoa	Tuvalu	1–0	7–0	2019 Pacific Games	
18	10 July 2019	National Soccer Stadium, Apia, Samoa	Tuvalu	2–0	7–0	2019 Pacific Games	
19	10 July 2019	National Soccer Stadium, Apia, Samoa	Tuvalu	5–0	7–0	2019 Pacific Games	
20	12 July 2019	National Soccer Stadium, Apia, Samoa	Solomon Islands	2–0	3–0	2019 Pacific Games	
21	12 July 2019	National Soccer Stadium, Apia, Samoa	Solomon Islands	3–0	3–0	2019 Pacific Games	
22	18 July 2019	National Soccer Stadium, Apia, Samoa	American Samoa	1–0	8–1	2019 Pacific Games	
23	18 July 2019	National Soccer Stadium, Apia, Samoa	American Samoa	5–1	8–1	2019 Pacific Games	
24	18 July 2019	National Soccer Stadium, Apia, Samoa	American Samoa	6–1	8–1	2019 Pacific Games	
25	24 November 2023	SIFF Academy Field, Honiara, Solomon Islands	Northern Mariana Islands	1–0	5–0	2023 Pacific Games	
26	24 November 2023	SIFF Academy Field, Honiara, Solomon Islands	Northern Mariana Islands	2–0	5–0	2023 Pacific Games	
27	30 November 2023	SIFF Academy Field, Honiara, Solomon Islands	Papua New Guinea	2–0	2–0	2023 Pacific Games	
28	16 June 2024	HFC Bank Stadium, Suva, Fiji	Samoa	2–0	2–0	2024 OFC Nations Cup	
29	30 June 2024	Freshwater Stadium, Port Vila, Vanuatu	Fiji	1–1	2–1	2024 OFC Nations Cup	
30	30 June 2024	Freshwater Stadium, Port Vila, Vanuatu	Fiji	2–1	2–1	2024 OFC Nations Cup	
31	15 November 2024	Waikato Stadium, Hamilton, New Zealand	Samoa	3–0	3–0	2026 FIFA World Cup qualification	
32	16 November 2026	Stade Louis Ganivet, Faʼaʼā, Tahití	Cook Islands	3–2	3–3	Friendly match	

== Honours ==
Tahiti

- OFC Nations Cup: 2012; 3rd place, 2024
- Pacific Games: Bronze Medalist, 2011
- OFC Beach Soccer Nations Cup: 2019, 2023

Individual

- IFFHS OFC Men's Team of the Decade 2011–2020
- Topscorer Champions League:
  - 1 (2022)
- Topscorer Ligue 1:
  - 6 (2013–14, 2016–17, 2017–18, 2018–19, 2020–21, 2021–22)
- Topscorer Tahiti Cup:
  - 2
- OFC Professional League Team of the Season: 2026 (substitute)
