= A.S. Vaiete =

Tahitian association football club

- Full name: Association Sportive Vaiete
- Founded: 1926
- Ground: Papeete
- League: Tahiti Ligue 2
- 2019–20: 8th

Association Sportive Vaiete is a football club from Papeete, Tahiti. It currently competes in the Tahiti Ligue 2, the second tier of Tahitian football.

== History ==
AS Vaiete was founded in 1926 in the Papeete city. The colors of the club are white, yellow, red and black.

== Titles ==
In 1974, the club was champion of Tahiti Cup.

The other title came in the 2007–08 season, when the club won the Ligue 2 title.
