= Tahiti Ligue 2 =

- Country: Tahiti
- Confederation: OFC (Oceania)
- Divisions: Tahiti Ligue 1 (1st Division); Tahiti Ligue 2 (2nd Division); Moorea and Raiatea (3rd D.)
- Number of clubs: 13 (in 2020–21)
- Level on pyramid: 2/3
- Promotion to: Tahiti Ligue 1
- Relegation to: Moorea and Raiatea
- Domestic cup: Tahiti Cup
- International cup: OFC Champions League
- Current champions: A.S. Tamarii Punaruu (2020–21)
- Most championships: AS Temanava (4), AS Jeunes Tahitiens (2); AS Tiare Tahiti (2)
- Website: http://www.ftf.pf/
- Current: 2020–21 Tahiti Ligue 2

The Tahitian Ligue 2 is the second tier of the Fédération Tahitienne de Football in French Polynesia.

== Competition format ==
The season begins with a regular league. At the end of the regular season the teams enter a play-off league with the bottom teams from the Ligue 1 to try and win promotion.

== Teams ==
These are the teams for the 2020–21 Tahiti Ligue 2 season:

- Central Sport 2
- Excelsior 2
- Manu Ura 2
- Mataiea 2
- Olympique de Mahina 2
- Papara
- Papenoo
- Pirae 2
- Taiarapu
- Tamarii Punaruu
- Tefana 2
- Temanava
- Vénus 2

== Recent champions ==
- 2020–21: A.S. Tamarii Punaruu
- 2019–20: AS Excelsior
- 2018–19: A.S. Taravao AC
- 2017–18: AS Jeunes Tahitiens (2)
- 2016–17: AS Tamarii Punaruu
- 2015–16: AS Tefana B
- 2014–15: AS Temanava (4)
- 2013–14: A.S. Tiare Tahiti (2)
- 2012–13: AS Temanava (3)
- 2011–12: unknown
- 2010–11: AS Temanava (2)
- 2009–10: AS Temanava (1)
- 2008–09: A.S. Tiare Tahiti (1)
- 2007–08: AS Vaiete
- 2006–07: AS Aorai
- 2005–06: A.S. Vénus
- 2004–05: unknown
- 2003–04: unknown
- 2002–03: A.S. Tamarii Faa'a
- 2001–02: AS Jeunes Tahitiens (1)
