= A.S. Tiare Tahiti =

Tahitian association football club

AS Tiare Tahiti
- Full name: Association Sportive Tiare Tahiti
- Nickname: Verts de Moorea
- Founded: 1968
- Ground: Stade 'Āfareaitu
- Capacity: 1,000
- Chairman: Friedman Moana
- League: Tahiti Ligue 1
- 2021-22: 9th

Association Sportive Tiare Tahiti, is a football club from 'Āfareaitu, in the island of Moorea. It currently competes at Tahiti Ligue 1. The club name is a reference of Gardenia taitensis, the national flower of French Polynesia. They were accepted as the Moorea representants in Ligue 1, after finishing on top of the Ligue 2 Moorea in 2017–18.

== Current squad ==
Squad for the 2019–20 Tahiti Ligue 1

Note: Flags indicate national team as defined under FIFA eligibility rules; some limited exceptions apply. Players may hold more than one non-FIFA nationality.

No.	Pos.	Nation	Player
1	GK	TAH	Hoarai Tetuanui
2	MF	TAH	Jason Jones
3	FW	TAH	Karl Firiapu
5	DF	TAH	Nick Tauotaha
6	MF	TAH	Junior Tiaoao
7	MF	TAH	Tevairoa Tehuritaua
8	MF	BEN	Brison Avodagbé
9	FW	TAH	Tevaihau Tehuritaua
10	MF	TAH	Manaraii Porlier
11	FW	TAH	Toahiti Germain
12	DF	TAH	Raihani Swapp
13	DF	TAH	Urarii Hanere
14	DF	TAH	Rico Haring

No.	Pos.	Nation	Player
15	DF	TAH	Tohivea Haring
16	MF	TAH	Rick Mou
17	FW	TAH	Marii Taurua
18	MF	TAH	Tiaihau Teihotaata
19	MF	TAH	Teiki Vaea
20	DF	TAH	Tuteramana Teihotua
21	FW	TAH	Rainui Nordman
23	MF	TAH	Hiria Guilloux
24	FW	BEN	Odo Chabi
25	MF	TAH	Heiarii Maperi
28	GK	TAH	Vaiarii Halligan
30	GK	TAH	Michel Manea

== Achievements ==
- Ligue 2 Moorea
  - Champions (7): 2005–06, 2006–07, 2008–09, 2013–14, 2015–16, 2016–17, 2017–18
- Tahiti Ligue 1
  - Runners-up (1): 2018–19

=== Last seasons ===
Season	League/position
2012-13	Semifinals of Tahiti Cup.
2013-14	1st in Ligue 2 Mooréa. Coupe de Mooréa runners up. Quarter finals of Tahiti Cup.
2014-15	3rd in Ligue 2 Mooréa.
2015-16	1st in Ligue 2 Mooréa. Coupe de Mooréa runners-up. Semifinals of Tahiti Cup.
2016-17	1st in Ligue 2 Mooréa. Coupe de Mooréa runners-up. Quarter finals of Tahiti Cup.
2017-18	1st in Ligue 2 Mooréa - Admitted in Ligue 1. Coupe de Mooréa runners-up.
2018-19	2nd in Ligue 1 - Qualified to OFC Champions League. Round 1 of Tahiti Cup.
2019-20	3rd in Ligue 1. Group stage at OFC Champions League. Qualified to semifinals of Tahiti Cup.

== Continental record ==
Season	Round	Club	Result
2020	Group C	(Solomon Islands) Solomon Warriors	0–1
2020	Group C	(New Caledonia) AS Magenta	2–3
2020	Group C	(Cook Islands) Tupapa Maraerenga	w/o
