= A.S. Jeunes Tahitiens =

Tahitian association football club

AS Jeunes Tahitiens
- Full name: Association Sportive Jeunes Tahitiens
- Nickname(s): JT
- Founded: 1923
- Ground: Stade Pater
- Capacity: 11,700
- Chairman: Thierry Ariiotima
- Manager: Raiarii Golhen
- League: Tahiti Ligue 2
- 2023–24: 9th in Ligue 1 (relegated after play-offs)

Association Sportive Jeunes Tahitienes, is a football club from Papeete, Tahiti. It's one of the oldest football clubs in French Polynesia, been founded on 1923. It currently competes at Tahiti Ligue 1, after being promoted from Tahiti Ligue 2 in the 2017–18 season.

== Current squad ==
Squad for the 2019-20 Tahiti Ligue 1:

Note: Flags indicate national team as defined under FIFA eligibility rules; some limited exceptions apply. Players may hold more than one non-FIFA nationality.

No.	Pos.	Nation	Player
2	DF	(French Polynesia) TAH	Marino Tetaira
3	DF	(French Polynesia) TAH	Tamatoa Tehau
4	DF	(French Polynesia) TAH	Cyril Wong
5	DF	(French Polynesia) TAH	Raumatahi Noho
7	FW	(French Polynesia) TAH	Benson Manarii
8	FW	(French Polynesia) TAH	Moetai Vernaudon
9	FW	(French Polynesia) TAH	Guy Maihota
10	MF	(French Polynesia) TAH	William Voirin
11	MF	(New Caledonia) NCL	Romayel Nepamoindou

No.	Pos.	Nation	Player
12	DF	(French Polynesia) TAH	Manutea Largeteau
15	MF	(French Polynesia) TAH	Damon Chuong
17	DF	(French Polynesia) TAH	Manatini Sienne
19	MF	(French Polynesia) TAH	Yann Vivi
19	MF	(French Polynesia) TAH	Raihiti Teamo
21	GK	(French Polynesia) TAH	Laurens Dhou
25	DF	(France) FRA	Pierre Hazet
27	MF	(France) FRA	Justin Bailleul
69	GK	(French Polynesia) TAH	Mikaël Roche

== Staff ==
Position	Name
Coach	(French Polynesia) Raiarii Golhen

== Achievements ==
- Tahiti Ligue 1
  - Champions (3): 1954, 1961, 1987.
- Tahiti Cup
  - Champions (2): 1951, 1971, 1982, 1987, 1989.

=== Continental Record ===
Season	Round	Club	Result
1987	Quarter finals	(New Caledonia) CA Saint-Louis	3–4

=== Last seasons ===
Season	League/position
2012-13	6th in Ligue 2. Preliminary round of Tahiti Cup.
2013-14	8th in Ligue 2. Round 2 of Tahiti Cup.
2014-15	6th in Ligue 2.
2015-16	4th in Ligue 2. Round 1 of Tahiti Cup.
2016-17	4th in Ligue 2 Round 2 of Tahiti Cup.
2017-18	1st in Ligue 2 - Promoted. Semifinals of Tahiti Cup.
2018-19	8th in Ligue 1. Round 1 of Tahiti Cup.
2019-20	10th in Ligue 1. Qualified to semifinals of Tahiti Cup.
