= A.S. Central Sport =

Tahitian football club

AS Central Sport
- Full name: Association Sportive Central Sport
- Nickname: Centraliens
- Founded: 1938
- Ground: Stade Pater; Papeete, Tahiti, French Polynesia
- Capacity: 11,700
- Chairman: Eugène Haereraaroa
- Manager: Franck Mathieu
- League: Tahiti Ligue 1
- 2024–25: 6th
Home colours	Away colours

Association Sportive Central Sport, is a football club from Papeete, Tahiti, French Polynesia.

== Honours ==
- Tahiti Ligue 1
  - Champions (21): 1955, 1958, 1962, 1963, 1964, 1965, 1966, 1967, 1972, 1973, 1974, 1975, 1976, 1977, 1978, 1979, 1981, 1982, 1983, 1985, 2017–18
- Tahiti Cup:
  - Winners (18): 1950, 1953, 1954, 1957, 1961, 1962, 1966, 1967, 1972, 1973, 1975, 1976, 1977, 1979, 1981, 1983, 1988, 1995
- Tahiti Coupe des Champions
  - Winners: 2018

== Recent seasons ==
Season	League/position
2012–13	10th in Ligue 1 - Relegated. Quarter-finals of Tahiti Cup.
2013–14	3rd in Ligue 2 Promoted. Round 1 of Tahiti Cup.
2014–15	5th in Ligue 1. Semi-finals of Tahiti Cup.
2015–16	2nd in Ligue 1. Round 2 of Tahiti Cup.
2016–17	3rd in Ligue 1. Group stage of OFC Champions League. Semi-finals of Tahiti Cup.
2017–18	1st in Ligue 1. Round 1 of Tahiti Cup.
2018–19	5th in Ligue 1. Quarter-finals of OFC Champions League. Round 1 of Tahiti Cup.
2019–20	7th in Ligue 1. Quarter-finals of Tahiti Cup.

== Continental record ==
Season	Round	Club	Result
2017	Group A	(Papua New Guinea) Madang FC	7–3
2017	Group A	(New Caledonia) Magenta	2–4
2017	Group A	(Samoa) Lupe o le Soaga	3–0
2019	Group B	(Solomon Islands) Henderson Eels	3–2
2019	Group B	(Papua New Guinea) Morobe Wawens	7–0
2019	Group B	(Fiji) Lautoka	2–2
2019	Quarter-finals	(New Caledonia) Magenta	0–8

== Current squad ==
Squad for the 2020-21 Tahiti Ligue 1:

Note: Flags indicate national team as defined under FIFA eligibility rules; some limited exceptions apply. Players may hold more than one non-FIFA nationality.

No.	Pos.	Nation	Player
3	DF	TAH	Teheiarii Taupotini
4	DF	TAH	Teiki Kananou
5	DF	TAH	Vincent Simon
6	MF	TAH	Gaetan Sanchez
7	MF	TAH	Herehaunui Ferrand
8	FW	TAH	Jess Horoi
9	DF	TAH	Peter Babka
10	MF	TAH	Heimana Pito
12	DF	FRA	Florent Gaudy
13	MF	TAH	Keanu Monnier

No.	Pos.	Nation	Player
14	DF	TAH	Ariiura Siejidr
15	MF	TAH	Manuarii Vahirua
16	GK	TAH	Vaiarii Halligan
17	MF	FRA	Arthur Lepape
19	DF	TAH	David Tahi
20	GK	TAH	Tamatiti Patia
21	FW	TAH	Fred Tissot
22	FW	TAH	Valdo Yakeula
24	MF	FRA	Renan Leperf

== Staff ==
Position	Name
Head coach	(France) Frank Mathieu

== Former players ==
- (Chile) César Castillo
