= A.S. Arue =

Tahitian association football club

AS Arue
- Full name: Association Sportive Arue Football Club
- Ground: Stade Boris Leontieff; Arue, French Polynesia
- Capacity: 1,000
- Chairman: Marc Ploton
- Manager: Luca Garzia
- League: Tahiti Ligue 2
- 2023–24: 8th
Home colours	Away colours

Association Sportive Arue, is a football club from Arue, Tahiti. It currently competes in the Tahiti Ligue 1, after being promoted from the Tahiti Ligue 2 in the 2019–20 season.

The club grounds are named after a previous mayor of Arue, Boris Léontieff, who was declared deceased after his plane went missing in May 2002.

== Last seasons ==
Season	League/position
2012-13	5th in Ligue 2.
2013-14	8th in Ligue 2. Semifinals of Tahiti Cup.
2014-15	4th in Ligue 2. Quarter finals of Tahiti Cup.
2015-16	2nd in Ligue 2 - Promoted. Round 1 of Tahiti Cup.
2016-17	8th in Ligue 1 - Relegated. Round 2 of Tahiti Cup.
2017-18	2nd in Ligue 2 - Promoted. Round 1 of Tahiti Cup.
2018-19	9th in Ligue 1 - Relegated. Quarter-finals of Tahiti Cup.
2019-20	2nd in Ligue 2 - Promoted. Round 1 of Tahiti Cup.

== Current squad ==
Squad for the 2020–21 Tahiti Ligue 1

Note: Flags indicate national team as defined under FIFA eligibility rules; some limited exceptions apply. Players may hold more than one non-FIFA nationality.

No.	Pos.	Nation	Player
1	GK	(French Polynesia) TAH	Raitua Harehoe
2	DF	(French Polynesia) TAH	Mathieu Talbot
3	DF	(French Polynesia) TAH	Jonathan Peterano
4	MF	(French Polynesia) TAH	Maugaroa Matikaua
5	DF	(French Polynesia) TAH	Kaiki Ah Scha
6	MF	(France) FRA	Pierre Geslin
8	MF	(French Polynesia) TAH	Kevin Mare
10	FW	(French Polynesia) TAH	Hiro Tauhiro
11	FW	(French Polynesia) TAH	Ariimatini Buchin

No.	Pos.	Nation	Player
12	DF	(French Polynesia) TAH	Garett Besseyre
13	DF	(French Polynesia) TAH	Tamatoa Lyau
16	DF	(French Polynesia) TAH	Simiona Deane
17	FW	(French Polynesia) TAH	Steeve Hanoux
19	MF	(French Polynesia) TAH	Marino Tetaria
24	MF	(French Polynesia) TAH	Clayton Paitia
25	DF	(French Polynesia) TAH	Nohoarii Deane
26	MF	(French Polynesia) TAH	Cherry Tehaamoana
30	GK	(French Polynesia) TAH	Mael Williams

== Staff ==
Position	Name
Coach	(France) Luca Garzia

== Achievements ==
- Tahiti Ligue 1
  - Champions (1): 1980
- Tahiti Cup
  - Champions (1): 1970
