= A.S. Tamarii Punaruu =

Tahitian association football club

AS Tamarii Punaruu
- Full name: Association Sportive Tamarii Punaruu
- Ground: Stade Punaruu; Puna'auia, Tahiti, French Polynesia
- League: Tahiti Ligue 1
- 2024–25: 7th

Association Sportive Tamarii Punaruu, is a football club from Puna'auia, Tahiti. The club currently competes in the Tahiti Ligue 1, the first tier of the football system in Tahiti, after being promoted following the 2020–21 season. They play their home games at Stade Punaruu.

== Honneurs ==
Tahiti Ligue 1

- Champions: 1969

Tahiti Cup

- Winners: 1968, 1969

Tahiti Ligue 2

- Winners: 2016–17, 2020–21

== Recent seasons ==
Season	League/position
2012–13	11th in Ligue 1 - Relegated. Quarter-finals of Tahiti Cup.
2013–14	4th in Ligue 2.
2014–15	9th in Ligue 2.
2015–16	7th in Ligue 2. Round 1 of Tahiti Cup.
2016–17	1st in Ligue 2 - Promoted. Round 1 of Tahiti Cup.
2017–18	10th in Ligue 1 - Relegated. Round 2 od Tahiti Cup.
2018–19	6th in Ligue 2. Round 1 of Tahiti Cup.
2019–20	5th in Ligue 2. Round 2 of Tahiti Cup.
2020–21	1st in Ligue 2 - Promoted.
