= A.S. Papara =

Tahitian association football club

AS Papara
- Full name: Association Sportive Papara FC
- Ground: Stade Hotumaru, Papara
- Chairman: Daniel Matthews
- League: Tahiti Ligue 2
- 2019–20: 8th

Association Sportive Papara FC is a football club from Papara, Tahiti. It currently competes in the Tahiti Ligue 2, the second tier of Tahitian football.

== Last seasons ==
Season	League/position
2012-13	unknown.
2013-14	unknown.
2014-15	unknown.
2015-16	unknown.
2016-17	Round 1 of Tahiti Cup.
2017-18	2nd in Ligue 3 - Promoted. Round 1 of Tahiti Cup.
2018-19	9th in Ligue 2.
2019-20	8th in Ligue 2 - Promoted. Round 1 of Tahiti Cup.
