= Tahitian Football Federation =

Governing body of association football in Tahiti

OFC
- Founded: 1989
- Headquarters: Pirae
- FIFA affiliation: 1990
- OFC affiliation: 1990
- President: Henri Ariiotima
- Website: http://www.ftf.pf

The Tahitian Football Federation (French: Fédération Tahitienne de Football) is the governing body of football in French Polynesia. The Tahiti's men national football team is, after Australia and New Zealand, the third most successful nation in the OFC. They won the 2012 OFC Nations Cup after playing the final vs New Caledonia. The headquarters of the Tahiti Football Federation are located in Pirae founded in 1989.

== Divisions ==
- Ligue 1 Vini
- Tahiti Ligue 2
- Ligue 2 Moorea and Raiatea (from the French Polynesian divisions)
- Ligue 3

== Cups ==
- Coupe de Polynésie / Coupe de Tahiti Nui
- Tahiti Super Cup
