= A.S. Pirae =

Tahitian football club

- Full name: Association Sportive Pirae
- Nickname: The Shark
- Founded: 13 June 1929; 97 years ago
- Ground: Stade Pater; Pirae, Tahiti
- Capacity: 11,700
- Chairman: Heimana Salem
- Manager: Vetea Terai
- League: Tahiti Ligue 1
Home colours	Away colours

Association Sportive Pirae ([pi.ra.e]) is a professional Tahitian football club based in Pirae. They are one of the most successful teams in Tahiti, having won the Tahiti Division Fédérale eleven times. They are also the first French Polynesian team to have reached the final of the OFC Champions League, which they achieved in 2006. They were selected by the OFC to participate in the 2021 FIFA Club World Cup.

== History ==
=== Oceania Club Championship 2006 ===
AS Pirae qualified for the Oceania Club Championship 2006 after winning the Division Fédérale. In the group stages they recorded big wins against Marist FC 10–1, and Sobou FC 7–0, which was enough to secure their passage to the semi-finals despite a 1–0 defeat to Auckland City in the last game. In the semi-finals they pulled off a major shock beating YoungHeart Manawatu 2–1 thanks to early goals from Jose Hmae and Naea Bennett. However, in the Final they met Auckland City once again and suffered a 3–1 defeat. This remains the best performance by any French Polynesian side in the premier Oceanian club competition.

=== 2007–2010 ===
Between 2007 and 2010 Pirae have been unable to replicate the form that saw them finish runners-up in the Oceania Club Championship and they have not qualified for the competition in its new form the OFC Champions League. In the 2009–10 season Pirae finished 4th in the Division Fédérale and then 4th in the Championship play-off.

=== 2021 FIFA Club World Cup ===
Pirae participated in the 2021 FIFA Club World Cup as Oceanian representatives, after being nominated by the Oceania Football Confederation (OFC) on 31 December 2021. Initially, Auckland City were nominated by the OFC after the 2021 OFC Champions League was cancelled due to the COVID-19 pandemic. However, Auckland City withdrew from the competition on 31 December 2021 due to delayed reopening of the borders in New Zealand related to the COVID-19 pandemic, and the reintroduction of the mandatory managed isolation and quarantine system upon returning to the country. As a result, Pirae were nominated instead by the OFC, based on sporting merit principles. Pirae lost 4–1 in the play-off match of Club World cup against hosts Al Jazira, with their only goal coming via an own goal from Mohammed Rabii.

== Honours ==
=== Domestic ===
- Tahiti Ligue 1
  - Champions (12): 1989, 1991, 1993, 1994, 2001, 2003, 2006, 2013–14, 2019–20, 2020–21 2021–22, 2023–24.
- Tahiti Cup
  - Winners (10): 1970, 1980, 1984, 1994, 1996, 1999, 2000, 2002, 2005, 2023.
- Tahiti Coupe des Champions
  - Winners (3): 1996, 2021, 2022.

=== Continental ===
- Oceania Club Championship/OFC Champions League
  - Runners-up: 2006, 2024
- Pacific French Territories Cup
  - Winners: 2001, 2007
- Coupe D.O.M-T.O.M
  - Winners: 2002

== Recent seasons ==
Season	League/position
2012–13	7th in Ligue 1. 1/8 finals of Tahiti Cup.
2013–14	1st in Ligue 1. Qualified to OFC Champions League. Semifinals of Tahiti Cup.
2014–15	2nd in Ligue 1. Tahiti Cup champions. OFC Champions League Group stage.
2015–16	4th in Ligue 1. 7th Round of Coupe de France. Quarter finals of Tahiti Cup.
2016–17	6th in Ligue 1. Round 2 of Tahiti Cup.
2017–18	4th in Ligue 1. Round 2 of Tahiti Cup.
2018–19	4th in Ligue 1. Semifinals of Tahiti Cup.
2019–20	1st in Ligue 1. Qualified to OFC Champions League. Quarter finals of Tahiti Cup.
2020–21	1st in Ligue 1. Qualified to OFC Champions League. Runners-up of Tahiti Cup. OFC Champions League cancelled. Nominated for the 2021 FIFA Club World Cup.

== Performance by competition ==
=== French competitions ===
- French Cup: 11 appearances

1989–90, 1990–91, 1992–93, 1993–94, 1994–95, 1996–97, 1998–99, 1999–00, 2000–01, 2002–03, 2015–16

- Best performance:

Eighth round – 1989–90, 1990–91, 1992–93

== Continental record ==
- OFC Champions League: 1 appearance

Best: Semi-finalist, 2013–14

- Oceania Club Championship: 1 appearance

Best:
2006: Finalist

OFC Men's Champions League results
Season	Round	Club		Home	Away	Aggregate
2005	Group A	(Papua New Guinea)	Sobou	5–1		2nd
2005	Group A	(New Zealand)	Auckland City	1–0		2nd
2005	Group A	(Australia)	Sydney FC	0–6		2nd
2005	Semi-finals	(New Caledonia)	Magenta	1–4		
2006	Group A	(Solomon Islands)	Marist	10–1		2nd
2006	Group A	(Papua New Guinea)	Sobou	7–0		2nd
2006	Group A	(New Zealand)	Auckland City	0–1		2nd
2006	Semi-finals	(New Zealand)	YoungHeart Manawatu	2–1		
2006	Final	(New Zealand)	Auckland City	1–3		
2013–14	Group A	(Solomon Islands)	Solomon Warriors	2–1		1st
2013–14	Group A	(Samoa)	Kiwi	8–0		1st
2013–14	Group A	(New Zealand)	Waitakere United	3–1		1st
2013–14	Semi-finals	(New Zealand)	Auckland City	2–1	0–3	2–4
2014–15	Group A	(Samoa)	Lupe o le Soaga	3–3		3rd
2014–15	Group A	(New Caledonia)	Gaïtcha	2–5		3rd
2014–15	Group A	(Fiji)	Ba F.C.	0–2		3rd
