= Māhina =

Commune in French Polynesia, France

- Commune
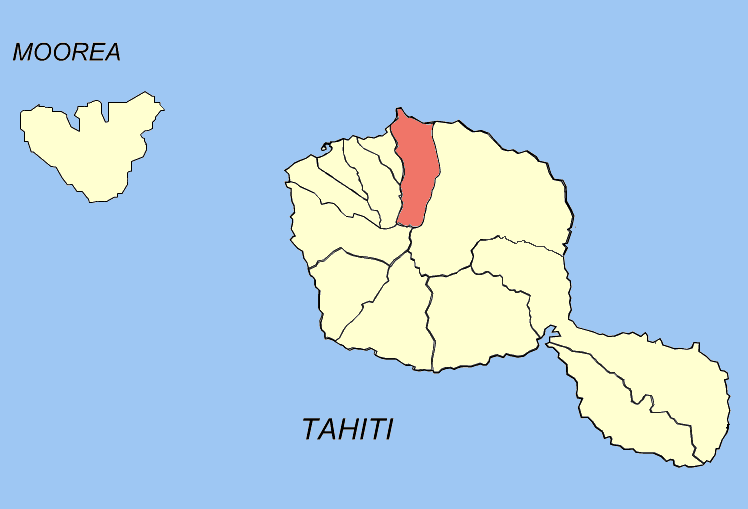
- Location of the commune (in red) within the Windward Islands
- Location of Māhina
- Coordinates: 17°30′34″S 149°27′22″W
- Country: France
- Overseas collectivity: French Polynesia
- Subdivision: Windward Islands

Government
  - Mayor (2020–2026): Damas Teuira
- Area^{1}: 52 km^{2} (20 sq mi)
- Elevation: 9 m (30 ft)
- Highest elevation: 2,241 m (7,352 ft)
- Lowest elevation: 0 m (0 ft)
- Population (2022): 14,623
  - Density: 280/km^{2} (730/sq mi)
- Time zone: UTC−10:00
- INSEE/Postal code: 98725 /98709
- ^{1} French Land Register data, which excludes lakes, ponds, glaciers > 1 km^{2} (0.386 sq mi or 247 acres) and river estuaries.

Māhina is a commune in the north of Tahiti in French Polynesia, an overseas territory of France in the Pacific Ocean. Māhina is located on the island of Tahiti, in the administrative subdivision of the Windward Islands, themselves part of the Society Islands. Māhina is the 5th most populous commune in French Polynesia with a population of 14,623 (2022 census), in an area of 52 km^{2}. Mount Orohena is a nearby mountain.

== History ==
The area of Māhina was first settled by early Polynesians. Large, double-hulled canoes made out of tree trunks were used to sail across the Pacific, some vessels making it to Tahiti. In 1768, Captain James Cook was sent to Tahiti to observe the Transit of Venus. He set up his observatory in Māhina, on the black sand beach at the end of Matavai Bay, now called Pointe Vénus. He later sailed off to nearby Mo'orea and a few years later, he sailed to New Zealand and Australia. Charles Darwin had later come to Tahiti on his expedition. Don the Beachcomber had lived in Tahiti until his house was destroyed by a cyclone. The Faaʻa International Airport in Faʻaʻā was built in 1962, 16 km away from Māhina. In 2007, Air Moorea flight 1121 crashed right after take of from Faaʻa Airport on its way to Mo'orea, killing all 20 people on board.

== Transportation ==
Tahiti's 5 km west coast freeway called RDO (Route de Dégagement Ouest) ends in nearby Papeʻete and smaller 2-lane roads lead to the ending of the freeway through the city of Papeʻete. The main roads in Māhina are paved, while some roads further inside the island turn into dirt tracks and lead deep into valleys.

== Geography ==
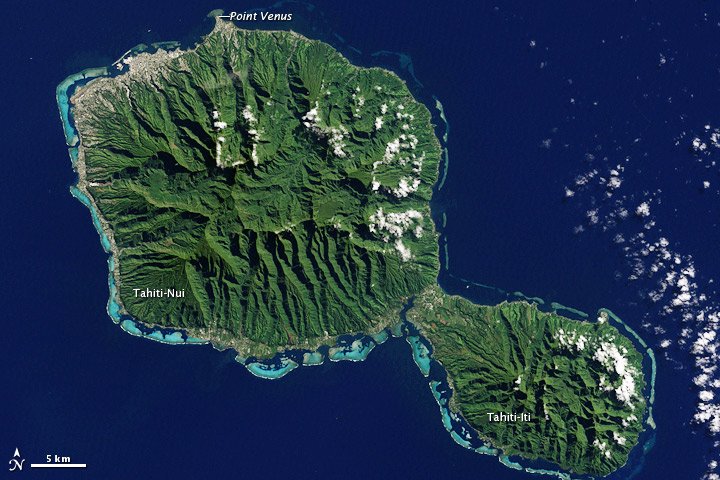
Point Venus is marked in this annotated Landsat image

Māhina is on the northern coast of Tahiti about 9 meters above mean sea level. The commune of Arue is located to the west of Māhina. Mount Orohena is the tallest mountain in French Polynesia at 7,300 feet. Point Venus is a nearby lighthouse on the coast and people are able to view Mo'orea. Papenoo is a nearby commune that is home of the mouth of the Papenoo River.

== Education ==
The University of French Polynesia is the only university in all of French Polynesia. Students from many other islands come to this university. The University of French Polynesia is a relatively small university with around 2,000 students. High schools are found throughout Tahiti. Some students in Māhina will attend universities or higher education establishments in other countries such as France, the United States or New Zealand.

== Economy ==
Many supermarkets are found throughout Māhina and sell a large range of goods, from food to small white goods and tools. The large Papeʻete supermarket in Papeʻete is 10 km away in the center of the town. Faʻaʻā has one of the largest supermarkets in the island with clothing stores, beauty shops, a pharmacy, furniture stores, cafes and Tahitian restaurants. Māhina has a few industrial valleys that are home to factories. Some hardware stores such as Polybuild, Polymat, and Polywood are found in these valleys.

== Safety ==
Māhina has a local police force called Police Municipale whose role is to ensure the safety of residents and businesses, monitor and regulate traffic, enforce urban planning laws, report crimes over which they have no jurisdiction and offer assistance to citizens in the town. They are assisted in their task by the Gendarmerie, a military force with law enforcement duties.

== See also ==
- French Polynesia
- Matavai Bay
- Tahiti
