= A.S. Manu-Ura =

French Polynesian football team

AS Manu-Ura
- Full name: Association Sportive Manu-Ura
- Founded: 1953
- Ground: Stade Paea; Papeete, Tahiti
- Capacity: 10,000
- Chairman: Emile Anihia
- League: Tahiti Ligue 1
- 2023–24: 3rd in Ligue 2 (promoted)
Home colours	Away colours

AS Manu-Ura is a French Polynesian football team based in Papeete, currently playing in the Tahiti First Division, the top football league in Tahiti. Formed in 1953, AS Manu Ura has a strong history in domestic and regional football with five league titles and three Coupe de Polynesie crowns to their name.

== Recent seasons ==
The side has been a dominant force in Tahitian football between 2007 and 2010. The club won a hat-trick of league titles from 2007 to 2009, twice qualifying for the OFC Champions League. In 2010 the club finished top of the league table however they only managed fifth in the Championship Play-Off resulting in the title and Champions League qualification going to rivals AS Tefana.

== Achievements ==
- Tahiti First Division: 5

1996, 2004, 2007, 2008, 2009.

- Tahiti Cup: 2

2003, 2005.

- Tahiti Coupe des Champions: 1

2008.

- Pacific French Territories Cup: 2

1996, 2004.

=== Continental record ===
Season	Round	Club	Result
2005	Group B	(New Caledonia) AS Magenta	1–4
2005	Group B	(Solomon Islands) Makuru	1–2
2005	Group B	(Vanuatu) Tafea	0–2
2007–08	Group A	(New Zealand) Waitakere United	0–6
2007–08	Group A	(New Zealand) Auckland City	1–1
2007–08	Group A	(New Zealand) Waitakere United	1–2
2007–08	Group A	(New Zealand) Auckland City	0–1
2009–10	Group A	(New Zealand) Auckland City	0–5
2009–10	Group A	(New Zealand) Waitakere United	0–2
2009–10	Group A	(New Caledonia) AS Magenta	1–1
2009–10	Group A	(New Zealand) Auckland City	0–2
2009–10	Group A	(New Zealand) Waitakere United	1–5
2009–10	Group A	(New Caledonia) AS Magenta	1–8

=== Last seasons ===
Season	League/position
2012-13	4th in Ligue 1. Semifinals of Tahiti Cup.
2013-14	3rd in Ligue 1. Quarter finals of Tahiti Cup.
2014-15	4th in Ligue 1.
2015-16	5th in Ligue 1. Semifinals of Tahiti Cup.
2016-17	7th in Ligue 1. Quarter finals of Tahiti Cup.
2017-18	7th in Ligue 1. Round 2 of Tahiti Cup.
2018-19	7th in Ligue 1. Semifinals of Tahiti Cup.
2019-20	6th in Ligue 1. Round 2 Tahiti Cup.

== The club in the French football structure ==
- French Cup : 3 appearances

2003–04, 2005–06, 2009–10

== Performance in OFC competitions ==
- OFC Champions League: 2 appearances

Best: 3° in Group A 2008 and 2010
2008: 3° in Group A
2010: 3° in Group A

== Current squad ==
Squad for the 2019-20 Tahiti Ligue 1

Note: Flags indicate national team as defined under FIFA eligibility rules; some limited exceptions apply. Players may hold more than one non-FIFA nationality.

No.	Pos.	Nation	Player
1	GK	TAH	Jonathan Torohia
3	DF	TAH	Jean-Paul Faura
4	DF	TAH	Heitini Tupea
5	MF	TAH	Monakea Fuller
6	MF	TAH	Rooarii Roo
7	MF	TAH	Tunoa Tevaearai
8	MF	TAH	Hitiau Reid
9	DF	TAH	Matatia Paama
10	MF	TAH	Smith Tino

No.	Pos.	Nation	Player
11	MF	TAH	Manoa Mu
12	FW	TAH	François Mu
13	DF	TAH	Torea Jubely
14	FW	TAH	Garry Rochette
16	DF	TAH	Manamana Faatomo
18	FW	NCL	Josué Wathiepel
25	FW	TAH	Patrick Snow
26	FW	TAH	Christopher Hopuare
