= A.S. Papenoo =

Tahitian association football club

AS Papenoo
- Full name: Association Sportive Papenoo
- Ground: Stade Tetiamana, Papenoo
- Chairman: Fabrice Vaitu
- League: Tahiti Ligue 2
- 2019–20: 7th

Association Sportive de Papenoo is a football club from Papenoo, Tahiti. It currently competes in the Tahiti Ligue 2, the second tier of Tahitian football.

== Last seasons ==
Season	League/position
2012–13	7th in Ligue 2. Preliminary round of Tahiti Cup.
2013–14	12th in Ligue 2.
2014–15	7th in Ligue 2.
2015–16	6th in Ligue 2. Round 1 of Tahiti Cup.
2016–17	8th in Ligue 2; won the relegation playoff. Round 1 of Tahiti Cup.
2017–18	4th in Ligue 2. Quarter finals of Tahiti Cup.
2018–19	8th in Ligue 2.
2019–20	7th in Ligue 2. Round 1 of Tahiti Cup.
