= A.S. Olympique de Mahina =

Tahitian association football club

AS Olympique Mahina
- Full name: Association Sportive Olympique de Mahina
- Ground: Stade Municipal de Mahina; Māhina, Tahiti, French Polynesia
- Capacity: 1,000
- League: Tahiti Ligue 2
- 2024–25: 10th

Association Sportive Olympique de Mahina, is a football club from Māhina, Tahiti. They currently compete in the Tahiti Ligue 2 the second tier of the football system in Tahiti. They play their home games at Stade Municipal de Mahina, which they share with the rival club A.S. Vénus.

== Last seasons ==
Season	League/position
2012-13	8th in Ligue 1. 1/8 finals of Tahiti Cup.
2013-14	10th in Ligue 1 - Relegated. Round 2 of Tahiti Cup.
2014-15	5th in Ligue 2.
2015-16	3rd in Ligue 2 - Promoted. Quarter finals of Tahiti Cup.
2016-17	9th in Ligue 1 - Relegated. Round 2 of Tahiti Cup.
2017-18	3rd in Ligue 2. Quarter finals of Tahiti Cup.
2018-19	2nd in Ligue 2 - Promoted after play-offs. Round 1 of Tahiti Cup.
2019-20	8th in Ligue 1. Round 1 of Tahiti Cup.
