= Stade Pater Te Hono Nui =

Soccer stadium in Papeete, French Polynesia

Stade Pater
- Interactive map of Stade Pater
- Full name: Stade Pater Te Hono Nui
- Location: (French Polynesia) Pirae, Tahiti, France
- Coordinates: 17°32′24″S 149°33′7″W
- Capacity: 11,700

Construction
- Opened: 10 September 1971
- Renovated: 2025–2027 (planned)
- Project manager: China State Construction Engineering

Tenant
- Tahiti United (OFCPL) (2026–present)

Stade Pater is a multi-use stadium in Pirae, Tahiti, in French Polynesia, France. It is currently used mostly for football matches. The stadium holds a capacity of 11,700 people.
