= A.S. Taiarapu =

Tahitian association football club

AS Taiarapu FC
- Full name: Association Sportive Taiarapu Football Club
- Founded: 2015
- Ground: Stade Teahupo'o; Teahupoo, French Polynesia
- League: Tahiti Ligue 1
- 2024–25: 9th

Association Sportive Taiarapu Football Club, is a football club from Taiarapu-Ouest, Tahiti. It currently competes at Tahiti Ligue 1. It merged from the fusion of two previous teams, the AS Vairao and the AS Roniu.

== Current squad ==
Squad for the 2019-20 Tahiti Ligue 2

Note: Flags indicate national team as defined under FIFA eligibility rules; some limited exceptions apply. Players may hold more than one non-FIFA nationality.

| No. | Pos. | Nation | Player |
|---|---|---|---|
| 1 | GK | (French Polynesia) TAH | Jimmy Tavaearii |
| 2 | DF | (French Polynesia) TAH | Jonathan Tutavae |
| 3 | DF | (French Polynesia) TAH | Jeff Heuea |
| 9 | FW | (French Polynesia) TAH | Thibault Sarauer |
| 12 | FW, GK | (French Polynesia) TAH | Wallen Teiri |
| 13 | FW | (French Polynesia) TAH | Vahi'ani Vaikau |
| 15 | MF | (French Polynesia) TAH | Cristián Monaco |
| 17 | DF | (French Polynesia) TAH | Taiau Reva |
| 18 | MF | (France) FRA | Bryan Le Brun |
| 19 | FW | (French Polynesia) TAH | Toahiti Ravea |
| 20 | MF | (French Polynesia) TAH | Tanaoa Hioe |

| No. | Pos. | Nation | Player |
|---|---|---|---|
| 21 | DF | (French Polynesia) TAH | Charles Burns |
| 22 | MF | (French Polynesia) TAH | Rooniu Tautu |
| 23 | MF | (French Polynesia) TAH | Heiarii Poroiae |
| 24 | DF | (French Polynesia) TAH | Manoarii Tehei |
| 25 | FW | (French Polynesia) TAH | Teanuanua Tekakeoteragi |
| 26 | MF | (French Polynesia) TAH | Samuera Tutavae |
| 27 | MF | (French Polynesia) TAH | Faarua Maitui |
| 28 | MF | (French Polynesia) TAH | Tristan Javerzat |
| 29 | DF | (French Polynesia) TAH | Damas Pouira |
| 30 | DF | (French Polynesia) TAH | Arihee Tetuaiteroi |
| 31 | DF | (French Polynesia) TAH | Herehia Li Fung Kuee |
