= Football at the 2015 Pacific Games – Men's team squads =

The following is the squad list for the 2015 Pacific Games.

Those marked in bold have been capped at full International level.

== Group A ==
=== Fiji ===
Head coach: (Uruguay) Juan Carlos Buzzetti

No.	Pos.	Player	Date of birth (age)	Caps	Goals	Club
1	GK	Senirusi Bokini	6 February 1994 (aged 21)	3	0	(Fiji Football Association) Lautoka
2	DF	Praneel Naidu	29 January 1995 (aged 20)	0	0	(Fiji Football Association) Ba
3	MF	Manasa Nawakula	3 June 1994 (aged 21)	3	0	(Fiji Football Association) Ba
4	MF	Jale Dreola	21 April 1995 (aged 20)	0	0	(Fiji Football Association) Suva
5	FW	Rusiate Matarerega	17 January 1993 (aged 22)	3	0	(Fiji Football Association) Suva
6	DF	Viliame Bawai	9 March 1993 (aged 22)	3	0	(Fiji Football Association) Rewa
7	MF	Garish Prasad	1 February 1995 (aged 20)	0	0	(Fiji Football Association) Rewa
8	DF	Sakaraia Naisua	9 March 1993 (aged 22)	2	0	(Fiji Football Association) Suva
9	FW	Iosefo Verevou	5 January 1996 (aged 19)	3	0	(Fiji Football Association) Rewa
10	MF	Christopher Wasasala	31 December 1994 (aged 20)	2	2	(Fiji Football Association) Labasa
11	DF	Ravinesh Dass	2 November 1993 (aged 21)	3	0	(Fiji Football Association) Nadroga
12	MF	Tevita Waranaivalu	16 September 1995 (aged 19)	0	0	(Fiji Football Association) Rewa
13	FW	Saula Waqa	12 October 1995 (aged 19)	3	0	(Fiji Football Association) Ba
14	DF	Antonio Tuivuna	20 March 1995 (aged 20)	0	0	(Fiji Football Association) Nadi
15	FW	Napolioni Qasevakatini	17 March 1993 (aged 22)	2	0	(Fiji Football Association) Suva
16	MF	Ratu Nakalevu	7 March 1994 (aged 21)	1	0	(Fiji Football Association) Rewa
17	DF	Filipe Baravilala	25 November 1994 (aged 20)	3	0	(Fiji Football Association) Nadi
18	DF	Kolinio Sivoki	10 March 1995 (aged 20)	0	0	(Fiji Football Association) Suva
19	MF	Nickel Chand	28 July 1995 (aged 19)	0	0	(Fiji Football Association) Suva
20	GK	Tevita Koroi	12 April 1994 (aged 21)	0	0	(Fiji Football Association) Suva

=== Federated States of Micronesia ===
Head coach: (Australia) Stan Foster

No.	Pos.	Player	Date of birth (age)	Caps	Goals	Club
1	GK	Walter Pengelbew	10 October 1997 (aged 17)	0	0	(Federated States of Micronesia Football Association) Nimgil
2	MF	Kacy Alton Olmos	11 January 1995 (aged 20)	0	0	
3	MF	Mikson Kuka	21 May 1992 (aged 23)	0	0	
4	DF	Jacob Nam	29 June 1997 (aged 18)	0	0	(Federated States of Micronesia Football Association) Weloy Strikers
5	MF	Ioane Kariti	21 August 1993 (aged 21)	0	0	(Federated States of Micronesia Football Association) COM-FSM
7	MF	Javin Kognang	24 December 1994 (aged 20)	0	0	(Federated States of Micronesia Football Association) Nimgil
8	MF	Franson Simon	8 August 1993 (aged 21)	0	0	(Federated States of Micronesia Football Association) COM-FSM
9	MF	Mark Jones	19 August 1995 (aged 19)	0	0	(Federated States of Micronesia Football Association) COM-FSM
10	DF	Roger Nakasone	22 October 1992 (aged 22)	0	0	(Federated States of Micronesia Football Association) Island Pitbulls
11	MF	Aaron Bayow	10 March 1998 (aged 17)	0	0	(Federated States of Micronesia Football Association) Nimgil
12	DF	Scott Rudolph	12 August 1992 (aged 22)	0	0	
13	DF	James MacArthur	31 January 1992 (aged 23)	0	0	(Federated States of Micronesia Football Association) Island Pitbulls
14	DF	Paulis Keikek	9 November 1993 (aged 21)	0	0	
15	FW	Jonathan Garayog	27 December 1993 (aged 21)	0	0	(Federated States of Micronesia Football Association) NYO
16	MF	Devon Figirmow	25 October 1997 (aged 17)	0	0	(Federated States of Micronesia Football Association) G&B Club Rull
17	DF	Benjamin Gilmoon	9 October 1996 (aged 18)	0	0	(Federated States of Micronesia Football Association) Nimgil
18	FW	Dominic Gadad	15 June 1995 (aged 20)	0	0	(Federated States of Micronesia Football Association) Nimgil
20	FW	Michael Reyes	15 July 1989 (aged 25)	0	0	(Federated States of Micronesia Football Association) COM-FSM

=== Tahiti ===
Head coach: (France) Patrice Flaccadori

No.	Pos.	Player	Date of birth (age)	Caps	Goals	Club
1	GK	Tetahio Teriinohopuaiterai	1 January 1997 (aged 18)	0	0	
2	DF	Tevaimoana Meslien	16 March 1994 (aged 21)	0	0	
3	DF	Raimana Tipahaehae	1 January 1996 (aged 19)	0	0	
4	DF	Rainui Aroita	25 January 1994 (aged 21)	0	0	
5	DF	Teheiarii Taupotini	1 January 1995 (aged 20)	0	0	
6	MF	Louis Petitgas	1 January 1994 (aged 21)	0	0	
7	FW	Tauatua Lucas	1 January 1994 (aged 21)	0	0	
8	FW	Manuarii Hauata	17 March 1994 (aged 21)	0	0	
9	FW	Fred Tissot	14 July 1995 (aged 19)	0	0	
10	FW	Yohann Tihoni	20 July 1994 (aged 20)	0	0	
11	MF	Mauarii Tehina	1 January 1994 (aged 21)	0	0	
12	FW	Raiamanu Tetauira	1 January 1993 (aged 22)	0	0	
13	MF	Raumatahi Noho	1 January 1992 (aged 23)	0	0	
14	FW	Tevairoa Tehuritaua	15 October 1994 (aged 20)	0	0	
15	MF	Rayan Petitgas	26 December 1998 (aged 16)	0	0	
16	GK	Temauiraii Crolas	1 January 1994 (aged 21)	0	0	
17	DF	Tumarangi Tiatoa	1 January 1992 (aged 23)	0	0	
18	MF	Heremoana Hoata	1 January 1994 (aged 21)	0	0	
19	MF	Tamatoa Tetauira	24 March 1998 (aged 17)	0	0	
20	DF	Raimana Dahlluin	1 January 1993 (aged 22)	0	0	
21	DF	Thibaut Pito	29 January 1994 (aged 21)	0	0	
22	FW	Michel Maihi	6 March 1998 (aged 17)	0	0	
23	GK	Vaiarii Halligan	18 March 1998 (aged 17)	0	0	

=== Vanuatu ===
Head coach: Richard Iwai

No.	Pos.	Player	Date of birth (age)	Caps	Goals	Club
1	GK	**Seiloni Iaruel**	17 April 1995 (aged 20)	9	0	(Vanuatu Football Federation) Tafea
2	DF	Chanel Obed	3 September 1995 (aged 19)	5	0	(Vanuatu Football Federation) Amicale
3	DF	Remy Kalsrap	20 January 1996 (aged 19)	5	0	(Vanuatu Football Federation) Erakor Golden Star
4	DF	**Brian Kaltak** (c)	30 September 1993 (aged 21)	10	1	(Vanuatu Football Federation) Erakor Golden Star
5	DF	Junia Vava	13 September 1993 (aged 21)	5	0	(Vanuatu Football Federation) Ifira Black Bird
6	DF	Raoul Coulon	3 December 1995 (aged 19)	5	0	(Vanuatu Football Federation) Tupuji Imere
7	MF	Barry Mansale	1 November 1995 (aged 19)	8	1	(Papua New Guinea Football Association) Hekari United
8	FW	Bill Nicolls	3 June 1993 (aged 22)	1	1	(Vanuatu Football Federation) Tupuji Imere
9	FW	Christopher Andrew	2 January 1993 (aged 22)	5	2	(Vanuatu Football Federation) Erakor Golden Star
10	MF	Bong Kalo	18 January 1997 (aged 18)	4	1	(Vanuatu Football Federation) Tafea
11	FW	**Jean Kaltak**	19 August 1994 (aged 20)	10	4	(Vanuatu Football Federation) Erakor Golden Star
12	MF	Zica Manuhi	23 July 1993 (aged 21)	1	0	(Vanuatu Football Federation) Tafea
13	MF	Dalong Damalip	12 May 1993 (aged 22)	4	0	(Vanuatu Football Federation) Amicale
14	MF	Michel Coulon	3 December 1995 (aged 19)	1	0	(Vanuatu Football Federation) Tupuji Imere
15	MF	Nilua Nikau	4 March 1993 (aged 22)	1	1	(Vanuatu Football Federation) Ifira Black Bird
16	MF	Nemani Rogara	9 June 1993 (aged 22)	0	0	(Vanuatu Football Federation) Erakor Golden Star
17	DF	**Kevin Shem**	5 December 1993 (aged 21)	5	0	(Vanuatu Football Federation) Tafea
18	MF	Abraham Rogara	20 July 1994 (aged 20)	0	0	(Vanuatu Football Federation) Erakor Golden Star
19	MF	Jacky Ruben	24 June 1996 (aged 19)	1	0	(Vanuatu Football Federation) Erakor Golden Star
20	FW	Tony Kaltak	5 November 1996 (aged 18)	0	0	(Vanuatu Football Federation) Erakor Golden Star
21	DF	Jais Malsarani	7 March 1994 (aged 21)	0	0	(Vanuatu Football Federation) Tafea
22	GK	Anthony Taiwia	4 September 1994 (aged 20)	0	0	(Vanuatu Football Federation) Ifira Black Bird
23	GK	Kalo Firiam	10 December 1994 (aged 20)	0	0	(Vanuatu Football Federation) Tafea

== Group B ==
=== New Caledonia ===
Head coach: (France) Thierry Sardo

No.	Pos.	Player	Date of birth (age)	Caps	Goals	Club
1	GK	Thomas Schmidt	4 June 1996 (aged 19)	1	0	(New Caledonian Football Federation) AS Mont-Dore
2	DF	Jorys Mène	2 January 1995 (aged 20)	0	0	(French Football Federation) US Tourcoing FC
3	DF	Aquilas Wahnapo	25 April 1993 (aged 22)	0	0	(French Football Federation) Sud Nivernais Imphy Decize
4	DF	Jean Brice Wadriako	15 January 1993 (aged 22)	1	0	(New Caledonian Football Federation) A.S. Magenta
5	DF	Jean Luc Decoire	16 April 1996 (aged 19)	1	0	(New Caledonian Football Federation) AS Mont-Dore
6	MF	David Béaruné	17 June 1994 (aged 21)	0	0	(New Caledonian Football Federation) Gaïtcha FCN
7	FW	Leon Wahnawe	25 January 1993 (aged 22)	0	0	(New Caledonian Football Federation) Tiga Sport
8	FW	Shaffy Mandaoue	29 January 1995 (aged 20)	0	0	(New Caledonian Football Federation) A.S. Lössi
9	FW	Jim Ouka	25 June 1996 (aged 19)	0	0	(New Caledonian Football Federation) Gaïtcha FCN
10	MF	Cédric Decoire	15 May 1994 (aged 21)	0	0	(French Football Federation) OFC Charleville
11	FW	Raphael Oiremon	22 May 1995 (aged 20)	1	0	(New Caledonian Football Federation) AS Mont-Dore
12	MF	Yorick Hnautra	23 February 1994 (aged 21)	0	0	(New Caledonian Football Federation) A.S. Lössi
13	DF	Joseph Tchako	30 March 1993 (aged 22)	0	0	(New Caledonian Football Federation) AS Mont-Dore
14	MF	Nathaniel Hmaen	4 August 1993 (aged 21)	1	0	(New Caledonian Football Federation) Tiga Sport
15	MF	Joseph Athale	11 July 1995 (aged 19)	1	0	(New Caledonian Football Federation) AS Wetr
16	GK	Jimmy Wahnapo	28 May 1996 (aged 19)	0	0	(New Caledonian Football Federation) AS Wetr
17	MF	Ben Malakai	8 November 1995 (aged 19)	0	0	(New Caledonian Football Federation) AS Mont-Dore
18	DF	Pierre Kauma	4 August 1995 (aged 19)	1	0	(New Caledonian Football Federation) A.S. Lössi
19	MF	Mickaël Partodikromo	2 February 1996 (aged 19)	0	0	(New Zealand Football) Team Wellington
20	MF	Johan Idrele	29 January 1995 (aged 20)	1	0	(New Caledonian Football Federation) AS Wetr
21	GK	Jacques Nykeine	9 February 1996 (aged 19)	0	0	(New Caledonian Football Federation) Tiga Sports
22	DF	Théo Jalabert	22 December 1996 (aged 18)	0	0	(New Caledonian Football Federation) AS Mont-Dore
23	MF	Vince Poithily	30 November 1992 (aged 22)	1	0	(New Caledonian Football Federation) Belep Mont-Dore

=== New Zealand ===
Head coach: (England) Anthony Hudson

No.	Pos.	Player	Date of birth (age)	Caps	Goals	Club
1	GK	Oliver Sail	13 January 1996 (aged 19)	0	0	(New Zealand Football) Wellington Phoenix
2	DF	Kip Colvey	15 March 1994 (aged 21)	0	0	(United States Soccer Federation) Cal Poly Mustangs
3	DF	**Deklan Wynne**	20 March 1995 (aged 20)	0	0	(New Zealand Football) Wanderers SC
4	DF	Sam Brotherton	2 October 1996 (aged 18)	0	0	(New Zealand Football) Wanderers SC
5	DF	Alec Solomons	15 September 1993 (aged 21)	0	0	(New Zealand Football) Waitakere United
6	MF	**Bill Tuiloma**	27 March 1995 (aged 20)	0	0	(French Football Federation) Olympique de Marseille
7	FW	**Joel Stevens**	7 February 1995 (aged 20)	0	0	(New Zealand Football) Wellington Phoenix
8	MF	**Moses Dyer**	21 March 1997 (aged 18)	0	0	(New Zealand Football) Wanderers SC
9	FW	Alex Rufer	12 June 1996 (aged 19)	0	0	(New Zealand Football) Wellington Phoenix
10	MF	**Clayton Lewis**	12 February 1997 (aged 18)	0	0	(New Zealand Football) Wanderers SC
11	MF	Luka Prelevic	7 September 1995 (aged 19)	0	0	(Football Australia) Melbourne City
12	GK	Nikola Tzanev	23 December 1996 (aged 18)	0	0	(The Football Association) Brentford
13	DF	Liam Higgins	27 September 1993 (aged 21)	0	0	(New Zealand Football) WaiBOP United
14	DF	Luke Adams	8 May 1994 (aged 21)	0	0	(Football Australia) South Melbourne FC
15	DF	**Storm Roux**	13 January 1993 (aged 22)	0	0	(Football Australia) Central Coast Mariners
16	MF	**Louis Fenton**	3 April 1993 (aged 22)	4	3	(New Zealand Football) Wellington Phoenix
17	MF	Andrew Blake	14 March 1996 (aged 19)	0	0	(New Zealand Football) Wellington Phoenix
18	MF	Sam Burfoot	10 April 1994 (aged 21)	0	0	(New Zealand Football) Auckland City
19	FW	Monty Patterson	9 December 1996 (aged 18)	0	0	(The Football Association) Ipswich Town
20	DF	Harshae Raniga	1 October 1994 (aged 20)	0	0	(New Zealand Football) Waitakere United
21	GK	Max Crocombe	12 August 1993 (aged 21)	0	0	(The Football Association) Oxford United
22	MF	Te Atawhai Hudson-Wihongi	27 March 1995 (aged 20)	0	0	(New Zealand Football) Wanderers SC
23	FW	Logan Rogerson	28 May 1998 (aged 17)	0	0	(New Zealand Football) Wellington Phoenix

=== Papua New Guinea ===
Head coach: (New Zealand) Ricki Herbert

No.	Pos.	Player	Date of birth (age)	Caps	Goals	Club
1	GK	Ishmael Pole	25 January 1993 (aged 22)	0	0	(Papua New Guinea Football Association) Hekari United
2	DF	Abel Redenut	27 April 1995 (aged 20)	0	0	(Papua New Guinea Football Association) FC Port Moresby
3	DF	Otto Kusunan	29 June 1993 (aged 22)	0	0	(Papua New Guinea Football Association) Besta United PNG
4	DF	Joshua Talau	19 April 1996 (aged 19)	0	0	(Papua New Guinea Football Association) Besta United PNG
5	DF	John Ray	21 January 1997 (aged 18)	0	0	(Papua New Guinea Football Association) Besta United PNG
6	FW	Emmanuel Airem	22 November 1994 (aged 20)	0	0	(Papua New Guinea Football Association) Hekari United
7	MF	Freddy Steven	8 September 1993 (aged 21)	0	0	(Papua New Guinea Football Association) Besta United PNG
8	DF	Sammy Rufus	4 March 1993 (aged 22)	0	0	
9	FW	Patrick Aisa	6 July 1994 (aged 20)	0	0	(Papua New Guinea Football Association) Oro
10	MF	Rodney Mobiha	1 February 1994 (aged 21)	0	0	(Papua New Guinea Football Association) Admiralty
11	FW	Emmanuel Yawi	17 July 1993 (aged 21)	0	0	
12	MF	Darren Steven	4 June 1994 (aged 21)	0	0	
13	FW	Tommy Semmy	30 September 1994 (aged 20)	0	0	(Papua New Guinea Football Association) Hekari United
14	MF	Alwin Komolong	2 November 1994 (aged 20)	0	0	(Papua New Guinea Football Association) Madang
15	DF	Vincent Worio	6 December 1993 (aged 21)	0	0	(Papua New Guinea Football Association) Madang
16	DF	Felix Komolong	6 March 1997 (aged 18)	0	0	(Papua New Guinea Football Association) Madang
17	MF	Jacob Sabua	25 August 1994 (aged 20)	0	0	(Papua New Guinea Football Association) Oro
18	MF	Basil Jofari	15 January 1994 (aged 21)	0	0	(Papua New Guinea Football Association) FC Port Moresby
19	FW	Pettyshen Elijah	12 July 1993 (aged 21)	0	0	(Papua New Guinea Football Association) Admiralty
20	GK	Charles Lepani	20 August 1994 (aged 20)	0	0	(Papua New Guinea Football Association) FC Port Moresby
21	MF	Nathan James	4 July 1995 (aged 20)	0	0	(Papua New Guinea Football Association) Besta United PNG
22	MF	Gimale Essacu	31 December 1997 (aged 17)	0	0	(Football Australia) Canberra City
23	MF	Papalau Awele	1 February 1995 (aged 20)	0	0	(Papua New Guinea Football Association) Besta United PNG

=== Solomon Islands ===
Head coach: Patrick Miniti

No.	Pos.	Player	Date of birth (age)	Caps	Goals	Club
1	GK	Philip Mango	28 August 1995 (aged 19)	2	0	(Solomon Islands Football Federation) Western United
2	DF	Fred Buai	11 August 1994 (age 32)	3	0	
3	DF	Matson Fenny	16 December 1993 (aged 21)	3	0	(Solomon Islands Football Federation) Solomon Warriors
4	DF	Dickson Mouli	3 May 1993 (age 33)	0	0	(Solomon Islands Football Federation) Real Kakamora FC
5	DF	Allen Peter	11 September 1995 (aged 19)	3	0	(Solomon Islands Football Federation) Malaita Kingz
6	MF	Fredrick Dola	6 April 1994 (aged 21)	0	0	(Solomon Islands Football Federation) Marist Fire
7	FW	Harrison Mala	14 July 1994 (aged 20)	3	0	(Solomon Islands Football Federation) Kossa
8	MF	Jimmy Raramane	11 February 1994 (aged 21)	0	0	(Solomon Islands Football Federation) Kossa
9	FW	Frank Foli	20 September 1994 (age 32)	0	0	(Solomon Islands Football Federation) Hana
10	FW	Tutizama Tanito	27 November 1993 (aged 21)	3	1	(Papua New Guinea Football Association) Hekari United
11	FW	Atana Fa'arado	3 November 1994 (aged 20)	3	0	(Solomon Islands Football Federation) Koloale FC Honiara
12	DF	George Ladoga	19 November 1994 (aged 20)	0	0	(Solomon Islands Football Federation) X-Beam
13	MF	Jared Rangosulia	6 November 1995 (aged 19)	0	0	(Solomon Islands Football Federation) Koloale FC Honiara
14	FW	Boni Pride	10 September 1995 (age 31)	1	0	(Solomon Islands Football Federation) Henderson Eels
15	DF	John Rofeta	2 September 1994 (age 32)	1	0	(Solomon Islands Football Federation) Marist
16	DF	Fred Bala (c)	10 July 1995 (aged 19)	0	0	(Solomon Islands Football Federation) Malaita Kingz
17	MF	Timothy Bakale	29 March 1995 (aged 20)	3	0	(Solomon Islands Football Federation) Western United
18	DF	Davidson Tome	17 May 1994 (age 32)	4	0	(Solomon Islands Football Federation) Marist
19	DF	Simon Daoi	8 January 1996 (age 30)	3	0	(Solomon Islands Football Federation) Marist
20	GK	Anthony Talo	8 January 1996 (age 30)	1	0	(Solomon Islands Football Federation) Western United
21	DF	Natanela Bero	28 November 1994 (age 31)	1	0	(Solomon Islands Football Federation) Marist
22	FW	Kevin Obed	4 April 1996 (aged 19)	0	0	(New Zealand Football) Nelson Falcons
23	GK	James Do'oro	19 June 1995 (age 31)	0	0	(Solomon Islands Football Federation) Henderson Eels
