= 2016 OFC Nations Cup squads =

For the 2016 OFC Nations Cup, the 8 participating national teams had to submit squads of 23 players – of which three had to be goalkeepers.

The age listed for each player is on 28 May 2016, the first day of the tournament. The number of caps listed for each player does not include any matches played after the start of the 2016 OFC Nations Cup. The club listed is the club for which the player last played a competitive match prior to the tournament.

== Group A ==
=== Tahiti ===
Coach: (France) Ludovic Graugnard

No.	Pos.	Player	Date of birth (age)	Caps	Goals	Club
1	GK	Mikaël Roche	24 December 1982 (aged 33)	7	0	(Tahitian Football Federation) A.S. Tefana
2	DF	Taumihau Tiatia	25 July 1991 (aged 24)	0	0	(Tahitian Football Federation) A.S. Tefana
4	DF	Ricky Aitamai	22 December 1991 (aged 24)	4	0	(Tahitian Football Federation) A.S. Vénus
5	DF	Rainui Aroita	25 January 1994 (aged 22)	1	0	(Tahitian Football Federation) A.S. Tamarii Faa'a
6	MF	Henri Caroine	7 September 1981 (aged 34)	9	0	(New Caledonian Football Federation) Horizon Patho
7	MF	Temarii Tinorua	4 September 1986 (aged 29)	10	2	(Tahitian Football Federation) A.S. Tefana
8	FW	Tauatua Lucas	23 November 1994 (aged 21)	3	1	(Tahitian Football Federation) A.S. Tefana
9	MF	Tauhiti Keck	1 August 1994 (aged 21)	1	0	(Tahitian Football Federation) A.S. Tefana
10	FW	Teaonui Tehau	1 September 1992 (aged 23)	17	8	(Tahitian Football Federation) A.S. Pirae
11	MF	Jay Warren	4 May 1989 (aged 27)	1	0	(Tahitian Football Federation) A.S. Pirae
12	MF	Mauarii Tehina	16 October 1993 (aged 22)	0	0	(Tahitian Football Federation) A.S. Vénus
13	FW	Steevy Chong Hue	26 January 1990 (aged 26)	22	7	(Tahitian Football Federation) A.S. Tefana
14	DF	Matatia Paama	3 October 1992 (aged 23)	0	0	(Tahitian Football Federation) A.S. Central Sport
15	MF	Heimano Bourebare	15 May 1989 (aged 27)	14	1	(Tahitian Football Federation) A.S. Tefana
16	GK	Bruno Tetuanui	26 May 1982 (aged 34)	0	0	(Tahitian Football Federation) A.S. Central Sport
17	MF	Tamatoa Tetauira	17 April 1996 (aged 20)	0	0	(Tahitian Football Federation) A.S. Dragon
18	DF	Tefai Fehau	26 February 1988 (aged 28)	0	0	(Tahitian Football Federation) A.S. Vénus
19	DF	Vincent Simon	28 September 1983 (aged 32)	23	1	(Tahitian Football Federation) A.S. Pirae
20	MF	Alvin Tehau	10 April 1989 (aged 27)	18	6	(Tahitian Football Federation) A.S. Tefana
21	FW	Fred Tissot	14 July 1995 (aged 20)	0	0	(Tahitian Football Federation) A.S. Central Sport
22	DF	Nicolas Vallar (Captain)	22 October 1983 (aged 32)	15	4	(Tahitian Football Federation) A.S. Tefana

=== New Caledonia ===
Coach: (France) Thierry Sardo

No.	Pos.	Player	Date of birth (age)	Caps	Goals	Club
1	GK	Dimitri Petemou	3 August 1980 (aged 35)	2	0	(New Caledonian Football Federation) Baco
2	DF	Judikael Ixoée	7 March 1990 (aged 26)	11	1	(French Football Federation) Carqueiranne
3	DF	Joseph Tchako	30 March 1993 (aged 23)	2	0	(New Caledonian Football Federation) Mont-Dore
4	DF	Georges Béaruné	27 July 1989 (aged 26)	12	1	(New Caledonian Football Federation) Magenta
5	DF	Kevin Nemia	31 July 1989 (aged 26)	0	0	(New Caledonian Football Federation) Magenta
6	MF	Cédric Sansot	13 April 1989 (aged 27)	2	0	(New Caledonian Football Federation) Magenta
7	MF	Joël Wakanumuné	30 September 1986 (aged 29)	18	1	(New Caledonian Football Federation) Magenta
8	MF	Roy Kayara	2 May 1990 (aged 26)	21	6	(New Caledonian Football Federation) Hienghène Sport
9	FW	Jean-Philippe Saïko	20 August 1990 (aged 25)	0	0	(French Football Federation) Poitiers
10	MF	César Zeoula	29 August 1989 (aged 26)	24	9	(French Football Federation) Stade Lavallois
11	FW	Bertrand Kaï	6 June 1983 (aged 32)	31	20	(New Caledonian Football Federation) Hienghène Sport
12	DF	Loic Wakanumuné	27 March 1985 (aged 31)	2	0	(New Caledonian Football Federation) Magenta
13	DF	Jean-Brice Wadriako	15 January 1993 (aged 23)	1	0	(New Caledonian Football Federation) Magenta
14	MF	Jacky Meindu	6 June 1989 (aged 26)	1	0	(New Caledonian Football Federation) Nouméa
15	MF	Joerisse Cexome	19 January 1990 (aged 26)	2	0	(New Caledonian Football Federation) Lössi
16	DF	Jean-Christ Wajoka	6 September 1992 (aged 23)	2	0	(New Caledonian Football Federation) Magenta
17	FW	Brice Dahité	21 June 1991 (aged 24)	2	0	(New Caledonian Football Federation) Hienghène Sport
18	DF	Emile Béaruné	7 February 1990 (aged 26)	25	1	(New Caledonian Football Federation) Horizon Patho
19	MF	Joseph Athale	11 July 1995 (aged 20)	2	0	(New Caledonian Football Federation) Wetr
20	GK	Thomas Schmidt	4 June 1996 (aged 19)	2	0	(New Caledonian Football Federation) Lössi
21	FW	Georges Gope-Fenepej	23 October 1988 (aged 27)	16	15	(French Football Federation) Amiens
23	GK	Steve Ixoée	6 June 1988 (aged 27)	1	0	(New Caledonian Football Federation) Magenta

=== Samoa ===
Coach: (New Zealand) Scott Easthope

No.	Pos.	Player	Date of birth (age)	Caps	Goals	Club
1	GK	Faalavelave Matagi	13 March 1997 (aged 19)	1	0	(Football Federation Samoa) Vaitele Uta
2	FW	Johnny Hall	16 February 1991 (aged 25)	3	2	(Football Australia) Brookvale
3	DF	Kaipo Tagaloa	24 March 1993 (aged 23)	0	0	(United States Soccer Federation) Maui Sabers
4	DF	Filipo Bureta	5 March 1983 (aged 33)	11	0	(New Zealand Football) Clendon United
5	DF	Jarrell Sale	16 September 1984 (aged 31)	13	0	(Football Federation Samoa) Kiwi FC
6	MF	Ryan Martin	4 September 1993 (aged 22)	0	0	(New Zealand Football) Onehunga Sports
7	MF	Andrew Mobberley	10 March 1992 (aged 24)	3	2	(New Zealand Football) Southern United
8	MF	Cameron Martin	15 September 1994 (aged 21)	0	0	(New Zealand Football) Onehunga Sports
9	MF	Paulo Scanlan	9 August 1996 (aged 19)	0	0	(Football Federation Samoa) Vaipuna
10	FW	Desmond Fa'aiuaso	24 February 1984 (aged 32)	14	7	(Football Federation Samoa) Strickland Brothers Lepea
11	FW	Jai Ingham	14 August 1993 (aged 22)	0	0	(Football Australia) Melbourne Victory
12	FW	Mike Saofaiga	12 January 1991 (aged 25)	5	0	(Football Federation Samoa) Kiwi FC
13	MF	Lionel Taylor	22 January 1984 (aged 32)	12	1	(Football Federation Samoa) Kiwi FC
14	MF	Keone Kapisi	19 April 1994 (aged 22)	0	0	(United States Soccer Federation) Maui Sabers
15	FW	Luki Gosche	13 January 1986 (aged 30)	3	2	(Football Federation Samoa) Kiwi FC
16	DF	Marcus Alimonti	4 July 1997 (aged 18)	0	0	(Football Australia) Dulwich Hill
17	MF	Joseph Dan-Tyrell	24 May 1994 (aged 22)	3	0	(New Zealand Football) Central United
18	DF	Henry Pupi	23 January 1993 (aged 23)	1	0	(Football Federation Samoa) Vaitele Uta
19	FW	Lapalapa Toni	7 April 1994 (aged 22)	1	0	(Football Federation Samoa) Lupe o le Soaga
20	MF	Silao Malo	30 December 1990 (aged 25)	9	2	(Football Federation Samoa) Vaimoso
21	MF	Samuelu Malo	4 April 1999 (aged 17)	0	0	(Football Federation Samoa) Samoa Football Academy
22	GK	Charlie Tapelu	22 July 1993 (aged 22)	0	0	(Football Federation Samoa) Vaitele Uta
23	GK	Ted Sikovi	26 May 1983 (aged 33)	0	0	(Football Federation Samoa) Lupe o le Soaga

=== Papua New Guinea ===
Coach: (Denmark) Flemming Serritslev

No.	Pos.	Player	Date of birth (age)	Caps	Goals	Club
1	GK	Ishmael Pole	25 January 1993 (aged 23)	0	0	(Papua New Guinea Football Association) Hekari United
2	DF	Daniel Joe	29 May 1990 (aged 25)	4	0	(Papua New Guinea Football Association) Hekari United
3	DF	Valentine Nelson	12 April 1987 (aged 29)	10	0	(Papua New Guinea Football Association) Lae City Dwellers
4	MF	Alwin Komolong	2 November 1994 (aged 21)	0	0	(United States Soccer Federation) Northern Kentucky University
5	DF	Felix Komolong	6 March 1997 (aged 19)	2	0	(Papua New Guinea Football Association) Hekari United
6	FW	Patrick Aisa	6 July 1994 (aged 21)	1	0	(Papua New Guinea Football Association) Rapatona
7	FW	Raymond Gunemba	10 December 1989 (aged 26)	6	2	(Papua New Guinea Football Association) Lae City Dwellers
8	MF	Michael Foster	5 September 1985 (aged 30)	11	3	(Papua New Guinea Football Association) Lae City Dwellers
9	FW	Nigel Dabinyaba	26 October 1992 (aged 23)	3	0	(Papua New Guinea Football Association) Lae City Dwellers
10	MF	Obert Bika	11 May 1993 (aged 23)	1	0	(Papua New Guinea Football Association) Lae City Dwellers
11	MF	Wira Wama	24 October 1989 (aged 26)	2	0	(Papua New Guinea Football Association) Hekari United
12	MF	David Muta (Captain)	24 October 1987 (aged 28)	9	1	(Papua New Guinea Football Association) Hekari United
13	DF	Roland Bala	18 September 1990 (aged 25)	0	0	(Papua New Guinea Football Association) FC Port Moresby
14	MF	Emmanuel Simon	25 December 1992 (aged 23)	1	0	(Papua New Guinea Football Association) Hekari United
15	DF	Philip Steven	19 January 1995 (aged 21)	2	0	(Papua New Guinea Football Association) Rapatona
16	DF	Jeremy Yasasa	27 March 1985 (aged 31)	9	2	(Papua New Guinea Football Association) Hekari United
17	MF	Jacob Sabua	25 August 1994 (aged 21)	0	0	(Papua New Guinea Football Association) FC Port Moresby
18	FW	Tommy Semmy	30 September 1994 (aged 21)	4	0	(Papua New Guinea Football Association) Hekari United
19	DF	Koriak Upaiga	13 June 1987 (aged 28)	7	0	(Papua New Guinea Football Association) Hekari United
20	GK	Ronald Warisan	20 September 1989 (aged 26)	3	0	(Papua New Guinea Football Association) Lae City Dwellers
21	DF	Sammie Campbell	27 July 1986 (aged 29)	0	0	(Papua New Guinea Football Association) Hekari United
22	DF	Otto Kusunan	29 July 1993 (aged 22)	0	0	(Papua New Guinea Football Association) Hekari United
23	GK	Leslie Kalai	6 December 1984 (aged 31)	6	0	(Papua New Guinea Football Association) Hekari United

== Group B ==
=== Fiji ===
Coach: (Australia) Frank Farina

No.	Pos.	Player	Date of birth (age)	Caps	Goals	Club
1	GK	Simione Tamanisau	5 June 1982 (aged 33)	30	0	(Fiji Football Association) Rewa
2	DF	Avinesh Suwamy	6 April 1986 (aged 30)	14	2	(Fiji Football Association) Ba
3	DF	Remueru Tekiate	7 August 1990 (aged 25)	3	0	(Papua New Guinea Football Association) Hekari United
4	DF	Jale Dreloa	21 April 1995 (aged 21)	4	0	(Fiji Football Association) Suva
5	FW	Rusiate Matarerega	17 February 1993 (aged 23)	0	0	(Fiji Football Association) Suva
6	MF	Nickel Chand	28 July 1995 (aged 20)	0	0	(Fiji Football Association) Suva
7	DF	Pita Bolatoga	30 November 1984 (aged 31)	17	3	(Papua New Guinea Football Association) Hekari United
8	MF	Setareki Hughes	8 June 1995 (aged 20)	0	0	(Fiji Football Association) Suva
9	FW	Roy Krishna (Captain)	20 August 1987 (aged 28)	23	15	(Football Australia) Wellington Phoenix
10	FW	Iosefo Verevou	5 January 1996 (aged 20)	2	0	(Fiji Football Association) Rewa
11	FW	Ilimotama Jese	16 March 1990 (aged 26)	4	0	(Fiji Football Association) Nadi
12	MF	Tevita Waranaivalu	16 September 1995 (aged 20)	3	1	(Fiji Football Association) Rewa
13	MF	Ilisoni Tuinawaivuvu	8 January 1991 (aged 25)	4	0	(Fiji Football Association) Labasa
14	DF	Kolinio Sivoki	10 March 1995 (aged 21)	1	0	(Fiji Football Association) Lautoka
15	FW	Samuela Nabenia	5 February 1995 (aged 21)	0	0	(Fiji Football Association) Ba
16	MF	Malakai Tiwa	3 October 1986 (aged 29)	16	5	(Fiji Football Association) Ba
17	MF	Taione Kerevanua	19 April 1991 (aged 25)	2	1	(Fiji Football Association) Labasa
18	MF	Laisenia Raura	14 October 1990 (aged 25)	1	0	(Fiji Football Association) Ba
19	DF	Amani Makoe	20 February 1991 (aged 25)	3	0	(Fiji Football Association) Rewa
20	GK	Shaneel Naidu	28 March 1995 (aged 21)	0	0	(Fiji Football Association) Ba
21	DF	Alvin Singh	9 June 1988 (aged 27)	16	1	(Fiji Football Association) Ba
22	GK	Beniamino Mateinaqara	18 August 1987 (aged 28)	7	0	(Fiji Football Association) Suva
23	DF	Samuela Kautoga	21 May 1987 (aged 29)	10	0	(Fiji Football Association) Ba

=== New Zealand ===
Coach: (England) Anthony Hudson

The final squad was announced on 12 May 2016. On 22 May, midfielder Clayton Lewis was replaced by striker Jeremy Brockie, following a possible drugs violation. On 24 May, forward Shane Smeltz was replaced by midfielder Luka Prelevic following an injury.

No.	Pos.	Player	Date of birth (age)	Caps	Goals	Club
1	GK	Stefan Marinovic	7 October 1991 (aged 24)	3	0	(German Football Association) SpVgg Unterhaching
2	DF	Kip Colvey	15 March 1994 (aged 22)	0	0	(United States Soccer Federation) San Jose Earthquakes
3	MF	Matthew Ridenton	11 March 1996 (aged 20)	1	0	(Football Australia) Wellington Phoenix
4	DF	Themistoklis Tzimopoulos	20 November 1985 (aged 30)	3	0	(Hellenic Football Federation) PAS Giannina
5	DF	Michael Boxall	18 August 1988 (aged 27)	14	0	(South African Football Association) SuperSport United
6	MF	Bill Tuiloma	23 March 1995 (aged 21)	9	0	(French Football Federation) Strasbourg
7	FW	Kosta Barbarouses	19 February 1990 (aged 26)	29	2	(Football Australia) Melbourne Victory
8	MF	Michael McGlinchey	7 January 1987 (aged 29)	33	3	(Football Australia) Wellington Phoenix
9	FW	Chris Wood (Captain)	7 December 1991 (aged 24)	39	14	(The Football Association) Leeds United
10	MF	Luka Prelevic	7 September 1995 (aged 20)	0	0	(Football Australia) Pascoe Vale
11	MF	Marco Rojas	5 November 1991 (aged 24)	22	1	(Swiss Football Association) Thun
12	GK	Max Crocombe	12 August 1993 (aged 22)	0	0	(The Football Association) Oxford United
13	FW	Monty Patterson	9 December 1996 (aged 19)	0	0	(The Football Association) Ipswich Town
14	FW	Rory Fallon	20 March 1982 (aged 34)	18	4	(The Football Association) Bristol Rovers
15	FW	Jeremy Brockie	7 October 1987 (aged 28)	47	1	(South African Football Association) Supersport United
16	MF	Louis Fenton	3 April 1993 (aged 23)	3	0	(Football Australia) Wellington Phoenix
17	DF	Luke Adams	8 May 1994 (aged 22)	0	0	(Football Australia) South Melbourne
18	DF	Sam Brotherton	2 October 1996 (aged 19)	1	0	(United States Soccer Federation) University of Wisconsin–Madison
19	DF	Tom Doyle	30 June 1992 (aged 23)	2	0	(Football Australia) Wellington Phoenix
20	MF	Te Atawhai Hudson-Wihongi	27 March 1995 (aged 21)	1	0	(New Zealand Football) Onehunga Sports
21	FW	Logan Rogerson	28 May 1998 (aged 18)	1	0	(Football Australia) Wellington Phoenix
22	MF	Moses Dyer	21 March 1997 (aged 19)	2	0	(New Zealand Football) Onehunga Sports
23	GK	Tamati Williams	19 January 1984 (aged 32)	1	0	(Royal Dutch Football Association) RKC Waalwijk

=== Vanuatu ===
Coach: Moise Poida

No.	Pos.	Player	Date of birth (age)	Caps	Goals	Club
1	GK	Seiloni Iaruel	17 April 1995 (aged 21)	4	0	(Vanuatu Football Federation) Tafea
2	DF	Brian Kaltak	30 September 1993 (aged 22)	11	3	(Vanuatu Football Federation) Erakor Golden Star
3	DF	Kevin Shem	5 December 1993 (aged 22)	6	0	(Vanuatu Football Federation) Tafea
4	DF	Jason Thomas	20 January 1997 (aged 19)	3	0	(Vanuatu Football Federation) Erakor Golden Star
5	DF	Jacques Wanemut	2 February 1992 (aged 24)	1	0	(Vanuatu Football Federation) Erakor Golden Star
6	DF	Ignace Iamak	23 March 1990 (aged 26)	3	0	(Vanuatu Football Federation) Tafea
7	DF	Samuel Kaloros	16 September 1989 (aged 26)	1	0	(Vanuatu Football Federation) Erakor Golden Star
8	DF	Remy Kalsrap	20 January 1996 (aged 20)	2	0	(Vanuatu Football Federation) Erakor Golden Star
9	MF	Bill Nicholls	3 June 1993 (aged 22)	2	1	(Vanuatu Football Federation) Tupuji Imere
10	MF	Dominique Fred	21 October 1992 (aged 23)	5	0	(Vanuatu Football Federation) Amicale
11	MF	Raoul Coulon	3 December 1995 (aged 20)	1	0	(Vanuatu Football Federation) Tupuji Imere
12	MF	Zica Manuhi	23 July 1993 (aged 22)	1	0	(Vanuatu Football Federation) Tafea
13	MF	Nemani Roqara	9 June 1993 (aged 22)	2	0	(Vanuatu Football Federation) Erakor Golden Star
14	MF	Bong Kalo	18 January 1997 (aged 19)	2	0	(Vanuatu Football Federation) Tafea
15	MF	Daniel Natou	25 November 1989 (aged 26)	5	0	(Solomon Islands Football Federation) Solomon Warriors
16	FW	Tony Kaltak	5 September 1996 (aged 19)	2	1	(Vanuatu Football Federation) Erakor Golden Star
17	FW	Jean Kaltak	19 August 1994 (aged 21)	8	9	(Vanuatu Football Federation) Erakor Golden Star
18	FW	Fenedy Masauvakalo	4 November 1985 (aged 30)	12	1	(Vanuatu Football Federation) Amicale
19	FW	Kensi Tangis	20 January 1990 (aged 26)	13	2	(Solomon Islands Football Federation) Solomon Warriors
20	GK	Chikau Mansale	13 January 1983 (aged 33)	16	0	(Papua New Guinea Football Association) Hekari United
21	GK	Kaloran Firiam	10 December 1994 (aged 21)	0	0	(Vanuatu Football Federation) Tafea
22	MF	Jacky Ruben	24 June 1996 (aged 19)	2	0	(Vanuatu Football Federation) Erakor Golden Star
23	FW	Don Mansale	10 October 1991 (aged 24)	3	0	(Vanuatu Football Federation) Tupuji Imere

=== Solomon Islands ===
Coach: Moses Toata

No.	Pos.	Player	Date of birth (age)	Caps	Goals	Club
1	GK	Philip Mango	28 August 1995 (aged 20)	2	0	(Solomon Islands Football Federation) Marist Fire
2	DF	Hadisi Aengari	23 October 1988 (aged 27)	2	0	(Solomon Islands Football Federation) Solomon Warriors
3	DF	Bata Furai	4 January 1985 (aged 31)	1	0	(Solomon Islands Football Federation) Solomon Warriors
4	DF	Fred Fakari	9 November 1989 (aged 26)	2	0	(Solomon Islands Football Federation) Solomon Warriors
5	DF	Freddie Kini	27 November 1992 (aged 23)	6	0	(Vanuatu Football Federation) Amicale
6	DF	Allen Peter	11 September 1995 (aged 20)	1	0	(Solomon Islands Football Federation) Malaita Kingz
7	FW	Dennis Ifunaoa	9 November 1991 (aged 24)	2	0	(Solomon Islands Football Federation) Solomon Warriors
8	MF	Paul Wale	9 July 1985 (aged 30)	0	0	(Solomon Islands Football Federation) Koloale FC Honiara
9	FW	Benjamin Totori	20 February 1986 (aged 30)	27	16	(Solomon Islands Football Federation) Western United
10	MF	Judd Molea	23 August 1988 (aged 27)	7	1	(Solomon Islands Football Federation) Western United
11	MF	Micah Lea'alafa	1 June 1991 (aged 24)	2	1	(New Zealand Football) Auckland City
12	GK	Samson Koti	11 December 1991 (aged 24)	5	0	(Solomon Islands Football Federation) Solomon Warriors
13	FW	James Naka	9 October 1984 (aged 31)	16	3	(Vanuatu Football Federation) Amicale
14	MF	Moffat Kilifa	17 November 1990 (aged 25)	1	0	(Vanuatu Football Federation) Ifira Black Bird
15	FW	Jerry Donga	31 January 1991 (aged 25)	0	0	(Solomon Islands Football Federation) Solomon Warriors
16	FW	Gagame Feni	21 August 1992 (aged 23)	2	0	(Solomon Islands Football Federation) Western United
17	DF	Nelson Sale Kilifa	7 October 1986 (aged 29)	27	0	(Vanuatu Football Federation) Amicale
18	MF	Henry Fa'arodo (Captain)	5 October 1982 (aged 33)	40	15	(Solomon Islands Football Federation) Western United
19	MF	Gibson Daudau	3 September 1988 (aged 27)	1	0	(Solomon Islands Football Federation) Solomon Warriors
20	MF	Charlie Otainao	5 June 1992 (aged 23)	2	0	(Solomon Islands Football Federation) Kossa
22	MF	Joses Nawo	3 May 1988 (aged 28)	15	4	(Papua New Guinea Football Association) Hekari United
23	GK	James Do'oro	19 June 1995 (aged 20)	0	0	(Solomon Islands Football Federation) Kossa

== Player representation ==
=== By club nationality ===
Nations in italics are not represented by their national teams in the finals

Players	Clubs
26	Papua New Guinea
24	Vanuatu
20	Fiji, (French Polynesia) Tahiti
19	New Caledonia
18	Solomon Islands
13	Samoa
11	Australia
7	New Zealand
5	United States
4	England, France
2	South Africa
1	Germany, Greece, Netherlands, Switzerland
