= 2013 OFC U-20 Championship squads =

Association football team rosters for the 2013 OFC U-20 Championship, the Oceanic Youth Championship.

== Fiji ==
Coach: (Fiji) Ravinesh Kumar

No.	Pos.	Player	Date of birth (age)	Caps	Goals	Club
1	GK	Tevita Koroi	April 12, 1994 (age 31)	3	0	Unattached
20	GK	Senirusi Bokini	June 2, 1994 (age 31)	2	0	Unattached
2	DF	Antonio Tuivuna	March 20, 1995 (age 30)	3	0	(Fiji) Unattached
3	DF	Praneel Naidu	January 29, 1995 (age 30)	4	0	(Fiji) Ba FC
4	DF	Jale Dreloa	April 21, 1995 (age 30)	4	0	Unattached
6	DF	Kolinio Sivoki (c)	March 10, 1995 (age 30)	3	0	(Fiji) Rewa FC
11	DF	Jope Masibalavu	May 21, 1993 (age 32)	3	0	(Fiji) Ba FC
14	DF	Josaia Masiwini	November 24, 1994 (age 30)	2	0	(Fiji) Rewa FC
16	DF	Sakaraia Naisua	March 9, 1993 (age 32)	4	0	(Fiji) Ba FC
17	DF	Ravinesh Dass	November 2, 1993 (age 31)	2	0	Unattached
7	MF	Vineel Naidu	May 28, 1994 (age 31)	2	0	Unattached
8	MF	Setareki Hughes	June 8, 1995 (age 30)	2	0	(Fiji) Rewa FC
9	MF	Manasa Nawakula	March 6, 1994 (age 31)	3	0	(Fiji) Ba FC
10	MF	Narendra Rao	June 27, 1995 (age 30)	4	1	(Fiji) Ba FC
12	MF	Ratu Nakalevu	March 7, 1994 (age 31)	2	1	(Fiji) Rewa FC
19	MF	Temesi Tuwai		3	0	(Fiji) Nadi FC
5	FW	Rusiate Matarerega	January 17, 1993 (age 32)	4	5	(Fiji) Nadi FC
13	FW	Jone Salauneune	August 8, 1993 (age 32)	6	3	(Fiji) Ba
15	FW	Napolioni Qasevakatini	March 17, 1993 (age 32)	3	1	(Fiji) Nadi FC
18	FW	Tomasi Tuicakau	June 27, 1993 (age 32)	2	0	(Fiji) Nadroga F.C.

== New Caledonia ==
Coach: (France) Matthieu Delcroix

No.	Pos.	Player	Date of birth (age)	Caps	Goals	Club
1	GK	Anthony Ajapuhnya	16 May 1993 (age 32)	3	0	(New Caledonia) AS Wetr
20	GK	Emmanuel Hnasson	February 26, 1994 (age 31)	1	0	(New Caledonia) SC Ne Drehu
2	DF	Ernest Maperi	9 May 1993 (age 32)	4	0	(New Caledonia) CA Saint-Louis
3	DF	Matthieu Patritti	20 May 1994 (age 31)	2	0	(New Caledonia) FC Auteuil
4	DF	Jean-Brice Wadriako	January 15, 1993 (age 32)	4	2	(New Caledonia) AS Magenta
5	DF	Aquilas Wahnapo	25 April 1993 (age 32)	4	0	(New Caledonia) FC Auteuil
12	DF	Albert Bouanaoue	10 May 1994 (age 31)	0	0	(New Caledonia) AS Grand Nord
17	DF	Bernard Streiff	March 1, 1994 (age 31)	1	0	(New Caledonia) OMS Paita
6	MF	Fonzy Ranchain	22 July 1994 (age 31)	4	2	(New Caledonia) AS Lössi
7	MF	Ben Malakai	8 November 1995 (age 29)	2	0	(New Caledonia) AS Mont-Dore
10	MF	Jordy Xalite	March 24, 1993 (age 32)	6	3	(New Caledonia) AS Magenta
13	MF	Jean-Pierre Bob	March 29, 1994 (age 31)	2	2	(New Caledonia) AS Mont-Dore
14	MF	Cedric Decoire	15 May 1994 (age 31)	2	1	(New Caledonia) AS Mont-Dore
15	MF	Geordy Gony	15 May 1994 (age 31)	3	0	(New Caledonia) FC Auteuil
18	MF	David Wadra	29 July 1994 (age 31)	3	1	(New Caledonia) AS Mont-Dore
19	MF	Louis Waia	13 July 1993 (age 32)	3	0	(New Caledonia) AS Mont-Dore
11	MF	Stéphane Tein-Padom	8 June 1994 (age 31)	3	0	(France) LB Châteauroux II
8	FW	Michel Wassin	December 4, 1994 (age 30)	4	0	(New Caledonia) AS Lössi
9	FW	Bernard Waelua	February 4, 1994 (age 31)	3	2	(New Caledonia) FC Auteuil
16	FW	Renaldo Nonmeu	17 August 1994 (age 31)	4	1	(New Caledonia) AS Thio Sport

== New Zealand ==
Coach: (New Zealand) Chris Milicich

No.	Pos.	Player	Date of birth (age)	Caps	Club
1	GK	Scott Basalaj	19 April 1994 (aged 18)		(New Zealand) Team Wellington
2	DF	Storm Roux	13 January 1993 (aged 20)		(Australia) Perth Glory
3	DF	Bill Tuiloma	27 March 1995 (aged 17)		(New Zealand) Birkenhead United
4	DF	Simon Arms	21 March 1993 (aged 20)		(New Zealand) Auckland City FC
5	DF	Luke Adams	8 May 1994 (aged 18)		(England) Derby County
6	MF	Tom Biss	20 January 1993 (aged 20)		(New Zealand) Team Wellington
7	MF	Cameron Howieson	22 December 1994 (aged 18)		(England) Burnley
8	MF	Jesse Edge	26 February 1995 (aged 18)		(New Zealand) Waikato FC
9	FW	Hamish Watson	17 April 1993 (aged 19)		(New Zealand) Team Wellington
10	FW	Tyler Boyd	30 December 1994 (aged 18)		(New Zealand) Wellington Phoenix
11	MF	Louis Fenton	3 April 1993 (aged 19)		(New Zealand) Wellington Phoenix
12	FW	Rory Turner	19 July 1994 (aged 18)		(New Zealand) Waikato FC
13	DF	Liam Higgins	27 September 1993 (aged 19)		(New Zealand) YoungHeart Manawatu
14	DF	Kade Schrijvers	18 April 1993 (aged 19)		(New Zealand) YoungHeart Manawatu
15	MF	Justin Gulley	15 January 1993 (aged 20)		(New Zealand) Team Wellington
16	FW	Van Elia	1 July 1993 (aged 19)		(New Zealand) Team Wellington
17	MF	Ryan Thomas	20 December 1994 (aged 18)		(New Zealand) Waikato FC
18	MF	Joel Stevens	7 February 1995 (aged 18)		(New Zealand) Otago United
19	FW	Dale Higham	4 January 1993 (aged 20)		(New Zealand) YoungHeart Manawatu
20	GK	Max Crocombe	12 August 1993 (aged 19)		(England) Oxford United

== Papua New Guinea ==
Coach: (Papua New Guinea) Wesley Waiwai

No.	Pos.	Player	Date of birth (age)	Caps	Goals	Club
1	GK	Charles Lepani	20 August 1994 (age 31)	3	0	(Papua New Guinea) FC Port Moresby
20	GK	Ishmael Pole	January 25, 1993 (age 32)	0	0	(Papua New Guinea) Hekari United
6	DF	Emmanuel Airem	22 November 1994 (age 30)	3	1	(Papua New Guinea) Besta United PNG
2	DF	John Ray	21 January 1997 (age 28)	3	0	(Papua New Guinea) Eastern Stars FC
4	DF	Ayrton Yagas	July 3, 1996 (age 29)	3	0	(Papua New Guinea) FC Port Moresby
5	DF	Otto Kusunani	29 July 1993 (age 32)	2	0	(Papua New Guinea) Besta United PNG
15	DF	Philip Steven	19 January 1995 (age 30)	3	0	(Papua New Guinea) Besta United PNG
11	DF	Sana Yatu	18 March 1993 (age 32)	1	0	(Papua New Guinea) PSSA
10	MF	Charkstan Aopi	22 November 1995 (age 29)	1	0	(Papua New Guinea) Oro FC
19	MF	Pettyshen Elijah	12 July 1993 (age 32)	2	0	(Papua New Guinea) Oro FC
17	MF	Jacob Sabua	August 25, 1994 (age 31)	5	0	(Papua New Guinea) Besta United PNG
5	MF	Daniel Taylor	October 5, 1994 (age 30)	3	0	(Papua New Guinea) Hekari United
7	MF	Raynard Yohang	4 February 1993 (age 32)	0	0	(Papua New Guinea) Hekari United
16	MF	Papalau Awele	1 February 1995 (age 30)	3	1	(Papua New Guinea) Besta United PNG
18	MF	Francis Patrick	28 December 1993 (age 31)	1	0	(Papua New Guinea) Besta United PNG
8	MF	Darren Steven	4 June 1994 (age 31)	3	0	(Papua New Guinea) Besta United PNG
12	MF	Philadelphia Vela	6 April 1993 (age 32)	0	0	(Papua New Guinea) Hekari United
9	FW	Patrick Aisa	July 6, 1994 (age 31)	3	0	(Papua New Guinea) Eastern Stars FC
11	FW	Tommy Semmy	September 30, 1994 (age 30)	1	0	(Papua New Guinea) Besta United PNG
14	FW	Alwin Komolong	2 November 1994 (age 30)	5	2	(Papua New Guinea) FC Port Moresby

== Vanuatu ==
Coach: (Vanuatu) Moise Poida

No.	Pos.	Player	Date of birth (age)	Caps	Goals	Club
1	GK	Seiloni Iaruel	17 April 1995 (aged 17)	9	0	(Vanuatu) Tafea
20	GK	Kalo Firiam	December 10, 1994 (aged 18)	0	0	(Vanuatu) Tafea
14	DF	Michel Coulon	3 December 1995 (aged 17)	3	0	(Vanuatu) Tupuji Imere F.C.
2	DF	Raoul Coulon	3 December 1995 (aged 17)	2	0	(Vanuatu) Tupuji Imere F.C.
4	DF	Jaysen Botleng	June 6, 1994 (aged 18)	4	0	(Vanuatu) Tafea
6	DF	Jais Malsarani	7 March 1994 (aged 19)	4	0	(Vanuatu) Tafea
3	DF	Chanel Obed	3 September 1995 (aged 17)	2	0	(Vanuatu) Amicale
15	DF	Eric Johnsam	May 19, 1993 (aged 19)	1	0	(Vanuatu) Shepherds United
5	DF	Kevin Shem	5 December 1993 (aged 19)	9	2	(Vanuatu) Tafea
7	MF	Barry Mansale	1 November 1995 (aged 17)	3	0	(Vanuatu) Tupuji Imere F.C.
8	MF	Jackson Tasso	27 July 1993 (aged 19)	4	1	(Vanuatu) Erakor Golden Star
18	MF	Philipe Tabilip	May 24, 1993 (aged 19)	1	1	(Vanuatu) Tafea
16	MF	Zica Manuhi	July 23, 1993 (aged 19)	4	1	(Vanuatu) Tafea
12	MF	Santino Mermer	28 May 1995 (aged 17)	1	0	(Vanuatu) Shepherds United
10	FW	Bill Nicolls	June 3, 1993 (aged 19)	4	0	(Vanuatu) Tafea
13	FW	Dalong Damilip	May 12, 1993 (aged 19)	4	4	(Vanuatu) Tafea
9	FW	Jean Kaltak	19 August 1994 (aged 18)	9	9	(Vanuatu) Erakor Golden Star
17	FW	Nicol Tari	November 29, 1994 (aged 18)	2	1	(Vanuatu) Tafea
19	FW	Edwin Bai	December 21, 1995 (aged 17)	1	0	(Vanuatu) Uripiv FC
11	FW	Ratu Hungai	October 18, 1993 (aged 19)	2	0	(Vanuatu) Tafea
