= Fiji at the 2015 Pacific Games =

- IOC code: FIJ

4 July 2015 – 18 July 2015
- Competitors: 481 in 26 sports
- Flag bearer: Apolonia Vaivai
- Medals Ranked 4th: Gold 33 Silver 45 Bronze 37 Total 115

Pacific Games appearances
- 1963; 1966; 1969; 1971; 1975; 1979; 1983; 1987; 1991; 1995; 1999; 2003; 2007; 2011; 2015; 2019; 2023

Fiji competed at the 2015 Pacific Games in Port Moresby, Papua New Guinea from 4 to 18 July 2015. A total of 481 competitors for Fiji were listed as of 4 July 2015.

== Athletics ==
4 x 100 - Female

- Younis Bese
- Elenoa Lillian Vukidonu Sailosi
- Sisilia Anisa Levu Seavula
- Makelesi Tumvu

4 x 100 - Male

- Anasa Kaito
- Ratutira Narara
- Vilisoni Romanu Uganidavui Rarasea
- Ratu Banuve Lalabalavu Tabakaucoro

== Basketball ==
Women

- Dissiola Kaseva Boseiwaqa
- Vilisi Elesi Tavui
- Bitila Sigani Tawake
- Mereleni Dreke Tora
- Hannah Cawai Camari Tuikoro
- Letava Vanui Williams Whippy
- Mickaelar Keeka Whippy
- Ada Mary Dansey
- Seini Macrae Dobui
- Tiyanna Kainamoli
- Leba Lakoisolomone Korovou
- Makilita Koyamainavure
- Miliakere Koyamainavure
- Valerie Nainima
- Amalaini Raluvenitoga

Men

- Tui Leifanau Sikivou
- William Qounadovu
- Joshua Fox
- Mataika Koyamainavure
- Johnny Eki Seruvatu
- Pita Gus Nacagilevu Sowakula
- Marques Reid Whippy
- Waymann Whippy
- Orisi Rawaqa Naivalurua
- Esala Ligani Banuve
- Kolinio Buiboto Matalau
- Leonard Everett Everett Whippy

== Beach volleyball ==
Women

- Sukannika Qaqa
- Iliseva Ratudina
- Sereia Dievo Speed
- Alitia Matanakovei Yaya

Men

- Aisake Baleimaiamerika
- Ratu Wesele Seru Sukanaveita Cawanikawai
- Raymond Stoddart

== Bodybuilding ==
No competing athletes

== Boxing ==
Fiji qualified 7 athletes in boxing

- Winston Mark Hill
- Viliame Vitu Kalulu
- Akaash Ram
- Pauliasi Ratu
- Josefa Ravudi
- Tina Anthony Ruata
- Mitieli Sefanaia Vakacegu

== Cricket ==
Fiji qualified a women's cricket team (15 players):

Women

Women's tournament.

- Miliniai Balebua
- Loma Kacilala Batinibuli
- Timaima Bulatalei
- Mere Dainitoga
- Alicia Zureen Dean
- Adi Joana Sigaiwasa Lesianawai
- Semaema Lewanivale Lomani
- Ruci Kaiwai Muriyalo
- Silipa Tikosaya Raratabu
- Luanne Notina Rika
- Luisa Vosaki Tawatatau
- Vilimaina Salusalu Tuapati
- Marica Nira Vua
- Maca Tacola Vuruna
- Ilisapeci Vulisere Waqavakatoga

== Football ==
Fiji qualified men's and women's teams in football (46 athletes):

Women

Group stage – Women's tournament.

- Vasiti Babra Patricia Adimaira
- Miriama Naiobasali
- Stella Naivalulevu
- Sonali Rao
- Laijipa Daini
- Bela Ratubalavu
- Hilda Reshmi
- Viniana Riwai
- Vasiti Kuma Solikoviti
- Jotivini Tabua
- Torika Delai
- Luisa Tamanitoakula
- Wasela Tinai
- Unaisi Tuberi
- Varanisese Namena Tuicakau
- Joana Seniuca Tuwai
- Melaia Vakawale
- Matelita Vuakoso
- Naomi Waqanidrola
- Mereoni Yabakidrau
- Sofi Diyalowai
- Vilorina Drotini
- Jijilia Dugucanavanua
- Vanisha Kumar
- Lewamanu Moce
- Joyce Naceva
- Annette Nainima

Men

4th – Men's tournament.

Head coach: (Uruguay) Juan Carlos Buzzetti

No.	Pos.	Player	Date of birth (age)	Caps	Goals	Club
1	GK	Senirusi Bokini	February 6, 1994 (age 32)	3	0	(Fiji Football Association) Lautoka
20	GK	Tevita Koroi	April 12, 1994 (age 32)	0	0	(Fiji Football Association) Suva
2	DF	Praneel Naidu	January 29, 1995 (age 31)	0	0	(Fiji Football Association) Ba
6	DF	Viliame Bawai	March 9, 1993 (age 33)	3	0	(Fiji Football Association) Rewa
8	DF	Sakaraia Naisua	March 9, 1993 (age 33)	2	0	(Fiji Football Association) Suva
11	DF	Ravinesh Dass	November 2, 1993 (age 32)	3	0	(Fiji Football Association) Nadroga
14	DF	Antonio Tuivuna	March 20, 1995 (age 31)	0	0	(Fiji Football Association) Nadi
17	DF	Filipe Baravilala	November 25, 1994 (age 31)	3	0	(Fiji Football Association) Nadi
18	DF	Kolinio Sivoki	March 10, 1995 (age 31)	0	0	(Fiji Football Association) Suva
3	MF	Manasa Nawakula	June 3, 1994 (age 31)	3	0	(Fiji Football Association) Ba
4	MF	Jale Dreola	April 21, 1995 (age 31)	0	0	(Fiji Football Association) Suva
7	MF	Garish Prasad	February 1, 1995 (age 31)	0	0	(Fiji Football Association) Rewa
10	MF	Christopher Wasasala	December 31, 1994 (age 31)	2	2	(Fiji Football Association) Labasa
12	MF	Tevita Waranaivalu	September 16, 1995 (age 30)	0	0	(Fiji Football Association) Rewa
16	MF	Ratu Nakalevu	March 7, 1994 (age 32)	1	0	(Fiji Football Association) Rewa
19	MF	Nickel Chand	July 28, 1995 (age 30)	0	0	(Fiji Football Association) Suva
5	FW	Rusiate Matarerega	January 17, 1993 (age 33)	3	0	(Fiji Football Association) Suva
9	FW	Iosefo Verevou	January 5, 1996 (age 30)	3	0	(Fiji Football Association) Rewa
13	FW	Saula Waqa	October 12, 1995 (age 30)	3	0	(Fiji Football Association) Ba
15	FW	Napolioni Qasevakatini	March 17, 1993 (age 33)	2	0	(Fiji Football Association) Suva

== Golf ==
Female

- Sylvia Leona Harriet Joe
- Merelita Divelulu McCarthy
- Ufemia Naisara
- Selai Pridgeon

Men

- Olaf Frank Grant
- Anuresh Chandra
- Abid Hussain
- Roneel Prakash

== Karate ==
Kata Team Female

- Naomi Veilomani Bakani
- Adi Drodrolagi M Kidia
- Kalei Krystelle Lolou Seniloli

Kata Team Male

- Alexander Darroch
- James Solomon Lenoa
- Pita Isaia Lenoa
- Sandip Pala
- Tevita Tamanigaunatawamudu
- Joji Veremalua
- Anthony Patrick Pui Kei Yam

Kumite Team Female

- Naomi Veilomani Bakani
- Adi Drodrolagi M Kidia

Kumite Team Male

- Alexander Darroch
- James Solomon Lenoa
- Pita Isaia Lenoa
- Sandip Pala
- Tevita Tamanigaunatawamudu
- Joji Veremalua

== Lawn bowls ==
Men

- David Aitcheson

Women

- Radhika Prasad
- Sarote Hiagi
- Litia Tikoisuva
- Sheral Mar
- Elizabeth Moceiwai

== Rugby league nines ==
Men

4th – lost the 3rd place play-off 14-16 to Tonga.

- Waisea Bati
- Wame Belolevu
- Esira Dokoni
- Eliki Ledua
- Jiuta Lutumailagi
- Jovilisi Naqitawa
- Roko Naulivou
- Etuate Qionimacawa
- Nemani Raiwalui
- Tomasi Ravouvou
- Etika Rokobuli
- Asaeli Saravaki
- Jone Sariri
- Nereo Senimoli
- Lepani Tacikalou

Coach: Maika Vunivere

== Rugby sevens ==
Women

– Women's tournament.

- Rusila Nagasau
- Litia Naiqato
- Elina Ratauluva
- Akosita Ravato
- Timaima Ravisa
- Ana Maria Roqica
- Asinate Savu
- Rusila Tamoi
- Timaima Tamoi
- Lavenia Tinai
- Luisa Tisolo
- Talica Vodo

Men

– Men's tournament.

- Abele Yalayalatabua
- Jasa Veremalua
- Viliame Mata
- Emosi Mulevoro
- Amenoni Nasilasila
- Vatemo Ravouvou
- Kitione Taliga
- Isake Katonibau
- Manueli Laqai
- Sitiveni Waqa
- Keponi Paul
- Savenaca Rawaca

== Shooting ==
Fiji qualified ten athletes in shooting:

Men

- Adarsh Krishneel Datt
- Sunil Datt
- Glenn Kable
- Faiyum Murtaza Khan
- Nihal Nishant Naicker
- Swee Seng Phua (Michael) Phua
- Christian Gerald Pau Stephen
- Quintyn Sargun Francis Stephen
- George William Fifita Tudreu
- Daniel Wah

== Swimming ==
Women

- Adi Kinisimere Vunisea Esiteri Naivalu
- Caroline Puamau
- Cheyenne Rova
- Iris Hefrani Pene
- Matelita Buadromo
- Rosemarie Rova
- Tieri Ann Rachael Erasito
- Yolani Julia Blake

Men

- Brosnan Paul Erbsleben
- Carl Probert
- Douglas Miller
- Eugene Kado
- Gordon Thompson
- Kinver Ray Filipo Nicholls
- Meli Malani
- Oakley Johns
- Paul Elaisa
- Taichi Vakasama
- William James Clark

== Table tennis ==
Women

- Shriti Vandana Vandana Jeet
- Xuan Li
- Grace Rosi Yee
