= Federated States of Micronesia national under-23 football team =

National association football team

- Nickname: The Four Stars
- Association: Federated States of Micronesia Football Association
- Head coach: Stan Foster
- Captain: Mikson Kuka
- Top scorer: None
First colors	Second colors

First international
- Federated States of Micronesia 0–30 Tahiti (Port Moresby, Papua New Guinea; 3 July 2015)

Biggest win
- None

Biggest defeat
- Federated States of Micronesia 0–46 Vanuatu (Port Moresby, Papua New Guinea; 7 July 2015)

Pacific Games
- Appearances: 1 (first in 2015)
- Best result: Group stage (2015)

The Federated States of Micronesia national under-23 football team, nicknamed the Four Stars, is the national U-23 football team representing the Federated States of Micronesia and is controlled by the Federated States of Micronesia Football Association. The team is managed by Australian coach Stan Foster, with the assistant manager Curtis Graham.

Although the senior team had been competing on the international stage sporadically for a number of years, the nation lacked any junior teams until the under-23 team was founded in 2014. Having never played together as a full squad until a training camp in Guam, and traveling to the games with kit donated by their hosts, they made their competitive debut in international football at the 2015 Pacific Games with a view to using the tournament as both a development opportunity for young players in the country and also as the first steps towards gaining official recognition from and membership of FIFA.

Their performance was the worst recorded in international football as they lost all three games, conceding 114 goals (an average of 38 goals each game) in the process without scoring themselves. On two occasions, against Fiji and Vanuatu, they conceded a record number of goals in international competition. However, although these matches count as official records for the Pacific Games, they are not recognized by FIFA as official world records, as the games did not involve senior teams. Despite the unofficial nature of their record defeats, numerous international media outlets have branded them the worst football team on the planet.

== History ==
=== Background ===
The four states of the Federated States of Micronesia: Yap, Chuuk, Pohnpei and Kosrae are spread out over six hundred islands in an isolated area of the Pacific Ocean. Many of the islands, although touched by western influences, have had very little contact with modern media, stone money is still used symbolically on occasions and many of the team selected for the 2015 Pacific Games still live in huts in small villages, lacking hot water and modern conveniences. There are only two full-sized football pitches in the country, both of which are on Yap, the multi-use Yap Sports Complex and the dedicated football pitch at the Yap State Soccer field. In regions such as Chuuk, the lack of facilities means that all football played is street football.

=== Foundation ===
Previously the senior team had entered the 2003 South Pacific Games, performing poorly, losing all four games and conceding 52 goals without reply. This was the last recorded time that any Micronesian team had played against full international sides, although individual islands of Micronesia competed in the 2014 Micronesia Games. However, before the tournament, Kiribati withdrew, Guam chose not to send a team and the Northern Mariana Islands were unable to send a team as their regular squad was playing in the EAFF East Asian Cup, leaving non-FIFA member Palau as the only international representative and Micronesia competing as separate states.

Under the auspices of manager Stan Foster and assistant manager Curtis Graham, The Federated States of Micronesia under-23 team, nicknamed the Four Stars, began training in the second half of 2014 in unusual circumstances. Due to the scattered nature of the islands, it was impossible for the team to get together initially to train as a full squad and instead individuals had to train in small groups on their islands of origin. Although this method of selection meant the team was not able to get together as a single unit until their pre-tournament camp in Guam, it was a method that met with the approval of the football association President Jim Wuthel as being one that allowed the selection of a squad that was truly representative of the islands despite an almost complete lack of money or sponsorship.

The two-week extended pre-tournament camp in Guam, funded by the football association, allowed the team to train together for the first time, make use of the significantly better facilities offered by the Guam Football Association and gave them the chance to test themselves against a number of teams in the Guam Men's Soccer League prior to their departure for Papua New Guinea. The training camp also allowed the team to take possession of an away kit for the first time courtesy of the Guam Football Association and were it not for a meeting with a local restaurateur during their training camp, some of the players would have travelled to the games without boots.

=== 2015 Pacific Games ===
The Federated States of Micronesia national under-23 football team had never taken part in a tournament until 2015 when they entered the Pacific Games, competing in the 14th edition of the men's football tournament, which was held in Port Moresby, Papua New Guinea between 3 and 17 July 2015. The Micronesian National Olympic Committee stated that the reason they entered the competition was to try to enhance their chances of membership of FIFA, although they had tentatively begun their application process back in 2001, and the national Olympic committee, via the International Olympic Committee provided a $ 50,000 grant to cover airfares, insurance and accommodation costs while in Port Moresby to enable the team to compete.

The Oceania Football Confederation (OFC) used this tournament as the OFC Men's Olympic Qualifying Tournament for the 2016 Summer Olympic men's tournament. A separate qualifying tournament was initially set to take place at Tonga between 2–12 December 2015 however, it was later decided to absorb the qualifying tournament into the Pacific Games, leading to the New Zealand team participating for the first time in the Pacific Games men's football tournament. As a result of this, the Federated States of Micronesia Football Association sent their under-23 team to make their debut on the international stage. Despite initial claims that the team should not be underestimated and that they were not simply there to make up the numbers, their performance was to be the worst on record for international competition.

==== Micronesia 0–30 Tahiti ====
Their debut at the 2015 Pacific Games was an inauspicious start for the team, losing 0–30 to Tahiti, having arrived at the tournament with a squad of only 18 players. Michel Maihi opened the scoring in the second minute with a fluke goal which he later admitted was intended to be a cross. Maihi went on to score a further four goals in the match, but he was beaten to the title of top scorer by Fred Tissot, who scored six. Manuarii Hauata, Tevairoa Tehuritaua, Mauarii Tehina, Yohan Tihoni and Raiamanu Tauira scored three or more each to complete the scoring. This was the second time that Tahiti had recorded a 30–0 victory in the Pacific Games, matching the scoreline in a game against the Cook Islands in 1971. As Tahiti's onslaught went on, the crowd began to cheer for the Micronesians and nicknaming their number 10, Roger Nakasone, "Messi". Immediately following the match, the Tahitian team performed a post-match haka towards their opponents, inflicting on them additional embarrassment.

3 July 2015
10:00 (UTC+10)
2015 Pacific Games – Group A

Micronesia	0–30	Tahiti
	Report	Maihi 2', 34', 46', 52', 86'; Hauata 9', 48', 90+6'; Tehuritaua 12', 20', 40', 45+2'; Tehina 24', 38', 49', 54'; Petigas 34'; Tihoni 50', 51', 90+1'; Tissot 60', 64', 66', 75', 82', 85'; Taupotini 63'; Tauira 90', 90+2', 90+4'

Bisini Sports Complex, Port Moresby
Referee: Ichikawa Polovili (Tonga)

==== Micronesia 0–38 Fiji ====
Their next match produced an even more one-sided result, indeed to that point the most one-sided result in international football history, as they lost to Fiji 0–38, with goalkeeper Walter Pengelbew conceding 21 goals in the first half before being replaced in goal by erstwhile midfielder Dominic Gadad, who himself went on to concede a further 17 goals as Micronesia eclipsed the former world record for number of goals conceded in official competition set by American Samoa when they conceded 31 against Australia in 2001. However, this result did not replace the American Samoa match in the record books firstly as Micronesia are not affiliated to FIFA and secondly as the competition, since it is doubling up as a qualifying tournament for the 2016 Summer Olympics, is being contested by under-23 teams. However, the scoreline was deemed an official record for the Pacific Games. Tony Tuivuna scored ten goals for Fiji, narrowly beating Chris Wasasala, who scored nine goals on his international debut to top scorer. Also scoring were Iosefo Verevou and Garish Prasad with five each, Napolioni Qasevakatini with four, Masana Nawakula with two, while Savenaca Nakalevu and Tevita Waranaivalu scored one each.

The result of the match was not a surprise to the manager of the team, Stan Foster, who stated that the team were at the tournament for development purposes, to try as hard as they could and to take any information they could glean from their experiences home with them to aid their progression. Fiji manager, Juan Carlos Buzzetti was apologetic after the match, acknowledging the inexperience and youth of the opposition, and saying that they had little option but to finish with such a scoreline after Tahiti had set the benchmark in the previous match, but was also critical of his own players for not always sticking to their game plan to play one-touch football.

The reasons for the size of the defeat have been put down to the general lack of experience within the diminished squad as a whole, with most of the players only getting involved in the game at most eighteen months prior to the tournament starting. Indeed, most of the players came from villages where they did not play the game at all and Gadad, who replaced Pengelbew in goal at half time, had only played as a goalkeeper for the first time three weeks prior.

5 July 2015
10:00 (UTC+10)
2015 Pacific Games – Group A

Micronesia (Federated States of Micronesia)	0–38	Fiji
	report	Wasasala 1', 6', 27', 29', 30', 36', 53', 56', 66'; Tuivuna 4', 9', 28', 43', 45+1', 45+4', 70', 85', 90+3', 90+6'; Verevou 8', 26', 40', 45+2', 45+3'; Qasevakatini 10', 12', 24', 59', 67'; Prasad 22', 63', 65', 76'; Waranaivalu 47'; Nawakula 79', 80', 88'; Nakalevu 90+6'

Bisini Sport Complex, Port Moresby
Attendance: 500
Referee: Hillary Ani (Papua New Guinea)

==== Vanuatu 46–0 Micronesia ====
Having suffered one record defeat to Fiji, the fledgling Micronesia team lost even more heavily in their final group game, defeated 46–0 by Vanuatu, with Jean Kaltack scoring a record 16 goals. With Micronesia having lost so heavily in their opening games, Vanuatu were faced with the seemingly difficult task of having to score a minimum of thirty goals in order to stand a chance of progressing to the next round of competition. However, the team, ranked 200th in the world at the time, found themselves 24–0 ahead at half time having scored three more goals by that stage than Fiji had managed in their game.

Tony Kaltack opened the scoring in the second minute, but by the end of the game, Tafea striker Jean Kaltack was the top scorer in the match with 16 goals. Tony Kaltack increased his tally by a further five goals in the match, Bill Nicholls and Barry Mansale scored ten and six goals respectively while Dalong Damalip's hat-trick, Abraham Roqara's two and one each for Brian Kaltack, Nemani Nikiau, Zicka Manuhi and Chris Andrews rounded out the scoring.

7 July 2015
11:00 (UTC+10)
2015 Pacific Games – Group A

Vanuatu	46–0	Micronesia
T. Kaltack 2', 18', 27', 49', 53', 56'; Nicholls 3', 16', 37', 45+3', 50'; 57', 61', 64', 65', 72'; J. Kaltack 4', 6', 17', 34', 37'; 44', 45', 45+2', 47', 54'; 59', 60', 66', 73', 90+3', 90+4'; Mansale 12', 20', 22', 29', 30', 36'; Damalip 14', 45+1'; B. Kaltack 23'; Nikiau 55'; Roqara 68', 89'; Manuhi 74'; Andrews 90'	Report

Bisini Sports Complex, Port Moresby
Referee: Ichikawa Polovili (Tonga)

==== Final standings ====
The team finished the tournament with three heavy losses and no wins, scoring no goals whilst conceding 114 in total. They finished last in the group and did not progress to either knockout round (although they could not have progressed to the Olympic games qualifying rounds as they are not members of FIFA).

Pos	Team	Pld	W	D	L	GF	GA	GD	Pts	Qualification
1	Tahiti	3	2	1	0	32	1	+31	7	Pacific Games knockout stage
2	Fiji	3	1	2	0	39	1	+38	5	Olympic Qualifying and Pacific Games knockout stage
3	Vanuatu	3	1	1	1	48	3	+45	4	Olympic Qualifying knockout stage
4	Micronesia	3	0	0	3	0	114	−114	0	

==== Aftermath ====
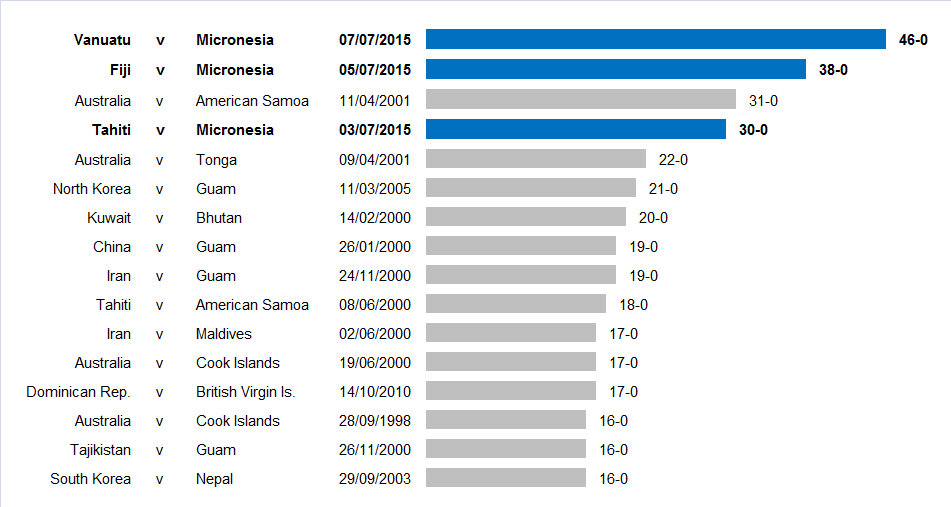
A bar chart illustrating the largest margins of victory in international football since 1997.

Following the game against Vanuatu, Foster expressed relief that the team would be allowed back at the next Pacific Games, fearing they would be refused entry due to the quality of their results, but they received assurances from the organizers that they were aware that the side that competed was a development side and that he hoped, despite receiving criticism before the start of the tournament for selecting a team of such young players, that a number of the players would be able to use the Pacific Games to enhance their development for the next eight years. Though he noted that it would be difficult for the nation to improve the standard of their football until they were recognized by FIFA, he said that he anticipated a FIFA delegation would be visiting the islands in the following week to carry out an inspection and with a view to affiliating them with the AFC. This would then entitle them to funding and technical assistance that would enable the nation to improve the standard of football. National media reported that membership would allow the nation to build new stadium and renovate existing facilities, bring professional coaches to the islands and purchase much-needed equipment.

To put into context the series of defeats his team had suffered, Foster said that for many of his players this was the first time that they had played a game on a full-size 11-a-side pitch. He also said that in general the players were simply overawed with the occasion, noting that many of them had never even left their villages, let alone their respective islands and that during the pre-tournament training camp in Guam a number of the players gained their first experience of an escalator or elevator. Following these defeats, several members of the squad said to the manager that they wanted to train as goalkeepers. Despite conceding a record number of goals, and with media outlets labelling them the worst team in the world, many of the outfield players were heartened by the cheers their goalkeeper received every time he made a save. The major stumbling block facing Micronesia is, if they do not gain FIFA affiliation, then their next scheduled international match will not be for another four years, when they will travel to Samoa for the 2019 Pacific Games. Micronesia subsequently did not receive FIFA affiliation, nor did a football team from the nation contest the 2019 Pacific Games.

Despite the heavy defeats suffered by the team, national media was upbeat about the overall performances, remarking that despite the results, none of the athletes ever gave up, that they won the respect of the opposition in all three games they played and that the team as a whole could be very proud of their efforts. It was noted that if, as a result of competing the nation could join FIFA that the benefits of membership would outweigh the losses in the tournament. International media however was less complimentary, with numerous outlets focussing solely on the results and labelling the side the worst football team on earth. Despite this, the players received a warm reception upon their return home. On Yap people were pleased simply because the players had had the chance to travel abroad and experience international competition, with such opportunities normally being limited to Guam if at all. Indeed, as a result of their experiences, one player was looking to join a football club in Guam, with several others considering similar options.

=== FIFA affiliation ===
The Oceania Football Confederation had dissuaded Micronesia from applying to their association, saying that they would have better developmental opportunities within the AFC, although with FIFA having more Pacific members than the United Nations, affiliation with FIFA is also not assured; they have cancelled previous visits and rejected membership of other nations in the past due to the level of hotel facilities on offer. A FIFA delegate visited the islands following the tournament to review the condition of facilities in the country and the level of football development, with a decision on potential FIFA affiliation due before the end of 2015. Foster remarked that the initial report provided by the delegate was positive.

== Stadium ==
The team has yet to play any home fixtures. There are only two full-sized football pitches in the country, both of which are on Yap, the multi-use Yap Sports Complex and the dedicated football pitch at the Yap State Soccer field.

== Squad ==
The following players were called up to the squad for the 2015 Pacific Games from 3–17 July 2015.

2015 Pacific Games Squad
Number	Position	Name	Age	Club
1	GK	Walter Pengelbew	17	Nimgil Youth Organization (Yap)
2		Kacy Alton Olmos	20	
3	MF	Mikson Kuka (captain)	23	
4		Jacob Nam	22	Weloy Strikers (Weloy, Yap)
5		Ioane Kariti	21	College of Micronesia-FSM FC (Palikir, Pohnpei)
7		Javin Kognang	20	Nimgil Youth Organization (Yap)
8		Franson Simon	21	College of Micronesia-FSM FC (Palikir, Pohnpei)
9		Mark Jones	19	College of Micronesia-FSM FC (Palikir, Pohnpei)
10	MF	Roger Nakasone	22	Pitbulls
11		Aaran Bayow	16	Nimgil Youth Organization (Yap)
12		Scott Rudolph	22	
13		MacArthur James	23	Island Pitbulls (Pohnpei)
14		Paulis Jeikek	21	
15		Jonathan Garayog	21	Nimgil Youth Organization (Yap)
16		Devon Figirmow	29	G&B Club Rull (Rull, Yap)
17		Benjamin Gilmoon	18	Nimgil Youth Organization (Yap)
18	MF	Dominic Gadad	20	Nimgil Youth Organization (Yap)
20		Michael Reyes	26	College of Micronesia-FSM FC (Palikir, Pohnpei)

Note: Squad ages as at time of Pacific Games 2015. Source:

== Managers ==
- (Australia) Stan Foster 2014–
