= Football at the 2015 Pacific Games – Men's tournament =

2015 Pacific Games men's football tournament
Tournament details
- Host country: Papua New Guinea
- City: Port Moresby
- Dates: 3–17 July 2015
- Teams: 8 (from 1 confederation)
- Venues: 2 (in 1 host city)

Final positions
- Champions: New Caledonia (7th title)
- Runners-up: Tahiti
- Third place: Papua New Guinea
- Fourth place: Fiji

Tournament statistics
- Matches played: 16
- Goals scored: 142 (8.88 per match)
- Top scorer: (Vanuatu) Jean Kaltack (17 goals)

2015 OFC Men's Olympic Qualifying Tournament
Final positions
- Champions: Fiji (1st title)
- Runners-up: Vanuatu
- Third place: Papua New Guinea
- Fourth place: New Zealand

Tournament statistics
- Matches played: 15
- Goals scored: 138 (9.2 per match)
- Top scorer: (Vanuatu) Jean Kaltack (17 goals)

The 2015 Pacific Games men's football tournament was the 14th edition of the Pacific Games men's football tournament. The men's football tournament was held in Port Moresby, Papua New Guinea between 3–17 July 2015 as part of the 2015 Pacific Games. The tournament was age-restricted and open to men's under-23 national teams only.

The tournament also doubled as the 7th edition of the OFC Men's Olympic Qualifying Tournament, the quadrennial international tournament organised by the Oceania Football Confederation (OFC) to determine which men's under-23 national teams from Oceania qualify for the Olympic football tournament. A separate qualifying tournament was initially set to take place at Tonga between 2–12 December 2015. However, it was later decided to absorb the qualifying tournament into the Pacific Games, as the New Zealand team participated for the first time in the Pacific Games men's football tournament.

As some of the participating teams are not members of the International Olympic Committee (IOC) and thus ineligible for the Olympics, there were two separate knockout stages, one for Olympic qualifying where the winner qualified for the 2016 Summer Olympics men's football tournament, and another for determining the Pacific Games medalists.

New Caledonia won the Pacific Games gold medal, while Fiji qualified for the Olympic football tournament for the first time after winning the OFC Olympic qualifying tournament.

== Teams ==
A total of eight teams participated in the tournament.

Team	Appearance	Previous best performance
Fiji	12th	Gold medal (1991, 2003)
FS Micronesia	2nd	Group stage (2003)
New Caledonia	14th	Gold medal (1963, 1969, 1971, 1987, 2007, 2011)
New Zealand	1st	Debut
Papua New Guinea (hosts)	13th	Bronze medal (1969, 1987)
Solomon Islands	12th	Silver medal (1991, 1995, 2011)
Tahiti	14th	Gold medal (1966, 1975, 1979, 1983, 1995)
Vanuatu	14th	Silver medal (1971)

=== Eligibility status ===
The teams are eligible for one or both knockout stages depending on their affiliation.

Team	Affiliated to				Eligible for	
Team	OFC	FIFA	IOC	Pacific Games Council	Olympic Qualifying knockout stage	Pacific Games knockout stage
Fiji	Yes	Yes	Yes	Yes	Yes	Yes
FS Micronesia	No	No	Yes	Yes	No	Yes
New Caledonia	Yes	Yes	No	Yes	No	Yes
New Zealand	Yes	Yes	Yes	No	Yes	No
Papua New Guinea	Yes	Yes	Yes	Yes	Yes	Yes
Solomon Islands	Yes	Yes	Yes	Yes	Yes	Yes
Tahiti	Yes	Yes	No	Yes	No	Yes
Vanuatu	Yes	Yes	Yes	Yes	Yes	Yes

== Venues ==
Port Moresby
Bisini Parade Sports Complex	Sir Hubert Murray Stadium
9.471732°S 147.200810°E	9.466323°S 147.156674°E

== Group stage ==
The draw was held on 1 June 2015 at the OFC Headquarters at Auckland. The eight teams were drawn into two groups of four.

For the OFC Men's Olympic Qualifying Tournament, only the five teams (Fiji, New Zealand, Papua New Guinea, Solomon Islands and Vanuatu) which are FIFA and IOC members were eligible. The top two IOC member teams of each group advanced to the Olympic Qualifying semi-finals.

For the Pacific Games Men's Football Tournament, the top two teams of each group advanced to the Pacific Games semi-finals with the exception of New Zealand, who were not eligible as they are not a Pacific Games Council member.

All times UTC+10.

=== Group A ===
Pos	Team	Pld	W	D	L	GF	GA	GD	Pts	Qualification
1	Tahiti	3	2	1	0	32	1	+31	7	Pacific Games knockout stage
2	Fiji	3	1	2	0	39	1	+38	5	Olympic Qualifying and Pacific Games knockout stage
3	Vanuatu	3	1	1	1	48	3	+45	4	Olympic Qualifying knockout stage
4	Federated States of Micronesia	3	0	0	3	0	114	−114	0	

Source: OFC
3 July 2015
10:00

Federated States of Micronesia	0–30	Tahiti
	Report	Maihi 2', 34', 46', 52', 86'; Hauata 9', 48', 90+6'; Tehuritaua 12', 20', 40', 45+2'; Tehina 24', 38', 49', 54'; Petigas 34'; Tihoni 50', 51', 90+1'; Tissot 60', 64', 66', 75', 82', 85'; Taupotini 63'; Tauira 90', 90+2', 90+4'

Bisini Sports Complex, Port Moresby
Referee: Ichikawa Polovili (Tonga)
3 July 2015
14:00

Fiji	1–1	Vanuatu
Chand 63'	Report	J. Kaltack 20'

Bisini Sports Complex, Port Moresby
Referee: Gerald Oiaka (Solomon Islands)

5 July 2015
10:00

Federated States of Micronesia	0–38	Fiji
	Report	Wasasala 2', 6', 27', 29', 30', 36', 52', 56', 65'; Tuivuna 4', 9', 28', 43', 45', 45+4', 70', 85', 90+3', 90+6'; Verevou 8', 26', 40', 45+2', 45+3'; Qasevakatini 10', 12', 24', 59', 67'; Prasad 21', 63', 64', 75', 80'; Waranaivalu 47'; Nawakula 79', 88'; Nakalevu 90+5'

Bisini Sports Complex, Port Moresby
Referee: Hillary Ani (Papua New Guinea)
5 July 2015
14:00

Tahiti	2–1	Vanuatu
Tissot 70'; Hauata 80'	Report	B. Kaltack 54' (pen.)

Bisini Sports Complex, Port Moresby
Referee: George Time (Solomon Islands)

7 July 2015
11:00

Vanuatu	46–0	Federated States of Micronesia
T. Kaltack 2', 18', 27', 49', 53', 56'; Nicholls 3', 16', 37', 45+3', 50', 57', 61', 64', 65', 72'; J. Kaltack 4', 6', 17', 34', 37', 44', 45', 45+2', 47', 54', 59', 60', 66', 73', 90+3', 90+4'; Mansale 12', 20', 22', 29', 30', 36'; Damalip 14', 45+1'; B. Kaltack 23'; Nikiau 55'; Roqara 68', 89'; Manuhi 74'; Andrews 90'	Report

Bisini Sports Complex, Port Moresby
Referee: Ichikawa Polovili (Tonga)
7 July 2015
14:00

Tahiti	0–0	Fiji
	Report

Bisini Sports Complex, Port Moresby
Referee: Gerald Oiaka (Solomon Islands)

=== Group B ===
Pos	Team	Pld	W	D	L	GF	GA	GD	Pts	Qualification
1	New Zealand	3	3	0	0	8	0	+8	9	Olympic Qualifying knockout stage
2	New Caledonia	3	2	0	1	2	5	−3	6	Pacific Games knockout stage
3	Papua New Guinea (H)	3	1	0	2	2	3	−1	3	Olympic Qualifying and Pacific Games knockout stage
4	Solomon Islands	3	0	0	3	1	5	−4	0	

Source: OFC
(H) Hosts
3 July 2015
12:00

New Zealand	2–0	Solomon Islands
Patterson 29'; Rufer 40'	Report

Bisini Sports Complex, Port Moresby
Referee: Ravitesh Behari (Fiji)
3 July 2015
15:00

Papua New Guinea	0–1	New Caledonia
	Report	Kauma 57'

Bisini Sports Complex, Port Moresby
Referee: Robinson Banga (Vanuatu)

5 July 2015
12:00

New Caledonia	1–0	Solomon Islands
Peter 85' (o.g.)	Report

Bisini Sports Complex, Port Moresby
Referee: Kader Zitouni (Tahiti)
5 July 2015
15:00

Papua New Guinea	0–1	New Zealand
	Report	Patterson 60'

Bisini Sports Complex, Port Moresby
Referee: Norbert Hauata (Tahiti)

7 July 2015
11:00

Solomon Islands	1–2	Papua New Guinea
Tome 87'	Report	Semmy 18'; Sabua 65'

Bisini Sports Complex, Port Moresby
Referee: Ravitesh Behari (Fiji)
7 July 2015
14:00

New Caledonia	0–5	New Zealand
	Report	Hudson-Wihongi 13'; Rogerson 29', 61', 68'; Prelevic 47'

Bisini Sports Complex, Port Moresby
Referee: Kader Zitouni (Tahiti)

== Olympic Qualifying knockout stage ==
Only the five teams (Fiji, New Zealand, Papua New Guinea, Solomon Islands and Vanuatu) which are both FIFA and IOC members were eligible for this stage.

Semi-finals
10 July – Port Moresby
**Fiji**	**3**
Papua New Guinea	1
10 July – Port Moresby
New Zealand	0
**Vanuatu (awd.)**	**3**

Final
12 July – Port Moresby
**Fiji (pen.)**	**0 (4)**
Vanuatu	0 (3)

=== Olympic Qualifying semi-finals ===
10 July 2015
11:00

Fiji	3–1	Papua New Guinea
Qasevakatini 3', 45+1', 53'	Report	Semmy 10' (pen.)

Bisini Sports Complex, Port Moresby
Referee: Norbert Hauata (Tahiti)
10 July 2015
14:30

New Zealand	0–3 Awarded	Vanuatu
Patterson 47'; Tuiloma 56'	Report

Bisini Sports Complex, Port Moresby
Referee: Ravitesh Behari (Fiji)

New Zealand advanced to the Olympic Qualifying final with a 2–0 result, but were replaced to Vanuatu on the day of the final after the Oceania Football Confederation found that they had fielded an ineligible player, Deklan Wynne. The match was declared a 3–0 victory for Vanuatu. New Zealand were unable to appeal before the final was played and subsequently announced they would appeal, but on 23 October 2015, the OFC announced that New Zealand's appeal had been rejected, meaning New Zealand's only chance to overturn the decision would be to appeal to the Court of Arbitration for Sport. On 13 November 2015, New Zealand Football confirmed that they would not appeal.

=== Olympic Qualifying final ===
12 July 2015
18:00

Fiji	0–0 (a.e.t.)	Vanuatu
	Report
Penalties
Tuivuna (penalty scored); Qasevakatini (penalty missed); Prasad (penalty missed); Sivoki (penalty scored); Verevo (penalty scored); Dreola (penalty scored)	4–3	(penalty scored) B. Kaltack; (penalty missed) Vava; (penalty missed) Kalo; (penalty scored) T. Kaltack; (penalty scored) J. Kaltack; (penalty missed) Kalsarap

Sir Hubert Murray Stadium, Port Moresby
Referee: Norbert Hauata (Tahiti)

Fiji qualified for 2016 Summer Olympics. This was the first time a team from OFC other than Australia or New Zealand qualified for the Olympics.

Team	Qualified on	Previous appearances in tournament^{1}
Fiji	12 July 2015	0 (debut)

^{1} Bold indicates champion for that year. Italic indicates host for that year. Statistics include all Olympic format (current Olympic under-23 format started in 1992).

== Pacific Games knockout stage ==
New Zealand were not eligible as they are not a Pacific Games Council member.

Semi-finals
15 July – Port Moresby
Tahiti	2
Papua New Guinea	1
15 July – Port Moresby
New Caledonia	2
Fiji	1

Gold medal match
17 July – Port Moresby
Tahiti	0
New Caledonia	2
Bronze medal match
17 July – Port Moresby
Papua New Guinea	2
Fiji	1

=== Pacific Games semi-finals ===
15 July 2015
11:00

Tahiti	2–1	Papua New Guinea
Tissot 55'; Lucas 76'	Report	Semmy 83'

Bisini Sports Complex, Port Moresby
Referee: Ravitesh Behari (Fiji)
15 July 2015
14:30

New Caledonia	2–1	Fiji
Ouka 5'; Decoire 42'	Report	Qasevakatini 34'

Bisini Sports Complex, Port Moresby
Referee: Kader Zitouni (Tahiti)

=== Bronze medal match ===
17 July 2015
15:00

Papua New Guinea	2–1	Fiji
Aisa 8'; A. Komolong 90+1'	Report	Tuivuna 50'

Sir Hubert Murray Stadium, Port Moresby
Referee: Gerald Oiaka (Solomon Islands)

=== Gold medal match ===
17 July 2015
19:00

Tahiti	0–2	New Caledonia
	Report	Ouka 30'; Oiremoin 74' (pen.)

Sir Hubert Murray Stadium, Port Moresby
Referee: Ravitesh Behari (Fiji)

== Goalscorers ==
17 goals

- (Vanuatu) Jean Kaltack

11 goals

- (Fiji) Antonio Tuivuna

10 goals

- (Vanuatu) Bill Nicholls

9 goals

- (Fiji) Napolioni Qasevakatini
- (Fiji) Christopher Wasasala

8 goals

- (French Polynesia) Fred Tissot

6 goals

- (Vanuatu) Tony Kaltack
- (Vanuatu) Barry Mansale

5 goals

- (Fiji) Garish Prasad
- (Fiji) Iosefo Verevou
- (French Polynesia) Michel Maihi

4 goals

- (French Polynesia) Manuarii Hauata
- (French Polynesia) Mauarii Tehina
- (French Polynesia) Tevairoa Tehuritaua

3 goals

- (New Zealand) Monty Patterson
- (New Zealand) Logan Rogerson
- (Papua New Guinea) Tommy Semmy
- (French Polynesia) Raiamanu Tauira
- (French Polynesia) Yohann Tihoni

2 goals

- (Fiji) Manasa Nawakula
- (New Caledonia) Jim Ouka
- (Vanuatu) Dalong Damalip
- (Vanuatu) Brian Kaltack
- (Vanuatu) Abraham Roqara

1 goal

- (Fiji) Nickel Chand
- (Fiji) Savenaca Nakalevu
- (Fiji) Tevita Waranaivalu
- (New Caledonia) Cedric Decoire
- (New Caledonia) Pierre Kauma
- (New Caledonia) Raphael Oiremoin
- (New Zealand) Te Atawhai Hudson-Wihongi
- (New Zealand) Luka Prelevic
- (New Zealand) Alex Rufer
- (New Zealand) Bill Tuiloma
- (Papua New Guinea) Patrick Aisa
- (Papua New Guinea) Alwin Komolong
- (Papua New Guinea) Jacob Sabua
- (Solomon Islands) Davidson Tome
- (French Polynesia) Tauatua Lucas
- (French Polynesia) Louis Petigas
- (French Polynesia) Tehei Taupotini
- (Vanuatu) Chris Andrews
- (Vanuatu) Zicka Manuhi
- (Vanuatu) Nemani Nickiau

Own goal

- (Solomon Islands) Allen Peter (playing against New Caledonia)

== See also ==
- Football at the 2015 Pacific Games – Women's tournament
