= Tahiti Coupe des Champions =

- Founded: 1995
- Country: Tahiti
- Confederation: OFC
- Number of clubs: 2
- Current champions: AS Pirae (3rd title); 2022
- Most championships: AS Tefana and AS Pirae (3 titles each)
- Website: www.ftf.pf

The Coupe des Champions (Tahiti Super Cup) is a match between the winner of the Tahiti Ligue 1 and the winner of the Tahiti Cup.

== List of Winners ==
| Year | Winner | Score | Runner-up | Goals |
|---|---|---|---|---|
| 1995 | Vénus | Win | Central Sport | |
| 1996 | Pirae | Win | Manu-Ura | |
| 1997 | Dragon | 2–0 | Vénus | |
| 1998 | Unknown | | | |
| 1999 | Vénus | Win | ? | |
| 2000–2006 | Unknown | | | |
| 2007 | Tefana | 3–1 | Manu-Ura | Moreta^{1}, Degage^{1}, Tchen^{1} (Tefana). Teuihara^{1} (Manu-Ura). |
| 2008 | Manu-Ura | 0–0 (5–4 pen.) | Tefana | |
| 2009–2013 | Unknown | | | |
| 2014 | Tefana | 3–2 | Pirae | |
| 2015 | Unknown | | | |
| 2016 | Dragon | 2–1 | Tefana | |
| 2017 | Tefana | 4–2 | Dragon | |
| 2018 | Central Sport | 5–4 | Dragon | Hauata^{1}, Graglia^{1}, Tissot^{2}, L. Tehau^{1} (Central). R. Tehau^{3}, Teinaore^{1}. |
| 2019 | Unknown | | | |
| 2020 | Not played | | | |
| 2021 | Pirae | 5–3 | Vénus | Bourebare^{1}, Gitton^{2}, Mathon^{2} (Pirae). T. Tehau^{2}, Bremond^{1} (Vénus). |
| 2022 | Pirae | 6-0 | Vénus | Tetauira^{3}, Labaste^{1}, Mathon^{2} (Pirae). |

== Performances ==
=== Performances by club ===
| Club | Winners | Runners-up |
|---|---|---|
| Tefana | 3 | 2 |
| Pirae | 3 | 1 |
| Dragon | 2 | 2 |
| Vénus | 2 | 3 |
| Manu-Ura | 1 | 2 |
| Central Sport | 1 | 1 |

== Top scorers ==
| Rank | Player | Goals | Teams |
|---|---|---|---|
| 1 | (French Polynesia) Benoit Mathon | 4 | Pirae |
| 2 | (French Polynesia) Roonui Tehau | 3 | Dragon |
| 2 | (French Polynesia) Teaonui Tehau | 3 | Vénus |
| 2 | (French Polynesia) Tamatoa Tetauira | 3 | Pirae |
| 5 | (French Polynesia) Teihuto Gitton | 2 | Pirae |
| 5 | (French Polynesia) Fred Tissot | 2 | Central Sport |
| 7 | Several players | 1 | Several teams |

== Hat-tricks ==
| Player | For | Against | Score | Date |
|---|---|---|---|---|
| (French Polynesia) Roonui Tehau | Dragon | Central Sport | 5-4 | 22 September 2018 |
| (French Polynesia) Tamatoa Tetauira | Pirae | Vénus | 0-6 | 8 October 2022 |
