= Stan Foster (soccer manager) =

Australian soccer manager

Personal information
- Full name: Stanley Foster
- Date of birth: 1950 or 1951 (age 75–76)
- Place of birth: New South Wales, Australia

Managerial career
- Years: Team
- 2014–2015: Micronesia
- 2015: Micronesia U23

Stanley Foster (born 1950 or 1951) is an Australian soccer manager, who was notably the manager of the Federated States of Micronesia under-23 national team at the 2015 Pacific Games, where they conceded 114 goals across three matches.

== Soccer career ==
By 2013, he had been playing or coaching soccer for over 50 years.

=== Micronesia ===
In March 2013, Foster arrived in Micronesia as part of Australian Volunteers International, to both help develop soccer in the country, and assist the Federated States of Micronesia Football Association with preparation for the arrival of an Asian Football Confederation delegation to evaluate their application to FIFA. While there, he also helped open various soccer academies in the country.

In 2014, he was appointed the manager of the Federated States of Micronesia national team, as well as their under-23 national team. At the time of his appointment, he was the only FIFA-certified manager in the country. With the under-23 national team, he competed at the 2015 Pacific Games in Papua New Guinea, where they notably conceded 114 goals across three matches, including a 30–0 defeat to Tahiti (which he missed due to visa issues), a 38–0 defeat to Fiji, and a 46–0 defeat to Vanuatu. After the tournament, Foster admitted the team were only "a little bit devastated" with the results.

== Personal life ==
By trade, Foster works as an engineer and surveyor.
