= Rodney Mobiha =

Papua New Guinean footballer (born 1994)

Personal information
- Date of birth: 1 February 1994 (age 32)
- Place of birth: Papua New Guinea
- Position: Midfielder

Team information
- Current team: Birkenhead United

Youth career
- Besta United PNG

Senior career*
Years	Team	Apps	(Gls)
2011–2013	Besta United PNG		
2013–2016	Admiralty Palaiau		
2016–	Birkenhead United		

International career^{‡}
2011	Papua New Guinea U17	3	(0)
2013	Papua New Guinea U23	3	(0)
2016–	Papua New Guinea	1	(0)
Medal record
Men's football
Representing Papua New Guinea
Pacific Games
Bronze medal – third place	2015 Papua New Guinea
- * Club domestic league appearances and goals as of 30 October 2016 ‡ National team caps and goals as of 30 October 2016

Rodney Mobiha (born 1 February 1994) is a Papua New Guinean footballer who plays as a midfielder for Birkenhead United and the Papua New Guinea national football team. He made his debut for the national team on 12 October 2014 in a 5–0 loss against the Philippines.

== Club career ==
Mobiha started his career with the development team of the Papua New Guinea Football Association called: Besta United PNG. In 2013, he moved to Admiralty Palaiau where he made it to become a member of the national team. In 2016, he moved to New Zealand side Birkenhead United.

== International career ==
Mobiha played for PNG U17 during the 2011 OFC U-17 Championship and PNG U23 during the 2015 Pacific Games on home soil where they made it to a bronze medal. He didn't play for the U20's during the 2013 OFC U-20 Championship because of an injury. He made his debut for the national team on 12 October 2014. After this match it took more than two years to be called up again, on 30 October 2016 for a friendly match against Malaysia.

== Honours ==
Papua New Guinea U-23

- Pacific Games: Bronze Medalist, 2015
