= Lami F.C. =

Fijian football club

- Full name: Lami Football Club
- Founded: 1978
- Chairman: TBA
- Manager: TBA
- League: Fiji Senior League (Second Tier)
- 2025: TBA
Home colours

Lami F.C. is a Fijian football team playing in the second division of the Fiji Football Association competitions. It is based in Lami, which is a town situated some 10 kilometers from Suva on the island of Viti Levu.

Their uniform includes gold shirt.

== History ==
The Lami Soccer Association was formed in 1978, under the presidency of Johnny Singh.

== Current squad ==
Squad for the 2018 Inter-District Championship

Note: Flags indicate national team as defined under FIFA eligibility rules; some limited exceptions apply. Players may hold more than one non-FIFA nationality.

| No. | Pos. | Nation | Player |
|---|---|---|---|
| 1 | GK | FIJ | WAISAKE RAVUIWASA |
| 2 | | FIJ | SHELVEEN PRASAD |
| 3 | | FIJ | MATHEW CHARITAR |
| 4 | FW | FIJ | TANIELA RAKARIVA |
| 5 | DF | FIJ | VINAL PRASAD |
| 6 | | FIJ | BRIAN CHARITAR |
| 7 | FW | FIJ | RAVIKESH KRISHNA |
| 8 | | FIJ | ASIS CHAND |
| 9 | | FIJ | RAVNIT SHELVIN CHAND |
| 10 | FW | FIJ | FRANCE CATAROGO |
| 11 | | FIJ | KALISITO BONAWAI |

| No. | Pos. | Nation | Player |
|---|---|---|---|
| 12 | | FIJ | SHAHIL KUMAR |
| 13 | | FIJ | RATU VINAU SAUMAKI |
| 14 | | FIJ | JONE TAGIME |
| 15 | FW | FIJ | SHAMAL SABNEEL LAL |
| 16 | MF | FIJ | MOHD SHAHAIL YASEEN |
| 17 | FW | FIJ | ASAKE KEDRIKA |
| 18 | | FIJ | KARTIK RAVI KUMAR |
| 19 | DF | FIJ | MENON RAM |
| 20 | FW | FIJ | APISAI SESEWA |
| 21 | MF | FIJ | Nickel Chand |
| 22 | GK | FIJ | RUSIATE NABOUTA |

== See also ==
- Fiji Football Association

== Bibliography ==
- M. Prasad, Sixty Years of Soccer in Fiji 1938 – 1998: The Official History of the Fiji Football Association, Fiji Football Association, Suva, 1998.
