= Tevita Koroi =

Fijian footballer

Personal information
- Full name: Tevita Kalisito Cakau Koroi
- Date of birth: 12 April 1994 (age 32)
- Place of birth: Fiji
- Position: Goalkeeper

Team information
- Current team: Tailevu Naitasiri
- Number: 1

Senior career*
Years	Team	Apps	(Gls)
2013–2014	Ba		
2014–2015	Navua	1+	(0)
2015–2018	Suva		(0)
2018–	Tailevu Naitasiri		

International career
2013	Fiji U20	3	(0)
2015–2016	Fiji U23	6	(0)
2015–	Fiji	4	(0)
Medal record
Men's football
Representing Fiji
OFC U-20 Championship
Runner-up	2013 Fiji
Pacific Mini Games
Silver medal – second place	2017 Vanuatu
- * Club domestic league appearances and goals

Tevita Koroi (born 12 April 1994) is a Fijian footballer who plays as a goalkeeper for Fijian club Tailevu Naitasiri and the Fiji national team. He is a Fiji international.

== Career ==
Koroi started his career with Ba, however he didn't manage to break into the first team. In 2014 he moved to Navua to get more playing time. He made his debut for the club against Labasa and was immediately the first choice goalkeeper after Suva implemented the decision. After a good season with the club he moved to Fiji football giants Suva.

In 2021, he signed for Ba.

== International career ==
Koroi made his international debut for the U20's in 2013. During the 2013 OFC U-20 Championship he played three games. These games were all victorious. However against New Zealand, the game that Koroi didn't play, Fiji lost by four goals to nil.

In 2015 he was part of the Fiji national under-23 football team that managed to win the 2015 Pacific Games. Koroi played in all six games, including the final against Vanuatu that Fiji managed to win after a penalty shootout. In the preparation for the 2016 Summer Olympics Koroi was part of the side that did a tour in Spain and Brazil, however he was not part of the final squad for the Summer Olympics. This was because Fiji chose to pick the experience national team goalkeeper Simione Tamanisau. Frankly, after this tournament he became the first team goalkeeper for Suva.

== Honours ==
Fiji

- Pacific Mini Games: Silver Medalist, 2017

Fiji U20

- OFC U-20 Championship: Runner-up, 2013
