= Gimale Essacu =

Papua New Guinean association football player

Gimale Essacu (born 4 July 1997) is a Papua New Guinean footballer who last played as a midfielder for Western Illinois Leathernecks.

== Career ==
Essacu started his career with Australian side Canberra City. In 2017, he joined Otero Rattlers in the United States. In 2018, Essacu signed for Australian club West Canberra Wanderers. After that, he joined Western Illinois Leathernecks in the United States.
