= Thomas Schmidt (footballer) =

New Caledonian footballer (born 1996)

Thomas Schimdt
Personal information
- Full name: Thomas Schimdt
- Date of birth: 4 June 1996 (age 30)
- Place of birth: New Caledonia
- Position: Goalkeeper

Team information
- Current team: Lössi
- Number: 29

Senior career*
Years	Team	Apps	(Gls)
2013–2016	Mont-Dore		
2016–2018	Lössi		
2018–2025	Mont-Dore		
2025–	Tiga Sport		

International career^{‡}
2013	New Caledonia U17	4	(0)
2014	New Caledonia U20	2	(0)
2015–	New Caledonia U23	8	(0)
2016–	New Caledonia	6	(0)
Medal record
Men's football
Representing New Caledonia
Pacific Games
Gold medal – first place	2015 Papua New Guinea
- * Club domestic league appearances and goals as of 26 March 2016 ‡ National team caps and goals as of 15 November 2016

Thomas Schmidt (born 4 June 1996) is a New Caledonian footballer who plays as a goalkeeper for Super Ligue side Tiga Sport and the New Caledonia national team.

== Honours ==
New Caledonia U-23

- Pacific Games: Gold Medalist, 2015
