= Manuarii Hauata =

Tahitian footballer (born 1994)

Personal information
- Date of birth: March 17, 1994 (age 32)
- Place of birth: Tahiti
- Position: Midfielder

Team information
- Current team: A.S. Central Sport

International career
Years	Team	Apps	(Gls)
2011	Tahiti U-17	5	(0)
- Tahiti U-23
2015	Tahiti	1	(0)
Medal record
Men's football
Representing Tahiti
Pacific Games
Silver medal – second place	2015 Papua New Guinea

Manuarii Hauata (born March 17, 1994) is a footballer playing for A.S. Central Sport and the Tahiti national football team.

== Key International Matches ==
2015 Pacific Games quarter-final vs Fiji U-23

At the 2015 Pacific Games football playoff to reach the semi-finals, Tahitian Manuarii got booked twice and was given a red card. Meanwhile, despite his red card, Tahiti drew that match with 9 players (Thibaut Pito was also booked twice) resulting in their guaranteed place in the semi-finals.

2015 Pacific Games group stage- vs FS Micronesia U-23

Hauata scored a hat trick in Tahiti's record 30–0 decimation of the Federated States of Micronesia national under-23 football team at the 2015 Pacific Games.

2018 FIFA World Cup qualification (OFC) match- vs Solomon Islands

Made his professional international debut when put on for No.18 Tefai Faehau in the 81st minute, playing a mere 9 minutes.

== Honours ==
Tahiti U-23

- Pacific Games: Silver Medalist, 2015
