= Steve Ixoée =

New Caledonian footballer (born 1988)

Steve Ixoee
Personal information
- Full name: Jelen Steve Ixoee
- Date of birth: 6 June 1988 (age 38)
- Place of birth: New Caledonia
- Position: Goalkeeper

Team information
- Current team: AS Magenta

Senior career*
Years	Team	Apps	(Gls)
- AS Magenta

International career
2013–2016	New Caledonia	4	(0)
- * Club domestic league appearances and goals

Steve Ixoee (born 6 June 1988) is a New Caledonian footballer who plays as goalkeeper.

In the 2016 OFC Nations Cup semi-final opposing New Zealand, Ixoee inadvertently let a free kick slip past his hands into the goal; the game ended 1–0 in favor of New Zealand, who eventually won the competition.
