= Kaloran Firiam =

Vanuatuan footballer

Personal information
- Date of birth: 10 December 1994 (age 31)
- Place of birth: Vanuatu
- Height: 1.78 m (5 ft 10 in)
- Position: Goalkeeper

Team information
- Current team: Vanuatu United
- Number: 23

Senior career*
Years	Team	Apps	(Gls)
2014–2018	Tafea F.C.		
2018–2019	Nalkutan F.C.		
2019–2025	Malampa Revivors F.C.		
2026–	Vanuatu United	0	(0)

International career^{‡}
2018–	Vanuatu	2	(0)
Medal record
Men's football
Representing Vanuatu
Pacific Mini Games
Gold medal – first place	2017 Vanuatu
MSG Prime Minister's Cup
Winner	2025 Papua New Guinea
Runner-up	2026 Fiji
- * Club domestic league appearances and goals ‡ National team caps and goals as of 20 February 2019

Kaloran Firiam (born 10 December 1994) is a Vanuatuan footballer who plays as a goalkeeper for Vanuatu United and the Vanuatu national football team.

== Honours ==
Vanuatu

- Pacific Mini Games: Gold Medalist, 2017
- MSG Prime Minister's Cup: 2025; Runner-Up, 2026
