= Roland Bala =

Papua New Guinean footballer

Personal information
- Date of birth: 18 September 1990 (age 36)
- Place of birth: Papua New Guinea
- Height: 1.74 m (5 ft 9 in)
- Positions: Centre-back; left-back

Team information
- Current team: Southern United

Senior career*
Years	Team	Apps	(Gls)
2010–2015	Besta United		
2015–2016	FC Port Moresby		
2016	Coomera Colts		
2017	University Inter		
2017–2018	Southern United	6	(0)
2018	Miramar Rangers		
2018	Team Wellington		

International career^{‡}
2012	Papua New Guinea U23	4	(0)
2016–	Papua New Guinea	2	(0)
Medal record
Men's football
Representing Papua New Guinea
OFC Nations Cup
Runner-up	2016 Papua New Guinea
- * Club domestic league appearances and goals as of 29 June 2016 ‡ National team caps and goals as of 29 June 2016

Roland Bala (born 18 September 1990) is a Papua New Guinean footballer who plays as a defender for Southern United.

While playing for Southern United, Bala was discharged without conviction for indecently assaulting a woman in a Dunedin club. The judge gave him a discharge as Bala is due to have surgery to his knee that would require 12 months recuperation, while if convicted he would have been deported from New Zealand and not had the surgery.

== Honours ==
Papua New Guinea

- OFC Nations Cup: runner-up, 2016
