= Ishmael Pole =

Papua New Guinean footballer

Personal information
- Full name: Ishmael Peter Pole
- Date of birth: 25 January 1993 (age 33)
- Place of birth: Mendi, Papua New Guinea
- Position: Goalkeeper

Team information
- Current team: Hekari United
- Number: 20

Senior career*
| Years | Team | Apps | (Gls) |
| 2014–2020 | Hekari United | | |
| 2021 | Port Moresby Strikers | | |
| 2022– | Gulf Komara | | |
| 2022 | → Lautoka FC (loan) | | |

International career^{‡}
| 2016– | Papua New Guinea | 1 | (0) |
Medal record
Men's football
Representing Papua New Guinea
OFC Nations Cup
| Runner-up | 2016 Papua New Guinea |
Pacific Games
| Bronze medal – third place | 2015 Papua New Guinea |
MSG Prime Minister's Cup
| Winner | 2022 Vanuatu |
- * Club domestic league appearances and goals ‡ National team caps and goals as of 17 July 2019

Ishmael Pole (born 25 January 1993) is a Papua New Guinean footballer who plays as a goalkeeper for Gulf Komara.

== Career ==
After starting out as a striker, Pole later transitioned to goalkeeping.

Pole spent eight years at Hekari United in the Papua New Guinea National Soccer League and Papua New Guinea National Premier League. In April 2022, he joined Gulf Komara. Pole joined Lautoka FC in mid-2022 on loan during qualification for the OFC Champions League.

== Honours ==
Papua New Guinea

- OFC Nations Cup: Runner-up, 2016
- MSG Prime Minister's Cup: 2022

Papua New Guinea U-23

- Pacific Games: Bronze Medalist, 2015
