= Luka Prelevic =

New Zealand footballer

Personal information
- Full name: Luka Prelevic
- Date of birth: 7 September 1995 (age 31)
- Place of birth: Darwin, Northern Territory, Australia
- Position: Attacking midfielder

Team information
- Current team: Aspendale Stingrays

Youth career
- 2012: Central City
- 2013: Melbourne Victory
- 2014: Melbourne City

Senior career*
Years	Team	Apps	(Gls)
2013–2014	Port Melbourne Sharks	29	(6)
2015	Melbourne City NPL	14	(8)
2016–2018	Pascoe Vale	57	(7)
2018–	Aspendale Stingrays		

International career^{‡}
2015	New Zealand U-23	2	(1)
2016	New Zealand	3	(0)
- * Club domestic league appearances and goals as of 28 November 2022 ‡ National team caps and goals as of 29 August 2016

Luka Prelevic (born 7 September 1995), is an Australian-born New Zealand professional footballer who plays as an attacking midfielder for Pascoe Vale FC.

== Club career ==
In 2015, Prelevic was a member of the inaugural Melbourne City NPL squad and won the NPL 1 Rising Star award for the league's best player under the age of 20 that season.

He signed for Pascoe Vale ahead of the 2016 NPL season.

== International career ==
Prelevic was a member of the New Zealand U-23s squad at the 2015 Pacific Games.

He received his first call-up for the All Whites as a late inclusion to 2016 OFC Nations Cup squad to replace the injured Shane Smeltz. He made his senior debut in New Zealand's opening match of that tournament, on 28 May against Fiji.
