= Philip Steven =

Papua New Guinean footballer

Personal information
- Date of birth: 19 January 1995 (age 31)
- Place of birth: Papua New Guinea
- Position: Defender

Team information
- Current team: FC Port Moresby

Senior career*
Years	Team	Apps	(Gls)
2015–	FC Port Moresby		

International career^{‡}
2011	Papua New Guinea U17	4	(0)
2013	Papua New Guinea U20	4	(0)
2016–	Papua New Guinea	3	(0)
Medal record
Men's football
Representing Papua New Guinea
OFC Nations Cup
Runner-up	2016 Papua New Guinea
MSG Prime Minister's Cup
Winner	2022 Vanuatu
Runner-up	2025 Papua New Guinea
- * Club domestic league appearances and goals as of 30 June 2016 ‡ National team caps and goals as of 30 June 2016

Philip Steven (born 19 January 1995) is a Papua New Guinean footballer who plays as a defender for FC Port Moresby in the Papua New Guinea National Soccer League.

== Honours ==
Papua New Guinea

- OFC Nations Cup: runner-up, 2016
- MSG Prime Minister's Cup: 2022; runner-up, 2025
