= Tauatua Lucas =

Tahitian footballer (born 1994)

Personal information
- Date of birth: 23 November 1994 (age 31)
- Place of birth: Tahiti
- Position: Striker

Team information
- Current team: A.S. Tefana

Senior career*
Years	Team	Apps	(Gls)
2014–	A.S. Tefana		(23)

International career^{‡}
2015–	Tahiti	2	(0)
Medal record
Men's football
Representing Tahiti
Pacific Games
Silver medal – second place	2015 Papua New Guinea
- * Club domestic league appearances and goals as of 24 June 2016 ‡ National team caps and goals as of 24 June 2016

Tauatua Lucas (born 23 November 1994) is a Tahitian footballer who plays as a striker for A.S. Tefana in the Tahiti Ligue 1.

== Honours ==
Tahiti U-23

- Pacific Games: Silver Medalist, 2015
