= Thierry Sardo =

French football coach (1967–2025)

Thierry Sardo (14 June 1967 – 1 November 2025) was a French football coach. He was appointed head coach of the New Caledonia national team on 3 February 2015. Sardo was born in Toulon, France on 14 June 1967, and died on 1st November 2025, at the age of 58.

== Managerial statistics ==
Team	From	To	Record				
Team	From	To	G	W	D	L	Win %
New Caledonia	3 February 2015	1 January 2022	18	4	5	9	22.22
