= Remy Kalsrap =

Vanuatuan footballer

Personal information
- Date of birth: 20 January 1996 (age 30)
- Place of birth: Vanuatu
- Position: Defender

Team information
- Current team: Erakor Golden Star

Senior career*
Years	Team	Apps	(Gls)
2012–	Erakor Golden Star		

International career^{‡}
2013	Vanuatu U17	4	(1)
2014	Vanuatu U20	5	(0)
2015–	Vanuatu U23	2	(0)
2015–	Vanuatu	2	(0)
- * Club domestic league appearances and goals as of 24 November 2017 ‡ National team caps and goals as of 24 November 2017

Remy Kalsrap (born 20 January 1996) is a Vanuatuan footballer who plays as a defender for Erakor Golden Star in the Port Vila Football League and the Vanuatu national football team. He made his debut for the national team on November 7, 2015, in a 1–1 draw against Fiji.

He has capped at the under-17 and under-20 levels.
