= Mauarii Tehina =

Tahitian footballer (born 1993)

Personal information
- Date of birth: 16 October 1993 (age 33)
- Place of birth: Tahiti
- Position: Midfielder

Team information
- Current team: A.S. Vénus

Senior career*
Years	Team	Apps	(Gls)
2015–	A.S. Vénus		

International career^{‡}
2015–	Tahiti	1	(0)
Medal record
Men's football
Representing Tahiti
Pacific Games
Silver medal – second place	2015 Papua New Guinea
- * Club domestic league appearances and goals as of 24 June 2016 ‡ National team caps and goals as of 24 June 2016

Mauarii Tehina (born 16 October 1993) is a Tahitian footballer who plays as a midfielder for A.S. Vénus in the Tahiti Ligue 1.

== Honours ==
Tahiti U-23

- Pacific Games: Silver Medalist, 2015
