= Jacob Sabua =

Papua New Guinean footballer (born 1994)

Personal information
- Full name: Jacob Sabua
- Date of birth: 25 August 1994 (age 32)
- Place of birth: Buang, Morobe Province, Papua New Guinea
- Position: Midfielder

Team information
- Current team: Lae City FC

Youth career
- 2006–2008: Nawae Secondary School
- 2008–2009: PNGFA Soccer Academy Lae

Senior career*
Years	Team	Apps	(Gls)
2009–2014	Besta United PNG		
2014–2015	Oro		
2015–2016	FC Port Moresby		
2016–2017	Madang Fox		
2017	Lae City Dwellers		
2017–2018	Malaita Kingz		
2018–	Lae City FC		

International career
2011	Papua New Guinea U-17	4	(1)
2013	Papua New Guinea U-20	5	(0)
2015	Papua New Guinea U-23	6	(1)
2016–	Papua New Guinea	19	(0)
Medal record
Men's football
Representing Papua New Guinea
OFC Nations Cup
Runner-up	2016 Papua New Guinea
Pacific Games
Bronze medal – third place	2015 Papua New Guinea
- * Club domestic league appearances and goals

Jacob Sabua (born 25 August 1994) is a Papua New Guinean footballer who plays as a midfielder for Lae City FC. He made his debut for the national team on May 29, 2016 in their 1–1 draw at the 2016 OFC Nations Cup against the New Caledonia.

== Honours ==
Papua New Guinea

- OFC Nations Cup: Runner-up, 2016

Papua New Guinea U-23

- Pacific Games: Bronze Medalist, 2015
