= Antonio Tuivuna =

Fijian footballer

Personal information
- Full name: Antonio Tuivuna
- Date of birth: 20 March 1995 (age 31)
- Place of birth: Navala, Ba, Fiji
- Height: 1.91 m (6 ft 3 in)
- Positions: Defender; midfielder

Team information
- Current team: Dreketi
- Number: 6

Youth career
- Ba Sangam College
- Ba

Senior career*
Years	Team	Apps	(Gls)
2012–2014	Ba		
2014–2015	Suva		
2015–2016	Nadi		
2016–2017	Ba		
2017–2018	Labasa		
2018–	Dreketi		

International career^{‡}
2013–2015	Fiji U-20	10	(2)
2015–	Fiji U-23	6	(11)
2015–	Fiji	4	(1)
Medal record
Men's football
Representing Fiji
OFC U-20 Championship
Runner-up	2013 Fiji
Pacific Mini Games
Silver medal – second place	2017 Vanuatu
- * Club domestic league appearances and goals as of 8 Februari 2018 ‡ National team caps and goals as of 15 December 2017

Antonio Tuivuna (born 20 March 1995) is a Fijian footballer who plays as a midfielder for Dreketi.

== Career ==
Tuivana advanced through the youth ranks at Ba, making his senior debut in 2012 at the age of seventeen. After two years with the club, he departed on a free transfer to Suva A season later, Tuivana moved to Nadi before moving back to Ba on a $5,000 FJD transfer. In 2017 he moved to the Labasa, known as the Babasiga Lions.

== International career ==
Tuivuna made his debut for the senior team in November 2015 in a 1-1 draw against Vanuatu. Before this he was a member of the U20's and the U23's. With the U20's he won the 2014 OFC U-20 Championship and qualified for the 2015 FIFA U-20 World Cup. This was the first time that Fiji had qualified for a FIFA World Cup event. Tuivuna played in all three group matches, including in the historical 3-0 victory against Honduras.

=== International goals ===
Scores and results list Fiji's goal tally first.

No	Date	Venue	Opponent	Score	Result	Competition
1.	15 December 2017	Port Vila Municipal Stadium, Port Vila, Vanuatu	New Caledonia	3–1	4–1	2017 Pacific Mini Games

== Honours ==
Fiji

- Pacific Mini Games: Silver Medalist, 2017

Fiji U20

- OFC U-20 Championship: Runner-up, 2013
