= Allen Peter =

Solomon Islands footballer

Personal information
- Full name: Allen Peter
- Date of birth: 15 September 1995 (age 31)
- Place of birth: Solomon Islands
- Position: Defender

Team information
- Current team: Laugu United

Senior career*
Years	Team	Apps	(Gls)
2011–2016	Malaita Kingz		
2016–2018	Solomon Warriors		
2018-2019	Kossa		
2019–	Laugu United		

International career^{‡}
2014	Solomon Islands U-20	5	(0)
2015–	Solomon Islands U-23	3	(0)
2016–	Solomon Islands	10	(0)
Medal record
Representing Solomon Islands
Pacific Games
Silver medal – second place	2023 Solomon Islands
MSG Prime Minister's Cup
Winner	2023 New Caledonia
- * Club domestic league appearances and goals as of 24 March 2016 ‡ National team caps and goals as of 18 July 2019

Allen Peter (born 15 September 1995) is a Solomon Islands footballer who plays as a defender for Laugu United. He made his debut for the national team on March 24, 2016 in their 2–0 victory against Papua New Guinea.

== Honours ==
Solomon Islands

- Pacific Games: Silver Medalist, 2023
- MSG Prime Minister's Cup: 2023
