= Kolinio Sivoki =

Fijian footballer

Personal information
- Full name: Kolinio Vakarauvanua Sivoki
- Date of birth: 10 March 1995 (age 31)
- Place of birth: Fiji
- Height: 1.86 m (6 ft 1 in)
- Position: Defender

Team information
- Current team: Lautoka
- Number: 17

Youth career
- 2001–2008: Vashist Muni Primary School
- 2008–2010: Vashist Muni College
- 2010–2012: Nasinu Muslim College
- 2012–2013: Rewa

Senior career*
Years	Team	Apps	(Gls)
2011–2013	Rewa		
2013–2015	Suva		
2015–	Lautoka		

International career^{‡}
2013–2015	Fiji U-20	11	(0)
2015–	Fiji U-23	5	(0)
2015–	Fiji	8	(1)
Medal record
Men's football
Representing Fiji
OFC U-20 Championship
Winner	2014 Fiji
Runner-up	2013 Fiji
Pacific Mini Games
Silver medal – second place	2017 Vanuatu
- * Club domestic league appearances and goals as of 30 September 2017 ‡ National team caps and goals as of 28 September 2017

Kolinio Sivoki (born 10 March 1995) is a Fijian footballer who plays as a defender for Lautoka.

== International career ==
In 2017, Sivoki was called up by coach Juan Carlos Buzzetti for the Fiji national football team. He made his debut on August 27, 2015, in a 6–0 win against American Samoa. Sivoki played the whole 90 minutes. He scored his first and so far his only goal on May 28, 2017 in a 1-0 win against the Solomon Islands.

=== International goals ===
Scores and results list Fiji's goal tally first.

No	Date	Venue	Opponent	Score	Result	Competition
1.	28 May 2017	Churchill Park, Lautoka, Fiji	Solomon Islands	1–0	1–0	Friendly

== Honours ==
Fiji

- Pacific Mini Games: Silver Medalist, 2017

Fiji U20

- OFC U-20 Championship: 2014; Runner-up, 2013
