= Nickel Chand =

Fijian footballer

Personal information
- Full name: Nickel Nishal Chand
- Date of birth: 28 July 1995 (age 31)
- Place of birth: Nabilo, Tailevu, Fiji
- Height: 1.69 m (5 ft 7 in)
- Position: Attacking midfielder

Team information
- Current team: Lami

Youth career
- Suva

Senior career*
| Years | Team | Apps | (Gls) |
| 2012–2016 | Suva | | |
| 2017 | Labasa | | |
| 2017– | Lami | | |
| 2022 | → Heatherton United (loan) | 3 | (0) |

International career^{‡}
| 2011 | Fiji U17 | 1 | (0) |
| 2013–2015 | Fiji U20 | 8 | (2) |
| 2015–2016 | Fiji U23 | 6 | (1) |
| 2016– | Fiji | 2 | (0) |
- * Club domestic league appearances and goals as of 12 June 2016 ‡ National team caps and goals as of 13 December 2022

Nickel Nishal Chand (born 28 July 1995) is a Fijian footballer who plays as a midfielder for Lami in the National Football League.

== International career ==
Chand was selected for the Fiji national under-20 team to compete at the 2015 FIFA U-20 World Cup in May 2015. he played in all three of Fiji's group matches against Germany, Honduras and Uzbekistan. He was also selected by the national under-23 team for the 2015 Pacific Games football tournament and scored a goal in their opening game against Vanuatu.

On 29 May 2016 Chand made his debut for the senior national team at the 2016 OFC Nations Cup in their 3–1 loss against New Zealand.
