= Jale Dreloa =

Fijian footballer

Personal information
- Full name: Jale Dreloa
- Date of birth: 21 April 1995 (age 31)
- Place of birth: Bua, Fiji
- Height: 1.87 m (6 ft 2 in)
- Position: Central defender

Team information
- Current team: Labasa
- Number: 4

Youth career
- Suva

Senior career*
Years	Team	Apps	(Gls)
2012–2017	Suva		
2017–	Labasa		

International career^{‡}
2011	Fiji U-17	4	(0)
2013–2015	Fiji U-20	11	(2)
2015–2016	Fiji U-23	8	(0)
2015–	Fiji	4	(0)
Medal record
Men's football
Representing Fiji
OFC U-20 Championship
Winner	2014 Fiji
Runner-up	2013 Fiji
- * Club domestic league appearances and goals as of 20 November 2017 ‡ National team caps and goals as of 9 November 2015

Jale Dreloa (born 21 April 1995) is a Fijian footballer who plays as a defender for Labasa in the National Football League and the Fiji national football team.

== Club career ==
Until September 2017 Dreloa had never played for any other district than Suva. However, in September 2017 he moved to Labasa.

== National team ==
Dreloa has played for every representing Fiji team. From the u17's in 2011 to the national team in 2015. He has played at the 2015 FIFA U-20 World Cup and at the 2016 Summer Olympics with Fiji's under 23's. He made his debut for the national team on August 19, 2015 in a friendly game against Tonga. Fiji won the game by 5 goals to nil.

== Honours ==
Fiji U20

- OFC U-20 Championship: 2014; Runner-up, 2013
