= Fred Tissot =

Tahitian footballer (born 1995)

Personal information
- Date of birth: 14 July 1995 (age 31)
- Place of birth: Tahiti
- Position: Striker

Team information
- Current team: A.S. Central Sport

Senior career*
Years	Team	Apps	(Gls)
2015–	A.S. Central Sport		(24)

International career^{‡}
2015–	Tahiti	5	(0)
Medal record
Men's football
Representing Tahiti
Pacific Games
Silver medal – second place	2015 Papua New Guinea
- * Club domestic league appearances and goals as of 24 June 2016 ‡ National team caps and goals as of 24 June 2016

Fred Tissot (pronounced [fʁɛd tiso]; born 14 July 1995) is a Tahitian footballer who plays as a striker for A.S.Central Sport in the Tahiti Ligue 1.

He was born in Taiohae.

== Honours ==
Tahiti U-23

- Pacific Games: Silver Medalist, 2015
