= Patrick Aisa =

Papua New Guinean footballer

Personal information
- Date of birth: 6 July 1994 (age 32)
- Place of birth: Papua New Guinea
- Position: Striker

Team information
- Current team: Hekari United F.C

Senior career*
Years	Team	Apps	(Gls)
2014–2015	Eastern Stars F.C.		
2015–2017	Rapatona		
2017	Madang Fox		
2017–	Hamilton Wanderers		

International career^{‡}
2013	Papua New Guinea U20	4	(1)
2014–	Papua New Guinea	12	(3)
Medal record
Men's football
Representing Papua New Guinea
OFC Nations Cup
Runner-up	2016 Papua New Guinea
Pacific Games
Bronze medal – third place	2015 Papua New Guinea
- * Club domestic league appearances and goals as of 21 June 2016 ‡ National team caps and goals as of 20 July 2019

Patrick Aisa (born 6 July 1994) is a Papua New Guinean footballer who plays as a striker for Hekari United F.C. in the Papua New Guinea National Soccer League.

== International career ==
=== International goals ===
Scores and results list Papua New Guinea's goal tally first.

No.	Date	Venue	Opponent	Score	Result	Competition
1.	28 March 2017	Stade Pater, Papeete, Tahiti	Tahiti	1–0	2–1	2018 FIFA World Cup qualification
2.	9 June 2017	Lawson Tama Stadium, Honiara, Solomon Islands	Solomon Islands	2–2	2–3	2018 FIFA World Cup qualification
3.	18 July 2019	National Soccer Stadium, Apia, Samoa	Tonga	6–0	8–0	2019 Pacific Games

== Honours ==
Papua New Guinea

- OFC Nations Cup: Runner-up, 2016

Papua New Guinea U-23

- Pacific Games: Bronze Medalist, 2015
