= Juan Carlos Buzzetti =

Uruguayan football manager (born 1945)

Personal information
- Full name: Juan Carlos Buzzetti
- Date of birth: 26 February 1945 (age 81)
- Place of birth: Montevideo, Uruguay

Managerial career
- Years: Team
- 2000–2004: Vanuatu
- 2006–2009: Fiji
- 2011–2015: Fiji
- 2022: Vanuatu
Medal record
Men's football
Representing Fiji (as manager)
OFC Nations Cup
| Third place | 2008 Oceania |
OFC U-20 Championship
| Runner-up | 2007 New Zealand |
Pacific Games
| Silver medal – second place | 2007 Samoa |
Representing Vanuatu (as manager)
Pacific Games
| Bronze medal – third place | 2003 Fiji |

Juan Carlos Buzzetti (born 26 February 1945 in Montevideo) is a Uruguayan football manager who last coached the Fiji national football team.

He managed the national team of Vanuatu from 2000 to 2004 and Fiji from 2006 to 2009. As of December 2011, he returned to managing Fiji again.

== Honours ==
=== Manager ===
Fiji

- OFC Nations Cup: 3rd place, 2008
- Pacific Games: Silver Medalist, 2007

Fiji U20

- OFC U-20 Championship: Runner-Up, 2007

Vanuatu

- Pacific Games: Bronze Medalist, 2003
