= Ratu Nakalevu =

Fijian footballer

Personal information
- Full name: Ratu Savenaca Robosenawa Inibuk Nakalevu
- Date of birth: 7 March 1994 (age 32)
- Place of birth: Wailotua, Tailevu, Fiji
- Height: 1.70 m (5 ft 7 in)
- Position: Midfielder

Team information
- Current team: Ba
- Number: 10

Youth career
- Rewa

Senior career*
Years	Team	Apps	(Gls)
2012–2018	Rewa		
2018–	Ba		

International career
2013	Fiji U-20	2	(1)
2015–2016	Fiji U-23	10	(1)
2016–	Fiji	1	(0)
Medal record
Men's football
Representing Fiji
OFC U-20 Championship
Runner-up	2013 Fiji
- * Club domestic league appearances and goals as of 10 August 2016

Ratu Savenaca Nakalevu (born 7 March 1994) is a Fijian footballer who plays as a midfielder for Ba in the National Football League.

== Club career ==
Nakalevu came through the youth ranks of Rewa and made his debut for the club in 2012. In 2018 he moved to Ba to play in the 2018 OFC Champions League.

== International career ==
Nakalevu was part of the Fiji national under-23 team for the 2016 Summer Olympics. He played in all three of Fiji's group matches against South Korea, Mexico and Germany.

On 26 June 2016, he made his senior debut for the national team in their friendly match against Malaysia.

== Honours ==
Fiji U20

- OFC U-20 Championship: Runner-up, 2013
