= Bill Nicholls (Vanuatuan footballer) =

Ni-Vanuatu footballer

Personal information
- Full name: Patti Bill Nicholls
- Date of birth: 3 June 1993 (age 33)
- Place of birth: Vanuatu
- Height: 1.80 m (5 ft 11 in)
- Position: Forward

Team information
- Current team: Magenta
- Number: 20

Senior career*
Years	Team	Apps	(Gls)
–2013	Magenta		
2013	Tafea		
2014	Magenta		
2014–2015	Tafea		
2015	Tupuji Imere		
2015–2016	Tafea		
2016	Magenta		
2016–2017	Tupuji Imere		
2017–	Magenta		

International career^{‡}
2015	Vanuatu U23	5	(11)
2015–	Vanuatu	8	(6)
Medal record
Men's football
Representing Vanuatu
OFC U-20 Championship
Third place	2013 Fiji
- * Club domestic league appearances and goals as of 25 February 2017 ‡ National team caps and goals as of 18 July 2019

Patti Bill Nicholls (born 3 June 1993) is a Ni-Vanuatu footballer who plays as a forward for Magenta. He made his debut for the national team in November 2015 in their 2–1 win against Fiji in which he scored the second goal.

== Personal life ==
Bill is the son of former Vanuatu national rep, Morsen Nicholls, who now lives in New Caledonia.

== Career statistics ==
Scores and results list Vanuatu's goal tally first, score column indicates score after each Nicholls goal.

List of international goals scored by Bill Nicholls
No.	Date	Venue	Opponent	Score	Result	Competition
1	10 November 2015	Port Vila Municipal Stadium, Port Vila, Vanuatu	Fiji	2–0	2–1	Friendly
2	15 July 2019	National Soccer Stadium, Apia, Samoa	Tonga	7–0	14–0	2019 Pacific Games
3	15 July 2019	National Soccer Stadium, Apia, Samoa	Tonga	10–0	14–0	2019 Pacific Games
4	15 July 2019	National Soccer Stadium, Apia, Samoa	Tonga	12–0	14–0	2019 Pacific Games
5	15 July 2019	National Soccer Stadium, Apia, Samoa	Tonga	14–0	14–0	2019 Pacific Games
6	18 July 2019	National Soccer Stadium, Apia, Samoa	Samoa	8–0	11–0	2019 Pacific Games

== Honours ==
Vanuatu U20

- OFC U-20 Championship: 3rd place, 2013
