= Napolioni Qasevakatini =

Fijian footballer

Personal information
- Full name: Napolioni Qasevakatini
- Date of birth: 17 March 1993 (age 33)
- Place of birth: Fiji
- Position: Striker

Team information
- Current team: Nadi F.C.

Youth career
- Nadi F.C.

Senior career*
Years	Team	Apps	(Gls)
2013–2015	Nadi F.C.		
2015	Suva F.C.		
2016–	Nadi F.C.		(6)

International career^{‡}
2013	Fiji U-20	3	(1)
2015–	Fiji U-23	6	(9)
2015–	Fiji	7	(4)
Medal record
Men's football
Representing Fiji
OFC U-20 Championship
Runner-up	2013 Fiji
Pacific Mini Games
Silver medal – second place	2017 Vanuatu
- * Club domestic league appearances and goals as of 22 February 2017 ‡ National team caps and goals as of 12 December 2017

Napolioni Qasevakatini (born 17 March 1993) is a Fijian footballer who plays as a striker for Nadi F.C.

== International career ==
=== International goals ===
Scores and results list Fiji's goal tally first.

No	Date	Venue	Opponent	Score	Result	Competition
1.	19 August 2015	Govind Park, Ba, Fiji	Tonga	5–0	5–0	Friendly
2.	27 August 2015	Prince Charles Park, Nadi, Fiji	American Samoa	3–0	6–0	Friendly
3.	27 August 2015	Prince Charles Park, Nadi, Fiji	American Samoa	6–0	6–0	Friendly
4.	12 December 2017	Port Vila Municipal Stadium, Port Vila, Vanuatu	Tonga	2–0	4–0	2017 Pacific Mini Games

== Honours ==
Fiji

- Pacific Mini Games: Silver Medalist, 2017

Fiji U20

- OFC U-20 Championship: Runner-up, 2013
