= Iosefo Verevou =

Fijian footballer

Personal information
- Full name: Iosefo Verevou
- Date of birth: 5 January 1996 (age 30)
- Place of birth: Naselai, Rewa, Fiji
- Height: 1.87 m (6 ft 2 in)
- Position: Forward

Team information
- Current team: Tailevu Naitasiri

Youth career
- Rewa

Senior career*
Years	Team	Apps	(Gls)
2011–2025	Rewa	90+	(22+)
2026–	Tailevu Naitasiri		

International career^{‡}
2011–2013	Fiji U-17	8	(6)
2015	Fiji U-20	3	(2)
2015–2016	Fiji U-23	8	(5)
2015–2017	Fiji	10	(0)
- * Club domestic league appearances and goals as of 30 September 2017 ‡ National team caps and goals as of 30 September 2017

Iosefo Verevou (born 5 January 1996) is a Fijian footballer who plays as a forward for Tailevu Naitasiri in the Fiji National Football League.

== Early career ==
Verevou started playing football at an early age and was a star football player for his high school team Saraswati College in Nausori.

He came up through the Rewa FC youth system and made his first team debut at the age of 14. With this feat he became the youngest player to play for a semi-professional football team in Fiji. After 7 years at Rewa, he seemed to move to Suva in January 2018 however at the end of January the move was cancelled for an unclear reason.

== International career ==
Verevou was a member of Fiji's U-20 national team at the 2015 FIFA U-20 World Cup in New Zealand. During the tournament, he scored with a header in an 8-1 defeat to Germany and also scored a goal in a 3-0 victory over Honduras.

On 7 November 2015, he made his senior debut for the national team in their friendly match against Vanuatu.

On 16 July 2016, Verevou was named in Fiji's 18-man squad for the 2016 Summer Olympics in Rio de Janeiro.

== Personal life ==
His elder brother, Epeli Saukuru, is also a footballer who represents Fiji.

== Honours ==
=== Club ===
Rewa

- Battle of the Giants tournament : 2015, 2017
- Fiji Football Association Cup Tournament : 2017

=== Individual ===
- FASANOC Sportsman of the Year : 2015
