= Football in French Polynesia =

- Country: French Polynesia
- Governing body: Fédération Tahitienne de Football
- National teams: Tahiti national football team Tahiti women's national football team

Club competitions
- Ligue 1 Ligue 2 Ligue 2 Moorea; Ligue 2 Raiatea; Jeux des Marquises; Festival des Îles; Coupe Tahiti Nui

International competitions
- OFC Professional League; OFC Champions League

The sport of football in French Polynesia is run by the Fédération Tahitienne de Football. The association administers the national football team. With 146 association football clubs and over 11,200 registered players, football is the most popular sport among the inhabitants on the island of Tahiti.

== League system ==
The league system in French Polynesia is divided into 4 tiers/divisions. The premier division is the Ligue 1 Vini in which 13 clubs currently compete for the championship. The champions of this league also qualify for the OFC Champions League qualifier stage. The bottom seven teams in this league play in a relegation play-off to decide which two clubs get relegated to the Ligue 2.

In Ligue 2, the bottom clubs either get relegated to the Ligue 2 Moorea or Ligue 2 Raiatea as required. Ligue 2 also contains 8 reserve teams from Ligue 1 Vini.

Clubs from the Ligue 2 Moorea and Ligue 2 Raiatea are often relegated to Ligue 3 where there are only 3 first team clubs and 6 reserve teams from Ligue 2 and Ligue 1 Vini.

Level	League(s)/Division(s)	
1	Ligue 1 Vini; 13 clubs	
	↓↑ 2 clubs	
2	Ligue 2; 5 clubs + 8 Reserve teams	
3	Ligue 2 Moorea; 8 clubs	Ligue 2 Raiatea 3 clubs
4	Ligue 3 3 clubs + 6 Reserve teams	

== French Polynesia football venues ==
Stadium	Capacity	City
Stade Pater Te Hono Nui	11,700	Pīraʻe
Stade Hamuta	10,000	Papeete
