= 2013 OFC U-20 Championship =

Tournament details
- Host country: Fiji
- Dates: 21–29 March
- Teams: 5 (from 1 confederation)
- Venue: 2 (in 2 host cities)

Final positions
- Champions: New Zealand (5th title)
- Runners-up: Fiji
- Third place: Vanuatu
- Fourth place: New Caledonia

Tournament statistics
- Matches played: 10
- Goals scored: 52 (5.2 per match)
- Top scorer: (Fiji) Rusiate Matarerega
- Best player: (New Zealand) Louis Fenton

The 2013 OFC U-20 Championship was the 19th edition of the OFC Under 20 Qualifying Tournament, the biennial football championship of Oceania (OFC). The competition was held at two venues in Fiji, from the 21 to 29 March, with the winner qualifying as Oceania's representative at the 2013 FIFA U-20 World Cup.

New Zealand, the previous title holders, won this year's edition.

== Participating teams ==
- Fiji (Host Nation)
- New Caledonia
- New Zealand
- Papua New Guinea
- Vanuatu

== Venues ==
Four matchdays were held at Churchill Park in Lautoka with the last matchday being held at Govind Park in Ba.

== Group stage ==
The competition draw was conducted on February 8 at the headquarters of the Oceania confederation in Auckland, New Zealand.

Team	Pld	W	D	L	GF	GA	GD	Pts
New Zealand	4	4	0	0	13	2	+11	12
Fiji	4	3	0	1	8	8	0	9
Vanuatu	4	2	0	2	12	7	+5	6
New Caledonia	4	1	0	3	15	13	+2	3
Papua New Guinea	4	0	0	4	4	22	−18	0

21 March 2013
14:00 UTC+12

Fiji	3–2	Vanuatu
Rao 58'; Qasevakatini 68'; Matarerega 84'	Report	Damalip 5'; Manuhi 23'

Churchull Park, Lautoka
Attendance: 2,000
Referee: Norbert Hauata (Tahiti)
21 March 2013
16:30 UTC+12

Papua New Guinea	0–5	New Zealand
		Fenton 5' (pen.), 11'; Watson 44'; Higham 79'; Boyd 81' (pen.)

Churchull Park, Lautoka
Attendance: 1,500
Referee: Gerald Oiaka (Solomon Islands)

23 March 2013
14:00 UTC+12

Vanuatu	0–1	New Zealand
		Elia 23'

Churchull Park, Lautoka
Attendance: 2,300
Referee: Bertrand Billon (New Caledonia)
23 March 2013
16:30 UTC+12

Fiji	3–2	New Caledonia
Nakalevu 9'; Matarerega 33', 43'		Waelua 28'; Wadriako 88'

Churchull Park, Lautoka
Attendance: 2,500
Referee: Kader Zitouni (Tahiti)

25 March 2013
14:00 UTC+12

New Zealand	3–2	New Caledonia
Fenton 29' (pen.); Elia 51'; Turner 56'		Xalite 17'; Wadriako 25'

Churchull Park, Lautoka
Attendance: 500
Referee: Salesh Sand (Fiji)
25 March 2013
16:30 UTC+12

Vanuatu	6–1	Papua New Guinea
Damalip 25', 44', 58'; Shem 48'; Tasso 64'; Tabilip 88'		Aisa 1'

Churchull Park, Lautoka
Attendance: 500
Referee: Norbert Hauata (Tahiti)

27 March 2013
14:00 UTC+12

New Caledonia	9–3	Papua New Guinea
Xalite 24' (pen.), 30'; Bob 28', 61'; Ranchain 57', 64'; Decoire 71'; Nonmeu 72'; Wadra 77'	Report	Awele 4'; Komolong 19'; Airem 39'

Churchull Park, Lautoka
Referee: Gerald Oiaka (Solomon Islands)
27 March 2013
16:30 UTC+12

New Zealand	4–0	Fiji
Fenton 48' (pen.); Howieson 67'; Watson 69'; Thomas 83'

Churchull Park, Lautoka
Referee: Bertrand Billon (New Caledonia)

29 March 2013
14:00 UTC+12

Papua New Guinea	0–2	Fiji
		Matarerega 13', 39'

Govind Park, Ba
Referee: Kader Zitouni (Tahiti)
29 March 2013
16:30 UTC+12

New Caledonia	2–4	Vanuatu
Waelua 69'; 84' (o.g.)		Kaltack 9', 51', 64'; Tari 73'

Govind Park, Ba
Referee: Salesh Sand (Fiji)

== Awards ==
The Golden Ball Award was awarded to the most outstanding player of the tournament. The Golden Glove Award was awarded to the best goalkeeper of the tournament. The Golden Boot Award was awarded to the top scorer of the tournament. The Fair Play Award was awarded to the team with the best disciplinary record at the tournament.

Award	Recipient
Golden Ball	(New Zealand) Louis Fenton
Golden Glove	(New Zealand) Max Crocombe
Golden Boot	(Fiji) Rusiate Matarerega (5 goals)
Fair Play Award	Vanuatu
