= Football at the 2017 Pacific Mini Games – Men's team squads =

The following is the squad list for the 2017 Pacific Mini Games.

== Squads ==
=== Fiji ===
Head coach: (France) Christophe Gamel

| No. | Pos. | Player | Date of birth (age) | Caps | Goals | Club |
|---|---|---|---|---|---|---|
| 1 | GK | Simione Tamanisau | 5 June 1982 (aged 35) | 32 | 0 | (Fiji Football Association) Rewa |
| 2 | DF | Ilaitia Tuilau | 8 May 1987 (aged 30) | 11 | 0 | (Fiji Football Association) Lautoka |
| 3 | DF | Kavaia Rawaqa | 20 September 1990 (aged 27) | 5 | 0 | (Fiji Football Association) Lautoka |
| 5 | DF | Remueru Tekiate (c) | 7 August 1990 (aged 27) | 13 | 0 | (Fiji Football Association) Ba |
| 6 | MF | Narendra Rao | 27 June 1995 (aged 22) | 2 | 0 | (Fiji Football Association) Ba |
| 7 | MF | Sitiveni Cavuilagi | 26 July 1994 (aged 23) | 1 | 0 | (Fiji Football Association) Ba |
| 8 | FW | Setareki Hughes | 8 June 1995 (aged 22) | 11 | 0 | (Fiji Football Association) Suva |
| 9 | FW | Rusiate Matarerega | 17 January 1993 (aged 24) | 3 | 0 | (Fiji Football Association) Nadi |
| 10 | MF | Christopher Wasasala | 31 December 1994 (aged 22) | 6 | 0 | (Fiji Football Association) Lautoka |
| 11 | MF | Madhwan Goundar | 27 December 1988 (aged 28) | 2 | 0 | (Fiji Football Association) Rewa |
| 12 | MF | Tevita Waranaivalu | 16 September 1995 (aged 22) | 5 | 1 | (Fiji Football Association) Rewa |
| 13 | DF | Rupeni Rabici | 27 November 1996 (aged 21) | 1 | 0 | (Fiji Football Association) Nadi |
| 14 | MF | Al-Taaf Sahib | 12 September 1995 (aged 22) | 0 | 0 | (New Zealand Football) Bay Olympic |
| 15 | FW | Napolioni Qasevakatini | 17 March 1993 (aged 24) | 4 | 3 | (Fiji Football Association) Nadi |
| 16 | DF | Vuniuci Tikomaimereke | 7 June 1990 (aged 27) | 1 | 0 | (Fiji Football Association) Rewa |
| 17 | MF | Dave Radrigai | 15 March 1990 (aged 27) | 9 | 0 | (Fiji Football Association) Lautoka |
| 18 | DF | Laisenia Naioko | 14 October 1990 (aged 27) | 9 | 0 | (Fiji Football Association) Ba |
| 19 | MF | Ame Votoniu | 12 August 1985 (aged 32) | 1 | 0 | (Fiji Football Association) Nadi |
| 20 | GK | Tevita Koroi | 12 April 1994 (aged 23) | 4 | 0 | (Fiji Football Association) Suva |
| 21 | MF | Antonio Tuivuna | 20 March 1995 (aged 22) | 3 | 0 | (Fiji Football Association) Labasa |
| 22 | MF | Epeli Saukuru | 4 August 1988 (aged 29) | 7 | 2 | (Fiji Football Association) Rewa |
| 23 | DF | Kolinio Sivoki | 10 March 1995 (aged 22) | 9 | 1 | (Fiji Football Association) Lautoka |
| 24 | FW | Saula Waqa | 12 October 1995 (aged 22) | 5 | 1 | (Fiji Football Association) Ba |

=== New Caledonia ===
Head coach: Francois Tartas

| No. | Pos. | Player | Date of birth (age) | Caps | Goals | Club |
|---|---|---|---|---|---|---|
| 1 | GK | Mickael Ulile | 16 July 1997 (aged 20) | 3 | 0 | (New Caledonian Football Federation) Magenta |
| 2 | DF | Johannes Bernole | 8 May 1998 (aged 19) | 0 | 0 | (New Caledonian Football Federation) Hienghène Sport |
| 3 | DF | Jean-Marc Kaudre | 7 February 1999 (aged 18) | 0 | 0 | (New Caledonian Football Federation) Païta |
| 4 | MF | Pothin Poma (c) | 13 February 1997 (aged 20) | 1 | 0 | (New Caledonian Football Federation) Hienghène Sport |
| 5 | DF | Dominique Wel | 16 June 1997 (aged 20) | 0 | 0 | (New Caledonian Football Federation) Métropole |
| 6 | MF | Renzo Wéjième | 9 September 1999 (aged 18) | 0 | 0 | (New Caledonian Football Federation) Magenta |
| 7 | MF | Gaétan Gope-Iwate | 5 October 1998 (aged 19) | 0 | 0 | (New Caledonian Football Federation) Wetr |
| 8 | MF | Marino Akapo | 26 October 1999 (aged 18) | 0 | 0 | (New Caledonian Football Federation) Païta |
| 9 | FW | Warren Houala | 26 June 1997 (aged 20) | 2 | 0 | (New Caledonian Football Federation) Hienghène Sport |
| 10 | MF | Romaric Luépack | 5 October 1997 (aged 20) | 0 | 0 | (New Caledonian Football Federation) Wetr |
| 11 | MF | Shene Wélépane | 9 December 1997 (aged 19) | 2 | 0 | (New Caledonian Football Federation) Magenta |
| 12 | DF | Maki Romone | 28 May 1998 (aged 19) | 0 | 0 | (New Caledonian Football Federation) Wetr |
| 13 | DF | Elo Gowé | 13 August 1999 (aged 18) | 0 | 0 | (New Caledonian Football Federation) Mont-Dore |
| 14 | FW | Henri Boucheron | 20 May 1998 (aged 19) | 0 | 0 | (New Caledonian Football Federation) Magenta |
| 15 | DF | Clarence Nyipie | 3 April 1999 (aged 18) | 0 | 0 | (New Caledonian Football Federation) Païta |
| 16 | GK | Nathanaël Hlemu | 22 August 1998 (aged 19) | 0 | 0 | (New Caledonian Football Federation) Gaïtcha FCN |
| 17 | FW | Jean Baptiste Waitreü | 23 January 1997 (aged 20) | 0 | 0 | (New Caledonian Football Federation) Gaïtcha FCN |
| 18 | FW | Caü Poanoui | 14 March 1998 (aged 19) | 0 | 0 | (New Caledonian Football Federation) Mont-Dore |
| 19 | FW | Jean-Jacques Katrawa | 2 August 1999 (aged 18) | 0 | 0 | (New Caledonian Football Federation) Païta |
| 20 | MF | Ritchi Iwa | 31 August 1999 (aged 18) | 0 | 0 | (New Caledonian Football Federation) Païta |
| 21 | DF | Jimmy Wélépane | 5 January 1999 (aged 18) | 0 | 0 | (New Caledonian Football Federation) Lössi |
| 22 | MF | Patrick Gohé | 27 March 1997 (aged 20) | 0 | 0 | (New Caledonian Football Federation) Lössi |
| 23 | GK | Rocky Nyikeine | 26 May 1992 (aged 25) | 14 | 0 | (New Caledonian Football Federation) Gaïtcha FCN |

=== Solomon Islands ===
Head coach: (Spain) Felipe Vera-Arango

| No. | Pos. | Player | Date of birth (age) | Caps | Goals | Club |
|---|---|---|---|---|---|---|
| 1 | GK | Desmond Tutu | 29 September 1997 (aged 20) | 0 | 0 | (Solomon Islands Football Federation) Kossa |
| 2 | DF | Hadisi Aengari | 23 October 1988 (aged 29) | 17 | 0 | (Solomon Islands Football Federation) Solomon Warriors |
| 3 | DF | Robert Laua | 8 September 1991 (aged 26) | 7 | 0 | (Solomon Islands Football Federation) Marist |
| 4 | DF | Emmanuel Poila | 16 July 1990 (aged 27) | 11 | 1 | (Solomon Islands Football Federation) Solomon Warriors |
| 6 | DF | Richard Hiromana | 30 November 1996 (aged 21) | 5 | 0 | (Solomon Islands Football Federation) Marist |
| 7 | MF | Clifton Aumae | 25 September 1986 (aged 31) | 3 | 0 | (Solomon Islands Football Federation) Henderson Eels |
| 8 | MF | Atkin Kaua | 4 April 1996 (aged 21) | 9 | 1 | (Solomon Islands Football Federation) Marist |
| 9 | FW | Benjamin Totori | 20 February 1986 (aged 31) | 40 | 19 | (Solomon Islands Football Federation) Western United |
| 10 | MF | Tutizama Tanito | 27 November 1993 (aged 24) | 4 | 1 | (Solomon Islands Football Federation) Henderson Eels |
| 11 | FW | Jerry Donga | 31 January 1991 (aged 26) | 15 | 2 | (Solomon Islands Football Federation) Solomon Warriors |
| 12 | GK | Zantas Kabini | 21 February 1985 (aged 32) | 1 | 0 | (Solomon Islands Football Federation) Marist |
| 13 | FW | Adrian Mara | 1 August 1998 (aged 19) | 0 | 0 | (Solomon Islands Football Federation) Real Kakamora |
| 14 | MF | Jeffery Bule | 15 November 1991 (aged 26) | 14 | 1 | (Solomon Islands Football Federation) Marist |
| 15 | MF | Norman Miniti | 23 February 1992 (aged 25) | 0 | 0 | (Solomon Islands Football Federation) Real Kakamora |
| 16 | DF | Junior Albert | 25 July 1994 (aged 23) | 1 | 0 | (Solomon Islands Football Federation) Henderson Eels |
| 17 | MF | Henry Fa'arodo (c) | 5 October 1982 (aged 35) | 56 | 16 | (Solomon Islands Football Federation) Marist |
| 18 | DF | Boni Pride | 10 September 1995 (aged 22) | 0 | 0 | (Solomon Islands Football Federation) Henderson Eels |
| 20 | FW | Gagame Feni | 21 August 1992 (aged 25) | 13 | 0 | (Solomon Islands Football Federation) Solomon Warriors |

=== Tonga ===
Head coach: Timote Moleni

| No. | Pos. | Player | Date of birth (age) | Caps | Goals | Club |
|---|---|---|---|---|---|---|
| 1 | GK | Mahe Malafu | 24 February 1998 (aged 19) | 1 | 0 | (Tonga Football Association) Veitongo |
| 2 | DF | Sione Uhatahi | 15 September 1988 (aged 29) | 7 | 1 | (Tonga Football Association) Veitongo |
| 3 | DF | Lotima Taufoou (c) | 24 August 1984 (aged 33) | 5 | 0 | |
| 4 | DF | Siuloa Fahina | 1 April 1994 (aged 23) | 1 | 0 | |
| 5 | DF | Ilalio Leakona | 14 January 1981 (aged 36) | 6 | 0 | (Tonga Football Association) Veitongo |
| 6 | DF | Tevita Vakatapu | 2 December 1999 (aged 18) | 1 | 0 | (Tonga Football Association) Veitongo |
| 7 | MF | Vai Lutu | 30 September 1999 (aged 18) | 1 | 0 | (Tonga Football Association) Veitongo |
| 8 | DF | Sione Tu'ifangaloka | 24 April 1999 (aged 18) | 0 | 0 | (Tonga Football Association) Veitongo |
| 9 | FW | Soakai Vea | 19 July 1998 (aged 19) | 4 | 0 | (Tonga Football Association) Marist Prems |
| 10 | FW | Hemaloto Polovili | 27 July 1997 (aged 20) | 4 | 0 | (Tonga Football Association) Veitongo |
| 11 | MF | Aisea Muli | 17 October 1998 (aged 19) | 0 | 0 | |
| 12 | MF | Kilifi Uele | 14 November 1974 (aged 43) | 19 | 1 | (Tonga Football Association) Veitongo |
| 13 | MF | Laulea Taufa | 14 July 1999 (aged 18) | 1 | 0 | |
| 15 | MF | Unaloto Feao | 16 January 1982 (aged 35) | 14 | 6 | |
| 16 | DF | Petuli Tokotaha | 10 September 2000 (aged 17) | 0 | 0 | |
| 17 | FW | Tevita Tukimaka | 15 November 1998 (aged 19) | 1 | 0 | |
| 18 | GK | Semisi Otukolo | 23 June 1999 (aged 18) | 0 | 0 | |

=== Tuvalu ===
Head coach: Taukiei Ituaso

| No. | Pos. | Player | Date of birth (age) | Caps | Goals | Club |
|---|---|---|---|---|---|---|
| 1 | GK | Katepu Sieni | 11 May 1988 (aged 29) | 4 | 0 | (Tuvalu Islands Football Association) Tofaga |
| 2 | DF | Kalamelu Seloto | 24 February 1992 (aged 25) | 1 | 0 | (Tuvalu Islands Football Association) Nauti |
| 3 | DF | Paolo Taitai | 2 September 1996 (aged 21) | 1 | 0 | |
| 4 | DF | Meauke Tuilagi | 5 September 1997 (aged 20) | 1 | 0 | (Tuvalu Islands Football Association) Manu Laeva |
| 5 | DF | Taulau Iotonu | 14 October 1993 (aged 24) | 0 | 0 | |
| 6 | DF | James Lepaio | 6 September 1992 (aged 25) | 6 | 1 | (Tuvalu Islands Football Association) Tofaga |
| 7 | FW | Taufaiva Ionatana (c) | 5 February 1993 (aged 24) | 1 | 1 | (Tuvalu Islands Football Association) Nauti |
| 8 | MF | Jelly Selau | 23 July 1983 (aged 34) | 8 | 0 | (Tuvalu Islands Football Association) Manu Laeva |
| 9 | FW | Alopua Petoa | 24 January 1990 (aged 27) | 6 | 7 | (Tuvalu Islands Football Association) Tofaga |
| 10 | MF | Matti Uaelasi | 14 August 1992 (aged 25) | 1 | 0 | (Tuvalu Islands Football Association) Lakena United |
| 11 | FW | Sueni Founuku | 15 June 1994 (aged 23) | 0 | 0 | (Tuvalu Islands Football Association) Manu Laeva |
| 12 | MF | Toua Tueni | 15 November 1997 (aged 20) | 0 | 0 | |
| 13 | MF | Afelee Valoa | 5 July 1990 (aged 27) | 1 | 0 | (Tuvalu Islands Football Association) Nauti |
| 14 | MF | Akelei Lima'alofa | 13 November 1989 (aged 28) | 3 | 0 | (Tuvalu Islands Football Association) Manu Laeva |
| 15 | FW | Sosene Vailine | 7 March 1993 (aged 24) | 1 | 0 | (Tuvalu Islands Football Association) Nauti |
| 16 | FW | Teoliga Fakailoga | 12 September 1997 (aged 20) | 0 | 0 | (Tuvalu Islands Football Association) Nauti |
| 17 | DF | Laupama Elu | 18 March 1997 (aged 20) | 1 | 0 | |
| 19 | MF | Paulo Lotonu | 20 March 1996 (aged 21) | 1 | 0 | (Tuvalu Islands Football Association) Nauti |
| 23 | DF | Silimai Siaosi | 14 October 1994 (aged 23) | 1 | 0 | |
| 24 | DF | Leiatu Uoli | 6 January 1992 (aged 25) | 0 | 0 | (Tuvalu Islands Football Association) Manu Laeva |
| 25 | MF | Folomanu Kulene | 4 September 1997 (aged 20) | 0 | 0 | (Tuvalu Islands Football Association) Manu Laeva |
| 26 | MF | Tafea İoka | 31 May 1997 (aged 20) | 0 | 0 | |
| 51 | GK | İtaia İoane | 1 July 1995 (aged 22) | 0 | 0 | (Tuvalu Islands Football Association) Manu Laeva |

=== Vanuatu ===
Head coach: Moise Poida

| No. | Pos. | Player | Date of birth (age) | Caps | Goals | Club |
|---|---|---|---|---|---|---|
| 1 | GK | Chikau Mansale | 13 January 1983 (aged 34) | 19 | 0 | (Vanuatu Football Federation) Tupuji Imere |
| 2 | DF | Godshen Donna | 7 June 1997 (aged 20) | 1 | 0 | (Vanuatu Football Federation) Amicale |
| 3 | DF | Joseph Iaruel | 25 January 1998 (aged 19) | 1 | 0 | (Vanuatu Football Federation) Shepherds United |
| 4 | DF | Jason Thomas | 20 January 1997 (aged 20) | 8 | 0 | (Solomon Islands Football Federation) Solomon Warriors |
| 5 | DF | Selwyn Vatu | 13 June 1998 (aged 19) | 1 | 0 | (Vanuatu Football Federation) Shepherds United |
| 6 | MF | John Alick | 25 April 1991 (aged 26) | 2 | 0 | (Solomon Islands Football Federation) Solomon Warriors |
| 7 | MF | Jacky Ruben (c) | 10 November 1996 (aged 21) | 4 | 0 | (Vanuatu Football Federation) Erakor Golden Star |
| 8 | MF | John Well Wohale | 9 July 1997 (aged 20) | 0 | 0 | (Vanuatu Football Federation) Shepherds United |
| 9 | MF | Bong Kalo | 18 January 1997 (aged 20) | 7 | 0 | (Swiss Football Association) Ascona |
| 10 | MF | Ronaldo Wilkins | 30 December 1999 (aged 17) | 1 | 0 | (Vanuatu Football Federation) Shepherds United |
| 11 | FW | Tony Kaltak | 5 September 1996 (aged 21) | 4 | 0 | (Vanuatu Football Federation) Erakor Golden Star |
| 12 | FW | Kensi Tangis | 19 December 1991 (aged 25) | 15 | 2 | (Vanuatu Football Federation) Amicale |
| 13 | MF | Elkington Molivakarua | 3 March 1993 (aged 24) | 2 | 0 | (Vanuatu Football Federation) Tupuji Imere |
| 14 | FW | Alex Saniel | 8 November 1996 (aged 21) | 1 | 0 | (Vanuatu Football Federation) Shepherds United |
| 15 | DF | Michel Kaltak | 12 November 1990 (aged 27) | 15 | 2 | (Vanuatu Football Federation) Erakor Golden Star |
| 16 | DF | Lucien Hinge | 21 March 1992 (aged 25) | 2 | 0 | (Vanuatu Football Federation) Tafea |
| 17 | MF | Jonathan Spokeyjack | 13 November 1998 (aged 19) | 0 | 0 | (Vanuatu Football Federation) Shepherds United |
| 18 | MF | Claude Aru | 25 April 1997 (aged 20) | 0 | 0 | (Vanuatu Football Federation) Shepherds United |
| 19 | FW | Bernard Daniel | 11 August 1992 (aged 25) | 2 | 0 | (Vanuatu Football Federation) Erakor Golden Star |
| 20 | FW | Azariah Soromon | 1 March 1999 (aged 18) | 1 | 0 | (Vanuatu Football Federation) Tupuji Imere |
| 21 | MF | Jayson Timatua | 27 December 1998 (aged 18) | 0 | 0 | (Vanuatu Football Federation) Shepherds United |
| 22 | GK | Dick Taiwia | 28 December 1997 (aged 19) | 0 | 0 | (Vanuatu Football Federation) Ifira Black Bird |
| 23 | GK | Kaloran Firiam | 10 December 1994 (aged 22) | 0 | 0 | (Vanuatu Football Federation) Tafea |
