= New Caledonia national under-23 football team =

New Caledonia U23
- Nickname: Les Cagous (The Kagus)
- Association: New Caledonian Football Federation
- Confederation: OFC (Oceania)
- Head coach: (France) Thierry Sardo
- Captain: Jordan Mandaoue
- FIFA code: NCL
First colours	Second colours

First international
- New Caledonia 2–1 Australia (Nouméa, New Caledonia; 6 November 1967)

Biggest win
- Solomon Islands 0–3 New Caledonia (Port Vila, Vanuatu; 17 June 2015)

Biggest defeat
- New Caledonia 0–5 New Zealand (Port Moresby, Papua New Guinea; 7 July 2015)

The New Caledonia national under-23 football team is the national U-23 team of New Caledonia and is controlled by the New Caledonian Football Federation.

== Competition record ==
=== OFC ===
The OFC Men's Olympic Qualifying Tournament is a tournament held once every four years to decide the only qualification spot for Oceania Football Confederation (OFC) and representatives at the Olympic Games.

OFC Men's Olympic Qualifying Tournament
Year	Round	Pld	W	D	L	GF	GA	GD	Pts
(Fiji) 1992									
(Australia) 1996									
(New Zealand) 1999									
(Australia) 2004									
(Fiji) 2008									
(New Zealand) 2012									
(Papua New Guinea) 2015									
Total	0	0	0	0	0	0	0	0	0

== Current squad ==
The following where called up for the 2017 Pacific Mini Games.

Caps and goals as of 17 June 2015.

No.	Pos.	Player	Date of birth (age)	Caps	Goals	Club
1	GK	Mickaël Ulile	July 16, 1997 (age 29)	0	0	(New Caledonian Football Federation) Magenta
16	GK	Nathanaël Hlemu	August 22, 1998 (age 28)	0	0	(New Caledonian Football Federation) Gaïtcha FCN
23	GK	Patrick Nyikeine	February 25, 1998 (age 28)	0	0	(New Caledonian Football Federation) Gaïtcha FCN
2	DF	Johannes Bernole	May 8, 1998 (age 28)	0	0	(New Caledonian Football Federation) Hienghène Sport
3	DF	Jean-Marc Kaudre	February 7, 1999 (age 27)	0	0	(New Caledonian Football Federation) Païta
5	DF	Dominique Wel	June 16, 1997 (age 29)	0	0	(New Caledonian Football Federation) Métropole
12	DF	Maki Romone	May 28, 1998 (age 28)	0	0	(New Caledonian Football Federation) Wetr
13	DF	Elo Gowé	August 13, 1999 (age 27)	0	0	(New Caledonian Football Federation) Mont-Dore
15	DF	Clarence Nyipie	April 3, 1999 (age 27)	0	0	(New Caledonian Football Federation) Païta
21	DF	Jimmy Wélépane	January 5, 1999 (age 27)	0	0	(New Caledonian Football Federation) Lössi
4	MF	Pothin Poma	February 13, 1997 (age 29)	0	0	(New Caledonian Football Federation) Hienghène Sport
6	MF	Renzo Wéjième	September 9, 1999 (age 27)	0	0	(New Caledonian Football Federation) Magenta
7	MF	Gaétan Gope-Iwate	October 5, 1998 (age 28)	0	0	(New Caledonian Football Federation) Wetr
8	MF	Marino Akapo	October 26, 1999 (age 27)	0	0	(New Caledonian Football Federation) Païta
10	MF	Romaric Luépack	October 5, 1997 (age 29)	0	0	(New Caledonian Football Federation) Wetr
11	MF	Shene Wélépane	December 9, 1997 (age 28)	0	0	(New Caledonian Football Federation) Magenta
20	MF	Ritchi Iwa	August 31, 1999 (age 27)	0	0	(New Caledonian Football Federation) Païta
22	MF	Patrick Gohé	March 27, 1997 (age 29)	0	0	(New Caledonian Football Federation) Lössi
9	FW	Warren Houala	June 26, 1997 (age 29)	0	0	(New Caledonian Football Federation) Hienghène Sport
14	FW	Henri Boucheron	May 20, 1998 (age 28)	0	0	(New Caledonian Football Federation) Magenta
17	FW	Jean Baptiste Waitreü	January 23, 1997 (age 29)	0	0	(New Caledonian Football Federation) Gaïtcha FCN
18	FW	Caü Poanoui	March 14, 1998 (age 28)	0	0	(New Caledonian Football Federation) Mont-Dore
19	FW	Jean Jacques Katrawa	August 2, 1999 (age 27)	0	0	(New Caledonian Football Federation) Païta
