= 2019 OFC Champions League group stage =

The 2019 OFC Champions League group stage was played from 10 February to 2 March 2019. A total of 16 teams competed in the group stage to decide the eight places in the knockout stage of the 2019 OFC Champions League.

== Draw ==
The draw for the group stage was held on 13 November 2018 at the OFC Headquarters in Auckland, New Zealand. The 16 teams (14 teams entering the group stage and two teams advancing from the qualifying stage) were drawn into four groups of four, with the following mechanism:

- The champions of the four host associations (Fiji, New Caledonia, Solomon Islands, Vanuatu) were drawn into Position 1 of Groups A–D.
- The champions of the three remaining developed associations, and the runners-up of New Zealand, by virtue of having the best second team in the 2018 OFC Champions League, were drawn into Position 2 of Groups A–D.
- The runners-up of the six developed associations apart from New Zealand were drawn into Position 3 of Groups A–D and Position 4 of Groups A–B (first team drawn to Groups A–B allocated to Position 3, second team drawn to Groups A–B allocated to Position 4). Teams from the same association could not be drawn into the same group.
- The winners and runners-up of the qualifying stage, whose identity was not known at the time of the draw, were drawn into Position 4 of Groups C–D.

Host teams	Remaining champions & New Zealand runners-up	Remaining runners-up	Teams advancing from qualifying stage
(Fiji) Lautoka; (New Caledonia) Hienghène Sport; (Solomon Islands) Solomon Warriors (Note: The identity of the teams from Solomon Islands was not known at the time of the draw.); (Vanuatu) Erakor Golden Star	(New Zealand) Auckland City; (Papua New Guinea) Toti City; (French Polynesia) Central Sport; (New Zealand) Team Wellington	(Fiji) Ba; (New Caledonia) Magenta; (Papua New Guinea) Morobe Wawens; (Solomon Islands) Henderson Eels; (French Polynesia) Tefana; (Vanuatu) Malampa Revivors	Qualifying stage winners; Qualifying stage runners-up

The following were the winners and runners-up of the qualifying stage which joined the 14 direct entrants in the group stage.

Qualifying stage winners	Qualifying stage runners-up
(Cook Islands) Tupapa Maraerenga	(Samoa) Kiwi

== Format ==
The four teams in each group played each other on a round-robin basis at a centralised venue. The winners and runners-up of each group advanced to the quarter-finals of the knockout stage.

== Schedule ==
Matches were played on the following dates and venues:

- Group A matches were played between 10 and 16 February 2019 in New Caledonia.
- Group B matches were played between 10 and 16 February 2019 in Fiji.
- Group C matches were played between 23 February – 1 March 2019 in Vanuatu.
- Group D matches were played between 24 February – 2 March 2019 in the Solomon Islands.

The schedule of each matchday was as follows.

Matchday	Dates			Matches
Matchday	Groups A & B	Group C	Group D	Matches
Matchday 1	10 February 2019	23 February 2019	24 February 2019	Team 2 vs. Team 3, Team 4 vs. Team 1
Matchday 2	13 February 2019	26 February 2019	27 February 2019	Team 4 vs. Team 2, Team 1 vs. Team 3
Matchday 3	16 February 2019	1 March 2019	2 March 2019	Team 3 vs. Team 4, Team 1 vs. Team 2

== Groups ==
=== Group A ===
All times were local, NCT (UTC+11).

Pos	Team	Pld	W	D	L	GF	GA	GD	Pts	Qualification	HIE	TOT	TEF	MAL
1	(New Caledonia) Hienghène Sport (H)	3	2	1	0	7	1	+6	7	Knockout stage	—	1–1	1–0	—
2	(Papua New Guinea) Toti City	3	1	2	0	8	6	+2	5	Knockout stage	—	—	3–3	—
3	(French Polynesia) Tefana	3	0	2	1	6	7	−1	2		—	—	—	3–3
4	(Vanuatu) Malampa Revivors	3	0	1	2	5	12	−7	1		0–5	2–4	—	—

Source: OFC
(H) Hosts
10 February 2019
14:00

Toti City (Papua New Guinea)	3–3	(French Polynesia) Tefana
Dabinyaba 52', 60'; Gunemba 81'	Report	Tuteina 1'; Mathon 33'; A. Tehau 53'

Stade Yoshida, Koné
Attendance: 200
Referee: George Time (Solomon Islands)
10 February 2019
17:00

Malampa Revivors (Vanuatu)	0–5	(New Caledonia) Hienghène Sport
	Report	B. Kaï 50' (pen.), 54', 89'; A. Kaï 57'; Gorendiawé 90'

Stade Yoshida, Koné
Attendance: 1,230
Referee: Campbell-Kirk Waugh (New Zealand)

13 February 2019
14:00

Malampa Revivors (Vanuatu)	2–4	(Papua New Guinea) Toti City
Molivakarua 5'; Batick 82'	Report	Gunemba 42', 44', 45'; Dabinyaba 60'

Stade Yoshida, Koné
Attendance: 100
Referee: Sione Mau (American Samoa)
13 February 2019
17:00

Hienghène Sport (New Caledonia)	1–0	(French Polynesia) Tefana
Krissian 4' (o.g.)	Report

Stade Yoshida, Koné
Attendance: 1,368
Referee: Matthew Conger (New Zealand)

16 February 2019
14:00

Tefana (French Polynesia)	3–3	(Vanuatu) Malampa Revivors
Tiaiho 23' (pen.), 65'; Krissian 40'	Report	Aru 7'; Batick 26', 74'

Stade Yoshida, Koné
Attendance: 300
Referee: Salesh Chand (Fiji)
16 February 2019
17:00

Hienghène Sport (New Caledonia)	1–1	(Papua New Guinea) Toti City
Dahite 9'	Report	Dabinyaba 24'

Stade Yoshida, Koné
Attendance: 1,336
Referee: Matthew Conger (New Zealand)

=== Group B ===
All times were local, FJT (UTC+12).

Pos	Team	Pld	W	D	L	GF	GA	GD	Pts	Qualification	CEN	HEN	LAU	MOR
1	(French Polynesia) Central Sport	3	2	1	0	12	4	+8	7	Knockout stage	—	3–2	—	—
2	(Solomon Islands) Henderson Eels	3	2	0	1	15	8	+7	6	Knockout stage	—	—	—	7–0
3	(Fiji) Lautoka (H)	3	1	1	1	12	8	+4	4		2–2	5–6	—	—
4	(Papua New Guinea) Morobe Wawens	3	0	0	3	0	19	−19	0		0–7	—	0–5	—

Source: OFC
(H) Hosts
10 February 2019
13:00

Central Sport (French Polynesia)	3–2	(Solomon Islands) Henderson Eels
Graglia 11'; Tissot 28'; L. Tehau 79'	Report	Laeta 85'; Tanito 90' (pen.)

Churchill Park, Lautoka
Attendance: 1,000
Referee: Calvin Berg (New Zealand)
10 February 2019
16:00

Morobe Wawens (Papua New Guinea)	0–5	(Fiji) Lautoka
	Report	Sahib 11' (pen.), 62'; Totori 43'; Rawaqa 88'; Drudru 90+2'

Churchill Park, Lautoka
Attendance: 1,900
Referee: Nick Waldron (New Zealand)

13 February 2019
13:00

Morobe Wawens (Papua New Guinea)	0–7	(French Polynesia) Central Sport
	Report	Graglia 8', 39', 42', 73'; L. Tehau 19', 58'; Tissot 44'

Churchill Park, Lautoka
Attendance: 150
Referee: Antony Riley (New Zealand)
13 February 2019
16:00

Lautoka (Fiji)	5–6	(Solomon Islands) Henderson Eels
Kalo 24'; Vakatalesau 43'; Tutu 45+2' (o.g.); Drudru 59'; Sivoki 64'	Report	Felani 5'; Allan 28' (o.g.); Laeta 30'; Nawo 34', 90+4'; Baegeni 90+2'

Churchill Park, Lautoka
Attendance: 700
Referee: Joel Hopkken (Vanuatu)

16 February 2019
13:00

Henderson Eels (Solomon Islands)	7–0	(Papua New Guinea) Morobe Wawens
Tanito 61', 90+5' (pen.); Nawo 68'; Ofea 70'; Suri 86', 88'; Raramane 90+3'	Report

Churchill Park, Lautoka
Attendance: 300
Referee: Sione Lelenga (Tonga)
16 February 2019
16:00

Lautoka (Fiji)	2–2	(French Polynesia) Central Sport
Babka 19' (o.g.); Totori 39'	Report	Castillo 12'; Hauata 60'

Churchill Park, Lautoka
Attendance: 700
Referee: Nick Waldron (New Zealand)

=== Group C ===
All times were local, VUT (UTC+11).

Pos	Team	Pld	W	D	L	GF	GA	GD	Pts	Qualification	WEL	BAF	ERA	KIW
1	(New Zealand) Team Wellington	3	3	0	0	18	0	+18	9	Knockout stage	—	2–0	—	—
2	(Fiji) Ba	3	1	1	1	6	4	+2	4	Knockout stage	—	—	—	5–1
3	(Vanuatu) Erakor Golden Star (H)	3	1	1	1	3	4	−1	4		0–3	1–1	—	—
4	(Samoa) Kiwi	3	0	0	3	1	20	−19	0		0–13	—	0–2	—

Source: OFC
(H) Hosts
23 February 2019
14:00

Team Wellington (New Zealand)	2–0	(Fiji) Ba
Clapham 9'; Allen 17'	Report

Korman Stadium, Port Vila
Attendance: 3,000
Referee: Norbert Hauata (Tahiti)
23 February 2019
17:00

Kiwi (Samoa)	0–2	(Vanuatu) Erakor Golden Star
	Report	Pepeta 58'; Ruben 71'

Korman Stadium, Port Vila
Attendance: 4,000
Referee: George Time (Solomon Islands)

26 February 2019
14:00

Kiwi (Samoa)	0–13	(New Zealand) Team Wellington
	Report	Hailemariam 8', 12', 41'; Allen 26', 28', 59', 61', 64', 84'; Cameron 29'; Stevens 68'; Mulholland 83', 90+1'

Korman Stadium, Port Vila
Attendance: 3,000
Referee: Roger Adams (Papua New Guinea)
26 February 2019
17:00

Erakor Golden Star (Vanuatu)	1–1	(Fiji) Ba
Kaltack 45+1'	Report	Suwamy 81'

Korman Stadium, Port Vila
Attendance: 4,000
Referee: Hamilton Siau (Solomon Islands)

1 March 2019
14:00

Ba (Fiji)	5–1	(Samoa) Kiwi
Tiwa 1'; Cavuilagi 10'; Zahid 18', 90+4'; Kakasi 71'	Report	Mano 45+1'

Korman Stadium, Port Vila
Attendance: 1,000
Referee: Ben Aukwai (Solomon Islands)
1 March 2019
17:00

Erakor Golden Star (Vanuatu)	0–3	(New Zealand) Team Wellington
	Report	Sinclair 56', 71'; Allen 87'

Korman Stadium, Port Vila
Attendance: 4,000
Referee: Norbert Hauata (Tahiti)

=== Group D ===
All times were local, SBT (UTC+11).

Pos	Team	Pld	W	D	L	GF	GA	GD	Pts	Qualification	AUC	MAG	SWA	TUP
1	(New Zealand) Auckland City	3	3	0	0	23	1	+22	9	Knockout stage	—	2–1	—	—
2	(New Caledonia) Magenta	3	2	0	1	14	3	+11	6	Knockout stage	—	—	—	10–1
3	(Solomon Islands) Solomon Warriors (H)	3	1	0	2	10	10	0	3		0–6	0–3	—	—
4	(Cook Islands) Tupapa Maraerenga	3	0	0	3	2	35	−33	0		0–15	—	1–10	—

Source: OFC
(H) Hosts
24 February 2019
13:00

Auckland City (New Zealand)	2–1	(New Caledonia) Magenta
Morgan 4'; Lea'alafa 31'	Report	Sele 90+3'

Lawson Tama Stadium, Honiara
Attendance: 10,900
Referee: David Yareboinen (Papua New Guinea)
24 February 2019
16:00

Tupapa Maraerenga (Cook Islands)	1–10	(Solomon Islands) Solomon Warriors
Harmon 84'	Report	Alick 9'; Tangis 19', 52'; Baringer-Tahiri 34' (o.g.); Hou 36'; Tigi 39'; Donga 53'; Masae 70'; Samani 90'; Peter 90+1'

Lawson Tama Stadium, Honiara
Attendance: 11,000
Referee: Sione Lelenga (Tonga)

27 February 2019
13:00

Tupapa Maraerenga (Cook Islands)	0–15	(New Zealand) Auckland City
	Report	Guardiola 20', 40', 57'; Tavano 28', 63', 85'; Browne 53', 82'; Lea'alafa 62', 84'; Bonsu-Maro 65', 68', 73', 90+1'; Morgan 72'

Lawson Tama Stadium, Honiara
Attendance: 2,500
Referee: Sione Mau (American Samoa)
27 February 2019
16:00

Solomon Warriors (Solomon Islands)	0–3	(New Caledonia) Magenta
	Report	Sele 32', 45+4' (pen.); Hmaen 90+5'

Lawson Tama Stadium, Honiara
Attendance: 4,000
Referee: Joel Hopkken (Vanuatu)

2 March 2019
13:00

Magenta (New Caledonia)	10–1	(Cook Islands) Tupapa Maraerenga
Hnautra 5', 26', 50', 60'; Wahnawe 10', 32'; Wélépane 40'; Ounei 45+3'; Nemia 73', 85'	Report	Edwards 67'

Lawson Tama Stadium, Honiara
Attendance: 4,000
Referee: Sione Lelenga (Tonga)
2 March 2019
16:00

Solomon Warriors (Solomon Islands)	0–6	(New Zealand) Auckland City
	Report	Manickum 15', 26'; Browne 29'; Tavano 37'; Lea'alafa 90' (pen.); Hudson-Wihongi 90+2'

Lawson Tama Stadium, Honiara
Attendance: 9,000
Referee: David Yareboinen (Papua New Guinea)
