= 2019 OFC Champions League final =

- Event: 2019 OFC Champions League
Magenta	Hienghène Sport
(New Caledonia)	(New Caledonia)
0	1
- Date: 11 May 2019
- Venue: Stade Numa-Daly Magenta, Nouméa
- Referee: Matthew Conger (New Zealand)
- Attendance: 7,000

The 2019 OFC Champions League final was the final match of the 2019 OFC Champions League, the 18th edition of the Oceanian Club Championship, Oceania's premier club football tournament organized by the Oceania Football Confederation (OFC), and the 13th season under the current OFC Champions League name.

The final was contested as a single match between New Caledonian teams Magenta and Hienghène Sport. The match took place at the Stade Numa-Daly Magenta in Nouméa on 11 May 2019.

Hienghène Sport won the final 1–0 for their first OFC Champions League title.

== Teams ==
In the following table, finals until 2006 were in the Oceania Club Championship era, since 2007 were in the OFC Champions League era.

Team	Previous finals appearances (bold indicates winners)
(New Caledonia) Magenta	1 (2005)
(New Caledonia) Hienghène Sport	None

The final was the first all-New Caledonian final, and guaranteed that for the first time that the OFC club champions were from New Caledonia. This was also the first final since 2005 not to feature a team from New Zealand, and the first ever not to feature any team from New Zealand or Australia (which left the OFC after 2005).

== Venue ==
The Stade Numa-Daly Magenta was the venue for the final. This was the first time that the stadium hosted an OFC Champions League final.

== Road to the final ==
Note: In all results below, the score of the finalist is given first (H: home; A: away; N: neutral).

(New Caledonia) Magenta		Round	(New Caledonia) Hienghène Sport	
Opponent	Result	Group stage	Opponent	Result
(New Zealand) Auckland City	1–2 (N)	Matchday 1	(Vanuatu) Malampa Revivors	5–0 (H)
(Solomon Islands) Solomon Warriors	3–0 (A)	Matchday 2	(French Polynesia) Tefana	1–0 (H)
(Cook Islands) Tupapa Maraerenga	10–1 (N)	Matchday 3	(Papua New Guinea) Toti City	1–1 (H)
**Group D runners-up**: Pos / Team / Pld / Pts; 1 / (New Zealand) Auckland City / 3 / **9**; **2** / (New Caledonia) Magenta / **3** / **6**; 3 / (Solomon Islands) Solomon Warriors (H) / 3 / **3**; 4 / (Cook Islands) Tupapa Maraerenga / 3 / **0**; Source: OFC (H) Hosts		Final standings	**Group A winners**: Pos / Team / Pld / Pts; **1** / (New Caledonia) Hienghène Sport (H) / **3** / **7**; 2 / (Papua New Guinea) Toti City / 3 / **5**; 3 / (French Polynesia) Tefana / 3 / **2**; 4 / (Vanuatu) Malampa Revivors / 3 / **1**; Source: OFC (H) Hosts	
Opponent	Result	Knockout stage	Opponent	Result
(French Polynesia) Central Sport	8–0 (A)	Quarter-finals	(Fiji) Ba	2–1 (a.e.t.) (H)
(New Zealand) Auckland City	2–1 (H)	Semi-finals	(New Zealand) Team Wellington	2–0 (H)

== Format ==
In the final, the two semi-final winners played each other, with the host team decided by draw, which was held on 5 March 2019 at the OFC Headquarters in Auckland, New Zealand. Based on the draw, Magenta (winner of semi-final 2) were the home team.

If the match was level at the end of 90 minutes of normal playing time, extra time would be played (two periods of 15 minutes each), where each team would be allowed to make a fourth substitution. If still tied after extra time, the match would be decided by a penalty shoot-out to determine the winners.

== Match ==
=== Details ===
11 May 2019
17:00 UTC+11

Magenta (New Caledonia)	0–1	(New Caledonia) Hienghène Sport
	Report	Roine 66'

Stade Numa-Daly Magenta, Nouméa
Attendance: 7,000
Referee: Matthew Conger (New Zealand)

**Magenta**	**Hienghène Sport**

GK	1	(New Caledonia) Steve Ixoée
RB	7	(New Caledonia) Kevin Maitran
CB	4	(New Caledonia) Gaétan Gope-Iwate	(yellow card) 90+5'
CB	5	(New Caledonia) Mickael Tiaou	(yellow card) 90+5' (yellow-red card) 90+5'
LB	3	(New Caledonia) Jean-Brice Wadriako (c)
CM	21	(New Caledonia) Wilsen Poameno		(substituted off) 80'
CM	15	(New Caledonia) Didier Simane
AM	10	(New Caledonia) Richard Sele
RF	2	(New Caledonia) Jean-Christ Wajoka
CF	8	(New Caledonia) Nathanaël Hmaen
LF	11	(New Caledonia) Kevin Nemia	(yellow card) 27'
Substitutes:
GK	16	(New Caledonia) Nicodem Hmaen
DF	13	(New Caledonia) Jean-Marie Hmaloko
DF	14	(New Caledonia) Jean-Claude Jewine
MF	12	(New Caledonia) Shene Wélépane
MF	17	(New Caledonia) Yorick Hnautra
FW	9	(New Caledonia) Emile Ounei
FW	18	(New Caledonia) Leon Wahnawe		(substituted on) 80'
Manager:
(France) Alain Moizan

GK	1	(New Caledonia) Rocky Nyikeine
RB	3	(New Caledonia) William Yentao		(substituted off) 74'
CB	13	(New Caledonia) Roy Kayara
CB	5	(New Caledonia) Jordan Dinet	(yellow card) 39'
LB	26	(New Caledonia) Erwan Ausu
CM	20	(New Caledonia) Cédric Sansot
CM	8	(New Caledonia) Geordy Gony
AM	10	(New Caledonia) Miguel Kayara		(substituted off) 84'
RW	7	(New Caledonia) Anthony Kaï		(substituted off) 60'
CF	11	(New Caledonia) Bertrand Kaï (c)
LW	9	(New Caledonia) Brice Dahité
Substitutes:
GK	19	(New Caledonia) Jacques Nyikeine
DF	2	(New Caledonia) Joris Gorendiawé
DF	4	(New Caledonia) Bruno Hyanem		(substituted on) 74'
FW	12	(New Caledonia) Antoine Roine		(substituted on) 60'
FW	23	(New Caledonia) Nelson Kaï
FW	28	(New Caledonia) Franck Sinem
FW	30	(New Caledonia) Yvanoe Bamy		(substituted on) 84'
Manager:
(French Polynesia) Félix Tagawa

Assistant referees:
Tevita Makasini (Tonga)
Mark Ruke (New Zealand)
Fourth official:
Campbell-Kirk Waugh (New Zealand)

**Match rules**

- 90 minutes.
- 30 minutes of extra time if scores level.
- Penalty shoot-out if scores still level.
- Maximum of three substitutions, with a fourth allowed in extra time.
