= 2017–18 Tahiti Ligue 1 =

Tahiti Ligue 1
- Season: 2017–18
- Champions: Central Sport
- Relegated: Punaruu, Aorai
- Matches: 135
- Goals: 803 (5.95 per match)
- Top goalscorer: (French Polynesia) Teaonui Tehau (53 goals)
- Biggest home win: Taiarapu 11-2 Aorai (23 February 2018)
- Biggest away win: Punaruu 1-19 Vénus (20 April 2018)
- Highest scoring: Punaruu 1-19 Vénus (20 April 2018)

The 2017–18 Tahiti Ligue 1 is the 71st season of top-flight football in Tahiti. Tefana are the defending champions having won their fifth title last season. The season started on 15 September 2017 and finished on 19 May 2018.

== Standings ==
Pos	Team	Pld	W	D	L	GF	GA	GD	Pts	Qualification or relegation
1	AS Central Sport	27	22	3	2	107	40	+67	96	Qualification to 2019 OFC Champions League
2	AS Tefana	27	20	4	3	100	45	+55	91	Qualification to 2019 OFC Champions League
3	AS Dragon	27	19	5	3	112	41	+71	89	
4	AS Pirae	27	14	4	9	104	64	+40	73	
5	AS Vénus	27	13	4	10	101	52	+49	70	
6	AS Taiarapu	27	12	5	10	99	67	+32	68	
7	AS Manu-Ura	27	11	1	15	70	74	−4	61	
8	Tahiti U-19	27	3	3	21	51	125	−74	39	
9	AS Aorai	27	4	1	22	33	135	−102	38 (Note: Points deducted: AS Aorai: 2 pts; AS Tamarii Punaruu 3 pts)	Relegation to 2018-19 Tahiti Ligue 2
10	AS Tamarii Punaruu	27	1	2	24	26	160	−134	29	Relegation to 2018-19 Tahiti Ligue 2

Source: FIFA
Rules for classification: 4 points for a win, 2 points for a draw, 1 point for a defeat.

== Top scorers ==
- Teaonui Tehau record all-time top goalscorer in single season with 53 goals.

Rank	Player	Club	Goals
1	(French Polynesia) Teaonui Tehau	Vénus	53
2	(French Polynesia) Yohann Tihoni	Taiarapu	48
3	(French Polynesia) Tamatoa Tetauira	Dragon	35
4	(French Polynesia) Tearii Labaste	Pirae	28
5	(French Polynesia) Sandro Tau	Pirae	25
6	(France) Benoit Mathon	Tefana	23
6	(French Polynesia) Francois Mu	Manu-Ura	23
8	(French Polynesia) Sylvain Graglia	Central Sport	22
8	(French Polynesia) Rainui Tze-Yu	Dragon	22
10	(French Polynesia) Gary Rochette	Manu-Ura	18

== Multiple hat-tricks ==
- It was season with 52 multiple hat-tricks.
- Teaonui Tehau record all-time of most multiple hat-tricks in a single season with 10 multiple hat-tricks.

#	Player	For	Against	Score	Date	Round
1	(French Polynesia) Tamatoa Tetauira (1)	Dragon	Tahiti U19	3-8	16 September 2017	1
2	(French Polynesia) Jay Warren^{4} (1)	Central	Punaruu	7-1	16 September 2017	1
3	(French Polynesia) Yann Vivi (1)	Tahiti U19	Punaruu	0-4	22 September 2017	2
4	(French Polynesia) Teaonui Tehau^{6} (1)	Venus	Aorai	1-6	23 September 2017	2
5	(French Polynesia) Sylvain Graglia (1)	Central	Aorai	1-5	7 October 2017	3
6	(French Polynesia) Teaonui Tehau (2)	Venus	Punaruu	5-1	9 November 2017	6
7	(French Polynesia) Jason P Papaura (1)	Taiarapu	Tahiti U19	1-8	3 November 2017	6
8	(French Polynesia) Tearii C Labaste (1)	Pirae	Taiarapu	4-3	17 November 2017	7
9	(French Polynesia) Yohann Tihoni^{5} (1)	Taiarapu	Punaruu	10-0	24 November 2017	8
10	(French Polynesia) Tamatoa Tetauira (2)	Dragon	Manu Ura	7-3	25 November 2017	8
11	(French Polynesia) Rainui Alexis Tze-Yu (1)	Dragon	Manu Ura	7-3	25 November 2017	8
12	(French Polynesia) Alvin Tehau	Tefana	Aorai	8-0	9 December 2017	10
13	(French Polynesia) Tamatoa Tetauira^{4} (3)	Dragon	Tahiti U19	8-0	9 December 2017	10
14	(French Polynesia) Tearii C Labaste (2)	Pirae	Venus	5-2	9 December 2017	10
15	(French Polynesia) Teaonui Tehau (3)	Venus	Aorai	4-1	16 December 2017	11
16	(French Polynesia) Tearii C Labaste (3)	Pirae	Manu Ura	8-1	16 December 2017	11
17	(French Polynesia) Yann Vivi^{5} (2)	Tahiti U19	Punaruu	10-0	15 December 2017	11
18	(French Polynesia) Ramanui Amau	Tahiti U19	Punaruu	10-0	15 December 2017	11
19	(French Polynesia) Teaonui Tehau (4)	Venus	Tahiti U19	1-7	21 December 2017	12
20	(French Polynesia) Sylvain Graglia^{4} (2)	Central	Aorai	6-0	21 December 2017	12
21	(French Polynesia) Teaonui Tehau (5)	Venus	Dragon	3-2	19 January 2018	14
22	(French Polynesia) Francois Mu (1)	Manu Ura	Aorai	5-2	19 January 2018	14
23	(France) Benoit Mathon^{4} (1)	Tefana	Punaruu	7-1	20 January 2018	14
24	(French Polynesia) Teaonui Tehau^{4} (6)	Venus	Punaruu	9-2	26 January 2018	15
25	(French Polynesia) Yohann Tihoni (2)	Taiarapu	Punaruu	2-5	2 March 2018	17
26	(French Polynesia) Sandro Tau (1)	Pirae	Aorai	2-13	10 February 2018	17
27	(French Polynesia) Gervais Chan Kat	Pirae	Aorai	2-13	10 February 2018	17
28	(French Polynesia) Heirauari Salem	Pirae	Aorai	2-13	10 February 2018	17
29	(France) Benoit Mathon^{4} (2)	Tefana	Tahiti U19	8-3	10 February 2018	17
30	(French Polynesia) Jason P Papaura^{4} (2)	Taiarapu	Aorai	11-2	23 February 2018	18
31	(French Polynesia) Timiona Parker	Taiarapu	Aorai	11-2	23 February 2018	18
32	(French Polynesia) Francois Mu (2)	Manu Ura	Taiarapu	0-5	9 March 2018	19
33	(French Polynesia) Tamatoa Tetauira^{4} (4)	Dragon	Tahiti U19	2-7	9 March 2018	19
34	(France) Benoit Mathon (3)	Tefana	Aorai	0-4	9 March 2018	19
35	(French Polynesia) Francois Mu (3)	Manu Ura	Pirae	3-1	3 April 2018	20
36	(French Polynesia) Teaonui Tehau^{4} (7)	Venus	Aorai	0-9	3 April 2018	20
37	(France) Benoit Mathon (4)	Tefana	Central	3-2	4 March 2018	20
38	(French Polynesia) Teaonui Tehau^{4} (8)	Venus	Tahiti U19	6-1	11 April 2018	21
39	(French Polynesia) Jess Horoi	Central	Aorai	2-12	11 April 2018	21
40	(French Polynesia) Jay Warren^{4} (2)	Central	Pirae	6-4	29 March 2018	22
41	(French Polynesia) Salomon Teuepauhu^{4}	Dragon	Punaruu	9-2	29 March 2018	22
42	(French Polynesia) Yohann Tihoni (3)	Taiarapu	Central	3-4	15 April 2018	23
43	(French Polynesia) Yohann Tihoni^{5} (4)	Taiarapu	Tahiti U19	9-2	20 April 2018	24
44	(French Polynesia) Teaonui Tehau^{7} (9)	Venus	Punaruu	1-19	20 April 2018	24
45	(French Polynesia) Raiamanu Tetauira	Venus	Punaruu	1-19	20 April 2028	24
46	(French Polynesia) Yann Pennequin-Le Bras	Venus	Punaruu	1-19	20 April 2018	24
47	(French Polynesia) Rainui Alexis Tze-Yu (2)	Dragon	Aorai	5-0	20 April 2018	24
48	(French Polynesia) Yohann Tihoni^{7} (5)	Taiarapu	Punaruu	1-9	5 May 2018	26
49	(France) Benoit Mathon (5)	Tefana	Tahiti U19	7-1	5 May 2018	26
50	(French Polynesia) Sandro Tau (2)	Pirae	Punaruu	9-1	18 May 2018	27
51	(French Polynesia) Teaonui Tehau (10)	Venus	Manu Ura	2-5	18 May 2018	27
52	(French Polynesia) Yohann Tihoni (6)	Taiarapu	Aorai	3-5	19 May 2018	27

- ^{4} Player scored 4 goals
- ^{5} Player scored 5 goals
- ^{6} Player scored 6 goals
- ^{7} Player scored 7 goals

== See also ==
- 2017–18 Tahiti Cup
