= 2019 OFC Champions League knockout stage =

The 2019 OFC Champions League knockout stage was played from 6 April to 12 May 2019. A total of eight teams competed in the knockout stage to decide the champions of the 2019 OFC Champions League.

== Qualified teams ==
The winners and runners-up of each of the four groups in the group stage advanced to the quarter-finals.

Group	Winners	Runners-up
A	(New Caledonia) Hienghène Sport	(Papua New Guinea) Toti City
B	(French Polynesia) Central Sport	(Solomon Islands) Henderson Eels
C	(New Zealand) Team Wellington	(Fiji) Ba
D	(New Zealand) Auckland City	(New Caledonia) Magenta

== Format ==
The eight teams in the knockout stage played on a single-elimination basis, with each tie played as a single match.

== Schedule ==
The schedule of each round was as follows.

Round	Match dates
Quarter-finals	6–7 April 2019
Semi-finals	28 April 2019
Final	11 May 2019

== Bracket ==
The bracket was determined as follows:

Round	Matchups
Quarter-finals	(Group winners host match, matchups decided by draw, teams from same group cannot play each other): QF1; QF2; QF3; QF4
Semi-finals	(Matchups and host team decided by draw, involving winners QF1, QF2, QF3, QF4): SF1; SF2
Final	(Host team decided by draw): Winner SF1 vs. Winner SF2

The bracket was decided after the draw for the knockout stage (quarter-finals, semi-finals, and final), which was held on 5 March 2019 at the OFC Headquarters in Auckland, New Zealand.

Quarter-finals
(French Polynesia) Central Sport	0
(New Caledonia) Magenta	8
(New Zealand) Auckland City	4
(Papua New Guinea) Toti City	1
(New Caledonia) Hienghène Sport (a.e.t.)	2
(Fiji) Ba	1
(New Zealand) Team Wellington	6
(Solomon Islands) Henderson Eels	1

Semi-finals
(New Caledonia) Magenta	2
(New Zealand) Auckland City	1
(New Caledonia) Hienghène Sport	2
(New Zealand) Team Wellington	0

Final
(New Caledonia) Magenta	0
(New Caledonia) Hienghène Sport	1

== Quarter-finals ==
In the quarter-finals, the winners of one group played the runners-up of another group (teams from same group could not play each other), with the group winners hosting the match, and the matchups decided by draw. The quarter-finals were played between 6–7 April 2019.

Team 1	Score	Team 2
Central Sport (French Polynesia)	0–8	(New Caledonia) Magenta
Auckland City (New Zealand)	4–0	(Papua New Guinea) Toti City
Hienghène Sport (New Caledonia)	2–1 (a.e.t.)	(Fiji) Ba
Team Wellington (New Zealand)	6–1	(Solomon Islands) Henderson Eels

7 April 2019
19:00 UTC−10

Central Sport (French Polynesia)	0–8	(New Caledonia) Magenta
	Report	Sele 20'; Hmaen 23', 59'; Tiaou 64'; Hnautra 66'; Nemia 72', 75', 90'

Stade Pater, Pirae
Attendance: 3,000
Referee: Matthew Conger (New Zealand)

6 April 2019
14:00 UTC+13

Auckland City (New Zealand)	4–0	(Papua New Guinea) Toti City
Browne 41', 46', 87'; Hudson-Wihongi 78'	Report

Kiwitea Street, Auckland
Attendance: 500
Referee: Médéric Lacour (New Caledonia)

6 April 2019
17:00 UTC+11

Hienghène Sport (New Caledonia)	2–1 (a.e.t.)	(Fiji) Ba
B. Kaï 45' (pen.); Gony 92'	Report	Rakula 9'

Stade Yoshida, Koné
Attendance: 1,000
Referee: Campbell-Kirk Waugh (New Zealand)

7 April 2019
14:00 UTC+12

Team Wellington (New Zealand)	6–1	(Solomon Islands) Henderson Eels
Allen 18', 56', 59'; Kilkolly 29'; Sinclair 46', 71'	Report	Tanito 43' (pen.)

David Farrington Park, Wellington
Attendance: 300
Referee: Norbert Hauata (Tahiti)

== Semi-finals ==
In the semi-finals, the four quarter-final winners played in two ties, with the matchups and host teams decided by draw. The semi-finals were played on 28 April 2019.

Team 1	Score	Team 2
Hienghène Sport (New Caledonia)	2–0	(New Zealand) Team Wellington
Magenta (New Caledonia)	2–1	(New Zealand) Auckland City

28 April 2019
14:00 UTC+11

Hienghène Sport (New Caledonia)	2–0	(New Zealand) Team Wellington
Gony 48'; Dahite 90+2'	Report

Stade Numa-Daly Magenta, Nouméa
Attendance: 3,000
Referee: George Time (Solomon Islands)

28 April 2019
17:30 UTC+11

Magenta (New Caledonia)	2–1	(New Zealand) Auckland City
Nemia 45+4'; Maitran 89'	Report	Lea'alafa 41'

Stade Numa-Daly Magenta, Nouméa
Attendance: 3,500
Referee: David Yareboinen (Papua New Guinea)

== Final ==
In the final, the two semi-final winners played each other, with the host team decided by draw. The final was played on 11 May 2019.

11 May 2019
17:00 UTC+11

Magenta (New Caledonia)	0–1	(New Caledonia) Hienghène Sport
	Report	Roine 66'

Stade Numa-Daly Magenta, Nouméa
Attendance: 7,000
Referee: Matthew Conger (New Zealand)
