= 2019 OFC Champions League =

Tournament details
- Host countries: Qualifying stage: Cook Islands; Group stage: Vanuatu; Fiji; Solomon Islands; New Caledonia
- Dates: Qualifying stage: 26 January – 1 February 2019; Competition proper: 10 February – 11 May 2019
- Teams: Competition proper: 16; Total: 18 (from 11 associations)

Final positions
- Champions: (New Caledonia) Hienghène Sport (1st title)
- Runners-up: (New Caledonia) Magenta

Tournament statistics
- Matches played: 37
- Goals scored: 206 (5.57 per match)
- Attendance: 88,884 (2,402 per match)
- Top scorer: (England) Ross Allen (11 goals)
- Best player: (New Caledonia) Bertrand Kaï
- Best goalkeeper: (New Caledonia) Rocky Nyikeine
- Fair play award: (New Zealand) Auckland City

The 2019 OFC Champions League was the 18th edition of the Oceanian Club Championship, Oceania's premier club football tournament organized by the Oceania Football Confederation (OFC), and the 13th season under the current OFC Champions League name.

In the final, Hienghène Sport defeated Magenta 1–0, becoming the first team from New Caledonia to win the tournament. As the winners of the 2019 OFC Champions League, they qualified for the 2019 FIFA Club World Cup in Qatar. Team Wellington were the defending champions, but were eliminated by Hienghène Sport in the semi-finals.

== Teams ==
Location of teams of the 2019 OFC Champions League.
Teams entering the group stage; (H) Group stage host
Teams entering the qualifying stage; (h) Qualifying stage host

A total of 18 teams from all 11 OFC member associations entered the competition.

- The seven developed associations (Fiji, New Caledonia, New Zealand, Papua New Guinea, Solomon Islands, Tahiti, Vanuatu) are awarded two berths each in the group stage.
- The four developing associations (American Samoa, Cook Islands, Samoa, Tonga) are awarded one berth each in the qualifying stage, with the winners and runners-up advancing to the group stage.

Teams entering the group stage
Association	Team	Qualifying method
Fiji	Lautoka	2018 Fiji Premier League champions
Fiji	Ba	2018 Fiji Premier League runners-up
New Caledonia	Hienghène Sport	2017 New Caledonia Super Ligue champions
New Caledonia	Magenta	2017 New Caledonia Super Ligue runners-up
New Zealand	Auckland City	2017–18 New Zealand Football Championship finals series champions 2017–18 New Zealand Football Championship regular season premiers
New Zealand	Team Wellington	2017–18 New Zealand Football Championship regular season runners-up
Papua New Guinea	Toti City	2018 Papua New Guinea National Soccer League playoffs champions 2018 Papua New Guinea National Soccer League regular season premiers
Papua New Guinea	Morobe Wawens	2018 Papua New Guinea National Soccer League regular season runners-up
Solomon Islands	Solomon Warriors	2018 Solomon Islands S-League champions
Solomon Islands	Henderson Eels	2018 Solomon Islands S-League runners-up
Tahiti	Central Sport	2017–18 Tahiti Ligue 1 champions
Tahiti	Tefana	2017–18 Tahiti Ligue 1 runners-up
Vanuatu	Erakor Golden Star	2018 VFF National Super League grand final champions
Vanuatu	Malampa Revivors	2018 VFF National Super League grand final runners-up

Teams entering the qualifying stage
Association	Team	Qualifying method
American Samoa	Pago Youth	2017 FFAS Senior League champions
Cook Islands	Tupapa Maraerenga	2018 Cook Islands Round Cup champions
Samoa	Kiwi	2018 Samoa National League champions
Tonga	Lotohaʻapai United	2018 Tonga Major League champions

== Schedule ==
The schedule of the competition was as follows. For this season, all ties in the knockout stage were played as a single match.

Stage	Draw date	Match dates
Qualifying stage	13 November 2018 (Auckland, New Zealand)	26 January – 1 February 2019 (Cook Islands)
Group stage	13 November 2018 (Auckland, New Zealand)	Group A: 10–16 February 2019 (New Caledonia); Group B: 10–16 February 2019 (Fiji); Group C: 23 February – 1 March 2019 (Vanuatu); Group D: 24 February – 2 March 2019 (Solomon Islands)
Quarter-finals	5 March 2019 (Auckland, New Zealand)	6–7 April 2019
Semi-finals	5 March 2019 (Auckland, New Zealand)	28 April 2019
Final	5 March 2019 (Auckland, New Zealand)	11 May 2019

== Qualifying stage ==
The draw for the qualifying stage was held on 13 November 2018 at the OFC Headquarters in Auckland, New Zealand. The champions of the host association (Cook Islands) were allocated to Position 1, and the champions of the three remaining developing associations were drawn to determine the fixtures (first team drawn allocated to Position 2, second team drawn allocated to Position 3, third team drawn allocated to Position 4). The four teams in the qualifying stage played each other on a round-robin basis at a centralised venue. The winners and runners-up advanced to the group stage to join the 14 direct entrants. Matches were played between 26 January – 1 February 2019 in the Cook Islands.

Pos	Team	Pld	W	D	L	GF	GA	GD	Pts	Qualification	TUP	KIW	LOT	PAG
1	(Cook Islands) Tupapa Maraerenga (H)	3	3	0	0	10	3	+7	9	Group stage	—	4–1	4–1	2–1
2	(Samoa) Kiwi	3	2	0	1	14	8	+6	6	Group stage	—	—	—	4–3
3	(Tonga) Lotohaʻapai United	3	1	0	2	7	14	−7	3		—	1–9	—	—
4	(American Samoa) Pago Youth	3	0	0	3	5	11	−6	0		—	—	1–5	—

Source: OFC
(H) Hosts

== Group stage ==
The draw for the group stage was held on 13 November 2018 at the OFC Headquarters in Auckland, New Zealand. The 16 teams (14 teams entering the group stage and two teams advancing from the qualifying stage) were drawn into four groups of four, with the following mechanism:

- The champions of the four host associations (Fiji, New Caledonia, Solomon Islands, Vanuatu) were drawn into Position 1 of Groups A–D.
- The champions of the three remaining developed associations, and the runners-up of New Zealand, by virtue of having the best second team in the 2018 OFC Champions League, were drawn into Position 2 of Groups A–D.
- The runners-up of the six developed associations apart from New Zealand were drawn into Position 3 of Groups A–D and Position 4 of Groups A–B (first team drawn to Groups A–B allocated to Position 3, second team drawn to Groups A–B allocated to Position 4). Teams from the same association could not be drawn into the same group.
- The winners and runners-up of the qualifying stage, whose identity was not known at the time of the draw, were drawn into Position 4 of Groups C–D.

The four teams in each group played each other on a round-robin basis at a centralised venue. The winners and runners-up of each group advanced to the quarter-finals of the knockout stage. Matches were played on the following dates and venues:

- Group A matches were played between 10 and 16 February 2019 in New Caledonia.
- Group B matches were played between 10 and 16 February 2019 in Fiji.
- Group C matches were played between 23 February – 1 March 2019 in Vanuatu.
- Group D matches were played between 24 February – 2 March 2019 in the Solomon Islands.

=== Group A ===
Pos	Team	Pld	W	D	L	GF	GA	GD	Pts	Qualification	HIE	TOT	TEF	MAL
1	(New Caledonia) Hienghène Sport (H)	3	2	1	0	7	1	+6	7	Knockout stage	—	1–1	1–0	—
2	(Papua New Guinea) Toti City	3	1	2	0	8	6	+2	5	Knockout stage	—	—	3–3	—
3	(French Polynesia) Tefana	3	0	2	1	6	7	−1	2		—	—	—	3–3
4	(Vanuatu) Malampa Revivors	3	0	1	2	5	12	−7	1		0–5	2–4	—	—

Source: OFC
(H) Hosts

=== Group B ===
Pos	Team	Pld	W	D	L	GF	GA	GD	Pts	Qualification	CEN	HEN	LAU	MOR
1	(French Polynesia) Central Sport	3	2	1	0	12	4	+8	7	Knockout stage	—	3–2	—	—
2	(Solomon Islands) Henderson Eels	3	2	0	1	15	8	+7	6	Knockout stage	—	—	—	7–0
3	(Fiji) Lautoka (H)	3	1	1	1	12	8	+4	4		2–2	5–6	—	—
4	(Papua New Guinea) Morobe Wawens	3	0	0	3	0	19	−19	0		0–7	—	0–5	—

Source: OFC
(H) Hosts

=== Group C ===
Pos	Team	Pld	W	D	L	GF	GA	GD	Pts	Qualification	WEL	BAF	ERA	KIW
1	(New Zealand) Team Wellington	3	3	0	0	18	0	+18	9	Knockout stage	—	2–0	—	—
2	(Fiji) Ba	3	1	1	1	6	4	+2	4	Knockout stage	—	—	—	5–1
3	(Vanuatu) Erakor Golden Star (H)	3	1	1	1	3	4	−1	4		0–3	1–1	—	—
4	(Samoa) Kiwi	3	0	0	3	1	20	−19	0		0–13	—	0–2	—

Source: OFC
(H) Hosts

=== Group D ===
Pos	Team	Pld	W	D	L	GF	GA	GD	Pts	Qualification	AUC	MAG	SWA	TUP
1	(New Zealand) Auckland City	3	3	0	0	23	1	+22	9	Knockout stage	—	2–1	—	—
2	(New Caledonia) Magenta	3	2	0	1	14	3	+11	6	Knockout stage	—	—	—	10–1
3	(Solomon Islands) Solomon Warriors (H)	3	1	0	2	10	10	0	3		0–6	0–3	—	—
4	(Cook Islands) Tupapa Maraerenga	3	0	0	3	2	35	−33	0		0–15	—	1–10	—

Source: OFC
(H) Hosts

== Knockout stage ==
The eight teams in the knockout stage played on a single-elimination basis, with each tie played as a single match.

=== Bracket ===
The bracket was decided after the draw for the knockout stage (quarter-finals, semi-finals, and final), which was held on 5 March 2019 at the OFC Headquarters in Auckland, New Zealand.

Quarter-finals
(French Polynesia) Central Sport	0
(New Caledonia) Magenta	8
(New Zealand) Auckland City	4
(Papua New Guinea) Toti City	1
(New Caledonia) Hienghène Sport (a.e.t.)	2
(Fiji) Ba	1
(New Zealand) Team Wellington	6
(Solomon Islands) Henderson Eels	1

Semi-finals
(New Caledonia) Magenta	2
(New Zealand) Auckland City	1
(New Caledonia) Hienghène Sport	2
(New Zealand) Team Wellington	0

Final
(New Caledonia) Magenta	0
(New Caledonia) Hienghène Sport	1

=== Quarter-finals ===
In the quarter-finals, the winners of one group played the runners-up of another group (teams from same group could not play each other), with the group winners hosting the match, and the matchups decided by draw. The quarter-finals were played between 6–7 April 2019.

Team 1	Score	Team 2
Central Sport (French Polynesia)	0–8	(New Caledonia) Magenta
Auckland City (New Zealand)	4–0	(Papua New Guinea) Toti City
Hienghène Sport (New Caledonia)	2–1 (a.e.t.)	(Fiji) Ba
Team Wellington (New Zealand)	6–1	(Solomon Islands) Henderson Eels

=== Semi-finals ===
In the semi-finals, the four quarter-final winners played in two ties, with the matchups and host teams decided by draw. The semi-finals were played on 28 April 2019.

Team 1	Score	Team 2
Hienghène Sport (New Caledonia)	2–0	(New Zealand) Team Wellington
Magenta (New Caledonia)	2–1	(New Zealand) Auckland City

=== Final ===
In the final, the two semi-final winners played each other, with the host team decided by draw. The final was played on 11 May 2019.

11 May 2019
17:00 UTC+11

Magenta (New Caledonia)	0–1	(New Caledonia) Hienghène Sport
	Report	Roine 66'

Stade Numa-Daly Magenta, Nouméa
Attendance: 7,000
Referee: Matthew Conger (New Zealand)

== Top goalscorers ==
Team eliminated / inactive for this round.

Rank	Player	Team	QS1	QS2	QS3	GS1	GS2	GS3	QF	SF	F	Total
1	(England) Ross Allen	(New Zealand) Team Wellington				1	6	1	3			11
2	(Papua New Guinea) David Browne	(New Zealand) Auckland City					2	1	3			6
2	(New Caledonia) Yorick Hnautra	(New Caledonia) Magenta						4	2			6
2	(New Caledonia) Kevin Nemia	(New Caledonia) Magenta						2	3	1		6
2	(Samoa) Paulo Scanlan	(Samoa) Kiwi		2	4							6
6	(French Polynesia) Sylvain Graglia	(French Polynesia) Central Sport				1	4					5
6	(Solomon Islands) Micah Lea'alafa	(New Zealand) Auckland City				1	2	1		1		5
8	(Cook Islands) Maro Bonsu-Maro	(New Zealand) Auckland City					4					4
8	(Papua New Guinea) Nigel Dabinyaba	(Papua New Guinea) Toti City				2	1	1				4
8	(Papua New Guinea) Raymond Gunemba	(Papua New Guinea) Toti City				1	3					4
8	(New Caledonia) Bertrand Kaï	(New Caledonia) Hienghène Sport				3			1			4
8	(New Caledonia) Richard Sele	(New Caledonia) Magenta				1	2		1			4
8	(New Zealand) Jack-Henry Sinclair	(New Zealand) Team Wellington						2	2			4
8	(Mexico) Fabrizio Tavano	(New Zealand) Auckland City					3	1				4

== Awards ==
The following awards were given at the conclusion of the tournament.

Award	Player	Team
Golden Ball	(New Caledonia) Bertrand Kaï	(New Caledonia) Hienghène Sport
Golden Boot	(England) Ross Allen	(New Zealand) Team Wellington
Golden Glove	(New Caledonia) Rocky Nyikeine	(New Caledonia) Hienghène Sport
Fair Play Award	—	(New Zealand) Auckland City
