= 2019 OFC Champions League qualifying stage =

The 2019 OFC Champions League qualifying stage was played from 26 January to 1 February 2019. A total of four teams competed in the qualifying stage to decide two of the 16 places in the group stage of the 2019 OFC Champions League.

== Draw ==
The draw for the qualifying stage was held on 13 November 2018 at the OFC Headquarters in Auckland, New Zealand. The champions of the host association (Cook Islands) were allocated to Position 1, and the champions of the three remaining developing associations were drawn to determine the fixtures (first team drawn allocated to Position 2, second team drawn allocated to Position 3, third team drawn allocated to Position 4).

Host team	Remaining teams
(Cook Islands) Tupapa Maraerenga	(American Samoa) Pago Youth; (Samoa) Kiwi (Note: The identity of the teams from Samoa and Tonga was not known at the time of the draw.); (Tonga) Lotohaʻapai United

== Format ==
The four teams in the qualifying stage played each other on a round-robin basis at a centralised venue. The winners and runners-up advanced to the group stage to join the 14 direct entrants. According to the group stage draw:

- The qualifying stage winners advanced to Group D.
- The qualifying stage runners-up advanced to Group C.

== Schedule ==
Matches were played between 26 January – 1 February 2019 in the Cook Islands. The schedule of each matchday was as follows.

Matchday	Dates	Matches
Matchday 1	26 January 2019	Team 2 vs. Team 3, Team 1 vs. Team 4
Matchday 2	29 January 2019	Team 4 vs. Team 2, Team 1 vs. Team 3
Matchday 3	1 February 2019	Team 3 vs. Team 4, Team 1 vs. Team 2

== Matches ==
All times were local, CKT (UTC−10).

Pos	Team	Pld	W	D	L	GF	GA	GD	Pts	Qualification	TUP	KIW	LOT	PAG
1	(Cook Islands) Tupapa Maraerenga (H)	3	3	0	0	10	3	+7	9	Group stage	—	4–1	4–1	2–1
2	(Samoa) Kiwi	3	2	0	1	14	8	+6	6	Group stage	—	—	—	4–3
3	(Tonga) Lotohaʻapai United	3	1	0	2	7	14	−7	3		—	1–9	—	—
4	(American Samoa) Pago Youth	3	0	0	3	5	11	−6	0		—	—	1–5	—

Source: OFC
(H) Hosts
26 January 2019
14:30

Pago Youth (American Samoa)	1–5	(Tonga) Lotohaʻapai United
Samuelu 45'	Report	T. Falepapalangi 53', 66', 69'; P. Falepapalangi 83'

CIFA Academy Field, Matavera
Attendance: 100
Referee: Hamilton Siau (Solomon Islands)
26 January 2019
17:30

Tupapa Maraerenga (Cook Islands)	4–1	(Samoa) Kiwi
Simiona 7'; Harmon 18'; Barringer-Tahiri 27'; Mata 70' (pen.)	Report	Diaz 22' (pen.)

CIFA Academy Field, Matavera
Attendance: 200
Referee: Peter Linney (New Zealand)

29 January 2019
14:30

Kiwi (Samoa)	4–3	(American Samoa) Pago Youth
Kerewi 20'; Scanlan 29' (pen.), 85'; Nauer 34'	Report	Tapusoa 21', 39', 80'

CIFA Academy Field, Matavera
Attendance: 100
Referee: Ben Aukwai (Solomon Islands)
29 January 2019
17:30

Tupapa Maraerenga (Cook Islands)	4–1	(Tonga) Lotohaʻapai United
Colligan 1'; Mata 7' (pen.), 63'; Harmon 59'	Report	Lutu 43'

CIFA Academy Field, Matavera
Attendance: 200
Referee: Veer Singh (Fiji)

1 February 2019
14:30

Lotohaʻapai United (Tonga)	1–9	(Samoa) Kiwi
Polovili 58'	Report	Scanlan 3', 40', 43', 74'; Mano 11', 89'; Malo 26'; Taylor 51'; Nauer 82'

CIFA Academy Field, Matavera
Attendance: 100
Referee: Peter Linney (New Zealand)
1 February 2019
17:30

Tupapa Maraerenga (Cook Islands)	2–1	(American Samoa) Pago Youth
Ahmed 47'; Simiona 89'	Report	Pati 29'

CIFA Academy Field, Matavera
Attendance: 200
Referee: Roger Adams (Papua New Guinea)
