= List of New Caledonia international footballers =

The New Caledonia national football team represents the territory of New Caledonia in international association football. It is fielded by Fédération Calédonienne de Football, the governing body of football in New Caledonia, and competes as a member of the Oceania Football Confederation (OFC), which encompasses the countries of Oceania. New Caledonia played their first international match on 19 September 1951 in a 2–0 loss to New Zealand in Nouméa.

New Caledonia have competed in numerous competitions, and all players who have played in at least one international match, either as a member of the starting eleven or as a substitute, are listed below. Each player's details include his playing position while with the team, the number of caps earned and goals scored in all international matches, and details of the first and most recent matches played in. The names are initially ordered by number of caps (in descending order), then by date of debut, then by alphabetical order. All statistics are correct up to and including the match played on 21 September 2022.

== Key ==
Positions key
GK	Goalkeeper
DF	Defender
MF	Midfielder
FW	Forward

Position
Playing positions are listed according to the tactical formations that were employed at the time.
Caps and goals
Caps and goals comprise those in the FIFA World Cup and OFC Nations Cup, Melanesia Cup, their associated qualification matches, as well as Pacific Games, Pacific Mini Games matches and international friendly tournaments and matches.

== Players ==
New Caledonia national team football players
Player	Pos.	Caps	Goals	Debut		Last or most recent match		Ref.
Player	Pos.	Caps	Goals	Date	Opponent	Date	Opponent	Ref.
Bertrand Kaï	FW	43	23	14 June 2008	Vanuatu	24 March 2022	New Zealand	
Emile Béaruné	DF	41	0	23 September 2010	Guadeloupe	21 March 2022	Papua New Guinea	
Pierre Wajoka	MF	39	13	30 June 2003	Papua New Guinea	9 September 2011	Solomon Islands	
Joël Wakanumuné	MF	39	1	27 August 2011	Vanuatu	24 March 2022	New Zealand	
César Zeoula	MF	35	10	24 September 2008	Tahiti	21 March 2022	Papua New Guinea	
Iamel Kabeu	FW	34	20	16 March 2002	Tonga	22 March 2013	New Zealand	
Roy Kayara	MF	31	8	10 September 2008	New Zealand	21 March 2019	Mauritius	
Michel Hmaé	FW	28	22	30 June 2003	Papua New Guinea	7 September 2011	Tahiti	
André Sinédo	DF	27	1	6 July 2002	Fiji	3 September 2011	American Samoa	
Jean-Patrick Wakanumuné	DF	25	0	17 July 2007	Vanuatu	26 March 2013	Tahiti	
Marius Mapou	MF	24	5	8 April 2000	Solomon Islands	3 October 2008	Mayotte	
Rocky Nyikeine	GK	22	0	1 September 2011	Tuvalu	18 March 2022	Fiji	
Georges Gope-Fenepej	FW	21	15	24 January 2011	Vanuatu	21 March 2022	Papua New Guinea	
Georges Wadrenges	DF	20	0	17 July 2007	Vanuatu	29 September 2010	Tahiti	
Georges Béaruné	DF	20	0	3 April 2011	Tahiti	17 November 2018	Vanuatu	
Cédric Sansot	MF	20	0	26 March 2016	Vanuatu	24 March 2022	New Zealand	
Olivier Dokunengo	MF	19	1	1 July 2003	Federated States of Micronesia	26 March 2013	Tahiti	
Noël Kaudré	MF	19	1	17 November 2007	Fiji	26 March 2013	Tahiti	
Judikael Ixoée	DF	19	1	29 October 2010	Tahiti	22 June 2016	Malaysia	
Michel Hne	GK	18	0	6 July 2002	Fiji	7 May 2011	Réunion	
Marius Bako	MF	18	3	17 November 2007	Fiji	10 June 2012	Tahiti	
Ramon Djamali	FW	17	6	30 June 2003	Papua New Guinea	30 September 2008	Martinique	
Patrick Diaiké	MF	17	1	17 July 2007	Vanuatu	24 January 2011	Vanuatu	
Joseph Athale	DF	17	0	26 March 2016	Vanuatu	21 September 2022	Solomon Islands	
Richard Sele	DF	17	2	5 October 2016	Solomon Islands	24 March 2002	New Zealand	
Luther Wahnyamalla	MF	16	0	17 July 2007	Vanuatu	24 September 2012	Mayotte	
Yohann Mercier	DF	16	1	25 August 2007	Tahiti	15 November 2016	New Zealand	
Dominique Wacalie	MF	14	0	27 August 2011	Vanuatu	26 March 2013	Tahiti	
Marc Ounemoa	GK	13	0	9 March 2002	American Samoa	5 June 2012	Samoa	
Jacques Haeko	FW	13	9	27 August 2011	Vanuatu	16 October 2012	Solomon Islands	
Jacques Dahote	MF	12	1	6 July 2002	Fiji	19 May 2004	Tonga	
Benjamin Longue	DF	12	0	30 June 2003	Papua New Guinea	7 May 2011	Réunion	
Brice Dahité	MF	12	1	26 March 2016	Vanuatu	23 March 2018	Tahiti	
Mickaël Ulile	GK	12	0	8 October 2016	Solomon Islands	21 September 2022	Solomon Islands	
Franck Oiremoin	DF	11	0	6 July 2002	Fiji	19 May 2004	Tonga	
José Hmaé	MF	11	4	12 May 2004	Tahiti	7 September 2007	Fiji	
Cédric Decoire	MF	11	3	20 March 2016	Tahiti	21 September 2022	Solomon Islands	
Joseph Tchako	DF	11	0	26 March 2016	Vanuatu	15 July 2019	Tahiti	
Jean-Brice Wadriako	DF	11	1	29 May 2016	Papua New Guinea	24 March 2022	New Zealand	
Paul Poatinda	FW	10	10	30 June 2003	Papua New Guinea	19 May 2004	Tonga	
Wilson Forest	DF	10	0	17 July 2007	Vanuatu	29 September 2010	Tahiti	
Joris Gorendiawe	MF	10	1	23 September 2010	Guadeloupe	3 September 2011	American Samoa	
Loic Wakanumuné	DF	10	0	23 September 2010	Guadeloupe	15 November 2016	New Zealand	
Nathanael Hmaen	FW	10	4	26 March 2016	Vanuatu	18 July 2019	Tuvalu	
Jean-Marc Case	DF	9	1	9 March 2002	American Samoa	11 July 2003	Fiji	
Robert Kaume	MF	9	4	9 March 2002	American Samoa	19 May 2004	Tonga	
Jean-Christ Wajoka	DF	9	1	26 March 2016	Vanuatu	18 July 2019	Tuvalu	
Jean-Philippe Saiko	FW	9	12	29 May 2016	Papua New Guinea	24 March 2022	New Zealand	
Gil Elmour	DF	8	1	6 July 2002	Fiji	12 May 2004	Tahiti	
Maurice Cawa	MF	8	1	6 July 2002	Fiji	11 July 2003	Fiji	
Miguel Kayara	MF	8	0	1 June 2002	Vanuatu	26 March 2013	Tahiti	
Poulidor Toto	FW	8	3	17 July 2007	Vanuatu	6 September 2008	New Zealand	
Geordy Gony	MF	8	1	7 June 2017	Fiji	18 July 2019	Tuvalu	
Shene Wélépane	MF	8	3	7 June 2017	Fiji	21 September 2022	Solomon Islands	
Gaétan Gope-Iwate	MF	8	2	2 December 2017	Vanuatu	21 March 2019	Mauritius	
Steve Longue	FW	7	1	8 April 2000	Solomon Islands	19 May 2004	Tonga	
Jean-Yann Dounezek	GK	7	0	17 July 2007	Vanuatu	9 September 2011	Solomon Islands	
Jonathan Kakou	DF	7	0	6 September 2008	New Zealand	5 June 2012	Samoa	
Jacques Wamytan	DF	7	0	11 June 2017	Fiji	18 July 2019	Tuvalu	
Warren Houala	FW	7	1	26 November 2017	Estonia	23 March 2018	Tahiti	
Jacky Wiako	DF	6	1	30 June 2003	Papua New Guinea	15 May 2004	Solomon Islands	
Jean-Louis Toto	FW	6	0	17 July 2007	Vanuatu	3 September 2007	Fiji	
Jean-Chrys Xénie	DF	6	0	17 July 2007	Vanuatu	20 June 2008	Vanuatu	
Allan Hnautra	MF	6	0	6 September 2008	New Zealand	3 October 2008	Mayotte	
Patrick Qaézé	DF	6	1	3 April 2011	Tahiti	5 September 2011	Solomon Islands	
Arsene Boawe	MF	6	1	4 May 2011	Réunion	7 September 2011	Tahiti	
Thomas Schmidt	GK	6	0	26 March 2016	Vanuatu	15 November 2016	New Zealand	
Pierre Kauma	DF	6	0	8 October 2016	Solomon Islands	24 March 2022	New Zealand	
Mickael Tiaou	DF	6	0	18 March 2019	Fiji	18 July 2019	Tuvalu	
Joris Pibke	FW	5	11	8 April 2000	Solomon Islands	18 March 2002	Samoa	
Yves Faye	FW	5	0	11 April 2000	Papua New Guinea	10 July 2002	Vanuatu	
Théodore Pian	DF	5	1	8 July 2002	Australia	19 May 2004	Tonga	
Robert Wayaridri	DF	5	0	17 July 2007	Vanuatu	7 September 2007	Fiji	
Adolphe Boaoutho	DF	5	0	19 July 2007	Vanuatu	21 November 2007	Fiji	
Jean-Paul Read	DF	5	0	24 January 2011	Vanuatu	7 May 2011	Réunion	
Pierre Nyikeine	DF	5	0	12 September 2012	Tahiti	16 October 2012	Solomon Islands	
Jacky Meindu	MF	5	0	1 June 2016	Samoa	8 October 2016	Solomon Islands	
Jorys Mène	DF	5	0	12 November 2016	New Zealand	15 July 2019	Tahiti	
Didier Simane	MF	5	0	7 June 2017	Fiji	15 July 2019	Tahiti	
Mone Wamowe	FW	5	2	7 June 2017	Fiji	23 March 2018	Tahiti	
Marino Akapo	MF	5	0	2 December 2017	Vanuatu	15 December 2017	Fiji	
Dominique Wel	DF	5	0	2 December 2017	Vanuatu	15 December 2017	Fiji	
Louis Ukajo	DF	5	0	8 July 2019	American Samoa	18 July 2019	Tuvalu	
David Hay	MF	4	2	12 March 2002	Papua New Guinea	10 July 2002	Vanuatu	
John Luenu	MF	4	1	1 July 2003	Federated States of Micronesia	11 July 2003	Fiji	
Nicolas Ouka	MF	4	1	1 July 2003	Federated States of Micronesia	19 May 2004	Tonga	
Francis Watrone	MF	4	1	3 July 2003	Tonga	29 September 2010	Tahiti	
Jules Wea	MF	4	0	12 May 2004	Tahiti	19 May 2004	Tonga	
André Naxue	MF	4	0	17 July 2007	Vanuatu	5 September 2007	Solomon Islands	
Kalaye Gnipate	FW	4	1	14 June 2008	Vanuatu	26 March 2013	Tahiti	
Michel Hmeun	FW	4	1	24 September 2008	Tahiti	3 October 2008	Mayotte	
Julien Jeansoule	MF	4	0	24 January 2011	Vanuatu	7 May 2011	Réunion	
Jérémie Dokunengo	DF	4	0	7 September 2012	New Zealand	11 June 2017	Fiji	
Steve Ixoée	GK	4	0	26 March 2013	Tahiti	8 June 2016	New Zealand	
Leon Wahnawe	FW	4	0	26 March 2016	Vanuatu	23 March 2018	Tahiti	
Patrick Gohe	MF	4	0	2 December 2017	Vanuatu	15 December 2017	Fiji	
Jean Baptiste Waitreü	FW	4	1	2 December 2017	Vanuatu	15 December 2017	Fiji	
Renzo Wejieme	MF	4	0	2 December 2017	Vanuatu	15 December 2017	Fiji	
Cyril Drawilo	MF	4	0	14 November 2018	Vanuatu	21 March 2019	Mauritius	
Willy Waheo	DF	4	0	14 November 2018	Vanuatu	18 July 2019	Tuvalu	
Stéphane Tein-Padom	FW	4	1	8 July 2019	American Samoa	18 July 2019	Tuvalu	
Jordan Wetria	FW	4	1	18 March 2022	Fiji	21 September 2022	Solomon Islands	
Raymond Wayaridri		3	4	10 September 1991	Fiji	17 September 1991	Solomon Islands	
Didier W		3	3	8 April 2000	Solomon Islands	11 April 2000	Papua New Guinea	
José Euribora	FW	3	2	9 March 2002	American Samoa	16 March 2002	Tonga	
Tell Voudjo	MF	3	3	9 March 2002	American Samoa	16 March 2002	Tonga	
Pierre Tidjine	FW	3	0	6 July 2002	Fiji	10 July 2002	Vanuatu	
Louis Samek	GK	3	0	1 July 2003	Federated States of Micronesia	19 May 2004	Tonga	
Patrick Drawilo	MF	3	0	19 July 2007	Vanuatu	29 August 2007	Cook Islands	
Dimitri Petemou	GK	3	0	7 April 2011	Tahiti	22 June 2016	Malaysia	
Dick Kauma	DF	3	1	1 June 2012	Vanuatu	22 September 2012	Martinique	
Joerisse Cexome	MF	3	1	26 March 2016	Vanuatu	8 June 2016	New Zealand	
Morgan Mathelon	FW	3	0	26 March 2016	Vanuatu	21 March 2022	Papua New Guinea	
Kevin Nemia	FW	3	1	1 June 2016	Samoa	18 July 2019	Fiji	
Emile Ounei	FW	3	2	11 June 2017	Fiji	23 March 2018	Tahiti	
Romaric Walone	DF	3	0	11 June 2017	Fiji	21 March 2019	Mauritius	
Jean-Philibert Outiou	FW	3	1	26 November 2017	Estonia	23 March 2018	Tahiti	
Pothin Poma	MF	3	0	26 November 2017	Estonia	5 December 2017	Tuvalu	
Johannes Bernole	DF	3	0	2 December 2017	Vanuatu	12 December 2017	Solomon Islands	
Romaric Luépack	MF	3	1	2 December 2017	Vanuatu	12 December 2017	Solomon Islands	
Maki Romone	MF	3	0	2 December 2017	Vanuatu	12 December 2017	Solomon Islands	
Jean-Jacques Katrawa	FW	3	0	5 December 2017	Tuvalu	12 December 2017	Solomon Islands	
Clarence Nyipie	DF	3	0	5 December 2017	Tuvalu	15 December 2017	Fiji	
Jimmy Wélépane	DF	3	0	5 December 2017	Tuvalu	12 December 2017	Solomon Islands	
Jean-Philippe Sciendi	DF	3	0	17 November 2018	Vanuatu	21 March 2019	Mauritius	
Pierre Bako	MF	3	0	18 March 2022	Fiji	21 September 2022	Solomon Islands	
Joris Kenon	MF	3	0	18 March 2022	Fiji	24 March 2022	New Zealand	
Christopher Wacalie	MF	3	0	18 March 2022	Fiji	21 March 2022	Solomon Islands	
Ferrand Waneissi		2	5	3 November 1990	Papua New Guinea	15 September 1991	Guam	
Adrias Aussu		2	2	25 July 1992	Vanuatu	28 July 1992	Fiji	
Abel Tchaunyane		2	2	28 July 1992	Fiji	30 July 1992	Solomon Islands	
Michel Wanakaija	MF	2	1	9 March 2002	American Samoa	16 March 2002	Tonga	
Alain Kecine	DF	2	0	15 May 2004	Solomon Islands	19 May 2004	Tonga	
James Hue	MF	2	0	17 July 2007	Vanuatu	19 July 2007	Vanuatu	
Fabian Saridjan	MF	2	0	17 November 2007	Fiji	21 November 2007	Fiji	
Loic Houala	DF	2	0	27 September 2008	Guadeloupe	3 October 2008	Mayotte	
Kenji Vendegou	DF	2	1	3 September 2011	American Samoa	9 September 2011	Solomon Islands	
Cedric Moagou	FW	2	0	22 September 2012	Martinique	24 September 2012	Mayotte	
Paul Roine	FW	2	0	5 October 2016	Solomon Islands	8 October 2016	Solomon Islands	
Willy Waia	FW	2	0	7 June 2017	Fiji	11 June 2017	Fiji	
Henri Boucheron	FW	2	0	5 December 2017	Tuvalu	15 December 2017	Fiji	
Elo Gowé	DF	2	0	5 December 2017	Tuvalu	15 December 2017	Fiji	
Ritchi Iwa	MF	2	0	5 December 2017	Tuvalu	15 December 2017	Fiji	
Cau Poanoui	FW	2	0	5 December 2017	Tuvalu	15 December 2017	Fiji	
Anthony Kai	FW	2	0	14 November 2018	Vanuatu	17 November 2018	Vanuatu	
Antoine Roine	FW	2	2	14 November 2018	Vanuatu	17 November 2018	Vanuatu	
Kiam Wanesse	DF	2	0	17 November 2018	Vanuatu	18 March 2019	Fiji	
Luc Washetine	GK	2	0	17 November 2018	Vanuatu	21 March 2019	Mauritius	
Raphael Oiremoin	FW	2	0	18 March 2019	Fiji	21 March 2019	Mauritius	
Jean-Gilles Hnamuko	GK	2	0	8 July 2019	American Samoa	24 March 2022	New Zealand	
Jekob Jeno	MF	2	0	15 July 2019	Tahiti	18 July 2019	Tuvalu	
Jean-Luc Decoire	DF	2	0	18 March 2022	Fiji	21 March 2022	Papua New Guinea	
Germain Haewegene	FW	2	0	21 March 2022	Papua New Guinea	24 March 2022	New Zealand	
David Béaruné	MF	2	0	17 September 2022	Fiji	21 September 2022	Solomon Islands	
Jean-Pierre Bob	DF	2	0	17 September 2022	Fiji	21 September 2022	Solomon Islands	
Bernard Iwa	DF	2	0	17 September 2022	Fiji	21 September 2022	Solomon Islands	
Martin Makam	DF	2	0	17 September 2022	Fiji	21 September 2022	Solomon Islands	
Romayel Nepamoindou	FW	2	0	17 September 2022	Fiji	21 September 2022	Solomon Islands	
Jules Omei	MF	2	0	17 September 2022	Fiji	21 September 2022	Solomon Islands	
Claude Wadela	FW	2	0	17 September 2022	Fiji	21 September 2022	Solomon Islands	
Pierre Boano		1	2	15 September 1991	Guam	15 September 1991	Guam	
Georges Decoire		1	3	15 September 1991	Guam	15 September 1991	Guam	
Jean-Jacques Reveillon		1	2	15 September 1991	Guam	15 September 1991	Guam	
Léon Waitrinyie		1	4	15 September 1991	Guam	15 September 1991	Guam	
Alexander E		1	0	11 April 2000	Papua New Guinea	11 April 2000	Papua New Guinea	
Patrice M		1	0	11 April 2000	Papua New Guinea	11 April 2000	Papua New Guinea	
Steeve Pongoudou		1	0	9 March 2002	American Samoa	9 March 2002	American Samoa	
Ricardo Nepamoindou	DF	1	0	8 July 2002	Australia	8 July 2002	Australia	
Stone Longue	MF	1	0	10 July 2002	Vanuatu	10 July 2002	Vanuatu	
Francis Dremon	GK	1	0	17 May 2004	Cook Islands	17 May 2004	Cook Islands	
Jacques Hapelama	DF	1	0	17 May 2004	Cook Islands	17 May 2004	Cook Islands	
Robert Wadriako	DF	1	0	17 May 2004	Cook Islands	17 May 2004	Cook Islands	
Willy Hne	MF	1	0	17 July 2007	Vanuatu	17 July 2007	Vanuatu	
Albert Kaqea	FW	1	0	17 July 2007	Vanuatu	17 July 2007	Vanuatu	
Jaerson Haeweng	MF	1	0	20 June 2008	Vanuatu	20 June 2008	Vanuatu	
Cédric Nonmeu	MF	1	0	10 September 2008	New Zealand	10 September 2008	New Zealand	
Robert Dokunengo	DF	1	0	24 January 2011	Vanuatu	24 January 2011	Vanuatu	
Dominique Sawa	DF	1	0	24 January 2011	Vanuatu	24 January 2011	Vanuatu	
Pierre Waboula	GK	1	0	24 January 2011	Vanuatu	24 January 2011	Vanuatu	
Leopold Makalu	DF	1	0	3 April 2011	Tahiti	3 April 2011	Tahiti	
Iller Hnauk	MF	1	0	7 June 2017	Fiji	7 June 2017	Fiji	
Johan Idrele	MF	1	0	26 November 2017	Estonia	26 November 2017	Estonia	
Glen Wayaridri	FW	1	0	26 November 2017	Estonia	26 November 2017	Estonia	
Nathanaël Hlemu	GK	1	0	15 December 2017	Tuvalu	15 December 2017	Tuvalu	
Louis Laoumana	FW	1	0	14 November 2018	Vanuatu	14 November 2018	Vanuatu	
Cameron Wadenges	DF	1	0	17 November 2018	Vanuatu	17 November 2018	Vanuatu	
Raymond Saihuliwa	GK	1	0	18 March 2019	Fiji	18 March 2019	Fiji	
Nemia Nemia	MF	1	0	21 March 2019	Mauritius	21 March 2019	Mauritius	
Titouan Richard	MF	1	0	18 March 2022	Fiji	18 March 2022	Fiji	
Roberto Neoere	MF	1	0	24 March 2022	New Zealand	24 March 2022	New Zealand	
Louis Piaa	MF	1	0	24 March 2022	New Zealand	24 March 2022	New Zealand	
William Rokuad	DF	1	0	24 March 2022	New Zealand	24 March 2022	New Zealand	
Vincent Vakié	DF	1	0	24 March 2022	New Zealand	24 March 2022	New Zealand	
Lues Waya	FW	1	0	24 March 2022	New Zealand	24 March 2022	New Zealand	
Justin Dawano	GK	1	0	10 July 2022	Vanuatu	10 July 2022	Vanuatu	
Brice Watrone	DF	1	0	21 September 2022	Solomon Islands	21 September 2022	Solomon Islands	
