= 2015–16 Tahiti Ligue 1 =

Tahiti Ligue 1
- Season: 2015–16
- Champions: AS Tefana
- Relegated: Aorai
- Matches played: 87
- Goals scored: 418 (4.8 per match)
- Top goalscorer: (French Polynesia) Temarii Tinorua (27 goals)

The 2015–16 Tahiti Ligue 1 is the 69th season of top-flight football in Tahiti. Tefana are the defending champions having won their fourth title last season.

== Teams ==
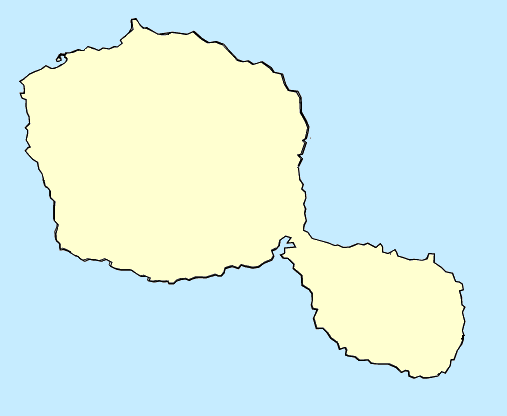
Location of the 2015–16 Tahiti Ligue 1 teams.

A total of eight sides will compete in the 2015–16 campaign. The top side will qualify for a place in the 2017 OFC Champions League, while the bottom two will be relegated to Tahiti Ligue 2.

Team	Stadium	Location	Capacity	Manager
Aorai	Stade De Taunoa	Papeete	1,000	
Central Sport	Stade Pater Te Hono Nui	Pirae	15,000	
Dragon	Stade Vélodrome Dr. Pierre Cassiau	Papeete	5,000	Ludovic Graugnard
Manu-Ura	Stade Paea	Paea	10,000	Pita Teivitau
Pirae	Stade Vélodrome Dr. Pierre Cassiau	Papeete	5,000	Samuel Garcia
Taiarapu	Stade Teahupo'o	Teahupo'o	1,200	
Tefana	Stade Louis Ganivet	Faaa	5,000	Sébastien Labayen
Vénus	Stade Pater Te Hono Nui	Pirae	15,000	

== League table ==
Pos	Team	Pld	W	D	L	GF	GA	GD	BP	Pts	Qualification or relegation
1	Tefana (C)	21	19	2	0	103	20	+83	4	84	Qualified to the 2017 OFC Champions League
2	Central Sport	21	11	1	9	48	51	−3	10	65	Qualified to the 2017 OFC Champions League
3	Vénus	21	9	6	6	45	42	+3	8	62	Qualified to the Championship Playoff
4	Pirae	21	10	1	10	58	62	−4	10	62	Qualified to the Championship Playoff
5	Manu-Ura	21	11	3	7	48	48	0	2	59	
6	Dragon	21	4	7	10	41	53	−12	6	46	
7	Taiarapu	21	3	4	14	39	68	−29	10	44	
8	Aorai (R)	21	3	4	14	23	61	−38	2	36	Relegation to Tahiti Ligue 2

Updated to match(es) played on 21 March 2016. Source: RSSSF
Rules for classification: 1) points; 2) goal difference; 3) number of goals scored. 4 points for a win, 2 points for a draw, 1 point for a defeat.
(C) Champions; (R) Relegated

== Championship playoff ==
=== Bracket ===
Semi-finals
28 March
Tefana	6
Pirae	1
28 March
Central Sport	4
Vénus	0

Final
23 April
Tefana (p)	1 (6)
Central Sport	1 (5)

=== Semi-finals ===
28 March 2016
12:00

Tefana	6–1	Pirae

Stade Pater, Pirae

28 March 2016
15:30

Central Sport	4–0	Vénus

Stade Pater, Pirae

=== Final ===
1 April 2016

Tefana	1–1 (a.e.t.)	Central Sport
Graglia 58'		Paama 90+4'
Penalties
	6–5

Stade Pater, Pirae

== Top scorers ==
Rank	Player	Club	Goals
1	(French Polynesia) Temarii Tinorua	Tefana	27
2	(French Polynesia) Teaonui Tehau	Vénus	13

== Hat-tricks ==
Player	For	Against	Score	Date
(French Polynesia) Mauarii Tehina	Venus	Pirae	5-0	13 September 2015
(French Polynesia) Temarii Tinorua	Tefana	Taravao	7-2	29 February 2016
(French Polynesia) Roonui Tinirauarii^{5}	Pirae	Taiarapu	7-2	5 March 2016
(French Polynesia) Francois Mu	Manu Ura	Central Sport	5-2	11 March 2016
(French Polynesia) Yohann Tihoni	Taiarapu	Dragon	4-4	11 March 2016
