= 2017 New Caledonia Super Ligue =

New Caledonia Super Ligue
- Season: 2017
- Champions: Hienghène Sport

The New Caledonia Super Ligue 2017 is the 44th season of top-tier Caledonian football. It started on 18 March 2017. Twelve teams take part in the championship.

The top two teams of the league, Hienghène Sport and AS Magenta, qualified for the 2019 OFC Champions League.

Many league games took place in front of hundreds of spectators.

== Standings ==
Note: 4 points for a win, 2 points for a draw, 1 point for a defeat.

Pos	Team	Pld	W	D	L	GF	GA	GD	Pts	Qualification or relegation
1	Hienghène Sport	22	17	2	3	69	23	+46	73 (Note: Technical points deductions due to failing to provide referees, qualified trainers or youth teams (final deductions confirmed on 28 January 2018, different from earlier deductions announced on 15 January 2018): Hienghène Sport: 2 pts (originally 4 pts); Lössi: 2 pts; Tiga Sports: 3 pts; Mont-Dore: 3 pts (originally 1 pt); Horizon Patho: 11 pts (originally 5 pts); Wetr: 9 pts (originally 3 pts); AGJP: 4 pts (originally 7 pts); Racing de Poindimié: 6 pts (originally 4 pts); Belep: 9 pts; Baco: 10 pts (originally 8 pts); Points deducted due to forfeits or use of ineligible players: Lössi: 1 pt; Tiga Sports: 3 pts; Head-to-head tiebreakers: Tiga Sports ahead of Mont-Dore)	Qualification to 2019 OFC Champions League
2	Magenta	22	14	5	3	57	21	+36	69	Qualification to 2019 OFC Champions League
3	Lössi	22	11	4	7	58	39	+19	56	
4	Tiga Sports	22	12	2	8	46	38	+8	54	
5	Mont-Dore	22	10	5	7	51	41	+10	54	
6	Ne Drehu	22	8	5	9	37	45	−8	51	
7	Horizon Patho	22	10	7	5	51	31	+20	48	
8	Wetr	22	7	8	7	41	35	+6	42	
9	AGJP	22	6	5	11	49	62	−13	41	
10	Racing de Poindimié	22	5	4	13	39	69	−30	35	
11	Belep	22	6	1	15	35	66	−31	32	Promotion/relegation playoff
12	Baco	22	1	2	19	28	91	−63	17	Relegation to 2018 Promotion d'Honneur

Source: Fédération Calédonienne de Football
