= 2018 Fiji Premier League =

- Season: 2018
- Champions: Lautoka F.C. (5th title)
- Relegated: Dreketi F.C.
- Matches: 56
- Goals: 149 (2.66 per match)
- Top goalscorer: Rusiate Matarerega (8 goals)

The 2018 Fiji Premier League was the 42nd season of the Fiji Premier League (Vodafone Premier League for sponsorship reasons), the top-tier football league in Fiji organized by the Fiji Football Association since its establishment in 1977. It started on 14 January 2018.

== Team changes ==
=== To Fiji Premier League ===
Promoted from 2017 Fiji Super Premier Division

- Tavua

=== From Fiji Premier League ===
Relegated to 2018 Fiji Super Premier Division

- Rakiraki

== Teams ==
=== Stadiums and locations ===
Team	Location	Stadium	Capacity
Ba	Ba	Govind Park	13,500
Dreketi	Labasa	Subrail Park	10,000
Labasa	Labasa	Subrail Park	10,000
Lautoka	Lautoka	Churchill Park	18,000
Rewa	Nausori	Vodafone Ratu Cakobau Park	8,000
Nadi	Nadi	Prince Charles Park	18,000
Suva	Suva	ANZ Stadium	30,000
Tavua	Tavua	Garvey Park	4,500

== Standings ==
Pos	Team	Pld	W	D	L	GF	GA	GD	Pts	Qualification or relegation
1	Lautoka (Q)	14	9	4	1	27	10	+17	31	Qualification to 2019 OFC Champions League
2	Ba (Q)	14	7	5	2	26	15	+11	26	Qualification to 2019 OFC Champions League
3	Nadi	14	7	3	4	21	13	+8	24	
4	Suva	14	5	4	5	20	18	+2	19	
5	Labasa	14	5	4	5	18	17	+1	19	
6	Rewa	14	3	4	7	12	18	−6	13	
7	Tavua	14	3	3	8	14	30	−16	12	
8	Dreketi (R)	14	1	5	8	11	28	−17	8	Relegation to Fiji Senior League

Updated to match(es) played on 18 September 2018. Source: FIFA
(Q) Qualified for the phase indicated; (R) Relegated

== Top scorers ==
As of match 18 September 2018

Rank	Player	Club	Goals
1	(Fiji) Rusiate Matarerega	Nadi	8
2	(Solomon Islands) Benjamin Totori	Lautoka	7
3	(Fiji) Napolioni Qasevakatini	Nadi	6
3	(Fiji) Abbu Zahid Shaheed	Ba	6
5	(Fiji) Ratu Apenisa Anare	Labasa	5
5	(Fiji) Vilitati Kautoga	Tavua	5
7	(Fiji) Shahil Dave	Suva	4
7	(Fiji) Samuela Drudru	Lautoka	4
7	(Fiji) Vilive Naulalevu	Tavua	4
