= A.S. Aorai =

Tahitian association football club

AS Aorai
- Full name: Association Sportive Aorai
- Founded: 1960
- Ground: Stade Pater; Papeete, French Polynesia
- Chairman: Patrick Teriierooiterai.
- 2017–18: 8th (relegated)

Association Sportive Aorai, is a football club from Papeete, Tahiti. It's named after the Mont Aorai, the third tallest mountain on the main island of Tahiti. They last competed at Tahiti Ligue 1 in 2017–18.

== Last seasons ==
Season	League/position
2012-13	4th in Ligue 2.
2013-14	6th in Ligue 2.
2014-15	2nd in Ligue 2 - Promoted.
2015-16	8th in Ligue 1 - Relegated. Round 2 of Tahiti Cup.
2016-17	3rd in Ligue 2 - Promoted. Quarter finals of Tahiti Cup.
2017-18	9th in Ligue 1; lost playoff - Relegated. Round 2 of Tahiti Cup.
2018-19	unknown.
2019-20	unknown.
