= Haeke language =

Austronesian language spoken in New Caledonia

Haeke
- Haekic
- Native to: Koné, New Caledonia
- Native speakers: 300 (from 2009 census)
- Language family: Austronesian: Malayo-Polynesian; Oceanic; Southern Oceanic; New Caledonian – Loyalties; New Caledonian; Northern New Caledonian; Haeke

Language codes
- ISO 639-3: aek
- Glottolog: haek1239
- ELP: Haeke

Haeke (’Aeke) is a divergent and nearly extinct indigenous language of New Caledonia, in the commune of Koné.
