= Vuniuci Tikomaimereke =

Fijian footballer

Personal information
- Full name: Vuniuci Tikomaimereke
- Date of birth: 7 June 1990 (age 36)
- Place of birth: Rotuma, Fiji
- Position: Defender

Team information
- Current team: Rewa

Senior career*
| Years | Team | Apps | (Gls) |
| –2017 | Nadi | | |
| 2017– | Rewa | | |

International career
| 2017– | Fiji | 2 | (0) |
Medal record
Men's football
Representing Fiji
Pacific Mini Games
| Silver medal – second place | 2017 Vanuatu |
- * Club domestic league appearances and goals

Vuniuci Tikomaimereke (born 7 June 1990) is a Fijian footballer who mainly plays as a left-back for Fijian club Rewa and the Fiji national team.

== Club career ==
Tikomaimereke started his career with Nadi. In 2017 he moved to Rewa In 2019 he moved to Labasa.

== National team ==
In 2017 Tikomaimereke was called up by coach Christophe Gamel for the Fiji national football team. He made his debut on May 25, 2017, in a 1–1 draw against the Solomon Islands. He played from the start of the game and was subbed after 55 minutes of play for Ilaitia Tuilau.

== Honours ==
Fiji

- Pacific Mini Games: Silver Medalist, 2017
