= 2023 MSG Prime Minister's Cup =

Tournament details
- Host country: New Caledonia
- Cities: Nouméa & Koné
- Dates: 8–15 October
- Teams: 4 (from 1 confederation)
- Venues: 2 (in 2 host cities)

Final positions
- Champions: Solomon Islands (2nd title)
- Runners-up: New Caledonia
- Third place: Vanuatu

Tournament statistics
- Matches played: 6
- Goals scored: 15 (2.5 per match)
- Top scorer(s): (Solomon Islands) Raphael Lea'i (4 goals)

The 2023 MSG Prime Minister's Cup was held from 8–15 October 2023. New Caledonia hosted the competition with matches being played at the Stade Numa-Daly Magenta in Nouméa and the Stade Yoshida in Koné.

Papua New Guinea were defending champions after winning the 2022 edition of the tournament. Regular competitor Fiji did not enter the tournament in order to focus on the 2023 Pacific Games.

The Solomon Islands won the competition for its second-ever title.

== Format ==
The four competing teams faced each other once in a round-robin style tournament. Each team played three matches.

== Table ==
Pos	Team	Pld	W	D	L	GF	GA	GD	Pts
1	Solomon Islands	3	3	0	0	5	1	+4	9
2	New Caledonia (H)	3	2	0	1	7	2	+5	6
3	Vanuatu	3	1	0	2	1	5	−4	3
4	Papua New Guinea	3	0	0	3	2	7	−5	0

Source: Global Sports Archive
(H) Hosts

== Matches ==
8 October 2023
14:00 UTC+11:00

Papua New Guinea	1–3	Solomon Islands
Gunemba 51'	Report	Lea'i 80', 86', 90+3'

Stade Numa-Daly Magenta, Nouméa, New Caledonia
8 October 2023
17:00 UTC+11:00

New Caledonia	4–0	Vanuatu
Bako 37'; Read 44'; Waia 57'; Wawia 85'	Report

Stade Numa-Daly Magenta, Nouméa, New Caledonia
11 October 2023
13:00 UTC+11:00

Solomon Islands	1–0	Vanuatu
Leslie 45+2'	Report

Stade Yoshida, Koné, New Caledonia
11 October 2023
16:00 UTC+11:00

Papua New Guinea	1–3	New Caledonia
Semmy 45+1'	Report	Neoere 40'; Wélépane 51'; Xowi 70'

Stade Yoshida, Koné, New Caledonia
14 October 2023
14:00 UTC+11:00

Papua New Guinea	0–1	Vanuatu
	Report	Mansale 45+1'

Stade Numa-Daly Magenta, Nouméa, New Caledonia
14 October 2023
17:00 UTC+11:00

Solomon Islands	1–0	New Caledonia
Lea'i 75'	Report

Stade Numa-Daly Magenta, Nouméa, New Caledonia

== Statistics ==
=== Goalscorers ===
There were 15 goals scored in 6 matches, for an average of 2.5 goals per match.

4 goals

- (Solomon Islands) Raphael Lea'i

1 goal

- (New Caledonia) Pierre Bako
- (New Caledonia) Roberto Neoere
- (New Caledonia) Willy Read
- (New Caledonia) Gerard Waia
- (New Caledonia) Pierre Wawia
- (New Caledonia) Shene Wélépane
- (New Caledonia) Makalu Xowi
- (Papua New Guinea) Raymond Gunemba
- (Papua New Guinea) Tommy Semmy
- (Solomon Islands) Bobby Leslie
- (Vanuatu) Barry Mansale
