= Jay Warren (footballer) =

Tahitian footballer (born 1989)

Personal information
- Date of birth: 4 May 1989 (age 37)
- Place of birth: Tahiti
- Position: Midfielder

Senior career*
Years	Team	Apps	(Gls)
2009–2010	A.S. Pirae		
2010–2013	A.S. Dragon		
2013–2022	A.S. Pirae		

International career^{‡}
2009	Tahiti U20	3	(0)
2010–	Tahiti	3	(0)
- * Club domestic league appearances and goals as of 23 June 2016 ‡ National team caps and goals as of 23 June 2016

Jay Warren (born 4 May 1989) is a Tahitian footballer who plays as a midfielder for A.S. Pirae in the Tahiti Ligue 1.
