= Yann Pennequin-Le Bras =

Footballer (born 1994)

Personal information
- Date of birth: 10 January 1994 (age 32)
- Position: Midfielder

Team information
- Current team: Vénus

Youth career
- Brest

Senior career*
Years	Team	Apps	(Gls)
2017–	Vénus		

International career
2022–	Tahiti	1	(0)
- * Club domestic league appearances and goals

Yann Pennequin-Le Bras (born 10 January 1994) is a footballer who plays as a midfielder for Vénus. Born in France, he is a Tahiti international.

== Career ==
In 2017, he signed for Tahitian side Vénus, helping them win the league.
