= Stade Yoshida =

- Interactive map of Stade Yoshida
- Full name: Stade Lucien Yoshida
- Location: Rue Henri Marlier, Koné
- Coordinates: 21°03′17″S 164°51′24″E
- Capacity: 3,000
- Surface: Grass

Tenants
- JS Baco; New Caledonia national football team (select matches)

Stade Yoshida is an association football stadium in Koné, the capital of New Caledonia's North Province.

== Events ==
The stadium has hosted major football competitions at both the club and international level, including the 2018 OFC Women's Nations Cup, 2019 OFC Champions League and the 2023 MSG Prime Minister's Cup.
