= Tyrell Baringer-Tahiri =

Cook Islands footballer

Personal information
- Full name: Tyrell Baringer-Tahiri
- Date of birth: 20 April 1994 (age 32)
- Place of birth: Dunedin, New Zealand
- Height: 1.85 m (6 ft 1 in)
- Position: Defender

Team information
- Current team: Kiwi FC Wimbledon

Youth career
- 2013–2014: Southern United

Senior career*
Years	Team	Apps	(Gls)
2012	Grants Braes	16	(2)
2014–2016	Roslyn-Wakari	43	(1)
2015-2016	Southern United		(0)
2016-2017	Tasman United		
2017	Puaikura FC		
2017	Bay Olympic		
2017-2018	Tupapa Maraerenga		
2021-2025	AFC South London		
2025-	Kiwi FC Wimbledon	1	(0)

International career^{‡}
2011	Cook Islands U17	4	(2)
2015–	Cook Islands	3	(0)
- * Club domestic league appearances and goals ‡ National team caps and goals as of 10 September 2015

Tyrell Baringer-Tahiri (born 20 April 1994) is a Cook Islands footballer who plays as a defender for Kiwi FC Wimbledon in the English 14th division and the Cook Islands national football team. He made his debut for the national team on 31 August 2015 in a 3–0 win against Tonga.

Baringer-Tahiri was educated at Otago Boys' High School. After playing for Southern United in the youth league, in 2016 he switched to Tasman United. In 2019 he played for Tupapa Maraerenga F.C. in the 2019 OFC Champions League.

In March 2022 he was named to the Cook Islands squad for the Oceania FIFA World Cup 2022.
