= Gordshem Dona =

Vanuatuan footballer

Personal information
- Full name: Godshen Gordshem Sahtjen Donna Dona
- Date of birth: 27 August 1996 (age 30)
- Place of birth: Vanuatu
- Position: Defender

Team information
- Current team: Malampa Revivors

Youth career
- –2013: Teouma Academy

Senior career*
Years	Team	Apps	(Gls)
2013–2014	Yatel		
2014–2018	Amicale		
2018–	Erakor Golden Star		
2019–	Malampa Revivors		

International career^{‡}
2013	Vanuatu U17	4	(0)
2014	Vanuatu U20	4	(0)
2017–	Vanuatu	9	(0)
Medal record
Men's football
Representing Vanuatu
Pacific Mini Games
Gold medal – first place	2017 Vanuatu
- * Club domestic league appearances and goals ‡ National team caps and goals as of 31 July 2019

Gordshem Dona, sometimes written Goshen, Godshen or Donna (born 27 August 1996) is a Vanuatuan footballer who plays as a defender for Vanuatuan club Malampa Revivors and the Vanuatu national team.

== Club career ==
Donna started his career with the Teouma Academy, the national academy of Vanuatu. He started his career with Yatel and after one season he joined Vanuatuan top outfit Amicale.

== International career ==
In 2017 Donna was called up for the Vanuatu national football team. He made his debut on November 23, 2017, in a 1–0 loss against Estonia when he played the whole 90 minutes.

== Honours ==
Vanuatu

- Pacific Mini Games: Gold Medalist, 2017
