= Ilaitia Tuilau =

Fijian footballer

Personal information
- Full name: Ilaitia Tuilau
- Date of birth: 8 May 1987 (age 39)
- Place of birth: Fiji
- Positions: Defender; midfielder

Team information
- Current team: Lautoka

Senior career*
Years	Team	Apps	(Gls)
–2011	Lautoka		
2011–2012	Labasa		
2012–2013	Hekari United		
2013–2016	Amicale		
2016–	Lautoka		

International career
2008–	Fiji	14	(0)
Medal record
Men's football
Representing Fiji
Pacific Mini Games
Silver medal – second place	2017 Vanuatu
- * Club domestic league appearances and goals

Ilaitia Tuilau, sometimes spelled Laitia, (born 8 May 1987) is a Fijian footballer who can play as a defender as well as a defensive midfielder plays for Fijian club Lautoka and the Fiji national team.

== Club career ==
Tuilau started his career with Lautoka. After a few years he joined Lautoka for a short stint. After that he went on to Papua New Guinea and Vanuatu to play OFC Champions League football with Hekari United and Amicale. In 2016 he returned home to play for his first club: Lautoka.

== National team ==
Tuilau made his debut for the Fiji national football team at the age of 21 in a 2-0 win against New Zealand on November 19, 2008. After this he didn't play for the squad for almost three years. In 2011 he was called up again for the 2011 Pacific Games where he played four games. After this games it took five years before he was called up again. Now for a friendly game against Malaysia. Since then he has got regular call ups for the national team.

== Honours ==
Fiji

- Pacific Mini Games: Silver Medalist, 2017
