= Renzo Wéjième =

New Caledonian footballer (born 1999)

Personal information
- Full name: Renzo Auguste Wéjième
- Date of birth: 9 September 1999 (age 27)
- Place of birth: New Caledonia
- Position: Midfielder

Team information
- Current team: AS Magenta
- Number: 18

Senior career*
Years	Team	Apps	(Gls)
2015–2017	OMS Paita		
2017–	AS Magenta		

International career
2015	New Caledonia U17	6	(3)
2016–	New Caledonia U20	3	(0)
2017–	New Caledonia	4	(0)
- * Club domestic league appearances and goals

Renzo Wéjième (born 9 September 1999) is a New Caledonian footballer who plays as a midfielder for New Caledonian club AS Magenta, New Caledonia under-20 and the New Caledonian national team.

== Club career ==
Wéjième started his career in the youth of OMS Paita. In 2015 he moved to the first team and made his debut. In 2017 he moved to New Caledonian powerhouse AS Magenta.

== National team ==
In 2017 Wéjième was called up by François Tartas for the New Caledonia national football team to play at the 2017 Pacific Mini Games. He made his debut on December 2, 2017, in a 2–1 loss against Vanuatu where he played the whole 90 minutes.
