= Pothin Poma =

Tahitian footballer (born 1997)

Personal information
- Full name: Pothin Terry James Tein Poma
- Date of birth: 13 December 1997 (age 28)
- Place of birth: Ponérihouen, New Caledonia
- Height: 1.90 m (6 ft 3 in)
- Position: Defensive midfielder

Team information
- Current team: Tahiti United
- Number: 5

Senior career*
Years	Team	Apps	(Gls)
2015–2018	Hienghène Sport		
2018–2026	Vénus		
2026–	Tahiti United	1	(0)

International career^{‡}
2016	New Caledonia U20	4	(1)
2017	New Caledonia U23	2	(0)
2017	New Caledonia	3	(0)
2024–	Tahiti	5	(0)
Medal record
Men's football
Representing Tahiti
OFC Nations Cup
Third place	2024 Fiji/Vanuatu
- * Club domestic league appearances and goals ‡ National team caps and goals as of 21 March 2025

Pothin Terry James Tein Poma (born 13 December 1997) is a footballer who plays as a defensive midfielder for OFC Pro League club Tahiti United. Born in New Caledonia, he plays for the Tahiti national team.

Poma represented New Caledonia internationally at both youth and senior levels prior to 2017. In 2024, he switched his national allegiance to Tahiti, which he represented at the 2024 OFC Men's Nations Cup.

== Club career ==
Born in Ponérihouen, New Caledonia, Poma started his career in the youth of Hienghène Sport. In 2015, he moved to the first team and made his debut. In 2018, he moved to Vénus in Tahiti.

== National team ==
=== New Caledonia ===
In 2017, Poma was called up for the New Caledonia national team. He made his debut on 26 November 2017 in a 1–1 draw against Estonia, coming on as a substitute for Joseph Tchako in the 80th minute.

=== Tahiti ===
In 2024, after five years residency in French Polynesia, Poma became eligible to represent Tahiti and changed his national allegiance and made himself available for the team. He was named in Tahiti national team's squad for the 2024 OFC Men's Nations Cup. He made his debut with Tahiti on 22 June 2024, in the OFC Men's Nations Cup group stage game against Fiji. He played full 90 minutes and was named as the "man of the match" although his team lost 0–1.

== Honours ==
Tahiti

- OFC Nations Cup third place: 2024

== See also ==
- List of association footballers who have been capped for two senior national teams
