= Mickaël Ulile =

New Caledonian footballer (born 1997)

Personal information
- Full name: Mickaël Hnemun Ulile
- Date of birth: 16 July 1997 (age 29)
- Place of birth: New Caledonia
- Position: Goalkeeper

Team information
- Current team: Magenta

Senior career*
Years	Team	Apps	(Gls)
2015–2017	Gaïtcha FCN		
2017–2018	Magenta		
2018–2021	Abbeville		
2021–	Magenta		

International career^{‡}
2016	New Caledonia U20	4	(0)
2016–	New Caledonia	13	(0)
Medal record
Men's football
Representing New Caledonia
Pacific Games
Gold medal – first place	2023 Solomon Islands
Silver medal – second place	2019 Samoa
MSG Prime Minister's Cup
Runner-up	2023 New Caledonia
- * Club domestic league appearances and goals as of 25 February 2017 ‡ National team caps and goals as of 31 July 2019

Mickaël Ulile (born 16 July 1997) is a New Caledonian professional footballer who plays as a goalkeeper for Magenta. He made his debut for the national team on 8 October 2016 in their 1–0 win against the Solomon Islands.

== Honours ==
New Caledonia

- Pacific Games: Gold Medalist, 2023; Silver Medalist, 2019
- MSG Prime Minister's Cup: Runner-up, 2023
