= Shene Wélépane =

New Caledonian footballer (born 1997)

Shene Welepane
Personal information
- Full name: Shene Welepane
- Date of birth: 9 December 1997 (age 28)
- Place of birth: New Caledonia
- Position: Midfielder

Team information
- Current team: Magenta
- Number: 8

Senior career*
Years	Team	Apps	(Gls)
- Magenta

International career^{‡}
2016	New Caledonia U20	4	(0)
2017–	New Caledonia	17	(6)
Medal record
Men's football
Representing New Caledonia
Pacific Games
Gold medal – first place	2023 Solomon Islands
MSG Prime Minister's Cup
Runner-up	2023 New Caledonia
- * Club domestic league appearances and goals ‡ National team caps and goals as of 2 December 2023

Shene Welepane (born 9 December 1997) is a New Caledonian footballer who plays as a midfielder for Magenta in the New Caledonia Super Ligue and the New Caledonia national football team. He made his debut for the national team on June 7, 2017 in a 2–2 draw against Fiji.

== International career ==
=== International goals ===
Scores and results list New Caledonia's goal tally first.

No	Date	Venue	Opponent	Score	Result	Competition
1.	2 December 2017	Port Vila Municipal Stadium, Port Vila, Vanuatu	Vanuatu	1–1	1–2	2017 Pacific Mini Games
2.	5 December 2017	Korman Stadium, Port Vila, Vanuatu	Tuvalu	1–2	1–2	2017 Pacific Mini Games
3.	15 December 2017	Port Vila Stadium, Port Vila, Vanuatu	Fiji	1–2	1–4	2017 Pacific Mini Games
4.	11 October 2023	Stade Yoshida, Koné, New Caledonia	Papua New Guinea	2–1	3–1	2023 MSG Prime Minister's Cup
5.	18 November 2023	SIFF Academy Field, Honiara, Solomon Islands	Tonga	4–0	7–0	2023 Pacific Games
6.	2 December 2023	National Stadium, Honiara, Solomon Islands	Solomon Islands	2–1	2–2 (p. 7–6)	2023 Pacific Games

== Honours ==
New Caledonia

- Pacific Games: Gold Medalist, 2023
- MSG Prime Minister's Cup: Runner-up, 2023
