= Dominique Wel =

New Caledonian footballer (born 1997)

Personal information
- Date of birth: 16 June 1997 (age 29)
- Position: Defender

Team information
- Current team: AS Métropole

Senior career*
Years	Team	Apps	(Gls)
2017–	AS Métropole		

International career^{‡}
2017–	New Caledonia	5	(0)
- * Club domestic league appearances and goals as of 13:04, 6 July 2018 (UTC) ‡ National team caps and goals as of 13:04, 6 July 2018 (UTC)

Dominique Wel (born 16 June 1997) is a New Caledonian international footballer who plays as a defender for New Caledonia Super Ligue side AS Métropole.

== Career statistics ==
=== International ===
As of matches played 6 July 2018.

National team	Year	Apps	Goals
New Caledonia	2017	5	0
New Caledonia	2018	0	0
Total		5	0
