= Jean Baptiste Waitreü =

New Caledonian footballer (born 1997)

Personal information
- Full name: Jean Baptiste Weda Waitreü
- Date of birth: 23 January 1997 (age 29)
- Position: Forward

Team information
- Current team: Gaïtcha FCN

Senior career*
Years	Team	Apps	(Gls)
2015–	Gaïtcha FCN		

International career^{‡}
2016	New Caledonia U20	2	(0)
2017–	New Caledonia	4	(1)
- * Club domestic league appearances and goals as of 13:04, 6 July 2018 (UTC) ‡ National team caps and goals as of 13:04, 6 July 2018 (UTC)

Jean Baptiste Waitreü (born 23 January 1997) is a New Caledonian international footballer who plays as a forward for New Caledonia Super Ligue side Gaïtcha FCN.

== Career statistics ==
=== International ===
As of matches played 6 July 2018.

National team	Year	Apps	Goals
New Caledonia	2017	4	1
New Caledonia	2018	0	0
Total		4	1

=== International goals ===
Scores and results list New Caledonia's goal tally first.

No	Date	Venue	Opponent	Score	Result	Competition
1.	9 December 2017	Port Vila Municipal Stadium, Port Vila, Vanuatu	Tonga	3–1	4–2	2017 Pacific Mini Games
