= Sylvain Graglia =

French association football player (born 1989)

Personal information
- Date of birth: 12 April 1989 (age 37)
- Place of birth: Cannes, France
- Position: Striker

Team information
- Current team: A.S. Pirae

Youth career
- 2008–2009: AS Cannes
- 2009–2011: FC Antibes

Senior career*
Years	Team	Apps	(Gls)
2012–2014	A.S. Dragon		
2015–2017	A.S. Tefana		
2017–?	A.S. Central Sport		(22)
?	AS Samine		
2020-	A.S. Pirae		

International career^{‡}
2016–	Tahiti	4	(2)
- * Club domestic league appearances and goals ‡ National team caps and goals as of 21:02, 29 March 2017 (UTC)

Sylvain Graglia (born 12 April 1989) is a French-born Tahitian footballer who plays as a striker for A.S. Pirae and the Tahiti national football team.

== Personal ==
Graglia is from Cannes in France. He moved to Tahiti in 2011 when his wife, who is a nurse, transferred to a French Polynesian hospital.

== Career ==
=== Youth ===
As a youth, Graglia played for FC Antibes and trained with AS Cannes.

=== Club ===
Between 2012 and 2014, Graglia played for A.S. Dragon of Tahiti Ligue 1. He competed in the 2012–13 OFC Champions League with the club and scored in a victory against Auckland City. Following his tenure with Dragon, he transferred to fellow-Ligue 1 side A.S. Tefana. With Tefana, he competed in 2014–15 Coupe de France and scored in a seventh round 1–2 defeat to Olympique Noisy-le-Sec. He also competed with the club in the 2017 OFC Champions League and scored in a 4–2 victory over Erakor Golden Star F.C. of Vanuatu. He has also played in Tahiti for AS Samine.

He is part of the squad of A.S. Pirae at 2021´s FIFA Club World Cup.

== International career ==
After living in Tahiti for five years beginning in 2011, Graglia became eligible to represent Tahiti. He made his senior international debut on 7 November 2016 in a 2018 FIFA World Cup qualification match against the Solomon Islands. He scored his first two international goals in a 3–1 victory over Papua New Guinea in the same competition on 23 March 2017.

=== International goals ===
Score and result list Tahiti's goal tally first.

#	Date	Venue	Opponent	Score	Result	Competition
1	23 March 2017	Sir John Guise Stadium, Port Moresby, Papua New Guinea	Papua New Guinea	1–1	3–1	2018 FIFA World Cup qualification
2	23 March 2017	Sir John Guise Stadium, Port Moresby, Papua New Guinea	Papua New Guinea	2–1	3–1	2018 FIFA World Cup qualification
Last updated 26 March 2017

=== International statistics ===
As of match played 28 March 2017

Tahiti
Year	Apps	Goals
2016	2	0
2017	2	2
Total	4	2
