= Gaétan Gope-Iwate =

New Caledonian footballer (born 1998)

Personal information
- Full name: Gaétan Herman Herman Gope-Iwate
- Date of birth: 5 October 1998 (age 28)
- Place of birth: New Caledonia
- Positions: Defender; midfielder

Team information
- Current team: Magenta
- Number: 2

Senior career*
| Years | Team | Apps | (Gls) |
| 2015–2017 | FC Auteuil-Dumbea | | |
| 2017–2019 | AS Wetr | | |
| 2019– | Magenta | | |

International career^{‡}
| 2016 | New Caledonia U20 | 3 | (0) |
| 2017 | New Caledonia | 8 | (2) |
- * Club domestic league appearances and goals ‡ National team caps and goals as of 28 March 2025

Gaétan Gope-Iwate, sometimes spelled Gaéton, (born 5 October 1998) is a New Caledonian footballer who plays as a defender for New Caledonian club Magenta and the New Caledonian national team.

== Club career ==
Gope-Iwate started his career in the youth of FC Auteuil-Dumbea. In 2015 he moved to the first team and made his debut. In 2017 he moved to New Caledonian powerhouse AS Wetr.

== International career ==
In 2017 Gope-Iwate was called up by François Tartas for the New Caledonia national football team to play at the 2017 Pacific Mini Games. He made his debut on December 2, 2017, in a 2–1 loss against Vanuatu where he played the whole 90 minutes. So far, Gope-Iwate scored two goals for the national team. He scored those two goals on December 9, 2017 in a 4-2 victory over Tonga.

== Career statistics ==
=== International ===
Appearances and goals by national team and year
| National team | Year | Apps | Goals |
|---|---|---|---|
| New Caledonia | 2017 | 4 | 2 |
| New Caledonia | 2018 | 2 | 0 |
| New Caledonia | 2019 | 2 | 0 |
| Total | | 8 | 2 |

Scores and results list New Caledonia's goal tally first, score column indicates score after each Gope-Iwate goal.

List of international goals scored by Gaétan Gope-Iwate
| No. | Date | Venue | Opponent | Score | Result | Competition | Ref. |
|---|---|---|---|---|---|---|---|
| 1 | 8 December 2017 | Port Vila Municipal Stadium, Port Vila, Vanuatu | Tonga | 1–0 | 4–2 | 2017 Pacific Mini Games | |
| 2 | 8 December 2017 | Port Vila Municipal Stadium, Port Vila, Vanuatu | Tonga | 4–2 | 4–2 | 2017 Pacific Mini Games | |
