= Kevin Nemia =

New Caledonian footballer (born 1989)

Personal information
- Full name: Kevin Nemia
- Date of birth: 31 July 1989 (age 37)
- Place of birth: New Caledonia
- Position: Forward

Team information
- Current team: AS Magenta

Senior career*
Years	Team	Apps	(Gls)
2016–	AS Magenta		(16)

International career^{‡}
2016–	New Caledonia	2	(1)
- * Club domestic league appearances and goals as of 01:41, 2 June 2016 (UTC) ‡ National team caps and goals as of 01:41, 2 June 2016 (UTC)

Kevin Nemia (born 31 July 1989) is a New Caledonian footballer who plays for AS Magenta.

== International career ==
=== International goals ===
Scores and results list New Caledonia's goal tally first.

No	Date	Venue	Opponent	Score	Result	Competition
1.	1 June 2016	Sir John Guise Stadium, Port Moresby, Papua New Guinea	Samoa	2–0	7–0	2016 OFC Nations Cup
