= Koné, New Caledonia =

Commune of New Caledonia

Koné
- Commune
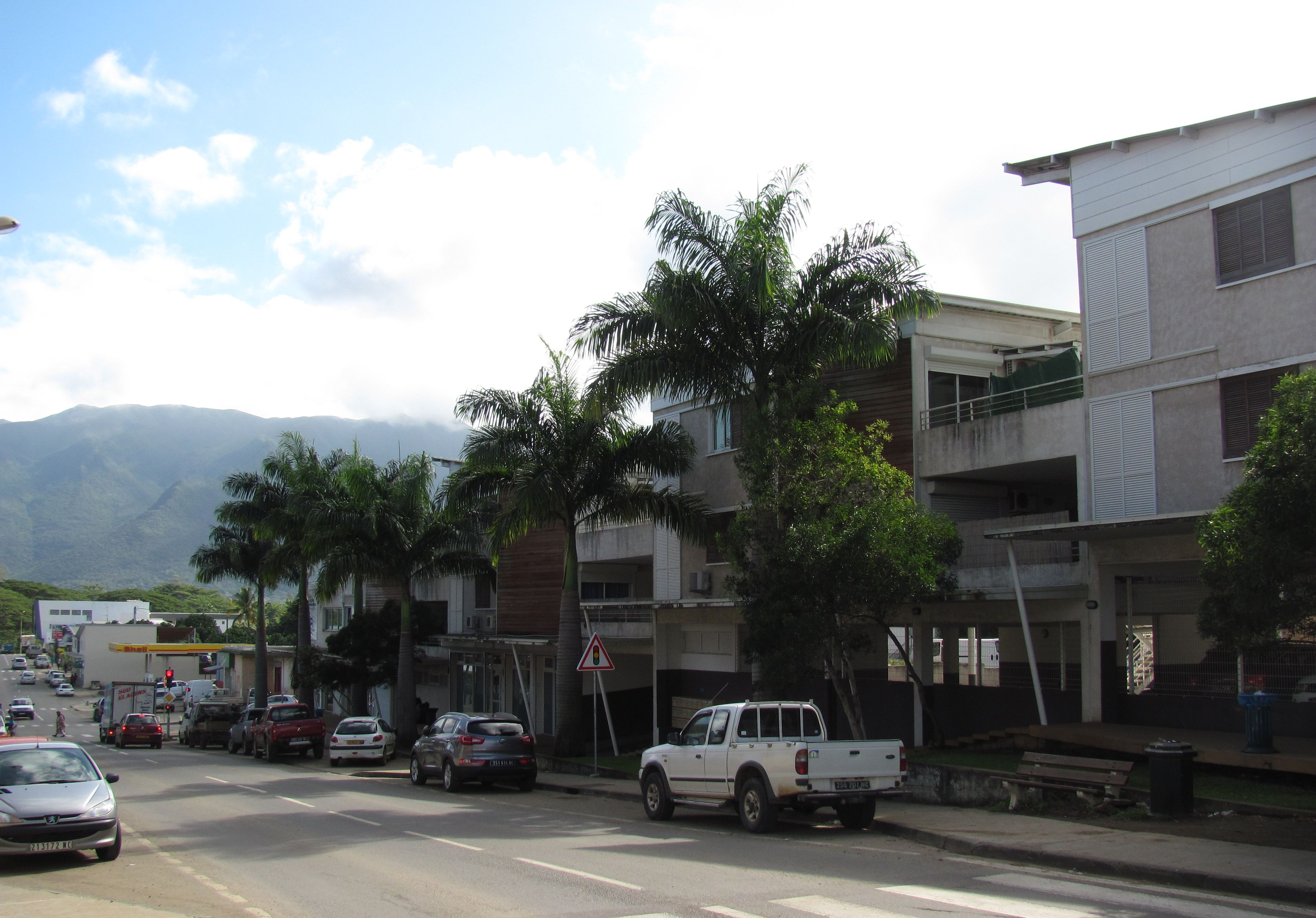
- The main road in the centre of Koné

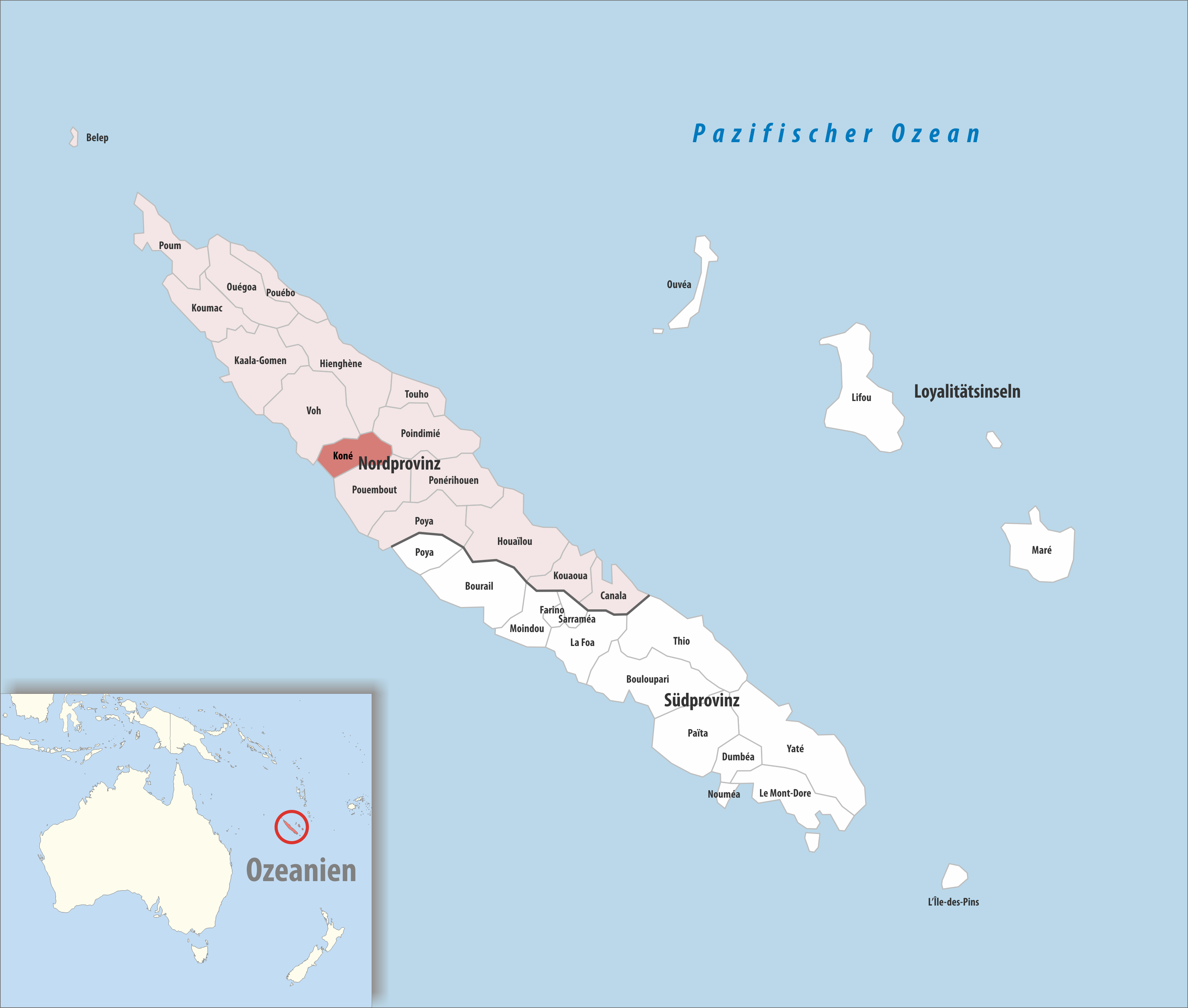
- Location of the commune (in red) within New Caledonia
- Location of Koné
- Coordinates: 21°03′32″S 164°51′06″E
- Country: France
- Sui generis collectivity: New Caledonia
- Province: North Province

Government
  - Mayor (2020–2026): Thierry Gowecee
- Area^{1}: 373.6 km^{2} (144.2 sq mi)
- Elevation: 10 m (33 ft)
- Highest elevation: 1,014 m (3,327 ft)
- Lowest elevation: 0 m (0 ft)
- Population (2019 census): 8,144
  - Density: 21.80/km^{2} (56.46/sq mi)

Ethnic distribution
  - 2019 census: Kanaks 57.75% Europeans 14.35% Wallisians and Futunans 1.78% Mixed 12.71% Other 13.41%
- Time zone: UTC+11:00
- INSEE/Postal code: 98811 /98860
- ^{1} New Caledonia Land Register (DITTT) data, which exclude lakes and ponds larger than 1 km² (0.386 sq mi or 247 acres) as well as the estuaries of rivers.

Koné (French: [kɔne], Haeke: Koohnê) is a commune in the North Province of New Caledonia, a special collectivity of France in the Pacific Ocean. Koné is the provincial seat of the North Province.

== Geography ==
=== Climate ===
Koné has a tropical savanna climate (Köppen climate classification Aw). The average annual temperature in Koné is 23.7 °C (74.7 °F). The average annual rainfall is 1,034.7 mm (40.74 in) with February as the wettest month. The temperatures are highest on average in February, at around 27.3 °C (81.1 °F), and lowest in July, at around 19.8 °C (67.6 °F). The highest temperature ever recorded in Koné was 38.5 °C (101.3 °F) on 12 February 1954; the coldest temperature ever recorded was 6.2 °C (43.2 °F) on 21 July 1997.

Climate data for Koné (1991−2020 normals, extremes 1952−present)
Month	Jan	Feb	Mar	Apr	May	Jun	Jul	Aug	Sep	Oct	Nov	Dec	Year
Record high °C (°F)	37.8 (100.0)	38.5 (101.3)	36.9 (98.4)	36.8 (98.2)	34.0 (93.2)	33.5 (92.3)	32.1 (89.8)	32.5 (90.5)	35.2 (95.4)	37.2 (99.0)	37.5 (99.5)	38.2 (100.8)	38.5 (101.3)
Mean daily maximum °C (°F)	31.6 (88.9)	31.8 (89.2)	31.0 (87.8)	29.6 (85.3)	27.7 (81.9)	26.1 (79.0)	25.2 (77.4)	25.5 (77.9)	27.0 (80.6)	28.6 (83.5)	29.9 (85.8)	31.1 (88.0)	28.8 (83.8)
Daily mean °C (°F)	26.9 (80.4)	27.3 (81.1)	26.6 (79.9)	25.0 (77.0)	22.8 (73.0)	21.1 (70.0)	19.8 (67.6)	20.0 (68.0)	21.0 (69.8)	22.9 (73.2)	24.5 (76.1)	26.1 (79.0)	23.7 (74.7)
Mean daily minimum °C (°F)	22.2 (72.0)	22.8 (73.0)	22.2 (72.0)	20.3 (68.5)	17.9 (64.2)	16.1 (61.0)	14.4 (57.9)	14.4 (57.9)	15.1 (59.2)	17.3 (63.1)	19.1 (66.4)	21.1 (70.0)	18.6 (65.5)
Record low °C (°F)	15.0 (59.0)	15.5 (59.9)	14.0 (57.2)	11.5 (52.7)	8.2 (46.8)	6.3 (43.3)	6.2 (43.2)	6.8 (44.2)	7.0 (44.6)	8.2 (46.8)	10.6 (51.1)	12.0 (53.6)	6.2 (43.2)
Average precipitation mm (inches)	135.9 (5.35)	186.4 (7.34)	178.9 (7.04)	81.5 (3.21)	71.7 (2.82)	73.4 (2.89)	49.7 (1.96)	50.0 (1.97)	31.2 (1.23)	29.7 (1.17)	48.9 (1.93)	97.4 (3.83)	1,034.7 (40.74)
Average precipitation days (≥ 1.0 mm)	9.0	10.8	10.7	7.1	6.0	5.6	5.2	4.6	3.0	3.4	4.4	8.2	78.0
Source: Météo-France

== Politics and regional development ==
Koné is the seat of the government of the Northern Province, dominated since the Province was established by pro-Independence politicians. The aim has been to develop Koné and neighbouring towns into an economic growth pole, anchored by the large Koniambo project and nickel mine. The idea has been to give Kanak peoples job opportunities independent from France and the loyalist Southern Province. This 'VKP' zone is now established, with a marked increase in business activity, construction, and public facilities (library, cinema, swimming pool) since the mid 2000s.
