= 2026–27 Tahiti Ligue 1 =

Football league season in French Polynesia

Tahiti Ligue 1
- Season: 2026–27
- Top goalscorer: Roonui Tinirauarii (18 goals)

The 2026–27 Tahiti Ligue 1 was the 80th season of Tahiti Ligue 1, the top-league in Tahitian Football Federation.

There will be 16 teams that will play 15 (1 against each other) games each.

== New format ==
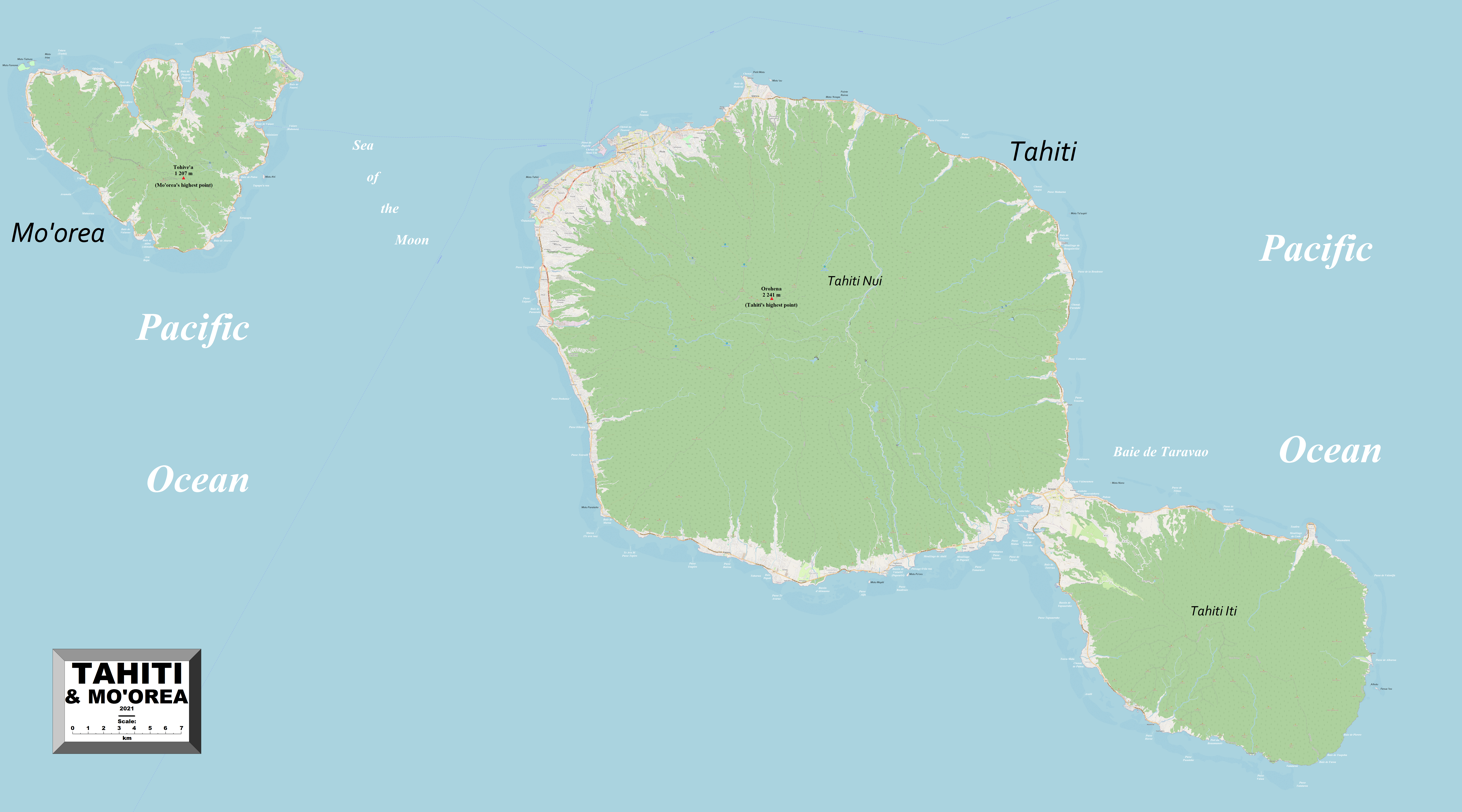
Locations of the all teams to will be competete 2026–27 Tahiti Ligue 1 in Tahiti, and Moorea islands.

== Teams ==
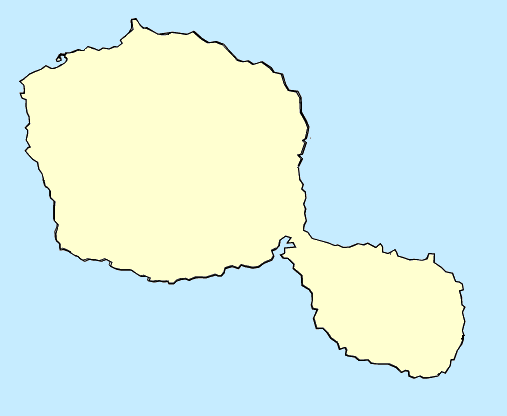
Locations of the 2026–27 Tahiti Ligue 1 teams

=== Stadium and locations ===
Note: Table lists in alphabetical order.

Team	City	Stadium	Capacity

=== Personnel and sponsoring ===
Note: Flags indicate national team as has been defined under FIFA eligibility rules. Players may hold more than one non-FIFA nationality.

Team	Head coach	Captain	Kit manufacturer	Main sponsor

== League table ==
Pos	Team	Pld	W	D	L	GF	GA	GD	Pts	Qualification or relegation
1	Jeunes Tahitiens	0	0	0	0	0	0	0	0	Advance to Championship round
2	Pueu	0	0	0	0	0	0	0	0	Advance to Championship round
3	Vénus	0	0	0	0	0	0	0	0	Advance to Championship round
4	Tefana II	0	0	0	0	0	0	0	0	Advance to Championship round
5	Tefana	0	0	0	0	0	0	0	0	Advance to Championship round
6	Dragon	0	0	0	0	0	0	0	0	Advance to Championship round
7	Tamarii Punaruu	0	0	0	0	0	0	0	0	Advance to Championship round
8	Central Sport	0	0	0	0	0	0	0	0	Advance to Championship round
9	Pirae	0	0	0	0	0	0	0	0	Relegated to Tahiti Ligue 2
10	Excelsior	0	0	0	0	0	0	0	0	Relegated to Tahiti Ligue 2
11	Arue	0	0	0	0	0	0	0	0	Relegated to Tahiti Ligue 2
12	Tamarii Punaruu II	0	0	0	0	0	0	0	0	Relegated to Tahiti Ligue 2
13	Taiarapu	0	0	0	0	0	0	0	0	Relegated to Tahiti Ligue 2
14	Central Sport II	0	0	0	0	0	0	0	0	Relegated to Tahiti Ligue 2
15	Mataiea	0	0	0	0	0	0	0	0	Relegated to Tahiti Ligue 2
16	Manu-Ura	0	0	0	0	0	0	0	0	Relegated to Tahiti Ligue 2

Updated to match(es) played on unknown. Source: FootyStats

== Results ==
=== Regular season ===
Home \ Away	ARU	CEN	DRA	EXC	JEU	MAN	MAT	PIR	PUE	PUN	TAI	TEF	VEN	CEN2	TEF2	PUN2
Arue					0–3				0–2				1–12		0–6	
Central Sport																
Dragon		2–3									3–0					
Excelsior	0–0	1–4	0–21					0–1			4–0					2–2
Jeunes Tahitiens						18–0									1–1	
Manu-Ura		0–10	2–19							0–3		0–20	0–16			
Mataiea	0–3	1–7	0–22								3–4		0–18	4–0		
Pirae					1–3	3–0				3–3				3–3		
Pueu		5–3						3–0		3–3	9–0					5–0
Tamarii Punaruu					3–5										1–1	
Taiarapu													0–15		1–12	
Tefana	18–0	6–1	2–1										1–3			
Vénus		3–0	4–3													
Central Sport II				0–3	1–6				3–4	0–7					0–10	
Tefana II																
Tamarii Punaruu II					0–9					1–5					0–6	

Source: Sofascore FootyStats
Legend: Blue = home team win; Yellow = draw; Red = away team win.

== Ligue 2 Moorea ==
Ligue 2 Moorea
- Season: 2026–27

=== Teams ===
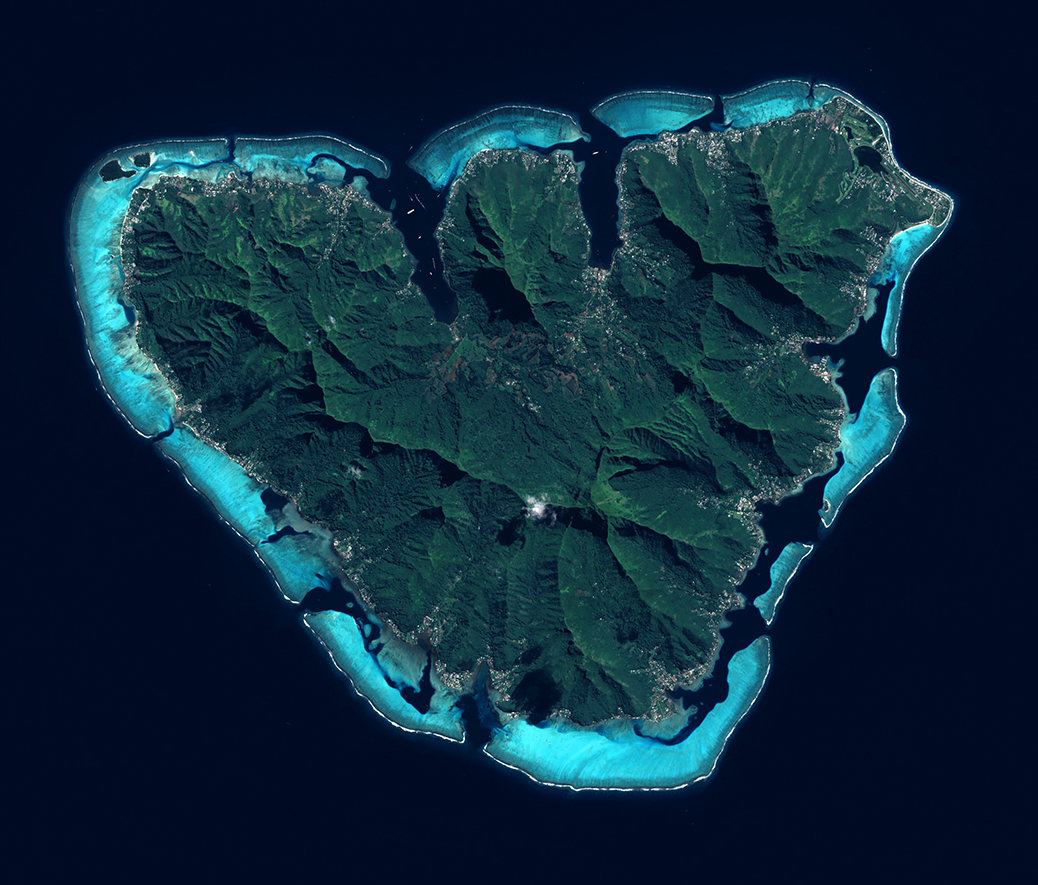
Locations of the 2026–27 Ligue 2 Moorea teams

==== Stadium and locations ====
Note: Table lists in alphabetical order.

Team	City	Stadium	Capacity

==== Personnel and sponsoring ====
Note: Flags indicate national team as has been defined under FIFA eligibility rules. Players may hold more than one non-FIFA nationality.

Team	Head coach	Captain	Kit manufacturer	Main sponsor

==== League table ====
Pos	Team	Pld	W	D	L	GF	GA	GD	Pts	Qualification
1	Tiare Tahiti	0	0	0	0	0	0	0	0	Qualification to Super Ligue
2	Tohie'a	0	0	0	0	0	0	0	0	Qualification to Super Ligue
3	Mira	0	0	0	0	0	0	0	0	
4	Tamarii Tapuhute	0	0	0	0	0	0	0	0	
5	Tiare Anani	0	0	0	0	0	0	0	0	
6	Tiare Hinano	0	0	0	0	0	0	0	0	
7	Tamarii Temanava	0	0	0	0	0	0	0	0	
8	Tahatiri	0	0	0	0	0	0	0	0	

Updated to match(es) played on unknown. Source: Sofascore Fédération Tahitienne de Football

==== Results ====
Home \ Away	MIR	THT	TTA	TEM	TAN	THI	TIA	TOH
Mira		12–1	1–1	3–0		2–0		
Tahatiri			1–3			1–3	0–9	
Tamarii Tapuhute				6–2	2–3		1–2	
Tamarii Temanava		5–1			0–2		0–2	0–3 (Note: Awarded 0–3)
Tiare Anani	2–2	4–0	0–1					0–3
Tiare Hinano					1–1			0–2
Tiare Tahiti	2–1				3–0	3–0		
Tohie'a	5–3	10–1	5–1				3–0	

Source: Sofascore Fédération Tahitienne de Football
Legend: Blue = home team win; Yellow = draw; Red = away team win.

== Ligue Féminin D1 ==
Ligue Féminin D1
- Season: 2026–27
- Champions: Pirae
- Top goalscorer: Emma Bunnaffoux (27 goal)

=== League table ===
Pos	Team	Pld	W	D	L	GF	GA	GD	Pts
1	Pirae	6	6	0	0	76	2	+74	24
2	Jeunes Tahitiens	6	6	0	0	42	3	+39	24
3	Dragon	6	4	0	2	44	8	+36	18
4	Tefana	6	4	0	2	17	20	−3	18
5	Teuaituta	5	1	0	4	5	30	−25	8
6	Papara	5	1	0	4	6	35	−29	8
7	Tamarii Tapuhute	6	0	0	6	1	54	−53	6
8	Tahatiri	6	0	0	6	0	39	−39	6

Updated to match(es) played on unknown. Source:

=== Top goalscorer ===
Rank	Player	Team	Goals
1	Emma Bunnaffoux	Pirae	27
2	Charlotte Rodriguez	Pirae	19
3	Daphne Albrecht	Dragon	16
3	Omega Chalons	Jeunes Tahitiens	16
5	Jessy Samin	Tefana	11
6	Ane Sitter	Pirae	9
7	Eva Le Gayic	Jeunes Tahitiens	8
8	Ninavea Hioe	Jeunes Tahitiens	7
9	Gelima El Hadj	Dragon	6
9	Laelia Petit	Pirae	6
9	Kohai Mai	Jeunes Tahitiens	6

== Top scorers ==
=== Tahiti Ligue 1 ===
Rank	Player	Team	Goals
1	(French Polynesia) Roonui Tinirauarii	Dragon	18
2	(New Caledonia) Makalu Xowi	Dragon	16
3	(French Polynesia) Rayan Oue	Dragon	16
4	(French Polynesia) Lucas Albert	Vénus	15
5	(French Polynesia) Teaonui Tehau	Vénus	14
6	(French Polynesia) Manatteo Pittman	Tefana	12
7	(New Caledonia) Germain Haewegene	Vénus	10
8	(French Polynesia) Francois Mu	Tefana 2	10
9	(French Polynesia) Gervais Chan Kat	Dragon	8
10	(French Polynesia) Frank Papaura	Pue	8

Most goals scored by a player in a single game

- 9 goals.
  - Roonui Tinirauarii (Dragon) 0-22 against Mataiea (19 September 2026).

=== Ligue 2 Moorea ===
Rank	Player	Team	Goals

== Multiple hat-tricks ==
=== Tahiti Ligue 1 ===
- 53 multiple hat-tricks there are this season.

Player	For	Against	Result	Date
(French Polynesia) Roonui Tinirauarii^{7}	Dragon	Excelsior	0–21	12 September 2026
(French Polynesia) Gervais Chan Kat^{6}	Dragon	Excelsior	0–21	12 September 2026
(French Polynesia) Rayan Oue	Dragon	Excelsior	0–21	12 September 2026
(French Polynesia) Mahatteo Pittman^{7}	Tefana II	Taiarapu	1–12	12 September 2026
(French Polynesia) David Vallet	Tefana II	Taiarapu	1–12	12 September 2026
(French Polynesia) Francois Mu	Tefana II	Arue	0–6	19 September 2026
(French Polynesia) Ariihee Tetuaiteroi	Pueu	Taraiapu	9–0	19 September 2026
(French Polynesia) Frank Papaura	Pueu	Taraiapu	9–0	19 September 2026
(New Caledonia) Makalu Xowi	Dragon	Mataiea	0–22	19 September 2026
(French Polynesia) Roonui Tinirauarii^{9}	Dragon	Mataiea	0–22	19 September 2026
(French Polynesia) Rayan Oue^{4}	Dragon	Mataiea	0–22	19 September 2026
(French Polynesia) Ariiura Labaste^{4}	Jeunes Tahitiens	Tamarii Punaruu II	0–9	19 September 2026
(French Polynesia) Manuarii Shan	Vénus	Manu Ura	0–16	9 October 2026
(New Caledonia) Germain Haewegene^{6}	Vénus	Manu Ura	0–16	9 October 2026
(French Polynesia) Teaonui Tehau	Vénus	Manu Ura	0–16	9 October 2026
(French Polynesia) Heiarii Cheng	Excelsior	Taiarapu	4–0	9 October 2026
(French Polynesia) Tehotu Gitton	Pirae	Tamarii Punaruu	3–3	9 October 2026
(French Polynesia) Francois Mu	Tefana II	Tamarii Punaruu II	0–6	10 October 2026
(French Polynesia) Franck Papaura	Pueu	Tamarii Punaruu II	5–0	13 October 2026
(French Polynesia) Mahatteo Pittman	Tefana II	Central Sport II	0–10	13 October 2026
(French Polynesia) Vincent Leclair	Jeunes Tahitiens	Tamarii Punaruu	3–5	16 October 2026
(New Caledonia) Makalu Xowi^{6}	Dragon	Manu Ura	2–19	17 October 2026
(French Polynesia) Puheitiny Robinson^{5}	Dragon	Manu Ura	2–19	17 October 2026
(French Polynesia) Rayan Oue^{5}	Dragon	Manu Ura	2–19	17 October 2026
(French Polynesia) Manuarii Shan	Vénus	Mataiea	0–18	20 October 2026
(French Polynesia) Herirai Vahirua^{5}	Vénus	Mataiea	0–18	20 October 2026
(French Polynesia) Lucas Albert^{7}	Vénus	Mataiea	0–18	20 October 2026
(French Polynesia) Kahi Morgant^{6}	Tefana	Manu Ura	0–20	20 October 2026
(French Polynesia) Eden Cadausteau	Tefana	Manu Ura	0–20	20 October 2026
(French Polynesia) Honoura Maraetefau^{4}	Tefana	Manu Ura	0–20	20 October 2026
(French Polynesia) Huriarii Manau	Tamarii Punaruu	Central Sport	0–7	23 October 2026
(French Polynesia) Ariiura Labaste	Jeunes Tahitiens	Manu Ura	18–0	30 October 2026
(French Polynesia) Nathan Mabit	Jeunes Tahitiens	Manu Ura	18–0	30 October 2026
(French Polynesia) Teaonui Tehau^{6}	Vénus	Taiarapu	0–15	31 October 2026
(French Polynesia) Lucas Albert^{5}	Vénus	Taiarapu	0–15	31 October 2026
(French Polynesia) Honoura Maraetefau^{4}	Tefana II	Arue	18–0	31 October 2026
(French Polynesia) Kamalani Bennett^{4}	Tefana II	Arue	18–0	31 October 2026
(French Polynesia) Tauhiti Keck	Tefana II	Arue	18–0	31 October 2026
(French Polynesia) Teikiukumaana Ah Sam	Excelsior	Central Sport	1–3	31 October 2026
(French Polynesia) Teaonui Tehau	Vénus	Tamarii Punaruu 2	22-0	6 November 2026
(French Polynesia) Keahinui Brown	Vénus	Tamarii Punaruu 2	22-0	6 November 2026
(French Polynesia) Vaitoarii Taupua^{4}	Vénus	Tamarii Punaruu 2	22-0	6 November 2026
(New Caledonia) Germain Haewegene^{4}	Vénus	Tamarii Punaruu 2	22-0	6 November 2026
(French Polynesia) Lucas Albert	Vénus	Tamarii Punaruu 2	22-0	6 November 2026
(French Polynesia) Francois Mu^{4}	Tefana 2	Manu Ura	3-12	6 November 2026
(French Polynesia) Raitupu Marmouyet^{4}	Tefana 2	Manu Ura	3-12	6 November 2026
(French Polynesia) Maitere Tanerii^{7}	Central Sport 1	Taiarapu	18-0	7 November 2026
(French Polynesia) Owen Teiri	Central Sport 1	Taiarapu	18-0	7 November 2026
(French Polynesia) Fred Tissot	Central Sport 1	Taiarapu	18-0	7 November 2026
(French Polynesia) Joel Teikihakaupoko	Central Sport 1	Arue	1-8	19 September 2026
(New Caledonia) Makalu Xowi^{4}	Dragon	Tamarii Punaruu 2	18-1	19 September 2026
(French Polynesia) Kahu'ani Heidi's	Dragon	Tamarii Punaruu 2	18-1	19 September 2026
(French Polynesia) Rayan Oue^{5}	Dragon	Tamarii Punaruu 2	18-1	19 September 2026

- ^{4}Player scored 4 goals
- ^{5}Player scored 5 goals
- ^{6}Player scored 6 goals
- ^{7}Player scored 7 goals
- ^{9}Player scored 9 goals

Most multiple hat-tricks by a player in the season

- 4 multiple hat-tricks.
  - Rayan Oue

=== Ligue 2 Moorea ===
Player	For	Against	Result	Date
