= Football at the 2023 Pacific Games – Men's team squads =

The 2023 Pacific Games men's football tournament is an international football tournament held in the Solomon Islands from 17 November – 2 December 2023.

The age listed for each player is their age on the first day of the tournament, 17 November 2023.

== Group A ==
=== Cook Islands ===
Head coach: (England) Alan Taylor

No.	Pos.	Player	Date of birth (age)	Caps	Goals	Club
1	GK	Tahiri Elikana	14 September 1988 (aged 35)	12	0	(Cook Islands Football Association) Nikao Sokattak
2	DF	Sunai Joseph	20 February 1998 (aged 25)	3	0	(Cook Islands Football Association) Tupapa Maraerenga
3	FW	Siaosi Kaufononga	20 February 1995 (aged 28)	0	0	(Cook Islands Football Association) Tupapa Maraerenga
4	DF	Jarves Aperau	21 November 1997 (aged 25)	0	0	(Cook Islands Football Association) Puaikura
5	MF	Alex McGregor	27 August 1989 (aged 34)	3	0	(New Zealand Football) Central United
7	DF	Paavo Mustonen	10 November 1989 (aged 34)	13	0	(Cook Islands Football Association) Tupapa Maraerenga
8	DF	Orin Prattley	3 November 1997 (aged 26)	4	0	(New Zealand Football) Brooklyn Northern United
9	FW	Daniel Taokia	22 December 1998 (aged 24)	3	0	(Cook Islands Football Association) Tupapa Maraerenga
10	MF	Grover Harmon	9 August 1989 (aged 34)	13	1	(Cook Islands Football Association) Tupapa Maraerenga
11	FW	Taylor Saghabi	25 December 1990 (aged 32)	14	6	(Cook Islands Football Association) Tupapa Maraerenga
12	MF	Akiona Tairi	16 May 1990 (aged 33)	3	0	(Cook Islands Football Association) Titikaveka
13	MF	Tremaine Rimene-Albrett	1 January 2002 (aged 21)	0	0	(New Zealand Football) Douglas Villa
14	FW	Dalziel Beal	26 April 2005 (aged 18)	3	0	(Cook Islands Football Association) Matavera
15	DF	Avi Enoka	1 November 2001 (aged 22)	3	1	(Cook Islands Football Association) Tupapa Maraerenga
16	DF	Nuku Mokoroa	15 May 2004 (aged 19)	0	0	(Cook Islands Football Association) Nikao Sokattak
18	MF	Lee Harmon Jr.	23 October 2001 (aged 22)	4	0	(Cook Islands Football Association) Tupapa Maraerenga
19	DF	Dwayne Tiputoa	8 December 1997 (aged 25)	4	1	(Cook Islands Football Association) Tupapa Maraerenga
20	GK	Ngereine Maro	20 March 2005 (aged 18)	0	0	(Royal Dutch Football Association) RPC Eindhoven

=== New Caledonia ===
Head coach: (France) Johann Sidaner

Sidaner named his 21-man squad on 15 November 2023

No.	Pos.	Player	Date of birth (age)	Caps	Goals	Club
1	GK	Rocky Nyikeine	26 May 1992 (aged 31)	23	0	(New Caledonian Football Federation) Hienghène Sport
2	DF	Gabriel Vakoume	9 February 1989 (aged 34)	3	0	(New Caledonian Football Federation) Kunié
3	DF	William Rokaud	3 October 2001 (aged 22)	3	1	(New Caledonian Football Federation) Magenta
4	DF	Vincent Vakié	20 October 1990 (aged 33)	4	0	(New Caledonian Football Federation) Kunié
5	MF	Fonzy Ranchain	22 July 1994 (aged 29)	2	0	(New Caledonian Football Federation) Hienghène Sport
6	DF	Martin Makam	15 September 2001 (aged 22)	2	0	(New Caledonian Football Federation) Magenta
7	MF	Morgan Mathelon	12 September 1991 (aged 32)	7	0	(New Caledonian Football Federation) Tiga Sport
8	MF	Pierre Bako	9 August 2001 (aged 22)	6	1	(New Caledonian Football Federation) Gaïtcha
9	FW	Lues Waya	1 August 2001 (aged 22)	1	0	(French Football Federation) USSA Vertou
10	MF	Willy Read	11 January 2003 (aged 20)	3	1	(New Caledonian Football Federation) Lössi
11	MF	César Zeoula	29 August 1989 (aged 34)	35	10	(French Football Federation) US Chauvigny
12	MF	Shene Wélépane	9 December 1997 (aged 25)	13	4	(New Caledonian Football Federation) Tiga Sport
13	DF	Josué Wélépane	19 April 2000 (aged 23)	1	0	(New Caledonian Football Federation) Tiga Sport
14	FW	Titouan Richard	4 December 2000 (aged 22)	1	0	(French Football Federation) Olympique Salaise Rhodia
15	MF	Gérard Waia	22 December 2004 (aged 18)	1	1	(New Caledonian Football Federation) Tiga Sport
16	GK	Mickaël Ulile	16 July 1997 (aged 26)	11	0	(New Caledonian Football Federation) Magenta
17	MF	Jean-Jacques Katrawa	2 August 1999 (aged 24)	3	0	(New Caledonian Football Federation) Gaïtcha
18	DF	Bernard Iwa	16 May 1999 (aged 24)	7	0	(New Caledonian Football Federation) Lössi
20	MF	Makalu Xowi	20 April 1999 (aged 24)	4	3	(Tahitian Football Federation) Central Sport
21	MF	Robert Neoere	18 April 1996 (aged 27)	3	0	(New Caledonian Football Federation) Kunié
23	DF	Gianni Manmieu	3 August 1994 (aged 29)	2	0	(New Caledonian Football Federation) Kunié

=== Tonga ===
Head coach: (Tonga) Timote Moleni

Moleni named his 20-man squad on 11 November 2023

No.	Pos.	Player	Date of birth (age)	Caps	Goals	Club
1	GK	Semisi ‘Otukolo	23 June 1999 (aged 24)	6	0	(Tonga Football Association) Veitongo
2	DF	Petelo Naniseni	20 December 2003 (aged 19)	0	0	(Tonga Football Association) Navutoka
3	DF	Kulisitofa Kite	17 January 2003 (aged 20)	2	0	(Tonga Football Association) Lavengatonga
4	DF	Nicolas Vea	31 October 2003 (aged 20)	0	0	(Tonga Football Association) Navutoka
5	DF	Sione Tu’ifangaloka	24 April 1999 (aged 24)	2	0	(Tonga Football Association) Veitongo
6	MF	Petueli Tokotaha	25 March 2004 (aged 19)	3	2	(Tonga Football Association) Longolongo
7	FW	Hemaloto Polovili	27 July 1997 (aged 26)	12	1	(Tonga Football Association) Veitongo
8	MF	Christopher Kefu	11 February 2003 (aged 20)	2	0	(Tonga Football Association) Veitongo
9	MF	Taniela Vaka’uta		0	0	(Tonga Football Association) Folaha
10	FW	Amoni Fifita	26 June 2004 (aged 19)	0	0	(Tonga Football Association) Makave
11	FW	Elias Kendler		0	0	(Tonga Football Association) Haʻamoko United Youth
12	MF	Tau’aika Sonasi		0	0	(Tonga Football Association) Marist
13	FW	Nuku ‘Esau		0	0	(Tonga Football Association) Navutoka
14	FW	Feki Tufi	11 April 2000 (aged 23)	0	0	(Tonga Football Association) Veitongo
15	MF	Petueli Tokotaha	10 September 2000 (aged 23)	3	2	(Tonga Football Association) Navutoka
16	MF	Mohammed Rajani	19 April 1999 (aged 24)	0	0	(Football Australia) Rockdale Ilinden
17	DF	Ta’u Tupou		0	0	(Tonga Football Association) Vava'u
18	DF	Fakaofo Tonga	29 October 2004 (aged 19)	0	0	(Tonga Football Association) Navutoka
19	GK	David-John Tuamoheloa	30 June 2004 (aged 19)	0	0	(New Zealand Football) Manukau United
20	GK	Justin Toetu’u		0	0	(Tonga Football Association) Longolongo

== Group B ==
=== Papua New Guinea ===
Head coach: (Australia) Warren Moon

Moon named his 23-man squad on 13 November 2023.

No.	Pos.	Player	Date of birth (age)	Caps	Goals	Club
1	GK	Dave Tomare	26 April 1997 (aged 26)	0	0	(Papua New Guinea Football Association) Hekari United
2	DF	Daniel Joe	29 May 1990 (aged 33)	21	0	(Papua New Guinea Football Association) Hekari United
3	DF	Godfrey Haro	30 June 1998 (aged 25)	0	0	(Papua New Guinea Football Association) Southern Strikers
4	DF	Abel Redenut	17 April 1995 (aged 28)	0	0	(Papua New Guinea Football Association) Hekari United
6	FW	Ati Kepo	15 January 1996 (aged 27)	13	5	(Papua New Guinea Football Association) Hekari United
8	MF	Rex Naime	23 October 2003 (aged 20)	0	0	(Papua New Guinea Football Association) Hekari United
9	MF	Nigel Dabinyaba	26 October 1992 (aged 31)	19	11	(Papua New Guinea Football Association) Hekari United
10	FW	Kolu Kepo	15 July 1993 (aged 30)	9	4	(Papua New Guinea Football Association) Hekari United
11	MF	Yagi Yasasa	17 August 2000 (aged 23)	3	0	(Papua New Guinea Football Association) Hekari United
12	MF	Oberth Simon	1 January 2001 (aged 22)	0	0	(Papua New Guinea Football Association) Hekari United
13	FW	Tommy Semmy	30 September 1994 (aged 29)	14	5	(Football Australia) Dandenong City
14	MF	Emmanuel Simon	25 December 1992 (aged 30)	23	4	(Papua New Guinea Football Association) Lae City
15	DF	Joseph Waiwai	7 March 2001 (aged 22)	0	0	(Papua New Guinea Football Association) Port Moresby Strikers
16	FW	Pascal Kundi	15 January 1996 (aged 27)	0	0	(Papua New Guinea Football Association) Port Moresby Strikers
17	DF	Nathaniel Eddie	29 June 2002 (aged 21)	0	0	(Papua New Guinea Football Association) Hekari United
18	MF	Tizoki Tamgol		0	0	(Papua New Guinea Football Association) Port Moresby
19	FW	Kenneth Arah	15 January 1996 (aged 27)	0	0	(Papua New Guinea Football Association) Gulf Komara
20	GK	Ronald Warisan	20 September 1989 (aged 34)	22	0	(Papua New Guinea Football Association) Lae City
21	GK	Vagi Koniel	26 October 1996 (aged 27)	0	0	(Papua New Guinea Football Association) Lae City
23	DF	Thomas Yagum	21 May 1995 (aged 28)	0	0	(Papua New Guinea Football Association) Lae City
24	FW	Troy Dobbin	24 September 2001 (aged 22)	0	0	(Papua New Guinea Football Association) Gulf Komara
26	MF	Joseph Joe	14 June 2002 (aged 21)	0	0	(Papua New Guinea Football Association) Hekari United

=== Tuvalu ===
Head coach: (Tuvalu) Osamesa Mesako

No.	Pos.	Player	Date of birth (age)	Caps	Goals	Club
1	GK	Katepu Iosua	11 May 1988 (aged 35)	14	0	(Tuvalu Islands Football Association) Tofaga
2	DF	John Tuilagi	5 September 1997 (aged 26)	7	0	(Tuvalu Islands Football Association) Niutao
3	DF	Fakafou Uriam		0	0	(Tuvalu Islands Football Association)
4	DF	Aloesi Nukualofa	5 February 1994 (aged 29)	0	0	(Tuvalu Islands Football Association) Manu Laeva
5	DF	Siale Sopoaga		0	0	(Tuvalu Islands Football Association)
6	MF	Saulo Haulangi		0	0	(Tuvalu Islands Football Association)
7	MF	Paulo Vailine	7 March 1993 (aged 30)	8	3	(Tuvalu Islands Football Association) Nauti
8	MF	Andrew Pelekata		0	0	(Tuvalu Islands Football Association)
9	FW	Iasona Lui		0	0	(Tuvalu Islands Football Association) Tofaga
11	FW	Keni Vine		0	0	(Tuvalu Islands Football Association)
12	FW	Asaia Eliko		0	0	(Tuvalu Islands Football Association)
13	GK	Kioa Elisala		0	0	(Tuvalu Islands Football Association)
14	MF	Niuatea Luka		0	0	(Tuvalu Islands Football Association) Niutao
15	DF	Sepetaio Nokisi	11 September 1993 (aged 30)	5	0	(New Zealand Football) Te Atatu
16	DF	Tekie Tumau		0	0	(Tuvalu Islands Football Association)
17	MF	Metia Lisati		0	0	(Tuvalu Islands Football Association)
18	FW	Yvan Sapele		0	0	(New Zealand Football) Wainuiomata
19	DF	Maalosi Alefaio	19 January 1993 (aged 30)	5	0	(New Zealand Football) Te Atatu
20	MF	Matti Ualesi	23 May 1992 (aged 31)	3	0	(Tuvalu Islands Football Association) Lakena United
22	MF	Tulimanu Lisati		0	0	(Football Australia) Stormbirds SC
23	MF	Falaima Mokeni	29 March 2002 (aged 21)	0	0	(New Zealand Football) North Wellington
24	FW	Teuati Tamatoa		0	0	(Tuvalu Islands Football Association)
25	DF	Jason Alama	31 October 2002 (aged 21)	0	0	(New Zealand Football) West Coast Rangers

=== Vanuatu ===
Head coach: (Brazil) Emerson Alcântara

No.	Pos.	Player	Date of birth (age)	Caps	Goals	Club
1	GK	Anthony Taiwia	4 September 1994 (aged 29)	0	0	(Vanuatu Football Federation) Ifira Black Bird
2	DF	Tasso Jeffrey	12 August 1998 (aged 25)	1	0	(Football Australia) Gawler Eagles
3	MF	Raoul Coulon	3 December 1995 (aged 27)	3	0	(Vanuatu Football Federation) Yatel
4	DF	Michel Coulon	3 December 1995 (aged 27)	12	1	(Vanuatu Football Federation) Yatel
5	DF	Timothy Boulet	29 November 1998 (aged 24)	7	0	(New Zealand Football) Auckland City
6	MF	Claude Aru	25 April 1997 (aged 26)	6	1	(Vanuatu Football Federation) North Efate United
7	FW	Godine Tenene	3 May 1998 (aged 25)	5	0	(Vanuatu Football Federation) Ifira Black Bird
8	MF	Jean Taussi	17 July 1996 (aged 27)	3	0	(Vanuatu Football Federation) Ifira Black Bird
9	FW	Azariah Soromon	1 March 1999 (aged 24)	17	7	(Fiji Football Association) Suva
10	MF	John Alick	25 April 1991 (aged 32)	12	0	(Solomon Islands Football Federation) Solomon Warriors
11	FW	Alex Saniel	8 November 1996 (aged 27)	13	1	(Fiji Football Association) Suva
12	MF	John Wohale	9 July 1997 (aged 26)	2	0	(Vanuatu Football Federation) Ifira Black Bird
13	FW	Tonly Kalotang	19 May 1997 (aged 26)	2	0	(Vanuatu Football Federation) Ifira Black Bird
14	MF	Joe Moses	22 May 2002 (aged 21)	1	0	(Vanuatu Football Federation) ABM Galaxy
15	MF	Barry Mansale	1 November 1995 (aged 28)	4	0	(Vanuatu Football Federation) Yatel
16	GK	Joshua Willie	13 June 2000 (aged 23)	0	0	(Vanuatu Football Federation) ABM Galaxy
17	MF	Lee Taiwia	23 December 1995 (aged 27)	0	0	(Vanuatu Football Federation) Ifira Black Bird
18	DF	Bethuel Ollie	19 August 1997 (aged 26)	2	0	(Vanuatu Football Federation) North Efate United
21	FW	Jordy Tasip	14 July 2000 (aged 23)	0	0	(New Zealand Football) Auckland City
23	DF	Lency Philip	8 June 1997 (aged 26)	5	0	(Football Australia) Gawler Eagles

== Group C ==
=== Fiji ===
Head coach: (Wales) Robert Sherman

Sherman named his 23-man squad on 10 November 2023.

No.	Pos.	Player	Date of birth (age)	Caps	Goals	Club
1	GK	Mohammed Alzaar Alam	8 February 2000 (aged 23)	5	0	(Fiji Football Association) Rewa
2	DF	Brendan McMullen	30 June 2002 (aged 21)	0	0	(New Zealand Football) Wellington Olympic
3	DF	Epeli Lairoti	3 June 1995 (aged 28)	1	0	(Fiji Football Association) Suva
4	MF	Patrick Joseph	3 May 1998 (aged 25)	19	2	(Fiji Football Association) Rewa
5	MF	Sitiveni Cavuilagi	26 July 1994 (aged 29)	8	0	(Fiji Football Association) Lautoka
6	MF	Thomas Dunn	19 January 2003 (aged 20)	0	0	(Fiji Football Association) Navua
7	MF	Dave Radrigai	15 March 1990 (aged 33)	27	2	(Fiji Football Association) Suva
8	MF	Setareki Hughes	8 June 1995 (aged 28)	33	1	(Fiji Football Association) Rewa
9	FW	Roy Krishna	30 August 1987 (aged 36)	48	32	(All India Football Federation) Odisha
10	MF	Nabil Begg	17 March 2004 (aged 19)	2	0	(Fiji Football Association) Ba
11	DF	Ilimotama Jese	16 March 1990 (aged 33)	8	0	(Fiji Football Association) Lautoka
12	MF	Tevita Waranaivalu	16 September 1995 (aged 28)	16	2	(Fiji Football Association) Rewa
13	MF	Mohammed Ramzan Khan	22 November 1999 (aged 23)	0	0	(Fiji Football Association) Suva
14	FW	Sairusi Nalaubu	14 December 1996 (aged 26)	7	5	(Fiji Football Association) Lautoka
15	MF	Etonia Dogalau	24 February 2001 (aged 22)	0	0	(Fiji Football Association) Ba
16	DF	Gabriele Matanisiga	14 June 1995 (aged 28)	6	1	(Fiji Football Association) Rewa
17	DF	Filipe Baravilala	25 November 1994 (aged 28)	4	0	(Fiji Football Association) Suva
18	DF	Lekima Gonerau	8 December 1989 (aged 33)	0	0	(Fiji Football Association) Labasa
19	FW	Merrill Nand	22 September 2000 (aged 23)	0	0	(Fiji Football Association) Suva
20	GK	Isikeli Sevanaia	11 January 2003 (aged 20)	0	0	(Fiji Football Association) Rewa
21	DF	Sterling Vasconcellos	19 April 2005 (aged 18)	0	0	(Fiji Football Association) Lautoka
22	GK	Akuila Mateisuva	15 January 1992 (aged 31)	7	0	(Fiji Football Association) Suva
23	DF	Kishan Sami	13 March 2000 (aged 23)	13	1	(Fiji Football Association) Rewa

=== Northern Mariana Islands ===
Head coach: (Japan) Mita Michiteru

Michiteru named his 23-man squad on 13 November 2023.

No.	Pos.	Player	Date of birth (age)	Caps	Goals	Club
1	GK	Merrick Toves	1 December 2004 (aged 18)	0	0	(The Football Association) RIASA
2	DF	Jonne Navarro	17 May 2007 (aged 16)	0	0	(Northern Mariana Islands Football Association) Latte
3	DF	Ronnel Ocanada	26 February 2001 (aged 22)	2	0	(Northern Mariana Islands Football Association) MP United
4	DF	Cody Shimizu	4 July 2006 (aged 17)	0	0	(Northern Mariana Islands Football Association) MP United
5	DF	Daniell Pablo	16 January 2005 (aged 18)	1	0	(Northern Mariana Islands Football Association) Kanoa
6	MF	Anthony Austria		0	0	(Northern Mariana Islands Football Association) Latte
7	MF	Jireh Yobech	8 July 1996 (aged 27)	8	0	(Northern Mariana Islands Football Association) MP United
8	MF	Brian Lubao	5 December 2004 (aged 18)	0	0	(Northern Mariana Islands Football Association) Kanoa
9	DF	Akira Kadokura	2 May 2004 (aged 19)	0	0	(Northern Mariana Islands Football Association) Eleven Tiger
10	MF	Markus Toves	27 May 2007 (aged 16)	0	0	(Northern Mariana Islands Football Association) Kanoa
11	MF	Ariel Narvaez	24 September 2005 (aged 18)	0	0	(Northern Mariana Islands Football Association) Eleven Tiger
12	GK	Mark Chavez	7 March 2006 (aged 17)	0	0	(Northern Mariana Islands Football Association) Latte
13	DF	Dev Bachani	4 May 2005 (aged 18)	2	0	(Northern Mariana Islands Football Association) MP United
14	DF	Jerald Aquino	25 October 2004 (aged 19)	0	0	(Northern Mariana Islands Football Association) Eleven Tiger
15	MF	Anthony Bergancia	11 April 2006 (aged 17)	0	0	(Northern Mariana Islands Football Association) Latte
16	FW	Ruben Guerrero		0	0	(Northern Mariana Islands Football Association) Kanoa
17	DF	Leland Guerrero	11 July 2006 (aged 17)	0	0	(Northern Mariana Islands Football Association) Kanoa
18	FW	Nolan Ngewakl	8 July 2008 (aged 15)	0	0	(Northern Mariana Islands Football Association) Matansa
19	MF	Tyler Omelau	28 November 2007 (aged 15)	0	0	(Northern Mariana Islands Football Association) Kanoa
20	DF	Zhi Xiang Lin	20 July 2007 (aged 16)	0	0	(Northern Mariana Islands Football Association) Latte
21	MF	Wataru Kadokura	7 April 2007 (aged 16)	0	0	(Northern Mariana Islands Football Association) Matansa
22	FW	Mark Costales	3 January 2008 (aged 15)	0	0	(Northern Mariana Islands Football Association) Latte
23	DF	Casey Chambers	29 May 2007 (aged 16)	0	0	(Northern Mariana Islands Football Association) MP United

=== Tahiti ===
Head coach: (French Polynesia) Samuel Garcia

Tahiti's 22-man squad was announced on 7 November 2023.

No.	Pos.	Player	Date of birth (age)	Caps	Goals	Club
1	GK	Tevaearai Tamatai	15 January 2001 (aged 22)	0	0	(Tahitian Football Federation) Vénus
2	DF	Mauri Heitaa	31 July 1999 (aged 24)	1	0	(Tahitian Football Federation) Vénus
3	DF	Téva Lossec	3 December 2002 (aged 20)	0	0	(United States Soccer Federation) Campbell Fighting Camels
4	MF	Kavai'ei Morgant	8 October 2001 (aged 22)	3	1	(Tahitian Football Federation) Tefana
5	DF	François Hapipi	10 March 1999 (aged 24)	4	0	(Tahitian Football Federation) Tefana
6	FW	Manuarii Shan	23 February 2004 (aged 19)	1	0	(Tahitian Football Federation) Vénus
7	DF	Marama Amau	13 January 1991 (aged 32)	10	0	(Tahitian Football Federation) Vénus
8	MF	Roonui Tehau	15 December 1999 (aged 23)	6	1	(Tahitian Football Federation) Vénus
9	MF	Tauhiti Keck	1 August 1994 (aged 29)	10	6	(Tahitian Football Federation) Vénus
10	FW	Teaonui Tehau	1 September 1992 (aged 31)	36	24	(Tahitian Football Federation) Vénus
11	FW	Roonui Tinirauarii	14 March 1997 (aged 26)	3	2	(Tahitian Football Federation) Dragon
12	FW	Raimana Tetuanui	1 January 1994 (aged 29)	2	0	(Tahitian Football Federation) Pueu
13	MF	Honoura Maraetefau	27 July 2002 (aged 21)	4	0	(Tahitian Football Federation) Tefana
14	MF	Frank Papaura	6 April 2005 (aged 18)	1	0	(Tahitian Football Federation) Pueu
15	FW	Tauatua Lucas	23 November 1994 (aged 28)	0	2	(Tahitian Football Federation) Tefana
16	GK	Teave Teamotuaitau	17 April 1992 (aged 31)	11	0	(Tahitian Football Federation) Vénus
17	MF	Paolo Hausner	21 February 2002 (aged 21)	0	0	(French Football Federation) FCM Troyes
18	DF	Terai Bremond	16 May 2001 (aged 22)	4	0	(Tahitian Football Federation) Vénus
19	DF	Keanu Vernaudon	18 October 2002 (aged 21)	0	0	(Tahitian Football Federation) Tefana
20	MF	Eddy Kaspard	27 May 2001 (aged 22)	4	2	(Tahitian Football Federation) Tefana
21	MF	Matéo Degrumelle	22 August 2003 (aged 20)	0	0	(French Football Federation) Le Havre B
23	GK	Moana Pito	25 January 2000 (aged 23)	2	0	(Tahitian Football Federation) Tefana

== Group D ==
=== American Samoa ===
Head coach: (American Samoa) Ruben Luvu

No.	Pos.	Player	Date of birth (age)	Caps	Goals	Club
1	GK	Penieli Atu	5 September 2005 (aged 18)	0	0	(Football Federation American Samoa) PanSa
2	MF	Roy Ledoux	26 June 2000 (aged 23)	5	0	(Football Federation American Samoa) Pago Youth
3	DF	Austin Kaleopa	24 April 2001 (aged 22)	5	0	(Football Federation American Samoa) Utulei Youth
4	DF	Poasa Collins	12 January 2004 (aged 19)	0	0	(Football Federation American Samoa) Pago Youth
5	DF	Leaga Lealuga		0	0	(Football Federation American Samoa) Black Roses
6	DF	Robert Yarofalir		0	0	(Football Federation American Samoa) Green Bay
7	FW	Petu Pouli	18 December 2005 (aged 17)	0	0	(Football Federation American Samoa) Vaiala Tongan
8	DF	Lalofau Fe'a		0	0	(Football Federation American Samoa) Pago Youth
9	FW	Daniel Lee	17 February 2007 (aged 16)	0	0	(Football Federation American Samoa) Royal Puma
10	MF	Tia Silao		0	0	(Football Federation American Samoa) Pago Youth
11	MF	Billjay Vaitoelau	13 April 2002 (aged 21)	0	0	(Football Federation American Samoa) Royal Puma
12	MF	Kuresa Taga'i	4 August 2000 (aged 23)	5	0	(Football Federation American Samoa) Ilaoa and To'omata
13	MF	Larry Silao		0	0	(Football Federation American Samoa) Pago Youth
14	DF	Misiona Fagapulea		0	0	(Football Federation American Samoa) Ilaoa and To'omata
15	DF	Pela Scanlan	24 January 2006 (aged 17)	0	0	(Football Federation American Samoa) Pago Youth
16	MF	Ben Tofaeono	18 March 2006 (aged 17)	0	0	(Football Federation American Samoa) Ilaoa and To'omata
17	MF	Pago Isu	13 November 2005 (aged 18)	0	0	(Football Federation American Samoa) Black Roses
18	FW	Tala Fereti		0	0	(Football Federation American Samoa) Ilaoa and To'omata
19	FW	Paneta Loke		0	0	(Football Federation American Samoa) Lion Heart
20	MF	Puni Samuelu	16 August 1996 (aged 27)	5	0	(Football Federation American Samoa) Pago Youth
23	GK	Matthias Logologo		0	0	(Football Federation American Samoa) Pago Youth

=== Samoa ===
Head coach: (Northern Ireland) Ryan Stewart

No.	Pos.	Player	Date of birth (age)	Caps	Goals	Club
1	GK	Joel Bartley	13 April 2005 (aged 18)	0	0	(Football Australia) Sydney United 58
2	DF	Luke Tolo-Kent	29 April 2003 (aged 20)	0	0	(New Zealand Football) Miramar Rangers
3	DF	Luke Salisbury	15 September 2004 (aged 19)	0	0	(New Zealand Football) Roslyn-Wakari
4	DF	Taine Wilson	8 November 2004 (aged 19)	0	0	(United States Soccer Federation) Quincy Hawks
5	DF	Kaleb De Groot-Green	11 May 2002 (aged 21)	0	0	(New Zealand Football) Dunedin City Royals
6	DF	Andrew Setefano	10 August 1987 (aged 36)	15	0	(Football Federation Samoa) Lupe o le Soaga
7	MF	Va'a Taualai	4 June 1998 (aged 25)	2	0	(Football Federation Samoa) Lupe o le Soaga
8	FW	Dauntae Mariner	25 January 2000 (aged 23)	0	0	(Football Australia) Brisbane Strikers
9	FW	Michael Tumua Leo	15 January 2003 (aged 20)	2	0	(Football Federation Samoa) Lupe o le Soaga
10	FW	Pharrell Trainor	20 June 2006 (aged 17)	0	0	(Football Australia) Newcastle Jets Youth
11	MF	Falaniko Nanumea	17 January 2002 (aged 21)	2	0	(Football Federation Samoa) Vailima Kiwi
12	FW	Ethan Stowers	26 October 2005 (aged 18)	0	0	(Football Federation Samoa) Faatoia United
13	MF	Falaniko Nanumea	4 April 1999 (aged 24)	0	0	(Football Federation Samoa) Vailima Kiwi
14	DF	Legend Spencer		0	0	(United States Soccer Federation) FC Minneapolis
15	MF	Alman Kwan	18 January 2003 (aged 20)	0	0	(Football Federation Samoa) Vaivase-Tai
16	MF	Darren Talilai	23 October 1995 (aged 28)	0	0	(Football Federation Samoa) Lupe o le Soaga
17	FW	Dilo Tumua	15 March 2000 (aged 23)	0	0	(Football Federation Samoa) Lupe o le Soaga
18	MF	Tuuga Malaeamanu		0	0	(Football Federation Samoa) Adidas SC
19	MF	Reupena Fasi	14 January 2005 (aged 18)	0	0	(Football Federation Samoa) Goldstar Sogi
22	GK	Osa Savelio	2 May 2000 (aged 23)	0	0	(Football Federation Samoa) Lupe o le Soaga

=== Solomon Islands ===
Head coach: (Spain) Felipe Vega-Arango

Vega-Arango named his 23-man squad on 6 November 2023.

No.	Pos.	Player	Date of birth (age)	Caps	Goals	Club
1	GK	Philip Mango	28 August 1995 (aged 28)	33	0	(Solomon Islands Football Federation) Central Coast
2	DF	Loea Taisara	2 June 1989 (aged 34)	0	0	(Solomon Islands Football Federation) Solomon Warriors
3	DF	Allen Peter	11 September 1995 (aged 28)	11	0	(Solomon Islands Football Federation) Solomon Warriors
4	DF	Leon Kofana	22 June 2002 (aged 21)	11	0	(Solomon Islands Football Federation) Henderson Eels
5	DF	Javin Wae	17 November 2002 (aged 21)	10	0	(Solomon Islands Football Federation) Central Coast
6	MF	Atkin Kaua	4 April 1996 (aged 27)	27	5	(Solomon Islands Football Federation) Laugu United
7	FW	Micah Lea'alafa	1 June 1991 (aged 32)	15	7	(Football Australia) FK Beograd
8	MF	Molis Gagame	21 September 1989 (aged 34)	7	0	(Solomon Islands Football Federation) Kossa
9	FW	Bobby Leslie	3 March 2000 (aged 23)	3	1	(Solomon Islands Football Federation) Waneagu United
10	FW	Raphael Lea'i	9 September 2003 (aged 20)	12	10	(Football Association of Bosnia and Herzegovina) FK Velež Mostar
11	MF	Gagame Feni	21 August 1992 (aged 31)	29	16	(Solomon Islands Football Federation) Kossa
12	GK	Michael Laulae	20 May 2002 (aged 21)	1	0	(Solomon Islands Football Federation) Henderson Eels
13	FW	John Orobulu	29 August 2000 (aged 23)	1	0	(Solomon Islands Football Federation) Southern United
14	MF	Tigi Molea	24 September 1992 (aged 31)	3	0	(Solomon Islands Football Federation) Solomon Warriors
15	MF	William Komasi	10 June 2000 (aged 23)	10	1	(Solomon Islands Football Federation) Central Coast
16	DF	Calvin Ohasio	5 April 2000 (aged 23)	3	0	(Solomon Islands Football Federation) Marist
17	MF	Alwin Hou	18 September 1996 (aged 27)	13	6	(Solomon Islands Football Federation) Solomon Warriors
18	DF	Aengari Gagame	15 April 2000 (aged 23)	3	0	(Solomon Islands Football Federation) Solomon Warriors
19	MF	Joses Nawo	3 May 1988 (aged 35)	47	8	(Solomon Islands Football Federation) Kossa
20	GK	Timothy Mae'arasia	19 June 1995 (aged 28)	1	0	(Solomon Islands Football Federation) Solomon Warriors
21	DF	David Supa	21 December 2000 (aged 22)	4	0	(Solomon Islands Football Federation) Central Coast
22	DF	Alick Stanton	25 May 1998 (aged 25)	3	0	(Solomon Islands Football Federation) Central Coast
23	MF	Marlon Tahioa	16 September 1999 (aged 24)	4	0	(Fiji Football Association) Suva
