= Makalu Xowi =

New Caledonian footballer (born 1999)

Personal information
- Full name: Makalu François Xowi
- Date of birth: 20 April 1999 (age 27)
- Place of birth: New Caledonia
- Position: Midfielder

Team information
- Current team: Dragon

Senior career*
Years	Team	Apps	(Gls)
2013–2018	Ne Drehu		
2018–2023	Temanava		
2022	→ CO Hmeleck (loan)		
2023–2024	Central Sport		
2024–	Dragon		

International career^{‡}
2023–	New Caledonia	8	(5)
Medal record
Men's football
Representing New Caledonia
Pacific Games
Gold medal – first place	2023 Solomon Islands
MSG Prime Minister's Cup
Runner-up	2023 New Caledonia
- * Club domestic league appearances and goals ‡ National team caps and goals as of 6 February 2026

Makalu Xowi (born 20 April 1999) is a New Caledonian footballer currently playing for Central Sport and the New Caledonia national team.

== Club career ==
From a young age, Xowi played for SC Ne Drehu of the New Caledonia Super Ligue. In 2013 he scored his club's only goal in a league victory over AS Tiga Sport. The victory was Ne Drehu's first of the 2013 season following five defeats. The goal was the player's second of the season.

Xowi moved abroad to join Tahiti's A.S. Temanava in 2018. In 2019 the club competed in the Tahiti Ligue 2. Xowi became a consistent scorer in the league, scoring a hattrick against A.S. Tiare Tahiti on 13 October. Xowi was Ligue 2's top scorer for the 20/21 season. The club worked its way up to the Tahiti Ligue 1 with Xowi scoring twenty-two goals for the club in the league during the 2022-23 season. In 2022, he also had a brief return to New Caledonian football, joining CO Hmeleck on loan. While with the club, he competed in the 2022 Coupe de Calédonie in a match against AS Lössi. He continued his dominant scoring that season back in Tahiti, with performances including five goals in a 7–2 victory over Aito Taurea FC in the 2022 Coupe Élite Tahiti and a brace against A.S. Pueu to earn Temanava its third-straight Ligue 2 victory.

In 2024, Xowi signed for A.S. Dragon of the Tahiti Ligue 1 for the 2024–25 season.

== International career ==
Following two impressive seasons with Temanava, newly appointed New Caledonia manager Johann Sidaner gave Xowi his first senior call-ups for a pair of friendlies against Tahiti in March 2023. The matches were considered a tryout for the 2023 Pacific Games. Sidaner stated that he had full confidence in Xowi because of his goal tally in Tahiti and his observations of the player during his time with CO Hmeleck. Xowi made his debut on 21 March 2023, scoring his first goal in the eventual 2–1 victory. Three days later he made his second appearance, scoring again, as New Caledonia were defeated 1–2. Later in 2023, Xowi was included in New Caledonia's squad for the 2023 MSG Prime Minister's Cup. In the team's second match of the tournament, he scored in a 3–1 victory over Papua New Guinea.

=== International goals ===
Scores and results list New Caledonia's goal tally first.

No.	Date	Venue	Opponent	Score	Result	Competition
1.	21 March 2023	Stade Pater Te Hono Nui, Pirae, Tahiti	Tahiti	1–0	2–0	Friendly
2.	24 March 2023	Stade Pater Te Hono Nui, Pirae, Tahiti	Tahiti	1–1	1–2	Friendly
3.	11 October 2023	Stade Yoshida, Koné, New Caledonia	Papua New Guinea	3–1	3–1	2023 MSG Prime Minister's Cup
4.	24 November 2023	SIFF Academy Field, Honiara, Solomon Islands	Cook Islands	3–0	8–0	2023 Pacific Games
5.	28 November 2023	Lawson Tama Stadium, Honiara, Solomon Islands	Vanuatu	1–0	1–0	2023 Pacific Games
Last updated 28 November 2023

=== International career statistics ===
As of match played 28 November 2023

New Caledonia
Year	Apps	Goals
2023	7	5
Total	7	5

== Career statistics ==
=== Club ===
Club	Season	League			Cup		Others		Total	
Club	Season	Division	Apps	Goals	Apps	Goals	Apps	Goals	Apps	Goals
Temanava	2018–19	Ligue 2 Moorea								
Temanava	2019–20	Ligue 2 Moorea	11	18	1	1			12	19
Temanava	2020–21	Tahiti Ligue 2	5	10			1	1	6	11
Temanava	2021–22	Tahiti Ligue 1	21	26			2	6	23	32
Temanava	2022–23	Tahiti Ligue 1	17	22					17	22
Central Sport	2023–24	Tahiti Ligue 1	18	32	2	1	0	0	20	33
Dragon	2024–25	Tahiti Ligue 1	26	33	3	3	0	0	29	36
Dragon	2025–26	Tahiti Ligue 1	18	9	1	0			19	9
Dragon	2026–27	Tahiti Ligue 1	5	12					5	12
Total			121	162	7	5	3	7	131	174

== Honours ==
New Caledonia

- Pacific Games: Gold Medalist, 2023
- MSG Prime Minister's Cup: Runner-up, 2023
