= 2007 OFC Champions League =

Football Oceania

Tournament details
- Dates: January 21, 2007 – April 29, 2007
- Teams: 6 (from 5 associations)

Final positions
- Champions: (New Zealand) Waitakere United (1st title)
- Runners-up: (Fiji) 4R Electrical Ba

Tournament statistics
- Matches played: 14
- Goals scored: 43 (3.07 per match)
- Top scorer(s): (Solomon Islands) Commins Menapi (5 goals)

The 2007 OFC Champions League was the 6th edition of the Oceanian Club Championship, Oceania's premier club football tournament organized by the Oceania Football Confederation (OFC), and the 1st season under the current OFC Champions League name. Under the new format there was to be no qualifying round, and instead six teams from the six best Oceanic nations would play each other home and away in a group stage before the knockout round. The tournament took place from 21 January until 29 April 2007.

Auckland City qualified as the reigning champions of the OFC Club Championship. The other 5 teams gained their qualifications due to their domestic league performances. Following the withdrawal of Vanuatu’s Port Vila Sharks, the OFC awarded a second berth to Waitakere United, the leader after the first phase of the New Zealand Football Championship.

The winner of the tournament was Waitakere Utd of New Zealand, who beat Ba Electric of Fiji in the final, claiming Oceania's US$1 million (NZ$1.41 million) berth in the 2007 FIFA Club World Cup in Japan the following December.

== Participants ==
Location of teams of the 2007 OFC Champions League.
Participated
Eligible but did not enter

A total of 6 teams from 5 OFC member associations entered the competition.

Association	Team	Qualifying method
Teams entering the group stage
Fiji	4R Electrical Ba	2006 Fiji National Football League champion
(New Caledonia) New Caledonia	Mont-Dore	2005–06 New Caledonia Super Ligue champion
New Zealand	Auckland City	2006 OFC Club Championship champion
New Zealand	Waitakere United	2006–07 New Zealand Football Championship league leader after Round 7
(Solomon Islands) Solomon Islands	Marist	2005–06 Solomon Islands National Club Championship champion
(French Polynesia) Tahiti	Temanava	2006 Cup of Polynesia winner
Teams eligible, but did not enter
(American Samoa) American Samoa	Tafuna Jets	2006 ASFA Soccer League champion
(Cook Islands) Cook Islands	Nikao Sokattack	2006 Cook Islands Round Cup champion
(Papua New Guinea) Papua New Guinea	University Inter	2006 Papua New Guinea National Club Championship champion
Samoa	Vaivase-Tai	2006 Samoa National League champion
Tonga	Lotoha'apai	2006 Tonga Major League champion
Vanuatu	Port Vila Sharks	2006 Vanuatu VFF Bred Cup winner

== Group stage ==
=== Group A ===
Pos	Team	Pld	W	D	L	GF	GA	GD	Pts
1	(New Zealand) Waitakere United	4	2	2	0	13	5	+8	8
2	(New Zealand) Auckland City	4	2	2	0	10	4	+6	8
3	(New Caledonia) Mont-Dore	4	0	0	4	1	15	−14	0

Date	Home team	Score	Away team
Jan 21	Mont-Dore	0–2	Auckland City
Jan 24	Waitakere United	2–2	Auckland City
Feb 20	Waitakere United	6–1	Mont-Dore
Feb 23	Auckland City	4–0	Mont-Dore
Mar 31	Mont-Dore	0–3	Waitakere United
Apr 4	Auckland City	2–2	Waitakere United

=== Group B ===
Pos	Team	Pld	W	D	L	GF	GA	GD	Pts
1	(Fiji) 4R Electrical Ba	4	3	1	0	7	3	+4	10
2	(French Polynesia) Temanava	4	1	1	2	3	5	−2	4
3	(Solomon Islands) Marist	4	1	0	3	5	7	−2	3

Date	Home team	Score	Away team
Mar 12	4R Electrical Ba	3–2	Marist
Mar 4	Temanava	2–1	Marist
Feb 19	Marist	0–2	4R Electrical Ba
Feb 23	Temanava	1–1	4R Electrical Ba
Mar 19	4R Electrical Ba	1–0	Temanava
Mar 22	Marist	2–0	Temanava

== Final ==
Team 1	Agg.	Team 2	1st leg	2nd leg
4R Electrical Ba (Fiji)	2–2 (a)	(New Zealand) Waitakere United	2–1	0–1

April 21, 2007

4R Electrical Ba (Fiji)	2–1	(New Zealand) Waitakere United
Ronald Chandra 7'; Josaia Bukalidi 74'	(Report)	Commins Menapi 54'

Govind Park, Ba, Fiji
Attendance: 10,000
Referee: ?

4R Electrical Ba:
1	(Fiji) Laisenia Tuba
3	(Fiji) Shalen Lal
5	(Fiji) Roneel Kumar	(yellow card) 41'
6	(Fiji) Jone Vesikula
8	(Fiji) Keni Doidoi	(substituted off) 63'
9	(Fiji) Josaia Bukalidi
10	(Fiji) Ronald Chandra	(substituted off) 55'
11	(Fiji) Robert Wise
14	(Fiji) Luke Vidovi
16	(Fiji) Malakai Tiwa
17	(Fiji) Malakai Kainihewe
Substitutes:
2	(Fiji) Avinesh Swamy
4	(Fiji) Leone Vurukania	(substituted on) 90+2'
7	(Fiji) Niumaia Tagi
12	(Fiji) Semesa Doidoi
13	(Fiji) Kiniviliame Kainehewe	(substituted on) 63'
15	(Fiji) Osea Vakatalesau	(substituted on) 55'	(substituted off) 90+2'
Manager:
??

Waitakere United:
GK	1	(New Zealand) Michael Utting
DF	2	(Solomon Islands) George Suri
DF	5	(New Zealand) Danny Hay
FW	8	(Solomon Islands) Commins Menapi
FW	10	(New Zealand) Allen Pearce
FW	11	(Australia) Craig Wylie	(substituted off) 72'
	12	(New Zealand) Jakub Sinkora
MF	13	(Croatia) Danijel Koprivčić	(substituted off) 81'
MF	14	(New Zealand) Hoani Edwards	(substituted off) 73'
DF	19	(New Zealand) Rupesh Puna
FW	23	(New Zealand) Jeff Campbell
Substitutes:
DF	4	(New Zealand) Hone Fowler	(substituted on) 72'
MF	6	(New Zealand) Sam Jasper
FW	9	(Brazil) Pedro Santos	(substituted on) 73'
MF	15	(New Zealand) Prince Quansah
	16	(New Zealand) Michael Gwyther	(substituted on) 81'
DF	21	(New Zealand) Graham Pearce
GK	22	(New Zealand) Simon Eaddy
Manager:
(New Zealand) Chris Milicich

Referee:
(Papua New Guinea) Job Ponis Minan

Assistant referees:
(Vanuatu) Mahit Chilia
(Vanuatu) Michael Joseph
Fourth official:
(Vanuatu) Lencie Fred

April 29, 2007

Waitakere United (New Zealand)	1–0	(Fiji) 4R Electrical Ba
Allan Pearce 55'	(Report)

Mt Smart Stadium, Auckland, New Zealand
Attendance: 9,000
Referee: ?

== Champion ==
OFC Champions League
2007 Winners
(New Zealand)
Waitakere United
First title

== Top goal-scorers ==
#	Player	Team	Goals
1	(Solomon Islands) Commins Menapi	(New Zealand) Waitakere United	5
2	(New Zealand) Daniel Koprivcic	(New Zealand) Waitakere United	4
3	(New Zealand) Paul Urlovic	(New Zealand) Auckland City	3
3	(New Zealand) Grant Young	(New Zealand) Auckland City	3
3	(Solomon Islands) Joe Luwi	(Solomon Islands) Marist	3
Last updated April 29, 2007
