= Matéo Degrumelle =

Tahitian footballer (born 2003)

Personal information
- Date of birth: 22 August 2003 (age 23)
- Place of birth: Rouen, France
- Height: 1.76 m (5 ft 9 in)
- Position: Defender

Team information
- Current team: Tahiti United

Youth career
- –2016: Bois-Guillaume
- 2014–2016: d'Argueil
- 2016–2018: Quevilly-Rouen
- 2018–2022: Amiens

Senior career*
Years	Team	Apps	(Gls)
2021–2023	Amiens II	31	(1)
2022–2023	Amiens	2	(0)
2023–2024	Le Havre II	7	(0)
2024–2026	Quevilly-Rouen	0	(0)
2026–	Tahiti United	1	(0)

International career^{‡}
2023–	Tahiti	13	(5)
Medal record
Men's football
Representing Tahiti
OFC Nations Cup
Third place	2024 Fiji/Vanuatu
- * Club domestic league appearances and goals as of 28 June 2024 ‡ National team caps and goals as of 16:09, 14 November 2026 (UTC)

Matéo Degrumelle (born 22 August 2003) is a professional footballer who plays as a defender for Tahiti United, and the Tahiti national team.

== Club career ==
Degrumelle began playing football at age five. He joined AS Canton d'Argueil at the under-12 level before joining FUSC Bois-Guillaume. After two years with the club, he moved to US Quevilly-Rouen Métropole for another two years. As a youth he also had trials at Reims and Valenciennes.

In 2018, Degrumelle tallied two goals and an assist in a training match against Amiens while playing for Quevilly-Rouen. He impressed Amiens coach John Devignon and joined the club shortly thereafter. Degrumelle's contract with the club expired following the 2022–23 Ligue 2 season. In August 2023, he returned to his native Normandy by signing a one-year contract with Le Havre AC of Ligue 1.

== International career ==
Degrumelle is eligible to represent French Polynesia because his mother is from Raiatea. He was first contacted for a call-up to the Tahiti national team in 2022 while with Amiens, but the club would not release him. He was then called up again in November 2023 for 2023 Pacific Games. After making his debut on 21 November 2023 against Fiji, he scored his first international goal three days later in a 5–0 victory over the Northern Mariana Islands.

=== International goals ===
Scores and results list Tahiti's goal tally first.

No.	Date	Venue	Opponent	Score	Result	Competition
1.	24 November 2023	SIFF Academy Field, Honiara, Solomon Islands	Northern Mariana Islands	4–0	5–0	2023 Pacific Games
2.	16 June 2024	HFC Bank Stadium, Suva, Fiji	Samoa	1–0	2–0	2024 OFC Nations Cup
3.	19 June 2024	HFC Bank Stadium, Suva, Fiji	Papua New Guinea	1–0	1–1	2024 OFC Nations Cup
4.	13 November 2026	Stade Louis Ganivet, Faʼaʼā, French Polynesia	Cook Islands	1–0	4–0	Friendly
5.	13 November 2026	Stade Louis Ganivet, Faʼaʼā, French Polynesia	Cook Islands	4–0	4–0	Friendly
Last updated 19 June 2024

=== International statistics ===
As of match played 14 November 2026

Tahiti
Year	Apps	Goals
2023	4	1
2024	7	2
2025	1	0
2026	1	2
Total	13	5

== Honours ==
- OFC Nations Cup: 3rd place 2024
