= Johann Sidaner =

French football manager

Personal information
- Date of birth: 30 May 1977 (age 49)
- Place of birth: Nantes, France
- Height: 1.73 m (5 ft 8 in)

Managerial career
- Years: Team
- 2006–2011: USSA Vertou
- 2011–2022: Nantes (Youth)
- 2022–2026: New Caledonia
Medal record
Men's football
Representing New Caledonia(as manager)
Pacific Games
Gold medal – first place	2023 Solomon Islands
MSG Prime Minister's Cup
Runner-up	2023 New Caledonia
- ‡ National team caps and goals as of 12:40, 2 October 2023 (UTC)

Johann Sidaner (born 30 May 1977) is a French football manager. He trained as a young football player in FC Nantes until he was 16. Then, at 22 years old, he started his coaching career as a member of USSA Vertou. He enabled this club to access the National 3 Championship. In 2011, he signed with FC Nantes as pre-academy director. In 2016, he enabled his team to win the famous trophy in Mondial Montaigu. In 2019, he was champion of France with his U17 Team by beating Olympique Lyonnais in the semi-final (3-1) and Lille OSC in the final (6-2). Since 2022, he has managed the New Caledonia national team. In December 2023, he won the gold medal during the Pacific Games Sol 2023 with the selection A by beating Vanuatu 1-0 and Solomon Islands 2-2 (9-8) in front of their public for the final win.

== Playing career ==
Sidaner played for local club USSA Vertou.

== Managerial career ==
From 2006 to 2011, Sidaner held roles at USSA Vertou, including head coach in the CFA2. In 2011 he joined the coaching staff of Ligue 1 club FC Nantes. He would spend most of his time at the club coaching the under-16 category, leading the team to the championship in 2019. In summer 2022, Sidaner's contract with Nantes was set to expire. At that time, he was introduced to officials of the New Caledonian Football Federation as the national team was preparing for 2022 FIFA World Cup qualification in Metropolitan France. After several weeks of discussions, Sidaner was named New Caledonia's head coach in late August 2022, ending his eleven-year term at Nantes. He went to work immediately, scouting a Coupe de Calédonie match between AS Lössi and CO Hmelek the day after arriving in the country. He first managed New Caledonia later that month in the 2022 MSG Prime Minister's Cup held in Vanuatu. The team played its opening match against Fiji. Despite having only one day to train and arriving in Vanuatu an hour before kickoff, New Caledonia suffered only a slim 0–1 defeat.

== Managerial record ==
As of match played on 26 March 2026

Managerial record by team and tenure
Team	From	To	Record								Ref
Team	From	To	G	W	D	L	GF	GA	GD	Win %	Ref
New Caledonia	August 2022	13 May 2026	18	11	1	6	40	16	+24	61.11	

== Honours ==
=== Manager ===
New Caledonia

- Pacific Games: Gold Medalist, 2023
- MSG Prime Minister's Cup: Runner-up, 2023
