= A.S. Mira =

Tahitian association football club

AS Mira
- Full name: Association Sportive Mira
- Founded: 1949
- Chairman: Arnaud Bruggmann
- League: Ligue 2 Moorea
- 2019–20: 2nd

Association Sportive Mira is a football club from Papetoai, Moorea, French Polynesia. It currently competes in the Ligue 2 Moorea, the regional league of Moorea. They were the first team from there to compete in Ligue 1, in the season 1999–00.

== Achievements ==
- Ligue 2 Moorea
  - Champions (2): 2014–15, 2018–19

== Last seasons ==
Season	League/position
2012-13	unknown.
2013-14	unknown.
2014-15	1st in Ligue 2 Moorea.
2015-16	4th in Ligue 2 Moorea. Quarter finals of Tahiti Cup.
2016-17	4th in Ligue 2 Moorea. Round 2 of Tahiti Cup.
2017-18	3rd in Ligue 2 Moorea.
2018-19	1st in Ligue 2 Moorea. Quarter finals of Tahiti Cup.
2019-20	2nd in Ligue 2 Moorea. Round 2 of Tahiti Cup.
