= A.S. Temanava =

Tahitian football club

AS Temanava
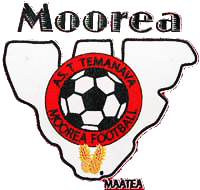
- Full name: Association Sportive Temarii Temanava
- Founded: 1962
- Ground: Stade de Maatea
- Capacity: 2,000
- Chairman: Pierre Vahine
- Manager: Bernard Vahirua
- League: Ligue 2
- 2024-25: 8th

AS Temanava is a football (soccer) club in Ma'atea, Mo'orea, Tahiti. They currently play in the Ligue 2, the second-tier of Tahitian football, after spending several years at the local league of Moorea. They play home games at Stade de Maatea.

The club won the Tahiti Cup in 2006, qualifying to the 2007 OFC Champions League. It's also, so far, the only club from Moorea to win a national football competition in the French Polynesia.

In the continental tournament, Temanava ended on the 2nd position on Group B, earning a draw with the runners-up on that edition, Ba F.C.

== Current squad ==
Squad for the 2019–20 Ligue 2 Moorea

Note: Flags indicate national team as defined under FIFA eligibility rules; some limited exceptions apply. Players may hold more than one non-FIFA nationality.

No.	Pos.	Nation	Player
1	GK	TAH	Haureva Tetuanui
2	DF	TAH	Maraihau Arapari
3	DF	NCL	Rodney Wahéa
4	DF	TAH	Timi Toromona
5	MF	TAH	Teirihau Tapotofarerani
6	DF	TAH	Ramssi Tapotofarerani
7	MF	TAH	Bryan Toromona
8	MF	TAH	Elios Nui
9	FW	NCL	Ruben Wajoka
10	FW	NCL	Makalu Xowi

No.	Pos.	Nation	Player
11	MF	NCL	Yorick Wadehnane
12	DF	TAH	Vaiharuru Tapotofarerani
13	MF	TAH	Peaumatarii Hunter
14	MF	TAH	Faateni Faatau
15	DF	TAH	Ariihau Vahine
16	DF	TAH	Wilfrid Teuruarii
17	GK	TAH	Logan Leduc
18	FW	TAH	Patua Tetuanui
20	FW	TAH	Raihiti Toromona
99	MF	TAH	Vehiatua Lai Lau

== Staff ==
Position	Name
Coach	(French Polynesia) Bernard Vahirua

== Achievements ==
- Ligue 2 Moorea
  - Champions (3): 2009–10, 2015–16, 2019–20
- Tahiti Cup
  - Champions (1): 2006

=== Continental Record ===
Season	Round	Club	Result
2007	Group B	(Solomon Islands) Marist F.C.	2–1
2007	Group B	(Fiji) Ba F.C.	1–1
2007	Group B	(Fiji) Ba F.C.	0–1
2007	Group B	(Solomon Islands) Marist F.C.	0–2

=== Last seasons ===
Season	League/position
2012–13	6th in Tahiti Championship. 1st in Ligue 2 Mooréa. Quarter finals of Tahiti Cup.
2013–14	Quarter finals of Tahiti Cup.
2014–15	2nd in Ligue 2 Mooréa. Quarter finals of Tahiti Cup.
2015–16	2nd in Ligue 2 Mooréa. Round 1 of Coupe de Mooréa. Round 2 of Tahiti Cup.
2016–17	3rd in Ligue 2 Mooréa. Quarter finals of Coupe de Mooréa. Tahiti Cup runners-up.
2017–18	2nd in Ligue 2 Mooréa. Quarter finals of Tahiti Cup. Coupe de Mooréa champions.
2018–19	2nd in Ligue 2 Mooréa. Quarter finals of Tahiti Cup.
2019–20	1st in Ligue 2 Mooréa. Round 2 of Tahiti Cup.
