= A.S. Tiare Anani =

Tahitian association football club

AS Tiare Anani
- Full name: Association Sportive Tiare Anani
- Founded: 1968
- Chairman: Jean-Pierre Tetuanui
- League: Ligue 2 Moorea
- 2019–20: 3rd

Association Sportive Tiare Anani is a football club from Pao Pao, Moorea, French Polynesia. It currently competes in the Ligue 2 Moorea, the regional league of Moorea.

== Last seasons ==
Season	League/position
2012-13	unknown.
2013-14	unknown.
2014-15	5th in Ligue 2 Moorea.
2015-16	5th in Ligue 2 Moorea. Round 2 of Tahiti Cup.
2016-17	5th in Ligue 2 Moorea.
2017-18	6th in Ligue 2 Moorea. Round 2 of Tahiti Cup.
2018-19	5th in Ligue 2 Moorea.
2019-20	3rd in Ligue 2 Moorea. Round 1 of Tahiti Cup.
