= François Hapipi =

Croatian Third Football League player

Personal information
- Full name: François Raphael Hugues Hapipi
- Date of birth: 10 March 1999 (age 27)
- Place of birth: Brest, france
- Height: 1.93 m (6 ft 4 in)
- Position: Defender

Team information
- Current team: Urania

Youth career
- 2008–2009: Pessac Alouette
- 2009–2012: Mérignac-Arlac
- 2012–2013: Bordeaux
- 2013–2019: Mérignac-Arlac

Senior career*
| Years | Team | Apps | (Gls) |
| 2019–2021 | Mérignac-Arlac | 10 | (0) |
| 2021 | Urania | | |

International career
| 2022– | Tahiti | 2 | (0) |
- * Club domestic league appearances and goals

François Raphael Hugues Hapipi (born 10 March 1999) is a footballer who last played as a defender for Urania. Born in France, he is a Tahiti international.

== Career ==
Hapipi began his football career in 2008 and spent one season with hometown club ASC Pessac Alouette. The following year he joined FCE Mérignac Arlac where he stayed until 2012. He then spent one season in the academy of Ligue 1 club FC Girondins de Bordeaux before returning to Mérignac Arlac in 2013.

Hapipi started his career with French fifth tier side Mérignac-Arlac. In 2021, he signed for Urania in the Croatian third tier.

In February 2022 he was selected for the Tahiti national football team for the 2022 FIFA World Cup qualifiers in Qatar.
