= Paolo Hausner =

Tahitian footballer (born 2002)

Personal information
- Date of birth: 21 February 2002 (age 24)
- Place of birth: Santo Domingo, Dominican Republic
- Position: Forward

Youth career
- Jeunes Tahitiens
- Tefana
- 2016–2021: Auxerre

Senior career*
Years	Team	Apps	(Gls)
2022	Saint-Apollinaire	3	(0)
2022–2023	FCM Troyes		
2023–	Saint-Méziéry	50	(21)

International career
2023–	Tahiti	2	(0)
- * Club domestic league appearances and goals

Paolo Hausner (born 21 February 2002) is a semi-professional footballer who plays as a forward for French side Saint-Méziéry. Born in the Dominican Republic, he has represented Tahiti at international level.

== Club career ==
Born in the Dominican Republic, Hausner moved to French Polynesia as a child, spending time on the island of Moʻorea, where he developed an interest in football. Having played for Jeunes Tahitiens and Tefana at youth level, Hausner moved to mainland France, joining the academy of Auxerre in 2016.

Having left Auxerre after five years, he joined Championnat National 3 side Saint-Apollinaire, where he spent half a season before joining Football Club de la Métropole Troyenne. Despite helping FCM Troyes to promotion to the Championnat National 3, he left to join sixth-tier Saint-Méziéry, where he formed a strike partnership with Aurélien Daval.

== International career ==
In February 2023, the Tahitian Football Federation (FTF) reached out to Hausner in order for him to be called up to the national team. He received his first call up in November of the same year, having to miss out on a Coupe de France match for Saint-Méziéry against Tahitian opposition Pirae. He made his debut in the 0–0 2023 Pacific Games draw against Fiji on 21 November.

== Style of play ==
Capable of playing anywhere across the front three, Hausner has stated his best position is on the wing.

== Career statistics ==
=== International ===
As of 23 March 2025.

National team	Year	Apps	Goals
Tahiti	2023	2	0
Tahiti	2024	0	0
Tahiti	2025	0	0
Total		2	0
