= A.S. Mataiea =

Tahitian association football club

AS Mataiea
- Full name: Association Sportive Mataiea
- Chairman: Raimana Taaroa
- League: Tahiti Ligue 2
- 2021–22: 12th, Ligue 1 (relegated to Ligue 2)

Association Sportive Mataiea is a football club from Teva I Uta, Tahiti. It currently competes in the Tahiti Ligue 1 after being promoted from Ligue 2 in 2019–20. The last time the team played in the Tahitian top division was the 2000–01 season.

== Last seasons ==
Season	League/position
2012-13	unknown
2013-14	unknown
2014-15	unknown
2015-16	unknown
2016-17	unknown
2017-18	1st in Ligue 3 - Promoted.
2018-19	5th in Ligue 2.
2019-20	4th in Ligue 2 - Promoted. Quarter finals of Tahiti Cup.

== Current squad ==
Squad for the 2020–21 Tahiti Ligue 1

Note: Flags indicate national team as defined under FIFA eligibility rules; some limited exceptions apply. Players may hold more than one non-FIFA nationality.

No.	Pos.	Nation	Player
1	GK	(French Polynesia) TAH	Iotua Mariterangi
3	DF	(French Polynesia) TAH	Pascal Terorotua
4	DF	(French Polynesia) TAH	Stellio Vahiatua Ariioehau
5		(French Polynesia) TAH	Tamatoa Souche
6	MF	(French Polynesia) TAH	Tunui Pihaatae
7	FW	(French Polynesia) TAH	Amaiterai Doom
8	MF	(French Polynesia) TAH	Aldi Paariotare
9	DF	(French Polynesia) TAH	Heifara Mau

No.	Pos.	Nation	Player
10	FW	(French Polynesia) TAH	Tamatoa Barry Tauihara
13	MF	(French Polynesia) TAH	Bryan Matoarii Arava Bernadino
14		(French Polynesia) TAH	Alexis Tcheou
15		(French Polynesia) TAH	Augustin Tamarono
17		(French Polynesia) TAH	Tuki Teanau
18	FW	(French Polynesia) TAH	Rangitea Bennett
20	MF	(French Polynesia) TAH	Marcel Paariotare
22	GK	(French Polynesia) TAH	Dimitri Alexandre
