= Ligue 2 Moorea =

- Organising body: Tahitian Football Federation
- Country: Tahiti
- Region: Moorea
- Number of clubs: 7
- Level on pyramid: 3
- Promotion to: Tahiti Ligue 2
- Domestic cup: Tahiti Cup
- Current champions: A.S. Temanava (2022-23)
- Current: 2022-23 Ligue 2 Moorea

The Ligue 2 Moorea is the regional league for association football of the island of Moorea, in French Polynesia. It is considered to be a third-tier league. Teams from this league are promoted directly to the Tahiti Ligue 2. Teams in this league also are able to take part in the Tahiti Cup.

This league started in the 2001/02 season in which A.S. Tiare Hinano were crowned the first champions. The most current champion, A.S. Temanava have won at least 3 league titles which are known.

== Teams ==
These are the teams for the 2022–23 Ligue 2 Moorea season:

- A.S. Mira
- A.S. Tamarii Tapuhute
- A.S. Temanava
- A.S. Tiare Anani
- A.S. Tiare Hinano
- Tiare Tahiti
- A.S. Tohie'a

== League Table (2022-23) ==
Ligue 2 Moorea League Table (2022-23)
Position	Club	Matches Played	Points	Won	Drew	Lost	Goals Scored	Goals Against	Goal Difference
1	A.S. Temanava	12	50	11	1	0	51	14	37
2	Tiare Tahiti	12	37	7	2	3	43	13	30
3	A.S. Tiare Hinano	12	27	3	5	4	33	24	9
4	A.S. Mira	12	27	5	2	5	31	32	-1
5	A.S. Tohie'a	12	27	4	1	7	17	37	-20
6	A.S. Tiare Anani	12	21	3	6	3	17	20	-3
7	A.S. Tamarii Tapuhute	12	14	0	1	11	8	60	-52

[Table Reference ]

== Last champions ==
- 2001/02: A.S. Tiare Hinano
- 2002/03: unknown
- 2003/04: unknown
- 2004/05: unknown
- 2005/06: Tiare Tahiti
- 2006/07: Tiare Tahiti
- 2007/08: A.S. Tapuhute
- 2008/09: Tiare Tahiti
- 2009-10: A.S. Temanava
- 2010-11: unknown
- 2011-12: unknown
- 2012-13: unknown
- 2013-14: Tiare Tahiti
- 2014-15: A.S. Mira
- 2015-16: Tiare Tahiti
- 2016-17: Tiare Tahiti
- 2017-18: Tiare Tahiti
- 2018-19: A.S. Mira
- 2019-20: A.S. Temanava
- 2020-21: unknown
- 2021-22: unknown
- 2022-23: A.S. Temanava
