= CO Hmelek =

- Full name: Club Omnisports de Hmelek Loisirs
- Founded: 1997 August 17; 27 years ago
- League: Promotion d'Honneur Sud
- 2022: 6th, Sud
- Website: https://www.facebook.com/p/COH-Noum%C3%A9a-100064380780048/

CO Hmelek is a New Caledonian association football club based in Nouméa currently playing in the Promotion d'Honneur Sud.

== History ==
The club was created on 17 August 1997. It competed in the 2022 Coupe de Calédonie in a match against AS Lössi.
