= A.S. Pueu =

Tahitian association football club

AS Pueu
- Full name: Association Sportive Pueu
- Founded: as AS Taravao
- Ground: Stade Teahupoo; Taiarapu-Ouest, French Polynesia
- Capacity: 1,000
- Chairman: Miriama Auraa
- League: Tahiti Ligue 1
- 2024–25: 8th

Association Sportive Pueu, formerly known as Association Sportive Taravao, is a football club from Taiarapu-Est, Tahiti. It currently competes in the Tahiti Ligue 1. They last compete on Ligue 1 in the season 2009/10.

== Last seasons ==
Season	League/position
2012-13	1st in Ligue 2; lost play-offs. Preliminary round of Tahiti Cup.
2013-14	5th in Ligue 2. Round 1 of Tahiti Cup.
2014-15	8th in Ligue 2.
2015-16	5th in Ligue 2. Round 1 of Tahiti Cup.
2016-17	unknown
2017-18	unknown.
2018-19	1st in Ligue 2 - Promoted.
2019-20	7th in Ligue 1. Qualified to semifinals of Tahiti Cup.

== Current squad ==
Squad for the 2020–21 Tahiti Ligue 1

Note: Flags indicate national team as defined under FIFA eligibility rules; some limited exceptions apply. Players may hold more than one non-FIFA nationality.

No.	Pos.	Nation	Player
1	GK	(French Polynesia) TAH	François Decoret
4	DF	(French Polynesia) TAH	Teuaura Teihoarii
5	DF	(French Polynesia) TAH	Tepano Teikitutoua
6	MF	(French Polynesia) TAH	Vaiarii Pater
8		(French Polynesia) TAH	Teariki Dupond
10	MF	(French Polynesia) TAH	Jason Papaura
11	FW	(French Polynesia) TAH	Orlando Teiva
13	DF	(French Polynesia) TAH	Teihoarii Tupahururu
14	MF	(French Polynesia) TAH	Tehotu Doom

No.	Pos.	Nation	Player
15	DF	(French Polynesia) TAH	Tiniarii Parker
17	DF	(French Polynesia) TAH	Harrison Apuarii
18	FW	(French Polynesia) TAH	Yohann Tihoni
19		(French Polynesia) TAH	Hitinui Warren
20	FW	(French Polynesia) TAH	Taieana Teihoarii
21	MF	(French Polynesia) TAH	Raihiti Teamo
24		(French Polynesia) TAH	Steven Miria
27	MF	(French Polynesia) TAH	Louis Petitgas
