= 2021 OFC U-17 Championship =

Tournament details
- Host country: Fiji
- Dates: Cancelled
- Teams: 10 (from 1 confederation)

The 2021 OFC U-17 Championship, originally to be held as the 2020 OFC U-16 Championship, was originally to be the 19th edition of the OFC U-16/U-17 Championship, the biennial international youth football championship organised by the Oceania Football Confederation (OFC) for the men's under-16/under-17 national teams of Oceania.

The tournament was originally scheduled to be held in Fiji in September 2020. However, on 28 July 2020, the OFC announced that the tournament had been postponed to April 2021 due to the COVID-19 pandemic, provisionally between 10 and 25 April 2021, with the name of the tournament changed from "2020 OFC U-16 Championship" to "2021 OFC U-17 Championship". On 16 December 2020, the OFC announced the tournament had been postponed but would be required to be completed by 5 July 2021, the deadline for team nominations at the 2021 FIFA U-17 World Cup in Peru, scheduled for September 2021, of which the top two teams of the tournament would have qualified for as the OFC representatives.

Following FIFA's decision to cancel the 2021 FIFA U-17 World Cup on 24 December 2020, the OFC announced on 18 January 2021 that the tournament would remain on track to be held in 2021, with the new dates to be decided in the coming months. However, on 4 March 2021, the OFC announced that the tournament had been cancelled, and Fiji would be retained to host the next edition in 2022.

New Zealand were the seven-time defending champions.

== Teams ==
Ten of the 11 FIFA-affiliated national teams from the OFC were eligible to enter the tournament. The Solomon Islands were banned from entering a team in this edition due to fielding at least one ineligible player in the 2018 OFC U-16 Championship.

Starting from this edition, male youth tournaments would no longer have a four-team qualifying stage, and all teams would compete in one tournament.

Note: All appearance statistics include those in the qualifying stage (2017 and 2018).

Team	Appearance (planned)	Previous best performance
American Samoa	9th	Group stage (1999, 2001, 2003, 2011, 2015)
Cook Islands	10th	Group stage (1997, 1999, 2003, 2005, 2011, 2013, 2015)
Fiji (hosts)	18th	Runners-up (1999)
New Caledonia	12th	Runners-up (2003, 2013, 2017)
New Zealand	17th	Champions (1997, 2007, 2009, 2011, 2013, 2015, 2017, 2018)
Papua New Guinea	10th	Semi-finals (2017), Fourth place (1986)
Samoa	9th	Group stage (1997, 1999, 2001, 2003, 2015, 2017, 2018)
Tahiti	14th	Runners-up (2007, 2009, 2011, 2015)
Tonga	10th	Group stage (1999, 2001, 2003, 2005, 2011, 2015)
Vanuatu	15th	Runners-up (2005)

Banned

- Solomon Islands

== Squads ==
Players born on or after 1 January 2004 were eligible to compete in the tournament.
