= 2023 OFC U-17 Championship =

Tournament details
- Host country: Fiji
- Dates: 11–28 January
- Teams: 9 (from 1 confederation)
- Venue: 2 (in 2 host cities)

Final positions
- Champions: New Zealand (9th title)
- Runners-up: New Caledonia
- Third place: Tahiti
- Fourth place: Fiji

Tournament statistics
- Matches played: 17
- Goals scored: 71 (4.18 per match)
- Attendance: 3,985 (234 per match)
- Top scorer(s): (New Zealand) Luke Supyk (French Polynesia) Titouan Guillemant (6 goals each)
- Best player: (New Caledonia) Nolhann Alabete
- Best goalkeeper: (New Zealand) Matt Foord

The 2023 OFC U-17 Championship was the 19th edition of the OFC U-16/U-17 Championship, the biennial international youth football championship organised by the Oceania Football Confederation (OFC) for the men's under-16/under-17 national teams of Oceania.

The OFC announced on 4 March 2021 that the 2021 OFC U-17 Championship (originally the 2020 OFC U-16 Championship), which would have been hosted by Fiji, had been cancelled due to the COVID-19 pandemic, and Fiji would be retained to host the next edition in 2022.

New Zealand, the seven-time defending champions, successfully defend their title, by won 1–0 the final over New Caledonia and both teams qualified for the 2023 FIFA U-17 World Cup in Indonesia as the OFC representatives.

== Teams ==
10 of the 11 FIFA-affiliated national teams from the OFC were eligible to enter the tournament. Solomon Islands were excluded from taking part by the OFC Disciplinary and Ethics Committee in regards to the 2018 OFC U-16 Championship.

Starting from 2020, male youth tournaments no longer have a four-team qualifying stage, and all teams compete in one tournament.

Note: All appearance statistics include those in the qualifying stage (2016 and 2018).

Team	Appearance	Previous best performance
American Samoa	9th	Group stage (1999, 2001, 2003, 2011, 2015)
Cook Islands	10th	Group stage (1997, 1999, 2003, 2005, 2011, 2013, 2015)
Fiji (hosts)	18th	Runners-up (1999)
New Caledonia	12th	Runners-up (2003, 2013, 2017)
New Zealand	17th	Champions (1997, 2007, 2009, 2011, 2013, 2015, 2017, 2018)
~~Papua New Guinea~~	10th	Semi-finals (2017), Fourth place (1986)
Samoa	9th	Group stage (1997, 1999, 2001, 2003, 2015, 2017, 2018)
Tahiti	14th	Runners-up (2007, 2009, 2011, 2015)
Tonga	10th	Group stage (1999, 2001, 2003, 2005, 2011, 2015)
Vanuatu	15th	Runners-up (2005)

== Venues ==
Matches are played at HFC Bank Stadium in Suva and Ba Academy in Ba.

== Match officials ==
The following officials were appointed for the tournament:

Referees

- (Australia) Timothy Danaskos
- (Australia) Lachlan Keevers
- (Fiji) Kavitesh Behari
- (Fiji) Veer Singh
- (New Caledonia) Mederic Lacour
- (New Zealand) Calvin Berg
- (New Zealand) Nick Waldron
- (Papua New Guinea) David Yareboinen
- (Solomon Islands) Ben Aukwai
- (Solomon Islands) Timothy Niu
- (Vanuatu) Arnold Tari

Assistant referees

- (Fiji) Adriu Naisiroki
- (New Caledonia) Alan Chenot
- (New Zealand) Gareth Sheehan
- (Papua New Guinea) Noah Kusunan
- (Papua New Guinea) Stephanie Minan
- (Samoa) Malaetala Salanoa
- (Solomon Islands) Natalia Lumukana
- (Solomon Islands) Jeffrey Solodia
- (Tonga) Folio Moeaki
- (Vanuatu) Jeremy Garae
- (Vanuatu) Hilmon Sese

== Group stage draw ==
The draw for the group stage was conducted at the OFC Home of Football on the 28 October 2022. Teams were seeded into three pots based on their 2018 OFC U-16 Championship ranking.

Pot 1	Pot 2	Pot 3
New Zealand; Tahiti; Fiji	~~Papua New Guinea~~; New Caledonia; Samoa; Vanuatu	American Samoa; Tonga; Cook Islands

== Squads ==
Players born on or after 1 January 2006 were eligible to compete in the tournament.

== Group stage ==
All times are local, FJT (UTC+12).

=== Group A ===
Papua New Guinea were originally drawn into position A3 of this group but were removed before the start of the tournament due to not submitting their registration on time.

Pos	Team	Pld	W	D	L	GF	GA	GD	Pts	Qualification
1	Fiji (H)	2	2	0	0	6	0	+6	6	Knockout stage
2	Samoa	2	1	0	1	6	3	+3	3	Knockout stage
3	Tonga	2	0	0	2	0	9	−9	0	Knockout stage

Source: OFC
(H) Hosts
12 January 2023
19:00

Fiji	3–0	Samoa
Khan 28'; Kumar 49'; Rao 60' (pen.)	Report

HFC Bank Stadium, Suva
Attendance: 320
Referee: Calvin Berg (New Zealand)

15 January 2023
16:00

Samoa	6–0	Tonga
Edward 20', 40'; Trainor 23', 25', 70', 85'	Report

HFC Bank Stadium, Suva
Attendance: 100
Referee: Nick Waldron (New Zealand)

18 January 2023
19:00

Tonga	0–3	Fiji
	Report	Seninawanawa 7'; Azafal 50'; Khan 90'

HFC Bank Stadium, Suva
Attendance: 275
Referee: Ben Aukwai (Solomon Islands)

=== Group B ===
Pos	Team	Pld	W	D	L	GF	GA	GD	Pts	Qualification
1	New Zealand	2	2	0	0	14	2	+12	6	Knockout stage
2	New Caledonia	2	1	0	1	9	3	+6	3	Knockout stage
3	American Samoa	2	0	0	2	0	18	−18	0	

Source: OFC
11 January 2023
15:00

New Zealand	3–2	New Caledonia
Supyk 9', 72' (pen.), 75'	Report	Nganyane 16'; Hnaissilin 69' (pen.)

Fiji FA Academy, Ba
Attendance: 80
Referee: Kavitesh Behari (Fiji)

14 January 2023
15:00

American Samoa	0–11	New Zealand
	Report	Edwards 4'; Sloane-Rodrigues 11', 68'; Flowerdew 38', 45+2', 70', 88'; D'Hotman de Villiers 42', 76', 90+1'; Supyk 87' (pen.)

Fiji FA Academy, Ba
Attendance: 50
Referee: David Yareboinen (Papua New Guinea)

17 January 2023
15:00

New Caledonia	7–0	American Samoa
Alebate 4'; Levy 27' (pen.); Ue 53'; Cahma 59'; Saiko 64'; Qaeze 68', 70'	Report

Fiji FA Academy, Ba
Attendance: 20
Referee: Veer Singh (Fiji)

=== Group C ===
Pos	Team	Pld	W	D	L	GF	GA	GD	Pts	Qualification
1	Tahiti	2	2	0	0	8	1	+7	6	Knockout stage
2	Vanuatu	2	1	0	1	3	3	0	3	Knockout stage
3	Cook Islands	2	0	0	2	1	8	−7	0	Knockout stage

Source: OFC
11 January 2023
19:00

Tahiti	2–1	Vanuatu
Guillemant 24'; Timothy 36' (o.g.)	Report	Judah 82'

HFC Bank Stadium, Suva
Attendance: 100
Referee: Lachlan Keevers (Australia)

14 January 2023
19:00

Cook Islands	0–6	Tahiti
	Report	Colombani 22', 45+2'; Guillemant 53'; Rota 66'; Cadousteau 74' (pen.); Martin 78'

HFC Bank Stadium, Suva
Attendance: 50
Referee: Tim Danaskos (Australia)

17 January 2023
19:00

Vanuatu	2–1	Cook Islands
Chilia 1'; Moso 47'	Report	Williams 45+2'

HFC Bank Stadium, Suva
Attendance: 120
Referee: Timothy Niu (Solomon Islands)

=== Ranking of third-placed teams ===
Pos	Grp	Team	Pld	W	D	L	GF	GA	GD	Pts	Qualification
1	C	Cook Islands	2	0	0	2	1	8	−7	0	Knockout stage
2	A	Tonga	2	0	0	2	0	9	−9	0	Knockout stage
3	B	American Samoa	2	0	0	2	0	18	−18	0	

Source: OFC

== Knockout stage ==
=== Draw ===
The draw for the knockout stage was conducted at the HFC Bank Stadium in Suva on the 18 January 2023. Teams were seeded into two pots based on the final group stage overall ranking.

Pot 1	Pot 2
New Zealand; Tahiti; Fiji; New Caledonia	Samoa; Vanuatu; Cook Islands; Tonga

=== Bracket ===
Quarter-finals
21 January – Suva
New Caledonia	4
Samoa	0
21 January – Suva
Tahiti	5
Tonga	0
22 January – Suva
Fiji	3
Cook Islands	0
22 January – Suva
New Zealand	1
Vanuatu	0

Semi-finals
25 January – Suva
New Caledonia (p)	1 (3)
Tahiti	1 (2)
25 January – Suva
Fiji	1
New Zealand	4

Final
28 January – Suva
New Caledonia	0
New Zealand	1
Third place match
28 January – Suva
Tahiti	3
Fiji	0

=== Quarter-finals ===
21 January 2023
16:00

New Caledonia	4–0	Samoa
Angexetine 13'; Alebate 45+3' (pen.); Saiko 88'; Hmuine 90+6' (pen.)	Report

HFC Bank Stadium, Suva
Attendance: 70
Referee: Lachlan Keevers (Australia)

21 January 2023
19:00

Tahiti	5–0	Tonga
Hutia 18'; Guillemant 32', 90+5'; Faure 68'; Vonbalou 78'	Report

HFC Bank Stadium, Suva
Attendance: 100
Referee: Kavitesh Behari (Fiji)

22 January 2023
16:00

Fiji	3–0	Cook Islands
Maivalenisau 45+2', 90+3'; Matapo 50' (o.g.)	Report

HFC Bank Stadium, Suva
Attendance: 350
Referee: David Yareboinen (Papua New Guinea)

22 January 2023
19:00

New Zealand	1–0	Vanuatu
Supyk 90+1' (pen.)	Report

HFC Bank Stadium, Suva
Attendance: 400
Referee: Veer Singh (Fiji)

=== Semi-finals ===
Winners qualified for 2023 FIFA U-17 World Cup.

25 January 2023
16:00

New Caledonia	1–1	Tahiti
Alebate 14'	Report	Guillemant 30'
Penalties
Hanye (penalty missed); Alebate (penalty scored); Diko (penalty scored); Saiko (penalty scored)	3–2	(penalty missed) Cadousteau; (penalty scored) Guillemant; (penalty scored) Cuneo; (penalty missed) Tamarii; (penalty missed) Teuira

HFC Bank Stadium, Suva
Attendance: 250
Referee: Calvin Berg (New Zealand)

25 January 2023
19:00

Fiji	1–4	New Zealand
Ravonokula 14'	Report	Watson 7', 50', 80'; Supyk 72'

HFC Bank Stadium, Suva
Attendance: 1,000
Referee: Ben Aukwai (Solomon Islands)

=== Third place match ===
28 January 2023
16:00

Tahiti	3–0	Fiji
Seguy 51'; Guillemant 56'; Tama 68'	Report

HFC Bank Stadium, Suva
Attendance: 500
Referee: Calvin Berg (New Zealand)

=== Final ===
28 January 2023
19:00

New Caledonia	0–1	New Zealand
	Report	Bruce 24'

HFC Bank Stadium, Suva
Attendance: 200
Referee: Veer Singh (Fiji)

== Awards ==
The following awards were given at the conclusion of the tournament.

Award	Player
Golden Ball	(New Caledonia) Nolhann Alabete
Golden Boot	(New Zealand) Luke Supyk (French Polynesia) Titouan Guillemant
Golden Gloves	(New Zealand) Matt Foord

== Goalscorers ==
There were 71 goals scored in 17 matches, for an average of 4.18 goals per match.

6 goals

- (New Zealand) Luke Supyk
- (French Polynesia) Titouan Guillemant

4 goals

- (New Zealand) Luke Flowerdew
- (Samoa) Pharrell Trainor

3 goals

- (New Caledonia) Nolhann Alebate
- (New Zealand) Matthew d'Hotman de Villiers
- (New Zealand) Adam Watson

2 goals

- (Fiji) William Khan
- (Fiji) Petero Maivalenisau
- (New Caledonia) Sipane Qaeze
- (New Caledonia) Jean-Yves Saiko
- (New Zealand) Gabriel Sloane-Rodrigues
- (Samoa) Ethelbert Edward
- (French Polynesia) Tiahiti Colombani

1 goal

- (Cook Islands) Jeremiah Williams
- (Fiji) Ibraheem Azafal
- (Fiji) Prashant Kumar
- (Fiji) Vinayak Rao
- (Fiji) Sailimone Ravonokula
- (Fiji) Jacob Seninawanawa
- (New Caledonia) Jean-Philippe Angexetine
- (New Caledonia) David Cahma
- (New Caledonia) Iwatro Hmuine
- (New Caledonia) Joseph Hnaissilin
- (New Caledonia) Anthony Levy
- (New Caledonia) Ronald Nganyane
- (New Caledonia) Simon Ue
- (New Zealand) Niko Bruce
- (New Zealand) Jesper Edwards
- (French Polynesia) Eden Cadousteau
- (French Polynesia) Keanan Faure
- (French Polynesia) Dylan Hutia
- (French Polynesia) Teriitaumatatini Martin
- (French Polynesia) Tuarii Rota
- (French Polynesia) Vaitea Seguy
- (French Polynesia) Ariiheivarau Tama
- (French Polynesia) Turerearii Vonbalou
- (Vanuatu) Augustine Chilia
- (Vanuatu) Delickson Judah
- (Vanuatu) Jimmy Moso

1 own goal

- (Cook Islands) Dwayne Matapo (against Fiji)
- (Vanuatu) Albert Timothy (against Tahiti)

== Qualified teams for FIFA U-17 World Cup ==
The following two teams from OFC qualified for the 2023 FIFA U-17 World Cup in Indonesia.

Team	Qualified on	Previous appearances in FIFA U-17 World Cup^{1}
New Caledonia	25 January 2023	1 (2017)
New Zealand	25 January 2023	9 (1997, 1999, 2007, 2009, 2011, 2013, 2015, 2017, 2019)

^{1} Bold indicates champions for that year. Italic indicates hosts for that year.
