= American Samoa national under-17 football team =

National U-17 team of American Samoa

American Samoa U17
- Nickname: The Boys from the territory
- Association: Football Federation American Samoa (FFAS)
- Confederation: OFC (Oceania)
- Head coach: (Fiji) Rupeni Luvu
- Captain: Gabriel Taumua
- Most caps: Rueben Luvu & Joseph Purcell (7)
- Top scorer: Sinisa Tua & Gabriel Taumua (4)
- Home stadium: Veterans Memorial Stadium
- FIFA code: ASA
First colors	Second colors

First international
- PNG 8 – 0 American Samoa (Fiji; May 1, 1999)

Biggest win
- Cook Islands 0 – 3 American Samoa (Apia, Samoa; January 24, 2013)

Biggest defeat
- Australia 30 – 0 American Samoa (Apia, Samoa; December 5, 2001)

World Cup
- Appearances: 0

OFC Under-17 Championship
- Appearances: 8 (first in 1999)
- Best result: Group Stage, 6 times

The American Samoa national under-17 football team is the national U-17 team of American Samoa and is controlled by Football Federation American Samoa.

== Competition Record ==
=== OFC U-17 Championship record ===
The OFC U-17 Championship is a tournament held once every two years to decide the only two qualification spots for the Oceania Football Confederation (OFC) and its representatives at the FIFA U-17 World Cup.

OFC U-17 Championship								Qualification record					
Year	Round	Pld	W	D	L	GF	GA	Pld	W	D	L	GF	GA
(New Zealand) 1983	Did not enter							No qualification					
(Chinese Taipei) 1986	Did not enter							No qualification					
(Australia) 1989	Did not enter							No qualification					
(New Zealand) 1991	Did not enter							No qualification					
(New Zealand) 1993	Did not enter							No qualification					
(Vanuatu) 1995	Did not enter							No qualification					
(New Zealand) 1997	Did not enter							No qualification					
(Fiji) 1999	Group stage	5	0	1	4	3	44	No qualification					
(Samoa) (Vanuatu) 2001	Group stage	4	0	0	4	3	53	No qualification					
(American Samoa) (Australia) (New Caledonia) 2003	Group stage	4	0	1	3	1	14	No qualification					
(New Caledonia) 2005	Withdrew							No qualification					
(French Polynesia) 2007	Did not enter							No qualification					
(New Zealand) 2009	Did not enter							No qualification					
(New Zealand) 2011	Group stage	4	0	0	4	1	22	No qualification					
(Samoa) (Vanuatu) 2013	Did not qualify							3	1	1	1	7	5
(American Samoa) (Samoa) 2015	Group stage	4	0	0	4	0	39	No qualification					
(Samoa) (French Polynesia) 2017	Did not qualify							3	0	0	3	1	8
(Tonga) (Solomon Islands) 2018	Did not qualify							3	1	1	1	8	13
(Fiji) 2023	Group stage	2	0	0	2	0	18	No qualification					
(Tonga) (French Polynesia) 2024	Did not qualify							3	0	0	3	1	12
(Tonga) (Solomon Islands) 2025	Did not qualify							3	0	1	2	3	14
Total	Group stage	23	0	2	21	6	190	15	2	3	10	20	52

=== FIFA U-17 World Cup record ===
FIFA U-17 World Cup record
Year	Round	Pld	W	D	L	GF	GA	GD	Pts
(New Zealand) 1999 to (Finland) 2003	Did not qualify								
(Peru) 2005	Withdrew								
(South Korea) 2007 to (Nigeria) 2009	Did not participate								
(Mexico) 2011 to (Qatar) 2025	Did not qualify								
(Qatar) 2026	To be determined								
Total	-	0	0	0	0	0	0	0	0

== Current squad ==
The following players have been called up for the squad for the 2023 OFC U-17 Championship from 11 to 28 January 2023.

Caps and goals as of 18 January 2023 after the game against New Caledonia.

No.	Pos.	Player	Date of birth (age)	Caps	Goals	Club
1	GK	Felise Fata	23 January 2006 (age 20)	1	0	(Football Federation American Samoa) PanSa East
23	GK	Alex Mose	9 September 2006 (age 20)	2	0	(Football Federation American Samoa) Tafuna Jets
2	DF	August Grey	15 April 2006 (age 20)	2	0	(Football Federation American Samoa) Green Bay
3	DF	Samu Emani	25 August 2006 (age 20)	1	0	(Football Federation American Samoa) PanSa East
4	DF	Pedro Kuresa	11 April 2006 (age 20)	2	0	(Football Federation American Samoa) Black Roses
5	DF	Pela Scanlan	24 January 2006 (age 20)	2	0	(Football Federation American Samoa) Pago Youth
13	DF	Richard Niko	18 July 2006 (age 20)	1	0	(Football Federation American Samoa) Green Bay
15	DF	Stidolph Maile	7 April 2006 (age 20)	0	0	(Football Federation American Samoa) Lion Heart
16	DF	Setefano Tuailemafua	15 November 2007 (age 18)	2	0	(Football Federation American Samoa) Black Roses
6	MF	Robert Coulter	1 January 2006 (age 20)	2	0	(Football Federation American Samoa) Ilaoa and To'omata
7	MF	Dylan Salapu	31 August 2008 (age 18)	2	0	(Football Federation American Samoa) Pago Youth
8	MF	Malofou Leatualevao	7 May 2006 (age 20)	2	0	(Football Federation American Samoa) Ilaoa and To'omata
9	MF	Ben Tofeaono	18 March 2006 (age 20)	2	0	(Football Federation American Samoa) Ilaoa and To'omata
17	MF	Edward Loke	26 May 2006 (age 20)	1	0	(Football Federation American Samoa) PanSa East
18	MF	Ajalon Fuimaono	17 May 2006 (age 20)	2	0	(Football Federation American Samoa) Royal Puma
10	FW	Johnica Collins	12 January 2006 (age 20)	2	0	(Football Federation American Samoa) Pago Youth
11	FW	Elson Utoaluga	27 November 2007 (age 18)	2	0	(Football Federation American Samoa) Royal Puma
12	FW	Fiamatai Itamua	27 May 2007 (age 19)	2	0	(Football Federation American Samoa) PanSa East
14	FW	Daniel Lee	17 February 2007 (age 19)	2	0	(Football Federation American Samoa) Royal Puma

== List Of Coaches ==
- (Fiji) Rupeni Luvu (2011)
- (Samoa) Junior Mikaele (2013)
- (American Samoa) Uinifareti Aliva (2015)
- (American Samoa) Frederick Maiava (2016)
- (Fiji) Rupeni Luvu (2018–)

== See also ==
- American Samoa national football team
- American Samoa national under-23 football team
- American Samoa national under-20 football team
- American Samoa women's national football team
- American Samoa women's national under-17 football team
