= Pharrell Trainor =

Footballer (born 2006)

Personal information
- Date of birth: 20 June 2006 (age 20)
- Place of birth: Australia
- Height: 1.89 m (6 ft 2 in)
- Position: Forward

Team information
- Current team: Charlestown Azzurri

Youth career
- 2020–2021: Charlestown Azzurri
- 2021–2022: Valentine Eleebana
- 2022–2023: Newcastle Jets
- 2023–2024: Viktoria 06 Griesheim
- 2024–2025: Schott Mainz

Senior career*
| Years | Team | Apps | (Gls) |
| 2023 | Newcastle Jets Youth | 1 | (0) |
| 2025 | Maitland FC | 5 | (0) |
| 2026– | Charlestown Azzurri | 9 | (1) |

International career^{‡}
| 2023 | Samoa U17 | 3 | (4) |
| 2023– | Samoa | 8 | (2) |
- * Club domestic league appearances and goals as of 14:35, 25 November 2023 (UTC) ‡ National team caps and goals as of 15:25, 18 November 2024 (UTC)

Pharrell Trainor (born 20 June 2006) is a professional footballer who plays as a forward for Regionalliga Südwest club TSV Schott Mainz. Born in Australia, he plays for the Samoa national team.

== Club career ==
At the beginning of the 2021 season, Trainor moved from Charlestown Azzurri to the U15 squad of Valentine Eleebana. In July 2021, he was selected to represent Northern NSW Football at the National Youth Championships. In September of that year, he was selected to join the academy of A-League Men club Newcastle Jets. He was a member of the Jets U18s as they prepared for the upcoming FNSW Boys Youth League One season in February 2023. In October 2023, he was selected to join the squad of SC Viktoria 06 Griesheim in Germany. In the summer transfer window of 2024 Pharrell signed a one-year contract with TSV Schott Mainz.

== International career ==
Born in Australia, Trainor is of Samoan heritage. His family is from the village of Magiagi Tai and he is the nephew of Satiu Simativa Perese, Chief Justice of Samoa. He was selected to captain the national U17 team in the 2023 OFC U-17 Championship. He went on to score four goals in a victory over Tonga as Samoa advanced to the knockout stage. He made his senior international debut on November 17, 2023, in a 1–0 defeat to the Solomon Islands at the 2023 Pacific Games. In the team's next match, Trainor converted a penalty en route to a 10–0 victory over American Samoa.

== Career statistics ==
=== International goals ===
Scores and results list the Samoa's goal tally first.

| No. | Date | Venue | Opponent | Score | Result | Competition |
|---|---|---|---|---|---|---|
| 1. | 20 November 2023 | Lawson Tama Stadium, Honiara, Solomon Islands | American Samoa | 3–0 | 10–0 | 2023 Pacific Games |
| 2. | 22 June 2024 | HFC Bank Stadium, Suva, Fiji | Papua New Guinea | 1–2 | 1–2 | 2024 OFC Nations Cup |
Last updated 22 June 2024

=== International career statistics ===
As of match played 18 November 2024

Samoa national team
| Year | Apps | Goals |
|---|---|---|
| 2023 | 3 | 1 |
| 2024 | 5 | 1 |
| Total | 8 | 2 |
