= Kristian Sarkies =

Australian soccer player (born 1986)

Kristan Sarkies
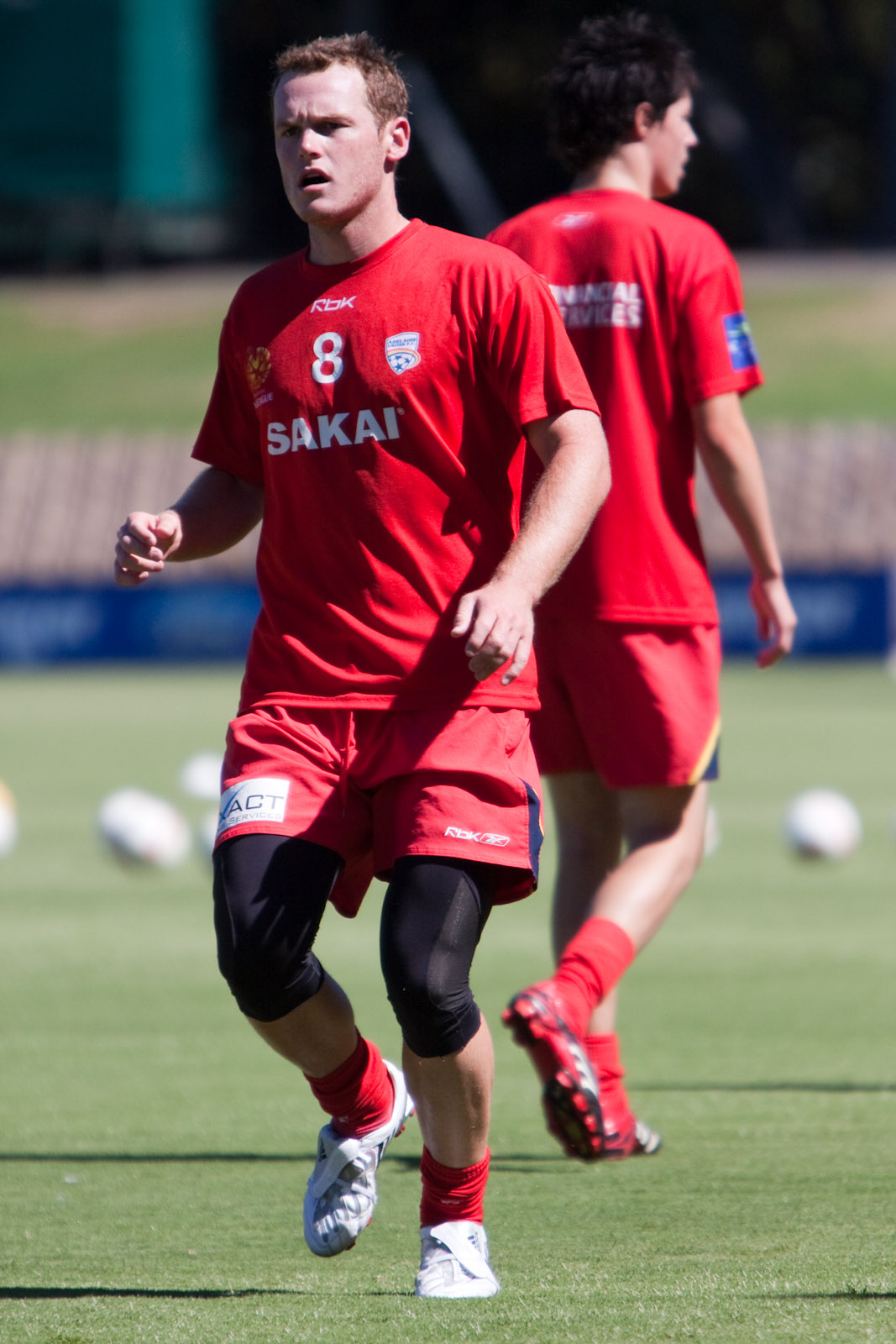
- Sarkies playing for Adelaide United in 2010

Personal information
- Full name: Kristian Ronald Sarkies
- Date of birth: 25 October 1986 (age 39)
- Place of birth: Melbourne, Australia
- Height: 1.60 m (5 ft 3 in)
- Position: Attacking midfielder

Team information
- Current team: Sandringham SC (Metro League Team)

Youth career
- Dingley
- Moorabbin
- 2002–2003: VIS

Senior career*
Years	Team	Apps	(Gls)
2003–2004	South Melbourne	17	(1)
2005–2007	Melbourne Victory	35	(3)
2007–2010	Adelaide United	33	(2)
2010–2012	Melbourne Heart	12	(2)
2012	Heidelberg United	13	(5)
2013	Port Melbourne Sharks	6	(2)
2013	Bulleen Lions	9	(3)
2014	Goulburn Valley Suns	8	(2)
2014	Bulleen Lions	5	(0)
2016–2017	Dandenong Thunder	50	(8)
2018–2019	Beaumaris SC	18	(3)
2022–	Sandringham SC (Metro League Team)	5	(5)

International career^{‡}
2003	Australia U17	13	(4)
2004–2005	Australia U20	14	(6)
2006–2008	Australia U23	21	(8)
2006–2008	Australia	2	(0)
- * Club domestic league appearances and goals as of 7 August 2022 ‡ National team caps and goals as of 17:30, 20 November 2010 (UTC)

Kristian Ronald Sarkies (born 25 October 1986) is an Australian soccer player who plays as an attacking midfielder for Sandringham SC in the Victorian Metropolitan League 1. His previous spells include at A-League clubs Melbourne Victory, Adelaide United and Melbourne Heart. More recently he has played in the NPL.

== Club career ==
=== South Melbourne ===
Sarkies was born in Melbourne, Australia. He grew up in Dingley Village, a suburb in Melbourne's South-East 10 kilometres from his current club in Beaumaris. After impressing at the VIS in the youth league, he was signed to Australian Football powerhouse South Melbourne FC at 16-Years old.

Sarkies made his league debut in round 5 against the Newcastle Breakers as a 16-Year old. Sarkies performance as a youngster for South led to his first international youth call up for Australia.

In his one and only season with South Melbourne, Sarkies made 17 appearances and scored 1 goal. Following the demise of the NSL, Sarkies was allowed to leave South Melbourne and made the jump to the newly formed A-League.

Sarkies played in the A-league Grand Final with Melbourne Victory, he scored his third goal for the club in his team's 6–0 thrashing of Adelaide in the 90th minute and scoring from long range. However it was upon collecting his championship medal that he made headlines around the country by kissing Australian Prime Minister John Howard on his bald head.

=== Adelaide United ===
On 30 March 2007, Sarkies signed a one-year deal with Adelaide United, linking up with his Australian U23 teammates Bruce Djite, Nathan Burns and Robert Cornthwaite. Days after his arrival, captain Ross Aloisi signed with new team Wellington Phoenix, paving the way for Sarkies to become a key player in the Reds midfield brigade. On 28 December after Adelaide's loss to Sydney 3–1 at Adelaide Oval in which Sarkies scored a goal; he complained of a sore arm during the game and was later hospitalized then diagnosed with a deep vein thrombosis (DVT) in his arm at the end of December.

Sarkies signed a new deal with United in May 2008 that kept him at the club until the end of the A-League 2009-10 season. Sarkies set up Sasa Ognenovski from a well taken free kick to score a goal in his 50th A-League game in Adelaide's 2–0 win over Sydney FC Despite an inauspicious start to his Adelaide career Sarkies influence on the team began to show with the injury to fellow playmaker Diego culminating with his first goal of the 2008–09 season which turned out to be the only goal of the round 17 clash against Perth Glory at Members Equity Stadium. He followed it up a week later providing assists for both goals in the 2–0 win over Sydney FC at Adelaide Oval on 3 January 2009.

=== Melbourne Heart ===
After a mixed year with injuries, and not having cemented himself in Adelaide's first XI, he was heavily linked with a move to the new A-League club Melbourne Heart, coming into the competition in the 2010–11 season. The move was confirmed on 24 November 2009 with Sarkies becoming the club's first signing. On 6 April 2012 it was announced that he would be leaving the club.

=== Goulburn Valley Suns ===
After spells in the then Victorian Premier League with Heidelberg United, Port Melbourne Sharks, and Bulleen Lions, Sarkies signed for Shepparton-based Goulburn Valley Suns' inaugural year in the new state top-level league, the National Premier Leagues Victoria, as Bulleen Lions had been placed in the lower NPLV1 Division. Sarkies scored on his debut in a 2–3 home loss against fellow regional side Ballarat Red Devils on 29 March 2014.

== International career ==
Sarkies was called up by coach Guus Hiddink to be part of the "train-on" squad leading up to Australia's appearance at the 2006 FIFA World Cup. He won his first cap in the dying minutes of Australia's 3–1 friendly win against Liechtenstein on 8 June 2006. He was then kept in Germany with the Socceroos after he was given a personal invitation from Guus Hiddink to stay with the team until after the first group match with Japan.

Sarkies has represented his country at all youth levels and was involved in Australia's qualifying campaign for the Beijing 2008 Olympics. The first game of this campaign was against Chinese Taipei at Hindmarsh Stadium on 7 February 2007. Australia won the match 11–0, with Sarkies scoring four goals.

== Career statistics ==
As of 29 December 2008

Appearances and goals by club, season and competition
Club	Season	League (Note: Includes A-League final series.)		Cup		International (Note: Includes FIFA Club World Cup; AFC Champions League statistics are included in season commencing after group stages (i.e. 2008 ACL in 2008–09 A-League season etc.))		Total	
Club	Season	Apps	Goals	Apps	Goals	Apps	Goals	Apps	Goals
Melbourne Victory	2005–06	18	0	4	0	0	0	22	0
Melbourne Victory	2006–07	17	3	5	0	0	0	22	3
Melbourne Victory	Total							44	3
Adelaide United	2007–08	11	1	2	1	0	0	13	2
Adelaide United	2008–09	11	1	0	0	9	0	17	1
Adelaide United	2009–10	3	0	0	0	0	0	3	0
Total								80	6

== Honours ==
Melbourne Victory

- A-League Championship: 2006–07
- A-League Premiership: 2006–07

Adelaide United

- Asian Champions League runner-up: 2008

Australia U20

- OFC U-20 Championship: 2005

Australia U17

- OFC U-17 Championship: 2003
