= Samoa national under-17 football team =

National association football team

Samoa U17
- Association: Football Federation Samoa
- Confederation: OFC (Oceania)
- Head coach: (Samoa) Martin Tamasese
- Captain: Willie Sauiluma
- Most caps: Willie Sauiluma (9)
- Top scorer: Falaniko Nanumea (7)
- Home stadium: National Stadium
- FIFA code: SAM
First colours	Second colours

First international
- Solomon Islands 4 – 0 Western Samoa (New Zealand; April 14, 1997)

Biggest win
- Tonga 0 – 9 Samoa (Nuku'alofa, Tonga; July 20, 2018)

Biggest defeat
- Solomon Islands 12 – 0 Samoa (Pirae, Tahiti; February 18, 2017)

World Cup
- Appearances: 0

OFC Under-17 Championship
- Appearances: 9 (first in 1997)
- Best result: Quarterfinals (2023)

The Samoa national under-17 football team is the national U-17 team of Samoa and is controlled by Football Federation Samoa.

== Competition Record ==
=== FIFA U-17 World Cup record ===
FIFA U-17 World Cup record
Year	Round	Pld	W	D	L	GF	GA	GD	Pts
(China) 1985 to (Ecuador) 1995	Did not participate								
(Egypt) 1997 to (Finland) 2003	Did not qualify								
(Peru) 2005	Withdrew								
(South Korea) 2007 to (Mexico) 2011	Did not participate								
(United Arab Emirates) 2013 to (Qatar) 2025	Did not qualify								
(Qatar) 2026	To be determined								
Total	-	0	0	0	0	0	0	0	0

=== OFC U-17 Championship record ===
The OFC U-17 Championship is a tournament held once every two years to decide the only two qualification spots for the Oceania Football Confederation (OFC) and its representatives at the FIFA U-17 World Cup.

OFC U-17 Championship								Qualification record					
Year	Round	Pld	W	D	L	GF	GA	Pld	W	D	L	GF	GA
(New Zealand) 1983	Did not enter							No qualification					
(Chinese Taipei) 1986	Did not enter							No qualification					
(Australia) 1989	Did not enter							No qualification					
(New Zealand) 1991	Did not enter							No qualification					
(New Zealand) 1993	Did not enter							No qualification					
(Vanuatu) 1995	Did not enter							No qualification					
(New Zealand) 1997	Group stage	3	0	0	3	0	11	No qualification					
(Fiji) 1999	Group stage	4	1	0	3	4	13	No qualification					
(Samoa) (Vanuatu) 2001	Group stage	4	1	0	3	5	17	No qualification					
(American Samoa) (Australia) (New Caledonia) 2003	Group stage	4	1	0	3	3	10	No qualification					
(New Caledonia) 2005	Withdrew							No qualification					
(French Polynesia) 2007	Did not enter							No qualification					
(New Zealand) 2009	Did not enter							No qualification					
(New Zealand) 2011	Did not enter							No qualification					
(Samoa) (Vanuatu) 2013	Did not qualify							3	1	1	1	6	6
(American Samoa) (Samoa) 2015	Group stage	5	1	0	4	7	22						
(Samoa) (French Polynesia) 2017	Group stage	3	0	0	3	0	26	3	2	1	0	6	1
(Tonga) (Solomon Islands) 2018	Group stage	3	0	1	2	4	9	3	3	0	0	22	3
(Fiji) 2023	Quarter-finals	3	1	0	2	6	7	No qualification					
Total	Quarter-finals	38	11	3	24	63	125						

== Current squad ==
The following players have been called up for the squad for the 2023 OFC U-17 Championship from 11 to 28 January 2023.

No.	Pos.	Player	Date of birth (age)	Caps	Goals	Club
1	GK	Kirk Auvele	10 June 2006 (age 20)	0	0	(Football Federation Samoa) Vaivase-Tai
21	GK	Laveaina Sakaio	27 May 2006 (age 20)	0	0	(Football Federation Samoa) Kiwi
22	GK	Talalelei Taituuga	10 February 2007 (age 19)	0	0	(Football Federation Samoa) Strickland Brothers Lepea
2	DF	Aukuso Ah Far	4 May 2007 (age 19)	0	0	(Football Federation Samoa) Strickland Brothers Lepea
3	DF	Setefano Kamilo	4 March 2006 (age 20)	0	0	(Football Federation Samoa) Strickland Brothers Lepea
4	DF	Faapaia Asia	17 April 2006 (age 20)	0	0	(Football Federation Samoa) Salelologa
5	DF	Mitchell Mcilraith	2 April 2006 (age 20)	0	0	(New Zealand Football) Olé Football Academy
15	DF	Pita Tiatia	1 January 2006 (age 20)	0	0	(Football Federation Samoa) Vaivase-Tai
16	DF	Ornan Tamasese	1 January 2006 (age 20)	0	0	(Football Federation Samoa) Kiwi
6	MF	Isaiah Afamasaga	26 March 2008 (age 18)	0	0	(Football Australia) Melbourne Victory
7	MF	Mike Salanoa	18 May 2006 (age 20)	0	0	(Football Federation Samoa) Faatoia United
8	MF	Tomoteo Lesatele	29 December 2006 (age 19)	0	0	(Football Federation Samoa) Vaipuna
9	MF	Rory Tanuvasa	10 January 2006 (age 20)	0	0	(Football Federation Samoa) Vaivase-Tai
11	MF	Kingston Vaitusi	21 December 2007 (age 18)	0	0	(Football Australia) Brisbane City
12	MF	Ariyon Hakai	29 December 2006 (age 19)	0	0	(Football Australia) Lalor United
14	MF	Jason Goble-Lote	20 May 2008 (age 18)	0	0	(Football Australia) Gold Coast Knights
18	MF	Cayden Steffener	3 November 2007 (age 18)	0	0	(New Zealand Football) Auckland City
20	MF	Malakye Paterson	13 January 2007 (age 19)	0	0	(New Zealand Football) Olé Football Academy
10	FW	Ethelbert Edward	3 September 2007 (age 19)	0	0	(Football Federation Samoa) Strickland Brothers Lepea
13	FW	Lomitusi Scanlan	11 February 2008 (age 18)	0	0	(Football Federation Samoa) Moata'a
17	FW	Alex Malauulu	12 March 2006 (age 20)	0	0	(Football Australia) Canberra Croatia
19	FW	Pharrell Trainor	20 June 2006 (age 20)	0	0	(Football Australia) Newcastle United Jets

== 2018 squad ==
The following players have been called up for the squad for the 2018 OFC U-16 Championship from 9 to 22 September 2018.

No.	Pos.	Player	Date of birth (age)	Caps	Goals	Club
1	GK	Semu Faimata	10 August 2003 (age 23)	5	0	(Football Federation Samoa) Kiwi
21	GK	Steve Vainalepa	4 November 2002 (age 23)	1	0	(Football Federation Samoa) Faleasiu
2	DF	Eli Satuala	6 November 2002 (age 23)	5	0	(Football Federation Samoa) BSL Vaitele Uta
3	DF	Posiano Fuatogi	18 August 2002 (age 24)	0	0	(New Zealand Football) Ellerslie AFC
4	DF	Tavita To'o	19 July 2002 (age 24)	6	0	(Football Federation Samoa) Kiwi
5	DF	Fetuao Belcher	1 May 2003 (age 23)	6	3	(New Zealand Football) Havelock North Wanderers
12	DF	Tony Amituanai	29 December 2002 (age 23)	5	0	(Football Federation Samoa) Moaula United
15	DF	Alex Falelua	2 January 2002 (age 24)	5	0	(Football Federation Samoa) Faleasiu
18	DF	Michael Leatutu	4 December 2002 (age 23)	3	0	(Football Australia) Minto Stingers
	MF	Samu Galu Tauasa	May 7, 2002 (age 24)	3	0	(Football Federation Samoa) Moaula United
6	MF	Kawasaki Saofaiga	March 4, 2002 (age 24)	6	3	(Football Federation Samoa) Lepea
8	MF	Bitner Tafili	5 November 2003 (age 22)	2	0	(Football Federation Samoa) Lupe o le Soaga
9	MF	Falaniko Nanumea	January 17, 2002 (age 24)	10	7	(Football Federation Samoa) Kiwi
10	MF	John Tumua	15 January 2003 (age 23)	6	2	(Football Federation Samoa) Vaipuna
13	MF	Jensen Fa'afua	24 July 2002 (age 24)	1	0	(New Zealand Football) Ellerslie AFC
14	MF	Isaako Sione	26 February 2002 (age 24)	5	0	(Football Federation Samoa) Lupe o le Soaga
19	MF	Stanley Leavai	April 18, 2003 (age 23)	1	0	(Football Federation Samoa) Fa'atoia United
7	FW	Lotial Mano	January 15, 2002 (age 24)	11	5	(Football Federation Samoa) Kiwi
11	FW	Jarvis Filimalae	April 20, 2003 (age 23)	6	7	(Football Federation Samoa) Kiwi
16	FW	Denny Cheshire	27 March 2002 (age 24)	2	0	(Football Federation Samoa) Moamoa Rovers
17	FW	Alman Kwan	18 January 2003 (age 23)	1	0	(Football Federation Samoa) Vaivase-Tai

== List Of Coaches ==
- (Samoa) Malo Vaga (2013)
- (Samoa) Desmond Fa'aiuaso (2015–2017)
- (Samoa) Martin Tamasese (2018–)
