= Mildred Sopé =

Vanuatu poet (1950–2022)

- Born: 1950; Ambae
- Died: 2022 (aged 71–72)
- Occupation: Poet
- Spouse(s): Barak Sopé

Mildred M. Leimatawia Sopé (1950–2022) was a Ni-Vanuatu poet and educator. She was the wife of Barak Sopé, fifth Prime Minister of Vanuatu.

Mildred Sopé was born on 1950 in Ambae Island, a Vanuatu island now evacuated due to volcanic activity. She was educated at the Torgil Missionary School and the British Secondary School (now Malapoa College) in Port Vila. After studying in Fiji from 1972 to 1974, she returned to become the first Ni-Vanuatu teacher at the British Secondary School. One of the earliest Ni-Vanuatu poets to be published, eight of her poems were included in Albert Wendt's Some Modern Poems from the New Hebrides (1975), including her widely anthologized “Chusum/Choice", a poem with Bislama and English versions. She and her husband were active in the Vanuatu independence movement; the Republic of Vanuatu was founded in 1980.

Two of her poems were included in the French anthology Poemes du Pacifique au Feminin (1983). Her only poetry collection was The Questioning Mind (1987).
