= Bitner Tafili =

Samoan footballer

Junior Bitner Tafili
Personal information
- Date of birth: 5 November 2003 (age 22)

Team information
- Current team: Lupe o le Soaga

Senior career*
Years	Team	Apps	(Gls)
2018–	Lupe o le Soaga		

International career
2018	Samoa U17	2	(0)
- * Club domestic league appearances and goals

Junior Bitner Tafili (born 5 November 2003) is a Samoan football and rugby player, who plays for Lupe o le Soaga and has represented Samoa internationally in the Samoa national under-17 football team and Samoa national under-20 rugby union team.

Tafili is from Magiagi. He played as a midfielder for Lupe o le Soaga in the 2020 OFC Champions League. In July 2018 he was selected for the Samoa national under-17 football team for the 2018 OFC U-16 Championship.

He won the golden glove in the Samoan national football league in both 2020, and 2021.

== Rugby career ==
In 2021 he was selected for the Samoa under-18 national rugby team. In October 2022 he was selected for the Samoa national under-20 rugby union team for the 2022 Oceania Rugby Under 20 Championship.
