= New Caledonia national under-17 football team =

New Caledonia
- Nickname(s): Les Cagous (The Kagus); Les Petits Cagous (The Little Kagus)
- Association: New Caledonian Football Federation
- Confederation: OFC (Oceania)
- Head coach: Dominique Wacalie
- Captain: Nolhann Alebate
- Most caps: Jekob Jeno, Bernard Iwa and Cyril Nyipie (8)
- Top scorer: Renaldo Nonmeu (8)
- FIFA code: NCL
First colours	Second colours

First international
- New Caledonia 4–3 Fiji (Auckland, New Zealand; 3 December 1983)

Biggest win
- New Caledonia 17–0 Tonga (Auckland, New Zealand; 17 January 2011)

Biggest defeat
- New Caledonia 0–16 Morocco (Doha, Qatar; 09 November 2025)

FIFA U-17 World Cup
- Appearances: 3 (first in 2017)
- Best result: Group stage (2017, 2023, 2025)

OFC U-16 Men's Championship
- Appearances: 12 (first in 1983)
- Best result: Runners-up (2003, 2013, 2017, 2023)

The New Caledonia national under-17 football team is the national U-17 team of New Caledonia and is controlled by the New Caledonian Football Federation.

== Competition record ==
=== FIFA U-17 World Cup ===
Year	Result	Pld	W	D	L	GF	GA
(China) 1985	Did not qualify						
(Canada) 1987	Did not participate						
(Scotland) 1989	Did not participate						
(Italy) 1991	Did not participate						
(Japan) 1993	Did not participate						
(Ecuador) 1995	Did not participate						
(Egypt) 1997	Did not participate						
(New Zealand) 1999	Did not qualify						
(Trinidad and Tobago) 2001	Withdrew						
(Finland) 2003	Did not qualify						
(Peru) 2005	Did not qualify						
(South Korea) 2007	Did not qualify						
(Nigeria) 2009	Did not qualify						
(Mexico) 2011	Did not qualify						
(United Arab Emirates) 2013	Did not qualify						
(Chile) 2015	Did not qualify						
(India) 2017	Group stage	3	0	1	2	2	13
(Brazil) 2019	Did not qualify						
(Indonesia) 2023	Group stage	3	0	0	3	0	24
(Qatar) 2025	Group stage	3	0	1	2	1	22
(Qatar) 2026	In progress	1	0	0	1	0	1
(Qatar) 2027	To be determined						
(Qatar) 2028	To be determined						
(Qatar) 2029	To be determined						
Total:4/24	Group stage	10	0	2	8	3	60

=== OFC U-16 Men's Championship ===
Year	Round	Pld	W	D	L	GF	GA
(New Zealand) 1983	Fourth place	5	2	0	3	6	12
(Chinese Taipei) 1986	Did not enter						
(Australia) 1989	Did not enter						
(New Zealand) 1991	Did not enter						
(New Zealand) 1993	Did not enter						
(Vanuatu) 1995	Did not enter						
(New Zealand) 1997	Did not enter						
(Fiji) 1999	Fourth place	6	2	1	3	7	15
(Samoa) (Vanuatu) 2001	Withdrew						
(American Samoa) (Australia) (New Caledonia) 2003	Runners-up	6	4	0	2	12	7
(New Caledonia) 2005	Fourth place	6	3	0	3	13	13
(French Polynesia) 2007	Fourth place	3	0	2	1	1	5
(New Zealand) 2009	Third place	3	1	0	2	3	7
(New Zealand) 2011	Group stage	4	2	0	2	27	6
(Samoa) (Vanuatu) 2013	Runners-up	5	3	0	2	10	7
(American Samoa) (Samoa) 2015	Fourth place	7	4	0	3	24	17
(Samoa) (French Polynesia) 2017	Runners-up	5	2	1	2	10	14
(Tonga) (Solomon Islands) 2018	Group stage	3	0	1	2	2	4
(Fiji) 2023	Runners-up	5	2	1	2	14	5
(French Polynesia) 2024	Third place						
(Solomon Islands) 2025	Runners-up						
(Papua New Guinea) 2026	Group stage						
Total:15/22	Runners-up	58	25	6	27	129	112

== Results and fixtures ==
The following matches were played or are scheduled to be played by the national team in the current or upcoming seasons.

== Notable results ==
Notable results
Team	Date	Result	Goalscorers
Singapore	2 October 2017	2–1	Richard 21', 29'
Japan	14 October 2017	1–1	Jeno 83'

== List of coaches ==
- (New Caledonia) Francis Tartas (2010–2011)
- (New Caledonia) Herve Gnipate (2010–2011)
- (New Caledonia) Kamali Fitealeata (2012–2015)
- (New Caledonia) Michael Clarque (2015–2017)
- (New Caledonia) Dominique Wacalie (2017–2023)
- (France) Léonardo Lopez (2023–)

== Head-to-head record ==
The following table shows New Caledonia's head-to-head record in the FIFA U-17 World Cup.

Opponent	Pld	W	D	L	GF	GA	GD	Win %
Brazil	1	0	0	1	0	9	−9	0.00
Ecuador	1	0	0	1	0	1	−1	0.00
England	1	0	0	1	0	10	−10	0.00
France	1	0	0	1	1	7	−6	0.00
Honduras	1	0	0	1	0	5	−5	0.00
Iran	1	0	0	1	0	5	−5	0.00
Japan	2	0	2	0	1	1	+0	0.00
Morocco	1	0	0	1	0	16	−16	0.00
Portugal	1	0	0	1	1	6	−5	0.00
South Korea	0	0	0	0	0	0	+0	—
Uganda	0	0	0	0	0	0	+0	—
Total	10	0	2	8	3	60	−57	0.00

== See also ==
- New Caledonia national football team
- New Caledonia national under-20 football team
- New Caledonia women's national football team
- New Caledonia national futsal team
