= Ratu Dau =

Fijian footballer

Personal information
- Full name: Ratu Kaliova Rokomaya Dau
- Date of birth: 6 May 2000 (age 26)
- Place of birth: Fiji
- Position: Forward

Team information
- Current team: Ba
- Number: 7

Youth career
- –2016: Tavua

Senior career*
Years	Team	Apps	(Gls)
2016–2019	Tavua		
2019–	Ba		

International career
2017	Fiji U17	2	(3)
2018	Fiji U20	3	(2)
2018–	Fiji	1	(0)
- * Club domestic league appearances and goals

Ratu Dau (born 6 May 2000) is a Fijian footballer who plays as a forward for Fijian club Ba and the Fiji national team.

== Club career ==
Dau started his career in the youth of Tavua. In 2016 he made his debut for the first team.

== National team ==
In 2018 Dau was called up by coach Christophe Gamel for the Fiji national football team. He made his debut on July 5, 2018, in a 1–0 loss against Malaysia. He came in for Rusiate Matarerega in the 66th minute of play.
