= Luke Supyk =

New Zealand footballer (born 2006)

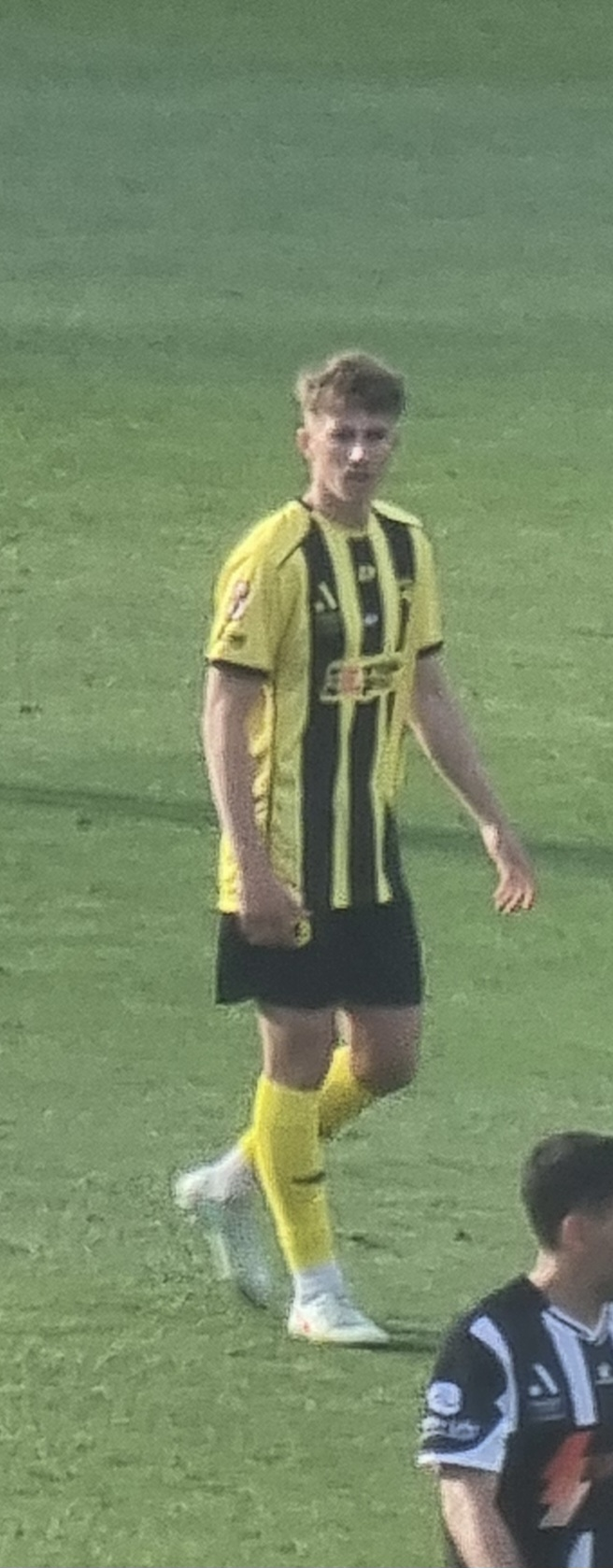
- Supyk playing for the Wellington Phoenix in 2025.

Personal information
- Full name: Luke Stuart Supyk
- Date of birth: 4 March 2006 (age 20)
- Place of birth: Wellington, New Zealand
- Position: Left winger

Team information
- Current team: Gateshead

Youth career
- Waimakariri United
- Nomads United
- 2021–2023: Wellington Phoenix

Senior career*
| Years | Team | Apps | (Gls) |
| 2023–2026 | Wellington Phoenix Reserves | 26 | (12) |
| 2023–2026 | Wellington Phoenix | 9 | (0) |
| 2026– | Gateshead | 4 | (0) |

International career^{‡}
| 2023– | New Zealand U17 | 5 | (6) |
- * Club domestic league appearances and goals as of 2 September 2026 ‡ National team caps and goals as of 17:14, 2 November 2023 (UTC)

Luke Stuart Supyk (Ukrainian: [ˈsupɪk]; born 4 March 2006) is a New Zealand footballer who plays as a forward for National League side Gateshead.

== Club career ==
Born in Wellington, Supyk began his career in the academies of Waimakariri United and Nomads United before joining Wellington Phoenix in 2021. Having progressed through the academy, he was added to the club's reserve side, playing in the Central League, where he impressed with his goal-scoring powers.

On the 27 August 2023, Supyk made his professional debut for the first team in the Australia Cup round-of-32 match against Melbourne City where they lost 3–0. Supyk came on as a late substitute for Kosta Barbarouses. On his return from a training camp with the New Zealand under-17 squad in Japan, Supyk was officially announced as the first-team's nineteenth signing.

On 29 May 2026, the Wellington Phoenix confirmed Supyk's contract had not been renewed for the 2026–27 season and that he would be departing the club as a result.

== International career ==
Supyk was called up to the New Zealand under-17 squad for the 2023 OFC U-17 Championship, where he finished joint-top scorer alongside Tahitian Titouan Guillemant, helping New Zealand to the title. The competition served as qualification for the 2023 FIFA U-17 World Cup, and Supyk was again called up to represent the nation in the tournament.

Supyk was named as part of the 21-player New Zealand U-20 squad for the 2025 FIFA U-20 World Cup that took place in Chile from September to October 2025. Supyk made two appearances in the tournament, with New Zealand exiting after the conclusion of the group stage.

== Personal life ==
Supyk's older brother is Adam Supyk, who is also a professional footballer and currently plays for Wellington Olympic.

== Career statistics ==
=== Club ===
As of 2 November 2023.

Appearances and goals by club, season and competition
| Club | Season | League | | | Cup | | Other | | Total | |
| Club | Season | Division | Apps | Goals | Apps | Goals | Apps | Goals | Apps | Goals |
|---|---|---|---|---|---|---|---|---|---|---|
| Wellington Phoenix Reserves | 2023 | National League | 12 | 6 | 0 | 0 | 0 | 0 | 12 | 6 |
| Wellington Phoenix Reserves | Total | | 12 | 6 | 0 | 0 | 0 | 0 | 12 | 6 |
| Wellington Phoenix | 2023–24 | A-League Men | 0 | 0 | 1 (Note: Appearances in the Australia Cup) | 0 | 0 | 0 | 1 | 0 |
| Career total | | | 12 | 6 | 1 | 0 | 0 | 0 | 13 | 6 |

== Honours ==
New Zealand

- OFC U-19 Championship: 2024
