= Papua New Guinea national under-17 soccer team =

Papua New Guinea U17
- Nickname(s): Kapuls (Tok Pisin for Cuscus)
- Association: Papua New Guinea Football Association
- Confederation: OFC (Oceania)
- Head coach: (Papua New Guinea) Samson Steven
- Captain: Gregory Togubai
- Most caps: John Ray (7)
- Top scorer: Barthy Kerobin (4)
- Home stadium: Sir Hubert Murray Stadium
- FIFA code: PNG
First colours	Second colours

First international
- Australia 3 - 0 Papua New Guinea (Kaohsiung, Taiwan; December 7, 1986)

Biggest win
- American Samoa 0–7 Papua New Guinea (Nuku'alofa, Tonga; 6 May 2025)

Biggest defeat
- Solomon Islands 14–0 Papua New Guinea (Nuku'alofa, Tonga; 12 April 2024)

World Cup
- Appearances: 0

OFC Under-17 Championship
- Appearances: 9 (first in 1986)
- Best result: 4th (1986)

The Papua New Guinea national under-17 soccer team is the national U-17 team of Papua New Guinea and is controlled by the Papua New Guinea Football Association.

== Competition Record ==
=== FIFA U-17 World Cup record ===
FIFA U-17 World Cup record
Year	Round	Pld	W	D	L	GF	GA	GD	Pts
(China) 1985	Did not participate								
(Canada) 1987	Did not qualify								
(Scotland) 1989 to (Egypt) 1997	Did not participate								
(New Zealand) 1999 to (Trinidad and Tobago) 2001	Did not qualify								
(Finland) 2003	Withdrew								
(Peru) 2005	Did not qualify								
(South Korea) 2007 to (Nigeria) 2009	Did not participate								
(Mexico) 2011 to (Brazil) 2019	Did not qualify								
(Indonesia) 2023	Withdrew								
(Qatar) 2025	Did not qualify								
(Qatar) 2026	Did not qualify								
Total	-	0	0	0	0	0	0	0	0

=== OFC U-17 Championship record ===
The OFC U-17 Championship is a tournament held once every two years to decide the only two qualification spots for the Oceania Football Confederation (OFC) and its representatives at the FIFA U-17 World Cup.

OFC U-16 Men's Championship record								Qualification record					
Year	Round	Pld	W	D	L	GF	GA	Pld	W	D	L	GF	GA
(New Zealand) 1983	Did not enter							No qualification					
(Chinese Taipei) 1986	Fourth place	4	0	2	2	1	5	No qualification					
(Australia) 1989	Did not enter							No qualification					
(New Zealand) 1991	Did not enter							No qualification					
(New Zealand) 1993	Did not enter							No qualification					
(Vanuatu) 1995	Did not enter							No qualification					
(New Zealand) 1997	Did not enter							No qualification					
(Fiji) 1999	Group stage	5	2	0	3	10	26	No qualification					
(Samoa) (Vanuatu) 2001	Group stage	4	3	0	1	11	9	No qualification					
(American Samoa) (Australia) (New Caledonia) 2003	Withdrew							No qualification					
(New Caledonia) 2005	Group stage	4	1	1	2	10	11	No qualification					
(French Polynesia) 2007	Did not enter							No qualification					
(New Zealand) 2009	Did not enter							No qualification					
(New Zealand) 2011	Group stage	4	2	0	2	4	7	No qualification					
(Samoa) (Vanuatu) 2013	Fifth place	5	1	1	3	2	8	Qualified automatically					
(American Samoa) (Samoa) 2015	Group stage	5	2	1	2	9	5	No qualification					
(Samoa) (French Polynesia) 2017	Semi-finals	4	1	1	2	8	9	Qualified automatically					
(Tonga) (Solomon Islands) 2018	Group stage	3	1	0	2	8	9	Qualified automatically					
(Fiji) 2023	Withdrew							No qualification					
(Tonga) (French Polynesia) 2024	Did not qualify							3	1	0	2	3	22
(Tonga) (Solomon Islands) 2025	Qualifield							3	2	1	0	12	2
Total	Semi-finals	38	13	6	19	63	89	6	3	1	2	15	24

== Current technical staff ==
Position	
Head coach	(Papua New Guinea) Samson Steven
Assistant coach	(Papua New Guinea) Mathew Witu
Team manager	(Papua New Guinea) Tinge Emuka

== Current squad ==
The following players were called up for the 2018 OFC U-16 Championship from 9 to 22 September 2018.

Caps and goals as of 15 September 2018 after the game against New Zealand.

No.	Pos.	Player	Date of birth (age)	Caps	Goals	Club
1	GK	Andrew Baniau	2 August 2002 (age 23)	3	0	(Papua New Guinea Football Association) Madang
20	GK	Jesse Mandari	8 October 2002 (age 23)	0	0	(Papua New Guinea Football Association) Tusbab Stallons
2	DF	Butler Hosea	2 June 2002 (age 24)	3	0	(Papua New Guinea Football Association) Madang
3	DF	Russell Patrom	11 September 2002 (age 23)	1	0	(Papua New Guinea Football Association) PNG FA
4	DF	Elijah Potua	1 July 2002 (age 24)	3	0	(Papua New Guinea Football Association) PNG FA
5	DF	Karlo Kelly	22 September 2002 (age 23)	3	0	(Papua New Guinea Football Association) PNG FA
15	DF	Townsville Lakamanga	16 July 2002 (age 24)	1	0	(Papua New Guinea Football Association) PNG FA
17	DF	Ben Boniepe	29 September 2002 (age 23)	3	0	(Papua New Guinea Football Association) PNG FA
6	MF	Akaya Wadunah	25 January 2005 (age 21)	3	1	(Papua New Guinea Football Association) Tusbab Stallions
7	MF	Morientes Sow	4 April 2002 (age 24)	0	0	(Papua New Guinea Football Association) PNG FA
8	MF	Joel Alex	7 August 2002 (age 23)	3	0	(Papua New Guinea Football Association) Madang
10	MF	Lee-Navu Faunt	4 May 2003 (age 23)	2	0	(Papua New Guinea Football Association) PNG FA
11	MF	Morris Devi	29 September 2002 (age 23)	3	1	(Papua New Guinea Football Association) Tusbab Stallions
12	MF	Joseph Ealedona Jr.	14 August 2003 (age 22)	1	0	(Papua New Guinea Football Association) PNG FA
16	MF	Emmanuel Bafeng	25 July 2002 (age 23)	0	0	(Papua New Guinea Football Association) PNG FA
18	MF	Bruce Tiampo	5 July 2002 (age 24)	3	0	(Papua New Guinea Football Association) PNG FA
19	MF	Ishmael Yopiyopi	8 April 2002 (age 24)	2	0	(Papua New Guinea Football Association) Madang
9	FW	Renagi Ila	19 August 2002 (age 23)	3	1	(Papua New Guinea Football Association) PNG FA
13	FW	Josiah Daimoi	23 July 2003 (age 23)	1	0	(Papua New Guinea Football Association) PNG FA
14	FW	Siegfried Beschel	4 April 2002 (age 24)	3	5	(Football Australia) Wynnum Wolves

== 2017 Squad ==
The following players were called up for the 2017 OFC U-17 Championship from 11 to 24 February 2017.

Caps and goals as of 22 February 2017 after the game against New Zealand.

No.	Pos.	Player	Date of birth (age)	Caps	Goals	Club
1	GK	Charley Ningikau	4 March 2000 (age 26)	0	0	(Papua New Guinea Football Association) Centre of Excellence Madang
20	GK	Graham Berigami	1 February 2000 (age 26)	4	0	(Papua New Guinea Football Association) Tusbab Stallions
2	DF	Milton Biwa	28 October 2000 (age 25)	0	0	(Papua New Guinea Football Association) Potsie
3	DF	Kimson Kapai	18 August 2000 (age 25)	4	1	(Papua New Guinea Football Association) Centre of Excellence Madang
4	DF	Sylvester Luke	12 December 2000 (age 25)	4	0	(Papua New Guinea Football Association) Centre of Excellence Lae
5	MF	Freeman Giwi	7 July 2000 (age 26)	4	0	(Papua New Guinea Football Association) Tusbab Stallions
13	DF	Thomas Kongragle	24 March 2000 (age 26)	1	0	(Papua New Guinea Football Association) Bugandi
17	DF	Dopson Noi	7 November 2000 (age 25)	4	0	(Papua New Guinea Football Association) 8 Mile Pukpuk
6	MF	Samuel Detnom	8 March 2001 (age 25)	0	0	(Papua New Guinea Football Association) Centre of Excellence Lae
7	MF	Emmanuel Simongi	25 September 2000 (age 25)	4	1	(Papua New Guinea Football Association) Besta United PNG
10	MF	Oberth Simon	1 January 2001 (age 25)	4	0	(Papua New Guinea Football Association) Centre of Excellence Lae
11	MF	Yagi Yasasa	17 August 2000 (age 25)	4	0	(Papua New Guinea Football Association) Gigira Laitepo Morobe
12	MF	Ricky Wadunah	20 December 2000 (age 25)	3	0	(Papua New Guinea Football Association) Tusbab Stallions
14	MF	Emmanuel Yopiyopi	18 August 2000 (age 25)	3	0	(Papua New Guinea Football Association) Bugandi
16	MF	Jonathan Allen	3 January 2000 (age 26)	4	1	(Papua New Guinea Football Association) Besta United PNG
18	MF	Wolfram Gregory	25 March 2000 (age 26)	1	0	(Papua New Guinea Football Association) Bugandi
19	MF	Abraham Allen	25 December 2000 (age 25)	1	0	(Papua New Guinea Football Association) Centre of Excellence Madang
8	FW	Aben Pukue	25 September 2000 (age 25)	4	1	(Papua New Guinea Football Association) Centre of Excellence Madang
9	FW	Barthy Kerobin	13 September 2000 (age 25)	4	4	(Papua New Guinea Football Association) Besta United PNG
15	FW	Dunstan Jefferey	14 July 2000 (age 26)	0	0	(Papua New Guinea Football Association) Centre of Excellence Lae

== Fixtures & Results ==
=== 2018 ===
9 September 2018 2018 OFC U-16 Championship Group Stage	Papua New Guinea	0–5	Solomon Islands	Honiara, Solomon Islands
15:00		Report	Le'ai 12', 30' (pen.), 41', 90+2'; Satu 70'	Stadium: Lawson Tama Stadium; Attendance: 3.500; Referee: Salesh Chand (Fiji)

12 September 2018 2018 OFC U-16 Championship Group Stage	Papua New Guinea	5–0	Vanuatu	Honiara, Solomon Islands
10:00	Beschel 7', 79'; Ila 19'; Devi 56'; Wadunah 70'	Report		Stadium: Lawson Tama Stadium; Attendance: 200; Referee: Sione Mau (American Samoa)

15 September 2018 2018 OFC U-16 Championship Group Stage	New Zealand	4–3	Papua New Guinea	Honiara, Solomon Islands
10:00	Hamilton 47', 55'; Wilson 48'; Old 83'	Report	Beschel 37', 75', 90'	Stadium: Lawson Tama Stadium; Attendance: 2.000; Referee: Salesh Chand (Fiji)
