= Willie Sauiluma =

Samoan footballer

Personal information
- Date of birth: 12 July 2000 (age 26)
- Place of birth: Samoa
- Position: Forward

Team information
- Current team: Goulburn Valley Suns

Youth career
- Shepparton Junior Soccer Association
- –2017: Goulburn Valley Suns

Senior career*
Years	Team	Apps	(Gls)
2017–2018	Shepparton South	46	(17)
2019–2022	Goulburn Valley Suns	26	(0)
2022–	Pascoe Vale	7	(1)

International career^{‡}
2015–2017	Samoa U17	10	(2)
2019	Samoa U23	3	(0)
2019–	Samoa	4	(0)
- * Club domestic league appearances and goals as of 18 November 2022 ‡ National team caps and goals as of 18 July 2019

Willie Sauiluma (born 12 July 2000), is a Samoan international footballer who plays as a forward for the Samoa national football team and Goulburn Valley Suns.

== Early life ==
Sauiluma was born in Samoa but grew up in Australia. in Australia he played for Shepparton South and the Goulburn Valley Suns.

== Career ==
In June 2016 he was selected for the Samoa national under-17 football team for the 2017 OFC U-17 Championship. He captained the squad, and was subsequently selected to attend the second round in Tahiti. In June 2019 he was named to the squad for the 2019 Pacific Games. He also appeared for the Samoa U23s at the 2019 OFC Men's Olympic Qualifying Tournament.

=== Career statistics ===
==== Club ====
As of 3 March 2020.

Club	Season	League			Cup		Other		Total	
Club	Season	Division	Apps	Goals	Apps	Goals	Apps	Goals	Apps	Goals
Shepparton South	2017	Bendigo Amateur Soccer League	26	12	–		–		26	12
Shepparton South	2018	Bendigo Amateur Soccer League	22	5	–		–		22	5
Shepparton South	Total		46	17	0	0	0	0	46	17
Goulburn Valley Suns	2019	NPL 2	0	0	1 (Note: Appearances in the FFA Cup)	0	–		1	0
Career total			0	0	0	0	3	0	0	0

==== International ====
As of 3 March 2020

National team	Year	Apps	Goals
Samoa	2019	3	0
Total		3	0
