= Chris Williams (football manager) =

Australian former soccer manager (born 1986)

Personal information
- Date of birth: 1986 (age 39–40)
- Place of birth: Sydney, Australia

Managerial career
- Years: Team
- 2010–11: Tonga U-17
- 2011: Tonga

Chris Williams is an Australian former soccer (football) manager.

He was appointed by the Tonga Football Federation in November 2010.

Williams was appointed as U17 coach for the nation and his team lost all four of their games, conceded 46 goals in the process at the 2011 OFC U-17 Championship which included a 17-0 loss to New Caledonia. Prior to the competition Williams had written that the Tonga Football Federation had forgotten to withdraw from the competition and rather than be fined $NZ 50,000 by the OFC, they allowed Williams to take a team to the tournament.

He was also put in of the Tonga national football team during their 2014 FIFA World Cup qualification campaign in 2011. In November 2011, his Tonga team became the first team in international football to lose to American Samoa, Tonga finished second in a group of four with four points.
