= Cook Islands national under-17 football team =

National association youth football team

Cook Islands U17
- Nickname: The Cooks
- Association: Cook Islands; Football Association
- Confederation: OFC (Oceania)
- Head coach: (Cook Islands) Tahiri Elikana
- Most caps: Sunai Joseph (11)
- Top scorer: Conroy Tiputoa (3)
- FIFA code: COK
| First colours | Second colours |

First international
- Australia 14–0 Cook Islands (New Zealand; 15 April 1997)

Biggest win
- Tonga 1–7 Cook Islands (Apia, Samoa; 22 January 2013)

Biggest defeat
- Australia 14–0 Cook Islands (New Zealand; 15 April 1997)

World Cup
- Appearances: 0

OFC Under-17 Championship
- Appearances: 10 (first in 1997)
- Best result: 6th place (2013), Quarterfinals (2023)

The Cook Islands national under-17 football team is the national U-17 team of the Cook Islands and is controlled by the Cook Islands Football Association. With a population of around 24,000 people, it remains one of the smallest FIFA teams.

== Competition Record ==
=== FIFA U-17 World Cup record ===
FIFA U-17 World Cup record
| Year | Round | Pld | W | D | L | GF | GA | GD | Pts |
|---|---|---|---|---|---|---|---|---|---|
| (Egypt) 1997 to (New Zealand) 1999 | Did not qualify | | | | | | | | |
| (Trinidad and Tobago) 2001 | Withdrew | | | | | | | | |
| (Finland) 2003 to (Peru) 2005 | Did not qualify | | | | | | | | |
| (South Korea) 2007 to (Nigeria) 2009 | Did not participate | | | | | | | | |
| (Mexico) 2011 to (Qatar) 2027 | Did not qualify | | | | | | | | |
| (Qatar) 2028 | To be determined | | | | | | | | |
| Total | - | 0 | 0 | 0 | 0 | 0 | 0 | 0 | 0 |

=== OFC U-17 Championship record ===
The OFC Under 17 Championship is a tournament held once every two years to decide the only two qualification spots for the Oceania Football Confederation (OFC) and its representatives at the FIFA U-17 World Cup.

OFC U-17 Championship
| Year | Round | Pld | W | D | L | GF | GA | GD | Pts |
|---|---|---|---|---|---|---|---|---|---|
| (New Zealand) 1997 | Group Stage | 3 | 0 | 0 | 3 | 0 | 26 | −26 | 0 |
| (Fiji) 1999 | Group Stage | 5 | 0 | 1 | 4 | 2 | 31 | −29 | 0 |
| (Samoa) & (Vanuatu) 2001 | Withdrew | - | - | - | - | - | - | - | - |
| (American Samoa) & (Australia) & (New Caledonia) 2003 | Group Stage | 4 | 1 | 1 | 2 | 2 | 8 | −6 | 4 |
| (New Caledonia) 2005 | Group Stage | 4 | 0 | 0 | 4 | 0 | 19 | −19 | 0 |
| (French Polynesia) 2007 | Did not participate | - | - | - | - | - | - | - | - |
| (New Zealand) 2009 | Did not participate | - | - | - | - | - | - | - | - |
| (New Zealand) 2011 | Group Stage | 4 | 1 | 0 | 3 | 8 | 15 | −7 | 3 |
| (Samoa) & (Vanuatu) 2013 | 6th place | 8 | 2 | 0 | 6 | 10 | 28 | −18 | 6 |
| (American Samoa) & (Samoa) 2015 | Group Stage | 5 | 0 | 0 | 5 | 2 | 27 | −25 | 0 |
| (Samoa) & (French Polynesia) 2017 | Preliminary Round | 3 | 2 | 0 | 1 | 6 | 5 | +1 | 6 |
| (Tonga) & (Solomon Islands) 2018 | Preliminary Round | 3 | 0 | 1 | 2 | 1 | 6 | −5 | 1 |
| (Fiji) 2023 | Quarterfinals | 3 | 0 | 0 | 3 | 1 | 11 | −10 | 0 |
| Total | 6th place & Quarterfinals | 42 | 6 | 3 | 33 | 32 | 176 | -144 | 20 |

== Current Technical Staff ==
| Position | |
|---|---|
| Head coach | (Cook Islands) Delaney Yaqona |
| Assistant coach | (Cook Islands) Donald Munro |
| Team manager | (Cook Islands) Junior Areai |
| Physio | (Cook Islands) Pare Tangata |

== Current squad ==
The following players have been called up for the squad for the 2023 OFC U-17 Championship from 11 to 28 January 2023.

| No. | Pos. | Player | Date of birth (age) | Caps | Goals | Club |
|---|---|---|---|---|---|---|
| 1 | GK | Robert Savage | January 11, 2006 (age 20) | 1 | 0 | (Cook Islands Football Association) Avatiu |
| 20 | GK | Teina Ngametua | March 13, 2007 (age 19) | 3 | 0 | (Cook Islands Football Association) Tupapa Maraerenga |
| 2 | DF | Ioane Brogan | July 15, 2008 (age 18) | 1 | 0 | (Cook Islands Football Association) Matavera-Ngatangiia |
| 12 | DF | Stanley Tutai | April 13, 2007 (age 19) | 3 | 0 | (Cook Islands Football Association) Avatiu |
| 13 | DF | Temuera Newnham | March 24, 2008 (age 18) | 3 | 0 | (Cook Islands Football Association) Matavera-Ngatangiia |
| 16 | DF | Iaveta Remuera | July 1, 2006 (age 20) | 1 | 0 | (Cook Islands Football Association) Nikao Sokattak |
| 18 | DF | Jordan Matapo | July 12, 2006 (age 20) | 3 | 0 | (Cook Islands Football Association) Nikao Sokattak |
| 19 | DF | Dwayne Matapo | July 12, 2006 (age 20) | 3 | 0 | (Cook Islands Football Association) Nikao Sokattak |
| 3 | MF | Paulo Allsworth | October 7, 2006 (age 20) | 2 | 0 | (Cook Islands Football Association) Nikao Sokattak |
| 6 | MF | Shane Tuteru | June 29, 2006 (age 20) | 3 | 0 | (Cook Islands Football Association) Tupapa Maraerenga |
| 8 | MF | Dallas Rongokea | July 13, 2007 (age 19) | 3 | 0 | (Cook Islands Football Association) Nikao Sokattak |
| 9 | MF | Te Ariki Ringi | June 18, 2006 (age 20) | 0 | 0 | (Cook Islands Football Association) Matavera-Ngatangiia |
| 10 | MF | Jeremiah Williams | November 11, 2006 (age 19) | 3 | 1 | (New Zealand Football) Auckland United |
| 15 | MF | Hyrum Numanga | November 7, 2007 (age 18) | 0 | 0 | (Cook Islands Football Association) Matavera-Ngatangiia |
| 4 | FW | Timi Kiriau | August 10, 2008 (age 18) | 2 | 0 | (Cook Islands Football Association) Avatiu |
| 5 | FW | Tione Nand | January 1, 2006 (age 20) | 3 | 0 | (Cook Islands Football Association) Avatiu |
| 7 | FW | Christopher Pita | January 16, 2006 (age 20) | 3 | 0 | (Cook Islands Football Association) Avatiu |
| 11 | FW | Juleo Tauu | September 3, 2006 (age 20) | 2 | 0 | (Cook Islands Football Association) Tupapa Maraerenga |
| 14 | FW | Akai Tuakeu | April 8, 2006 (age 20) | 1 | 0 | (Cook Islands Football Association) Aitutaki |
