= Tonga national under-17 football team =

National association football team

Tonga U17
- Association: Tonga Football Association
- Confederation: OFC (Oceania)
- Head coach: (Tonga) Lafaele Moala
- Captain: Ofaloto Kite
- Most caps: Hemaloto Polovili; Mikaele Pahulu; Soakai Vea (7)
- Top scorer: Hemaloto Polovili (4)
- FIFA code: TGA
First colours	Second colours

First international
- Samoa 4–0 Tonga (Fiji; 1 May 1999)

Biggest win
- Tonga 7–0 Papua New Guinea (Nuku'alofa, Tonga; 19 April 2024)

Biggest defeat
- Tonga 0–26 Australia (Nouméa, New Caledonia; 11 April 2005)

World Cup
- Appearances: 0

OFC Under-17 Championship
- Appearances: 10 (first in 1999)
- Best result: Quarterfinals (2023)

The Tonga national under-17 football team represents Tonga in international under-17 or youth football competitions and is controlled by the Tonga Football Association.

== Competition record ==
=== FIFA U-17 World Cup record ===
FIFA U-17 World Cup record
Year	Round	Pld	W	D	L	GF	GA	GD	Pts
(China) 1985 to (Egypt) 1997	Did not participate								
(New Zealand) 1999 to (Peru) 2005	Did not qualify								
(South Korea) 2007 to (Nigeria) 2009	Did not participate								
(Mexico) 2011 to (Qatar) 2025	Did not qualify								
(Qatar) 2026	To be determined								
Total	-	0	0	0	0	0	0	0	0

=== OFC U-17 Championship record ===
The OFC U-17 Championship is a tournament held once every two years to decide the two qualification spots reserved for the Oceania Football Confederation (OFC) and its representatives at the FIFA U-17 World Cup.

OFC U-17 Championship								Qualification record					
Year	Round	Pld	W	D	L	GF	GA	Pld	W	D	L	GF	GA
(New Zealand) 1983	Did not enter							No qualification					
(Chinese Taipei) 1986	Did not enter							No qualification					
(Australia) 1989	Did not enter							No qualification					
(New Zealand) 1991	Did not enter							No qualification					
(New Zealand) 1993	Did not enter							No qualification					
(Vanuatu) 1995	Did not enter							No qualification					
(New Zealand) 1997	Did not enter							No qualification					
(Fiji) 1999	Group stage	4	0	1	3	0	8	No qualification					
(Samoa) (Vanuatu) 2001	Group stage	4	0	1	3	0	29	No qualification					
(American Samoa) (Australia) (New Caledonia) 2003	Group stage	5	0	0	5	1	54	No qualification					
(New Caledonia) 2005	Group stage	3	0	0	3	0	61	No qualification					
(French Polynesia) 2007	Did not enter							No qualification					
(New Zealand) 2009	Did not enter							No qualification					
(New Zealand) 2011	Group stage	4	0	0	4	2	46	No qualification					
(Samoa) (Vanuatu) 2013	Did not qualify							3	1	0	2	6	12
(American Samoa) (Samoa) 2015	Group stage	4	1	0	3	3	32	No qualification					
(Samoa) (French Polynesia) 2017	Did not qualify							3	1	1	1	5	4
(Tonga) (Solomon Islands) 2018	Did not qualify							3	0	2	1	2	11
(Fiji) 2023	Quarter-finals	3	0	0	3	0	14	No qualification					
(Tonga) (French Polynesia) 2024	Did not qualify							3	2	0	1	10	9
(Tonga) (Solomon Islands) 2025	Did not qualify							3	1	1	1	9	8
(Tonga) (Papua New Guinea) 2026	Did not qualify							3	1	0	2	6	9
Total	Quarter-finals	27	1	2	24	6	244	16	6	4	8	38	53

== Squad for the 2017 OFC U-17 Championship first round ==
No.	Pos.	Player	Date of birth (age)	Caps	Goals	Club
1	GK	Alifaleti Likio	27 January 2000 (age 26)	3	0	(Tonga Football Association) Tonga Football Academy
20	GK	Tevita Kailea	4 June 2000 (age 26)	0	0	(Tonga Football Association) Tonga Football Academy
2	DF	Ofaloto Kite	26 April 2000 (age 26)	4	1	(Tonga Football Association) Veitongo
3	DF	Sione Vaenuku	27 May 2000 (age 26)	3	0	(Tonga Football Association) Tonga Football Academy
4	DF	Petueli Tokotaha	10 September 2000 (age 26)	1	1	(Tonga Football Association) Tonga Football Academy
5	DF	Falanisesi Mausia	21 March 2001 (age 25)	2	0	(Tonga Football Association) Tonga Football Academy
12	DF	William Senituli	24 February 2002 (age 24)	0	0	(Tonga Football Association) Tonga Football Academy
16	DF	Pesamino Tomasi	8 March 2001 (age 25)	1	0	(Tonga Football Association) Tonga Football Academy
18	DF	Onglea Filo	6 December 2001 (age 24)	0	0	(Tonga Football Association) Tonga Football Academy
6	MF	Tevita Kau	11 March 2001 (age 25)	3	2	(Tonga Football Association) Tonga Football Academy
7	MF	Tevita Sili	5 July 2000 (age 26)	3	0	(Tonga Football Association) Tonga Football Academy
8	MF	Kalakaua Faivailo	18 January 2001 (age 25)	3	1	(Tonga Football Association) Tonga Football Academy
13	MF	Opesi Tu'ifangaloka	21 July 2001 (age 25)	1	0	(Tonga Football Association) Tonga Football Academy
14	MF	Viliami Kaitapu	4 June 2001 (age 25)	1	0	(Tonga Football Association) Tonga Football Academy
17	MF	Sitaleki Fisi	11 February 2000 (age 26)	0	0	(Tonga Football Association) Tonga Football Academy
9	FW	Tuikaetau Falepapalangi	5 July 2000 (age 26)	3	0	(Tonga Football Association) Veitongo
10	FW	Viliami Tukia	7 January 2001 (age 25)	2	0	(Tonga Football Association) Tonga Football Academy
11	FW	Fonua Taliauli	12 June 2001 (age 25)	3	0	(Tonga Football Association) Tonga Football Academy
15	FW	William Nau	19 June 2000 (age 26)	3	0	(Tonga Football Association) Tonga Football Academy
19	FW	Alone Fakavai	10 July 2001 (age 25)	0	0	(Tonga Football Association) Tonga Football Academy

== List of coaches ==
- (Australia) Chris Williams (2011)
- (Tonga) Timote Moleni (2013-2016)
- (Tonga) Lafaele Moala (2018-)
