= 2017 OFC U-17 Championship =

2017 OFC U–17 Championship
Championnat d'Océanie de football des moins de 17 ans 2017

Tournament details
- Host country: Samoa (preliminary stage); Tahiti (final stage)
- Dates: 4–8 July 2016 (preliminary stage); 11–24 February 2017 (final stage)
- Teams: 8 (final stage); 11 (total) (from 1 confederation)
- Venue: 2 (in 2 host cities)

Final positions
- Champions: New Zealand (7th title)
- Runners-up: New Caledonia

Tournament statistics
- Matches played: 15
- Goals scored: 73 (4.87 per match)
- Top scorer: (New Zealand) Charles Spragg (7 goals)
- Best player: (New Zealand) Charles Spragg
- Best goalkeeper: (New Zealand) Zac Jones
- Fair play award: New Zealand

The 2017 OFC U-17 Championship was the 17th edition of the OFC U-17 Championship, the biennial international youth football tournament organized by the Oceania Football Confederation (OFC) for players aged 17 and below. The tournament was held in Tahiti between 11 and 24 February 2017.

In March 2015, FIFA decided that the OFC gets two slots at every FIFA U-20 and U-17 World Cup. So the top two teams qualified for the 2017 FIFA U-17 World Cup in India.

== Format ==
The qualification structure is as follows:

- First round: American Samoa, Cook Islands, Samoa and Tonga played a round-robin tournament in Samoa. The winner qualified for the tournament.
- Tournament (2017 OFC U-17 Championship): A total of eight teams (Fiji, New Caledonia, New Zealand, Papua New Guinea, Solomon Islands, Tahiti, Vanuatu, and the first round winner) played the tournament in Tahiti. For the group stage, they were divided into two groups of four teams. The top two teams of each group advanced to the knockout stage (semi-finals and final) to decide the winner of the 2017 OFC U-17 Championship and the two teams that qualified for the 2017 FIFA U-17 World Cup.

== Teams ==
All 11 FIFA-affiliated national teams from the OFC entered qualification. It is only the third time all 11 OFC member associations have entered an Oceania competition since 2006.

Seeding	Teams	No. of teams
First round entrants	American Samoa; Cook Islands; Samoa; Tonga	4
Second round entrants	Fiji; New Caledonia; New Zealand; Papua New Guinea; Solomon Islands; Tahiti; Vanuatu	7

== Venues ==
The final round of the tournament were played in two venues in Tahiti.

Pirae	Mahina
Stade Pater	Stade Mahina
17.7308985°S 168.315498°E	
Capacity:11,700	Capacity:2,500
2017 OFC U-17 Championship (Tahiti)

== Match officials ==
Referees

- (Fiji) Salesh Chand
- (New Caledonia) Médéric Lacour
- (New Zealand) Matt Conger
- (Solomon Islands) Nelson Sogo
- (Solomon Islands) Hamilton Siau
- (Solomon Islands) George Time
- (French Polynesia) Norbert Hauata
- (French Polynesia) Kader Zitouni
- (Papua New Guinea) Roger Adams
- (Vanuatu) Arnold Tari

Assistant Referees

- (Cook Islands) John Pareanga
- (Papua New Guinea) Noah Kusunan
- (Tonga) Tevita Makasini
- (Tonga) Folio Moeaki
- (Tonga) Sione Teu
- (New Caledonia) Marc Sinyeue
- (New Zealand) Gareth Sheehan
- (Papua New Guinea) Wase Bafinu
- (Samoa) Malaetala Sofe
- (Vanuatu) Denson Sale

== First round ==
The preliminary tournament was hosted by Samoa between 2 and 8 July 2016. Due to unforeseen circumstances, matchday one was postponed from 2 to 4 July, and matchday 2 was postponed from 5 to 6 July. The winner qualified for the final tournament.

All times are local, WST (UTC+13).

Pos	Team	Pld	W	D	L	GF	GA	GD	Pts	Qualification
1	Samoa (H)	3	2	1	0	6	1	+5	7	Second round
2	Cook Islands	3	2	0	1	6	5	+1	6	
3	Tonga	3	1	1	1	5	4	+1	4	
4	American Samoa	3	0	0	3	1	8	−7	0	

Source: OFC
(H) Hosts
4 July 2016
16:30

Tonga	2–3	Cook Islands
Faivailo 45'; Tokotaha 90+1' (pen.)	Report	Tomasi 19' (o.g.); Tiputoa 20'; Ngametua 89'

J.S. Blatter Stadium, Apia
Attendance: 200
Referee: Averii Jacques (Tahiti)
4 July 2016
19:00

Samoa	3–0	American Samoa
Sauiluma 4'; Tumua 68', 73'	Report

J.S. Blatter Stadium, Apia
Attendance: 500
Referee: Amos Anio (Papua New Guinea)

6 July 2016
16:30

American Samoa	1–3	Cook Islands
Pouli 29'	Report	Tiputoa 21', 25'; Ngametua 90+3'

J.S. Blatter Stadium, Apia
Attendance: 300
Referee: Robinson Banga (Vanuatu)
6 July 2016
19:00

Tonga	1–1	Samoa
Kau 71'	Report	Mano 3'

J.S. Blatter Stadium, Apia
Attendance: 350
Referee: Médéric Lacour (New Caledonia)

8 July 2016
16:30

American Samoa	0–2	Tonga
	Report	Kau 11'; Kite 32'

J.S. Blatter Stadium, Apia
Attendance: 200
Referee: Robinson Banga (Vanuatu)
8 July 2016
19:00

Cook Islands	0–2	Samoa
	Report	Savelio 90+1'; Sauiluma 90+4'

J.S. Blatter Stadium, Apia
Attendance: 300
Referee: Averii Jacques (Tahiti)

== Second round ==
The final tournament was scheduled for 11–24 February 2017 (originally 15–29 January 2017). Tahiti were announced as the host in December 2015.

The draw was held on 18 July 2016. The eight teams were drawn into two groups of four teams. There was no seeding, except that hosts Tahiti were assigned to position A1 in the draw. The top two teams of each group advanced to the semi-finals.

All times are local, TAHT (UTC−10).

=== Group A ===
Pos	Team	Pld	W	D	L	GF	GA	GD	Pts	Qualification
1	New Caledonia	3	2	1	0	7	5	+2	7	Knockout stage
2	Papua New Guinea	3	1	1	1	7	7	0	4	Knockout stage
3	Tahiti (H)	3	1	1	1	3	3	0	4	
4	Vanuatu	3	0	1	2	5	7	−2	1	

Source: OFC
(H) Hosts
11 February 2017
16:00

New Caledonia	3–2	Papua New Guinea
Gope-Fenepej 5', 31'; Iwa 90+3' (pen.)	Report	Kapai 35'; Kerobin 64'

Stade Mahina, Mahina
Attendance: 900
Referee: George Time (Solomon Islands)
11 February 2017
19:00

Tahiti	1–0	Vanuatu
Vivi 11'	Report

Stade Mahina, Mahina
Attendance: 1,600
Referee: Matthew Conger (New Zealand)

14 February 2017
16:00

Papua New Guinea	3–3	Vanuatu
Pukue 16'; Kerobin 45+4' (pen.), 81'	Report	Ngwele 25', 55'; Maguekon 83'

Stade Mahina, Mahina
Attendance: 600
Referee: Hamilton Siau (Solomon Islands)
14 February 2017
19:00

Tahiti	1–1	New Caledonia
Beaumert 45+3'	Report	Caihe 90+1'

Stade Mahina, Mahina
Attendance: 1,500
Referee: Salesh Chand (Fiji)

Group A matches of matchday 3 were moved from Stade Mahina, Mahina to Stade Pater, Pirae due to adverse weather conditions.

17 February 2017
16:00

Vanuatu	2–3	New Caledonia
Tari 84'; Napau 88' (pen.)	Report	Thahnaena 37'; Gope-Fenepej 72'; Iwa 75' (pen.)

Stade Pater, Pirae
Attendance: 500
Referee: George Time (Solomon Islands)
17 February 2017
19:00

Papua New Guinea	2–1	Tahiti
J. Allen 71'; Simongi 87'	Report	Kaspard 10'

Stade Pater, Pirae
Attendance: 1,500
Referee: Matthew Conger (New Zealand)

=== Group B ===
Pos	Team	Pld	W	D	L	GF	GA	GD	Pts	Qualification
1	New Zealand	3	3	0	0	18	1	+17	9	Knockout stage
2	Solomon Islands	3	1	1	1	14	3	+11	4	Knockout stage
3	Fiji	3	1	1	1	4	6	−2	4	
4	Samoa	3	0	0	3	0	26	−26	0	

Source: OFC
12 February 2017
16:00

Samoa	0–11	New Zealand
	Report	Spragg 5', 20', 40', 90+4'; Ebbinge 10'; Sinclair 21'; Palmer 67', 70', 90+3'; Whyte 86'; Mata 89'

Stade Pater, Pirae
Attendance: 527
Referee: Joel Hopkken (Vanuatu)
12 February 2017
19:00

Fiji	1–1	Solomon Islands
Dau 4'	Report	Mana 52'

Stade Pater, Pirae
Attendance: 550
Referee: Norbert Hauata (Tahiti)

15 February 2017
16:00

New Zealand	2–1	Solomon Islands
Williams 3'; Spragg 84'	Report	Kaoni 48'

Stade Pater, Pirae
Attendance: 500
Referee: Abdelkader Zitouni (Tahiti)
15 February 2017
19:00

Fiji	3–0	Samoa
Matalau 9'; Dau 17', 62'	Report

Stade Pater, Pirae
Attendance: 800
Referee: Arnold Tari (Vanuatu)

18 February 2017
16:00

Solomon Islands	12–0	Samoa
Mekawir 9', 19', 30'; Toata 29'; Kaoni 45+4', 67', 80', 88'; Keana 53', 65'; Allen 57', 79'	Report

Stade Pater, Pirae
Attendance: 300
Referee: Joel Hopkken (Vanuatu)
18 February 2017
19:00

New Zealand	5–0	Fiji
M. Jones 12', 90+1'; Just 41'; Mata 76'; Spragg 90+4' (pen.)	Report

Stade Pater, Pirae
Attendance: 750
Referee: Médéric Lacour (New Caledonia)

== Knockout stage ==
=== Bracket ===
Semi-finals
21 February – Mahina
New Caledonia	3
Solomon Islands	2
21 February – Mahina
New Zealand	2
Papua New Guinea	1

Final
24 February – Pirae
New Caledonia	0
New Zealand	7

=== Semi-finals ===
Winners qualified for 2017 FIFA U-17 World Cup.

21 February 2017
16:00

New Caledonia	3–2	Solomon Islands
Bako 23'; Jeno 68'; Longue 80'	Report	Toata 62'; Allen 90+4'

Stade Mahina, Mahina
Attendance: 400
Referee: Matthew Conger (New Zealand)

21 February 2017
19:00

New Zealand	2–1	Papua New Guinea
Pukue 3' (o.g.); Whyte 90+3'	Report	Kerobin 34'

Stade Mahina, Mahina
Attendance: 1,000
Referee: Norbert Hauata (Tahiti)

=== Final ===
24 February 2017
19:00

New Caledonia	0–7	New Zealand
	Report	Just 33'; Cacace 36'; Mata 62', 68'; Conroy 70'; Spragg 72'; Palmer 90+1'

Stade Pater, Pirae
Attendance: 2,000
Referee: Norbert Hauata (Tahiti)

== Goalscorers ==
7 goals

- (New Zealand) Charles Spragg

5 goals

- (Solomon Islands) Junior Kaoni

4 goals

- (Papua New Guinea) Barthy Kerobin
- (New Zealand) Max Mata
- (New Zealand) Matthew Palmer

3 goals

- (Cook Islands) Conroy Tiputoa
- (Fiji) Ratu Dau
- (New Caledonia) Paul Gope-Fenepej
- (Solomon Islands) Junior Allen
- (Solomon Islands) Ali Mekawir

2 goals

- (Cook Islands) Kimiora Ngametua
- (New Caledonia) Bernard Iwa
- (New Zealand) Matthew Jones
- (New Zealand) Elijah Just
- (New Zealand) Oliver Whyte
- (Samoa) Willie Sauiluma
- (Samoa) Dilo Tumua
- (Solomon Islands) Don Keana
- (Solomon Islands) Steward Toata
- (Tonga) Tevita Kau
- (Vanuatu) Dilland Ngwele

1 goal

- (American Samoa) Takai Pouli
- (Fiji) Semi Matalau
- (New Caledonia) Pierre Bako
- (New Caledonia) Robert Caihe
- (New Caledonia) Abiezer Jeno
- (New Caledonia) Vita Longue
- (New Caledonia) Lionel Thahnaena
- (New Zealand) Liberato Cacace
- (New Zealand) Matthew Conroy
- (New Zealand) Willem Ebbinge
- (New Zealand) Kingsley Sinclair
- (New Zealand) Jake Williams
- (Papua New Guinea) Jonathan Allen
- (Papua New Guinea) Kimson Kapai
- (Papua New Guinea) Aben Pukue
- (Papua New Guinea) Emmanuel Simongi
- (Samoa) Lotial Mano
- (Samoa) Osa Savelio
- (Solomon Islands) Elis Mana
- (French Polynesia) Kalahani Beaumert
- (French Polynesia) Eddy Kaspard
- (French Polynesia) Yann Vivi
- (Tonga) Kalakaua Faivailo
- (Tonga) Ofa Kite
- (Tonga) Petueli Tokotaha
- (Vanuatu) Zidane Maguekon
- (Vanuatu) Rhydley Napau
- (Vanuatu) Jayson Tari

1 own goal

- (Papua New Guinea) Aben Pukue (playing against New Zealand)
- (Tonga) Pesamino Tomasi (playing against Cook Islands)

== Awards ==
The Golden Ball Award is awarded to the most outstanding player of the tournament. The Golden Glove Award is awarded to the best goalkeeper of the tournament. The Golden Boot Award is awarded to the top scorer of the tournament. The Fair Play Award is awarded to the team with the best disciplinary record at the tournament.

Award	Recipient
Golden Ball	(New Zealand) Charles Spragg
Golden Glove	(New Zealand) Zac Jones
Golden Boot	(New Zealand) Charles Spragg (7 goals)
Fair Play Award	New Zealand

== Qualified teams for FIFA U-17 World Cup ==
The following two teams from OFC qualified for the 2017 FIFA U-17 World Cup.

Team	Qualified on	Previous appearances in tournament^{1}
New Zealand	21 February 2017	7 (1997, 1999, 2007, 2009, 2011, 2013, 2015)
New Caledonia	21 February 2017	0 (Debut)

^{1} Bold indicates champion for that year. Italic indicates host for that year.
