= 2003 OFC U-17 Championship =

2003 OFC Under-17 Football Championship
Tournament details
- Host countries: American Samoa; Australia
- Dates: 13 February – 1 March
- Teams: 11 (from 1 confederation)
- Venue: 3 (in 3 host cities)

Final positions
- Champions: Australia (9th title)
- Runners-up: New Caledonia

Tournament statistics
- Matches played: 27
- Goals scored: 138 (5.11 per match)
- Top scorer(s): (Australia) Richard Cardozo (13 goals)

The 2003 OFC U-17 Championship was the 10th edition of the OFC's under-17 Championship. It was held in American Samoa, Australia and New Caledonia.

The winning side qualified for the 2003 FIFA U-17 World Championship in Finland.

Australia won their ninth (and third consecutive) title after beating New Caledonia 7–1 over two legs in the final.

== Host selection ==
Solomon Islands were originally selected as the host nation for Group B, but agreed to move the Group to Australia due to safety concerns.

Australia and New Caledonia agreed to stage both legs of the final in New Caledonia.

== Qualification ==
All member teams qualified automatically. Papua New Guinea withdrew before the tournament began.

The following teams participated in the tournament:

- American Samoa
- Australia
- Cook Islands
- Fiji
- New Caledonia
- New Zealand
- Samoa
- Solomon Islands
- Tahiti
- Tonga
- Vanuatu

== Venues ==
Matches were played in three cities: Veterans Memorial Stadium in Tafuna, Maroochydore Soccer Centre in Maroochydore and Stade Pentecost in Noumea.

== Squads ==
Nations named squads of up to 20 players for the tournament.

== Group stage ==
=== Group A ===
Times are listed in Samoa Standard Time

Team	Pld	W	D	L	GF	GA	GD	Pts
New Caledonia	4	4	0	0	11	0	+11	12
Fiji	4	3	0	1	18	3	+15	9
Cook Islands	4	1	1	2	2	8	-6	4
Samoa	4	1	0	3	3	10	-7	3
American Samoa	4	0	1	3	1	14	-13	1

13 February 2003
16:00

American Samoa	0–0	Cook Islands
	Report

Veterans Memorial Stadium, Pago Pago
Attendance: 1,500
Referee: Peter O'Leary (New Zealand)

13 February 2003
18:00

New Caledonia	2–0	Fiji
Vendegou 45' (pen.); Wamowe 79'	Report

Veterans Memorial Stadium, Pago Pago
Attendance: 1,500
Referee: Lencie Fred (Vanuatu)

15 February 2003
16:00

American Samoa	0–3	New Caledonia
	Report	Boanemoa 32', 88'; Hnangeje 90'

Veterans Memorial Stadium, Pago Pago
Attendance: 2,000
Referee: Lencie Fred (Vanuatu)

15 February 2003
18:00

Cook Islands	1–0	Samoa
Jim 42'	Report

Veterans Memorial Stadium, Pago Pago
Attendance: 2,000
Referee: Andrew Moli (Solomon Islands)

17 February 2003
16:00

Samoa	0–6	Fiji
	Report	Seru 46'; Vakatalesau 50', 86'; Prakashi 51'; Dunadamu 70'; Rao 73'

Veterans Memorial Stadium, Pago Pago
Attendance: 600
Referee: Nelson Sogo (Solomon Islands)

17 February 2003
18:00

New Caledonia	4–0	Cook Islands
Hnangeje 14'; Wamowe 47', 50', 65'	Report

Veterans Memorial Stadium, Pago Pago
Attendance: 600
Referee: Peter O'Leary (New Zealand)

19 February 2003
16:00

Cook Islands	1–4	Fiji
Strickland 77' (pen.)	Report	Vakatalesau 2'; Dunadamu 25', 45', 50'

Veterans Memorial Stadium, Pago Pago
Referee: Andrew Moli (Solomon Islands)

February 2003
18:00

American Samoa	1–3	Samoa
Ott 50'	Report	Manila 10'; Slater 37'; Faalavaau 62'

Veterans Memorial Stadium, Pago Pago
Referee: Nelson Sogo (Solomon Islands)

21 February 2003
9:00

American Samoa	0–8	Fiji
	Report	Vakatalesau 7', 70', 74'; Wilson 10'; Rao 41'; Dunadamu 44'; Singh 75'; Nauer 76' (o.g.)

Veterans Memorial Stadium, Pago Pago
Attendance: 600
Referee: Lencie Fred (Vanuatu)

21 February 2003
11:00

New Caledonia	2–0	Samoa
Hnangeje 54', 65'	Report

Veterans Memorial Stadium, Pago Pago
Attendance: 600
Referee: Peter O'Leary (New Zealand)

=== Group B ===
Times are listed in Australian Eastern Standard Time (AEST)

Team	Pld	W	D	L	GF	GA	GD	Pts
Australia	5	5	0	0	33	2	+31	15
Vanuatu	5	3	1	1	17	7	+10	10
New Zealand	5	2	2	1	19	4	+15	8
Solomon Islands	5	2	1	2	18	6	+12	7
Tahiti	5	1	0	4	7	22	-15	3
Tonga	5	0	0	5	1	54	-53	0

15 February 2003
14:00

Australia	3–1	Solomon Islands
Cardozo 2'; Casey 15' (pen.); Hilton 42' (pen.)	Report	Anisua 90'

Maroochydore Soccer Centre, Maroochydore
Attendance: 1,500
Referee: Neil Fox (New Zealand)

15 February 2003
16:00

Tonga	0–11	Vanuatu
	Report	Maleb 2', 12', 26'; M. Peter 5'; Joe 17'; Harry 23', 44'; R. Peter 36'; Tabe 77'; Varaismaite 85'; Simeon 89'

Maroochydore Soccer Centre, Maroochydore
Attendance: 1,500
Referee: Intaz Shah (Fiji)

15 February 2003
18:00

New Zealand	4–0	Tahiti
Scott 9'; White 15'; Bright 58'; Henderson 75'	Report

Maroochydore Soccer Centre, Maroochydore
Attendance: 1,500
Referee: Mark Shield (Australia)

17 February 2003
14:00

New Zealand	1–1	Vanuatu
Old 24'	Report	Maleb 49'

Maroochydore Soccer Centre, Maroochydore
Attendance: 350
Referee: Charles Ariiotima (Tahiti)

17 February 2003
16:00

Australia	9–0	Tahiti
Paartalu 15', 17'; Casey 28', 35', 89'; Smits 49'; Cardozo 69', 81', 82'	Report

Maroochydore Soccer Centre, Maroochydore
Attendance: 350
Referee: Gidas Bayung (Papua New Guinea)

17 February 2003
18:00

Tonga	0–12	Solomon Islands
	Report	Totori 2', 70'; Anisua 9'; Fifi 28', 30', 89'; Joe 34'; Horoinima 43'; Haikai 57'; Anisi 58'; Ramoaea 68' (pen.); Honitalo 90+1'

Maroochydore Soccer Centre, Maroochydore
Attendance: 350
Referee: Neil Fox (New Zealand)

20 February 2003
14:00

Australia	4–0	Vanuatu
Hilton 41', 44', 79' (pen.); Smits 65'	Report

Maroochydore Soccer Centre, Maroochydore
Referee: Intaz Shah (Fiji)

20 February 2003
16:00

Tahiti	1–5	Solomon Islands
Poroiae 59'	Report	Totori 16', 45'; Fifi 52'; Honitalo 62'; Joe 63'

Maroochydore Soccer Centre, Maroochydore
Attendance: 300
Referee: Mark Shield (Australia)

20 February 2003
18:00

Tonga	0–13	New Zealand
	Report	Hayne 2', 31', 51'; Broderson 8', 39', 54'; Wheeler 28'; Scott 44'; Bright 56', 73', 85'; Henderson 82'; White 89'

Maroochydore Soccer Centre, Maroochydore
Attendance: 300
Referee: Charles Ariiotima (Tahiti)

22 February 2003
14:00

Tahiti	4–1	Tonga
Poroiae 16', 68'; Horoi 56'; Teriitaumihau 89' (pen.)	Report	Pau 25' (pen.)

Maroochydore Soccer Centre, Maroochydore
Attendance: 1,000
Referee: Mark Shield (Australia)

22 February 2003
16:00

Solomon Islands	0–2	Vanuatu
	Report	Kanegai 2'; Joe 76'

Maroochydore Soccer Centre, Maroochydore
Attendance: 1,000
Referee: Charles Ariiotima (Tahiti)

22 February 2003
18:00

Australia	3–1	New Zealand
Smits 13'; Hilton 59'; Cardozo 90+2'	Report	Old 37'

Maroochydore Soccer Centre, Maroochydore
Attendance: 3,000
Referee: Gidas Bayung (Papua New Guinea)

24 February 2003
14:00

Solomon Islands	0–0	New Zealand
	Report

Maroochydore Soccer Centre, Maroochydore
Attendance: 250
Referee: Intaz Shah (Fiji)

24 February 2003
16:00

Australia	14–0	Tonga
Cardozo 1', 6', 28', 36', 41', 43'; Richardson 11', 37'; Sarkies 39'; Karavitis 52'; Totani 65'; Casey 72'; Hilton 75'; Martino 89'	Report

Maroochydore Soccer Centre, Maroochydore
Attendance: 250
Referee: Neil Fox (New Zealand)

24 February 2003
18:00

Vanuatu	3–2	Tahiti
Ligo 2'; Harry 34'; Kanegai 74'	Report	Tahi 15'; Sinjoux 67'

Maroochydore Soccer Centre, Maroochydore
Attendance: 250
Referee: Gidas Bayung (Papua New Guinea)

== Knockout stage ==
=== Final ===
==== First leg ====
27 February 2003
16:00

New Caledonia	1–3	Australia
Wamowe 67'	Report	Sarkies 24'; Cardozo 42', 47'

Stade Pentecost, Noumea
Attendance: 300
Referee: Peter O'Leary (New Zealand)

==== Second leg ====
1 March 2003
9:00

New Caledonia	0–4	Australia
	Report	Leijer 52'; Paartalu 61'; Deegan 74'; Sarkies 82' (pen.)

Stade Pentecost, Noumea
Referee: Derek Rugg (New Zealand)

- Australia qualified for the 2003 FIFA U-17 World Cup.

== Goalscorers ==
13 goals

- (Australia) Richard Cardozo

6 goals

- (Australia) Matt Hilton
- (Fiji) Osea Vakatalesau

5 goals

- (Australia) Adam Casey
- (Fiji) Maciu Dunadamu
- (New Caledonia) Mone Wamowe

4 goals

- (New Caledonia) Albert Hnageje
- (New Zealand) Kris Bright
- (Solomon Islands) Michael Fifi
- (Solomon Islands) Benjamin Totori
- (Vanuatu) Victor Maleb

3 goals

- (Australia) Eric Paartalu
- (Australia) Kristian Sarkies
- (Australia) Tim Smits
- (New Zealand) Ricky Broderson
- (New Zealand) Jason Hayne
- (French Polynesia) Hiro Poroiae
- (Vanuatu) John Alick Harry

2 goals

- (Australia) Dane Richardson
- (Fiji) Johnny Rao
- (New Caledonia) Raphael Boanemoa
- (New Zealand) Craig Henderson
- (New Zealand) Steven Old
- (New Zealand) Jesse Scott
- (New Zealand) Michael White
- (Solomon Islands) Richard Anisua
- (Solomon Islands) Earl Honitalo
- (Solomon Islands) Timothy Joe
- (Vanuatu) Roger Joe
- (Vanuatu) Sylverstone Kanegai

1 goal

- (American Samoa) Ramin Ott
- (Australia) Matthew Deegan
- (Australia) Evangelos Karavitis
- (Australia) Adrian Leijer
- (Australia) Angelo Martino
- (Australia) Oliver Totani
- (Cook Islands) Frank Jim
- (Cook Islands) Geoffrey Strickland
- (Fiji) Sheikar Prakashi
- (Fiji) Noa Seru
- (Fiji) Aeron Singh
- (Fiji) Joshua Wilson
- (New Caledonia) Kenjy Vendegou
- (New Zealand) Croyden Wheeler
- (Samoa) Kennedy Faalavaau
- (Samoa) Pio Manila
- (Samoa) James Slater
- (Solomon Islands) Augustine Anisi
- (Solomon Islands) Leslie Haikai
- (Solomon Islands) Jeffrey Horoinima
- (Solomon Islands) David Ramoaea
- (French Polynesia) Jeff Horoi
- (French Polynesia) Tinomana Sinjoux
- (French Polynesia) Jason Tahi
- (French Polynesia) Matahi Teriitaumihau
- (Tonga) Peni Pau
- (Vanuatu) Charles Ligo
- (Vanuatu) Manuel Peter
- (Vanuatu) Raul Peter
- (Vanuatu) John Mark Simeon
- (Vanuatu) Georges Tabe
- (Vanuatu) John Varaismaite

Own goals

- (American Samoa) Albert Nauer (playing against Fiji)
