= Roger Joe =

Vanuatuan footballer

Personal information
- Full name: Roger Joe
- Date of birth: 21 January 1986 (age 40)
- Place of birth: Port Vila, Vanuatu
- Position: Defender

Team information
- Current team: Tafea FC

Senior career*
| Years | Team | Apps | (Gls) |
| 2004–2007 | Shepherds United | | |
| 2007–2009 | Yatel F.C. | | |
| 2009– | Tafea FC | | |

International career^{‡}
| 2003– | Vanuatu | 7 | (0) |
Medal record
Men's football
Representing Vanuatu
Pacific Games
| Bronze medal – third place | 2003 Fiji |
- * Club domestic league appearances and goals as of 11 April 2009 ‡ National team caps and goals as of 11 April 2009

Roger Joe (born 21 January 1986 in Port Vila) is a football defender from Vanuatu. He currently plays for Vanuatu Premia Divisen side Tafea FC and the Vanuatu national football team.

== International matches ==
| # | Date | Venue | Opponent | Result | Competition |
|---|---|---|---|---|---|
| 1. | 15 May 2004 | Apia | Samoa | 0–3 | 2006 FIFA World Cup qualification |
| 2. | 19 May 2004 | Apia | Fiji | 0–3 | 2006 FIFA World Cup qualification |
| 3. | 31 May 2004 | Adelaide | Fiji | 1–0 | 2006 FIFA World Cup qualification |
| 4. | 2 June 2004 | Adelaide | New Zealand | 4–2 | 2006 FIFA World Cup qualification |
| 5. | 4 June 2004 | Adelaide | Australia | 3–0 | 2006 FIFA World Cup qualification |
| 6. | 6 June 2004 | Adelaide | Tahiti | 2–1 | 2006 FIFA World Cup qualification |
| 7. | 10 September 2008 | Port Vila | Fiji | 2–1 | 2010 FIFA World Cup qualification |

== Honours ==
Vanuatu

- Pacific Games: Bronze Medalist, 2003
