= Fiji national under-17 football team =

National under-17 association football team representing Fiji

Fiji U17
- Nickname: Bula Boys
- Association: Fiji Football Association
- Confederation: OFC (Oceania)
- Head coach: Sunil Kumar
- Captain: Patrick Joseph
- Most caps: Iosefo Verevou (8)
- Top scorer: Osea Vakatalesau, Iosefo Verevou (6)
- FIFA code: FIJ
First colours	Second colours

First international
- New Caledonia 4 - 3 Fiji (Auckland, New Zealand; December 3, 1983)

Biggest win
- American Samoa 0 - 9 Fiji (Auckland, New Zealand; January 8, 2011)

Biggest defeat
- Fiji 1 - 9 Saudi Arabia (Al-Ahsa, Saudi Arabia; October 19, 2025)

World Cup
- Appearances: 2 (first in 2025)
- Best result: Group stage (2025)

OFC Under-17 Championship
- Appearances: 18 (first in 1983)
- Best result: Runners-up (1999)

The Fiji national under-17 football team is the national U-17 team of Fiji and is controlled by the Fiji Football Association.

== Competition Record ==
=== FIFA U-17 World Cup record ===
FIFA U-17 World Cup record
Year	Round	Pld	W	D	L	GF	GA	GD	Pts
(China) 1985 to (South Korea) 2007	Did not qualify								
(Nigeria) 2009	Did not participate								
(Mexico) 2011 to (Indonesia) 2023	Did not qualify								
(Qatar) 2025	Group stage	3	0	0	3	0	20	-20	0
(Qatar) 2026	In progress	1	0	0	1	0	6	-6	0
(Qatar) 2027	Qualified								
Total:2/21	Group stage	4	0	0	4	0	26	-26	0

=== OFC U-17 Championship record ===
The OFC U-17 Championship is a tournament held once every two years to decide the only two qualification spots for the Oceania Football Confederation (OFC) and its representatives at the FIFA U-17 World Cup.

OFC U-17 Championship
Year	Round	Pld	W	D	L	GF	GA	GD	Pts
(New Zealand) 1983	Fifth place	5	0	2	3	6	18	-12	2
(Chinese Taipei) 1986	Fifth place	4	0	2	2	2	8	-6	2
(Australia) 1989	Fourth place	4	1	0	3	9	24	-15	2
(New Zealand) 1991	Third place	4	0	0	4	4	21	-17	0
(New Zealand) 1993	Fourth place	3	0	1	2	2	11	-9	1
(Vanuatu) 1995	Group stage	1	0	0	1	0	4	-4	0
(New Zealand) 1997	Fourth place	5	2	0	3	5	13	-8	6
(Fiji) 1999	Runners-up	7	4	1	2	37	13	+24	12
(Samoa) & (Vanuatu) 2001	Group stage	4	1	0	3	9	5	+4	3
(American Samoa) & (Australia) & (New Caledonia) 2003	Group stage	4	3	0	1	18	3	+15	9
(New Caledonia) 2005	Group stage	4	2	1	1	9	6	+3	7
(French Polynesia) 2007	Third place	3	0	2	1	2	4	-2	2
(New Zealand) 2009	Did not participate	-	-	-	-	-	-	-	-
(New Zealand) 2011	Group stage	4	1	0	3	10	6	+4	3
(Samoa) & (Vanuatu) 2013	Fourth place	5	2	1	2	10	8	+2	7
(American Samoa) & (Samoa) 2015	Group stage	5	2	1	2	10	12	-2	7
(Samoa) & (French Polynesia) 2017	Group stage	3	1	1	1	4	6	-2	4
(Tonga) & (Solomon Islands) 2018	Fourth place	5	2	0	3	6	10	-4	6
(Fiji) 2023	Fourth place	5	3	0	2	10	7	+3	9
Total	Runners-up	75	24	12	39	153	179	-26	82

== Current Technical Staff ==
Position	
Head coach	(Fiji) Sunil Kumar
Assistant coach	(Fiji) Anginesh Prasad
Goalkeeper coach	(France) Xavier Henneuse
Physiotherapist	(Fiji) Varoon Karan

== Current squad ==
- The following players were called up for the 2023 OFC U-17 Championship matches.
- Match dates: 11 – 28 January 2023

No.	Pos.	Player	Date of birth (age)	Club
1	GK	Savenaca Nabati	6 July 2006 (age 20)	(Fiji Football Association) Tavua
22	GK	Kartik Sharma	6 October 2006 (age 20)	(Fiji Football Association) Labasa
23	GK	Ilisoni Koro	18 November 2006 (age 20)	(Fiji Football Association) Ba
24	GK	Areya Khrish Prasad	25 May 2007 (age 19)	(New Zealand Football) Auckland United
2	DF	Waisea Nagonelevu	30 June 2006 (age 20)	(Fiji Football Association) Ba
3	DF	Sahil Deo	19 May 2006 (age 20)	(Fiji Football Association) Labasa
4	DF	Aron Naicker	28 August 2006 (age 20)	(Fiji Football Association) Nadi
5	DF	Isimeli Gavidi	29 January 2006 (age 20)	(Fiji Football Association) Lautoka
6	DF	Luke Vakavotu	29 August 2006 (age 20)	(Fiji Football Association) Seaqaqa
16	DF	William Khan	31 May 2006 (age 20)	(Fiji Football Association) Nadroga
17	DF	Jacob Seninawanawa	9 January 2006 (age 20)	(Fiji Football Association) Nadi
21	DF	Vinayak Rao	6 April 2006 (age 20)	(Fiji Football Association) Nadi
7	MF	Prashant Kumar	3 March 2006 (age 20)	(New Zealand Football) Manukau United
8	MF	Richard Swami	17 June 2006 (age 20)	(New Zealand Football) Auckland City
11	MF	Delon Shankar	31 March 2007 (age 19)	(Fiji Football Association) Rewa
12	MF	Watisoni Batirerega	8 June 2006 (age 20)	(Fiji Football Association) Dreketi
13	MF	Peni Misipopi	29 January 2006 (age 20)	(Fiji Football Association) Labasa
15	MF	Neeraj Sharma	27 April 2006 (age 20)	(Fiji Football Association) Rewa
19	MF	Nirav Nihal Kumar	14 January 2007 (age 19)	(Fiji Football Association) Nasinu
9	FW	Sailimone Ravonkula	20 April 2006 (age 20)	(Fiji Football Association) Labasa
10	FW	Ibraheem Afazal	12 April 2007 (age 19)	(Football Australia) APIA Leichhardt
14	FW	Vilikesa Vosagaga	19 May 2007 (age 19)	(Fiji Football Association) Seaqaqa
18	FW	Petero Maivalenisau	1 January 2006 (age 20)	(Fiji Football Association) Seaqaqa

== List of coaches ==
- (Fiji) Hussain Sahib (2010–2011)
- (Fiji) Kamal Swamy (2012–2015)
- (Fiji) Yogendra Dutt (2014–2015)
- (Fiji) Shalen Lal (2016–2017)
- (Fiji) Rupeni Luvu (2017–2019)
- (Fiji) Sunil Kumar (2019–present)
