= 2013 OFC U-17 Championship =

Championnat d'Océanie de football des moins de 17 ans 2013

Tournament details
- Host country: Vanuatu
- Dates: 17–25 April
- Teams: 6 (from 1 confederation)
- Venue: 1 (in 1 host city)

Final positions
- Champions: New Zealand (5th title)
- Runners-up: New Caledonia
- Third place: Vanuatu
- Fourth place: Fiji

Tournament statistics
- Matches played: 15
- Goals scored: 55 (3.67 per match)
- Attendance: 62,250 (4,150 per match)
- Top scorer(s): (New Zealand) Stuart Holthusen (New Zealand) Monty Patterson (6 goals each)

The 2013 OFC U-17 Championship was the 15th edition of the OFC's Under 17 championship, the biennial football championship of the Oceanian Confederation. All matches took place at Chapuis stadium, Luganville in Vanuatu from 17 to 27 April. 6 teams contested the final round of the championship after the Solomon Islands Football Federation withdrew, as it could only financially support its beach soccer and futsal sides in national competition.

As winners, New Zealand qualified as Oceania's representative for the 2013 FIFA U-17 World Cup.

== Qualification ==
5 teams 'pre-qualified' for the competition (before the Solomon Islands withdrawal), with the final team being decided through a preliminary round hosted by Samoa in late January 2013.

- Fiji
- New Caledonia
- New Zealand
- Papua New Guinea
- Vanuatu (Host nation)
- Cook Islands (preliminary round winner)

== Preliminary round ==
A preliminary competition was required to find the Sixth and final place in the competition. The mini-tournament was hosted by the Samoan Football Federation between 22 and 26 January 2013.

Team	Pld	W	D	L	GF	GA	GD	Pts
Cook Islands	3	2	0	1	9	5	+4	6
American Samoa	3	1	1	1	7	5	+2	4
Samoa	3	1	1	1	6	6	0	4
Tonga	3	1	0	2	6	12	−6	3

All Times are local Time (UTC+14:00)

22 January 2013
15:00

Samoa	2–2	American Samoa
Filisi Keni 15', 69' (pen.)	Report	Kaleopa Siligi 10'; Sinisi Tua 35'

National Stadium, Apia
Attendance: 500
Referee: Rakesh Varman (Fiji)

22 January 2013
17:00

Tonga	1–7	Cook Islands
Hemaloto Polovili 41'	Report	Maro Bonsu-Maro 6', 37'; Pekay Edwards 9'; Sunai Joseph 19'; Mateo Pahulu 43' (o.g.); Wiremu Temata 45'; Morgan Wichman 55'

National Stadium, Apia
Attendance: 200
Referee: Robinson Banga (Vanuatu)

24 January 2013
15:00

Samoa	3–2	Tonga
Paulo Scanlan 16', 51', 53'	report	Hemaloto Polovili 50', 77' (pen.)

National Stadium, Apia
Attendance: 400
Referee: Pari Oito (Tahiti)

24 January 2013
17:00

Cook Islands	0–3	American Samoa
	report	Sinisi Tua 19', 90+2'; Kaleopa Siligi 39' (pen.)

National Stadium, Apia
Attendance: 300
Referee: Matt Conger (New Zealand)

26 January 2013
15:00

Cook Islands	2–1	Samoa
Takuina Tararo 59'; Dwayne Tiputoa 86'	report	Sue Pelesa 23'

National Stadium, Apia
Attendance: 700
Referee: Rakesh Varman (Fiji)

26 January 2013
17:00

American Samoa	2–3	Tonga
Paia Ipiniu 1'; Sinisa Tua 48'	report	Uasi Talanoa 71'; Hemaloto Polovili 87'; Taniela Vaka'uta 90+2'

National Stadium, Apia
Attendance: 100
Referee: Gerald Oiaka (Solomon Islands)

== Goalscorers ==
4 goals

- (American Samoa) Sinisa Tua
- (Tonga) Hemaloto Polovili

3 goals

- (Samoa) Paulo Scanlan

2 goals

- (American Samoa) Kaleopa Siligi
- (Samoa) Filisi Keni
- (Cook Islands) Maro Bonsu-Maro

1 goal

- (Cook Islands) Pekay Edwards
- (Cook Islands) Sunai Joseph
- (Cook Islands) Wiremu Temata
- (Cook Islands) Morgan Wichman
- (Cook Islands) Takuina Tararo
- (Cook Islands) Dwayne Tiputoa
- (Samoa) Sue Pelesa
- (American Samoa) Paia Ipiniu
- (Tonga) Uasi Talanoa
- (Tonga) Taniela Vaka'uta

Player of the tournament	Best goalkeeper	Top scorer	Fairplay Award
(American Samoa) Kaleopa Siligi	(Cook Islands) Keegan Inia	(Tonga) Hemaloto Polovili, (American Samoa) Sinisa Tua (4 goals)	Tonga

== Final round ==
The draw for the final round of competition was held at the Headquarters of the Oceania Football Confederation on 13 February 2013. The teams will play each other once in a round robin tournament based on a league system, with the winner qualifying for the FIFA U-17 World Cup

Team	Pld	W	D	L	GF	GA	GD	Pts
New Zealand	5	5	0	0	23	3	+20	15
New Caledonia	5	3	0	2	10	7	+3	9
Vanuatu	5	2	2	1	9	6	+3	8
Fiji	5	2	1	2	10	8	+2	7
Papua New Guinea	5	1	1	3	2	8	−6	4
Cook Islands	5	0	0	5	1	23	−22	0

All times are local time (UTC+11:00)

=== Matchday 1 ===
17 April 2013
09:30

New Zealand	9–0	Cook Islands
Ford Henry 5' (o.g.); Monty Patterson 9', 21', 31'; Stuart Holthusen 23', 33'; Alex Rufer 43'; Meysum Shafahi 82', 91'	report

Chapuis stadium, Luganville
Attendance: 2,500
Referee: Isidore Assiene-Ambassa (New Caledonia)

17 April 2013
12:30

Fiji	0–3	New Caledonia
	report	Valentin Nykeine 18', 30'; Anthony Kaï 35'

Chapuis stadium, Luganville
Attendance: 3,500
Referee: Nelson Sogo (Solomon Islands)

17 April 2013
15:30

Papua New Guinea	1–1	Vanuatu
Nicky Benjamin 69'	report	Jaison Thomas 77'

Chapuis stadium, Luganville
Attendance: 4,800
Referee: Ravitesh Behari (Fiji)

=== Matchday 2 ===
19 April 2013
09:30

Cook Islands	0–1	Papua New Guinea
	report	Steven Inia 56'

Chapuis stadium, Luganville
Attendance: 1,500
Referee: John Saohu (Solomon Islands)

19 April 2013
12:30

Vanuatu	1–1	Fiji
Remy Kalsrap 82'	report	Iosefo Verevou 49'

Chapuis stadium, Luganville
Attendance: 5,000
Referee: Averii Jacques (Tahiti)

19 April 2013
15:30

New Caledonia	0–4	New Zealand
	report	Elijah Neblett 11'; Alex Rufer 46', 70'; Monty Patterson 77'

Chapuis stadium, Luganville
Attendance: 6,500
Referee: Albert Maru (Papua New Guinea)

=== Matchday 3 ===
21 April 2013
09:30

Fiji	2–0	Papua New Guinea
Jonetani Buksh 21'; Iosefo Verevou 49'	report

Chapuis stadium, Luganville
Attendance: 1,500
Referee: Bruce George (Vanuatu)

21 April 2013
12:30

New Caledonia	5–0	Cook Islands
Ben Wamowe 34'; Macinou Wamai 42', 45'; Raymond Xanatre 46'; Jim Ouka 81' (pen.)	report

Chapuis stadium, Luganville
Attendance: 5,000
Referee: Ravitesh Behari (Fiji)

21 April 2013
15:30

Vanuatu	1–2	New Zealand
Alex Saniel 22'	report	Stuart Holthusen 19'; Elijah Neblett 79'

Chapuis stadium, Luganville
Attendance: 6,750
Referee: John Saohu (Solomon Islands)

=== Matchday 4 ===
23 April 2013
09:30

Cook Islands	1–3	Vanuatu
Morgan Wichman 87'	report	Alex Saniel 14'; Ruben Frank 34'; Etienne Naeiu 58'

Chapuis stadium, Luganville
Attendance: 1,000
Referee: Albert Maru (Papua New Guinea)

23 April 2013
12:30

Papua New Guinea	0–1	New Caledonia
	report	Valentin Nykeine 32'

Chapuis stadium, Luganville
Attendance: 3,000
Referee: Nelson Sogo (Solomon Islands)

23 April 2013
15:30

New Zealand	4–2	Fiji
Elijah Neblett 17'; Andre de Jong 70'; Monty Patterson 73' (pen.); Andrew Blake 85'	report	Ravnit Chand 54'; Iosefo Verevou 90+3' (pen.)

Chapuis stadium, Luganville
Attendance: 5,000
Referee: Isidore Assiene-Ambassa (New Caledonia)

=== Matchday 5 ===
25 April 2013
09:30

New Zealand	4–0	Papua New Guinea
Stuart Holthusen 57', 60', 82'; Monty Patterson 73'	Report

Chapuis stadium, Luganville
Attendance: 2,500
Referee: John Saohu (Solomon Islands)

25 April 2013
12:30

Cook Islands	0–5	Fiji
	Report	Jonetani Buksh 29'; Iosefo Verevou 52', 82'; Suliano Tawananakoro 58'; Shalvin Sharma 89'

Chapuis stadium, Luganville
Attendance: 5,000
Referee: Nelson Sogo (Solomon Islands)

25 April 2013
15:30

New Caledonia	1–3	Vanuatu
Jim Ouka 74'	Report	Ruben Frank 22'; Justin Koka 50'; Jaison Thomas 58'

Chapuis stadium, Luganville
Attendance: 6,500
Referee: Averii Jacques (Tahiti)
