= OFC U-16 Men's Championship =

OFC Men's U-16 Championship
- Organiser(s): OFC
- Founded: 1983
- Region: Oceania
- Teams: 11
- Current champions: New Zealand (12th title)
- Most championships: New Zealand (12 titles)
- 2026 OFC U-16 Men's Championship

The OFC Men's U-16 Championship is a biennial football tournament for players under the age of 16. The tournament decides the only two qualification spots for the Oceania Football Confederation (OFC) and its representatives at the FIFA U-17 World Cup, which is held every two years.

Between 1983 and 2017, the tournament was open to teams under-17 years of age and was called the OFC U-17 Championship. Since 2018, the age limit was reduced to under 16 years of age, the tournament is called the OFC U-16 Championship.

== Eligible teams ==
All member nations of the Oceania Football Confederation are allowed to enter a team. Teams that have participated in the tournament are:

- American Samoa
- Cook Islands
- Fiji
- New Caledonia
- New Zealand
- Papua New Guinea
- Samoa
- Solomon Islands
- Tahiti
- Tonga
- Vanuatu
- Australia (member of AFC since 2007)
- Chinese Taipei (member of AFC since 1989)

== Results ==
=== Summaries ===
The list of winners:

Ed.	Year	Hosts	Winners	Score	Runners-up	Third place	Score	Fourth place
1	1983	New Zealand	Australia	– (Note: Group stage, defined on points earned.)	New Zealand	Chinese Taipei	–	New Caledonia
2	1986	Taiwan	Australia	–	New Zealand	Chinese Taipei	–	Papua New Guinea
3	1989	Australia	Australia	–	New Zealand	Chinese Taipei	–	Fiji
4	1991	New Zealand	Australia	–	New Zealand	Fiji	—N/a	
5	1993	Solomon Islands	Australia	3–0	Solomon Islands	New Zealand	5–1	Fiji
6	1995	Vanuatu	Australia	1–0	New Zealand	Vanuatu	3–0	Solomon Islands
7	1997	New Zealand	New Zealand	1–0	Australia	Solomon Islands	3–0	Fiji
8	1999	Fiji	Australia	5–0	Fiji	Solomon Islands	beat	New Caledonia
9	2001	Samoa & Vanuatu	Australia	9–0 (Note: Aggregate score. (3–0 first leg; 6–0 second leg))	New Zealand	– (Note: There was no dispute for third place.)		
10	2003	American Samoa, Australia & New Caledonia	Australia	7–1 (Note: Aggregate score. (3–1 first leg; 4–0 second leg))	New Caledonia	–		
11	2005	New Caledonia	Australia	1–0	Vanuatu	Solomon Islands	3–1	New Caledonia
12	2007	Tahiti	New Zealand	–	Tahiti	Fiji	–	New Caledonia
13	2009	New Zealand	New Zealand	–	Tahiti	New Caledonia	–	Vanuatu
14	2011	New Zealand	New Zealand	2–0	Tahiti	Solomon Islands	2–0	Vanuatu
15	2013	Vanuatu	New Zealand	–	New Caledonia	Vanuatu	–	Fiji
16	2015	American Samoa & Samoa	New Zealand	1–1 (5–4 p)	Tahiti	Vanuatu	6–0	New Caledonia
17	2017	Tahiti	New Zealand	7–0	New Caledonia	Solomon Islands and Papua New Guinea		
18	2018	Solomon Islands (Note: The Solomon Islands, which originally finished second in the 2018 OFC U-16 Championship, were found to have deliberately fielded overage player Chris Satu during the tournament. As a result, they had forfeited all results and their place in the 2019 FIFA U-17 World Cup. The decision was appealed by the Solomon Islands Football Federation, and the OFC decided to uphold the appeal on the grounds that the federation had not knowingly broken the rules as Satu had a government issued passport showing his eligibility.)	New Zealand	0–0 (5–4 p)	Solomon Islands	Tahiti	2–1	Fiji
19	2023	Fiji	New Zealand	1–0	New Caledonia	Tahiti	3–0	Fiji
20	2024	Tahiti	New Zealand	3–1	Fiji	New Caledonia	1–1 (5–4 p)	Tahiti
21	2025	Solomon Islands	New Zealand	2–0	New Caledonia	Fiji	1–0	Papua New Guinea
22	2026	Papua New Guinea	New Zealand	5–0	Fiji	Solomon Islands	1–1 (4–1 p)	Papua New Guinea

== Performances by country ==
Team	Titles	Runners-up	Third place	Fourth place
New Zealand	12 (1997, 2007, 2009, 2011, 2013, 2015, 2017, 2018, 2023, 2024, 2025, 2026)	6 (1983, 1986, 1989, 1991, 1995, 2001)	1 (1993)	—
Australia	10 (1983, 1986, 1989, 1991, 1993, 1995, 1999, 2001, 2003, 2005)	1 (1997)	—	—
New Caledonia	—	5 (2003, 2013, 2017, 2023, 2025)	2 (2009, 2024)	5 (1983, 1999, 2005, 2007, 2015)
Tahiti	—	4 (2007, 2009, 2011, 2015)	2 (2018, 2023)	1 (2024)
Fiji	—	3 (1999, 2024, 2026)	3 (1991, 2007, 2025)	6 (1989, 1993, 1997, 2013, 2018, 2023)
Solomon Islands	—	2 (1993, 2018)	5 (1997, 1999, 2005, 2011, 2026)	1 (1995)
Vanuatu	—	1 (2005)	3 (1995, 2013, 2015)	2 (2009, 2011)
Chinese Taipei	—	—	3 (1983, 1986, 1989)	—
Papua New Guinea	—	—	—	3 (1986, 2025, 2026)

* = As hosts

Note: no third or fourth place finishes in 1991 (no fourth place finish only), 2001, 2003 and 2017.

== Participating nations ==
Legend

- 1st – Champions
- 2nd – Runners-up
- 3rd – Third place
- 4th – Fourth place
- SF – Semi-finalists
- GS – Group stage
- PR – Preliminary Round
- × – Did not participate
- × – Withdrew
- – Hosts
- – Not affiliated to OFC
- Q – Qualified for upcoming tournament

Team	(New Zealand) 1983	(Taiwan) 1986	(Australia) 1989	(New Zealand) 1991	(Solomon Islands) 1993	(Vanuatu) 1995	(New Zealand) 1997	(Fiji) 1999	(Samoa) (Vanuatu) 2001	(American Samoa) (Australia) (New Caledonia) 2003	(New Caledonia) 2005	(French Polynesia) 2007	(New Zealand) 2009	(New Zealand) 2011	(Samoa) (Vanuatu) 2013	(American Samoa) (Samoa) 2015	(Samoa) (French Polynesia) 2017	(Tonga) (Solomon Islands) 2018	(Fiji) 2023	(Tonga) (French Polynesia) 2024	(Tonga) (Solomon Islands) 2025	(Tonga) (Papua New Guinea) 2026	Total
American Samoa	×	×	×	×	×	×	×	GS	GS	GS	×	×	×	GS	PR	GS	PR	PR	GS	PR	PR	PR	12
Australia	1st	1st	1st	1st	1st	1st	2nd	1st	1st	1st	1st	AFC member											11
Chinese Taipei	3rd	3rd	3rd	AFC member																			3
Cook Islands	×	×	×	×	×	×	GS	GS	×	GS	GS	×	×	GS	GS	GS	PR	PR	QF	GS	GS	PR	13
Fiji	GS	GS	4th	3rd	4th	GS	4th	2nd	GS	GS	GS	3rd	×	GS	4th	GS	GS	4th	4th	2nd	3rd	2nd	21
New Caledonia	4th	×	×	×	×	×	×	4th	×	2nd	4th	4th	3rd	GS	2nd	4th	2nd	GS	2nd	3rd	2nd	GS	15
New Zealand	2nd	2nd	2nd	2nd	3rd	2nd	1st	×	2nd	GS	×	1st	1st	1st	1st	1st	1st	1st	1st	1st	1st	1st	20
Papua New Guinea	×	4th	×	×	×	×	×	GS	GS	×	GS	×	×	GS	GS	GS	SF	GS	×	PR	4th	4th	12
Samoa	×	×	×	×	×	×	GS	GS	GS	GS	×	×	×	×	PR	GS	GS	GS	QF	GS	GS	GS	12
Solomon Islands	×	×	×	×	2nd	4th	3rd	3rd	GS	GS	3rd	×	×	3rd	×	GS	SF	2nd	×	GS	GS	3rd	14
Tahiti	GS	×	×	×	GS	×	GS	GS	GS	GS	GS	2nd	2nd	2nd	×	2nd	GS	3rd	3rd	4th	GS	GS	17
Tonga	×	×	×	×	×	×	×	GS	GS	GS	GS	×	×	GS	PR	GS	PR	PR	QF	PR	PR	PR	13
Vanuatu	×	×	GS	×	GS	3rd	GS	GS	GS	GS	2nd	×	4th	4th	3rd	3rd	GS	GS	QF	GS	PR	GS	18

== Men's U-17 World Cup Qualifiers ==
Legend

- 1st – Champions
- 2nd – Runners-up
- 3rd – Third place
- 4th – Fourth place
- QF – Quarterfinals
- R2 – Round 2
- R1 – Round 1
- – Hosts
- – Not affiliated to OFC
- Q – Qualified for upcoming tournament

Team	(China) 1985	(Canada) 1987	(Scotland) 1989	(Italy) 1991	(Japan) 1993	(Ecuador) 1995	(Egypt) 1997	(New Zealand) 1999	(Trinidad and Tobago) 2001	(Finland) 2003	(Peru) 2005	(South Korea) 2007	(Nigeria) 2009	(Mexico) 2011	(United Arab Emirates) 2013	(Chile) 2015	(India) 2017	(Brazil) 2019	(Indonesia) 2023	(Qatar) 2025	(Qatar) 2026	(Qatar) 2027	Total
Australia	QF	QF	R1	QF	QF	QF		2nd	QF	R1	R1	AFC member											10
Fiji																				R1	Q	Q	3
New Caledonia																	R1		R1	R1	Q		4
New Zealand							R1	R1				R1	R2	R2	R1	R2	R1	R1	R1	R1	Q	Q	13
Solomon Islands																		R1				Q	2

== Awards ==
=== Best player ===
Edition	Player
2015	(New Zealand) Logan Rogerson
2017	(New Zealand) Charles Spragg
2018	(Solomon Islands) Raphael Lea'i
2023	(New Caledonia) Nolhann Alabete
2024	(New Zealand) Aaron Cartwright
2025	(New Zealand) Ethan Dyer

=== Best goalkeeper ===
Edition	Player
2015	(French Polynesia) Vaiarii Halligan
2017	(New Zealand) Zac Jones
2018	(New Zealand) Alex Paulsen
2023	(New Zealand) Matt Foord
2024	(New Caledonia) Nicolas Kutran
2025	(New Caledonia) Sylvain Ipeze

=== Top scorers ===
Edition	Player	Goals
2007	(New Zealand) Kosta Barbarouses	5
2009	(New Zealand) Andrew Milne (French Polynesia) Heirarii Tevenae	3
2011	(New Caledonia) Renaldo Nonmeu	8
2013	(New Zealand) Stuart Holthusen (New Zealand) Monty Patterson	6
2015	(Solomon Islands) Larry Zama	13
2017	(New Zealand) Charles Spragg	7
2018	(Solomon Islands) Raphael Lea'i	8
2023	(New Zealand) Luke Supyk (French Polynesia) Titouan Guillemant	6
2024	(New Zealand) Aaron Cartwright	7
2025	(New Zealand) Ben Perez Baldoni	6
