= 2001 OFC U-17 Championship =

2001 OFC Under-17 Championship
Tournament details
- Host country: Samoa; Vanuatu
- Dates: 3 December 2000 – 8 April 2001
- Teams: 10
- Venue: 4 (in 4 host cities)

Final positions
- Champions: Australia (8th title)
- Runners-up: New Zealand

Tournament statistics
- Matches played: 21
- Goals scored: 131 (6.24 per match)

The 2001 OFC U-17 Championship was the 9th edition of the OFC U-17 Championship, the biennial international youth football championship organised by OFC for the men's under-17 national teams of Oceania. Vanuatu and Samoa each hosted one group in the group stage, while the final was played over two legs in the qualifying countries: Australia and New Zealand.

A total of ten teams played in the tournament, following the withdrawals of Cook Islands and New Caledonia. Defending champions Australia retained their title after defeating New Zealand 9–0 on aggregate in the final.

== Group stage ==
=== Group 1 ===
Pos	Team	Pld	W	D	L	GF	GA	GD	Pts	Qualification
1	Australia	4	4	0	0	43	0	+43	12	Final
2	Papua New Guinea	4	3	0	1	11	9	+2	9	
3	Solomon Islands	4	2	0	2	20	3	+17	6	
4	Western Samoa (H)	4	1	0	3	5	17	−12	3	
5	American Samoa	4	0	0	4	3	53	−50	0	
6	New Caledonia	0	0	0	0	0	0	0	0	Withdrew

(H) Hosts
3 December 2000

Western Samoa	4–3	American Samoa

Apia
3 December 2000

Papua New Guinea	2–1	Solomon Islands

Apia

5 December 2000

Australia	30–0	American Samoa
Sean Walsh 5', 28', 50'; Ben Stevens 7', 41', 48'; Terry Smith 12', 32', 52', 61', 64', 81', 84', 87'; Fred Agius 22', 26', 35', 56', 59', 73'; Jay Lucas 43', 54', 69', 71'; own goal 58'; Brett Studman 62'; Carl Valeri 65'; Mario Karlovic 75'; Michael Brown 76'; Predrag Bojic 85'

Apia
5 December 2000

Western Samoa	1–2	Papua New Guinea

Apia

7 December 2000

Australia	7–0	Papua New Guinea

Apia
7 December 2000

Western Samoa	0–7	Solomon Islands

Apia

9 December 2000

Australia	1–0	Solomon Islands

Apia
9 December 2000

Papua New Guinea	7–0	American Samoa

Apia

11 December 2000

Western Samoa	0–5	Australia

Apia
11 December 2000

Solomon Islands	12–0	American Samoa

Apia

=== Group 2 ===
Pos	Team	Pld	W	D	L	GF	GA	GD	Pts	Qualification
1	New Zealand	4	4	0	0	14	1	+13	12	Final
2	Vanuatu (H)	4	2	1	1	16	3	+13	7	
3	Tahiti	4	1	2	1	1	2	−1	5	
4	Fiji	4	1	0	3	9	5	+4	3	
5	Tonga	4	0	1	3	0	29	−29	1	
6	Cook Islands	0	0	0	0	0	0	0	0	Withdrew

(H) Hosts
22 March 2001

Tahiti	0–0	Vanuatu

Port Vila
22 March 2001

Fiji	0–1	New Zealand

Port Vila

24 March 2001

Vanuatu	3–0	Fiji

Port Vila
24 March 2001

New Zealand	8–0	Tonga

Port Vila

26 March 2001

Tonga	0–12	Vanuatu

Port Vila
26 March 2001

Tahiti	1–0	Fiji

Port Vila

28 March 2001

New Zealand	2–0	Tahiti

Port Vila
28 March 2001

Tonga	0–9	Fiji

Port Vila

30 March 2001

Tahiti	Not played (awarded 0–0)	Tonga

Port Vila
30 March 2001

Vanuatu	1–3	New Zealand

Port Vila

== Final ==
=== First leg ===
4 April 2001

Australia	3–0	New Zealand
Holman 47'; Agius 66', 90+2'	Report

West Belconnen Sports Ground, Canberra
Attendance: 1,400
Referee: Harry Attison (Vanuatu)

=== Second leg ===
8 April 2001

New Zealand	0–6	Australia
	Report	Howe 14' (o.g.); Danze 39'; Engele 56', 78'; Hunter 70'; Smith 74'

Bill McKinlay Park, Auckland
Attendance: 2,000
Referee: Lencie Fred (Vanuatu)
