= 1983 OFC U-17 Championship =

Tournament details
- Host country: New Zealand
- City: Mount Smart Stadium and Epsom Showgrounds Auckland
- Dates: 3–10 December 1983
- Teams: 6 (from 2 confederations)
- Venue: 2 (in 1 host city)

Final positions
- Champions: Australia (1st title)
- Runners-up: New Zealand
- Third place: Chinese Taipei
- Fourth place: New Caledonia

Tournament statistics
- Matches played: 15
- Goals scored: 55 (3.67 per match)

The 1983 OFC U-17 Championship, was the OFC Under 17 Qualifying Tournament, the biennial football championship of Oceania (OFC). It was the 1st edition of the tournament and was held in Auckland, New Zealand from 3 to 10 December 1983. New Zealand qualified for the 1985 FIFA U-16 World Championship, in China.

== Teams ==
1. Australia 2. New Zealand 3. Chinese Taipei 4. New Caledonia 5. Fiji 6. Tahiti

== Results ==
Pos	Team	Pld	W	D	L	GF	GA	GD	Pts	Qualification
1	Australia	5	5	0	0	22	2	+20	10	Qualification for 1985 FIFA U-16 World Championship
2	New Zealand (H)	5	3	1	1	7	2	+5	7	
3	Chinese Taipei	5	2	1	2	11	4	+7	5	
4	New Caledonia	5	2	0	3	6	12	−6	4	
5	Fiji	5	0	2	3	6	18	−12	2	
6	Tahiti	5	0	2	3	3	17	−14	2	

Source: RSSSF
(H) Hosts

== Matches ==
(order of matches unknown)

Australia 2–1 New Zealand
Australia 3–0 Chinese Taipei
Australia 4–0 New Caledonia
Australia 4–1 Fiji
Australia 9–0 Tahiti
New Zealand 1–0 Chinese Taipei
New Zealand 1–0 New Caledonia
New Zealand 0–0 Fiji
New Zealand 4–0 Tahiti
Chinese Taipei 3–0 New Caledonia
Chinese Taipei 8–0 Fiji
Chinese Taipei 0–0 Tahiti
New Caledonia 4–3 Fiji
New Caledonia 2–1 Tahiti
Fiji 2–2 Tahiti
