= 1989 OFC U-17 Championship =

Tournament details
- Host country: Australia
- Dates: 21–29 January 1989
- Teams: 5 (from 5 associations)
- Venue: 1

Final positions
- Champions: Australia (3rd title)
- Runners-up: New Zealand
- Third place: Chinese Taipei
- Fourth place: Fiji

Tournament statistics
- Matches played: 10
- Goals scored: 85 (8.5 per match)

The 1989 OFC U-17 Championship was the third edition of the OFC U-16/U-17 Championship, the international youth football championship organised by OFC for the men's under-17 national teams of Oceania. This doubled as the qualifiers for the 1989 FIFA U-16 World Championship.

Australia were the defending champions, and won their third title by two points over New Zealand and subsequently qualified for the 1989 FIFA U-16 World Championship.

== Teams ==
Five teams entered the tournament from five confederations.

- Australia (hosts)
- Chinese Taipei
- Fiji
- New Zealand
- Vanuatu

== Standings ==
Pos	Team	Pld	W	D	L	GF	GA	GD	Pts	Qualification
1	Australia (H)	4	4	0	0	35	1	+34	8	Qualification for 1989 FIFA U-16 World Championship
2	New Zealand	4	3	0	1	18	5	+13	6	
3	Chinese Taipei	4	2	0	2	23	5	+18	4	
4	Fiji	4	1	0	3	9	23	−14	2	
5	Vanuatu	4	0	0	4	0	51	−51	0	

Source: RSSSF
(H) Hosts

== Matches ==
21 January 1989

Australia	2–0	Chinese Taipei
	Report

21 January 1989

New Zealand	9–0	Fiji
	Report

24 January 1989

Fiji	2–10	Chinese Taipei
	Report

24 January 1989

Australia	24–0	Vanuatu
	Report

25 January 1989

Australia	4–0	Fiji
	Report

25 January 1989

Vanuatu	0–7	New Zealand
	Report

27 January 1989

New Zealand	1–0	Chinese Taipei
	Report

27 January 1989

Fiji	7–0	Vanuatu
	Report

29 January 1989

Vanuatu	0–13	Chinese Taipei
	Report

29 January 1989

Australia	5–1	New Zealand
	Report
