= 2026 OFC U-16 Men's Championship =

Tournament details
- Host country: Papua New Guinea
- City: Port Moresby
- Dates: 12 – 25 July
- Teams: 8 (from 1 confederation)

The 2026 OFC U-16 Men's Championship was the 23rd edition of the OFC U-16 Men's Championship, the international youth football championship organized by the Oceania Football Confederation (OFC) for the men's under-16 national teams. The final tournament was played in Port Moresby, Papua New Guinea, from 12 to 25 July.

The top three teams of the tournament qualified for the 2027 FIFA U-17 World Cup in Qatar as the OFC representatives.

== Background ==
Papua New Guinea was selected as the host nation in May 2025. It will be one of fifteen international tournaments hosted by OFC in 2026. The draw for the group stage was held on 18 February 2026.

== Teams ==
All 11 FIFA-affiliated national teams from the OFC entered the tournament, but only 8 played in the final tournament

Note: All appearance statistics include those in the qualifying stage (2016 and 2018).

| Team | App. | Previous best performance |
|---|---|---|
| American Samoa | 12th | Group stage (1999, 2001, 2003, 2011, 2015, 2023) |
| Cook Islands | 13th | Eighth place (2025) |
| Fiji | 21st | Runners-up (1999, 2024) |
| New Caledonia | 15th | Runners-up (2003, 2013, 2017, 2023, 2025) |
| New Zealand | 20th | Champions (1997, 2007, 2009, 2011, 2013, 2015, 2017, 2018, 2023, 2024, 2025) |
| Papua New Guinea (hosts) | 12th | Semi-finals (2017), Fourth place (1986, 2025) |
| Samoa | 12th | Quarter-finals (2023) |
| Solomon Islands | 12th | Runners-up (1993, 2018) |
| Tahiti | 16th | Runners-up (2007, 2009, 2011, 2015) |
| Tonga | 13th | Quarter-finals (2023) |
| Vanuatu | 18th | Runners-up (2005) |

== Venues ==
| Tonga | Papua New Guinea | |
| ‘Atele | Port Moresby | |
|---|---|---|
| Loto-Tonga Soka Centre | PNG Football Stadium | Sir Hubert Murray Stadium |
| Capacity: 500 | Capacity: 14,800 | Capacity: 20,000 |
| 2026 OFC U-16 Men's Championship is located in Tonga | Port Moresby is located in Papua New Guinea | |

== Qualifying stage ==
A qualification round will be held from 25 to 31 March 2026 in Nukuʻalofa, Tonga.

=== Standings ===
| Pos | Team | Pld | W | D | L | GF | GA | GD | Pts | Qualification |
|---|---|---|---|---|---|---|---|---|---|---|
| 1 | Vanuatu | 3 | 3 | 0 | 0 | 29 | 2 | +27 | 9 | Qualify for Final tournament |
| 2 | Cook Islands | 3 | 2 | 0 | 1 | 7 | 3 | +4 | 6 | |
| 3 | Tonga (H) | 3 | 1 | 0 | 2 | 6 | 9 | −3 | 3 | |
| 4 | American Samoa | 3 | 0 | 0 | 3 | 1 | 29 | −28 | 0 | |

Source: OFC
(H) Hosts
25 March 2026
11:00

| Cook Islands | 4–0 | American Samoa |
|---|---|---|
| Angene 24'; Nand 31'; Denny 45+1'; Samania 64' | Report |

Loto-Tonga Soka Centre, ‘Atele, Tonga
Attendance: 50
Referee: Caleb Downes (New Zealand)
25 March 2026
15:00

| Tonga | 1–6 | Vanuatu |
|---|---|---|
| Kautai 25' | Report | Masauvakalo 6' (pen.), 38'; Leao 18' (o.g.); Tevunga 47' (o.g.); Shem 50'; Tawia 67' |

Loto-Tonga Soka Centre, ‘Atele, Tonga
Attendance: 250
Referee: Ruben Wajoka (Tahiti)

28 March 2026
11:00

| Vanuatu | 20–0 | American Samoa |
|---|---|---|
| Shem 2', 45+3', 53'; Robert 3', 15', 35', 52'; Masauvakalo 9', 10', 21', 43', 44', 45+4'; Mulipola 24' (o.g.); Kaluat 28'; Vuti 49', 57'; Vanuaroro 72'; Ne'emia 80' (o.g.); Naviti 83' | Report |

Loto-Tonga Soka Centre, ‘Atele, Tonga
Attendance: 100
Referee: Lafi Ioane (Samoa)
28 March 2026
15:00

| Cook Islands | 2–0 | Tonga |
|---|---|---|
| Williams 16'; Denny 19' | Report |

Loto-Tonga Soka Centre, ‘Atele, Tonga
Attendance: 250
Referee: Avikanshay Nand (Fiji)

31 March 2026
11:00

| Vanuatu | 3–1 | Cook Islands |
|---|---|---|
| Shem 45', 90+2'; Robert 80' | Report | Williams 37' |

Loto-Tonga Soka Centre, ‘Atele, Tonga
Attendance: 100
Referee: Caleb Downes (New Zealand)
31 March 2026
15:00

| American Samoa | 1–5 | Tonga |
|---|---|---|
| Maifala 43' | Report | Matakaiongo 26', 36', 47'; Tupou 28'; Fiu 88' |

Loto-Tonga Soka Centre, ‘Atele, Tonga
Attendance: 250
Referee: Lafi Ioane (Samoa)

== Group stage ==
=== Group A ===
| Pos | Team | Pld | W | D | L | GF | GA | GD | Pts | Qualification |
|---|---|---|---|---|---|---|---|---|---|---|
| 1 | Fiji | 3 | 3 | 0 | 0 | 10 | 0 | +10 | 9 | Knockout stage |
| 2 | Papua New Guinea (H) | 3 | 2 | 0 | 1 | 5 | 3 | +2 | 6 | Knockout stage |
| 3 | New Caledonia | 3 | 0 | 1 | 2 | 1 | 4 | −3 | 1 | 5th place match |
| 4 | Samoa | 3 | 0 | 1 | 2 | 1 | 10 | −9 | 1 | 7th place match |

First match(es) will be played: 1 September 2026. Source: OFC
(H) Hosts
12 July 2026

| New Caledonia | 0–2 | Fiji |
|---|---|---|
| | Report | Shah 13'; Baselala 16' |

12 July 2026

| Papua New Guinea | 4–0 | Samoa |
|---|---|---|
| Eron 14'; Goro 16'; Tommy 61'; Steven 80' | [Report] |

15 July 2026
16:00

| Samoa | 0–5 | Fiji |
|---|---|---|
| | [Report] | Prasad 19'; Swami 26'; Baselala 43', 62'; Fatu Fasi 80' (o.g.) |

15 July 2026
19:00

| New Caledonia | 0–1 | Papua New Guinea |
|---|---|---|
| | [Report] | Steven 73' |

18 July 2026
16:00

| Fiji | 3–0 | Papua New Guinea |
|---|---|---|
| Shah 6'; Levea 29'; Baselala 43' | [Report] |

18 July 2026
19:00

| Samoa | 1–1 | New Caledonia |
|---|---|---|
| Schick 30' | [Report] | Andrew 74' |

=== Group B ===
| Pos | Team | Pld | W | D | L | GF | GA | GD | Pts | Qualification |
|---|---|---|---|---|---|---|---|---|---|---|
| 1 | New Zealand | 3 | 3 | 0 | 0 | 18 | 2 | +16 | 9 | Knockout stage |
| 2 | Solomon Islands | 3 | 2 | 0 | 1 | 6 | 7 | −1 | 6 | Knockout stage |
| 3 | Tahiti | 3 | 1 | 0 | 2 | 6 | 11 | −5 | 3 | 5th place match |
| 4 | Vanuatu | 3 | 0 | 0 | 3 | 3 | 13 | −10 | 0 | 7th place match |

First match(es) will be played: 2 September 2026. Source: OFC
13 July 2026

| Tahiti | 4–2 | Vanuatu |
|---|---|---|
| Jamet 51', 60'; Covic 54', 86' | [Report] | Masauvakalo 43'; Shem 77' |

13 July 2026

| New Zealand | 5–1 | Solomon Islands |
|---|---|---|
| Sang 38', 79'; Clegg 48', 77'; Trenberth 69' | [Report] | Hovoa 59' |

16 July 2026
10:00

| Vanuatu | 1–2 | Solomon Islands |
|---|---|---|
| Allaleo 30' | [Report] | Gau 35'; Lea'i 75' |

16 July 2026
16:00

| New Zealand | 6–1 | Tahiti |
|---|---|---|
| Clegg 10'; Skinner 13'; Trenberth 50'; Cashmore 65', 88'; Bancroft 84' | [Report] | Jamet 80' |

19 July 2026
10:00

| Solomon Islands | 3–1 | Tahiti |
|---|---|---|
| Lea'i 26'; Makarani 48'; Gau 90' | [Report] | Jamet 53' |

19 July 2026
16:00

| Vanuatu | 0–7 | New Zealand |
|---|---|---|
| | [Report] | Cashmore 5', 10', 15', 31'; Amyes 39'; Trenberth 70'; Santos 72' |

== 5th place match ==
23 July 2026
16:00

| New Caledonia | 2–3 | Tahiti |
|---|---|---|
| Bessières 45+1'; Hoang 72' | [Report] | Jamet 12', 51', 71' |

== 7th place match ==
23 July 2026
10:00

| Samoa | 1–7 | Vanuatu |
|---|---|---|
| Schick 45' | [Report] | Masauvakalo 3', 27', 43', 49'; Tawia 31'; Shem 6', 51' |

== Knockout stage ==
=== Bracket ===
Semi-finals
22 July 2026 – Port Moresby
Fiji | 0 (4)
Solomon Islands | 0 (2)
22 July 2026 – Port Moresby
New Zealand | 3
Papua New Guinea | 0

Final
25 July 2026 – Port Moresby
Fiji | 0
New Zealand | 5
Third place match
25 July 2026 – Port Moresby
Solomon Islands | 1 (4)
Papua New Guinea | 1 (1)

=== Semi-finals ===
22 July 2026
16:00

| Fiji | 0–0 | Solomon Islands |
|---|---|---|
| | Report |
Penalties
| | 4–2 |

Referee: Caleb Downes (New Zealand)
22 July 2026
19:30

| New Zealand | 3–0 | Papua New Guinea |
|---|---|---|
| Basananuc 50' (o.g.); Pietersen 60', 90' | Report |

Referee: Neeshil Varman (Fiji)

=== Third place match ===
25 July 2026
16:00

| Solomon Islands | 1–1 | Papua New Guinea |
|---|---|---|
| Kabolo 84' | [Report] | Sopo 65' |
Penalties
| | 4–1 |

=== Final ===
25 July 2026
19:30

| Fiji | 0–5 | New Zealand |
|---|---|---|
| | Report | Cashmore 2'; Valle dos Santos 36', 81'; Maharaj 45' (o.g.); Clegg 76' |

PNG Football Stadium, Port Moresby
Attendance: 300
Referee: Peter Olomaga (Samoa)

== Qualified teams for FIFA U-17 World Cup ==
The following three teams from OFC qualified for the 2027 FIFA U-17 World Cup in Qatar.

| Team | Qualified on | Previous appearances^{1} |
|---|---|---|
| Fiji | 22 July 2026 | 2 (2025, 2026) |
| New Zealand | 22 July 2026 | 12 (1997, 1999, 2007, 2009, 2011, 2013, 2015, 2017, 2019, 2023, 2025, 2026) |
| Solomon Islands | 25 July 2026 | 1 (2019) |

^{1} Bold indicates champions for that year. Italic indicates hosts for that year.

== Statistics ==
=== Goalscorers ===
==== Qualifying stage ====
8 goals

- (Vanuatu) Rohan Masauvakalo

6 goals

- (Vanuatu) Franso Shem

5 goals

- (Vanuatu) Titus Robert

3 goals

- (Tonga) Sione Matakaiongo

==== Final tournament ====
| Goals | Player | Team |
|---|---|---|
| 6 | Zach Cashmore Esdras Jamet | New Zealand Tahiti |
| 5 | Rohan Masauvakalo | Vanuatu |
| 4 | Isoa Baselala | Fiji |
| 3 | Jack Clegg Ben Trenberth; Franso Shem | New Zealand New Zealand; Vanuatu |
| 2 | George Lea'i Gregy Gau; Zaman Shah; Santiago Covic; Reuben Lee Sang; Ryan Swami; Cruz Pietersen; Nelson Tawia | Solomon Islands Solomon Islands; Fiji; Tahiti; New Zealand; Fiji; New Zealand; Vanuatu |
| 1 | Shahil Prasad Jerry Levea; Jaru Eron; Toka Goro; Boas Tommy; Te Koha Gabriel Schick; Iga Steven; Vaulton Hovoa; Russle Allaleo; Jackson Skinner; Tristan Bancroft; Jayer Makarani; Ethan Amyes; Davi Valle dos Santos; Kevin Hoang; Lisandro Bessières | Fiji Papua New Guinea; Papua New Guinea; Papua New Guinea; Papua New Guinea; Samoa; Papua New Guinea; Solomon Islands; Vanuatu; New Zealand; New Zealand; Solomon Islands; New Zealand; New Zealand; New Caledonia; New Caledonia |

=== Own goals ===
| Player | Team | Opponent |
|---|---|---|
| Fatu Fasi | Fiji | Samoa |
| Basananuc | Papua New Guinea | New Zealand |

== Awards ==
=== Individual Awards ===
| Award | Player | Team |
|---|---|---|
| Golden Boot | | |
| Golden Ball | | |
| Golden Glove | | |

=== Team Awards ===
| Award | Team |
|---|---|
| Champion | |
| Fair Play Award | |

== Broadcasting ==
All matches are broadcast live on the Oceania Football Confederation's official YouTube Channel.
