= 2024 OFC U-16 Men's Championship =

Tournament details
- Host countries: Qualifying stage: Tonga; Final tournament: Tahiti
- Dates: Qualifying stage: 13–19 April 2024; Final tournament: 28 July – 10 August 2024
- Teams: Final tournament: 8 Total: 11 (from 1 confederation)
- Venue: 2 (in 1 host city)

Final positions
- Champions: New Zealand (10th title)
- Runners-up: Fiji
- Third place: New Caledonia
- Fourth place: Tahiti

Tournament statistics
- Matches played: 18
- Goals scored: 77 (4.28 per match)
- Attendance: 3,500 (194 per match)
- Top scorer: (New Zealand) Aaron Cartwright (7 goals)
- Best player: (New Zealand) Aaron Cartwright
- Best goalkeeper: (New Caledonia) Nicolas Kutran
- Fair play award: Tahiti

The 2024 OFC U-16 Men's Championship was the 21st edition of the OFC U-16/U-17 Championship, the biennial international youth football championship organised by the Oceania Football Confederation (OFC) for the men's under-16/under-17 national teams of Oceania. The final tournament was played in Pirae, Tahiti, from 28 July to 10 August 2024. Players born on or after 1 January 2007 are eligible to compete in the tournament.

The top three teams of the tournament qualified for the 2025 FIFA U-17 World Cup in Qatar as the OFC representatives. New Zealand successfully defended the title from 2023.

== Teams ==
All 11 FIFA-affiliated national teams from the OFC entered the tournament.

In 2022 and 2023, male youth OFC tournaments did not have a four-team qualifying stage, and all teams competed in one tournament. This was reversed for the 2024 tournament.

Note: All appearance statistics include those in the qualifying stage (2016 and 2018).

Team	Appearance	Previous best performance
American Samoa	10th	Group stage (1999, 2001, 2003, 2011, 2015, 2023)
Cook Islands	11th	Quarter-finals (2023)
Fiji	19th	Runners-up (1999)
New Caledonia	13th	Runners-up (2003, 2013, 2017, 2023)
New Zealand	18th	Champions (1997, 2007, 2009, 2011, 2013, 2015, 2017, 2018, 2023)
Papua New Guinea	10th	Semi-finals (2017), Fourth place (1986)
Samoa	10th	Quarter-finals (2023)
Solomon Islands	10th	Runners-up (1993, 2018)
Tahiti (hosts)	15th	Runners-up (2007, 2009, 2011, 2015)
Tonga	11th	Quarter-finals (2023)
Vanuatu	16th	Runners-up (2005)

== Venues ==
2024 OFC U-16 Men's Championship is located in Tahiti
Pirae
Stade Pater	Stade Fautaua
Capacity: 11,700	Capacity: 5,000

== Qualifying stage ==
The draw for the group stage was held 5 March 2024.

=== Tiebreakers ===
Tie-breaking criteria for group play
The ranking of teams in the group stage was determined as follows:
1. Total points;
2. Goal difference in all group matches;
3. Goals scored in all group matches;
4. Head-to-head result between tied teams;
  1. Points in matches among the tied teams;
  2. Goal difference in matches among the tied teams;
  3. Goals scored in matches among the tied teams;
5. Fair play points in all group matches (only one deduction per player, per match):
  - One yellow card: −1 point;
  - Two yellow cards (indirect red card): −3 points;
  - Direct red card: −4 points;
  - Yellow card and direct red card: −5 points;
6. Drawing of lots.

=== Qualifying group ===
Pos	Team	Pld	W	D	L	GF	GA	GD	Pts	Qualification	(Solomon Islands)	(Tonga)	(Papua New Guinea)	(American Samoa)
1	Solomon Islands	3	3	0	0	29	0	+29	9	Qualify for Final tournament	—	—	—	6–0
2	Tonga (H)	3	2	0	1	10	9	+1	6		0–9	—	7–0	—
3	Papua New Guinea	3	1	0	2	3	22	−19	3		0–14	—	—	3–1
4	American Samoa	3	0	0	3	1	12	−11	0		—	0–3	—	—

Source: OFC
(H) Hosts

== Draw ==
The draw for the group stage was held on 5 March with teams seeded into pots based upon their ranking at the 2023 OFC U-17 Championship.

Pot 1	Pot 2	Pot 3
New Caledonia; New Zealand	Fiji; Samoa; Tahiti; Vanuatu	Cook Islands; Solomon Islands (Note: The identity of the qualifying winners was not known at the time of the final draw)

== Group stage ==
All times are local, TAHT (UTC-10).

=== Group A ===
Pos	Team	Pld	W	D	L	GF	GA	GD	Pts	Qualification
1	New Zealand	3	3	0	0	23	1	+22	9	Knockout stage
2	Fiji	3	2	0	1	6	10	−4	6	Knockout stage
3	Cook Islands	3	1	0	2	4	10	−6	3	5th place match
4	Vanuatu	3	0	0	3	3	15	−12	0	7th place match

Source: OFC
28 July 2024
12:00

New Zealand	9–0	Vanuatu
Lienard 20'; Cartwright 29', 66'; Brooke-Smith 42'; Fitzharris 45+1', 76'; Martin 58'; Britton 78'; Smith 86'	Report

Stade Fautaua, Pirae
Attendance: 100
Referee: Shama Maemae (Solomon Islands)
28 July 2024
15:00

Fiji	2–1	Cook Islands
Shankar 58', 90+6'	Report	Rasmussen 12'

Stade Fautaua, Pirae
Attendance: 100
Referee: Peter Olomaga (Samoa)

31 July 2024
12:00

New Zealand	7–1	Fiji
Cartwright 27', 50'; Cardozo 35'; Brooke-Smith 43', 45', 81'; Perez Baldoni 90+3'	Report	Rasorewa 21'

Stade Fautaua, Pirae
Attendance: 100
Referee: Ben Aukwai (Solomon Islands)
31 July 2024
15:00

Cook Islands	3–1	Vanuatu
Webb 47' (pen.), 85' (pen.); Rasmussen 60'	Report	Taravaki 12'

Stade Fautaua, Pirae
Referee: Norbert Hauata (Tahiti)

3 August 2024
12:00

Cook Islands	0–7	New Zealand
	Report	Smith 2', 10'; Banza 14'; Britton 29', 43', 90+5'; Perniskie 64'

Stade Fautaua, Pirae
Attendance: 100
Referee: Norbert Hauata (Tahiti)
3 August 2024
15:00

Vanuatu	2–3	Fiji
Manipen 8'; Taravaki 52'	Report	Samy 34'; Shankar 44'; Rasorewa 80'

Stade Fautaua, Pirae
Attendance: 100
Referee: David Yareboinen (Papua New Guinea)

=== Group B ===
Pos	Team	Pld	W	D	L	GF	GA	GD	Pts	Qualification
1	Tahiti (H)	3	3	0	0	6	3	+3	9	Knockout stage
2	New Caledonia	3	1	0	2	7	6	+1	3	Knockout stage
3	Samoa	3	1	0	2	4	5	−1	3	5th place match
4	Solomon Islands	3	1	0	2	6	9	−3	3	7th place match

Source: OFC
(H) Hosts
29 July 2024
15:00

New Caledonia	0–2	Samoa
	Report	Nyikeine 17' (o.g.); Enoka 40'

Stade Pater, Pirae
Attendance: 200
Referee: Neeshil Varman (Fiji)
29 July 2024
18:00

Tahiti	2–1	Solomon Islands
Colombani 48'; Brown 83'	Report	Kwaimasia 3'

Stade Pater, Pirae
Attendance: 300
Referee: Chris Bennett (New Zealand)

1 August 2024
15:00

Solomon Islands	3–1	Samoa
Makana 64'; Sihiu 65'; Kwaimasia 82'	Report	Hansell 37'

Stade Pater, Pirae
Attendance: 150
Referee: Adam Bavcar (Australia)
1 August 2024
18:00

New Caledonia	1–2	Tahiti
Kutran 22' (pen.)	Report	Colombani 40' (pen.), 79'

Stade Pater, Pirae
Attendance: 350
Referee: David Yareboinen (Papua New Guinea)

4 August 2024
15:00

Solomon Islands	2–6	New Caledonia
Makana 53'; Sihiu 67'	Report	Ijelipa 17', 35', 62', 80'; Pautre 77'; Trohmae 86'

Stade Pater, Pirae
Attendance: 100
Referee: Shane Skinner (Australia)
4 August 2024
18:00

Samoa	1–2	Tahiti
Edward 45+1'	Report	Tereroa 12'; Arapahi 78'

Stade Pater, Pirae
Attendance: 250
Referee: Chris Bennett (New Zealand)

== 7th place match ==
8 August 2024
15:00

Vanuatu	0–1	Solomon Islands
	Report	Sihiu 73' (pen.)

Stade Fautaua, Pirae
Attendance: 50
Referee: Neeshil Varman (Fiji)

== 5th place match ==
8 August 2024
12:00

Cook Islands	1–2	Samoa
Webb 90+2' (pen.)	Report	Kapisi 6', 8'

Stade Fautaua, Pirae
Attendance: 100
Referee: Shama Maemae (Solomon Islands)

== Knockout stage ==
=== Bracket ===
Semi-finals
7 August – Pirae
New Zealand	5
New Caledonia	0
7 August – Pirae
Tahiti	1
Fiji	2

Final
10 August – Pirae
New Zealand	3
Fiji	1
Third place match
10 August – Pirae
New Caledonia (p)	1 (5)
Tahiti	1 (4)

=== Semi-finals ===
Winners qualified for the 2025 FIFA U-17 World Cup.

7 August 2024
15:00

New Zealand	5–0	New Caledonia
Cartwright 3', 43', 53'; Cardozo 29'; Smith 69' (pen.)	Report

Stade Pater, Pirae
Attendance: 300
Referee: Norbert Hauata (Tahiti)
7 August 2024
18:00

Tahiti	1–2	Fiji
Kubucaucau 70' (o.g.)	Report	Rasorewa 7', 68'

Stade Pater, Pirae
Attendance: 500
Referee: Ben Aukwai (Solomon Islands)

=== Third place match ===
Winner qualified for the 2025 FIFA U-17 World Cup.

10 August 2024
15:00

New Caledonia	1–1	Tahiti
Iopue 25'	Report	Tereroa 64'
Penalties
	5–4

Stade Pater, Pirae
Attendance: 500
Referee: Ben Aukwai (Solomon Islands)

=== Final ===
10 August 2024
18:00

New Zealand	3–1	Fiji
Martin 3'; Brooke-Smith 62'; Cardozo 67'	Report	Khan 28'

Stade Pater, Pirae
Attendance: 200
Referee: David Yareboinen (Papua New Guinea)

== Broadcasting ==
All games will be streamed live and free on FIFA+.

== Awards ==
The following awards were given at the conclusion of the tournament.

Award	Player
Golden Ball	(New Zealand) Aaron Cartwright
Golden Boot	(New Zealand) Aaron Cartwright
Golden Gloves	(New Caledonia) Nicolas Kutran
Fair Play	Tahiti

== Qualified teams for FIFA U-17 World Cup ==
The following three teams from OFC qualified for the 2025 FIFA U-17 World Cup in Qatar.

Team	Qualified on	Previous appearances in FIFA U-17 World Cup^{1}
New Zealand	7 August 2024	10 (1997, 1999, 2007, 2009, 2011, 2013, 2015, 2017, 2019, 2023)
Fiji	7 August 2024	0 (debut)
New Caledonia	10 August 2024	2 (2017, 2023)

^{1} Bold indicates champions for that year. Italic indicates hosts for that year.
