= 2018 OFC U-16 Championship =

Tournament details
- Host countries: Qualifying stage: Tonga; Final tournament: Solomon Islands
- Dates: Qualifying stage: 14–20 July 2018; Final tournament: 9–22 September 2018
- Teams: Final tournament: 8 Total: 11 (from 1 confederation)
- Venue: 2 (in 2 host cities)

Final positions
- Champions: New Zealand (8th title)
- Runners-up: Solomon Islands
- Third place: Tahiti
- Fourth place: Fiji

Tournament statistics
- Matches played: 22
- Goals scored: 100 (4.55 per match)
- Attendance: 48,200 (2,191 per match)
- Top scorer(s): (Solomon Islands) Raphael Lea'i (8 goals)
- Best player: (Solomon Islands) Raphael Lea'i
- Best goalkeeper: (New Zealand) Alex Paulsen
- Fair play award: Solomon Islands

The 2018 OFC U-16 Championship was the 18th edition of the OFC U-16/U-17 Championship, the biennial international youth football championship organised by the Oceania Football Confederation (OFC) for the men's under-16/under-17 national teams of Oceania. The qualifying stage was held in Tonga between 14 and 20 July 2018, and the final tournament was held in the Solomon Islands between 9–22 September 2018.

Before the last tournament the age limit was reduced by a year to 16 years of age. However the last tournament remained the name U-17 Championship. For this tournament, the name has changed to U-16 Championship. So players who want to participate in the tournament needed to be born on or after 1 January 2002. At an OFC Executive Committee meeting held at its Auckland headquarters in November 2013 the competition format was modified. The competition was brought forward a year and the age limit was lowered to 16 years of age. The changes were made in order to allow the winner of the competition plenty of time for preparation and player development for upcoming World Cups at Under 17 level.

In March 2015, FIFA decided that the OFC gets two slots at every FIFA U-20 and U-17 World Cup. So the top two teams of the tournament qualified for the 2019 FIFA U-17 World Cup in Brazil as the OFC representatives. New Zealand, the defending champions, won the title for the eighth time, and qualified together with runners-up Solomon Islands.

== Format ==
The tournament structure is as follows:

- Qualifying stage: The four teams from the "developing associations" (American Samoa, Cook Islands, Samoa and Tonga) play in the qualifying stage. The winner of the round-robin tournament qualify for the final tournament.
- Final tournament: A total of eight teams (Fiji, New Caledonia, New Zealand, Papua New Guinea, Solomon Islands, Tahiti, Vanuatu, and the qualifying stage winner) play in the final tournament. For the group stage, they are divided into two groups of four teams. The top two teams of each group advance to the knockout stage (semi-finals and final) to decide the winner of the OFC U-16 Championship and the two teams that qualify for the FIFA U-17 World Cup.

The draw for the tournament was held on 2 February 2018 at the OFC Headquarters in Auckland, New Zealand. In both the qualifying stage and the final tournament, the hosts (Tonga and Solomon Islands) were assigned to position A1 in the draw, while the remaining teams were drawn into the other positions without any seeding.

== Teams ==
All 11 FIFA-affiliated national teams from the OFC entered the tournament.

Note: All appearance statistics include those in the qualifying stage (since 2017).

Team	Stage	Appearance	Previous best performance
Fiji	Final tournament (Group stage)	17th	Runners-up (1999)
New Caledonia	Final tournament (Group stage)	11th	Runners-up (2003, 2013, 2017)
New Zealand	Final tournament (Group stage)	16th	Champions (1997, 2007, 2009, 2011, 2013, 2015, 2017)
Papua New Guinea	Final tournament (Group stage)	9th	Semi-finals (2017), Fourth place (1986)
Solomon Islands (hosts)	Final tournament (Group stage)	9th	Runners-up (1993)
Tahiti	Final tournament (Group stage)	13th	Runners-up (2007, 2009, 2011, 2015)
Vanuatu	Final tournament (Group stage)	14th	Runners-up (2005)
American Samoa	Qualifying stage	8th	Group stage (1999, 2001, 2003, 2011, 2015)
Cook Islands	Qualifying stage	9th	Group stage (1997, 1999, 2003, 2005, 2011, 2013, 2015)
Samoa	Qualifying stage	8th	Group stage (1997, 1999, 2001, 2003, 2015, 2017)
Tonga (hosts)	Qualifying stage	9th	Group stage (1999, 2001, 2003, 2005, 2011, 2015)

== Venues ==
The hosts of the qualifying stage and final tournament were announced by OFC on 31 October 2017.

- The qualifying stage was played at the Loto-Tonga Soka Centre in Nukuʻalofa, Tonga.
- The final tournament was played at the Lawson Tama Stadium in Honiara, Solomon Islands.

Tonga	Solomon Islands
‘Atele	Honiara
Loto-Tonga Soka Centre	Lawson Tama Stadium
Capacity: 1,500	Capacity: 20,000
2018 OFC U-16 Championship is located in Tonga	2018 OFC U-16 Championship is located in Solomon Islands

== Squads ==
Players born on or after 1 January 2002 are eligible to compete in the tournament. Each team can name a maximum of 20 players.

== Qualifying stage ==
The winner advance to the final tournament (group stage).

All times are local, TOT (UTC+13).

Pos	Team	Pld	W	D	L	GF	GA	GD	Pts	Qualification
1	Samoa	3	3	0	0	22	3	+19	9	Final tournament (Group stage)
2	American Samoa	3	1	1	1	8	13	−5	4	
3	Tonga (H)	3	0	2	1	2	11	−9	2	
4	Cook Islands	3	0	1	2	1	6	−5	1	

Source: OFC
(H) Hosts
14 July 2018
11:00

Samoa	3–0	Cook Islands
Filimalae 37', 75'; Belcher 45'	Report

Loto-Tonga Soka Centre, Nukuʻalofa
Attendance: 200
Referee: Campbell-Kirk Waugh (New Zealand)
14 July 2018
14:15 (Note: Kick-off of the match between American Samoa and Tonga was delayed from 14:00 to 14:15 due to "unforeseen circumstances".)

American Samoa	2–2	Tonga
Tiatia 51'; Taumua 53'	Report	Tuiono 58'; Muavesi 79' (pen.)

Loto-Tonga Soka Centre, Nukuʻalofa
Attendance: 300
Referee: Joel Hopken (Vanuatu)

17 July 2018
11:00

American Samoa	3–10	Samoa
Taumua 41' (pen.), 45'; Lauvao 70' (pen.)	Report	Saofaiga 3', 8'; Tumua Leo 14', 74'; Nanumea 22', 44'; Mano 77' (pen.); Belcher 90'; Filimalae 90', 90+6'

Loto-Tonga Soka Centre, Nukuʻalofa
Attendance: 100
Referee: Ben Aukwai (Solomon Islands)
17 July 2018
14:00

Tonga	0–0	Cook Islands
	Report

Loto-Tonga Soka Centre, Nukuʻalofa
Attendance: 200
Referee: Joel Hopken (Vanuatu)

20 July 2018
11:00

Cook Islands	1–3	American Samoa
Mateariki 50' (pen.)	Report	Taumua 31' (pen.); Lauvao 67' (pen.); Leatualevao 86'

Loto-Tonga Soka Centre, Nukuʻalofa
Attendance: 150
Referee: Ben Aukwai (Solomon Islands)
20 July 2018
14:00

Tonga	0–9	Samoa
	Report	Nanumea 8' (pen.), 30', 37', 45+1', 75'; Belcher 22'; Saofaiga 23'; Filimalae 39'; Mano 52'

Loto-Tonga Soka Centre, Nukuʻalofa
Attendance: 200
Referee: Campbell-Kirk Waugh (New Zealand)

== Group stage ==
The top two teams of each group advance to the semi-finals.

All times are local, SBT (UTC+11).

=== Group A ===
Pos	Team	Pld	W	D	L	GF	GA	GD	Pts	Qualification
1	Solomon Islands (H)	3	3	0	0	15	0	+15	9	Knockout stage
2	New Zealand	3	2	0	1	12	8	+4	6	Knockout stage
3	Papua New Guinea	3	1	0	2	8	9	−1	3	
4	Vanuatu	3	0	0	3	0	18	−18	0	

Source: OFC
(H) Hosts
9 September 2018
10:00

Vanuatu	0–8	New Zealand
	Report	Verney 9', 24'; Wilson 25'; Hamilton 37', 45+1'; van Hattum 55' (pen.), 76'; Lee 90+3'

Lawson Tama Stadium, Honiara
Attendance: 700
Referee: Norbert Hauata (Tahiti)
9 September 2018
15:00

Papua New Guinea	0–5	Solomon Islands
	Report	Lea'i 12', 30' (pen.), 41', 90+2'; Satu 70'

Lawson Tama Stadium, Honiara
Attendance: 3,500
Referee: Salesh Chand (Fiji)

12 September 2018
10:00

Papua New Guinea	5–0	Vanuatu
Beschel 7', 79'; Ila 19'; Devi 56'; Wadunah 70'	Report

Lawson Tama Stadium, Honiara
Attendance: 200
Referee: Sione Mau (American Samoa)
12 September 2018
15:00

Solomon Islands	5–0	New Zealand
Wae 18'; Lea'i 41', 85'; Kofana 55'; Keana 87'	Report

Lawson Tama Stadium, Honiara
Attendance: 6,000
Referee: Norbert Hauata (Tahiti)

15 September 2018
10:00

New Zealand	4–3	Papua New Guinea
Hamilton 47', 55'; Wilson 48'; Old 83'	Report	Beschel 37', 75', 90'

Lawson Tama Stadium, Honiara
Attendance: 2,000
Referee: Salesh Chand (Fiji)
15 September 2018
15:00

Solomon Islands	5–0	Vanuatu
Wae 4'; H. Pao 20'; Lea'i 47'; Mani 53', 64'	Report

Lawson Tama Stadium, Honiara
Attendance: 8,000
Referee: Sione Lelenga (Tonga)

=== Group B ===
Pos	Team	Pld	W	D	L	GF	GA	GD	Pts	Qualification
1	Tahiti	3	3	0	0	10	2	+8	9	Knockout stage
2	Fiji	3	2	0	1	4	5	−1	6	Knockout stage
3	New Caledonia	3	0	1	2	2	4	−2	1	
4	Samoa	3	0	1	2	4	9	−5	1	

Source: OFC
10 September 2018
12:00 (Note: Kick-off of the match between Samoa and Fiji was delayed from 10:00 to 12:00 due to Samoa's disrupted flight schedule.)

Samoa	2–3	Fiji
Mano 7', 18'	Report	Kumar 45+2'; Sela 63', 79' (pen.)

Lawson Tama Stadium, Honiara
Attendance: 200
Referee: Hamilton Siau (Solomon Islands)
10 September 2018
15:00

New Caledonia	1–2	Tahiti
Matha 76'	Report	Sangue 10'; Kaiha 52'

Lawson Tama Stadium, Honiara
Attendance: 1,000
Referee: Cory Mills (New Zealand)

13 September 2018
10:00

Fiji	0–3	Tahiti
	Report	Kaiha 36', 56'; Gitton 47'

Lawson Tama Stadium, Honiara
Attendance: 200
Referee: George Time (Solomon Islands)
13 September 2018
15:00

Samoa	1–1	New Caledonia
Filimalae 44'	Report	Kutran 23'

Lawson Tama Stadium, Honiara
Attendance: 250
Referee: Joel Hopken (Vanuatu)

16 September 2018
10:00

Fiji	1–0	New Caledonia
Kumar 45'	Report

Lawson Tama Stadium, Honiara
Referee: David Yareboinen (Papua New Guinea)
16 September 2018
15:00

Tahiti	5–1	Samoa
Hanere 11'; Labaste 45+4' (pen.), 50'; Gitton 45+6', 55'	Report	Filimalae 2'

Lawson Tama Stadium, Honiara
Attendance: 1,000
Referee: Joel Hopken (Vanuatu)

== Knockout stage ==
=== Bracket ===
Semi-finals
19 September – Honiara
Solomon Islands	3
Fiji	1
19 September – Honiara
Tahiti	1
New Zealand	4

Final
22 September – Honiara
Solomon Islands	0 (4)
New Zealand (p)	0 (5)
Third place
22 September – Honiara
Fiji	1
Tahiti	2

=== Semi-finals ===
Winners qualify for 2019 FIFA U-17 World Cup.

19 September 2018
10:00

Solomon Islands	3–1	Fiji
Mani 1', 29'; Lea'i 90+1'	Report	Pillay 45+3'

Lawson Tama Stadium, Honiara
Attendance: 8,000
Referee: David Yareboinen (Papua New Guinea)

19 September 2018
15:00

Tahiti	1–4	New Zealand
Sangue 79'	Report	van Hattum 2'; Hamilton 13', 24'; Garbett 82' (pen.)

Lawson Tama Stadium, Honiara
Attendance: 2,500
Referee: George Time (Solomon Islands)

=== Third place match ===
22 September 2018
10:00

Fiji	1–2	Tahiti
Naresh 89'	Report	Gitton 28'; Holozet 78'

Lawson Tama Stadium, Honiara
Attendance: 1,500
Referee: Sione Lelenga (Tonga)

=== Final ===
22 September 2018
15:00

Solomon Islands	0–0	New Zealand
	Report
Penalties
Satu (penalty scored); Keana (penalty scored); Taebo (penalty missed); Mani (penalty scored); Lea'i (penalty scored)	4–5	(penalty scored) van Hattum; (penalty scored) Stamenic; (penalty scored) Garbett; (penalty scored) Lee; (penalty scored) Bright

Lawson Tama Stadium, Honiara
Attendance: 12,000
Referee: Norbert Hauata (Tahiti)

== Winners ==
2018 OFC U-16 Championship

New Zealand
Eighth title

== Goalscorers ==
In the qualifying stage, there were 33 goals scored in 6 matches, for an average of 5.5 goals per match. In the final tournament, there were 67 goals scored in 16 matches, for an average of 4.19 goals per match. In total, there were 100 goals scored in 22 matches, for an average of 4.55 goals per match.

8 goals

- (Solomon Islands) Raphael Lea'i

7 goals

- (Samoa) Jarvis Filimalae (5 in qualifying)
- (Samoa) Falaniko Nanumea (in qualifying)

6 goals

- (New Zealand) Henry Hamilton

5 goals

- (Papua New Guinea) Siegfried Beschel

4 goals

- (American Samoa) Gabriel Taumua (in qualifying)
- (Samoa) Lotial Mano (2 in qualifying)
- (Solomon Islands) Charles Mani
- (French Polynesia) Tehotu Gitton

3 goals

- (New Zealand) Oskar van Hattum
- (Samoa) Fetuao Belcher (in qualifying)
- (Samoa) Kawasaki Saofaiga (in qualifying)
- (French Polynesia) Denji Kaiha

2 goals

- (American Samoa) Peter Lauvao (in qualifying)
- (Fiji) Josaia Sela
- (New Zealand) Ryan Verney
- (New Zealand) Bradley Wilson
- (Samoa) John Tumua Leo (in qualifying)
- (Solomon Islands) Javin Wae
- (French Polynesia) Ariiura Labaste
- (French Polynesia) Tekaki Sangue

1 goal

- (American Samoa) Xavior Leatualevao (in qualifying)
- (American Samoa) Milo Tiatia (in qualifying)
- (Cook Islands) Toru Mateariki (in qualifying)
- (Fiji) Eshan Kumar
- (Fiji) Nikhi Pillay
- (Fiji) Rahul Naresh
- (New Caledonia) Ruben Kutran
- (New Caledonia) Andre Matha
- (New Zealand) Matt Garbett
- (New Zealand) Joseph Lee
- (New Zealand) Benjamin Old
- (Papua New Guinea) Morris Devi
- (Papua New Guinea) Renagi Ila
- (Papua New Guinea) Akaya Wadunah
- (Solomon Islands) Maxwell Keana
- (Solomon Islands) Leon Kofana
- (Solomon Islands) Hamilton Pao
- (Solomon Islands) Chris Satu
- (French Polynesia) Heihau Hanere
- (French Polynesia) Tehauarii Holozet
- (Tonga) Joseph Muavesi (in qualifying)
- (Tonga) Henry Tuiono (in qualifying)

== Awards ==
The Golden Ball Award is awarded to the most outstanding player of the tournament. The Golden Glove Award is awarded to the best goalkeeper of the tournament. The Golden Boot Award is awarded to the top scorer of the tournament. The Fair Play Award is awarded to the team with the best disciplinary record at the tournament.

Award	Recipient
Golden Ball	(Solomon Islands) Raphael Le'ai
Golden Glove	(New Zealand) Alex Paulsen
Golden Boot	(Solomon Islands) Raphael Le'ai (8 goals)
Fair Play Award	Solomon Islands

== Qualified teams for FIFA U-17 World Cup ==
The following two teams from OFC qualify for the 2019 FIFA U-17 World Cup.

Team	Qualified on	Previous appearances in FIFA U-17 World Cup^{1}
Solomon Islands	19 September 2018	0 (debut)
New Zealand	19 September 2018	8 (1997, 1999, 2007, 2009, 2011, 2013, 2015, 2017)

^{1} Bold indicates champions for that year. Italic indicates hosts for that year.

== Age fraud controversy ==
The Solomon Islands, which originally finished second, were found by the OFC to have deliberately fielded overage player Chris Satu during the tournament and would forfeit all results and their place in the 2019 FIFA U-17 World Cup. The decision was reviewed under appeal from the Solomon Islands Football Federation. The OFC Executive Committee announced on 3 May 2019 that Solomon Islands would keep their spot for the FIFA U-17 World Cup on the grounds that the federation had not knowingly broken the rules as Satu had a government issued passport showing his eligibility.

On 11 December 2019, it was found that Solomon Islands' player Maxwell Keana played in five games with a "false birth certificate and passport to improperly seek eligibility" for the competition. As a result, the Solomon Islands Football Federation was sanctioned and the Oceania Football Confederation banned the Solomon Islands from entering a team in the 2023 OFC U-17 Championship.
