= Vanuatu national under-17 football team =

National association football team

Vanuatu U17
- Association: Vanuatu Football Federation
- Confederation: OFC (Oceania)
- Head coach: (Vanuatu) Rocky Neveserveth
- Captain: Julian Banga
- Most caps: Joseph Iaruel
- Top scorer: Sylvain Worworbu (11)
- FIFA code: VAN
First colours	Second colours

First international
- Australia 24 - 0 Vanuatu (Australia; January 24, 1989)

Biggest win
- Vanuatu 20 - 0 American Samoa (Pago Pago, American Samoa; March 27, 2026)

Biggest defeat
- Australia 24 - 0 Vanuatu (Australia; January 24, 1989)

World Cup
- Appearances: 0

OFC Under-17 Championship
- Appearances: 15 (first in 1989)
- Best result: Runners-up (2005)

The Vanuatu national under-17 football team is the national U-17 team of Vanuatu and is controlled by the Vanuatu Football Federation.

== History ==
The Vanuatu national under-17 football team has currently taken part in the tournament 15 times (1989, 1993, 1995, 1997, 1999, 2001, 2003, 2005, 2009, 2011, 2013, 2015, 2017, 2018 & 2023). Their best result was in 2005 when the team reached the final, but they lost it against Australia. During the 2015 Tournament, Sylvain Worworbu scored 11 goals. After this tournament, both top scorer Sylvain Worworbu and captain Joseph Iaruel got a scholarship for two years at St Peter's College. This was the first time that a Vanuatu player got a scholarship.

== Competition Record ==
=== FIFA U-17 World Cup record ===
FIFA U-17 World Cup record
Year	Round	Pld	W	D	L	GF	GA	GD	Pts
(China) 1985 to (Canada) 1987	Did not participate								
(Scotland) 1989	Did not qualify								
(Italy) 1991	Did not participate								
(Japan) 1993 to (Peru) 2005	Did not qualify								
(South Korea) 2007	Did not participate								
(Nigeria) 2009 to (Qatar) 2025	Did not qualify								
(Qatar) 2026	to be determined								
Total	-	0	0	0	0	0	0	0	0

=== OFC U-17 Championship record ===
The OFC U-17 Championship is a tournament held once every two years to decide the only two qualification spots for the Oceania Football Confederation (OFC) and its representatives at the FIFA U-17 World Cup.

OFC U-17 Championship								Qualification record					
Year	Round	Pld	W	D	L	GF	GA	Pld	W	D	L	GF	GA
(New Zealand) 1983	Did not enter							No qualification					
(Chinese Taipei) 1986	Did not enter							No qualification					
(Australia) 1989	Group stage	4	0	0	4	0	51	No qualification					
(New Zealand) 1991	Did not enter							No qualification					
(New Zealand) 1993	Group stage	2	0	1	1	1	11	No qualification					
(Vanuatu) 1995	Third place	4	2	0	2	5	10	No qualification					
(New Zealand) 1997	Group stage	3	1	0	2	7	10	No qualification					
(Fiji) 1999	Group stage	5	3	0	2	32	15	No qualification					
(Samoa) (Vanuatu) 2001	Group stage	4	2	1	1	16	3	No qualification					
(American Samoa) (Australia) (New Caledonia) 2003	Group stage	5	3	1	1	17	7	No qualification					
(New Caledonia) 2005	Runners-up	5	3	0	2	26	7	No qualification					
(French Polynesia) 2007	Did not enter							No qualification					
(New Zealand) 2009	Fourth place	3	0	0	3	1	8	No qualification					
(New Zealand) 2011	Fourth place	5	3	0	2	13	7	No qualification					
(Samoa) (Vanuatu) 2013	Third place	5	2	2	1	9	6	Qualified automatically					
(American Samoa) (Samoa) 2015	Third place	6	4	0	2	31	8	No qualification					
(Samoa) (French Polynesia) 2017	Group stage	3	0	1	2	5	7	Qualified automatically					
(Tonga) (Solomon Islands) 2018	Group stage	3	0	0	3	0	18	Qualified automatically					
(Fiji) 2023	Quarter-finals	3	1	0	2	3	4	No qualification					
(Tonga) (French Polynesia) 2024	Group stage	4	0	0	4	3	16	Qualified automatically					
(Tonga) (Solomon Islands) 2025	Did not qualify							3	0	3	0	4	4
(Tonga) (Papua New Guinea) 2026	To be determined							To be determined					
Total	Runners-up	64	24	6	34	169	188	3	0	3	0	4	4

== Current squad ==
The following players were called up for the 2018 OFC U-16 Championship from 9 to 22 September 2018.

Caps and goals as of 15 September 2018 after the game against Solomon Islands.

No.	Pos.	Player	Date of birth (age)	Caps	Goals	Club
1	GK	Jimson Shem	28 February 2003 (age 23)	1	0	(Vanuatu Football Federation) Lycee Lab
20	GK	Brendon Tankon	24 July 2003 (age 23)	2	0	(Vanuatu Football Federation) Mauriki
2	DF	Manro Tenene	17 March 2003 (age 23)	3	0	(Vanuatu Football Federation) Erakor Golden Star
3	DF	Andrewson Maltera	15 August 2002 (age 24)	1	0	(Vanuatu Football Federation) Malapoa College
4	DF	Francois Atel	10 May 2002 (age 24)	3	0	(Vanuatu Football Federation) Ifira Black Bird
12	DF	Karl Dingley	8 December 2002 (age 23)	3	0	(Vanuatu Football Federation) Centreville School
16	DF	Kalpaisi Taiwia	28 February 2002 (age 24)	1	0	(Vanuatu Football Federation) Central School
6	MF	Julian Banga	23 February 2002 (age 24)	3	0	(Vanuatu Football Federation) Santo East School
7	MF	Thompson Kalopilelu	30 October 2002 (age 23)	3	0	(Vanuatu Football Federation) Onesua
8	MF	Ronaldinho Kalkau	4 November 2005 (age 20)	1	0	(Vanuatu Football Federation) Malapoa College
10	MF	Semici Kaltack	10 May 2003 (age 23)	1	0	(Vanuatu Football Federation) Erakor Golden Star
11	MF	Pietro Takaro	7 April 2002 (age 24)	3	0	(Vanuatu Football Federation) Malapoa College
14	MF	Junior Okao	1 June 2002 (age 24)	2	0	(Vanuatu Football Federation) Seaside School
15	MF	Bathis Nalau	5 May 2004 (age 22)	1	0	(Vanuatu Football Federation) Vila North School
17	MF	Alandro Sau	14 November 2002 (age 23)	2	0	(Vanuatu Football Federation) Vila North School
5	FW	Brian Malas	1 April 2003 (age 23)	3	0	(Vanuatu Football Federation) Mauriki
9	FW	AJ Zachary	19 April 2004 (age 22)	3	0	(Vanuatu Football Federation) Erakor Golden Star
13	FW	Austin Holi	26 May 2003 (age 23)	2	0	(Vanuatu Football Federation) Malapoa College
18	FW	Jemmy Kaloroa	11 February 2002 (age 24)	2	0	(Vanuatu Football Federation) Central School
19	FW	Jonah Abel	10 June 2002 (age 24)	2	0	(Vanuatu Football Federation) Central School

== List of coaches ==
- (Vanuatu) Wilson August (2010-2011)
- (Vanuatu) Etienne Mermer (2012-2016)
- (Vanuatu) Rocky Neveserveth (2016-)
