= Solomon Islands national under-17 football team =

National association football team

Solomon Islands U17
- Nickname: The Katukatus
- Association: Solomon Islands Football Federation
- Confederation: OFC (Oceania)
- Head coach: (Solomon Islands) Stanley Waita
- Top scorer: Raphael Lea'i (14)
- FIFA code: SOL
First colours	Second colours

First international
- Australia 2–0 Solomon Islands (Honiara, Solomon Islands; 1993)

Biggest win
- Solomon Islands 15–0 Tonga (Auckland, New Zealand; 13 January 2011)

Biggest defeat
- Solomon Islands 0–8 Mexico (Cariacica, Brazil; 3 November 2019); Solomon Islands 0–8 New Zealand (Honiara, Solomon Islands, 24 August 2025)

FIFA U-17 World Cup
- Appearances: 1 (first in 2019)
- Best result: Group stage (2019)

OFC U-16 Men's Championship
- Appearances: 9 (first in 1993)
- Best result: Second Place (1993, 2018)

The Solomon Islands national under-17 football team is the national U-17 team of Solomon Islands and is controlled by the Solomon Islands Football Federation.

== History ==
In the 2015 OFC U-17 Championship striker Larry Zama scored thirteen goals in the course of the campaign making him the top goal scorer of the tournament. He scored eight goals in a single game against American Samoa, a tournament record to that date. In the semi-finals of the 2018 OFC U-16 Championship Solomon Islands defeated Fiji to qualify for the 2019 FIFA U-17 World Cup in Peru. Solomon Islands were to make their FIFA U-17 World Cup Debut in Peru in 2019; however on 15 February 2019 Solomon Islands seemed to have forfeited their chance of playing in the event due to over-age player Chris Satu. In February 2019 it was also announced that Raphael Lea'i and Leon Kofana will go to Scots College, Wellington and train with Wellington Phoenix FC. On 3 March 2019, upon OFC Executive Committee appeal Solomon Islands were able to keep their spot for the 2019 FIFA U-17 World Cup, which will now be played in Brazil after Peru's hosting rights were withdrawn due to infrastructure concerns and delays of the organising committee. Their first FIFA U-17 World Cup match is on 28 October 2019 in Group F where Solomon Islands will play against Italy, then 31 October where they will play against Paraguay and the last Group F on 3 November which they will play against Mexico.

== Competition Record ==
=== FIFA U-17 World Cup record ===
FIFA U-17 World Cup record
Year	Round	Pld	W	D	L	GF	GA	GD	Pts
(Japan) 1993 to (Peru) 2005	Did not qualify								
(South Korea) 2007 to (Nigeria) 2009	Did not participate								
(Mexico) 2011	Did not qualify								
(United Arab Emirates) 2013	Withdrew								
(Chile) 2015 to (India) 2017	Did not qualify								
(Brazil) 2019	Group Stage	3	0	0	3	0	20	-20	0
(Indonesia) 2023	Disqualified from qualification, thus did not qualify								
(Qatar) 2025	to be determined								
Total	Group Stage	3	0	0	3	0	20	-20	0

=== OFC U-17 Championship record ===
The OFC Under 17 Championship is a tournament held once every two years to decide the only two qualification spots for the Oceania Football Confederation (OFC) and its representatives at the FIFA U-17 World Cup.

OFC Under-17 Championship
Year	Round	Pld	W	D	L	GF	GA	GD	Pts
(New Zealand) 1993	Runners-up	4	2	0	2	3	6	-3	2
(Vanuatu) 1995	Fourth Place	4	0	1	3	3	8	-5	1
(New Zealand) 1997	Third Place	5	3	0	2	9	7	+2	6
(Fiji) 1999	Third Place	6	4	1	1	19	5	+14	12
(Samoa) / (Vanuatu) 2001	Group Stage	4	2	0	2	20	3	+17	6
(American Samoa) / (Australia) / (New Caledonia) 2003	Group Stage	5	2	1	2	18	6	+12	7
(New Caledonia) 2005	Third Place	6	3	2	1	20	8	+12	8
(French Polynesia) 2007	Did not participate	-	-	-	-	-	-	-	-
(New Zealand) 2009	Did not participate	-	-	-	-	-	-	-	-
(New Zealand) 2011	Third Place	5	4	0	1	24	4	+20	12
(Vanuatu) 2013	Withdrew	-	-	-	-	-	-	-	-
(American Samoa) / (Samoa) 2015	Group Stage	4	2	0	2	24	6	+18	6
(French Polynesia) 2017	Semi-finals	4	1	1	2	16	6	+10	4
(Solomon Islands) 2018	Second Place	5	4	0	1	18	1	+17	12
(Fiji) 2023	Disqualified from participating	-	-	-	-	-	-	-	-
Total	Runners-up	52	27	6	19	174	60	+114	76

== History Matches ==
=== 2015 ===
13 January 2015 2015 OFC U-17 Championship	Solomon Islands	10–1	Tonga	Pago Pago, American Samoa
15:30 UTC−11	Junior Hou 19', 58'; Larry Zama 20', 53', 78', 85'; Richard Raramo 31', 60'; Kaliz Atu 75'; Hendrick Jirah 89'	Report	Soakai Vea 14'	Stadium: Pago Park Soccer Stadium; Referee: (Fiji) Salesh Chand

17 January 2015 2015 OFC U-17 Championship	Vanuatu	2–1	Solomon Islands	Pago Pago, American Samoa
15:30 UTC−11	Sylvain Worworbu 6'; Ronaldo Wilkins 62' (pen.)	Report	Larry Zama 43'	Stadium: Pago Park Soccer Stadium; Referee: (French Polynesia) Averii Jacques

19 January 2015 2015 OFC U-17 Championship	Tahiti (French Polynesia)	3–0	Solomon Islands	Pago Pago, American Samoa
13:00 UTC−11	Marc Siejidr 35'; Michel Maihi 45+4' (pen.); 59' (o.g.)	Report		Stadium: Pago Park Soccer Stadium; Referee: (New Zealand) Anna-Marie Keighley

21 January 2015 2015 OFC U-17 Championship	Solomon Islands	13–0	American Samoa	Pago Pago, American Samoa
13:00 UTC−11	Larry Zama 9', 27', 39', 45+6', 52', 68', 88', 90'; Philip Maeta 42', 70'; Junior Hou 72'; Benjimin Toata 76'; Hendrick Jirah 81'	Report		Stadium: Pago Park Soccer Stadium; Referee: (Papua New Guinea) Hillary Any

=== 2017 ===
12 February 2017 2017 OFC U-17 Championship Group Stage	Fiji	1–1	Solomon Islands	(French Polynesia) Papeete, Tahiti
19:00	Dau 4'	Report	Mana 52'	Stadium: Stade Pater, Pirae; Attendance: 550; Referee: Norbert Hauata (Tahiti)

15 February 2017 2017 OFC U-17 Championship Group Stage	New Zealand	2–1	Solomon Islands	(French Polynesia) Papeete, Tahiti
16:00	Williams 3'; Spragg 84'	Report	Kaoni 48'	Stadium: Stade Pater, Pirae; Attendance: 500; Referee: Abdelkader Zitouni (Tahiti)

18 February 2017 2017 OFC U-17 Championship Group Stage	Solomon Islands	12–0	Samoa	(French Polynesia) Papeete, Tahiti
16:00	Mekawir 9', 19', 30'; Toata 29'; Kaoni 45+4', 67', 80', 88'; Keana 53', 65'; Allen 57', 79'	Report		Stadium: Stade Pater, Pirae; Attendance: 300; Referee: Joel Hopkken (Vanuatu)

21 February 2017 2017 OFC U-17 Championship Semi-finals	New Caledonia	3–2	Solomon Islands	(French Polynesia) Papeete, Tahiti
16:00	Bako 23'; Jeno 68'; Longue 80'	Report	Toata 62'; Allen 90+4'	Stadium: Stade Mahina, Mahina; Attendance: 400; Referee: Matthew Conger (New Zealand)

=== 2018 ===
9 September 2018 2018 OFC U-16 Championship Group Stage	Papua New Guinea	0–5	Solomon Islands	Honiara, Solomon Islands
15:00		Report	Lea'i 12', 30' (pen.), 41', 90+2'; Satu 70'	Stadium: Lawson Tama Stadium; Attendance: 3.500; Referee: Salesh Chand (Fiji)

12 September 2018 2018 OFC U-16 Championship Group Stage	Solomon Islands	5–0	New Zealand	Honiara, Solomon Islands
15:00	Wae 18'; Lea'i 41', 85'; Kofana 55'; Keana 87'	Report		Stadium: Lawson Tama Stadium; Attendance: 6.000; Referee: (French Polynesia) Norbert Hauata (Tahiti)

15 September 2018 2018 OFC U-16 Championship Group Stage	Solomon Islands	5–0	Vanuatu	Honiara, Solomon Islands
15:00	Wae 4'; H. Pao 20'; Lea'i 47'; Mani 53', 64'	Report		Stadium: Lawson Tama Stadium; Attendance: 8.000; Referee: Sione Lelenga (Tonga)

19 September 2018 2018 OFC U-16 Championship Semi-Final	Solomon Islands	3–1	Fiji	Honiara, Solomon Islands
10:00	Mani 1', 29'; Lea'i 90+1'	Report	Pillay 45+3'	Stadium: Lawson Tama Stadium; Attendance: 8.000; Referee: (Papua New Guinea) David Yareboinen (Papua New Guinea)

22 September 2018 2018 OFC U-16 Championship Final	Solomon Islands	0–0 (4–5 p)	New Zealand	Honiara, Solomon Islands
15:00		Report		Stadium: Lawson Tama Stadium; Attendance: 12.000; Referee: (French Polynesia) Norbert Hauata (Tahiti)
	Penalties
	Satu (penalty scored); Keana (penalty scored); Taebo (penalty missed); Mani (penalty scored); Lea'i (penalty scored)		(penalty scored) Van Hattum; (penalty scored) Stamenic; (penalty scored) Garbett; (penalty scored) Lee; (penalty scored) Bright

=== 2019 ===
26 April 2019 Friendly	Jersey	2–3	Solomon Islands	Saint Helier, Jersey
12:00				Stadium: Springfield Stadium

29 April 2019 UEFA international development tournament 2019	Moldova	1–2	Solomon Islands	Minsk, Belarus
12:00			Mani 50'; Lea'i 80'

2 May 2019 UEFA international development tournament 2019	Belarus	1–1	Solomon Islands	Minsk, Belarus
17:00			Lea'i 60'

4 May 2019 UEFA international development tournament 2019	Solomon Islands	2–2	Kazakhstan	Minsk, Belarus
13:00	Lea'i 40', 80'

28 October 2019 2019 FIFA U-17 World Cup Group Stage	Solomon Islands	0–5	Italy	Gama, Brazil
				Stadium: Estádio Bezerrão

31 October 2019 2019 FIFA U-17 World Cup Group Stage	Solomon Islands	0–7	Paraguay	Gama, Brazil
				Stadium: Estádio Bezerrão

3 November 2019 2019 FIFA U-17 World Cup Group Stage	Mexico	8–0	Solomon Islands	Cariacica, Brazil
				Stadium: Estádio Kléber Andrade

== Current Technical Staff ==
Position	
Head coach	(Solomon Islands) Stanley Waita
Assistant coach	(Solomon Islands) Vivian Wickham
Goalkeeper coach	(Solomon Islands) Santus Kabini
Team manager	(Solomon Islands) Robert Seni
Medical officer	(Solomon Islands) Dr. Kenton Sade

== Current squad ==
The following players were called up for the 2019 FIFA U-17 World Cup from 26 October – 17 November in Brazil.

Caps and goals as of 3 November 2019 after the game against Mexico.

No.	Pos.	Player	Date of birth (age)	Caps	Goals	Club
1	GK	Davidson Malam	25 November 2002 (age 23)	7	0	(Solomon Islands Football Federation) Laugu United
12	GK	Junior Petua	30 December 2003 (age 22)	0	0	(Solomon Islands Football Federation) Paritasi
21	GK	Gideon Suta	7 April 2003 (age 23)	1	0	(Solomon Islands Football Federation) Henderson Eels
2	DF	Derrick Taebo	18 August 2002 (age 24)	6	0	(Solomon Islands Football Federation) Henderson Eels
3	DF	Stanford Fakasori	10 October 2002 (age 23)	7	0	(Solomon Islands Football Federation) Uncles
4	DF	Leon Kofana	22 June 2002 (age 24)	7	1	(New Zealand Football) Wellington Phoenix
5	DF	Javin Alick	17 November 2002 (age 23)	8	2	(Solomon Islands Football Federation) Kossa
6	DF	Fresha Sofu	15 July 2002 (age 24)	0	0	(Solomon Islands Football Federation) Renbel Province
16	DF	Hensky Foata	3 June 2003 (age 23)	1	0	(Solomon Islands Football Federation) Kossa
18	DF	Zani Sale	4 May 2003 (age 23)	2	0	(Solomon Islands Football Federation) Kossa
20	DF	Pateson Tongaka	8 August 2004 (age 22)	3	0	(Solomon Islands Football Federation) Kossa
8	MF	Richie Kwaimamani	6 April 2002 (age 24)	5	0	(Solomon Islands Football Federation) Isabel United
11	MF	Philip Ropa	21 October 2002 (age 23)	6	0	(Solomon Islands Football Federation) Guadalcanal
13	MF	Alford Kanahanimae	1 October 2002 (age 24)	7	0	(Solomon Islands Football Federation) Guadalcanal
14	MF	Densly Geseni	21 June 2002 (age 24)	8	0	(Solomon Islands Football Federation) Solomon Warriors
15	MF	Alden Suri	4 April 2004 (age 22)	1	0	(New Zealand Football) Wellington Phoenix
7	MF	Bradley Irosaea	25 April 2003 (age 23)	1	0	(Solomon Islands Football Federation) Solomon Warriors
9	FW	Charles Mani	7 February 2002 (age 24)	8	4	(New Zealand Football) Glenfield Rovers
10	FW	Raphael Lea'i	9 September 2003 (age 23)	8	8	(The Football Association) Arsenal
17	FW	Barrie Limoki	2 March 2004 (age 22)	2	0	(New Zealand Football) Wellington Phoenix
19	FW	Selwyn Hou	2 December 2003 (age 22)	1	0	(Solomon Islands Football Federation) Henderson Eels

=== Recent call-ups ===
The following players have been called up for the team in the last 12 months.

Pos.	Player	Date of birth (age)	Caps	Goals	Club	Latest call-up
GK	Lucian Sade		0	0	(Solomon Islands) Western	Trainingscamp
DF	Benbate Lamupio	9 July 2003 (age 23)	3	0	(Solomon Islands) Western United	2018 OFC U-16 Championship
DF	Charlton Totori	16 October 2002 (age 23)	0	0	(Solomon Islands) Solomon Warriors	Traveling squad for the 2019 FIFA U-17 World Cup
DF	Fabio Pao	8 February 2003 (age 23)	2	0	(Solomon Islands) Western United	2018 OFC U-16 Championship
DF	Dexter Iniakwala		0	0	(Solomon Islands) Honiara	Trainingscamp
DF	John Pengalo		0	0	(Solomon Islands) Temotu	Trainingscamp
MF	Maxwell Keana	1 July 2002 (age 24)	5	1	(Solomon Islands) Kossa	
MF	Clayton Menapa	5 August 2002 (age 24)	2	0	(Solomon Islands) West Honiara	Traveling squad for the 2019 FIFA U-17 World Cup
MF	Cyral Enotorau		0	0	(Solomon Islands) Malaita Province	Pre-Squad squad for the 2019 FIFA U-17 World Cup
MF	Ashley Me'esa		0	0	(Solomon Islands) Temotu Province	Pre-Squad squad for the 2019 FIFA U-17 World Cup
MF	Hamilton Pao	6 November 2003 (age 22)	1	1	(Solomon Islands) Western United	2018 OFC U-16 Championship
MF	Yanop Thompson		0	0	(Solomon Islands) Temotu	Trainingscamp
FW	Steward Quanafia	11 June 2002 (age 24)	4	0	(Solomon Islands) Makuru	Pre-Squad squad for the 2019 FIFA U-17 World Cup
FW	Goldy Ogaoga	10 August 2003 (age 23)	0	0	(Solomon Islands) Guadalcanal Province	Traveling squad for the 2019 FIFA U-17 World Cup
FW	Floyd Hagi		0	0	(Solomon Islands) Malaita	Trainingscamp

== 2017 squad ==
The following players were called up for the 2017 OFC U-17 Championship from 11 to 24 February 2017.

Caps and goals as of 18 January 2017 after the game against Samoa.

No.	Pos.	Player	Date of birth (age)	Caps	Goals	Club
1	GK	Joel Nanago	13 December 2000 (age 25)	4	0	(Solomon Islands Football Federation) Henderson Eels
12	GK	John Brown	3 March 2000 (age 26)	0	0	(Solomon Islands Football Federation) Marist
2	DF	John Aeta	2 September 2000 (age 26)	4	0	(Solomon Islands Football Federation) Marist
3	DF	Aengari Gagame	15 April 2000 (age 26)	4	0	(Solomon Islands Football Federation) Solomon Warriors
4	DF	Junior Ashley	24 September 2000 (age 26)	3	0	(Solomon Islands Football Federation) Guadalcanal
5	DF	Raymond Dauabu	19 June 2000 (age 26)	4	0	(Solomon Islands Football Federation) Malaita Kingz
13	DF	Stanley Ryniker	19 September 2001 (age 25)	2	0	(Solomon Islands Football Federation) Koloale FC Honiara
14	DF	Danny Ofeni	12 January 2001 (age 25)	2	0	(Solomon Islands Football Federation) Marist
6	MF	Bobby Ramo	14 April 2000 (age 26)	0	0	(New Zealand Football) Marist
8	MF	Simon Jedzini	11 October 2000 (age 25)	2	0	(Solomon Islands Football Federation) Western United
10	MF	Elis Mana	9 March 2000 (age 26)	4	1	(Solomon Islands Football Federation) Koloale FC Honiara
15	MF	Alfred Elvis	27 July 2000 (age 26)	4	0	(Solomon Islands Football Federation) Western United
16	MF	John Mana	21 January 2001 (age 25)	1	0	(Solomon Islands Football Federation) Hana
17	MF	Michael Lalo	18 January 2001 (age 25)	2	0	(Solomon Islands Football Federation) Guadalcanal
18	MF	Steward Toata	10 January 2001 (age 25)	4	1	(Solomon Islands Football Federation) Marist
19	MF	Richmond Hatarau	3 April 2000 (age 26)	0	0	(Solomon Islands Football Federation) Compol
7	FW	Junior Kaoni	16 June 2000 (age 26)	4	5	(Solomon Islands Football Federation) Solomon Warriors
9	FW	Don Keana	9 September 2000 (age 26)	4	2	(Solomon Islands Football Federation) Marist
11	FW	Ali Mekawir	27 July 2000 (age 26)	4	3	(Solomon Islands Football Federation) Marist
20	FW	Junior Allen	15 December 2001 (age 24)	2	2	(Solomon Islands Football Federation) Marist

== Head-to-head record ==
The following table shows Solomon Islands' head-to-head record in the FIFA U-17 World Cup.

Opponent	Pld	W	D	L	GF	GA	GD	Win %
Italy	1	0	0	1	0	5	−5	0.00
Mexico	1	0	0	1	0	8	−8	0.00
Paraguay	1	0	0	1	0	7	−7	0.00
Total	3	0	0	3	0	20	−20	0.00

== List of coaches ==
- (Solomon Islands) Chris Asipara (2010-2012)
- (Solomon Islands) Jacob Moli (2014-2016)
- (Solomon Islands) Marlon Hoekarawa (2016-2017)
- (Solomon Islands) Stanley Waita (2018-)
