= Leon Kofana =

Solomon Islands footballer (born 2002)

Personal information
- Full name: Leon Kofana
- Date of birth: 20 June 2002 (age 24)
- Place of birth: Honiara, Solomon Islands
- Height: 1.75 m (5 ft 9 in)
- Position: Defender

Team information
- Current team: PNG Hekari

Youth career
- –2019: Henderson Eels
- 2019–2020: Wellington Phoenix

Senior career*
Years	Team	Apps	(Gls)
2020–2025	Henderson Eels		
2026–	PNG Hekari		

International career
2018–2019	Solomon Islands U17	7	(1)
2022–	Solomon Islands	8	(0)
Medal record
Representing Solomon Islands
Pacific Games
Silver medal – second place	2023 Solomon Islands
MSG Prime Minister's Cup
Winner	2023 New Caledonia
Third place	2024 Solomon Islands
- * Club domestic league appearances and goals

Leon Kofana is a Solomon Islands professional footballer who currently plays for PNG Hekari and the Solomon Islands national team.

== Club career ==
As a youth, Kofana played for his school club at White River Community High School. In 2017 the team advanced to the semi-final of the school league before being eliminated by Numbu Christian High School. The following year the team finished third in the league with Kofana anchoring the defense in the bronze final match.

In 2019 he and compatriot Raphael Lea'i received a scholarship to attend Scots College in New Zealand and be part of Wellington Phoenix FC's youth setup. During their first season with the school team, it won its first-ever Premiership title in school history. During his time with Wellington Phoenix, he was unable to appear in competitive matches because of FIFA's regulations regarding players under age eighteen.

Both players were invited back to New Zealand for another year in 2020. However, they decided to remain with their club team in the Solomon Islands. Shortly thereafter, Kofana became a regular starter for Henderson Eels F.C. of the local Telekom S-League and was expected to play a large role in the team's 2020 OFC Champions League campaign. He went on to lead the team to a second-place finish in the league that season.

In March 2020 at age seventeen Kofana and Lea'i achieved what had been a rare feat for players from the Pacific Islands, a trial with Melbourne Victory FC of Australia's A-League. Despite receiving praise from club staff, neither player was signed to a contract following the two-week stint. Several issues, including the ongoing COVID-19 pandemic, added uncertainty to if the players would return.

== International career ==
Following the Solomon Islands championship at the 2017 OFC Youth Futsal Tournament, Kofana represented the nation in futsal at the youth level at the 2018 Summer Youth Olympics in Buenos Aires, Argentina. He scored two goals in the tournament.

Kofana represented the Solomon Islands at the youth level at the 2018 OFC U-16 Championship. He served as captain of the team at the tournament and scored a goal in a 5–0 victory over New Zealand. The victory was the island nation's first over New Zealand at any level in twenty-five years. He went on to represent the nation at the 2019 FIFA U-17 World Cup.

In 2019 he was part of the squad that traveled to Europe for that year's UEFA Development Tournament in Belarus. The Solomon Islands went on to be surprised runners-up in the tournament.

Kofana received his first senior international call-up in February 2020 as part of the provisional squad. In March 2022, he was named to the Solomon Islands senior squad again for the 2022 FIFA World Cup qualification. He went on to make his senior debut on 17 March 2022 in the team's opening match victory over the Cook Islands. Following the team's first-place finish in its group, the Solomon Islands were eventually defeated by New Zealand in the final, costing the Solomon Islands a spot in the inter-confederation play-off.

=== International career statistics ===
As of match played 30 September 2022

Solomon Islands
Year	Apps	Goals
2022	8	0
2023	0	0
Total	8	0

== Honours ==
Solomon Islands

- Pacific Games: Silver Medalist, 2023
- MSG Prime Minister's Cup: 2023; 3rd place, 2024
