= Aaron Cartwright =

New Zealand footballer

Personal information
- Full name: Aaron Cen Cartwright
- Date of birth: 5 July 2008 (age 18)
- Height: 1.78 m (5 ft 10 in)
- Position: Forward

Team information
- Current team: Auckland FC
- Number: 24

Youth career
- –2021: Oakleigh Cannons
- 2021–2026: Melbourne City

Senior career*
Years	Team	Apps	(Gls)
2025–2026	Melbourne City	0	(0)
2026–	Auckland FC	0	(0)

International career^{‡}
2024	Australia U17	0	(0)
2024–	New Zealand U-17	7	(7)
2026–	New Zealand U-20	2	(1)
- * Club domestic league appearances and goals as of 22 July 2026 ‡ National team caps and goals as of 5 September 2026

Aaron Cartwright (born 5 July 2008) is a New Zealand professional footballer who plays as a forward for A-League Men club Auckland FC.

== Club career ==
=== Melbourne City ===
Cartwright joined the Melbourne City Youth from Oakleigh Cannons in 2021. He played in the National Premier Leagues Victoria for Melbourne City, making 15 appearances and scoring four goals during the 2025 season.

On 30 July 2025, Cartwright made his professional debut for Melbourne City, coming off the bench in a 2–0 defeat to APIA Leichhardt in the Australia Cup Round of 32 at Leichhardt Oval. During the 2025–26 season, Cartwright was also named on the bench for Melbourne City in their AFC Champions League Elite clash against Sanfrecce Hiroshima but did not make an appearance.

In the 2026 NPL Victoria season, Cartwright made 13 appearances and scored one goal before departing.

=== Auckland FC ===
On 23 July 2026, Cartwright signed for fellow A-League Men side Auckland FC, signing a scholarship contract with the club ahead of the 2026–27 season.

== International career ==
Cartwright was initially selected for the Australia under-17 soccer team, making appearances for the Joeys before switching his international allegiance to New Zealand, for whom he was eligible through his father.

In 2024, he was named in New Zealand's squad for the 2024 OFC U-16 Men's Championship in Tahiti. He played a key role in New Zealand winning a record ninth title and qualifying for the 2025 FIFA U-17 World Cup, finishing as the tournament's leading goalscorer with seven goals. Cartwright was awarded both the Golden Boot as the tournament's top scorer and the Golden Ball as the tournament's best player.

Cartwright represented New Zealand at the 2025 FIFA U-17 World Cup in Qatar. In New Zealand's final group match at the 2025 FIFA U-17 World Cup, Cartwright assisted William Britton for the equalising goal in the 82nd minute against Austria. However, Austria would go on to win 4–1, eliminating New Zealand from the tournament.

On 21 August 2026, Cartwright was named in the New Zealand U-19 men's squad for the 2026 OFC U-19 Championship.

== Career statistics ==
=== Club ===
As of match played on 23 July 2026.

Club	Season	League			Cup (Note: Includes appearances in the Australia Cup)		Other		Total	
Club	Season	Division	Apps	Goals	Apps	Goals	Apps	Goals	Apps	Goals
Melbourne City Youth	2025	NPL Victoria	15	4	—		0	0	15	4
Melbourne City Youth	2026	NPL Victoria	13	1	—		0	0	13	1
Melbourne City	2025–26	A-League Men	0	0	1	0	0	0	1	0
Melbourne City	Total		0	0	1	0	0	0	29	5
Auckland FC	2026–27	A-League Men	0	0	—		0	0	0	0
Career total			28	5	1	0	0	0	29	5

== Honours ==
New Zealand U16

- OFC U-16 Men's Championship: 2024

Individual

- OFC U-16 Men's Championship Golden Ball: 2024
- OFC U-16 Men's Championship Golden Boot: 2024 (7 goals)
