= John Aeta =

Solomon Islands footballer (born 2000)

Personal information
- Full name: John Aeta
- Date of birth: 2 September 2000 (age 26)
- Place of birth: Solomon Islands
- Position: Defender

Team information
- Current team: Marist
- Number: 15

Youth career
- –2017: Marist

Senior career*
Years	Team	Apps	(Gls)
2017–	Marist		

International career
2017	Solomon Islands U17	4	(0)
2018	Solomon Islands U20	5	(0)
2019	Solomon Islands U23	5	(0)
2017–	Solomon Islands	4	(0)
- * Club domestic league appearances and goals

John Aeta (born 2 September 2000) is a Solomon Islands professional footballer who plays as a defender for Marist. He made his debut for the national team on June 25, 2017, in a 1–1 draw against Fiji.

== International ==
=== U17's ===
Aeta first international experience was with the Solomon Islands national under-17 football team. With the team he played at the 2017 OFC U-17 Championship where he served as the captain of the team. After a victory, a draw and a loss they managed to reach the semi-final. However, they lost the semi-final by three goals to two against New Caledonia. This meant that not the Solomon Islands but New Caledonia qualified for the 2017 FIFA U-17 World Cup for the first time.

=== Senior squad ===
Aeta was named in the Solomon Islands national squad for the first time for two friendly's against Fiji. He made his debut on May 25, 2017, in the first match coming in as a substitute for Robert Laua in a 1–1 draw. After the game the Spanish coach of the team: Felipe Vera-Arango as well as the French head coach of the Fiji national football team: Christophe Gamel said that: 'Aeta is "special Talent" who can play in La Liga with the incredible talent he poses'.
