= Ruben Kutran =

New Caledonian footballer (born 2002)

Personal information
- Full name: Hnasselen Ruben Henri Michel Kutran
- Date of birth: 10 January 2002
- Place of birth: Lifou, New Caledonia
- Date of death: 30 December 2022 (aged 20)
- Place of death: Pessac, France
- Height: 1.75 m (5 ft 9 in)
- Position: Left-back

Youth career
- Païta
- CM Floirac
- 2017–2021: Bordeaux

Senior career*
Years	Team	Apps	(Gls)
2021–2022	Bordeaux II	4	(0)
Total		4	(0)

International career
2018	New Caledonia U16	3	(1)
- * Club domestic league appearances and goals

Hnasselen Ruben Henri Michel Kutran (10 January 2002 – 30 December 2022), known as Ruben Kutran, was a New Caledonian footballer who played as a left-back.

== Club career ==
Born in Lifou, New Caledonia, Kutran began playing football with Païta FC at a young age. At the age of ten, he moved to France, as his mother decided to emigrate to continue her studies. The family settled in Bordeaux, where he played for a number of smaller clubs including CM Floirac.

In July 2017, he signed for the academy of professional side Bordeaux, and rose through the academy to play for the club's under-19 side, before featuring for the club's reserve team in the Championnat National 3. After four appearances with the reserve side, he was diagnosed with a heart condition in 2022, and was forced to retire, leaving Bordeaux in June 2022.

He was offered a coaching position with Bordeaux, but rejected this in favour of an offer from his former club, CM Floirac, to manage their under-13 side, which he started doing in September 2022.

== International career ==
Kutran was called up to the New Caledonia under-16 squad for the 2018 OFC U-16 Championship, which served as qualification for the 2019 FIFA U-17 World Cup. He scored in a 1–1 draw with Samoa, but was unable to help New Caledonia reach the knockout stage of the tournament.

== Death ==
Following his retirement, Kutran did not play football professionally again, but suffered a heart attack while playing with friends. He died on 30 December 2022 in Pessac, France, and was buried in the Cimetière de Floirac on 10 January 2023 - what would have been his twenty-first birthday.

== Personal life ==
Kutran's two younger brothers, twins Baptiste and Nicolas, are also footballers, and both currently play for Bordeaux.

== Career statistics ==
=== Club ===
Appearances and goals by club, season and competition
Club	Season	League			Cup		Other		Total	
Club	Season	Division	Apps	Goals	Apps	Goals	Apps	Goals	Apps	Goals
Bordeaux II	2021–22	Championnat National 3	4	0	—		0	0	4	0
Career total			4	0	0	0	0	0	4	0
