= Ludovic Graugnard =

French football manager

Personal information
- Date of birth: 25 October 1977 (age 49)
- Place of birth: Arles, France

Team information
- Current team: Tahiti; Tahiti U17

Managerial career
- Years: Team
- 2010–2014: A.S. Dragon
- 2014–2016: Tahiti U17
- 2015–2018: Tahiti

Ludovic Graugnard (born 25 October 1977) is a French football manager who managed both the Tahiti national team and the Tahiti national under-17 team.
