= Joris Kenon =

New Caledonian association football player (born 1998)

Personal information
- Full name: Joris Gabriel Djüëla Kenon
- Date of birth: 29 January 1998 (age 28)
- Place of birth: New Caledonia
- Position: Midfielder

Team information
- Current team: Cognac

Youth career
- 2009–2015: OMS Païta
- 2015–2016: Laval

Senior career*
Years	Team	Apps	(Gls)
2016–2019	Laval B	48	(2)
2019–2021	USSA Vertou	19	(3)
2021–	Cognac	21	(0)

International career^{‡}
2015	New Caledonia U17	7	(5)
2022–	New Caledonia	4	(0)
- * Club domestic league appearances and goals as of 4 June 2022 ‡ National team caps and goals as of 10 October 2024

Joris Gabriel Djüëla Kenon (born 29 January 1998) is a New Caledonian footballer who plays as a midfielder for French Championnat National 3 club Cognac and the New Caledonia national team.

== Club career ==
Kenon started his career with Laval B.

== International career ==
In February 2022, Kenon was named in the New Caledonia team for 2022 FIFA World Cup qualification matches.

== Career statistics ==
=== International ===
As of 10 October 2024

Appearances and goals by national team and year
National team	Year	Apps	Goals
New Caledonia	2022	3	0
New Caledonia	2024	1	0
Total		4	0
