= Malapoa College =

Coordinates: 17.7242°S 168.3041°E

Malapoa College, originally British Secondary School (BSS), is an English-language secondary school in Port Vila, Vanuatu. Originally a school for dependants of employees of the pre-independence Vanuatu government and foreign expatriates, it opened in 1966.

As of 2016 it had 755 students. A new school was scheduled to open in 2018. The new school had a cost of 1.2 billion Vanuatu vatus. Yanjian Group designed the school facilities, with China Northeast Architectural Design and Research Institute Co Ltd. (CSCECNEI; Chinese: 中国建筑东北设计研究院有限公司) having additional input. The Chinese government funded the construction of the school.

== Campus ==
The 12,343.7-square-metre (132,866 sq ft) facility has an administration area, an academic area, and a residential area. The administration building is at the main entrance.

The main academic area has three classroom buildings, two science buildings, a library building, and an employee building. The academic buildings have seven classrooms and the science buildings have eight laboratories for science classes. All of these buildings are two storeys tall.

The residential area has two student dormitories, a residential facility for teachers, a canteen, and a recreation building for day students. The teacher residence building has two storeys. Each student dormitory, one for boys and one for girls, may house up to 500 students and has three storeys. The playground is in the residential section.

== Notable alumni ==
- Merilyn Tahi – women's rights activist
