= 1991 OFC U-17 Championship =

1991 OFC Under-17 Football Championship
Tournament details
- Host country: New Zealand
- Dates: 11–21 January
- Teams: 3 (from 1 confederation)
- Venue: 1 (in 1 host city)

Final positions
- Champions: Australia (4th title)
- Runners-up: New Zealand

Tournament statistics
- Matches played: 6
- Goals scored: 28 (4.67 per match)
- Top scorer(s): (Australia) Vas Kalogeracos (Australia) Alex Kratzoglou (New Zealand) Gary Kingi (4 goals)

The 1991 OFC U-17 Championship was the 4th edition of the OFC's under-17 Championship. It was held in Napier, New Zealand. The tournament was played as a single group, with all teams playing each other twice.

The winning team qualified for the 1991 FIFA U-17 World Championship

Australia won their fourth title from four attempts, finishing the tournament undefeated.

== Teams ==
The tournament was contested by three teams.

- Australia
- Fiji
- New Zealand

== Results ==
Pos	Team	Pld	W	D	L	GF	GA	GD	Pts	Qualification
1	Australia	4	3	1	0	15	4	+11	7	Qualification for 1991 FIFA U-17 World Championship
2	New Zealand (H)	4	2	1	1	9	3	+6	5	
3	Fiji	4	0	0	4	4	21	−17	0	

Source: RSSSF
(H) Hosts

== Matches ==
11 January 1991

Australia	6–1	Fiji
Kalogeracos 2', 11', 22'; Carbone 17' (pen.); Campagna; Kiratzoglou		Samusamuvodre

Park Island, Napier

13 January 1991

New Zealand	1–1	Australia
Kingi 18'		Kalogeracos 15'

Park Island, Napier

15 January 1991

New Zealand	5–1	Fiji
Fallon; Kingi; Beldham		Goal

Park Island, Napier

17 January 1991

Australia	7–2	Fiji
Campagna 1'; Kiratzoglou 2', 18', 70'; Healey 19', 23'; Usalj 90'		Pillay 38'; Yakub 67'

Park Island, Napier

19 January 1991

New Zealand	3–0	Fiji
Beldham; Kingi; Norfolk

Park Island, Napier

21 January 1991

New Zealand	0–1	Australia
		Campagna 70'

Park Island, Napier

== Top scorers ==
4 goals

(Australia) Vas Kalogeracos

(Australia) Alex Kiratzoglou

(New Zealand) Gary Kingi

3 goals

(Australia) Lorenzo Campagna
