= 2015 OFC U-17 Championship =

Soccer tournament in Oceania

Tournament details
- Host countries: American Samoa; Samoa
- Dates: 13–26 January
- Teams: 11 (from 1 confederation)
- Venue: 3 (in 2 host cities)

Final positions
- Champions: New Zealand (6th title)
- Runners-up: Tahiti
- Third place: Vanuatu
- Fourth place: New Caledonia

Tournament statistics
- Matches played: 29
- Goals scored: 178 (6.14 per match)
- Top scorer(s): (Solomon Islands) Larry Zama (13 goals)
- Best player: (New Zealand) Logan Rogerson
- Best goalkeeper: (French Polynesia) Vaiarii Halligan
- Fair play award: American Samoa

The 2015 OFC U-17 Championship was the 16th edition of the biennial international youth football tournament organized by the Oceania Football Confederation (OFC) for players aged 17 and below. The tournament was held in American Samoa and Samoa from 13 to 26 January 2015.

New Zealand won the tournament and qualified as the OFC representative for the 2015 FIFA U-17 World Cup in Chile.

== Participating teams ==
All 11 eligible teams participated in the tournament. It is only the second time all 11 OFC member associations have entered an Oceania competition since 2006.

- American Samoa (co-hosts)
- Cook Islands
- Fiji
- New Caledonia
- New Zealand
- Papua New Guinea
- Samoa (co-hosts)
- Solomon Islands
- Tahiti
- Tonga
- Vanuatu

== Venues ==
Samoa
Apia
J. S. Blatter Complex
Capacity: 3,500
2015 OFC U-17 Championship is located in Samoa
American Samoa
Pago Pago	Tafuna
Pago Park Soccer Stadium	Kanana Fou Theological Seminary
Capacity: 2,000	Capacity: —

== Group stage ==
The draw of the tournament was held on 18 November 2014, with each group played as a round-robin tournament. The top two teams from each group advance to the semi-finals.

=== Group A ===
All matches were played in Samoa.

Pos	Team	Pld	W	D	L	GF	GA	GD	Pts	Qualification
1	New Zealand	5	5	0	0	29	5	+24	15	Advance to knock-out stage
2	New Caledonia	5	4	0	1	22	8	+14	12	Advance to knock-out stage
3	Papua New Guinea	5	2	1	2	9	5	+4	7	
4	Fiji	5	2	1	2	10	12	−2	7	
5	Samoa (H)	5	1	0	4	7	22	−15	3	
6	Cook Islands	5	0	0	5	2	27	−25	0	

Source: OFC
(H) Hosts
13 January 2015
14:00 UTC+12

Samoa	0–3	New Caledonia
	Report	Kaï 24'; Boucheron 56'; Kaudre 80'

J. S. Blatter Complex, Apia
Referee: Averii Jacques (Tahiti)
13 January 2015
16:30 UTC+12

Cook Islands	0–3	Papua New Guinea
	Report	Kambula 13'; Tokwakwasi 75'; Tupani 90'

J. S. Blatter Complex, Apia
Referee: Ichikawa Polovili (Tonga)
13 January 2015
19:00 UTC+12

Fiji	0–6	New Zealand
	Report	McGarry 12', 33'; Rogerson 17', 55'; Mata 69' (pen.); Probert 90+1' (pen.)

J. S. Blatter Complex, Apia
Referee: Kader Zitouni (Tahiti)

15 January 2015
14:00 UTC+12

Papua New Guinea	0–0	Fiji
	Report

J. S. Blatter Complex, Apia
Referee: Gerald Oiaka (Solomon Islands)
15 January 2015
16:30 UTC+12

New Zealand	9–1	Samoa
4' (o.g.); Kiore 16'; Anderson 28', 80' (pen.); Woodlock 45+1'; Rogerson 63', 70', 87'; Probert 84'	Report	Frank Mariner 90'

J. S. Blatter Complex, Apia
Referee: Ichikawa Polovili (Tonga)
15 January 2015
19:00 UTC+12

New Caledonia	8–1	Cook Islands
Poanoui 4', 55'; Guseal 5'; Boucheron 29', 90+2'; 50' (o.g.); Kenon 57'; Betoulle 76'	Report	Mariri 10'

J. S. Blatter Complex, Apia
Referee: Robinson Banga (Vanuatu)

17 January 2015
14:00 UTC+12

New Caledonia	5–1	Fiji
Kenon 29'; Kaï 42'; Hnagone 44'; Akapo 66'; 82' (o.g.)	Report	Batiratu 12'

J. S. Blatter Complex, Apia
Referee: Kader Zitouni (Tahiti)
17 January 2015
16:30 UTC+12

Papua New Guinea	0–3	New Zealand
	Report	Anderson 32'; Mata 65'; Kiore 80' (pen.)

J. S. Blatter Complex, Apia
Referee: Robinson Banga (Vanuatu)
17 January 2015
19:00 UTC+12

Cook Islands	1–5	Samoa
Koiatu 29'	Report	Sofala 8'; 24' (o.g.); Wensley 55', 61'; Mariner 68'

J. S. Blatter Complex, Apia
Referee: Gerald Oiaka (Solomon Islands)

19 January 2015
14:00 UTC+12

New Zealand	5–4	New Caledonia
Rogerson 12', 18', 60'; Probert 20'; Johnson 57'	Report	Hnagone 11'; Boucheron 45+1', 50'; Kenon 78' (pen.)

J. S. Blatter Complex, Apia
Referee: Gerald Oiaka (Solomon Islands)
19 January 2015
16:30 UTC+12

Fiji	5–0	Cook Islands
Batiratu 24', 59', 77'; Reddy 37'; Catarogo 90'	Report

J. S. Blatter Complex, Apia
Referee: Nelson Sogo (Solomon Islands)
19 January 2015
19:00 UTC+12

Samoa	0–5	Papua New Guinea
	Report	Bade 59', 89'; Kambula 63'; Gubag 87'; Tupani 90'

J. S. Blatter Complex, Apia
Referee: Ichikawa Polowi (Tonga)

21 January 2015
14:00 UTC+12

New Zealand	6–0	Cook Islands
Ceci 4'; Woodlock 45+2', 56', 66', 72'; Skeens 82'	Report

J. S. Blatter Complex, Apia
Referee: Nelson Sogo (Solomon Islands)
21 January 2015
16:30 UTC+12

Fiji	4–1	Samoa
Khan 29', 33', 50'; Lotu-I'iga 48' (o.g.)	Report	Malo 35'

J. S. Blatter Complex, Apia
Referee: Robinson Banga (Vanuatu)
21 January 2015
19:00 UTC+12

Papua New Guinea	1–2	New Caledonia
Bade 76'	Report	Akapo 51' (pen.); Kenon 56'

J. S. Blatter Complex, Apia
Referee: Kader Zitouni (Tahiti)

=== Group B ===
All matches were played in American Samoa.

Pos	Team	Pld	W	D	L	GF	GA	GD	Pts	Qualification
1	Tahiti	4	4	0	0	29	0	+29	12	Advance to knock-out stage
2	Vanuatu	4	3	0	1	24	3	+21	9	Advance to knock-out stage
3	Solomon Islands	4	2	0	2	24	6	+18	6	
4	Tonga	4	1	0	3	3	32	−29	3	
5	American Samoa (H)	4	0	0	4	0	39	−39	0	

Source: OFC
(H) Hosts
13 January 2015
13:00 UTC−11

American Samoa	0–13	Vanuatu
	Report	Worworbu 8', 62', 71', 83'; Obed 22'; Joshua 38'; Sau 51', 53', 67'; Massing 53' (pen.); Unuga 73' (pen.), 75'; Wilkins 90+1'

Pago Park Soccer Stadium, Pago Pago
Referee: Anna-Marie Keighley (New Zealand)
13 January 2015
15:30 UTC−11

Solomon Islands	10–1	Tonga
Hou 19', 58'; Zama 20', 53', 78', 85'; Raramo 31', 60'; Atu 75'; Jirah 89'	Report	Vea 14'

Pago Park Soccer Stadium, Pago Pago
Referee: Salesh Chand (Fiji)

15 January 2015
13:00 UTC−11

Vanuatu	9–0	Tonga
Worworbu 1', 31', 65'; Sau 50', 64', 67'; Massing 52'; Edison 62'; Wilkins 82'	Report

Pago Park Soccer Stadium, Pago Pago
Referee: Anna-Marie Keighley (New Zealand)
15 January 2015
15:30 UTC−11

American Samoa	0–11	Tahiti
	Report	Maihi 4', 17', 29', 38', 43'; Wong 40'; Siejidr 45+1'; Salem 51', 72'; Nordman 58', 79'

Pago Park Soccer Stadium, Pago Pago
Referee: Hillary Any (Papua New Guinea)

17 January 2015
13:00 UTC−11

Tonga	0–13	Tahiti
	Report	Nordman 10', 75'; Kohumoetini 13', 58'; Siejidr 24'; Maihi 38', 41', 48', 54', 57'; Tenuanua 63'; 70' (o.g.); Heitaa 77'

Pago Park Soccer Stadium, Pago Pago
Referee: Salesh Chand (Fiji)
17 January 2015
15:30 UTC−11

Vanuatu	2–1	Solomon Islands
Worworbu 6'; Wilkins 62' (pen.)	Report	Zama 43'

Pago Park Soccer Stadium, Pago Pago
Referee: Averii Jacques (Tahiti)

19 January 2015
13:00 UTC−11

Tahiti	3–0	Solomon Islands
Siejidr 35'; Maihi 45+4' (pen.); 59' (o.g.)	Report

Pago Park Soccer Stadium, Pago Pago
Referee: Anna-Marie Keighley (New Zealand)
19 January 2015
15:30 UTC−11

Tonga	2–0	American Samoa
Muli 75'; Vea 90+8'	Report

Pago Park Soccer Stadium, Pago Pago
Referee: Hillary Ani (Papua New Guinea)

21 January 2015
13:00 UTC−11

Solomon Islands	13–0	American Samoa
Zama 9', 27', 39', 45+6', 52', 68', 88', 90'; Maeta 42', 70'; Hou 72'; Toata 76'; Jirah 81'	Report

Kanana Fou Theological Seminary, Pago Pago
Referee: Hillary Ani (Papua New Guinea)
21 January 2015
15:30 UTC−11

Tahiti	2–0	Vanuatu
Salem 40'; 73' (o.g.)	Report

Kanana Fou Theological Seminary, Pago Pago
Referee: Anna-Marie Keighley (New Zealand)

Note: The last round of matches were moved from Pago Park Soccer Stadium to Kanana Fou Theological Seminary due to wet weather and deteriorating pitch conditions.

== Knock-out stage ==
All matches were played in American Samoa.

=== Bracket ===
Semi-finals
24 January 2015
New Zealand	5
Vanuatu	1
24 January 2015
Tahiti	3
New Caledonia	2

Final
26 January 2015
New Zealand (p)	1 (5)
Tahiti	1 (4)
Third place
26 January 2015
Vanuatu	6
New Caledonia	0

=== Semi-finals ===
24 January 2015
13:00 UTC−11

New Zealand	5−1	Vanuatu
McGarry 4'; Rogerson 21', 56'; Probert 83' (pen.); Wilson 90+3'	Report	Johnson 67' (o.g.)

Pago Park Soccer Stadium, Pago Pago
Referee: Kader Zitouni (Tahiti)
24 January 2015
15:30 UTC−11

Tahiti	3−2	New Caledonia
Maihi 37'; Salem 50', 81'	Report	Hnagone 18'; Kenon 56'

Pago Park Soccer Stadium, Pago Pago
Referee: Salesh Chand (Fiji)

=== Third place match ===
26 January 2015
13:00 UTC−11

Vanuatu	6–0	New Caledonia
Sylvain Worworbu 3', 53', 90+1'; Sam Tiaou 45+1' (o.g.); Ronaldo Wilkins 55'; Xavier Jimmy 84'	Report

Pago Park Soccer Stadium, Pago Pago
Referee: Averii Jacques (Tahiti)

=== Final ===
No extra time was played. New Zealand won the fifth title in a row and qualified for the 2015 FIFA U-17 World Cup, while Tahiti lost for the final for the fourth time in five years.

26 January 2015
15:30 UTC−11

New Zealand	1–1	Tahiti
Logan Rogerson 60'	Report	Honoarii Kohumoetini 81'
Penalties
Louie Mills (penalty scored); William Jones (penalty scored); Oliver Ceci (penalty scored); Benjamin Mata (penalty scored); Connor Probert (penalty scored)	5–4	(penalty missed) Michel Maihi; (penalty scored) Rayan Petitgas; (penalty scored) Marc Siejidr; (penalty scored) Heirauarii Salem; (penalty scored) Honoarii Kohumoetini

Pago Park Soccer Stadium, Pago Pago
Referee: Nelson Sogo (Solomon Islands)

== Awards ==
The Golden Ball Award is awarded to the most outstanding player of the tournament. The Golden Glove Award is awarded to the best goalkeeper of the tournament. The Golden Boot Award is awarded to the top scorer of the tournament. The Fair Play Award is awarded to the team with the best disciplinary record at the tournament.

Award	Recipient
Golden Ball	(New Zealand) Logan Rogerson
Golden Glove	(French Polynesia) Vaiarii Halligan
Golden Boot	(Solomon Islands) Larry Zama (13 goals)
Fair Play Award	American Samoa

== Goalscorers ==
13 goals

- (Solomon Islands) Larry Zama

12 goals

- (French Polynesia) Michel Maihi

11 goals

- (New Zealand) Logan Rogerson
- (Vanuatu) Sylvain Worworbu

6 goals

- (Vanuatu) Abednigo Sau

5 goals

- (New Caledonia) Henri Boucheron
- (New Caledonia) Joris Kenon
- (New Zealand) Jamie Woodlock
- (French Polynesia) Heirauarii Salem

4 goals

- (Fiji) Simeli Batiratu
- (New Zealand) Connor Probert
- (French Polynesia) Rainui Nordman
- (Vanuatu) Ronaldo Wilkins

3 goals

- (Fiji) Fazeem Khan
- (New Caledonia) Joseph Hnagone
- (New Zealand) Jack Anderson
- (New Zealand) James McGarry
- (Papua New Guinea) Oswald Bade
- (Solomon Islands) Junior Hou
- (French Polynesia) Honoarii Kohumoetini
- (French Polynesia) Marc Siejidr

2 goals

- (New Caledonia) Marino Akapo
- (New Caledonia) Nelson Kaï
- (New Caledonia) Etienne Poanoui
- (New Zealand) Ben Kiore
- (New Zealand) Benjamin Mata
- (Papua New Guinea) Brendon Kambula
- (Papua New Guinea) Freddy Tupani
- (Samoa) Samualu Malo
- (Samoa) Frank Mariner
- (Samoa) David Wensley
- (Solomon Islands) Hendrick Jirah
- (Solomon Islands) Philip Maeta
- (Solomon Islands) Richard Raramo
- (Tonga) Soakai Vea
- (Vanuatu) Frederick Massing
- (Vanuatu) Max Unuga

1 goal

- (Cook Islands) Samuel Koiatu
- (Cook Islands) Rouruina Mariri
- (Fiji) France Catarogo
- (Fiji) Muni Reddy
- (New Caledonia) Maxime Betoulle
- (New Caledonia) Jimmy Guseal
- (New Caledonia) Jean-Marc Kaudre
- (New Zealand) Oliver Ceci
- (New Zealand) Luke Johnson
- (New Zealand) Sean Skeens
- (New Zealand) Sam Wilson
- (Papua New Guinea) Stahl Gubag
- (Papua New Guinea) Martin Tokwakwasi
- (Samoa) Mose Sofala
- (Solomon Islands) Kaliz Atu
- (Solomon Islands) Benjimin Toata
- (French Polynesia) Mauri Heitaa
- (French Polynesia) Joachim Tenuanua
- (French Polynesia) Keali Wong
- (Tonga) Aisea Muli
- (Vanuatu) William Edison
- (Vanuatu) Xavier Jimmy
- (Vanuatu) Simeon Joshua
- (Vanuatu) Nicky Obed

Own goals

- (Cook Islands) (2: 1 against (New Caledonia) and 1 against (Samoa) )
- (Samoa) (2: Bronson Lotu-I'iga against (Fiji) and 1 against (New Zealand) )
- (Fiji) (1 against (New Caledonia) )
- (New Caledonia) (Sam Tiaou against (Vanuatu) )
- (New Zealand) (Luke Johnson against (Vanuatu) )
- (Solomon Islands) (1 against (French Polynesia) )
- (Tonga) (1 against (French Polynesia) )
- (Vanuatu) (1 against (French Polynesia) )
