= Tahiti national under-17 football team =

National U-17 team of Tahiti

Tahiti U17
- Nickname: Tama Ura
- Association: Tahitian Football Federation
- Confederation: OFC (Oceania)
- Head coach: (France) Ludovic Graugnard
- Captain: Vaianui Drollet
- Top scorer: Michel Maihi (11)
- FIFA code: TAH
First colours	Second colours

First international
- Australia 9 - 0 Tahiti (French Polynesia) (Auckland, New Zealand; December 1983)

Biggest win
- (French Polynesia) Tahiti 15 - 0 Tonga (New Caledonia; April 3, 2005)

Biggest defeat
- Australia 9 - 0 Tahiti (French Polynesia) (Auckland, New Zealand; December 1983); Australia 9 - 0 Tahiti (French Polynesia) (Sunshine Coast, Australia; February 17, 2003)

World Cup
- Appearances: 0

OFC Under-17 Championship
- Appearances: 14 (first in 1983)
- Best result: Runners-up (2007, 2009, 2011, 2015)

The Tahiti national under-17 football team is the national U-17 team of Tahiti and is controlled by the Tahitian Football Federation. They currently compete in the Tahiti First Division.

== Competition Record ==
=== FIFA U-17 World Cup record ===
FIFA U-17 World Cup record
Year	Round	Pld	W	D	L	GF	GA	GD	Pts
(China) 1985	Did not qualify								
(Canada) 1987 to (Italy) 1991	Did not participate								
(Japan) 1993	Did not qualify								
(Ecuador) 1995	Did not participate								
(Egypt) 1997 to (Mexico) 2011	Did not qualify								
(United Arab Emirates) 2013	Did not participate								
(Chile) 2015 to (Qatar) 2025	Did not qualify								
(Qatar) 2026	To be determined								
Total	-	0	0	0	0	0	0	0	0

=== OFC U-17 Championship record ===
The OFC U-17 Championship is a tournament held once every two years to decide the only two qualification spots for the Oceania Football Confederation (OFC) and its representatives at the FIFA U-17 World Cup.

OFC U-17 Championship
Year	Round	Pld	W	D	L	GF	GA	GD	Pts
(New Zealand) 1983	6th place	5	0	2	3	3	17	-14	2
(Chinese Taipei) 1986	Did not participate	-	-	-	-	-	-	-	-
(Australia) 1989	Did not participate	-	-	-	-	-	-	-	-
(New Zealand) 1991	Did not participate	-	-	-	-	-	-	-	-
(New Zealand) 1993	Group Stage	2	0	0	2	1	3	-2	0
(Vanuatu) 1995	Did not participate	-	-	-	-	-	-	-	-
(New Zealand) 1997	Group Stage	3	1	0	2	10	9	+1	3
(Fiji) 1999	Group Stage	4	2	0	2	11	9	+2	6
(Samoa) & (Vanuatu) 2001	Group Stage	4	1	2	1	1	2	-1	5
(American Samoa) & (Australia) & (New Caledonia) 2003	Group Stage	5	1	0	4	7	22	-15	3
(New Caledonia) 2005	Group Stage	3	1	0	2	16	7	+9	3
(French Polynesia) 2007	Runners-up	3	0	2	1	1	2	-1	2
(New Zealand) 2009	Runners-up	3	2	0	1	9	5	+4	6
(New Zealand) 2011	Runners-up	5	4	0	1	14	4	+10	12
(Samoa) & (Vanuatu) 2013	Did not participate	-	-	-	-	-	-	-	-
(American Samoa) & (Samoa) 2015	Runners-up	6	5	1	0	33	3	+30	16
(Samoa) & (French Polynesia) 2017	Group Stage	3	1	1	1	3	3	0	3
(Tonga) & (Solomon Islands) 2018	3rd place	5	4	0	1	13	7	+6	12
(Fiji) 2023	3rd place	5	4	1	0	17	2	+15	13
Total	Runners-up	56	26	9	21	139	95	+44	86

== Current squad ==
The following players were called up for the 2018 OFC U-16 Championship from 9 to 22 September 2018.

Caps and goals as of 22 September 2018 after the game against Fiji.

No.	Pos.	Player	Date of birth (age)	Caps	Goals	Club
1	GK	Josselin Capel	1 July 2002 (age 24)	3	0	(French Football Federation) AS Saint-Étienne
16	GK	Terainui Tetuanui	26 February 2003 (age 23)	2	0	(Tahitian Football Federation) AS Tefana
2	DF	Matatini Vernaudon	14 August 2002 (age 24)	5	0	(Tahitian Football Federation) AS Vénus
3	DF	Noah Aussillous	12 May 2002 (age 24)	4	0	(Tahitian Football Federation) AS Tefana
4	DF	Manatini Sienne	26 June 2002 (age 24)	4	0	(Tahitian Football Federation) AS JT
5	DF	Manarii Vahirua	30 January 2003 (age 23)	5	0	(Tahitian Football Federation) AS Central Sport
18	DF	Jeff Heuhea	1 February 2002 (age 24)	2	0	(Tahitian Football Federation) AS Taiarapu
19	DF	Keanu Vernaudon	18 October 2002 (age 23)	5	0	(Tahitian Football Federation) AS Tefana
6	MF	Sofiene Boukrouma	10 January 2003 (age 23)	5	0	(Tahitian Football Federation) AS Tefana
7	MF	Jason Jones	9 June 2003 (age 23)	4	0	(Tahitian Football Federation) AS Tefana
8	MF	Tekai Sangue	17 June 2003 (age 23)	3	3	(Tahitian Football Federation) AS Teva
10	MF	Tehauarii Holozet	3 June 2002 (age 24)	4	0	(Tahitian Football Federation) AS Tefana
11	MF	Clément Tehahe	18 June 2003 (age 23)	3	0	(Tahitian Football Federation) AS Taiarapu
14	MF	Heihau Hanere	5 July 2003 (age 23)	5	1	(Tahitian Football Federation) AS Tiare Tahiti
15	MF	Takai Schmit	7 February 2002 (age 24)	2	0	(Tahitian Football Federation) AS Tefana
20	MF	Heeali Amaru	23 January 2002 (age 24)	0	0	(French Football Federation) AS Saint-Étienne
9	FW	Louis Gitton	2 April 2002 (age 24)	5	4	(Tahitian Football Federation) AS Vénus
13	FW	Denji Kaiha	15 June 2002 (age 24)	3	3	(Tahitian Football Federation) AS OM
14	FW	Ariiura Labaste	26 July 2002 (age 24)	5	2	(Tahitian Football Federation) AS Vénus
