= 2005 OFC U-17 Championship =

Championnat d'Océanie de football des moins de 17 ans 2005

Tournament details
- Host country: New Caledonia
- Dates: 2-15 April 2005
- Teams: 9 (from 1 confederation)

Final positions
- Champions: Australia (10th title)
- Runners-up: Vanuatu
- Third place: Solomon Islands
- Fourth place: New Caledonia

Tournament statistics
- Matches played: 20

The 2005 OFC Under-17 Tournament was an association football competition in Oceania. It was the 11th edition of the OFC Under 17 Qualifying Tournament, Nine teams participated in the tournament.

The winning side qualified for the 2005 FIFA U-17 World Championship in Peru.

Australia won their tenth (and fourth consecutive) title after beating Vanuatu 1–0 in the final. This also marked Australia's final participation (and championship) in an OFC U-17 men's event as they would become members of the AFC starting the next year (2006).

== Qualification ==
All member teams qualified automatically. New Zealand withdrew before the tournament began on March 3, citing financial reasons.

Samoa and American Samoa also withdrew.

The following teams participated in the tournament:

- Australia
- Cook Islands
- Fiji
- New Caledonia
- Papua New Guinea
- Solomon Islands
- Tahiti
- Tonga
- Vanuatu

== Group stage ==
=== Group A ===
Pos	Team	Pld	W	D	L	GF	GA	GD	Pts	Qualification
1	Australia (A)	3	3	0	0	35	0	+35	9	Advance to semi-finals
2	Vanuatu (A)	3	2	0	1	22	5	+17	6	Advance to semi-finals
3	Tahiti	3	1	0	2	16	7	+9	3	
4	Tonga	3	0	0	3	0	61	−61	0	

(A) Advance to a further round
3 April 2005

Australia	4–0	Vanuatu

3 April 2005

Tahiti	15–0	Tonga

5 April 2005

Vanuatu	20–0	Tonga

7 April 2005

Tahiti	0–5	Australia

9 April 2005

Vanuatu	2–1	Tahiti

11 April 2005

Tonga	0–26	Australia

=== Group B ===
Pos	Team	Pld	W	D	L	GF	GA	GD	Pts	Qualification
1	New Caledonia (A)	4	3	0	1	11	6	+5	9	Advance to semi-finals
2	Solomon Islands (A)	4	2	2	0	17	5	+12	8	Advance to semi-finals
3	Fiji	4	2	1	1	9	6	+3	7	
4	Papua New Guinea	4	1	1	2	10	11	−1	4	
5	Cook Islands	4	0	0	4	0	19	−19	0	

(A) Advance to a further round
2 April 2005

Fiji	5–2	Papua New Guinea

2 April 2005

Solomon Islands	5–0	New Caledonia

5 April 2005

Fiji	2–2	Solomon Islands

5 April 2005

New Caledonia	6–0	Cook Islands

7 April 2005

New Caledonia	3–1	Papua New Guinea

7 April 2005

Cook Islands	0–7	Solomon Islands

9 April 2005

Solomon Islands	3–3	Papua New Guinea

9 April 2005

Fiji	2–0	Cook Islands

11 April 2005

Cook Islands	0–4	Papua New Guinea

11 April 2005

New Caledonia	2–0	Fiji

== Knockout stage ==
=== Semi-finals ===
13 April 2005

Australia	2–0	Solomon Islands

13 April 2005

New Caledonia	1–4	Vanuatu

=== Third place playoff ===
15 April 2005

Solomon Islands	3–1	New Caledonia

=== Final ===
15 April 2005

Australia	1–0	Vanuatu

Australia qualified for the U-17 World Cup.
