= New Zealand men's national under-17 football team =

New Zealand U17
- Nickname: Junior All Whites
- Association: New Zealand Football
- Confederation: OFC (Oceania)
- Head coach: Martin Bullock
- Captain: Marley Leuluai
- Most caps: Ian Hogg (21)
- Top scorer: Kosta Barbarouses (16)
- FIFA code: NZL
First colours	Second colours

First international
- New Zealand 1–0 Chinese Taipei (Auckland, New Zealand; 8 December 1983)

Biggest win
- Tonga 0–13 New Zealand (Maroochydore, Australia; 20 February 2003)

Biggest defeat
- New Zealand 0–13 Spain (Ismailia, Egypt; 11 September 1997)

FIFA U-17 World Cup
- Appearances: 12 (first in 1997)
- Best result: Round of 16 (2009, 2011, 2015)

OFC U-16 Men's Championship
- Appearances: 17 (first in 1983)
- Best result: Champions (1997, 2007, 2009, 2011, 2013, 2015, 2017, 2018, 2023, 2024, 2025)

The New Zealand under-17 football team, more commonly known as the Junior All Whites, is controlled by New Zealand Football and represents New Zealand in international Under 17 or youth football competitions.

New Zealand was the host nation for the 1999 FIFA U-17 World Championship.

== Competition record ==
=== OFC U-17 Championship ===
The OFC Under 17 Qualifying Tournament is a tournament held once every two years to decide the only two qualification spots for the Oceania Football Confederation (OFC) and its representatives at the FIFA U-17 World Cup. Since 2018 it has been renamed as the OFC U-16 Championship and held in the year preceding the U-17 World Cup.

OFC U-17 Championship / OFC U-16 Championship record
Year	Round	Position	Pld	W	D*	L	GF	GA
(New Zealand) 1983	Runners-up	2nd	5	3	1	1	7	2
(Chinese Taipei) 1986	Runners-up	2nd	4	2	2	0	3	1
(Australia) 1989	Runners-up	2nd	4	3	0	1	18	5
(New Zealand) 1991	Runners-up	2nd	4	2	1	1	9	3
(Solomon Islands) 1993	Third place	3rd	3	2	0	1	16	3
(Vanuatu) 1995	Runners-up	2nd	4	2	1	1	6	3
(New Zealand) 1997	Champions	1st	5	5	0	0	15	1
(Fiji) 1999	Did not enter							
(Samoa) (Vanuatu) 2001	Runners-up	2nd	6	4	0	2	14	10
(American Samoa) (Australia) (New Caledonia) 2003	Group stage	5th	5	2	2	1	19	4
(New Caledonia) 2005	Withdrew							
(French Polynesia) 2007	Champions	1st	3	3	0	0	9	2
(New Zealand) 2009	Champions	1st	3	3	0	0	7	0
(New Zealand) 2011	Champions	1st	5	5	0	0	15	1
(Vanuatu) 2013	Champions	1st	5	5	0	0	23	3
(American Samoa) (Samoa) 2015	Champions	1st	7	6	1	0	36	7
(French Polynesia) 2017	Champions	1st	5	5	0	0	28	2
(Solomon Islands) 2018	Champions	1st	5	3	1	1	16	9
(Fiji) 2023	Champions	1st	5	5	0	0	20	3
(French Polynesia) 2024	Champions	1st	5	5	0	0	31	2
(Solomon Islands) 2025	Champions	1st	5	4	1	0	17	0
(Papua New Guinea) 2026	Champions	1st	5	5	0	0	26	2
Total	12 titles	20/22	93	74	10	9	333	61

=== FIFA U-17 World Cup ===
FIFA U-17 World Cup record
Year	Round	Pos	Pld	W	D*	L	GF	GA	Squad
(China) 1985	Did not qualify								
(Canada) 1987	Did not qualify								
(Scotland) 1989	Did not qualify								
(Italy) 1991	Did not qualify								
(Japan) 1993	Did not qualify								
(Ecuador) 1995	Did not qualify								
(Egypt) 1997	Group stage	16th	3	0	0	3	0	22	Squad
(New Zealand) 1999	Group stage	11th	3	1	0	2	3	8	Squad
(Trinidad and Tobago) 2001	Did not qualify								
(Finland) 2003	Did not qualify								
(Peru) 2005	Withdrew								
(South Korea) 2007	Group stage	24th	3	0	0	3	0	13	Squad
(Nigeria) 2009	Round of 16	16th	4	0	3	1	3	8	Squad
(Mexico) 2011	Round of 16	13th	4	1	1	2	4	8	Squad
(United Arab Emirates) 2013	Group stage	24th	3	0	0	3	0	11	Squad
(Chile) 2015	Round of 16	15th	4	1	1	2	3	8	Squad
(India) 2017	Group stage	17th	3	0	1	2	4	8	Squad
(Brazil) 2019	Group stage	17th	3	1	0	2	2	5	Squad
(Indonesia) 2023	Group stage	22nd	3	0	0	3	1	10	Squad
(Qatar) 2025	Group stage	43rd	3	0	0	3	3	10	Squad
(Qatar) 2026	In progress	TBD	1	0	0	1	0	3	Squad
Total:12/21	Round of 16	13th	37	4	6	27	23	114	—

=== 1997 FIFA U-17 World Championship ===
6 September Group B	New Zealand	0–4	Mali	Ismaïlia, Egypt
18:15 UTC+02:00		Report	33' Guindo; 64' Diarra; 70', 88' Keita	Stadium: Ismailia Stadium; Attendance: 9,000; Referee: (Poland) Jacek Granat

8 September Group B	New Zealand	0–5	Mexico	Ismaïlia, Egypt
20:30 UTC+02:00		Report	12' Martínez; 32' Salcedo; 41', 47' Gomez; 85' Santibáñez	Stadium: Ismailia Stadium; Attendance: 7,500; Referee: (Saudi Arabia) Abdul Aziz A. Al Dokhail

11 September Group B	New Zealand	0–13	Spain	Ismaïlia, Egypt
20:30 UTC+02:00		Report	23', 29' Sanchez; 28', 64' Mateos; 36' (pen.) Sergio; 44', 45+3', 47', 49' David; 62' Royo; 71' Ander; 87' Corona; 90+1' Iván Lopez	Stadium: Ismailia Stadium; Attendance: 5,000; Referee: (Egypt) Abdulhamid Radwan Abdulkareem

=== 1999 FIFA U-17 World Championship ===
10 November Group A	New Zealand	1–2	United States	Auckland, New Zealand
19:30 UTC+12:00	Mulligan 16'	Report	69' Thompson; 74' Donovan	Stadium: North Harbour Stadium; Attendance: 14,103; Referee: (Germany) Wolfgang Stark

13 November Group A	New Zealand	0–5	Uruguay	Auckland, New Zealand
13:45 UTC+12:00		Report	42' Lapolla; 45+1' Peralta; 63' Leal; 71' Martínez; 77' Meneses	Stadium: North Harbour Stadium; Attendance: 10,265; Referee: (Cyprus) Costas Kapitanis

16 November Group A	Poland	1–2	New Zealand	Auckland, New Zealand
18:00 UTC+12:00	Mierzejewski 88'	Report	53' Mulligan; 64' Pearce	Stadium: North Harbour Stadium; Attendance: 7,643; Referee: (Mexico) Edgar Rangel Perez

=== 2007 FIFA U-17 World Cup ===
18 August Group B	Brazil	7–0	New Zealand	Seogwipo, South Korea
17:00 UTC+09:00	Fabio 1'; Lazaro 6'; Giuliano 33'; Fabio 50'; Alex 54'; Lulinha 60' (pen.); Júnior 87'	Report		Stadium: Jeju World Cup Stadium; Attendance: 8,500; Referee: (Poland) Grzegorz Gilewski

21 August Group B	New Zealand	0–5	England	Seogwipo, South Korea
17:00 UTC+09:00		Report	3', 27' Welbeck; 7', 30' Moses; 88' Chambers	Stadium: Jeju World Cup Stadium; Attendance: 2,500; Referee: (France) Bertrand Layec

24 August Group B	North Korea	1–0	New Zealand	Ulsan, South Korea
17:00 UTC+09:00	Rim Chol Min 81'	Report		Stadium: Ulsan Stadium; Attendance: 6,000; Referee: (Portugal) Olegário Benquerença

=== 2009 FIFA U-17 World Cup ===
25 October Group D	Costa Rica	1–1	New Zealand	Enugu, Nigeria
19:00 UTC+01:00	Campbell 35'	Report	19' Built	Stadium: Nnamdi Azikiwe Stadium; Attendance: 16,850; Referee: (Seychelles) Eddy Maillet

28 October Group D	New Zealand	1–1	Burkina Faso	Enugu, Nigeria
16:00 UTC+01:00	Murie 57'	Report	12' Nikiema	Stadium: Nnamdi Azikiwe Stadium; Attendance: 10,195; Referee: (England) Howard Webb

31 October Group D	New Zealand	1–1	Turkey	Calabar, Nigeria
19:00 UTC+01:00	Hobson-McVeigh 90+1'	Report	12' Nikiema	Stadium: U. J. Esuene Stadium; Attendance: 7,000; Referee: (Uruguay) Martín Vázquez

5 November Round of 16	Nigeria	5–0	New Zealand	Abuja, Nigeria
19:00 UTC+01:00	Egbedi 14', 28'; Okoro 24'; Emmanuel 90+1'	Report		Stadium: Abuja Stadium; Attendance: 35,200; Referee: (Switzerland) Massimo Busacca

=== 2011 FIFA U-17 World Cup ===
19 June Group D	Uzbekistan	1–4	New Zealand	Torreón, Mexico
15:00 UTC−05:00	Khakimov 35'	Report	10', 36', 53' Carmichael; 87' Vale	Stadium: Estadio Corona; Attendance: 7,561; Referee: (Angola) Helder Martins

22 June Group D	Czech Republic	1–0	New Zealand	Torreón, Mexico
18:00 UTC−05:00	Juliš 28'	Report		Stadium: Estadio Corona; Attendance: 10,105; Referee: (Mexico) Roberto García

25 June Group D	United States	0–0	New Zealand	Pachuca, Mexico
18:00 UTC−05:00		Report		Stadium: Estadio Hidalgo; Attendance: 8,556; Referee: (Netherlands) Bas Nijhuis

29 June Round of 16	Japan	6–0	New Zealand	Monterrey, Mexico
18:00 UTC−05:00		Report		Stadium: Estadio Universitario; Referee: (Switzerland) Stephan Studer

=== 2013 FIFA U-17 World Cup ===
17 October Group B	Uruguay	7–0	New Zealand	Ras al-Khaimah, UAE
17:00	Méndez 3'; Otormín 37', 63'; Acosta 49', 57'; Ospitaleche 75'; Pizzichillo 89'	Report		Stadium: Emirates Club Stadium; Attendance: 1,201; Referee: Wolfgang Stark (Germany)

20 October Group B	Italy	1–0	New Zealand	Ras al-Khaimah, UAE
20:00	Vido 48'	Report		Stadium: Emirates Club Stadium; Attendance: 2,482; Referee: Elmer Bonilla (El Salvador)

23 October Group B	New Zealand	0–3	Côte d'Ivoire	Abu Dhabi, UAE
17:00		Report	Bakayoko 25', 48'; Yakou 87'	Stadium: Mohammed Bin Zayed Stadium; Attendance: 3,642; Referee: Abdulrahman Abdou (Qatar)

=== 2015 FIFA U-17 World Cup ===
19 October Group F	New Zealand	1–6	France	Puerto Montt, Chile
17:00	McGarry 76'	Report	McGarry 15' (o.g.); Boutobba 32'; Maouassa 34'; Doucoure 42'; Georgen 45'; Edouard 90+2'	Stadium: Estadio Regional de Chinquihue; Attendance: 8,134; Referee: Valdin Legister (Jamaica)

22 October Group F	New Zealand	0–0	Syria	Puerto Montt, Chile
17:00		Report		Stadium: Estadio Regional de Chinquihue; Attendance: 8,955; Referee: Malang Diedhiou (Senegal)

25 October Group F	Paraguay	1–2	New Zealand	Puerto Montt, Chile
16:00	Ñamandú 43'	Report	Ashworth 11'; Imrie 90+1'	Stadium: Estadio Regional de Chinquihue; Attendance: 6,571; Referee: Yevhen Aranovskiy (Ukraine)

28 October Round of 16	Brazil	1–0	New Zealand	Viña del Mar, Chile
17:00	L. Henrique 90+6' (pen.)	Report		Stadium: Estadio Sausalito; Attendance: 4,265; Referee: Mohd Amirul Izwan Yaacob (Malaysia)

=== 2017 FIFA U-17 World Cup ===
6 October Group B	New Zealand	1–1	Turkey	Navi Mumbai, India
17:00	Mata 58'	Report	Kutucu 18'	Stadium: DY Patil Stadium; Attendance: 9,727; Referee: John Pitti ()

9 October Group B	Paraguay	4–2	New Zealand	Navi Mumbai, India
20:00	Rodríguez 2'; Vega 75', 78'; Armoa 90+1'	Report	Duarte 20', 34' (o.g.)	Stadium: DY Patil Stadium; Attendance: 20,877; Referee: Bamlak Tessema Weyesa (Ethiopia)

12 October Group B	Mali	3–1	New Zealand	New Delhi, India
17:00	Salam 18'; Djemoussa 50'; Ndiaye 82'	Report	Spragg 72'	Stadium: Jawaharlal Nehru Stadium; Attendance: 23,112; Referee: Anastasios Sidiropoulos (Greece)

=== 2019 FIFA U-17 World Cup ===
26 October 2019	New Zealand	1–2	Angola	Estádio Bezerrão, Gama
20:00	Garbett 54'	Report	Zini 6'; Bark 60' (o.g.)	Attendance: 553; Referee: Ma Ning (China)

29 October 2019	Brazil	3–0	New Zealand	Estádio Bezerrão, Gama
20:00	Kaio 20'; Talles 81'; Diego 90+1'	Report		Attendance: 14,158; Referee: Mario Escobar (Guatemala)

1 November 2019	Canada	0–1	New Zealand	Estádio Bezerrão, Gama
20:00		Report	Garbett 27'	Attendance: 1,154; Referee: Mario Díaz de Vivar (Paraguay)

=== 2023 FIFA U-17 World Cup ===
12 November 2023	Venezuela	3–0	New Zealand	Jalak Harupat Stadium, Bandung
16:00	Martínez 29'; Romero 87', 90+7'	Report		Attendance: 2,932; Referee: Ibrahim Mutaz (Libya)

15 November 2023	New Zealand	1–3	Germany	Jalak Harupat Stadium, Bandung
19:00	Watson 90+1' (pen.)	Report	Brunner 45+7'; Moerstedt 60'; Yalçınkaya 81'	Attendance: 5,353; Referee: Dahane Beida (Mauritania)

18 November 2023	New Zealand	0–4	Mexico	Jalak Harupat Stadium, Bandung
16:45		Report	Barajas 42'; Fernandez 47'; Carrillo 54', 67' (pen.)	Attendance: 6,136; Referee: Omar Al Ali (United Arab Emirates)

=== 2025 FIFA U-17 World Cup ===
5 November 2025	Mali	3–0	New Zealand	Aspire Zone (pitch 2), Al Rayyan
17:45	Dembélé 17'; Ballo 55'; Bomba 78'	Report		Referee: Vasileios Fotias (Greece)

8 November 2025	Saudi Arabia	3–2	New Zealand	Aspire Zone (pitch 7), Al Rayyan
18:45	Sufyani 2'; Dahal 58'; Saeed 90+1'	Report	Núñez 55'; Perniskie 83'	Referee: Oleksii Derevinskyi (Ukraine)

11 November 2025	New Zealand	1–4	Austria	Aspire Zone (pitch 9), Al Rayyan
18:45	Britton 82'	Report	Jozepovic 49'; Dobis 87'; Deshishku 88', 90+4'	Referee: Tanguy Mebiame (Gabon)

== Current squad ==
The following players were called up to the 2025 FIFA U-17 World Cup in Qatar between 3–27 November 2025.

Caps and goals correct as of 11 November 2025, after the match against Austria.

No.	Pos.	Player	Date of birth (age)	Caps	Goals	Club
1	GK	Tobias Borgnis	30 September 2008 (age 18)	3	0	(The Football Association) Reading
12	GK	Joseph Chalabi	7 March 2009 (age 17)	3	0	(New Zealand Football) Wellington Phoenix
21	GK	Will Martin	26 January 2010 (age 16)	0	0	(Football Australia) Queensland Lions
4	DF	Ethan Dyer	24 June 2009 (age 17)	9	0	(Football Australia) Sydney
14	DF	Jackson O'Reilly	29 April 2008 (age 18)	2	0	(New Zealand Football) Brisbane Roar
15	DF	Luka Vicelich	15 May 2008 (age 18)	7	0	(New Zealand Football) Auckland
16	DF	Michael Wong	23 February 2008 (age 18)	6	0	(New Zealand Football) Auckland United
17	DF	Sean Kane	15 September 2009 (age 17)	2	0	(New Zealand Football) East Suburbs
18	DF	Daniel Nelson	24 January 2008 (age 18)	7	0	(New Zealand Football) Wellington Phoenix
3	MF	Alex Lienard	28 October 2008 (age 18)	7	1	(The Football Association) Sunderland
5	MF	Evan Masamba	27 March 2008 (age 18)	1	0	(New Zealand Football) Auckland
6	MF	Damion Kim	29 August 2008 (age 18)	7	0	(New Zealand Football) East Coast Bays
8	MF	Van Fitzharris	23 January 2008 (age 18)	6	2	(New Zealand Football) Auckland
10	MF	William Britton	27 March 2008 (age 18)	3	0	(New Zealand Football) Western Springs
19	MF	Nathan Martin	19 April 2008 (age 18)	6	2	(New Zealand Football) Auckland
2	FW	Joe McIntyre	30 January 2009 (age 17)	7	0	(New Zealand Football) Wellington Phoenix
7	FW	Jack Perniskie	7 January 2008 (age 18)	6	2	(New Zealand Football) Wellington Phoenix
9	FW	Justin Cardozo	4 January 2008 (age 18)	7	3	(Football Australia) Macarthur
11	FW	Matías Núñez	1 November 2009 (age 17)	4	1	(New Zealand Football) Auckland United
13	FW	Aaron Cartwright	5 July 2008 (age 18)	7	7	(Football Australia) Melbourne City
20	FW	Benjamin Perez Baldoni	30 July 2009 (age 17)	4	1	(New Zealand Football) Auckland

== Honours ==
- OFC U-16 Men's Championship:
  - Winners (12): 1997, 2007, 2009, 2011, 2013, 2015, 2017, 2018, 2023, 2024, 2025, 2026.
  - Runners-up (6): 1983, 1986, 1989, 1991, 1995, 2001.

== Head-to-head record ==
The following table shows New Zealand's head-to-head record in the FIFA U-17 World Cup and OFC U-16 Men's Championship.

=== In FIFA U-17 World Cup ===
Opponent	Pld	W	D	L	GF	GA	GD	Win %
Austria	1	0	0	1	1	4	−3	0.00
Angola	1	0	0	1	1	2	−1	0.00
Brazil	3	0	0	3	0	11	−11	0.00
Burkina Faso	1	0	1	0	1	1	+0	0.00
Canada	1	1	0	0	1	0	+1	100.00
Costa Rica	1	0	1	0	1	1	+0	0.00
Czech Republic	1	0	0	1	0	1	−1	0.00
England	1	0	0	1	0	5	−5	0.00
France	1	0	0	1	1	6	−5	0.00
Germany	1	0	0	1	1	3	−2	0.00
Italy	1	0	0	1	0	1	−1	0.00
Ivory Coast	1	0	0	1	0	3	−3	0.00
Japan	1	0	0	1	0	6	−6	0.00
Mali	3	0	0	3	1	10	−9	0.00
Mexico	2	0	0	2	0	9	−9	0.00
Nigeria	1	0	0	1	0	5	−5	0.00
North Korea	1	0	0	1	0	1	−1	0.00
Paraguay	2	1	0	1	4	5	−1	50.00
Poland	1	1	0	0	2	1	+1	100.00
Saudi Arabia	1	0	0	1	2	3	−1	0.00
Spain	1	0	0	1	0	13	−13	0.00
Syria	1	0	1	0	0	0	+0	0.00
Turkey	2	0	2	0	2	2	+0	0.00
United States	2	0	1	1	1	2	−1	0.00
Uruguay	2	0	0	2	0	12	−12	0.00
Uzbekistan	1	1	0	0	4	1	+3	100.00
Venezuela	1	0	0	1	0	3	−3	0.00
Total	36	4	6	26	23	111	−88	11.11

=== In OFC U-16 Men's Championship ===
Opponent	Pld	W	D	L	GF	GA	GD	Win %

== Other tournaments ==
In 1998 the Junior All Whites finished 27th in the Montaigu Tournament (French: Tournoi de Montaigu) a competition that is contested by under-16 national teams and clubs held in stadiums located in the Vendée department of France. The team contained four players who would go on to play for New Zealand at the 2010 FIFA World Cup: Jeremy Christie, Rory Fallon, David Mulligan, and Tony Lochhead.
