= 2011 OFC U-17 Championship =

Tournament details
- Host country: New Zealand
- City: Albany, North Shore City
- Dates: 8 to 19 January 2011
- Teams: 10 (from 1 confederation)
- Venue: 1 (in 1 host city)

Final positions
- Champions: New Zealand (4th title)
- Runners-up: Tahiti
- Third place: Solomon Islands
- Fourth place: Vanuatu

Tournament statistics
- Matches played: 22
- Goals scored: 118 (5.36 per match)
- Top scorer: (New Caledonia) Renaldo Nonmeu (8 goals)

The 2011 OFC U-17 Championship, was the OFC Under 17 Qualifying Tournament, the biennial football championship of Oceania (OFC). It was the 14th edition of the tournament and was held in Albany, North Shore City, New Zealand from 8 to 19 January 2011. New Zealand won the tournament and qualified for the 2011 FIFA U-17 World Cup, in Mexico.

10 teams, divided over two groups, competed for the top position, which gave rights for a spot in the final.

== Qualified teams ==
- New Zealand (host nation)
- Fiji
- Vanuatu
- Cook Islands
- American Samoa
- New Caledonia
- Tahiti
- Solomon Islands
- Papua New Guinea
- Tonga

== Venues ==
The tournament is being played at one venue Albany, North Shore City, New Zealand. North Harbour Stadium has a capacity of 25,000.

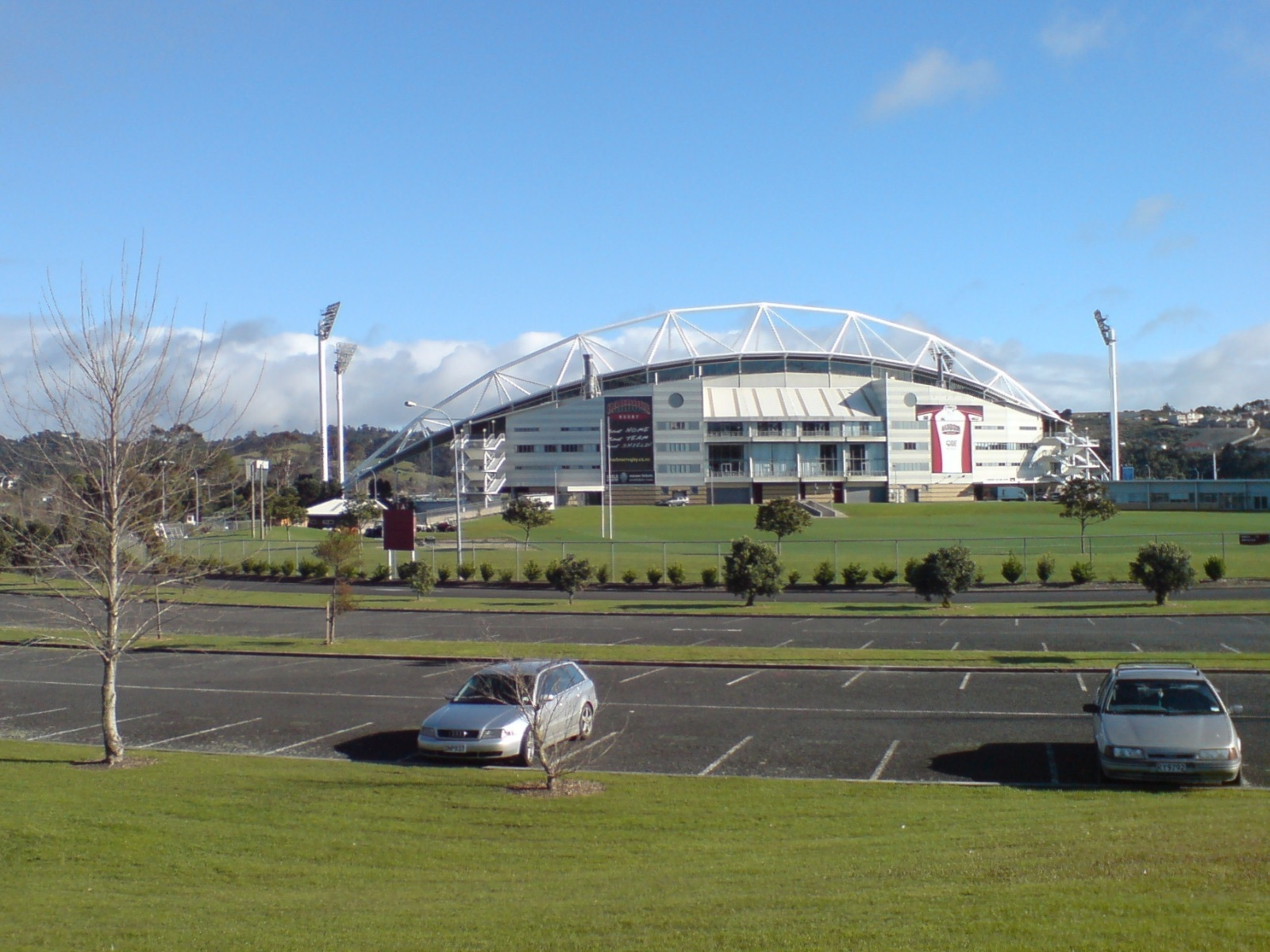

North Harbour Stadium

Location: Albany, North Shore City
Capacity: 25,000

The tournament was scheduled to be held at Trusts Stadium’s Douglas Field in Henderson but has been moved to Albany’s North Harbour Stadium, the venue of the OFC Women’s Nations Cup 2010 and several other recent OFC tournaments.

== Matches ==
=== Group stage ===
==== Group A ====
Team	Pld	W	D	L	GF	GA	GD	Pts
New Zealand	4	4	0	0	13	1	+12	12
Vanuatu	4	3	0	1	13	5	+8	9
Papua New Guinea	4	2	0	2	4	7	−3	6
Fiji	4	1	0	3	10	6	+4	3
American Samoa	4	0	0	4	1	22	−21	0

8 January 2011	American Samoa	0–9	Fiji	North Harbour Stadium, Auckland
13:30 NZST		Report; Summary	Rao 41', 78'; Verevou 45+2'; Sahib 68'; Naidu 73'; Kumar 87'; Hussain 89', 90+1'; Vaeao 90+3' (o.g.)

8 January 2011	Vanuatu	2–0	Papua New Guinea	North Harbour Stadium, Auckland
16:00 NZST	Mermer 41' (pen.); M. Coulon 59'	Report; Summary

10 January 2011	Papua New Guinea	2–1	Fiji	North Harbour Stadium, Auckland
13:30 NZST	Komolong 35'; Sabua 52'	Report; Summary	Sahib 21'

10 January 2011	New Zealand	5–1	Vanuatu	North Harbour Stadium, Auckland
16:00 NZST	Yamamoto 2'; Tuiloma 14'; Payne 23'; Vale 37'; Howieson 87'	Report; Summary	Mermer 48'

12 January 2011	New Zealand	1–0	Fiji	North Harbour Stadium, Auckland
13:30 NZST	Vale 49'	Report; Summary

12 January 2011	Papua New Guinea	2–1	American Samoa	North Harbour Stadium, Auckland
16:00 NZST	Browne 13'; Komolong 67'	Report; Summary	Petaia 22'

14 January 2011	New Zealand	4–0	American Samoa	North Harbour Stadium, Auckland
13:30 NZST	Wypych 23'; Turner 65'; Payne 77'; Yamamoto 78'	Report; Summary

14 January 2011	Fiji	0–3	Vanuatu	North Harbour Stadium, Auckland
16:00 NZST		Report; Summary	J. Kaltak 53', 76'; Mahit 85'

16 January 2011	New Zealand	3–0	Papua New Guinea	North Harbour Stadium, Auckland
13:00 NZST	Howlett 1'; Buswell 16'; Payne 54'	Report; Summary

16 January 2011	American Samoa	0–7	Vanuatu	North Harbour Stadium, Auckland
13:00 NZST		Report; Summary	J. Kaltak 24', 44', 61'; Ieremia 46'; T. Kaltak 77', 90+1'; Tenene 84'

==== Group B ====
Team	Pld	W	D	L	GF	GA	GD	Pts
Tahiti	4	4	0	0	14	2	+12	12
Solomon Islands	4	3	0	1	22	4	+18	9
New Caledonia	4	2	0	2	27	6	+21	6
Cook Islands	4	1	0	3	8	15	−7	3
Tonga	4	0	0	4	2	46	−44	0

9 January 2011	New Caledonia	1–2	Solomon Islands	North Harbour Stadium, Auckland
13:30 NZST	Buscaglia 17'	Report; Summary	Bitiai 11'; A. Fa'arodo 48'

9 January 2011	Tonga	0–8	Tahiti	North Harbour Stadium, Auckland
16:00 NZST		Report; Summary	Tehuritaua 6', 14', 77', 84'; Tahi 19'; Keck 27'; Yohann 68'; Teikiteepupuni 82'

11 January 2011	Solomon Islands	1–2	Tahiti	North Harbour Stadium, Auckland
13:30 NZST	Waimora 88'	Report; Summary	Yohann 55'; Misimake 85' (o.g.)

11 January 2011	New Caledonia	8–1	Cook Islands	North Harbour Stadium, Auckland
16:00 NZST	Tein-Padom 36', 57', 90+3'; Buscaglia 39', 88'; Nonmeu 69', 77', 79'	Report; Summary	Barringer-Tahiri 49'

13 January 2011	Tahiti	1–0	Cook Islands	North Harbour Stadium, Auckland
13:30 NZST	Tahi 59'	Report; Summary

13 January 2011	Solomon Islands	15–0	Tonga	North Harbour Stadium, Auckland
16:00 NZST	Waimora 19', 41', 43', 47'; Raramane 24'; Bitiai 28', 45'; Kuki 31', 54', 82'; Bosi 45', 64'; Pahulu 84' (o.g.); Mala 88'; M. Fa'arodo 89'	Report; Summary

15 January 2011	Cook Islands	6–2	Tonga	North Harbour Stadium, Auckland
13:30 NZST	Barringer-Tahiri 12'; Tiro 26', 37'; Smith 33'; Samuela 43' (pen.); Pennycook 90+4' (pen.)	Report; Summary	Maile 67'; Falatau 88'

15 January 2011	Tahiti	3–1	New Caledonia	North Harbour Stadium, Auckland
16:00 NZST	Aroita 9'; Manca 19'; Yohann 50'	Report; Summary	Tein-Padom 10'

17 January 2011	Tonga	0–17	New Caledonia	North Harbour Stadium, Auckland
13:00 NZST		Report; Summary	Nonmeu 10', 49' (pen.), 66', 70', 73'; Ausu 14', 38', 55', 64'; Malakai 46', 60'; Sakilia 47'; Passil 59'; Decoire 68'; Buscaglia 80'; Tein-Padom 82'; Djamali 89'

17 January 2011	Cook Islands	1–4	Solomon Islands	North Harbour Stadium, Auckland
13:00 NZST	Smith 45'	Report; Summary	Kuki 24'; Albert 54'; Waimora 63'; Bua 75'

=== 3rd place ===
19 January 2011; NZST	Vanuatu	0–2	Solomon Islands	North Harbour Stadium, Auckland
		Report; Summary	Mala 13', 26'

=== Final ===
19 January 2011; NZST	New Zealand	2–0	Tahiti	North Harbour Stadium, Auckland
	Howieson 7'; Payne 36'	Report; Summary		Attendance: 2,500; Referee: Andrew Achari (Fiji)

== Goal Scorers ==
8 goals

- (New Caledonia) Renaldo Nonmeu

6 goals

- (Solomon Islands) Alex Waimora

5 goals

- (Vanuatu) Jean Kaltak

4 goals

- (New Caledonia) Neyl Ausu
- (New Caledonia) Thomas Buscaglia
- (New Zealand) Tim Payne
- (Solomon Islands) Solo Kuki
- (French Polynesia) Tevairoa Tehuritaua

3 goals

- (New Zealand) Bradley Collier-Baker
- (Solomon Islands) John Bitiai
- (Solomon Islands) Harrison Mala
- (French Polynesia) Tihoni Yohann

2 goals

- (Cook Islands) Tyrell Barringer-Tahiri
- (Cook Islands) Tamaiva Smith
- (Cook Islands) Twin Tiro
- (Fiji) Akram Hussain
- (Fiji) Narendra Rao
- (Fiji) Al-Taaf Sahib
- (New Caledonia) Ben Malakai
- (New Zealand) Cameron Howieson
- (New Zealand) Jordan Vale
- (New Zealand) Ken Yamamoto
- (Papua New Guinea) Alwin Komolong
- (Solomon Islands) Gabriel Bosi
- (French Polynesia) Ahonui Tahi
- (Vanuatu) Tony Kaltak
- (Vanuatu) Santino Mermer

1 goal

- (American Samoa) Ryan Petaia
- (Cook Islands) Temana Pennycook
- (Cook Islands) Ant Samuela
- (Fiji) Shane Kumar
- (Fiji) Vineel Naidu
- (Fiji) Losefo Verevou
- (New Caledonia) Cedric Decoire
- (New Caledonia) Erwan Djamali
- (New Caledonia) Ricardo Passil
- (New Caledonia) Leon Sakilia
- (New Zealand) Nathan Buswell
- (New Zealand) Ryan Howlett
- (New Zealand) Bill Tuiloma
- (New Zealand) Rory Turner
- (New Zealand) James Wypych
- (Papua New Guinea) David Browne
- (Papua New Guinea) Jacob Sabua
- (Solomon Islands) Junior Albert
- (Solomon Islands) Dickson Bua
- (Solomon Islands) Atana Fa'arodo
- (Solomon Islands) Maeron Fa'arodo
- (Solomon Islands) Jimmy Raramane
- (French Polynesia) Rainui Aroita
- (French Polynesia) Tauhiti Keck
- (French Polynesia) Gianni Manca
- (French Polynesia) Heremana Teikiteepupuni
- (Tonga) Kinitoni Falatau
- (Tonga) Silakivai Maile
- (Vanuatu) Michel Coulon
- (Vanuatu) Mark Ieremia
- (Vanuatu) George Mahit
- (Vanuatu) Daniel Tenene

own goals

- (American Samoa) Lalotoa Vaeao (for Fiji)
- (Solomon Islands) Jerry Misimake (for Tahiti)
- (Tonga) Saimone Pahulu (for Solomon Islands)
