= 2007 OFC U-17 Championship =

Championnat d'Océanie de football des moins de 17 ans 2007

Tournament details
- Host country: Tahiti
- Dates: 21–25 March 2007
- Teams: 4 (from 1 confederation)
- Venue: 1 (in 1 host city)

Final positions
- Champions: New Zealand (2nd title)
- Runners-up: Tahiti
- Third place: Fiji
- Fourth place: New Caledonia

Tournament statistics
- Matches played: 6
- Goals scored: 13 (2.17 per match)
- Top scorer: (New Zealand) Kosta Barbarouses (5 goals)

The 2007 OFC Under-17 Tournament was association football competition in Oceania. It was the 12th edition of the OFC Under 17 Qualifying Tournament which was held in Tahiti from March 21 to March 25, 2007 at the Stade Pater Te Hono Nui. Only four team participated in the tournament; Tahiti, Fiji, New Caledonia and New Zealand. It served as a qualifying tournament to the 2007 FIFA U-17 World Cup.

Solomon Islands were supposed to compete in this tournament but withdrew because of the escalating costs for travel between the Solomon Islands and Tahiti.

== Results ==
Team	Pld	W	D	L	GF	GA	GD	Pts
New Zealand	3	3	0	0	9	2	+7	9
Tahiti	3	0	2	1	1	2	-1	2
Fiji	3	0	2	1	2	4	-2	2
New Caledonia	3	0	2	1	1	5	-4	2

20 March 2007

Fiji	1–3	New Zealand
Getia 68'	Report	Chettleburgh 44'; Barbarouses 58'; Mathews 68'

Stade Pater Te Hono Nui

20 March 2007

Tahiti	0–0	New Caledonia

Stade Pater Te Hono Nui

22 March 2007

Tahiti	1–2	New Zealand
Faatiarau 18'	Report	Hofmann 5'; Barbarouses 61'

Stade Pater Te Hono Nui

22 March 2007

Fiji	1–1	New Caledonia
Taware 19'	Report	Kayara 44' (pen.)

Stade Pater Te Hono Nui

24 March 2007

New Caledonia	0–4	New Zealand
	Report	Barbarouses 42', 73', 84'; Mathews 90'

Stade Pater Te Hono Nui

24 March 2007

Tahiti	0–0	Fiji
	Report

Stade Pater Te Hono Nui

By winning, New Zealand qualified to the 2007 FIFA U-17 World Cup.

== Winner ==
2007 OFC U-17 Championship winner

New Zealand
Second title

== Goal scorers ==
5 goals

- (New Zealand) Kosta Barbarouses

2 goals

- (New Zealand) Jacob Mathews

1 goal

- (Fiji) Solomon Getia
- (Fiji) Joshua Taware
- (New Caledonia) Roy Kayara
- (New Zealand) Chris Chettleburgh
- (French Polynesia) Stephane Faatiarau
