= 2009 OFC U-17 Championship =

Tournament details
- Host country: New Zealand
- Dates: 20 April – 24 April
- Teams: 4 (from 1 confederation)
- Venue: 1 (in 1 host city)

Final positions
- Champions: New Zealand (3rd title)
- Runners-up: Tahiti
- Third place: New Caledonia
- Fourth place: Vanuatu

Tournament statistics
- Matches played: 6
- Goals scored: 20 (3.33 per match)
- Top scorer(s): (New Zealand) Andrew Milne (French Polynesia) Heirarii Tevenae (3 goals)

The 2009 OFC Under 17 tournament was the 13th edition of the OFC Under 17 Qualifying Tournament which took place between 20 and 24 April 2009 in New Zealand. The winner was New Zealand who were the Oceania Football Confederation representative at the 2009 FIFA U-17 World Cup in Nigeria.

== Participating teams ==
- New Zealand (host)
- New Caledonia
- Tahiti
- Vanuatu

== Matches ==
Nation	Pts	Pld	W	D	L	GF	GA	GD
New Zealand	9	3	3	0	0	7	0	+7
Tahiti	6	3	2	0	1	9	5	+4
New Caledonia	3	3	1	0	2	3	7	-4
Vanuatu	0	3	0	0	3	1	8	-7

20 April 2009
12:30 NZST

New Caledonia	2–5	Tahiti
Manakeen 11'; Wahaga 47'		Kamoise 1'; Voirin 41' 58'; Tupea 82'; Tevenae 90'

North Harbour Stadium, Auckland

20 April 2009
15:00 NZST

New Zealand	3–0	Vanuatu
Doris 9'; Milne 14'; Murie 90+1'

North Harbour Stadium, Auckland

22 April 2009
12:30 NZST

Vanuatu	1–4	Tahiti
Maltungtung 12'		Tehau 11'; Tevenae 62', 80'; Dahlluin 77'

North Harbour Stadium, Auckland

22 April 2009
15:00 NZST

New Zealand	2–0	New Caledonia
Hobson-McVeigh 58'; Milne 87'

North Harbour Stadium, Auckland

24 April 2009
12:30 NZST

Vanuatu	0–1	New Caledonia
		Jules Patruel 3'

North Harbour Stadium, Auckland

24 April 2009
15:00 NZST

Tahiti	0–2	New Zealand
	Report	Sole 28'; Milne 31'

North Harbour Stadium, Auckland

== Goal scorers ==
3 goals

- (New Zealand) Andrew Milne (NZL)
- (French Polynesia) Heirarii Tevenae (TAH)

2 goals

- (French Polynesia) Kaurani Voirin (TAH)

1 goal

- (New Caledonia) Louis Manakeen (NCL)
- (New Caledonia) Jules Patruel (NCL)
- (New Caledonia) Stephane Wahaga (NCL)
- (New Zealand) Jamie Doris (NZL)
- (New Zealand) Jack Hobson-McVeigh (NZL)
- (New Zealand) Gordon Murie (NZL)
- (New Zealand) Zane Sole (NZL)
- (French Polynesia) Raimana Dahlluin (TAH)
- (French Polynesia) Hiva Kamoise (TAH)
- (French Polynesia) Heitini Tupea (TAH)
- (French Polynesia) Teaonui Tehau (TAH)
- (Vanuatu) Moken Maltungtung (VAN)

== Winner ==
2009 OFC U-17 Championship winner

New Zealand
Third title
