= 1986 Newcastle Rosebud United FC season =

Newcastle Rosebud United
1986 season
- Stadium: Adamstown Oval
- National Soccer League: 6th
- NSL Cup: Second round
- Top goalscorer: League: Mark Jones (10); All: Sean Ingham; Mark Jones (10)
- Highest home attendance: 2,865 vs. Sydney Croatia (5 April 1986); National Soccer League
- Lowest home attendance: 828 vs. Wollongong City (10 May 1986); National Soccer League
- Average home league attendance: 1,819
- Biggest win: 5–1 vs. Sydney City (H) (28 June 1986); National Soccer League
- Biggest defeat: 0–4 vs. Sydney Croatia (H) (5 April 1986); National Soccer League

The 1986 season was Newcastle Rosebud United's third and final season in the National Soccer League. Newcastle Rosebud United finished 6th in their National Soccer League season and were eliminated the NSL Cup second round against Sydney City.

== Players ==
Note: Flags indicate national team as defined under FIFA eligibility rules; some limited exceptions apply. Players may hold more than one non-FIFA nationality.

No.	Pos.	Nation	Player
—	DF	ENG	Ian Bannon
—	FW	AUS	John Cavanagh
—	MF	ENG	Paul Crabtree
—	GK	AUS	Steve Dorman
—		AUS	Matthew Garland
—	GK	NZL	Clint Gosling
—		AUS	Scott Haynes
—		AUS	Stewart Heap
—	FW	AUS	Sean Ingham
—	DF	AUS	Mark Jones

No.	Pos.	Nation	Player
—	DF	AUS	Ralph Maier
—		AUS	Peter McGuinness
—	MF	AUS	John McQuarrie
—		AUS	Ross Milosevic
—	DF	AUS	Bobby Naumov
—	DF	AUS	Neil Owens
—	MF	AUS	Joe Senkalski
—	FW	ENG	Derek Todd
—		AUS	Russell Turnbull

== Competitions ==
=== Overview ===
Competition	First match	Last match	Starting round	Final position	Record							
Competition	First match	Last match	Starting round	Final position	Pld	W	D	L	GF	GA	GD	Win %
National Soccer League	29 March 1986	13 September 1986	Matchday 1	6th	22	9	6	7	36	33	+3	40.91
NSL Cup	22 March 1986	27 April 1986	First round	Second round	2	1	0	1	2	3	−1	50.00
Total					24	10	6	8	38	36	+2	41.67

Last updated: complete
Source: Competitions

=== National Soccer League ===
==== League table ====
Northern Conference

Pos	Team	Pld	W	D	L	GF	GA	GD	Pts	Qualification or relegation
1	Sydney Croatia	22	14	4	4	43	18	+25	32	Qualification for the Finals series
2	Sydney Olympic	22	9	9	4	33	22	+11	27	Qualification for the Finals series
3	St George-Budapest	22	11	5	6	33	29	+4	27	Qualification for the Finals series
4	Marconi Fairfield	22	9	7	6	35	22	+13	25	Qualification for the Finals series
5	Sydney City	22	8	8	6	36	27	+9	24	Qualification for the Finals series and Oceania Cup Winners' Cup (Note: Sydney City qualified for the 1987 Oceania Cup Winners' Cup as the 1986 NSL Cup winners.)
6	Newcastle Rosebud United (R)	22	9	6	7	36	33	+3	24	Relegation to the 1987 NSW State League
7	APIA Leichhardt	22	9	6	7	25	23	+2	24	
8	Wollongong City (R)	22	9	5	8	26	25	+1	23	Relegation to the 1987 NSW State League
9	Blacktown City (R)	22	8	4	10	24	36	−12	20	Relegation to the 1987 NSW State League
10	Canberra City (R)	22	5	6	11	21	27	−6	16	Relegation to the 1987 NSW State League
11	Canterbury Marrickville (R)	22	2	7	13	17	41	−24	11	Relegation to the 1987 NSW State League
12	Inter Monaro (R)	22	3	5	14	17	43	−26	11	Relegation to the 1987 NSW State League

Updated to match(es) played on unknown. Source: rsssf.com
Rules for classification: 1) points; 2) goal difference; 3) number of goals scored.
(R) Relegated
Notes:

Southern Conference

Pos	Team	Pld	W	D	L	GF	GA	GD	Pts	Qualification or relegation
1	Brunswick Juventus	22	11	6	5	37	21	+16	28	Qualification for the Finals series
2	Footscray JUST	22	10	8	4	29	27	+2	28	Qualification for the Finals series
3	Adelaide City (C)	22	10	7	5	32	19	+13	27	Qualification for the Finals series and Oceania Club Championship
4	Sunshine George Cross	22	8	11	3	26	17	+9	27	Qualification for the Finals series
5	Heidelberg United	22	9	8	5	35	25	+10	26	Qualification for the Finals series
6	Preston Makedonia	22	8	9	5	30	20	+10	25	
7	South Melbourne	22	10	5	7	27	20	+7	25	
8	Brisbane Lions (R)	22	7	5	10	27	28	−1	19	Relegation to the 1987 Brisbane Premier League
9	West Adelaide (R)	22	7	4	11	26	34	−8	18	Relegation to the 1987 South Australian Division One
10	Melbourne Croatia	22	6	6	10	25	33	−8	18	
11	Brisbane City (R)	22	3	7	12	18	46	−28	13	Relegation to the 1987 Brisbane Premier League
12	Green Gully (R)	22	2	6	14	16	38	−22	10	Relegation to the 1987 Victorian State League

Updated to match(es) played on unknown. Source: rsssf.com
Rules for classification: 1) points; 2) goal difference; 3) number of goals scored.
(C) Champions; (R) Relegated

==== Results summary ====
Overall								Home						Away					
Pld	W	D	L	GF	GA	GD	Pts	W	D	L	GF	GA	GD	W	D	L	GF	GA	GD
22	9	6	7	36	33	+3	33	5	2	4	19	18	+1	4	4	3	17	15	+2

Source: worldfootball.net

==== Results by round ====
Round	1	2	3	4	5	6	7	8	9	10	11	12	13	14	15	16	17	18	19	20	21	22
Ground	A	H	A	H	A	H	A	A	A	H	A	H	A	H	A	H	A	H	H	H	A	H
Result	D	L	D	D	W	L	D	D	W	W	L	W	L	D	L	W	W	W	L	W	W	L
Position	6	10	9	10	8	9	9	8	8	6	6	5	8	6	7	7	5	5	6	6	5	6

Source: worldfootball.net
A = Away; H = Home; W = Win; D = Draw; L = Loss

==== Matches ====
29 March 1986 1	Sydney City	0–0	Newcastle Rosebud United	Woy Woy
		Report		Stadium: Woy Woy Oval; Attendance: 1,508; Referee: Arthur Owens

5 April 1986 2	Newcastle Rosebud United	0–4	Sydney Croatia	Newcastle
		Report	Arnold 43', 69'; Odzakov 60'; Jurin 67'	Stadium: Adamstown Oval; Attendance: 2,865; Referee: Roger Doenau

13 April 1986 3	APIA Leichhardt	1–1	Newcastle Rosebud United	Sydney
	Stewart 11'	Report	Jones 90'	Stadium: Lambert Park; Attendance: 1,929; Referee: Terry Seacy

19 April 1986 4	Newcastle Rosebud United	3–3	Sydney Olympic	Newcastle
	Ingham 15', 42'; Jones 87'	Report	Johnstone 55'; Brandt 74'; Raskopoulos 89'	Stadium: Adamstown Oval; Attendance: 2,837; Referee: Ken Small

4 May 1986 5	Canberra City	0–2	Newcastle Rosebud United	Canberra
		Report	Naumov 19', 87'	Stadium: Bruce Stadium; Attendance: 965; Referee: Tony Pollard

10 May 1986 6	Newcastle Rosebud United	0–1	Wollongong City	Newcastle
		Report	Rivero 19'	Stadium: Adamstown Oval; Attendance: 828; Referee: Graham Warne

18 May 1986 7	Marconi Fairfield	1–1	Newcastle Rosebud United	Sydney
	Gunning 88'	Report	Heap 40'	Stadium: Marconi Stadium; Attendance: 1,682; Referee: Roger Doenau

24 May 1986 8	Blacktown City	2–2	Newcastle Rosebud United	Sydney
	Bradley 5'; Carroll 77'	Report	Maier 67'; Jones 76'	Stadium: Gabbie Stadium; Attendance: 846; Referee: Jim Reeves

8 June 1986 9	Canterbury Marrickville	1–3	Newcastle Rosebud United	Sydney
	Radman 70'	Report	Ingham 34'; Cavanagh 42'; Jones 58'	Stadium: Arlington Oval; Attendance: 1,271; Referee: Arthur Owens

14 June 1986 10	Newcastle Rosebud United	1–0	Inter Monaro	Newcastle
	Jones 1' (pen.)	Report		Stadium: Adamstown Oval; Attendance: 1,043; Referee: Tony Pollard

22 June 1986 11	St George-Budapest	4–2	Newcastle Rosebud United	Sydney
	Fletcher 29', 46'; Ricoy 78'; Cotton 87'	Report	Ingham 2'; Jones 47'	Stadium: St George Stadium; Attendance: 653; Referee: Graham Warne

28 June 1986 12	Newcastle Rosebud United	5–1	Sydney City	Newcastle
	Cavanagh 37'; Jones 56', 70'; Ingham 68', 80'	Report	Kosmina 66' (pen.)	Stadium: Adamstown Oval; Attendance: 1,872; Referee: Manny Loupis

6 July 1986 13	Sydney Croatia	4–1	Newcastle Rosebud United	Sydney
	Jurin 22', 63'; Arnold 38'; Petkovic 51'	Report	Maier 53'	Stadium: King Tomislav Park; Attendance: 4,859; Referee: Bernie Upjohn

12 July 1986 14	Newcastle Rosebud United	0–0	APIA Leichhardt	Newcastle
		Report		Stadium: Adamstown Oval; Attendance: 1,147; Referee: Even Venios

20 July 1986 15	Sydney Olympic	1–0	Newcastle Rosebud United	Sydney
	Soper 64'	Report		Stadium: Pratten Park; Attendance: 3,877; Referee: Arthur Owens

26 July 1986 16	Newcastle Rosebud United	3–2	Canberra City	Newcastle
	McQuarrie 23'; Ingham 31'; Maier 87'	Report	Phillips 12'; Palacios 77'	Stadium: Adamstown Oval; Attendance: 1,263; Referee: Gary Power

13 August 1986 17	Wollongong City	1–4	Newcastle Rosebud United	Wollongong
	Brodnik 82q'	Report	Maier 60'; McQuarrie 64'; Jones 89', 90'	Stadium: Wollongong Showground; Attendance: 1,121; Referee: Graham Warne

16 August 1986 18	Newcastle Rosebud United	3–2	Marconi Fairfield	Newcastle
	Maier 22'; Sterrey 37' (o.g.); Naumov 81'	Report	Henderson 43'; Gray 90'	Stadium: Adamstown Oval; Attendance: 1,713; Referee: Tony Pollard

23 August 1986 19	Newcastle Rosebud United	1–3	Blacktown City	Newcastle
	Cavanah 82'	Report	Denyer 28', 69'; Carroll 73'	Stadium: Adamstown Oval; Attendance: 2,100; Referee: Roger Doenau

30 August 1986 20	Newcastle Rosebud United	2–0	Canterbury Marrickville	Newcastle
	Naumov 62'; Ingham 72'	Report		Stadium: Adamstown Oval; Attendance: 1,350; Referee: Gordon Nicholson

7 September 1986 21	Inter Monaro	0–1	Newcastle Rosebud United	Queanbeyan
		Report	McQuarrie 74'	Stadium: Seiffert Oval; Attendance: 303; Referee: Dennis Voutsinas

13 September 1986 22	Newcastle Rosebud United	1–2	St George-Budapest	Newcastle
	Ingham 18'	Report	Fletcher 16', 64'	Stadium: Adamstown Oval; Attendance: 3,000; Referee: Chris Bambridge

=== NSL Cup ===
22 March 1986 First round	Newcastle Rosebud United	2–1	Belmont Swansea	Newcastle
	Maier 50' (pen.); Ingham 80'	Report	Winsor 86'	Stadium: Adamstown Oval; Referee: Terry Seacy
Note: Newcastle Rosebud United fielded 12 players for this match.

27 April 1986 Second round	Sydney City	2–0	Newcastle Rosebud United	Sydney
	Farina 12'; Lee 72'	Report		Stadium: Sydney Athletic Field; Attendance: 350; Referee: Gary Power

== Statistics ==
=== Appearances and goals ===
Players with no appearances not included in the list.

No.	Pos.	Nat.	Name	National Soccer League		NSL Cup		Total	
No.	Pos.	Nat.	Name	Apps	Goals	Apps	Goals	Apps	Goals
—	DF	(England)	Ian Bannon	22	0	2	0	24	0
—	FW	(Australia)	John Cavanagh	22	3	2	0	24	3
—	MF	(England)	Paul Crabtree	18(1)	0	2	0	21	0
—	GK	(Australia)	Steve Dorman	1	0	0	0	1	0
—		(Australia)	Matthew Garland	10(3)	0	1(1)	0	15	0
—	GK	(New Zealand)	Clint Gosling	22	0	2	0	24	0
—		(Australia)	Scott Haynes	1(1)	0	1(1)	0	4	0
—		(Australia)	Stewart Heap	6(3)	1	0	0	9	1
—	FW	(Australia)	Sean Ingham	22	9	2	1	24	10
—	DF	(Australia)	Mark Jones	21	10	2	0	23	10
—	DF	(Australia)	Ralph Maier	22	5	2	1	24	6
—		(Australia)	Peter McGuinness	1	0	0	0	1	0
—	MF	(Australia)	John McQuarrie	9(1)	3	0	0	10	3
—		(Australia)	Ross Milosevic	19	0	2	0	21	0
—	DF	(Australia)	Bobby Naumov	19	4	1(1)	0	21	4
—	DF	(Australia)	Neil Owens	18(2)	0	2	0	22	0
—	MF	(Australia)	Joe Senkalski	7(1)	0	2	0	10	0
—		(Australia)	Russell Turnbull	2	0	0	0	2	0
Player(s) transferred out but featured this season
—	FW	(England)	Derek Todd	0	0	0(1)	0	1	0

=== Clean sheets ===
Rank	No.	Pos	Nat	Name	National Soccer League	NSL Cup	Total
1	—	GK	(Australia)	Clint Gosling	5	0	5
Total					5	0	5
