= Australian soccer clubs in international competitions =

Australian soccer clubs competing in international competitions

Australian soccer clubs have entered Asian and Oceania competitions (AFC Champions League, OFC Champions League and the now defunct Oceania Cup Winners' Cup) since 1987 where Adelaide City entered the competition as the Australian representative. Since 2007, Australian clubs have participated in this league. For their first five competitions, the A-League was given two spots in the league- one for the champions (grand final winners) and one for the premiers (regular season winners- or the losing grand finalist if the champions and premiers were the same team). For the 2012 competition, another half a spot was added, with the highest placed team on the A-League table which has not already qualified for the AFC Champions League entering a playoff to enter the competition.

The Western Sydney Wanderers are the only Australian side to win the competition, while Adelaide United are the only Australian side to have made the final and lost.

For the 2013 competition the AFC reduced the number of A-League qualification spots to 1.5. The Premiers (regular season winners) directly qualified for the Asian Champions League. The Champions (winners of grand final) entered a play off to qualify for the competition. The AFC ruled that the A-League did not meet the criteria for full participation in the tournament, including the lack of promotion and relegation within a tiered league system was a major reason, and that the A-league was not run as a separate entity to the FFA.

From the 2014 AFC Champions League until the 2016 edition, the allocation of two spots in the group stage and one qualifying play-off spot returned and in 2017, the qualifying play-off spot dropped back to a place in the preliminary round 2.

From the 2023–24 AFC Champions League season, Australian clubs will be allocated one spot in the group stage, and two spots in the 2023–24 AFC Cup group stage.

Australian soccer clubs have entered Asian and Oceania competitions (AFC Champions League, OFC Champions League and the now defunct Oceania Cup Winners' Cup). Australian clubs have also taken part in the FIFA Club World Cup and the Pan-Pacific Championship which however, were not won by any Australian club.

== Who qualifies for AFC competitions ==
Competition	Who qualifies
AFC Champions League group stage	A-League Men Premiers
AFC Cup group stage	A-League Men 2nd place
AFC Cup group stage	Australia Cup winners

=== From 2023–24 onwards ===
Competition	Who qualifies
AFC Champions League Elite group stage	A-League Men Premiers
AFC Champions League Two group stage	Australia Cup winners

== Winners of Asian, Oceania and worldwide competitions from Australia ==
Team	Number of Wins	Year(s)
Adelaide City	1	1987
Central Coast Mariners	1	2023–24
Hakoah Sydney City East	1	1987
South Melbourne	1	1999
Sydney FC	1	2005
Western Sydney Wanderers	1	2014
Wollongong Wolves	1	2001

== Asian, Oceania and world competition winners ==
AFC Champions League	AFC Cup	OFC Champions League	Cup Winners' Cup
2014 – Western Sydney Wanderers	2023–24 – Central Coast Mariners	2005 – Sydney FC	1987 – Hakoah Sydney City East
		2001 – Wollongong Wolves	
		1999 – South Melbourne	
		1987 – Adelaide City	

== Full Australian record for Australian soccer clubs ==
=== AFC Champions League Elite/AFC Champions League ===
Australian teams have won the competition 1 time and been in the final on 2 occasions as of 1 November 2014.

Year	Team	Progress	Score	Opponents	Venue(s)
1967–2006	Non-AFC member				
2007	Adelaide United	3rd in group stage	–	(Vietnam) Gach Dong Tam Long An, (South Korea) Seongnam Ilhwa Chunma, (China) Shandong Luneng Taishan	
2007	Sydney FC	2nd in group stage	–	(Indonesia) Persik Kediri, (China) Shanghai Shenua, (Japan) Urawa Red Diamonds	
2008	Adelaide United	Final	0–5	(Japan) Gamba Osaka	0–3 at Osaka Expo '70 Stadium; 0–2 at Hindmarsh Stadium
2008	Melbourne Victory	2nd in group stage	–	(Thailand) Chonburi, (South Korea) Chunnam Dragons, (Japan) Gamba Osaka	
2009	Central Coast Mariners	4th in group stage	–	(Japan) Kawasaki Frontale, (South Korea) Pohang Steelers, (China) Tianjin Teda	
2009	Newcastle Jets	Round of 16	0–6	(South Korea) Pohang Steelers	Pohang Steel Yard
2010	Adelaide United	Round of 16	2–3 (a.e.t.)	(South Korea) Jeonbuk Hyundai Motors	Hindmarsh Stadium
2010	Melbourne Victory	4th in group stage	–	(China) Beijing Guoan, (Japan) Kawasaki Frontale, (South Korea) Seongnam Ilhwa Chunma	
2011	Melbourne Victory	4th in group stage	–	(Japan) Gamba Osaka, (South Korea) Jeju United, (China) Tianjin Teda	
2011	Sydney FC	3rd in group stage	–	(Japan) Kashima Antlers, (China) Shanghai Shenua, (South Korea) Suwon Samsung Bluewings	
2012	Adelaide United	Quarterfinals	4–5	(Uzbekistan) Bunyodkor	2–2 at Hindmarsh Stadium; 2–3 (a.e.t.) at JAR Stadium
2012	Brisbane Roar	3rd in group stage	–	(China) Beijing Guoan, (Japan) FC Tokyo, (South Korea) Ulsan Hyundai	
2012	Central Coast Mariners	3rd in group stage	–	(Japan) Nagoya Grampus, (South Korea) Seongnam Ilhwa Chunma, (China) Tianjin Teda	
2013	Brisbane Roar	Qualifying play-off	0–0 (a.e.t.) (0–3 p)	(Thailand) Buriram United	Buriram Stadium
2013	Central Coast Mariners	Round of 16	1–5	(China) Guangzhou Evergrande	1–2 at Central Coast Stadium; 0–3 at Tianhe Stadium
2014	Central Coast Mariners	4th in group stage	–	(China) Beijing Guoan, (South Korea) FC Seoul, (Japan) Sanfrecce Hiroshima	
2014	Melbourne Victory	3rd in group stage	–	(China) Guangzhou Evergrande, (South Korea) Jeonbuk Hyundai Motors, (Japan) Yokohama F. Marinos	
2014	Western Sydney Wanderers	Winners	1–0	(Saudi Arabia) Al Hilal	1–0 at Parramatta Stadium; 0–0 at King Fahd International Stadium
2015	Brisbane Roar	3rd in group stage	–	(China) Beijing Guoan, (South Korea) Suwon Samsung Bluewings, (Japan) Urawa Red Diamonds	
2015	Central Coast Mariners	Qualifying play-off	1–3	(China) Guangzhou R&F	Central Coast Stadium
2015	Western Sydney Wanderers	3rd in group stage	–	(South Korea) FC Seoul, (China) Guangzhou Evergrande, (Japan) Kashima Antlers	
2016	Adelaide United	Qualifying play-off	1–2	(China) Shandong Luneng	Hindmarsh Stadium
2016	Melbourne Victory	Round of 16	2–3	(South Korea) Jeonbuk Hyundai Motors	1–1 at Melbourne Rectangular Stadium; 1–2 at Jeonju World Cup Stadium
2016	Sydney FC	Round of 16	3–3 (a)	(China) Shandong Luneng	1–1 at Jinan Olympic Sports Center Stadium; 2–2 at Sydney Football Stadium
2017	Adelaide United	3rd in group stage	–	(Japan) Gamba Osaka, (South Korea) Jeju United, (China) Jiangsu Suning	
2017	Brisbane Roar	4th in group stage	–	(Japan) Kashima Antlers, (Thailand) Muangthong United, (South Korea) Ulsan Hyundai	
2017	Western Sydney Wanderers	4th in group stage	–	(South Korea) FC Seoul, (China) Shanghai SIPG, (Japan) Urawa Red Diamonds	
2018	Brisbane Roar	Preliminary round 2	2–3	(Philippines) Ceres-Negros	Queensland Sport and Athletics Centre
2018	Melbourne Victory	3rd in group stage	–	(Japan) Kawasaki Frontale, (China) Shanghai SIPG, (South Korea) Ulsan Hyundai	
2018	Sydney FC	3rd in group stage	–	(Japan) Kashima Antlers, (China) Shanghai Shenua, (South Korea) Suwon Samsung Bluewings	
2019	Melbourne Victory	4th in group stage	–	(South Korea) Daegu, (China) Guangzhou Evergrande, (Japan) Sanfrecce Hiroshima	
2019	Newcastle Jets	Qualifying play-off	1–4	(Japan) Kashima Antlers	Kashima Soccer Stadium
2019	Sydney FC	4th in group stage	–	(Japan) Kawasaki Frontale, (China) Shanghai SIPG, (South Korea) Ulsan Hyundai	
2020	Melbourne Victory	Round of 16	0–3	(South Korea) Ulsan Hyundai	Education City Stadium
2020	Perth Glory	4th in group stage	–	(Japan) FC Tokyo, (China) Shanghai Shenhua, (South Korea) Ulsan Hyundai	
2020	Sydney FC	4th in group stage	–	(South Korea) Jeonbuk Hyundai Motors, (China) Shanghai SIPG, (Japan) Yokohama F. Marinos	
2022	Melbourne Victory	Qualifying play-off	3–4 (a.e.t.)	(Japan) Vissel Kobe	Noevir Stadium Kobe
2022	Melbourne City	2nd in group stage	–	(Thailand) BG Pathum United, (South Korea) Jeonnam Dragons, (Philippines) United City	
2022	Sydney FC	4th in group stage	–	(Vietnam) Hoang Anh Gia Lai, (South Korea) Jeonbuk Hyundai Motors, (Japan) Yokohama F. Marinos	
2023–24	Melbourne City	2nd in group stage	–	(Thailand) Buriram United, (Japan) Ventforet Kofu, (China) Zhejiang	
2024–25	Central Coast Mariners	11th in league stage	–	(Thailand) Buriram United, (Malaysia) Johor Darul Ta'zim, (Japan) Kawasaki Frontale, (China) Shandong Taishan, (China) Shanghai Port, (China) Shanghai Shenhua, (Japan) Vissel Kobe, (Japan) Yokohama F. Marinos	
2025–26	Melbourne City FC	Round of 16	1–1 (a.e.t.) (2–4 p)	(Thailand) Buriram United	1–1 at Melbourne Rectangular Stadium; 0–0 at Buriram Stadium (a.e.t.) (2–4 p)

=== AFC Champions League Two/AFC Cup ===
Year	Team	Progress	Score	Opponents	Venue(s)
2023–24	Central Coast Mariners	Winners	1–0	(Lebanon) Al Ahed	Sultan Qaboos Sports Complex, Muscat, Oman
2023–24	Macarthur FC	Zonal final	2–3 (a.e.t.)	(Australia) Central Coast Mariners	Campbelltown Sports Stadium
2024–25	Sydney FC	Semi-finals	1–2	(Singapore) Lion City Sailors	0–2 at Jalan Besar Stadium; 1–0 at Sydney Football Stadium
2025–26	Macarthur FC	Round of 16	2–4	(Thailand) Bangkok United	2–0 at Pathum Thani Stadium; 2–2 at Campbelltown Sports Stadium

=== OFC Champions League ===
Australian teams have won the competition 4 times and been in the final on 4 occasions as of 10 June 2005.

Year	Team	Progress	Score	Opponents	Venue(s)
1987	Adelaide City	Winners	1–1 (4–1 p)	(New Zealand) University-Mount Wellington	Hindmarsh Stadium
1999	South Melbourne	Winners	5–1	(Fiji) Nadi	Prince Charles Park
2001	Wollongong Wolves	Winners	1–0	(Vanuatu) Tafea	Lloyd Robson Stadium
2005	Sydney FC	Winners	2–0	(New Caledonia) AS Magenta	Stade Pater

=== Oceania Cup Winners' Cup ===
Year	Team	Progress	Score	Opponents	Venue(s)
1987	Sydney City	Winners	2–0	(New Zealand) North Shore United	Fuji Film Stadium

== Performance summary by competition ==
=== AFC Champions League Elite/AFC Champions League ===
GS: Group stage, LS: League stage, R16: Round of 16, QF: Quarter-Finals, SF: Semi-Finals, RU: Runners-Up, W: Winners,

Team	Qualified	2007	2008	2009	2010	2011	2012	2013	2014	2015	2016	2017	2018	2019	2020	2021	2022	23–24	24–25	25–26	26–27
Western Sydney Wanderers	3 times								W	GS		GS									
Adelaide United	5 times	GS	RU		R16		QF					GS									
Melbourne Victory	8 times		GS		GS	GS			GS		R16		GS	GS	R16						
Sydney FC	7 times	GS				GS					R16		GS	GS	GS		GS				
Central Coast Mariners	5 times			GS			GS	R16	GS										LS		
Newcastle Jets	2 time			R16																	LS
Brisbane Roar	3 times						GS			GS		GS									
Perth Glory	1 time														GS						
Melbourne City	3 times																GS	GS		R16	

=== AFC Champions League Two/AFC Cup ===
Team	Qualified	23–24	24–25	25–26
Central Coast Mariners	1 time	W		
Macarthur FC	2 times	ZF		R16
Sydney FC	1 time		SF	

=== FIFA Club World Cup ===
Year	Team	Progress	Score	Opponents	Venue(s)
2000	South Melbourne	4th in group stage	N/A	(England) Manchester United, (Mexico) Necaxa, (Brazil) Vasco da Gama	Maracanã Stadium, Rio de Janeiro, Brazil
2005	Sydney FC	5th	2–1	(Egypt) Al Ahly	National Stadium. Tokyo, Japan
2008	Adelaide United	5th	1–0	(Egypt) Al Ahly	International Stadium Yokohama, Yokohama, Japan
2014	Western Sydney Wanderers	6th	2–2 (4–5 p)	(Algeria) ES Sétif	Stade de Marrakech. Marrakesh, Morocco

=== Pan-Pacific Championship ===
Year	Team	Progress	Score	Opponents	Venue(s)
2008	Sydney FC	Semi-finals	0–3	(United States) Houston Dynamo	Aloha Stadium, Halawa, United States

== See also ==
- Chinese clubs in the AFC Champions League
- Indian football clubs in Asian competitions
- Indonesian football clubs in Asian competitions
- Iranian clubs in the AFC Champions League
- Iraqi clubs in the AFC Champions League
- Japanese clubs in the AFC Champions League
- Myanmar clubs in the AFC Champions League
- Qatari clubs in the AFC Champions League
- Saudi Arabian clubs in the AFC Champions League
- South Korean football clubs in Asian competitions
- Thai clubs in the AFC Champions League
- Vietnamese clubs in the AFC Champions League
