= 1986 in Australian soccer =

Soccer in Australia
- Season: 1986

Men's soccer
- NSL Premiership: Sydney Croatia; Brunswick Juventus
- NSL Championship: Adelaide City
- NSL Cup: Sydney City

The 1986 season was the 17th season of national competitive soccer in Australia and 103rd overall.

== National teams ==
=== Australia men's national soccer team ===
==== Results and fixtures ====
===== Friendlies =====
3 August 1986	Australia	1–1	Czechoslovakia	Melbourne, Australia
	Arnold 90'	Report	Kubik 55'	Stadium: Olympic Park; Attendance: Referee: Chris Bambridge (Australia)

6 August 1986	Australia	0–1	Czechoslovakia	Adelaide, Australia
		Report	Griga 50'	Stadium: Hindmarsh Stadium; Attendance: 2,000; Referee: Don Campbell (Australia)

10 August 1986	Australia	0–3	Czechoslovakia	Sydney, Australia
		Report	Kula 23'; Kubik 53' (pen.), 85'	Stadium: Parramatta Stadium; Attendance: 10,150; Referee: Richard Lorenc (Australia)

25 October 1986 Trans-Tasman Cup	New Zealand	1–1	Australia	Auckland, New Zealand
	Deeley 60'	Report	Arnold 55'	Stadium: Mount Smart Stadium; Attendance: 3,156; Referee: Garry Fleet (New Zealand)

2 November 1986 Trans-Tasman Cup	Australia	2–0	New Zealand	Sydney, Australia
	Arnold 29'; Zinni 74'	Report		Stadium: Parramatta Stadium; Attendance: 4,800; Referee: Gary Power (Australia)

23 November 1986 Ampol Cup	China	0–2	Australia	Guangzhou, China
	Kalantzis ?'; Arnold ?'	Report

=== Australia women's national soccer team ===
==== Results and fixtures ====
===== 1986 OFC Women's Championship =====
====== First round ======
Pos	Team	Pld	W	D	L	GF	GA	GD	Pts	Qualification
1	Chinese Taipei	3	3	0	0	4	1	+3	6	Advanced to Final
2	Australia	3	2	0	1	3	2	+1	4	Advanced to Final
3	New Zealand	3	1	0	2	3	3	0	2	Advanced to Third place play-off
4	New Zealand B	3	0	0	3	1	5	−4	0	Advanced to Third place play-off

Source: RSSSF

29 March 1986	New Zealand	0–1	Australia	Christchurch, New Zealand
		Report	Iserief ?'	Stadium: Queen Elizabeth II Park; Attendance: Referee: Chou I-Fa (Chinese Taipei)

31 March 1986	Chinese Taipei	1–0	Australia	Christchurch, New Zealand
	Tai-ying HT+15'	Report		Stadium: Queen Elizabeth II Park

====== Final ======
31 March 1986	Chinese Taipei	4–1	Australia	Christchurch, New Zealand
	Yu-chu HT+4', HT+11'; Hsiu-chih HT+18'; Hsiu-min FT+3'	Report	Martin HT+15'	Stadium: Queen Elizabeth II Park

=== Australia men's national under-20 soccer team ===
==== Results and fixtures ====
===== 1986 OFC U-20 Championship =====
Pos	Team	Pld	W	D	L	GF	GA	GD	Pts	Qualification
1	Australia	4	3	1	0	16	1	+15	7	Qualification for 1987 FIFA World Youth Championship
2	Israel	4	2	2	0	11	3	+8	6	
3	New Zealand (H)	4	0	3	1	1	4	−3	3	
4	Chinese Taipei	4	0	2	2	4	13	−9	2	
5	Fiji	4	0	2	2	3	14	−11	2	

Source: RSSSF
(H) Hosts

17 October 1986	Australia	7–0	Fiji	Auckland, New Zealand
		Report		Stadium: Mount Smart Stadium

19 October 1986	Australia	1–1	Israel	Auckland, New Zealand
		Report		Stadium: Mount Smart Stadium

23 October 1986	Australia	5–0	Chinese Taipei	Auckland, New Zealand
		Report		Stadium: Mount Smart Stadium

26 October 1986	New Zealand	0–3	Australia	Auckland, New Zealand
		Report		Stadium: Mount Smart Stadium

=== Australia men's national under-17 soccer team ===
==== Results and fixtures ====
===== 1986 OFC U-17 Championship =====
Pos	Team	Pld	W	D	L	GF	GA	GD	Pts	Qualification
1	Australia	4	3	0	1	10	1	+9	6	Qualification for 1987 FIFA U-16 World Championship
2	New Zealand	4	2	2	0	3	1	+2	6	
3	Chinese Taipei (H)	4	2	0	2	5	6	−1	4	
4	Papua New Guinea	4	0	2	2	1	5	−4	2	
5	Fiji	4	0	2	2	2	8	−6	2	

Source: RSSSF
(H) Hosts

7 December 1986	Australia	3–0	Papua New Guinea	Kaohsiung, Chinese Taipei
	Dimoudis 12'; Christopoulos 42', 51'	Report		Stadium: Chungcheng Stadium; Referee: Chen Ming-Chiu (Chinese Taipei)

8 December 1986	Fiji	0–4	Australia	Kaohsiung, Chinese Taipei
			Brown 29'; Rago 56'; Dimoudis 58', 74'	Stadium: Chungcheng Stadium; Referee: Chow Yi-Fa (Chinese Taipei)

10 December 1986	Chinese Taipei	0–3	Australia	Kaohsiung, Chinese Taipei
			Dimoudis 20', 29' (pen.); Rago 76'	Stadium: Chungcheng Stadium; Referee: Mahendra Singh (Fiji)

14 December 1986	Australia	0–1	New Zealand	Kaohsiung, Chinese Taipei
			Ashton 56'	Stadium: Chungcheng Stadium; Referee: Chow Yi-Fa (Chinese Taipei)

== Domestic soccer ==
=== National Soccer League ===
Northern Conference

Pos	Team	Pld	W	D	L	GF	GA	GD	Pts	Qualification or relegation
1	Sydney Croatia	22	14	4	4	43	18	+25	32	Qualification for the Finals series
2	Sydney Olympic	22	9	9	4	33	22	+11	27	Qualification for the Finals series
3	St George-Budapest	22	11	5	6	33	29	+4	27	Qualification for the Finals series
4	Marconi Fairfield	22	9	7	6	35	22	+13	25	Qualification for the Finals series
5	Sydney City	22	8	8	6	36	27	+9	24	Qualification for the Finals series and Oceania Cup Winners' Cup (Note: Sydney City qualified for the 1987 Oceania Cup Winners' Cup as the 1986 NSL Cup winners.)
6	Newcastle Rosebud United (R)	22	9	6	7	36	33	+3	24	Relegation to the 1987 NSW State League
7	APIA Leichhardt	22	9	6	7	25	23	+2	24	
8	Wollongong City (R)	22	9	5	8	26	25	+1	23	Relegation to the 1987 NSW State League
9	Blacktown City (R)	22	8	4	10	24	36	−12	20	Relegation to the 1987 NSW State League
10	Canberra City (R)	22	5	6	11	21	27	−6	16	Relegation to the 1987 NSW State League
11	Canterbury Marrickville (R)	22	2	7	13	17	41	−24	11	Relegation to the 1987 NSW State League
12	Inter Monaro (R)	22	3	5	14	17	43	−26	11	Relegation to the 1987 NSW State League

Updated to match(es) played on unknown. Source: rsssf.com
Rules for classification: 1) points; 2) goal difference; 3) number of goals scored.
(R) Relegated
Notes:

Southern Conference

Pos	Team	Pld	W	D	L	GF	GA	GD	Pts	Qualification or relegation
1	Brunswick Juventus	22	11	6	5	37	21	+16	28	Qualification for the Finals series
2	Footscray JUST	22	10	8	4	29	27	+2	28	Qualification for the Finals series
3	Adelaide City (C)	22	10	7	5	32	19	+13	27	Qualification for the Finals series and Oceania Club Championship
4	Sunshine George Cross	22	8	11	3	26	17	+9	27	Qualification for the Finals series
5	Heidelberg United	22	9	8	5	35	25	+10	26	Qualification for the Finals series
6	Preston Makedonia	22	8	9	5	30	20	+10	25	
7	South Melbourne	22	10	5	7	27	20	+7	25	
8	Brisbane Lions (R)	22	7	5	10	27	28	−1	19	Relegation to the 1987 Brisbane Premier League
9	West Adelaide (R)	22	7	4	11	26	34	−8	18	Relegation to the 1987 South Australian Division One
10	Melbourne Croatia	22	6	6	10	25	33	−8	18	
11	Brisbane City (R)	22	3	7	12	18	46	−28	13	Relegation to the 1987 Brisbane Premier League
12	Green Gully (R)	22	2	6	14	16	38	−22	10	Relegation to the 1987 Victorian State League

Updated to match(es) played on unknown. Source: rsssf.com
Rules for classification: 1) points; 2) goal difference; 3) number of goals scored.
(C) Champions; (R) Relegated

=== NSL Cup ===
==== Final ====
17 September 1986
20:00 ACST

Adelaide Hellas	2–3 (a.e.t.)	Sydney City
Hristodoulou 49', 112'	Report	Kosmina 61'; Farina 114', 118'

Hindmarsh Stadium, Adelaide
Attendance: 3,200
Referee: Stewart Mellings
