= 1986 OFC U-17 Championship =

Tournament details
- Host country: Chinese Taipei
- City: Kaohsiung
- Dates: 7–14 December 1986
- Teams: 5 (from 5 associations)
- Venue: 1 (in 1 host city)

Final positions
- Champions: Australia (2nd title)
- Runners-up: New Zealand
- Third place: Chinese Taipei
- Fourth place: Papua New Guinea

Tournament statistics
- Matches played: 10
- Goals scored: 21 (2.1 per match)
- Top scorer(s): (Australia) Steve Dimoudis (5 goals)

The 1986 OFC U-17 Championship was the second edition of the OFC U-16/U-17 Championship, the international youth football championship organised by OFC for the men's under-17 national teams of Oceania. This doubled as the qualifiers for the 1987 FIFA U-16 World Championship.

Australia were the defending champions, and won their second title by goal difference over New Zealand and subsequently qualified for the 1987 FIFA U-16 World Championship.

== Teams ==
Five teams entered the tournament from five confederations.

- Australia
- Chinese Taipei (hosts)
- Fiji
- New Zealand
- Papua New Guinea

== Standings ==
Pos	Team	Pld	W	D	L	GF	GA	GD	Pts	Qualification
1	Australia	4	3	0	1	10	1	+9	6	Qualification for 1987 FIFA U-16 World Championship
2	New Zealand	4	2	2	0	3	1	+2	6	
3	Chinese Taipei (H)	4	2	0	2	5	6	−1	4	
4	Papua New Guinea	4	0	2	2	1	5	−4	2	
5	Fiji	4	0	2	2	2	8	−6	2	

Source: RSSSF
(H) Hosts

== Venues ==
Chinese Taipei	1986 OFC U-17 Championship is located in Taiwan
Kaohsiung	1986 OFC U-17 Championship is located in Taiwan
Chungcheng Stadium	1986 OFC U-17 Championship is located in Taiwan
Capacity: 30,000	1986 OFC U-17 Championship is located in Taiwan

== Matches ==
7 December 1986

Australia	3–0	Papua New Guinea
Dimoudis 12'; Christopoulos 42', 51'	Report

Chungcheng Stadium, Kaohsiung
Referee: Chen Ming-Chiu (Chinese Taipei)
7 December 1986

Chinese Taipei	0–1	New Zealand
	Report	Musin 59'

Chungcheng Stadium, Kaohsiung

8 December 1986

Fiji	0–4	Australia
		Brown 29'; Rago 56'; Dimoudis 58', 74'

Chungcheng Stadium, Kaohsiung
Referee: Chow Yi-Fa (Chinese Taipei)
8 December 1986

New Zealand	0–0	Papua New Guinea

Chungcheng Stadium, Kaohsiung

10 December 1986

Fiji	0–0	Papua New Guinea

Chungcheng Stadium, Kaohsiung
10 December 1986

Chinese Taipei	0–3	Australia
		Dimoudis 20', 29' (pen.); Rago 76'

Chungcheng Stadium, Kaohsiung
Referee: Mahendra Singh (Fiji)

12 December 1986

Fiji	1–1	New Zealand
(unknown) ?'		Fangmaki ?' (o.g.)

Chungcheng Stadium, Kaohsiung
12 December 1986

Chinese Taipei	2–1	Papua New Guinea
Jui-Yuan 34', ?'		Wei-Liang ?' (o.g.)

Chungcheng Stadium, Kaohsiung

14 December 1986

Chinese Taipei	3–1	Fiji
Jui-Yuan 26'; Chun-I 42'; Ming-Tai 48'		Shakuwa 76'

Chungcheng Stadium, Kaohsiung
14 December 1986

Australia	0–1	New Zealand
		Ashton 56'

Chungcheng Stadium, Kaohsiung
Referee: Chow Yi-Fa (Chinese Taipei)

== Goalscorers ==
There were 21 goals scored in 10 matches, for an average of 2.1 goals per match.

Two own goals were scored throughout the tournament.

5 goals

- (Australia) Steve Dimoudis

3 goals

- (Chinese Taipei) Hu Jui-Yuan

2 goals

- (Australia) Paul Rago
- (Australia) John Christopoulos

1 goal

- (Australia) Steve Brown
- (Chinese Taipei) Wu Chun-I
- (Chinese Taipei) Lin Ming-Tai
- (Fiji) Shakuwa
- (Fiji) (unknown)
- (New Zealand) Craig Ashton
- (New Zealand) Anton Musin

1 own goal

- (Chinese Taipei) Han Wei-Liang (against Papua New Guinea)
- (Fiji) Fangmaki (against New Zealand)
