= Tiendeveen =

- Village
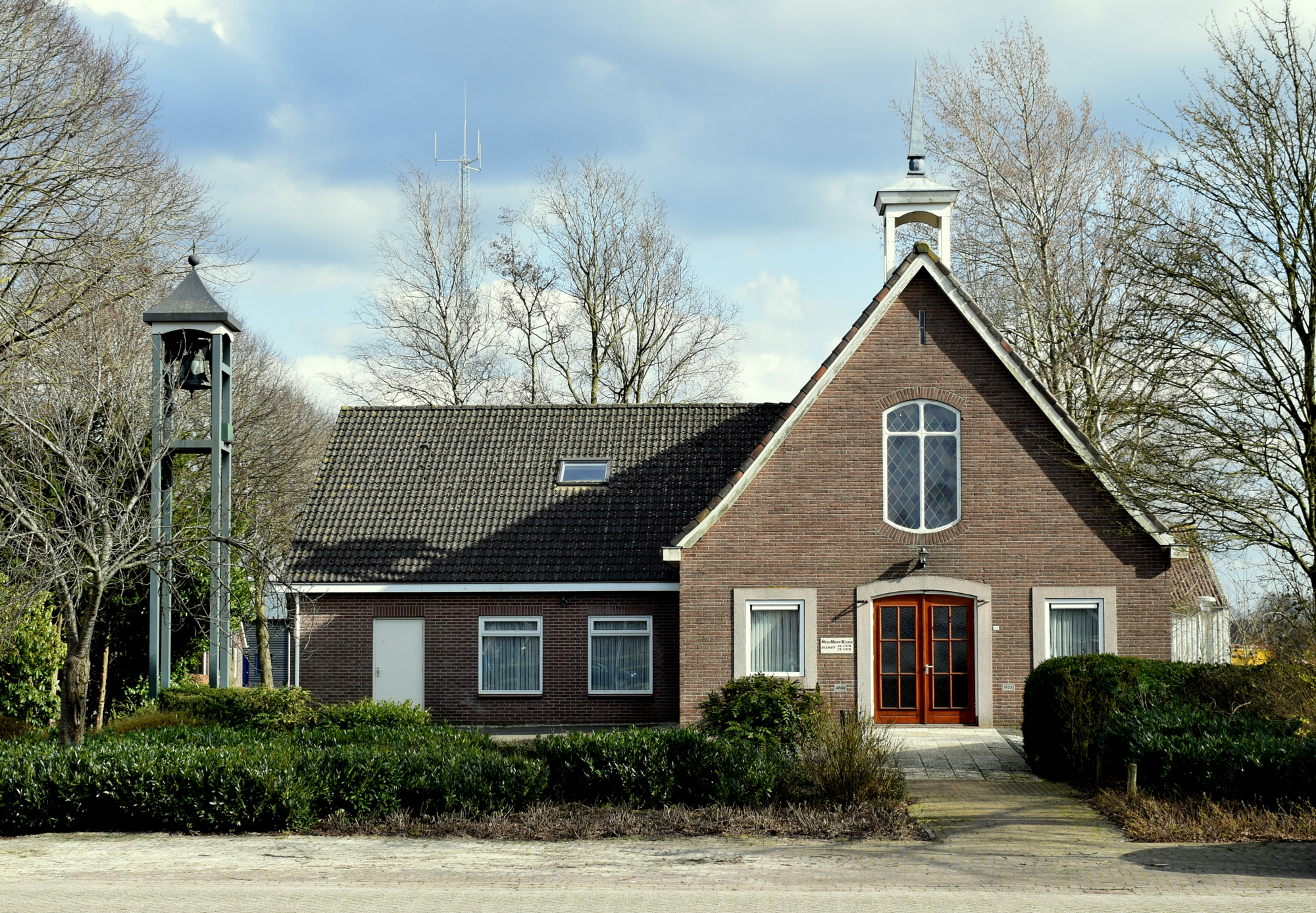
- Church in Tiendeveen

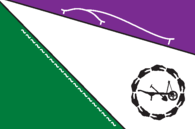
- Flag

- Location in province of Drenthe in the Netherlands Tiendeveen (Netherlands)
- Coordinates: 52°44′49″N 6°32′38″E
- Country: Netherlands
- Province: Drenthe
- Municipality: Hoogeveen

Area
  - Total: 8.23 km^{2} (3.18 sq mi)
- Elevation: 15 m (49 ft)

Population (2021)
  - Total: 670
  - Density: 81/km^{2} (210/sq mi)
- Time zone: UTC+1 (CET)
  - Summer (DST): UTC+2 (CEST)
- Postal code: 7936
- Dialing code: 0528

Tiendeveen is a village in the Netherlands, in the municipality of Hoogeveen. Tiendeveen takes its name from the Dutch word for peat, "veen", which is collected there, just as in Hoogeveen and Witteveen.
