= Witteveen (disambiguation) =

Witteveen is a Dutch surname.

Witteveen may also refer to:

- Witteveen, De Wolden, a hamlet in the municipality of De Wolden in the Netherlands
- Witteveen, Midden-Drenthe, a village in the municipality of Midden-Drenthe in the Netherlands
- Witteveen-Kolk syndrome is a rare genetic disorder caused by mutation on the SIN3A gene in the long arm of chromosome 15
