= Cup Winners' Cup (disambiguation) =

Cup Winners' Cup may refer to:

- UEFA Cup Winners' Cup
- African Cup Winners' Cup
- Asian Cup Winners' Cup
- Arab Cup Winners' Cup
- CONCACAF Cup Winners Cup
- Oceania Cup Winners' Cup
- FIBA European Cup Winners' Cup
