= 1986 National Soccer League =

Australian soccer season

National Soccer League
- Season: 1986
- Dates: 1986
- Champions: Adelaide City; 1st title
- Premiers: Sydney Croatia (Northern); Brunswick Juventus (Southern)
- Top goalscorer: Graham Arnold (15)

The National Soccer League 1986 season was the tenth season of the National Soccer League in Australia. The season was again played with two Conferences as separate leagues, followed by a conference playoff final. The Grand Final was won by Adelaide City over Sydney Olympic.

== League tables ==
Northern Conference

Pos	Team	Pld	W	D	L	GF	GA	GD	Pts	Qualification or relegation
1	Sydney Croatia	22	14	4	4	43	18	+25	32	Qualification for the Finals series
2	Sydney Olympic	22	9	9	4	33	22	+11	27	Qualification for the Finals series
3	St George-Budapest	22	11	5	6	33	29	+4	27	Qualification for the Finals series
4	Marconi Fairfield	22	9	7	6	35	22	+13	25	Qualification for the Finals series
5	Sydney City	22	8	8	6	36	27	+9	24	Qualification for the Finals series and Oceania Cup Winners' Cup (Note: Sydney City qualified for the 1987 Oceania Cup Winners' Cup as the 1986 NSL Cup winners.)
6	Newcastle Rosebud United (R)	22	9	6	7	36	33	+3	24	Relegation to the 1987 NSW State League
7	APIA Leichhardt	22	9	6	7	25	23	+2	24	
8	Wollongong City (R)	22	9	5	8	26	25	+1	23	Relegation to the 1987 NSW State League
9	Blacktown City (R)	22	8	4	10	24	36	−12	20	Relegation to the 1987 NSW State League
10	Canberra City (R)	22	5	6	11	21	27	−6	16	Relegation to the 1987 NSW State League
11	Canterbury Marrickville (R)	22	2	7	13	17	41	−24	11	Relegation to the 1987 NSW State League
12	Inter Monaro (R)	22	3	5	14	17	43	−26	11	Relegation to the 1987 NSW State League

Updated to match(es) played on unknown. Source: rsssf.com
Rules for classification: 1) points; 2) goal difference; 3) number of goals scored.
(R) Relegated
Notes:

Southern Conference

Pos	Team	Pld	W	D	L	GF	GA	GD	Pts	Qualification or relegation
1	Brunswick Juventus	22	11	6	5	37	21	+16	28	Qualification for the Finals series
2	Footscray JUST	22	10	8	4	29	27	+2	28	Qualification for the Finals series
3	Adelaide City (C)	22	10	7	5	32	19	+13	27	Qualification for the Finals series and Oceania Club Championship
4	Sunshine George Cross	22	8	11	3	26	17	+9	27	Qualification for the Finals series
5	Heidelberg United	22	9	8	5	35	25	+10	26	Qualification for the Finals series
6	Preston Makedonia	22	8	9	5	30	20	+10	25	
7	South Melbourne	22	10	5	7	27	20	+7	25	
8	Brisbane Lions (R)	22	7	5	10	27	28	−1	19	Relegation to the 1987 Brisbane Premier League
9	West Adelaide (R)	22	7	4	11	26	34	−8	18	Relegation to the 1987 South Australian Division One
10	Melbourne Croatia	22	6	6	10	25	33	−8	18	
11	Brisbane City (R)	22	3	7	12	18	46	−28	13	Relegation to the 1987 Brisbane Premier League
12	Green Gully (R)	22	2	6	14	16	38	−22	10	Relegation to the 1987 Victorian State League

Updated to match(es) played on unknown. Source: rsssf.com
Rules for classification: 1) points; 2) goal difference; 3) number of goals scored.
(C) Champions; (R) Relegated

== Finals series ==
Northern Conference

Elimination and qualifying Finals
2	Sydney Olympic	0
3	St George-Budapest	1
4	Marconi Fairfield	3 (4)
5	Sydney City	3 (3)

Semi-finals
1	Sydney Croatia	0
3	St George-Budapest	3
2	Sydney Olympic	2
4	Marconi Fairfield	0

Preliminary Final
1	Sydney Croatia	3
2	Sydney Olympic	4

Northern Final
2	Sydney Olympic	3
3	St George-Budapest	2

Southern Conference

Elimination and qualifying Finals
2	Footscray JUST	2
3	Adelaide City	3
4	Sunshine George Cross	2
5	Heidelberg United	1

Semi-finals
1	Brunswick Juventus	0
3	Adelaide City	2
2	Footscray JUST	2
4	Sunshine George Cross	0

Preliminary Final
1	Brunswick Juventus	1
2	Footscray JUST	2

Southern Final
2	Footscray JUST	1
3	Adelaide City	2

=== Grand Final ===
First Leg
12 October 1986

Adelaide City	0–1	Sydney Olympic

Hindmarsh Stadium, Adelaide
Attendance: 12,232

Second Leg
19 October 1986

Sydney Olympic	1–3	Adelaide City

Parramatta Stadium, Sydney
Attendance: 14,032
- Adelaide City win 3–2 on aggregate

== Individual awards ==
- Referee's Player of the Year: Bobby Russell (South Melbourne)
- Player's Player of the Year: Graham Arnold (Sydney Croatia)
- U-21 Player of the Year: Ernie Tapai (Melbourne Croatia)
- Top Scorer(s): Graham Arnold (Sydney Croatia) 15 goals
- Coach of the Year: Drago Sekularic (Melbourne Croatia)
