= Witteveen =

Witteveen is a Dutch toponymic surname and may refer to the following people:

- Arthur Witteveen (b. 19??), Dutch judge and legal writer
- Axel Fernando Witteveen (born 1977), Argentine musician known by her stage name Axel
- Dave Witteveen (b. 19??), New Zealand association footballer
- David Witteveen (born 1985), Austrian football forward
- Gepke Witteveen (born 1951), Dutch actor and director
- Ivonne Witteveen (born 1944), Dutch Antillean fencer
- Johan Witteveen (1921–2019), Dutch Minister of Finance 1963–71, economist, and author
- Kees Witteveen (1871–1927), Dutch racing cyclist
- Lucien Witteveen (born 1969), Dutch rapper known as MC Miker G
- Merel Witteveen (born 1985), Dutch yacht racer
- Solange Witteveen (born 1976), Argentine high jumper
- Willem Witteveen (1952–2014), Dutch legal scholar, politician, and author
