= 1987 Oceania Club Championship =

Tournament details
- Dates: 6–15 March 1987
- Teams: 3

Final positions
- Champions: (Australia) Adelaide City (1st title)
- Runners-up: (New Zealand) Mount Wellington

Tournament statistics
- Matches played: 9
- Goals scored: 45 (5 per match)

The 1987 Oceania Club Championship (known as the Qantas Pacific Challenge Cup at the time) was held in March 1987 in Adelaide, Australia. Adelaide City defeated Mount Wellington.

== Teams ==
Location of teams of the 1987 Oceania Club Championship.

A total of 9 teams from 9 OFC member associations enter the competition.

- The highest ranked association (Australia) was awarded one berth directly into the final.
- The second highest ranked association (New Zealand) was awarded one berth into the semi-final.
- The third highest ranked association (Fiji) was awarded one berth into the qualifying tournament semi final.
- The remaining six associations (New Caledonia, Palau, Papua New Guinea, Solomon Islands, Tahiti, Vanuatu) are awarded one berth each in the qualifying tournament.

Association	Team	Qualifying method
Teams entering the Final
Australia	Adelaide City	1986 Australian National Soccer League champion
Teams entering the Semi-finals
(New Zealand) New Zealand	Mount Wellington	1986 New Zealand National Soccer League champion
Teams entering the Qualifying Tournament Semi-finals
Fiji	Ba	1986 Fiji National Football League champion
Teams entering the Qualifying Tournament Quarter-finals
(New Caledonia) New Caledonia	CA Saint-Louis	1987 New Caledonia Super Ligue champion
Palau	Koror	
(Papua New Guinea) Papua New Guinea	Guria	1986 Papua New Guinea Overall Championship champion
(Solomon Islands) Solomon Islands	Rangers Honiara	1986 Solomon Islands Honiara League champion
(French Polynesia) Tahiti	AS Jeunes Tahitiens	1987 Tahiti Ligue 1 champion
Vanuatu	Tafea	1986 Vanuatu Port Vila Football League champion

== Tournament ==
=== Bracket ===
Quarter-finals
6 March
(Solomon Islands) Rangers Honiara	2
(Papua New Guinea) Guria	0
6 March
(New Caledonia) CA Saint-Louis (a.e.t.)	4
(French Polynesia) AS Jeunes Tahitiens	3
7 March
(Vanuatu) Tafea	6
(Palau) Koror	2

Semi-finals
8 March
(Solomon Islands) Rangers Honiara (p)	2 (4)
(New Caledonia) CA Saint-Louis	2 (2)
8 March
(Fiji) Ba	3
(Vanuatu) Tafea	2

Qualifying final
10 March
(Solomon Islands) Rangers Honiara	0
(Fiji) Ba	3

Elimination final
12 March
(New Zealand) Mount Wellington	6
(Fiji) Ba	1

Final
15 March — Adelaide
(Australia) Adelaide City (p)	1 (4)
(New Zealand) Mount Wellington	1 (1)
Third place qualifying play-off
10 March
(New Caledonia) CA Saint-Louis	4
(Vanuatu) Tafea	2

== Final ==
15 March 1987

Adelaide City (Australia)	1–1	(New Zealand) Mount Wellington
Mullen 15'	Report	Whiteveen 20'
Penalties
	4–1

Hindmarsh Stadium, Adelaide
Attendance: 3,500
Referee: Don Campbell (Australia)

Adelaide City	Mount Wellington

Adelaide City:
Willie McNally
Paul Shillabeer
Bugsy Nyskohus
Neville Flounders
Alex Tobin
Adrian Santrac	(substituted off) 73'
Sergio Melta
Charlie Villani
Aurelio Vidmar
Paul Wilde
Joe Mullen
Substitutes:
Lemmy Vatsilas	(substituted on) 73'
Manager:
Zoran Matić

Mount Wellington:
Baker
Ricki Herbert
Keith Garland
Glen Adam
Ron Armstrong
Chris Riley
Grant Lightbown	(substituted off) 70'
Nigel Debenham	(substituted off) 88'
Ian Masson
Billy Wright
Dave Witteveen
Substitutes:
Peter Henry	(substituted on) 70'
Taylor	(substituted on) 88'
Manager:
Robert Patterson
