= Honiara Rangers F.C. =

Rangers FC
- Full name: Rangers Football Club Honiara
- Ground: Lawson Tama Stadium; Honiara
- Capacity: 20,000
- Manager: (Solomon Islands) Matai Vave
- League: Honiara FA League
Home colours

Rangers FC were a famous Solomon Islands football club, playing in the Honiara FA League and in the Solomon Islands National Club Championship.

Rangers FC won the Honiara FA League 8 times in: 1985, 1988, 1991, 1995, 1996, 1997, 1998 and 1999. The club has played once in the OFC Champions League, in the 1987.

== Titles ==
- Solomon Islands National Club Championship: (0)
- Honiara FA League: (8)

1985, 1988, 1991, 1995, 1996, 1997, 1998, 1999.

- Solomon Islands Cup: (0)

== Performance in OFC competitions ==
- OFC Champions League: 1 appearance

Best: Fourth place
1987: Fourth place

== Current squad ==
Note: Flags indicate national team as defined under FIFA eligibility rules; some limited exceptions apply. Players may hold more than one non-FIFA nationality.

No.	Pos.	Nation	Player
—			Leyon Hartbeam
—			Lava Vualiya
—			Daniel Vonraie
—			Marcus Lennon
—			Ali Ibramanjazy
—			James Wolloni
—			Hashem Marinakar
—			Alhassane Boubacar

No.	Pos.	Nation	Player
—			Mariano Lotbergh
—			Seati Liolo
—			Rijanjo Lemsick
—			Abdorno Kamayabi
—			Ronbanji Fataij
—			Ali Massar Wudhu Lanbanni
—			Olga Bassaraba
—			Hadi Ismaiyl

coach: Mohamad Mayelikohan
