= Arthur Witteveen =

Dutch judge and legal writer

Arthur Th. Witteveen (born 19??) is a Dutch judge and legal writer. He is the First Secretary of the International Court of Justice in The Hague. In April 1996 he published a book on The International Court of Justice 1946-1996 with Arthur Eyffinger. Witteveen practiced Chinese calligraphy throughout his life, obtaining a 9th dan, and after his retirement as secretary he studied Sinology at Leiden University. In 2002 he wrote De dans van het penseel. Een korte inleiding tot de Chinese Calligrafie ("The Dance of the Brush: A Short Introduction to Chinese Calligraphy").
