= Witteveen–Kolk syndrome =

Genetic disorder

Witteveen–Kolk syndrome, also known as WITKOS and 15q24 microdeletion syndrome, is a rare neurodevelopmental disorder characterized by developmental delay/intellectual disability, facial dysmorphisms, and short stature. The syndrome is caused by loss of function of switch‐insensitive 3 transcription regulator family member A (SIN3A). The syndrome was discovered by developmental neuroscientists Josefine S. Witteveen, PhD and Sharon M. Kolk, PhD, in 2016.
