= Japanese football clubs in Asian competitions =

Japanese football club

The Japan J.League clubs in Asian competitions. This details the participation and performances in the competition since its rebranding and reformatting in 2002 and excludes the details of the old AFC Club Championship.(This does not apply to the finalists) ، The first Japanese club to participate in the competition was Toyo Kogyo who won third place in the 1969 edition.

== Overview ==
=== Results ===
- PO: Play-off round, GS: Group Stage, R16: Round of 16, QF: Quarterfinals, SF: Semifinals, RU: Runners-Up, W: Winners

Team	Qualified	02–03	2004	2005	2006	2007	2008	2009	2010	2011	2012	2013	2014	2015	2016	2017	2018	2019	2020	2021	2022	23–24	24–25	25–26
Kawasaki Frontale	11 Times					QF		QF	GS				R16			QF	GS	GS		R16	GS	R16	RU	
Kashima Antlers	10 Times	GS					QF	R16	R16	R16				GS		R16	W	QF	PO					
Gamba Osaka	10 Times				GS		W	R16	R16	R16	GS			SF	GS	GS				GS				
Urawa Red Diamonds	9 Times					W	SF					GS		GS	R16	W		RU			W	GS		
Yokohama F. Marinos	7 Times		GS	GS									GS						R16		R16	RU	QF	
Sanfrecce Hiroshima	6 Times								GS			GS	R16		GS			R16						R16
Kashiwa Reysol	4 Times										R16	SF		QF			GS							
Nagoya Grampus	4 Times							SF		R16	R16										QF			
Cerezo Osaka	4 Times									QF			R16				GS				R16			
FC Tokyo	3 Times										R16				R16				R16					
Vissel Kobe	3 Times																		SF		QF		R16	SF
Júbilo Iwata	2 Times		GS	GS																				
Shimizu S-Pulse	1 Time	GS																						
Tokyo Verdy	1 Time				GS																			
Vegalta Sendai	1 Time											GS												
Ventforet Kofu	1 Time																						R16	
Machida Zelvia	1 Time																							RU

=== Finals ===
Performance by clubs in AFC Champions League finals
Club	Winners	Runners-up	Years won	Years runners-up
Urawa Red Diamonds	3	1	2007, 2017, 2022	2019
Gamba Osaka	1	0	2008	
Kashima Antlers	1	0	2018	

Performance by clubs in Asian Club Championship finals
Club	Winners	Runners-up	Years won	Years runners-up
Júbilo Iwata	1	2	1998–99	1999–2000, 2000–01
JEF United Chiba	1	0	1986	
Tokyo Verdy	1	0	1987	
Yokohama F. Marinos	0	1		1989–90

=== Statistics by club ===
Overall Statistics
#	Team	GP	W	D	L	GF	GA	GD	Pts	Best Finish
1	(Japan) Kashima Antlers	72	37	15	20	142	78	+64	126	Champions (2018)
2	(Japan) Gamba Osaka	75	33	17	25	147	97	+50	116	Champions (2008)
3	(Japan) Kawasaki Frontale	60	30	14	16	110	61	+49	104	Quarterfinals (3) (2007, 2009, 2017)
4	(Japan) Urawa Red Diamonds	64	27	18	19	100	72	+28	99	Champions (2) (2007, 2017)
5	(Japan) Nagoya Grampus	33	16	9	8	56	36	+20	57	Semifinals (2009)
6	(Japan) Sanfrecce Hiroshima	35	15	7	13	46	43	+3	52	Round of 16 (2) (2014, 2019)
7	(Japan) Cerezo Osaka	30	15	6	9	48	38	+10	51	Quarterfinals (2011)
8	(Japan) Kashiwa Reysol	35	14	9	12	62	54	+8	51	Semifinals (2013)
9	(Japan) Yokohama F. Marinos	25	15	2	8	51	25	+26	47	Round of 16 (2020)
10	(Japan) FC Tokyo	24	12	4	8	39	23	+16	40	Round of 16 (3) (2012, 2016, 2020)
11	(Japan) Júbilo Iwata	12	7	0	5	25	15	+10	21	Group stage (2) (2004, 2005)
12	(Japan) Vissel Kobe	7	3	1	3	8	8	0	10	Semifinals (2020)
13	(Japan) Vegalta Sendai	6	1	3	2	5	6	−1	6	Group stage (2013)
14	(Japan) Shimizu S-Pulse	3	1	1	1	8	2	+6	4	Group stage (2003)
15	(Japan) Tokyo Verdy	2	0	0	2	0	3	−3	0	Group stage (2006)
Total		483	226	106	151	847	561	+286	784	

Updated to 2021 season after Final

=== Statistics by season ===
Statistics By Seasons
Season	GP	W	D	L	GF	GA	GD	Pts
2002–03	6	1	2	3	13	9	+4	5
2004	12	9	0	3	33	14	+19	27
2005	12	7	0	5	21	8	+13	21
2006	8	3	1	4	26	10	+16	10
2007	20	10	10	0	35	15	+20	40
2008	24	15	5	4	62	23	+39	50
2009	34	19	6	9	72	44	+28	63
2010	26	14	3	9	44	31	+13	45
2011	30	15	5	10	48	35	+13	50
2012	27	9	7	11	40	35	+5	34
2013	30	10	11	9	41	40	+1	41
2014	30	13	6	11	42	44	−2	45
2015	34	13	7	14	55	53	+2	46
2016	29	11	6	12	41	34	+7	39
2017	38	19	7	12	71	45	+26	64
2018	32	10	11	11	43	41	+2	41
2019	40	19	9	12	56	37	+19	66
2020	23	11	3	9	31	23	+8	36
2021	28	18	7	3	73	20	+53	61
Total	483	226	106	151	847	561	+286	784

Updated to 2021 season after Final

=== AFC Champions League Elite ===
Team	Part	2024–25
Vissel Kobe	1	TBD
Sanfrecce Hiroshima	1	TBD
FC Machida Zelvia	1	TBD

== Games by club ==
Match won	Match drawn	Match lost

Updated to 2021 season after Final

=== Cerezo Osaka ===
(Japan) Cerezo Osaka Statistics
Round	GP	W	D	L	GF	GA	GD	Pts
Group Stage	24	12	6	6	40	23	+17	42
Knockout Stage	6	3	0	3	8	15	-7	9
Total	30	15	6	9	48	38	+10	51

Cerezo Osaka Results
Season	Round	Results	Opposing Team	Venue
2011	Group Round			
2011	Group Round	2–1	(Indonesia) Arema FC	Osaka, Japan
2011	Group Round	0–2	(China) Shandong Luneng	Jinan, China
2011	Group Round	1–0	(South Korea) Jeonbuk Hyundai Motors	Osaka, Japan
2011	Group Round	0–1	(South Korea) Jeonbuk Hyundai Motors	Jeonju, Korea
2011	Group Round	4–0	(Indonesia) Arema FC	Malang, Indonesia
2011	Group Round	4–0	(China) Shandong Luneng	Osaka, Japan
2011	Round of 16			
2011	Round of 16	1–0	(Japan) Gamba Osaka	Suita, Japan
2011	Quarterfinal			
2011	Quarterfinal	4–3	(South Korea) Jeonbuk Hyundai Motors	Osaka, Japan
2011	Quarterfinal	1–6	(South Korea) Jeonbuk Hyundai Motors	Jeonju, Korea
2014	Group Round			
2014	Group Round	1–1	(South Korea) Pohang Steelers	Pohang, Korea
2014	Group Round	1–3	(China) Shandong Luneng	Osaka, Japan
2014	Group Round	4–0	(Thailand) Buriram United	Osaka, Japan
2014	Group Round	2–2	(Thailand) Buriram United	Buriram, Thailand
2014	Group Round	0–2	(South Korea) Pohang Steelers	Osaka, Japan
2014	Group Round	2–1	(China) Shandong Luneng	Jinan, China
2014	Round of 16			
2014	Round of 16	1–5	(China) Guangzhou Evergrande	Osaka, Japan
2014	Round of 16	1–0	(China) Guangzhou Evergrande	Guangzhou, China
2018	Group Round			
2018	Group Round	1–0	(South Korea) Jeju United	Jeju, Korea
2018	Group Round	0–0	(China) Guangzhou Evergrande	Osaka, Japan
2018	Group Round	0–2	(Thailand) Buriram United	Buriram, Thailand
2018	Group Round	2–2	(Thailand) Buriram United	Osaka, Japan
2018	Group Round	2–1	(South Korea) Jeju United	Osaka, Japan
2018	Group Round	1–3	(China) Guangzhou Evergrande	Guangzhou, China
2021	Group Round			
2021	Group Round	2–0	(China) Guangzhou	Buriram, Thailand
2021	Group Round	2–1	(Hong Kong) Kitchee	Buriram, Thailand
2021	Group Round	1–1	(Thailand) Port	Buriram, Thailand
2021	Group Round	3–0	(Thailand) Port	Buriram, Thailand
2021	Group Round	5–0	(China) Guangzhou	Buriram, Thailand
2021	Group Round	0–0	(Hong Kong) Kitchee	Buriram, Thailand
2021	Round of 16			
2021	Round of 16	0–1	(South Korea) Pohang Steelers	Osaka, Japan

=== FC Tokyo ===
(Japan) FC Tokyo Statistics
Round	GP	W	D	L	GF	GA	GD	Pts
Play-off Round	2	2	0	0	11	0	+11	6
Group Stage	18	9	4	5	26	19	+7	31
Knockout Stage	4	1	0	3	2	4	-2	3
Total	24	12	4	8	39	23	+16	40

FC Tokyo Results
Season	Round	Results	Opposing Team	Venue
2012	Group Round			
2012	Group Round	2–0	(Australia) Brisbane Roar	Brisbane, Australia
2012	Group Round	2–2	(South Korea) Ulsan Hyundai	Tokyo, Japan
2012	Group Round	1–1	(China) Beijing Guoan	Beijing, China
2012	Group Round	3–0	(China) Beijing Guoan	Tokyo, Japan
2012	Group Round	4–2	(Australia) Brisbane Roar	Tokyo, Japan
2012	Group Round	0–1	(South Korea) Ulsan Hyundai	Ulsan, Korea
2012	Round of 16			
2012	Round of 16	0–1	(China) Guangzhou Evergrande	Guangzhou, China
2016	Play-off round			
2016	Play-off round	9–0	(Thailand) Chonburi	Tokyo, Japan
2016	Group Round			
2016	Group Round	1–2	(South Korea) Jeonbuk Hyundai Motors	Jeonju, Korea
2016	Group Round	3–1	(Vietnam) Becamex Binh Duong	Tokyo, Japan
2016	Group Round	0–0	(China) Jiangsu Suning	Tokyo, Japan
2016	Group Round	2–1	(China) Jiangsu Suning	Nanjing, China
2016	Group Round	0–3	(South Korea) Jeonbuk Hyundai Motors	Tokyo, Japan
2016	Group Round	2–1	(Vietnam) Becamex Binh Duong	Thủ Dầu Một, Vietnam
2016	Round of 16			
2016	Round of 16	2–1	(China) Shanghai SIPG	Tokyo, Japan
2016	Round of 16	0–1	(China) Shanghai SIPG	Shanghai, China
2020	Play-off round			
2020	Play-off round	2–0	(Philippines) Ceres–Negros	Tokyo, Japan
2020	Group Round			
2020	Group Round	1–1	(South Korea) Ulsan Hyundai	Ulsan, Korea
2020	Group Round	1–0	(Australia) Perth Glory	Tokyo, Japan
2020	Group Round	0–1	(China) Shanghai Shenhua	Doha, Qatar
2020	Group Round	2–1	(China) Shanghai Shenhua	Doha, Qatar
2020	Group Round	1–2	(South Korea) Ulsan Hyundai	Doha, Qatar
2020	Group Round	1–0	(Australia) Perth Glory	Doha, Qatar
2020	Round of 16			
2020	Round of 16	0–1	(China) Beijing FC	Doha, Qatar

=== Gamba Osaka ===
(Japan) Gamba Osaka Statistics
Round	GP	W	D	L	GF	GA	GD	Pts
Group Stage	60	25	14	21	122	80	+42	89
Knockout Stage	15	8	3	4	25	17	+8	27
Total	75	33	17	25	147	97	+50	116

Gamba Osaka Results
Season	Round	Results	Opposing Team	Venue
2006	Group Round			
2006	Group Round	2–3	(South Korea) Jeonbuk Motors	Jeonju, Korea
2006	Group Round	15–0	(Vietnam) Da Nang F.C.	Suita, Japan
2006	Group Round	3–0	(China) Dalian Shide	Suita, Japan
2006	Group Round	0–2	(China) Dalian Shide	Dalian, China
2006	Group Round	1–1	(South Korea) Jeonbuk Motors	Suita, Japan
2006	Group Round	5–1	(Vietnam) Da Nang F.C.	Da Nang, Vietnam
2008	Group Round			
2008	Group Round	1–1	(Thailand) Chonburi FC	Suita, Japan
2008	Group Round	4–3	(South Korea) Chunnam Dragons	Gwangyang, Korea
2008	Group Round	4–3	(Australia) Melbourne Victory	Melbourne, Australia
2008	Group Round	2–0	(Australia) Melbourne Victory	Suita, Japan
2008	Group Round	2–0	(Thailand) Chonburi FC	Bangkok, Thailand
2008	Group Round	1–1	(South Korea) Chunnam Dragons	Suita, Japan
2008	Quarterfinal			
2008	Quarterfinal	2–1	(Syria) Al-Karamah	Homs, Syria
2008	Quarterfinal	2–0	(Syria) Al-Karamah	Suita, Japan
2008	Semifinal			
2008	Semifinal	1–1	(Japan) Urawa Red Diamonds	Suita, Japan
2008	Semifinal	3–1	(Japan) Urawa Red Diamonds	Saitama, Japan
2008	Final			
2008	Final	3–0	(Australia) Adelaide United	Suita, Japan
2008	Final	2–0	(Australia) Adelaide United	Adelaide, Australia
2009	Group Round			
2009	Group Round	3–0	(China) Shandong Luneng	Suita, Japan
2009	Group Round	4–2	(South Korea) FC Seoul	Seoul, Korea
2009	Group Round	5–0	(Indonesia) Sriwijaya	Suita, Japan
2009	Group Round	3–0	(Indonesia) Sriwijaya	Palembang, Indonesia
2009	Group Round	1–0	(China) Shandong Luneng	Jinan, China
2009	Group Round	1–2	(South Korea) FC Seoul	Suita, Japan
2009	Round of 16			
2009	Round of 16	2–3	(Japan) Kawasaki Frontale	Suita, Japan
2010	Group Round			
2010	Group Round	0–0	(South Korea) Suwon Samsung Bluewings	Suwon, Korea
2010	Group Round	1–1	(China) Henan Construction	Suita, Japan
2010	Group Round	4–2	Singapore Armed Forces	Singapore
2010	Group Round	3–0	Singapore Armed Forces	Suita, Japan
2010	Group Round	2–1	(South Korea) Suwon Samsung Bluewings	Suita, Japan
2010	Group Round	1–1	(China) Henan Construction	Zhengzhou, China
2010	Round of 16			
2010	Round of 16	0–3	(South Korea) Seongnam Ilhwa Chunma	Seongnam, Korea
2011	Group Round			
2011	Group Round	5–1	(Australia) Melbourne Victory	Suita, Japan
2011	Group Round	1–2	(China) Tianjin Teda	Tianjin, China
2011	Group Round	1–2	(South Korea) Jeju United	Jeju, Korea
2011	Group Round	3–1	(South Korea) Jeju United	Suita, Japan
2011	Group Round	1–1	(Australia) Melbourne Victory	Melbourne, Australia
2011	Group Round	2–0	(China) Tianjin Teda	Suita, Japan
2011	Round of 16			
2011	Round of 16	0–1	(Japan) Cerezo Osaka	Suita, Japan
2012	Group Round			
2012	Group Round	0–3	(South Korea) Pohang Steelers	Suita, Japan
2012	Group Round	0–2	(Australia) Adelaide United	Adelaide, Australia
2012	Group Round	3–1	(Uzbekistan) Bunyodkor	Suita, Japan
2012	Group Round	2–3	(Uzbekistan) Bunyodkor	Tashkent, Uzbekistan
2012	Group Round	0–2	(South Korea) Pohang Steelers	Pohang, Korea
2012	Group Round	0–2	(Australia) Adelaide United	Suita, Japan
2015	Group Round			
2015	Group Round	0–2	(China) Guangzhou R&F	Suita, Japan
2015	Group Round	0–2	(South Korea) Seongnam FC	Seongnam, Korea
2015	Group Round	1–1	(Thailand) Buriram United	Suita, Japan
2015	Group Round	2–1	(Thailand) Buriram United	Buriram, Thailand
2015	Group Round	5–0	(China) Guangzhou R&F	Guangzhou, China
2015	Group Round	2–1	(South Korea) Seongnam FC	Suita, Japan
2015	Round of 16			
2015	Round of 16	3–1	(South Korea) FC Seoul	Seoul, Korea
2015	Round of 16	3–2	(South Korea) FC Seoul	Suita, Japan
2015	Quarterfinal			
2015	Quarterfinal	0–0	(South Korea) Jeonbuk Hyundai Motors	Jeonju, Korea
2015	Quarterfinal	3–2	(South Korea) Jeonbuk Hyundai Motors	Suita, Japan
2015	Semifinal			
2015	Semifinal	1–2	(China) Guangzhou Evergrande	Guangzhou, China
2015	Semifinal	0–0	(China) Guangzhou Evergrande	Suita, Japan
2016	Group Round			
2016	Group Round	0–0	(South Korea) Suwon Samsung Bluewings	Suwon, Korea
2016	Group Round	1–1	(Australia) Melbourne Victory	Suita, Japan
2016	Group Round	1–2	(China) Shanghai SIPG	Shanghai, China
2016	Group Round	0–2	(China) Shanghai SIPG	Suita, Japan
2016	Group Round	1–2	(South Korea) Suwon Samsung Bluewings	Suita, Japan
2016	Group Round	1–2	(Australia) Melbourne Victory	Melbourne, Australia
2017	Group Round			
2017	Group Round	3–0	(Australia) Adelaide United	Adelaide, Australia
2017	Group Round	1–4	(South Korea) Jeju United	Suita, Japan
2017	Group Round	0–1	(China) Jiangsu Suning	Suita, Japan
2017	Group Round	0–3	(China) Jiangsu Suning	Nanjing, China
2017	Group Round	3–3	(Australia) Adelaide United	Suita, Japan
2017	Group Round	0–2	(South Korea) Jeju United	Jeju, Korea
2021	Group Round			
2021	Group Round	2–0	(Singapore) Tampines Rovers	Tashkent, Uzbekistan
2021	Group Round	2–2	(South Korea) Jeonbuk Hyundai Motors	Tashkent, Uzbekistan
2021	Group Round	1–1	(Thailand) Chiangrai United	Tashkent, Uzbekistan
2021	Group Round	1–1	(Thailand) Chiangrai United	Tashkent, Uzbekistan
2021	Group Round	8–1	(Singapore) Tampines Rovers	Tashkent, Uzbekistan
2021	Group Round	1–2	(South Korea) Jeonbuk Hyundai Motors	Tashkent, Uzbekistan

=== Júbilo Iwata ===
(Japan) Júbilo Iwata Statistics
Round	GP	W	D	L	GF	GA	GD	Pts
Group Stage	12	7	0	5	25	15	+10	21
Knockout Stage	-	-	-	-	-	-	-	-
Total	12	7	0	5	25	15	+10	21

Júbilo Iwata Results
Season	Round	Results	Opposing Team	Venue
2004	Group Stage			
2004	Group Stage	2–1	(South Korea) Jeonbuk Motors	Jeonju, Korea
2004	Group Stage	3–0	(Thailand) BEC Tero Sasana FC	Iwata, Japan
2004	Group Stage	2–1	(China) Shanghai Shenhua	Iwata, Japan
2004	Group Stage	2–3	(China) Shanghai Shenhua	Shanghai, China
2004	Group Stage	2–4	(South Korea) Jeonbuk Motors	Iwata, Japan
2004	Group Stage	3–2	(Thailand) BEC Tero Sasana FC	Bangkok, Thailand
2005	Group Stage			
2005	Group Stage	0–1	(China) Shenzhen Jianlibao	Shenzhen, China
2005	Group Stage	6–0	(Vietnam) Hoang Anh Gia Lai	Iwata, Japan
2005	Group Stage	0–1	(South Korea) Suwon Bluewings	Iwata, Japan
2005	Group Stage	1–2	(South Korea) Suwon Bluewings	Suwon, Korea
2005	Group Stage	3–0	(China) Shenzhen Jianlibao	Iwata, Japan
2005	Group Stage	1–0	(Vietnam) Hoang Anh Gia Lai	Pleiku, Vietnam

=== Kashima Antlers ===
(Japan) Kashima Antlers Statistics
Round	GP	W	D	L	GF	GA	GD	Pts
Play-off Round	2	1	0	1	4	2	+2	3
Group Stage	51	29	9	13	112	54	+58	96
Knockout Stage	19	7	6	6	26	22	+4	27
Total	72	37	15	20	142	78	+64	126

Kashima Antlers Results
Season	Round	Results	Opposing Team	Venue
2003	Group Stage			
2003	Group Stage	2–2	(Thailand) BEC Tero Sasana FC	Bangkok, Thailand
2003	Group Stage	3–4	(China) Shanghai Shenhua	Bangkok, Thailand
2003	Group Stage	0–1	(South Korea) Daejeon Citizen	Bangkok, Thailand
2008	Group Stage			
2008	Group Stage	9–1	(Thailand) Krung Thai Bank FC	Bangkok, Thailand
2008	Group Stage	6–0	(Vietnam) Nam Dinh F.C.	Kashima, Japan
2008	Group Stage	1–0	(China) Beijing Guoan	Kashima, Japan
2008	Group Stage	0–1	(China) Beijing Guoan	Beijing, China
2008	Group Stage	8–1	(Thailand) Krung Thai Bank FC	Kashima, Japan
2008	Group Stage	4–0	(Vietnam) Nam Dinh F.C.	Hanoi, Vietnam
2008	Quarterfinal			
2008	Quarterfinal	1–1	(Australia) Adelaide United FC	Kashima, Japan
2008	Quarterfinal	0–1	(Australia) Adelaide United FC	Adelaide, Australia
2009	Group Stage			
2009	Group Stage	1–4	(South Korea) Suwon Bluewings	Suwon, Korea
2009	Group Stage	2–0	(China) Shanghai Shenhua	Kashima, Japan
2009	Group Stage	4–1	Singapore Armed Forces	Singapore
2009	Group Stage	5–0	Singapore Armed Forces	Kashima, Japan
2009	Group Stage	3–0	(South Korea) Suwon Bluewings	Kashima, Japan
2009	Group Stage	1–1	(China) Shanghai Shenhua	Shanghai, China
2009	Round of 16			
2009	Round of 16	2–2(4–5 p)	(South Korea) FC Seoul	Kashima, Japan
2010	Group Stage			
2010	Group Stage	1–0	(China) Changchun Yatai	Kashima, Japan
2010	Group Stage	2–1	(South Korea) Jeonbuk Hyundai Motors	Jeonju, Korea
2010	Group Stage	5–0	(Indonesia) Persipura Jayapura	Kashima, Japan
2010	Group Stage	3–1	(Indonesia) Persipura Jayapura	Jakarta, Indonesia
2010	Group Stage	1–0	(China) Changchun Yatai	Changchun, China
2010	Group Stage	2–1	(South Korea) Jeonbuk Hyundai Motors	Kashima, Japan
2010	Round of 16			
2010	Round of 16	0–1	(South Korea) Pohang Steelers	Kashima, Japan
2011	Group Stage			
2011	Group Stage	0–0	(China) Shanghai Shenhua	Shanghai, China
2011	Group Stage	1–1	(South Korea) Suwon Samsung Bluewings	Suwon, Korea
2011	Group Stage	3–0	(Australia) Sydney FC	Sydney, Australia
2011	Group Stage	1–1	(South Korea) Suwon Samsung Bluewings	Tokyo, Japan
2011	Group Stage	2–0	(China) Shanghai Shenhua	Tokyo, Japan
2011	Group Stage	2–1	(Australia) Sydney FC	Tokyo, Japan
2011	Round of 16			
2011	Round of 16	0–3	(South Korea) FC Seoul	Seoul, Korea
2015	Group Stage			
2015	Group Stage	1–3	(Australia) Western Sydney Wanderers	Kashima, Japan
2015	Group Stage	0–1	(South Korea) FC Seoul	Seoul, Korea
2015	Group Stage	3–4	(China) Guangzhou Evergrande Taobao	Guangzhou, China
2015	Group Stage	2–1	(China) Guangzhou Evergrande Taobao	Kashima, Japan
2015	Group Stage	2–1	(Australia) Western Sydney Wanderers	Sydney, Australia
2015	Group Stage	2–3	(South Korea) FC Seoul	Kashima, Japan
2017	Group Stage			
2017	Group Stage	2–0	(South Korea) Ulsan Hyundai	Kashima, Japan
2017	Group Stage	1–2	(Thailand) Muangthong United	Bangkok, Thailand
2017	Group Stage	3–0	(Australia) Brisbane Roar	Kashima, Japan
2017	Group Stage	1–2	(Australia) Brisbane Roar	Brisbane, Australia
2017	Group Stage	4–0	(South Korea) Ulsan Hyundai	Ulsan, South Korea
2017	Group Stage	2–1	(Thailand) Muangthong United	Kashima, Japan
2017	Round of 16			
2017	Round of 16	0–1	(China) Guangzhou Evergrande Taobao	Guangzhou, China
2017	Round of 16	2–1 (a)	(China) Guangzhou Evergrande Taobao	Kashima, Japan
2018	Group Stage			
2018	Group Stage	1–1	(China) Shanghai Shenhua	Kashima, Japan
2018	Group Stage	2–1	(South Korea) Suwon Samsung Bluewings	Suwon, Korea
2018	Group Stage	2–0	(Australia) Sydney FC	Sydney, Australia
2018	Group Stage	1–1	(Australia) Sydney FC	Kashima, Japan
2018	Group Stage	2–2	(China) Shanghai Shenhua	Shanghai, China
2018	Group Stage	0–1	(South Korea) Suwon Samsung Bluewings	Kashima, Japan
2018	Round of 16			
2018	Round of 16	3–1	(China) Shanghai SIPG	Kashima, Japan
2018	Round of 16	1–2	(China) Shanghai SIPG	Shanghai, China
2018	Quarterfinal			
2018	Quarterfinal	2–0	(China) Tianjin Quanjian	Kashima, Japan
2018	Quarterfinal	3–0	(China) Tianjin Quanjian	Macau, China
2018	Semifinal			
2018	Semifinal	3–2	(South Korea) Suwon Samsung Bluewings	Kashima, Japan
2018	Semifinal	3–3	(South Korea) Suwon Samsung Bluewings	Suwon, Korea
2018	Final			
2018	Final	2–0	(Iran) Persepolis	Kashima, Japan
2018	Final	0–0	(Iran) Persepolis	Tehran, Iran
2019	Play-off Round			
2019	Play-off Round	4–1	(Australia) Newcastle Jets	Kashima, Japan
2019	Group Stage			
2019	Group Stage	2–1	(Malaysia) Johor Darul Ta'zim	Kashima, Japan
2019	Group Stage	2–2	(China) Shandong Luneng	Jinan, China
2019	Group Stage	3–2	(South Korea) Gyeongnam FC	Changwon, Korea
2019	Group Stage	0–1	(South Korea) Gyeongnam FC	Kashima, Japan
2019	Group Stage	0–1	(Malaysia) Johor Darul Ta'zim	Johor Bahru, Malaysia
2019	Group Stage	2–1	(China) Shandong Luneng	Kashima, Japan
2019	Round of 16			
2019	Round of 16	1–0	(Japan) Sanfrecce Hiroshima	Kashima, Japan
2019	Round of 16	2–3 (a)	(Japan) Sanfrecce Hiroshima	Hiroshima, Japan
2019	Quarterfinal			
2019	Quarterfinal	0–0	(China) Guangzhou Evergrande Taobao	Guangzhou, China
2019	Quarterfinal	1–1 (a)	(China) Guangzhou Evergrande Taobao	Kashima, Japan
2020	Play-off Round			
2020	Play-off Round	0–1	(Australia) Melbourne Victory	Kashima, Japan

=== Kashiwa Reysol ===
(Japan) Kashiwa Reysol Statistics
Round	GP	W	D	L	GF	GA	GD	Pts
Group Stage	24	11	6	7	45	30	+15	39
Knockout Stage	11	3	3	5	17	24	-7	12
Total	35	14	9	12	62	54	+8	51

Kashiwa Reysol Results
Season	Round	Results	Opposing Team	Venue
2012	Group Round			
2012	Group Round	2–3	(Thailand) Buriram United	Buriram, Thailand
2012	Group Round	5–1	(South Korea) Jeonbuk Hyundai Motors	Kashiwa, Japan
2012	Group Round	0–0	(China) Guangzhou Evergrande	Kashiwa, Japan
2012	Group Round	1–3	(China) Guangzhou Evergrande	Guangzhou, China
2012	Group Round	1–0	(Thailand) Buriram United	Kashiwa, Japan
2012	Group Round	2–0	(South Korea) Jeonbuk Hyundai Motors	Jeonju, Korea
2012	Round of 16			
2012	Round of 16	2–3	(South Korea) Ulsan Hyundai	Ulsan, Korea
2013	Group Round			
2013	Group Round	1–0	(China) Guizhou Renhe	Guiyang, China
2013	Group Round	3–1	(Australia) Central Coast Mariners	Kashiwa, Japan
2013	Group Round	6–2	(South Korea) Suwon Samsung Bluewings	Suwon, Korea
2013	Group Round	0–0	(South Korea) Suwon Samsung Bluewings	Kashiwa, Japan
2013	Group Round	1–1	(China) Guizhou Renhe	Kashiwa, Japan
2013	Group Round	3–0	(Australia) Central Coast Mariners	Gosford, Australia
2013	Round of 16			
2013	Round of 16	2–0	(South Korea) Jeonbuk Hyundai Motors	Jeonju, Korea
2013	Round of 16	3–2	(South Korea) Jeonbuk Hyundai Motors	Kashiwa, Japan
2013	Quarterfinal			
2013	Quarterfinal	1–1	(Saudi Arabia) Al Shabab	Kashiwa, Japan
2013	Quarterfinal	2–2	(Saudi Arabia) Al Shabab	Riyadh, Saudi Arabia
2013	Semifinal			
2013	Semifinal	1–4	(China) Guangzhou Evergrande	Kashiwa, Japan
2013	Semifinal	0–4	(China) Guangzhou Evergrande	Guangzhou, China
2015	Group Round			
2015	Group Round	0–0	(South Korea) Jeonbuk Hyundai Motors	Jeonju, Korea
2015	Group Round	5–1	(Vietnam) Becamex Binh Duong	Kashiwa, Japan
2015	Group Round	2–1	(China) Shandong Luneng	Kashiwa, Japan
2015	Group Round	4–4	(China) Shandong Luneng	Jinan, China
2015	Group Round	3–2	(South Korea) Jeonbuk Hyundai Motors	Kashiwa, Japan
2015	Group Round	0–1	(Vietnam) Becamex Binh Duong	Thủ Dầu Một, Vietnam
2015	Round of 16			
2015	Round of 16	3–2	(South Korea) Suwon Samsung Bluewings	Suwon, Korea
2015	Round of 16	1–2	(South Korea) Suwon Samsung Bluewings	Kashiwa, Japan
2015	Quarterfinal			
2015	Quarterfinal	1–3	(China) Guangzhou Evergrande	Kashiwa, Japan
2015	Quarterfinal	1–1	(China) Guangzhou Evergrande	Guangzhou, China
2018	Group Round			
2018	Group Round	2–3	(South Korea) Jeonbuk Hyundai Motors	Jeonju, Korea
2018	Group Round	1–1	(China) Tianjin Quanjian	Kashiwa, Japan
2018	Group Round	1–0	(Hong Kong) Kitchee	Kashiwa, Japan
2018	Group Round	0–1	(Hong Kong) Kitchee	Hong Kong,
2018	Group Round	0–2	(South Korea) Jeonbuk Hyundai Motors	Kashiwa, Japan
2018	Group Round	2–3	(China) Tianjin Quanjian	Tianjin, China

=== Kawasaki Frontale ===
(Japan) Kawasaki Frontale Statistics
Round	GP	W	D	L	GF	GA	GD	Pts
Play-off Round	-	-	-	-	-	-	-	-
Group Stage	48	24	11	13	89	44	+45	83
Knockout Stage	12	6	3	3	21	17	+4	21
Total	60	30	14	16	110	61	+49	104

Kawasaki Frontale Results
Season	Round	Results	Opposing Team	Venue
2007	Group Stage			
2007	Group Stage	3–1	(Indonesia) Arema Malang	Malang, Indonesia
2007	Group Stage	1–1	(Thailand) Bangkok University	Kawasaki, Japan
2007	Group Stage	3–1	(South Korea) Chunnam Dragons	Gwangyang, Korea
2007	Group Stage	3–0	(South Korea) Chunnam Dragons	Kawasaki, Japan
2007	Group Stage	3–0	(Indonesia) Arema Malang	Kawasaki, Japan
2007	Group Stage	2–1	(Thailand) Bangkok University	Bangkok, Thailand
2007	Quarterfinal			
2007	Quarterfinal	0–0	(Iran) Sepahan	Isfahan, Iran
2007	Quarterfinal	0–0 (4–5 p)	(Iran) Sepahan	Kawasaki, Japan
2009	Group Stage			
2009	Group Stage	1–0	(China) Tianjin Teda	Kawasaki, Japan
2009	Group Stage	1–1	(South Korea) Pohang Steelers	Pohang, Korea
2009	Group Stage	5–0	(Australia) Central Coast Mariners	Gosford, Australia
2009	Group Stage	2–1	(Australia) Central Coast Mariners	Kawasaki, Japan
2009	Group Stage	1–3	(China) Tianjin Teda	Tianjin, China
2009	Group Stage	0–2	(South Korea) Pohang Steelers	Kawasaki, Japan
2009	Round of 16			
2009	Round of 16	3–2	(Japan) Gamba Osaka	Suita, Japan
2009	Quarterfinal			
2009	Quarterfinal	2–1	(Japan) Nagoya Grampus	Tokyo, Japan
2009	Quarterfinal	1–3	(Japan) Nagoya Grampus	Nagoya, Japan
2010	Group Stage			
2010	Group Stage	0–2	(South Korea) Seongnam Ilhwa Chunma	Seongnam, Korea
2010	Group Stage	1–3	(China) Beijing Guoan	Kawasaki, Japan
2010	Group Stage	4–0	(Australia) Melbourne Victory	Kawasaki, Japan
2010	Group Stage	0–1	(Australia) Melbourne Victory	Melbourne, Australia
2010	Group Stage	3–0	(South Korea) Seongnam Ilhwa Chunma	Kawasaki, Japan
2010	Group Stage	0–2	(China) Beijing Guoan	Beijing, China
2014	Group Stage			
2014	Group Stage	1–0	(China) Guizhou Renhe	Kawasaki, Japan
2014	Group Stage	0–2	(South Korea) Ulsan Hyundai	Ulsan, Korea
2014	Group Stage	0–1	(Australia) Western Sydney Wanderers	Sydney, Australia
2014	Group Stage	2–1	(Australia) Western Sydney Wanderers	Kawasaki, Japan
2014	Group Stage	1–0	(China) Guizhou Renhe	Guiyang, China
2014	Group Stage	3–1	(South Korea) Ulsan Hyundai	Kawasaki, Japan
2014	Round of 16			
2014	Round of 16	2–3	(South Korea) FC Seoul	Kawasaki, Japan
2014	Round of 16	2–1 (a)	(South Korea) FC Seoul	Seoul, Korea
2017	Group Stage			
2017	Group Stage	1–1	(South Korea) Suwon Samsung Bluewings	Kawasaki, Japan
2017	Group Stage	1–1	(Hong Kong) Eastern	Hong Kong, China
2017	Group Stage	1–1	(China) Guangzhou Evergrande Taobao	Guangzhou, China
2017	Group Stage	0–0	(China) Guangzhou Evergrande Taobao	Kawasaki, Japan
2017	Group Stage	1–0	(South Korea) Suwon Samsung Bluewings	Suwon, Korea
2017	Group Stage	4–0	(Hong Kong) Eastern	Kawasaki, Japan
2017	Round of 16			
2017	Round of 16	3–1	(Thailand) Muangthong United	Nonthaburi, Thailand
2017	Round of 16	4–1	(Thailand) Muangthong United	Kawasaki, Japan
2017	Quarterfinal			
2017	Quarterfinal	3–1	(Japan) Urawa Red Diamonds	Kawasaki, Japan
2017	Quarterfinal	1–4	(Japan) Urawa Red Diamonds	Saitama, Japan
2018	Group Stage			
2018	Group Stage	0–1	(China) Shanghai SIPG	Kawasaki, Japan
2018	Group Stage	1–2	(South Korea) Ulsan Hyundai	Ulsan, Korea
2018	Group Stage	2–2	(Australia) Melbourne Victory	Kawasaki, Japan
2018	Group Stage	0–1	(Australia) Melbourne Victory	Sydney, Australia
2018	Group Stage	1–1	(China) Shanghai SIPG	Shanghai, China
2018	Group Stage	2–2	(South Korea) Ulsan Hyundai	Kawasaki, Japan
2019	Group Stage			
2019	Group Stage	0–1	(China) Shanghai SIPG	Shanghai, China
2019	Group Stage	1–0	(Australia) Sydney FC	Kawasaki, Japan
2019	Group Stage	0–1	(South Korea) Ulsan Hyundai	Ulsan, Korea
2019	Group Stage	2–2	(South Korea) Ulsan Hyundai	Kawasaki, Japan
2019	Group Stage	1–1	(China) Shanghai SIPG	Shanghai, China
2019	Group Stage	4–0	(Australia) Sydney FC	Sydney, Australia
2021	Group Stage			
2021	Group Stage	3–2	(South Korea) Daegu FC	Tashkent, Uzbekistan
2021	Group Stage	7–0	(China) Beijing Guoan	Tashkent, Uzbekistan
2021	Group Stage	8–0	(Philippines) United City	Tashkent, Uzbekistan
2021	Group Stage	2–0	(Philippines) United City	Tashkent, Uzbekistan
2021	Group Stage	3–1	(South Korea) Daegu FC	Tashkent, Uzbekistan
2021	Group Stage	4–0	(China) Beijing Guoan	Tashkent, Uzbekistan
2021	Round of 16			
2021	Round of 16	0–0 (2–3 p)	(South Korea) Ulsan Hyundai	Ulsan, Korea

=== Nagoya Grampus ===
(Japan) Nagoya Grampus Statistics
Round	GP	W	D	L	GF	GA	GD	Pts
Group Stage	24	13	9	2	43	16	+27	48
Knockout Stage	9	3	0	6	13	20	-7	9
Total	33	16	9	8	56	36	+20	57

Nagoya Grampus Results
Season	Round	Results	Opposing Team	Venue
2009	Group Round			
2009	Group Round	3–1	(South Korea) Ulsan Hyundai Horang-i	Ulsan, Korea
2009	Group Round	0–0	(China) Beijing Guoan	Nagoya, Japan
2009	Group Round	1–1	(Australia) Newcastle United Jets	Nagoya, Japan
2009	Group Round	1–0	(Australia) Newcastle United Jets	Newcastle, Australia
2009	Group Round	4–1	(South Korea) Ulsan Hyundai Horang-i	Nagoya, Japan
2009	Group Round	1–1	(China) Beijing Guoan	Beijing, China
2009	Round of 16			
2009	Round of 16	2–1	(South Korea) Suwon Bluewings	Nagoya, Japan
2009	Quarterfinal			
2009	Quarterfinal	1–2	(Japan) Kawasaki Frontale	Tokyo, Japan
2009	Quarterfinal	3–1	(Japan) Kawasaki Frontale	Nagoya, Japan
2009	Semifinal			
2009	Semifinal	2–6	(Saudi Arabia) Al-Ittihad	Jeddah, Saudi Arabia
2009	Semifinal	1–2	(Saudi Arabia) Al-Ittihad	Nagoya, Japan
2011	Group Round			
2011	Group Round	0–2	(China) Hangzhou Greentown	Hangzhou, China
2011	Group Round	1–1	(South Korea) FC Seoul	Nagoya, Japan
2011	Group Round	4–0	(United Arab Emirates) Al-Ain	Nagoya, Japan
2011	Group Round	2–0	(South Korea) FC Seoul	Seoul, Korea
2011	Group Round	1–0	(China) Hangzhou Greentown	Nagoya, Japan
2011	Group Round	1–3	(United Arab Emirates) Al-Ain	Al Ain, UAE
2011	Round of 16			
2011	Round of 16	0–2	(South Korea) Suwon Bluewings	Suwon, Korea
2012	Group Round			
2012	Group Round	2–2	(South Korea) Seongnam Ilhwa Chunma	Nagoya, Japan
2012	Group Round	1–1	(Australia) Central Coast Marinersl	Gosford, Australia
2012	Group Round	3–0	(China) Tianjin Teda	Tianjin, China
2012	Group Round	0–0	(China) Tianjin Teda	Nagoya, Japan
2012	Group Round	1–1	(South Korea) Seongnam Ilhwa Chunma	Seongnam, Korea
2012	Group Round	3–0	(Australia) Central Coast Mariners	Nagoya, Japan
2012	Round of 16			
2012	Round of 16	0–1	(Australia) Adelaide United	Adelaide, Australia
2021	Group Round			
2021	Group Round	1–0	(Malaysia) Johor Darul Ta'zim	Bangkok, Thailand
2021	Group Round	3–0	(South Korea) Pohang Steelers	Bangkok, Thailand
2021	Group Round	4–0	(Thailand) Ratchaburi Mitr Phol	Bangkok, Thailand
2021	Group Round	3–0	(Thailand) Ratchaburi Mitr Phol	Bangkok, Thailand
2021	Group Round	2–1	(Malaysia) Johor Darul Ta'zim	Bangkok, Thailand
2021	Group Round	1–1	(South Korea) Pohang Steelers	Bangkok, Thailand
2021	Round of 16			
2021	Round of 16	4–2	(South Korea) Daegu FC	Toyota, Japan
2021	Quarterfinal			
2021	Quarterfinal	0–3	(South Korea) Pohang Steelers	Jeonju, Korea

=== Sanfrecce Hiroshima ===
(Japan) Sanfrecce Hiroshima Statistics
Round	GP	W	D	L	GF	GA	GD	Pts
Play-off Round	1	0	1	0	0	0	0	1
Group Stage	30	13	6	11	40	37	+3	45
Knockout Stage	4	2	0	2	6	6	0	6
Total	35	15	7	13	46	43	+3	52

Sanfrecce Hiroshima Results
Season	Round	Results	Opposing Team	Venue
2010	Group Stage			
2010	Group Stage	0–1	(China) Shandong Luneng	Hiroshima, Japan
2010	Group Stage	1–2	(South Korea) Pohang Steelers	Pohang, Korea
2010	Group Stage	2–3	(Australia) Adelaide United	Adelaide, Australia
2010	Group Stage	1–0	(Australia) Adelaide United	Hiroshima, Japan
2010	Group Stage	3–2	(China) Shandong Luneng	Jinan, China
2010	Group Stage	4–3	(South Korea) Pohang Steelers	Hiroshima, Japan
2013	Group Stage			
2013	Group Stage	0–2	(Uzbekistan) Bunyodkor	Hiroshima, Japan
2013	Group Stage	1–2	(China) Beijing Guoan	Beijing, China
2013	Group Stage	0–1	(South Korea) Pohang Steelers	Hiroshima, Japan
2013	Group Stage	1–1	(South Korea) Pohang Steelers	Pohang, Korea
2013	Group Stage	0–0	(Uzbekistan) Bunyodkor	Tashkent, Uzbekistan
2013	Group Stage	0–0	(China) Beijing Guoan	Hiroshima, Japan
2014	Group Stage			
2014	Group Stage	1–1	(China) Beijing Guoan	Hiroshima, Japan
2014	Group Stage	1–2	(Australia) Central Coast Mariners	Gosford, Australia
2014	Group Stage	2–1	(South Korea) FC Seoul	Hiroshima, Japan
2014	Group Stage	2–2	(South Korea) FC Seoul	Seoul, Korea
2014	Group Stage	2–2	(China) Beijing Guoan	Beijing, China
2014	Group Stage	1–0	(Australia) Central Coast Mariners	Hiroshima, Japan
2014	Round of 16			
2014	Round of 16	3–1	(Australia) Western Sydney Wanderers	Hiroshima, Japan
2014	Round of 16	0–2	(Australia) Western Sydney Wanderers	Sydney, Australia
2016	Group Stage			
2016	Group Stage	1–2	(China) Shandong Luneng Taishan	Hiroshima, Japan
2016	Group Stage	1–4	(South Korea) FC Seoul	Seoul, Korea
2016	Group Stage	3–0	(Thailand) Buriram United	Hiroshima, Japan
2016	Group Stage	2–0	(Thailand) Buriram United	Buriram, Thailand
2016	Group Stage	0–1	(China) Shandong Luneng Taishan	Jinan, China
2016	Group Stage	2–1	(South Korea) FC Seoul	Hiroshima, Japan
2019	Play-off Round			
2019	Play-off Round	0–0 (4–3 p)	(Thailand) Chiangrai United	Hiroshima, Japan
2019	Group Stage			
2019	Group Stage	0–2	(China) Guangzhou Evergrande Taobao	Guangzhou, China
2019	Group Stage	2–1	(Australia) Melbourne Victory	Hiroshima, Japan
2019	Group Stage	2–0	(South Korea) Daegu FC	Hiroshima, Japan
2019	Group Stage	1–0	(South Korea) Daegu FC	Daegu, Korea
2019	Group Stage	1–0	(China) Guangzhou Evergrande Taobao	Hiroshima, Japan
2019	Group Stage	3–1	(Australia) Melbourne Victory	Melbourne, Australia
2019	Round of 16			
2019	Round of 16	0–1	(Japan) Kashima Antlers	Kashima, Japan
2019	Round of 16	3–2	(Japan) Kashima Antlers	Hiroshima, Japan

=== Shimizu S-Pulse ===
(Japan) Shimizu S-Pulse Statistics
Round	GP	W	D	L	GF	GA	GD	Pts
Group Stage	3	1	1	1	8	2	+6	4
Knockout Stage	-	-	-	-	-	-	-	-
Total	3	1	1	1	8	2	+6	4

Shimizu S-Pulse Results
Season	Round	Results	Opposing Team	Venue
2003	Group Round			
2003	Group Round	0–0	(China) Dalian Shide	Dalian, China
2003	Group Round	1–2	(South Korea) Seongnam Ilhwa	Dalian, China
2003	Group Round	7–0	(Thailand) Osotsapa FC	Dalian, China

=== Tokyo Verdy ===
(Japan) Tokyo Verdy Statistics
Round	GP	W	D	L	GF	GA	GD	Pts
Group Stage	2	0	0	2	0	3	-3	0
Knockout Stage	-	-	-	-	-	-	-	-
Total	2	0	0	2	0	3	-3	0

Tokyo Verdy Results
Season	Round	Results	Opposing Team	Venue
2006	Group Round			
2006	Group Round	0–2	(South Korea) Ulsan Horang-i	Tokyo, Japan
2006	Group Round	0–1	(South Korea) Ulsan Horang-i	Ulsan, Korea

=== Urawa Red Diamonds ===
(Japan) Urawa Red Diamonds Statistics
Round	GP	W	D	L	GF	GA	GD	Pts
Play-off Round	-	-	-	-	-	-	-	-
Group Stage	36	15	10	11	58	40	+18	55
Knockout Stage	28	12	8	8	42	32	+10	44
Total	64	27	18	19	100	72	+28	99

Urawa Red Diamonds Results
Season	Round	Results	Opposing Team	Venue
2007	Group Stage			
2007	Group Stage	3–0	(Indonesia) Persik Kediri	Saitama, Japan
2007	Group Stage	2–2	(Australia) Sydney FC	Sydney, Australia
2007	Group Stage	1–0	(China) Shanghai Shenhua	Saitama, Japan
2007	Group Stage	0–0	(China) Shanghai Shenhua	Shanghai, China
2007	Group Stage	3–3	(Indonesia) Persik Kediri	Surakarta, Indonesia
2007	Group Stage	0–0	(Australia) Sydney FC	Saitama, Japan
2007	Quarterfinal			
2007	Quarterfinal	2–1	(South Korea) Jeonbuk Motors	Saitama, Japan
2007	Quarterfinal	2–0	(South Korea) Jeonbuk Motors	Jeonju, Korea
2007	Semifinal			
2007	Semifinal	2–2	(South Korea) Seongnam Ilhwa	Seongnam, Korea
2007	Semifinal	2–2 (5–3 p)	(South Korea) Seongnam Ilhwa	Saitama, Japan
2007	Final			
2007	Final	1–1	(Iran) Sepahan	Isfahan, Iran
2007	Final	2–0	(Iran) Sepahan	Saitama, Japan
2008	Quarterfinal			
2008	Quarterfinal	2–3	(Kuwait) Al Qadisiya	Kuwait City, Kuwait
2008	Quarterfinal	2–0	(Kuwait) Al Qadisiya	Saitama, Japan
2008	Semifinal			
2008	Semifinal	1–1	(Japan) Gamba Osaka	Suita, Japan
2008	Semifinal	1–3	(Japan) Gamba Osaka	Saitama, Japan
2013	Group Stage			
2013	Group Stage	0–3	(China) Guangzhou Evergrande	Guangzhou, China
2013	Group Stage	4–1	(Thailand) Muangthong United	Saitama, Japan
2013	Group Stage	1–3	(South Korea) Jeonbuk Hyundai Motors	Saitama, Japan
2013	Group Stage	2–2	(South Korea) Jeonbuk Hyundai Motors	Jeonju, Korea
2013	Group Stage	3–2	(China) Guangzhou Evergrande	Saitama, Japan
2013	Group Stage	1–0	(Thailand) Muangthong United	Nonthaburi, Thailand
2015	Group Stage			
2015	Group Stage	1–2	(South Korea) Suwon Samsung Bluewings	Suwon, Korea
2015	Group Stage	0–1	(Australia) Brisbane Roar	Saitama, Japan
2015	Group Stage	0–2	(China) Beijing Guoan	Beijing, China
2015	Group Stage	1–1	(China) Beijing Guoan	Saitama, Japan
2015	Group Stage	1–2	(South Korea) Suwon Samsung Bluewings	Saitama, Japan
2015	Group Stage	2–1	(Australia) Brisbane Roar	Gold Coast, Australia
2016	Group Stage			
2016	Group Stage	2–0	(Australia) Sydney FC	Saitama, Japan
2016	Group Stage	0–1	(South Korea) Pohang Steelers	Pohang, Korea
2016	Group Stage	2–2	(China) Guangzhou Evergrande Taobao	Guangzhou, China
2016	Group Stage	1–0	(China) Guangzhou Evergrande Taobao	Saitama, Japan
2016	Group Stage	0–0	(Australia) Sydney FC	Sydney, Australia
2016	Group Stage	1–1	(South Korea) Pohang Steelers	Saitama, Japan
2016	Round of 16			
2016	Round of 16	1–0	(South Korea) FC Seoul	Saitama, Japan
2016	Round of 16	2–3 (6–7 p)	(South Korea) FC Seoul	Seoul, Korea
2017	Group Stage			
2017	Group Stage	4–0	(Australia) Western Sydney Wanderers	Sydney, Australia
2017	Group Stage	5–2	(South Korea) FC Seoul	Saitama, Japan
2017	Group Stage	2–3	(China) Shanghai SIPG	Shanghai, China
2017	Group Stage	1–0	(China) Shanghai SIPG	Saitama, Japan
2017	Group Stage	6–1	(Australia) Western Sydney Wanderers	Saitama, Japan
2017	Group Stage	0–1	(South Korea) FC Seoul	Seoul, Korea
2017	Round of 16			
2017	Round of 16	0–2	(South Korea) Jeju United	Jeju City, Korea
2017	Round of 16	3–0	(South Korea) Jeju United	Saitama, Japan
2017	Quarterfinal			
2017	Quarterfinal	1–3	(Japan) Kawasaki Frontale	Kawasaki, Japan
2017	Quarterfinal	4–1	(Japan) Kawasaki Frontale	Saitama, Japan
2017	Semifinal			
2017	Semifinal	1–1	(China) Shanghai SIPG	Shanghai, China
2017	Semifinal	1–0	(China) Shanghai SIPG	Saitama, Japan
2017	Final			
2017	Final	1–1	(Saudi Arabia) Al-Hilal	Riyadh, Saudi Arabia
2017	Final	1–0	(Saudi Arabia) Al-Hilal	Saitama, Japan
2019	Group Stage			
2019	Group Stage	3–0	(Thailand) Buriram United	Saitama, Japan
2019	Group Stage	0–0	(China) Beijing Sinobo Guoan	Beijing, China
2019	Group Stage	0–1	(South Korea) Jeonbuk Hyundai Motors	Saitama, Japan
2019	Group Stage	1–2	(South Korea) Jeonbuk Hyundai Motors	Jeonju, Korea
2019	Group Stage	2–1	(Thailand) Buriram United	Buriram, Thailand
2019	Group Stage	3–0	(China) Beijing Sinobo Guoan	Saitama, Japan
2019	Round of 16			
2019	Round of 16	1–2	(South Korea) Ulsan Hyundai	Saitama, Japan
2019	Round of 16	3–0	(South Korea) Ulsan Hyundai	Ulsan, Korea
2019	Quarterfinal			
2019	Quarterfinal	2–2	(China) Shanghai SIPG	Shanghai, China
2019	Quarterfinal	1–1 (a)	(China) Shanghai SIPG	Saitama, Japan
2019	Semifinal			
2019	Semifinal	2–0	(China) Guangzhou Evergrande Taobao	Saitama, Japan
2019	Semifinal	1–0	(China) Guangzhou Evergrande Taobao	Guangzhou, China
2019	Final			
2019	Final	0–1	(Saudi Arabia) Al-Hilal	Riyadh, Saudi Arabia
2019	Final	0–2	(Saudi Arabia) Al-Hilal	Saitama, Japan
2022	Group Stage			
2022	Group Stage	4–1	(Singapore) Lion City Sailors	Buriram, Thailand
2022	Group Stage	5–0	(China) Shandong Taishan	Buriram, Thailand
2022	Group Stage	0–1	(South Korea) Daegu FC	Buriram, Thailand
2022	Group Stage	0–0	(South Korea) Daegu FC	Buriram, Thailand
2022	Group Stage	6–0	(Singapore) Lion City Sailors	Buriram, Thailand
2022	Group Stage	5–0	(China) Shandong Taishan	Buriram, Thailand
2022	Round of 16			
2022	Round of 16	5–0	(Malaysia) Johor Darul Ta'zim	Saitama, Japan
2022	Quarterfinal			
2022	Quarterfinal	4–0	(Thailand) BG Pathum United	Saitama, Japan
2022	Semifinal			
2022	Semifinal	1-1 (3–1 p)	(South Korea) Jeonbuk Hyundai Motors	Saitama, Japan

=== Vegalta Sendai ===
(Japan) Vegalta Sendai Statistics
Round	GP	W	D	L	GF	GA	GD	Pts
Group Stage	6	1	3	2	5	6	-1	6
Knockout Stage	-	-	-	-	-	-	-	-
Total	6	1	3	2	5	6	-1	6

Vegalta Sendai Results
Season	Round	Results	Opposing Team	Venue
2013	Group Round			
2013	Group Round	1–1	(Thailand) Buriram United	Sendai, Japan
2013	Group Round	0–0	(China) Jiangsu Sainty	Nanjing, China
2013	Group Round	1–2	(South Korea) FC Seoul	Seoul, Korea
2013	Group Round	1–0	(South Korea) FC Seoul	Sendai, Japan
2013	Group Round	1–1	(Thailand) Buriram United	Buriram, Thailand
2013	Group Round	1–2	(China) Jiangsu Sainty	Sendai, Japan

=== Vissel Kobe ===
(Japan) Vissel Kobe Statistics
Round	GP	W	D	L	GF	GA	GD	Pts
Group Stage	4	2	0	2	4	5	-1	6
Knockout Stage	3	1	1	1	4	3	+1	4
Total	7	3	1	3	8	8	0	10

Vissel Kobe Results
Season	Round	Results	Opposing Team	Venue
2020	Group Round			
2020	Group Round	1–0	(South Korea) Suwon Samsung Bluewings	Suwon, Korea
2020	Group Round	3–1	(China) Guangzhou Evergrande	Doha, Qatar
2020	Group Round	0–2	(China) Guangzhou Evergrande	Al Wakrah, Qatar
2020	Group Round	0–2	(South Korea) Suwon Samsung Bluewings	Doha, Qatar
2020	Round of 16			
2020	Round of 16	2–0	(China) Shanghai SIPG	Doha, Qatar
2020	Quarterfinal			
2020	Quarterfinal	1–1 (7–6 p)	(South Korea) Suwon Samsung Bluewings	Al Wakrah, Qatar
2020	Semifinal			
2020	Semifinal	1–2	(South Korea) Ulsan Hyundai	Doha, Qatar

=== Yokohama F. Marinos ===
(Japan) Yokohama F. Marinos Statistics
Round	GP	W	D	L	GF	GA	GD	Pts
Play-off Round	-	-	-	-	-	-	-	-
Group Stage	24	15	2	7	49	22	+27	47
Knockout Stage	1	0	0	1	2	3	-1	0
Total	25	15	2	8	51	25	+26	47

Yokohama F. Marinos Results
Season	Round	Results	Opposing Team	Venue
2004	Group Stage			
2004	Group Stage	3–0	(Vietnam) Binh Dinh F.C.	Qui Nhon, Vietnam
2004	Group Stage	4–0	(Indonesia) Persik Kediri	Yokohama, Japan
2004	Group Stage	1–2	(South Korea) Seongnam Ilhwa	Yokohama, Japan
2004	Group Stage	1–0	(South Korea) Seongnam Ilhwa	Seongnam, Korea
2004	Group Stage	6–0	(Vietnam) Binh Dinh F.C.	Yokohama, Japan
2004	Group Stage	4–1	(Indonesia) Persik Kediri	Kediri, Indonesia
2005	Group Stage			
2005	Group Stage	0–1	(China) Shandong Luneng	Yokohama, Japan
2005	Group Stage	2–0	(Indonesia) PSM Makassar	Makassar, Indonesia
2005	Group Stage	2–1	(Thailand) BEC Tero	Bangkok, Thailand
2005	Group Stage	2–0	(Thailand) BEC Tero	Yokohama, Japan
2005	Group Stage	1–2	(China) Shandong Luneng	Jinan, China
2005	Group Stage	3–0	(Indonesia) PSM Makassar	Yokohama, Japan
2014	Group Stage			
2014	Group Stage	0–3	(South Korea) Jeonbuk Hyundai Motors	Jeonju, Korea
2014	Group Stage	1–1	(China) Guangzhou Evergrande	Yokohama, Japan
2014	Group Stage	0–1	(Australia) Melbourne Victory	Melbourne, Australia
2014	Group Stage	3–2	(Australia) Melbourne Victory	Yokohama, Japan
2014	Group Stage	2–1	(South Korea) Jeonbuk Hyundai Motors	Yokohama, Japan
2014	Group Stage	1–2	(China) Guangzhou Evergrande	Guangzhou, China
2020	Group Stage			
2020	Group Stage	2–1	(South Korea) Jeonbuk Hyundai Motors	Jeonju, Korea
2020	Group Stage	4–0	(Australia) Sydney FC	Yokohama, Japan
2020	Group Stage	1–0	(China) Shanghai SIPG	Al Wakrah, Qatar
2020	Group Stage	1–2	(China) Shanghai SIPG	Al Wakrah, Qatar
2020	Group Stage	4–1	(South Korea) Jeonbuk Hyundai Motors	Al Wakrah, Qatar
2020	Group Stage	1–1	(Australia) Sydney FC	Al Wakrah, Qatar
2020	Round of 16			
2020	Round of 16	2–3	(South Korea) Suwon Samsung Bluewings	Doha, Qatar

== Statistics by opponents league ==
Updated to 2021 season after Final

=== A-League ===
Japan vs. Australian Clubs Statistics
Team	GP	W	D	L	GF	GA	GD	Pts
(Japan) Gamba Osaka	12	6	3	3	25	15	+10	21
(Japan) Kashima Antlers	12	6	2	4	20	12	+8	20
(Japan) Kawasaki Frontale	10	6	1	3	20	7	+13	19
(Japan) Urawa Red Diamonds	8	4	3	1	16	5	+11	15
(Japan) Sanfrecce Hiroshima	8	5	0	3	13	10	+3	15
(Japan) FC Tokyo	4	4	0	0	8	2	+6	12
(Japan) Nagoya Grampus	5	2	2	1	6	3	+3	8
(Japan) Yokohama F. Marinos	4	2	1	1	8	4	+4	7
(Japan) Kashiwa Reysol	2	2	0	0	6	1	+5	6
Total	65	37	12	16	122	59	+63	123

=== Chinese Super League ===
Japan vs. Chinese Clubs Statistics
Team	GP	W	D	L	GF	GA	GD	Pts
(Japan) Kashima Antlers	23	11	7	5	35	23	+12	40
(Japan) Urawa Red Diamonds	18	8	7	3	22	17	+5	31
(Japan) Kawasaki Frontale	14	5	4	5	19	13	+6	19
(Japan) Gamba Osaka	16	5	3	8	19	18	+1	18
(Japan) Cerezo Osaka	10	5	1	4	17	14	+3	16
(Japan) FC Tokyo	10	4	2	4	10	8	+2	14
(Japan) Kashiwa Reysol	12	2	5	5	15	25	-10	11
(Japan) Nagoya Grampus	6	2	3	1	5	3	+2	9
(Japan) Sanfrecce Hiroshima	10	2	3	5	9	13	-4	9
(Japan) Júbilo Iwata	4	2	0	2	7	5	+2	6
(Japan) Vissel Kobe	3	2	0	1	5	3	+2	6
(Japan) Yokohama F. Marinos	6	1	1	4	5	8	-3	4
(Japan) Shimizu S-Pulse	1	0	1	0	0	0	0	1
(Japan) Vegalta Sendai	2	0	1	1	1	2	−1	1
Total	135	49	38	48	169	152	+17	185

=== Hong Kong Premier League ===
Japan vs. Hong Kong Clubs Statistics
Team	GP	W	D	L	GF	GA	GD	Pts
(Japan) Kawasaki Frontale	2	1	1	0	5	1	+4	4
(Japan) Cerezo Osaka	2	1	1	0	2	1	+1	4
(Japan) Kashiwa Reysol	2	1	0	1	1	1	0	3
Total	6	3	2	1	8	3	+5	11

=== Liga Indonesia ===
Japan vs. Indonesian Clubs Statistics
Team	GP	W	D	L	GF	GA	GD	Pts
(Japan) Yokohama F. Marinos	4	4	0	0	13	1	+12	12
(Japan) Gamba Osaka	2	2	0	0	8	0	+8	6
(Japan) Kashima Antlers	2	2	0	0	8	1	+7	6
(Japan) Kawasaki Frontale	2	2	0	0	6	1	+5	6
(Japan) Cerezo Osaka	2	2	0	0	6	1	+5	6
(Japan) Urawa Red Diamonds	2	1	1	0	6	3	+3	4
Total	14	13	1	0	47	7	+40	40

=== Iran Pro League ===
Japan vs. Iranian Clubs Statistics
Team	GP	W	D	L	GF	GA	GD	Pts
(Japan) Urawa Red Diamonds	2	1	1	0	3	1	+2	4
(Japan) Kashima Antlers	2	1	1	0	2	0	+2	4
(Japan) Kawasaki Frontale	2	0	2	0	0	0	0	2
Total	6	2	4	0	5	1	+4	10

=== K League ===
Japan vs. South Korean Clubs Statistics
Team	GP	W	D	L	GF	GA	GD	Pts
(Japan) Gamba Osaka	25	8	6	11	35	44	-9	30
(Japan) Kawasaki Frontale	19	8	5	6	30	24	+6	29
(Japan) Kashima Antlers	20	8	4	8	31	29	+2	28
(Japan) Kashiwa Reysol	13	7	2	4	29	19	+10	23
(Japan) Nagoya Grampus	12	6	4	2	23	15	+8	22
(Japan) Urawa Red Diamonds	20	6	4	10	30	29	+1	22
(Japan) Sanfrecce Hiroshima	10	5	2	3	16	15	+1	17
(Japan) Cerezo Osaka	9	4	1	4	10	15	-5	13
(Japan) Yokohama F. Marinos	7	4	0	3	12	11	+1	12
(Japan) Vissel Kobe	4	1	1	2	3	5	-2	4
(Japan) Vegalta Sendai	2	1	0	1	2	2	0	3
(Japan) Júbilo Iwata	4	1	0	3	5	8	−3	3
(Japan) FC Tokyo	6	0	2	4	5	11	-6	2
(Japan) Shimizu S-Pulse	1	0	0	1	1	2	−1	0
(Japan) Tokyo Verdy	2	0	0	2	0	3	−3	0
Total	154	59	31	64	232	232	0	208

=== Kuwaiti Premier League ===
Japan vs. Kuwaiti Clubs Statistics
Team	GP	W	D	L	GF	GA	GD	Pts
(Japan) Urawa Red Diamonds	2	1	0	1	4	3	1	3
Total	2	1	0	1	4	3	1	3

=== Malaysia Super League ===
Japan vs. Malaysian Clubs Statistics
Team	GP	W	D	L	GF	GA	GD	Pts
(Japan) Nagoya Grampus	2	2	0	0	3	1	+2	6
(Japan) Kashima Antlers	2	1	0	1	2	2	0	3
Total	4	3	0	1	5	3	+2	9

=== Philippines Football League ===
Japan vs. Filipino Clubs Statistics
Team	GP	W	D	L	GF	GA	GD	Pts
(Japan) Kawasaki Frontale	2	2	0	0	10	0	+10	6
(Japan) FC Tokyo	1	1	0	0	2	0	+2	3
Total	3	3	0	0	12	0	+12	9

=== Saudi Professional League ===
Japan vs. Saudi Arabian Clubs Statistics
Team	GP	W	D	L	GF	GA	GD	Pts
(Japan) Urawa Red Diamonds	4	1	1	2	2	4	-2	4
(Japan) Kashiwa Reysol	2	0	2	0	3	3	0	2
(Japan) Nagoya Grampus	2	0	0	2	3	8	−5	0
Total	8	1	3	4	8	15	-7	6

=== S.League ===
Japan vs. Singaporean Clubs Statistics
Team	GP	W	D	L	GF	GA	GD	Pts
(Japan) Gamba Osaka	4	4	0	0	17	3	+14	12
(Japan) Kashima Antlers	2	2	0	0	9	1	+8	6
Total	6	6	0	0	26	4	+22	18

=== Syrian Premier League ===
Japan vs. Syrian Clubs Statistics
Team	GP	W	D	L	GF	GA	GD	Pts
(Japan) Gamba Osaka	2	2	0	0	4	1	3	6
Total	2	2	0	0	4	1	3	6

=== Thailand Premier League ===
Japan vs. Thai Clubs Statistics
Team	GP	W	D	L	GF	GA	GD	Pts
(Japan) Urawa Red Diamonds	4	4	0	0	10	2	+8	12
(Japan) Kashima Antlers	5	3	1	1	22	7	+15	10
(Japan) Kawasaki Frontale	4	3	1	0	10	4	+6	10
(Japan) Gamba Osaka	6	2	4	0	8	5	+3	10
(Japan) Cerezo Osaka	6	2	3	1	12	7	+5	9
(Japan) Sanfrecce Hiroshima	3	2	1	0	5	0	+5	7
(Japan) Nagoya Grampus	2	2	0	0	7	0	+7	6
(Japan) Júbilo Iwata	2	2	0	0	6	2	+4	6
(Japan) Yokohama F. Marinos	2	2	0	0	4	1	+3	6
(Japan) FC Tokyo	1	1	0	0	9	0	+9	3
(Japan) Shimizu S-Pulse	1	1	0	0	7	0	+7	3
(Japan) Kashiwa Reysol	2	1	0	1	3	3	0	3
(Japan) Vegalta Sendai	2	0	2	0	2	2	0	2
Total	40	25	12	3	105	33	+72	87

=== UAE Pro-League ===
Japan vs. UAE Clubs Statistics
Team	GP	W	D	L	GF	GA	GD	Pts
(Japan) Nagoya Grampus	2	1	0	1	5	3	+2	3
Total	2	1	0	1	5	3	+2	3

=== Uzbek League ===
Japan vs. Uzbek Clubs Statistics
Team	GP	W	D	L	GF	GA	GD	Pts
(Japan) Gamba Osaka	2	1	0	1	5	4	+1	3
(Japan) Sanfrecce Hiroshima	2	0	1	1	0	2	−2	1
Total	4	1	1	2	5	6	-1	4

=== V-League ===
Japan vs. Vietnamese Clubs Statistics
Team	GP	W	D	L	GF	GA	GD	Pts
(Japan) Gamba Osaka	2	2	0	0	20	1	+19	6
(Japan) Kashima Antlers	2	2	0	0	10	0	+10	6
(Japan) Yokohama F. Marinos	2	2	0	0	9	0	+9	6
(Japan) Júbilo Iwata	2	2	0	0	7	0	+7	6
(Japan) FC Tokyo	2	2	0	0	5	2	+3	6
(Japan) Kashiwa Reysol	2	1	0	1	5	2	+3	3
Total	12	11	0	1	56	5	+51	33
