= Ian Masson =

New Zealand footballer

Personal information
- Full name: Ian A Masson
- Place of birth: New Zealand

Senior career*
Years	Team	Apps	(Gls)
- Mount Wellington

International career
1980–1983	New Zealand	4	(0)
- * Club domestic league appearances and goals

Ian Masson is a former association football player who represented New Zealand at international level.

== Career ==
Masson made his full New Zealand debut in a 1-1 draw with Fiji on 20 October 1980 and ended his international playing career with four official A-international caps to his credit, his final cap an appearance in a 1-1 draw with Sudan on 9 June 1983.
