= Nigel Debenham =

New Zealand footballer

Personal information
- Full name: Nigel Debenham
- Place of birth: New Zealand
- Position: Defender

Senior career*
Years	Team	Apps	(Gls)
ante 1978–?	Dunedin City		
?–post 1989	Mount Wellington		

International career
1978–1989	New Zealand	4	(0)
- * Club domestic league appearances and goals

Nigel Debenham is a former association football player who represented New Zealand at international level.

Debenham made his full All Whites debut in a 2–0 win over Singapore on 1 October 1978. It was 10 years before he next played an official game for his national side when he came on as a substitute for two games against Taiwan in 1988, before a fourth and final appearance in a 1–4 loss to Australia on 12 March 1989.
