= 1986 NSL Cup =

National Soccer League Cup

Tournament details
- Country: Australia
- Dates: 16 March – 17 September 1986
- Teams: 32

Final positions
- Champions: Sydney City (1st title)
- Runners-up: Adelaide Hellas

Tournament statistics
- Matches played: 32
- Goals scored: 102 (3.19 per match)
- Attendance: 91,222 (2,851 per match)

The 1986 NSL Cup was the tenth edition of the NSL Cup, which was the main national association football knockout cup competition in Australia. The competition was known as the Nanda Soccer Cup for sponsorship reasons.

Sydney Olympic were the defending champions, having defeated Preston Makedonia to win their second title in the previous year's final, but they were eliminated in the quarter-finals by Canberra City.

Sydney City defeated Adelaide Hellas 3–2 in the final to win their first NSL Cup title. As winners, they qualified for the Oceania Cup Winners' Cup.

== Teams ==
The NSL Cup was a knockout competition with 32 teams taking part all trying to reach the Final in September 1986. The competition consisted of the 24 teams from the National Soccer League (12 from the Northern Conference and 12 from the Southern Conference) plus 8 teams from their respective top division state leagues.

Round	Main date	Number of fixtures	Clubs remaining
First round	Sunday 23 March 1986	17	32 → 16
Second round	Sunday 27 April 1986	8	8 → 4
Quarter-finals	Saturday 1 June 1986	4	8 → 4
Semi-finals	Wednesday 20 August 1986	2	4 → 2
Final	Wednesday 17 September 1986	1	2 → 1

== First round ==
16 March 1986	Adelaide Hellas (1)	3–0	Salisbury United (2)	Adelaide
	Konstandopoulos 77', 83'; Honeyman 66'	Report		Stadium: Hindmarsh Stadium; Attendance: 3,687; Referee: Jim Rossis

22 March 1986	Brunswick Juventus (1)	0–1	Melbourne Croatia (1)	Melbourne
		Report	Ward 89'	Stadium: Olympic Park; Attendance: 6,000; Referee: Bernie Upjohn

22 March 1986	Heidelberg United (1)	2–1	Preston Makedonia (1)	Melbourne
	Selemidis 55'; Deligiannis 62'	Report	Lane 30'	Stadium: Olympic Park; Attendance: 6,000; Referee: Stewart Mellings

22 March 1986	Newcastle Rosebud United (1)	2–1	Belmont Swansea (2)	Newcastle
	Maier 50' (pen.); Ingham 80'	Report	Winsor 86'	Stadium: Adamstown Oval; Referee: Terry Seacy
Note: Newcastle Rosebud United fielded 12 players for this match.

23 March 1986	Blacktown City (1)	6–0	West Woden Juventus (2)	Sydney
	Brennan 4', 57'; Thornthwaite 28', 66'; Carroll 30', 36'	Report		Stadium: Gabbie Stadium; Attendance: 656; Referee: Graham Warne

23 March 1986	Brisbane City (1)	2–1	Brisbane Lions (1)	Brisbane
	Blomfield 43'; Cooper 90' (pen.)	Report	Wright 11'	Stadium: Spencer Park; Attendance: 1,382; Referee: Bill Monteverde

23 March 1986	Canterbury Marrickville (1)	2–3	Wollongong City (1)	Sydney
	Haniotis 49' (pen.), 64'	Report	Rivero 24'; Giraldi 57'; Kotamanidis 77'	Stadium: Melita Stadium; Attendance: 520; Referee: Ken Small

23 March 1986	Footscray JUST (1)	1–1 (a.e.t.) (9–8 p)	Sunshine George Cross (1)	Melbourne
	Lazopoulos 40'	Report	Mitten 80'	Stadium: Middle Park Soccer Stadium; Attendance: 4,000; Referee: Bernie Upjohn

23 March 1986	South Melbourne (1)	5–1	Juventus Pioneer (2)	Melbourne
	Davidson 12'; Egan 27'; Brown 45' (pen.), 48', 51'	Report	Kannegeisser 58'	Stadium: Middle Park Soccer Stadium; Attendance: 4,000; Referee: Evan Venios

23 March 1986	St George-Budapest (1)	2–0	Marconi Fairfield (1)	Sydney
	Moffitt 71'; Belusic 77'	Report		Stadium: St George Stadium; Attendance: 4,850; Referee: Rob Davies

23 March 1986	Sydney Olympic (1)	6–0	APIA Leichhardt (1)	Sydney
	Johnston 13'; Soper 60', 68'; Dakos 63'; Kalantzis 64', 78'	Report		Stadium: St George Stadium; Attendance: 4,850; Referee: Gary Power

23 March 1986	Stirling Macedonia (2)	1–1 (a.e.t.) (4–5 p)	Adelaide City (1)	Perth
	Hunter 80'	Report	Mullen 10'	Stadium: Macedonia Park; Attendance: 2,500

23 March 1986	Sydney Croatia (1)	0–3	Sydney City (1)	Sydney
		Report	Farina 37'; Kosmina 41'; Gomez 44'	Stadium: King Tomislav Park; Attendance: 3,500; Referee: Jim Reeves

26 March 1986	Croydon City (2)	3–0	Green Gully (1)	Melbourne
	French 44'; Brogan 56'; McLean 59' (pen.)	Report		Stadium: Olympic Park; Referee: Chris Bambridge

26 March 1986	Inter Monaro (1)	3–3	Canberra City (1)	Queanbeyan
	Giampaolo 16'; Winn 23', 77'	Report	Phillips 5'; Gibson 65', 85'	Stadium: Seiffert Oval; Attendance: 1,350; Referee: Bob Marshall
Note: Match was abandoned after lighting failure on 90 minutes and replayed

9 April 1986 Replay	Canberra City (1)	2–1	Inter Monaro (1)	Canberra
	Gibson 54'; Palacios 65'	Report	Budini 58'	Stadium: Bruce Stadium; Attendance: 720; Referee: Bob Marshall

31 March 1986	Melita Eagles (2)	3–2	Ipswich United (2)	Sydney
	Farnsworth 4'; Laing 21'; Meerbani 24'	Report	Barnard 26', 90'	Stadium: Melita Stadium; Attendance: 500; Referee: Terry Seacy

== Second round ==
27 April 1986	Croydon City (2)	2–1	South Melbourne (1)	Melbourne
14:00 AEST	McLean 46' (pen.); French 65'	Report	Davidson 47'	Stadium: Olympic Park; Attendance: 6,000; Referee: Stewart Mellings

27 April 1986	St George-Budapest (1)	0–3	Blacktown City (1)	Sydney
14:00 AEST		Report	Slater 28'; Carroll 48', 65'	Stadium: St George Stadium; Attendance: 5,569; Referee: Rob Davies

27 April 1986	Adelaide Hellas (1)	1–0	Adelaide City (1)	Adelaide
14:30 ACST	Scott 11'	Report		Stadium: Hindmarsh Stadium; Attendance: 5,126; Referee: Don Campbell

27 April 1986	Brisbane City (1)	1–0	Melita Eagles (2)	Brisbane
15:00 AEST	White 83'	Report		Stadium: Spencer Park; Attendance: 869; Referee: Bill Monteverde

27 April 1986	Canberra City (1)	1–0	Melbourne Croatia (1)	Canberra
15:00 AEST	Harkins 47'	Report		Stadium: Bruce Stadium; Attendance: 1,445; Referee: Jim Reeves

27 April 1986	Sydney City (1)	2–0	Newcastle Rosebud United (1)	Sydney
15:00 AEST	Farina 12'; Lee 72'	Report		Stadium: Sydney Athletic Field; Attendance: 350; Referee: Gary Power

27 April 1986	Footscray JUST (1)	1–2	Heidelberg United (1)	Melbourne
16:00 AEST	Lujic 24'	Report	Delgiannis 15'; Hunter 30'	Stadium: Olympic Park; Attendance: 6,000; Referee: Chris Bambridge

27 April 1986	Sydney Olympic (1)	1–0	Wollongong Wolves (1)	Sydney
16:00 AEST	Stevenson 77'	Report		Stadium: St George Stadium; Attendance: 5,569; Referee: Richard Lorenc

== Quarter-finals ==
30 May 1986	Sydney Olympic (1)	0–1 (a.e.t.)	Canberra City (1)	Sydney
20:00 AEST		Report	Palacios 109'	Stadium: St George Stadium; Attendance: 3,170; Referee: Arthur Owens

1 June 1986	Adelaide Hellas (1)	2–1	Croydon City (2)	Adelaide
14:30 ACST	Honeyman 31'; Konstandopoulos 85'	Report	Humble 14'	Stadium: Hindmarsh Stadium; Attendance: 3,000; Referee: Stewart Mellings

1 June 1986	Heidelberg United (1)	3–3 (a.e.t.) (3–1 p)	Blacktown City (1)	Melbourne
15:00 AEST	Tsolakis 9', 80'; Selemidis 60'	Report	Thornthwaite 26', 28'; Slater 87'	Stadium: Olympic Park; Attendance: 1,200; Referee: Jim Rossis

4 June 1986	Brisbane City (1)	1–3	Sydney City (1)	Brisbane
20:00 AEST	Fabrizio 2'	Report	Barnes 41'; Saad 53'; de Marigny 68'	Stadium: Perry Park; Attendance: 700; Referee: Rob Davies

== Semi-finals ==
20 August 1986	Adelaide Hellas (1)	3–1 (a.e.t.)	Canberra City (1)	Adelaide
	Scott 29'; Dunn 99'; Papadopoulos 113'	Report	Gibson 58'	Stadium: Hindmarsh Stadium; Attendance: 2,500; Referee: Jim Rossis

20 August 1986	Heidelberg United (1)	1–1 (a.e.t.) (3–4 p)	Sydney City (1)	Melbourne
	Wilson 51'	Report	Farina 89'	Stadium: Olympic Park; Attendance: 2,000; Referee: Chris Bambridge

== Final ==
17 September 1986
20:00 ACST

Adelaide Hellas	2–3 (a.e.t.)	Sydney City
Hristodoulou 49', 112'	Report	Kosmina 61'; Farina 114', 118'

Hindmarsh Stadium, Adelaide
Attendance: 3,200
Referee: Stewart Mellings
