= Myanmar football clubs in Asian competitions =

Football clubs in the Myanmar National League compete in the AFC Champions League annually.This details the participation and performances in the competition since its based at 2002 as a result of the merger between the Asian Club Championship, the Asian Cup Winners' Cup and the Asian Super Cup.

== Participations ==
WD : Withdrew, QS : Qualifying Stage, G : Group Round, R16 : Round of 16, Q : Quarterfinals, S : Semifinal, R : Runner-up, W : Winner

Team	Qualified	2015	2016	2017	2018	2019	2020	2021	2022
Shan United	2 Time				QS		QS; R3	WD	WD
Yadanarbon	2 Times	QS		QS
Yangon United	2 Time		QS			QS; R2

== Statistics by club ==
Match won	Match drawn	Match lost

=== Shan United ===
Team	GP	W	D	L	F	A	GD	PTS
Shan United	2	0	1	1	3	4	−1	1

==== Results ====
Season	Round	Team 1	Score	Team 2	Venue
2019	Qualifying R3	Ceres-Negroes	3–2	Shan United	Philippines
2018	Qualifying R3	(Myanmar) Shan United	1–1 (a.e.t.) (3–4p)	(Philippines) Ceres–Negros	Thuwunna Stadium, Yangon, Myanmar

=== Yadanarbon ===
Team	GP	W	D	L	F	A	GD	PTS
Yadanarbon	2	0	1	1	1	6	−5	1

==== Results ====
Season	Round	Team 1	Score	Team 2	Venue
2015	Qualifying R3	(Myanmar) Yadanarbon	1–1 (a.e.t.) (5–6p)	(Singapore) Warriors FC	Mandalarthiri Stadium, Mandalay, Myanmar
2017	Qualifying R2	(Myanmar) Yadanarbon	0–5	(Thailand) Sukhothai	Thung Thalay Luang Stadium, Sukhothai, Thailand

=== Yangon United ===
Team	GP	W	D	L	F	A	GD	PTS
Yangon United	3	1	0	2	5	7	−2	3

==== Results ====
Season	Round	Team 1	Score	Team 2	Venue
2019	Qualifying R2	Chainring United	3–1	Yangon United	Thailand
2019	Qualifying R3	Ceres-Negroes	1–2	Yangon United	Philippines
2016	Qualifying R2	(Myanmar) Yangon United	2–3 (a.e.t.)	(Thailand) Chonburi	Chonburi Stadium, Chonburi, Thailand

== Overall statistics ==
=== By clubs ===
No	Team	GP	W	D	L	F	A	GD	PTS
1	Shan United	2	0	1	1	3	4	−1	1
2	Yadanarbon	2	0	1	1	1	6	−5	1
3	Yangon United	3	1	0	2	5	7	−2	3
