= Augusto Palacios =

Peruvian footballer (born 1951)

Personal information
- Full name: Ángel Augusto Palacios Valdivieso
- Date of birth: 23 December 1951 (age 74)
- Place of birth: Lima, Peru
- Position: Forward

Senior career*
Years	Team	Apps	(Gls)
1970–1971	Deportivo Olímpico	15	(0)
1971–1974	Sporting Cristal	28	(3)
1975–1976	Alianza Lima	16	(2)
1977–1978	Juan Aurich	12	(3)
1978	Deportivo Municipal	19	(7)
1979–1980	Cartaginés	20	(6)
1980–1982	Caroline Hill	36	(12)
1982	KTP	29	(9)
1983	Deportivo Táchira	10	(3)
1983	Sport Boys	7	(2)
1983–1984	Kickers Offenbach	3	(0)
1984	Sport Boys	20	(9)
1984–1989	Witbank Aces	65	(20)
1986	→ Canberra City (loan)	16	(4)
1990	AmaZulu	22	(1)
1991	Manning Rangers	30	(8)
Total		337	(87)

International career
1972–1981	Peru	6	(0)

Managerial career
- 1981: Hong Kong (women)
- 1987: Sport Boys
- 1990: Kaizer Chiefs
- 1992–1994: South Africa
- 1994: Gençlerbirliği
- 1995: Kaizer Chiefs
- 1995: Moroka Swallows
- 1996: Juan Aurich
- 1996–2012: Orlando Pirates (Director of Football)
- 2012: Orlando Pirates
- 2016–2017: Orlando Pirates
- * Club domestic league appearances and goals

Augusto Palacios (born 23 December 1951) is a Peruvian football coach and a former football player. He's been recently coaching South African club Orlando Pirates in the Premier Soccer League.

During his years as a professional footballer he played for a number of clubs in Peru, Costa Rica, Hong Kong, Venezuela, Finland, West-Germany, South Africa and Australia. He also played six internationals for the Peru national team.

Augusto Palacios has previously managed clubs in South Africa, Peru and Turkey as well as the Hong Kong women's national team and the South Africa national team.
