= Dave Witteveen =

New Zealand footballer

Personal information
- Full name: David Witteveen
- Place of birth: Auckland, New Zealand
- Position: Midfielder

Team information
- Current team: Ellerslie AFC

Senior career*
Years	Team	Apps	(Gls)
- Mount Wellington

International career
1986–1989	New Zealand	5	(0)
- * Club domestic league appearances and goals

David Witteveen is a former football (soccer) player who represented New Zealand at international level.

Witteveen made his full New Zealand debut in a 4–2 win over Fiji on 17 September 1986 and ended his international playing career with five A-international caps to his credit, his final cap an appearance in a 1–4 loss to Australia on 12 March 1989.
