= Chungcheng Stadium =

Stadium in Lingya, Kaohsiung, Taiwan

- 中正運動場
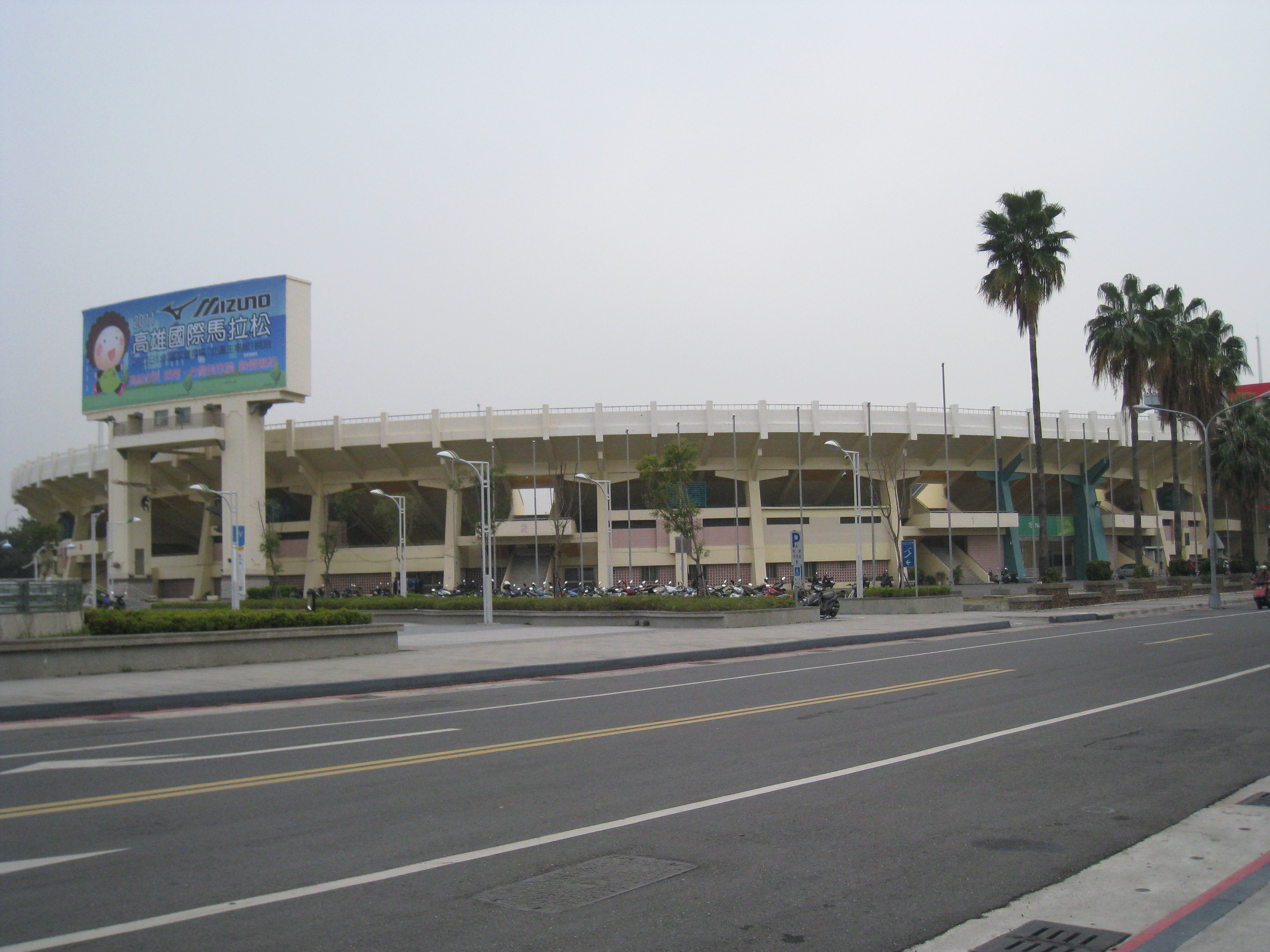

- Taiwan
- Location: Lingya, Kaohsiung, Taiwan
- Coordinates: 22°37′31.47″N 120°20′5.41″E
- Type: stadium
- Public transit: Martial Arts Stadium Station

Construction
- Opened: 1986

The Chungcheng Stadium (Chinese: 中正運動場; pinyin: Zhōngzhèng Yùndòngchǎng), opened in 1986, is a multi-use stadium in Lingya District, Kaohsiung, Taiwan. It is employed to hold several (athletics) events.

On 20 October 1996, Michael Jackson made a stop at the stadium for his HIStory World Tour playing to a sell out crowd of 35,000 fans.

== Transportation ==
The stadium is accessible within walking distance South from Lingya Sports Park Station of the Kaohsiung MRT.

== See also ==
- Sports in Taiwan
- List of stadiums in Taiwan
