= Oceania Cup Winners' Cup =

Oceania Cup Winners Cup, known for sponsorship purposes as the Qantas South Pacific Cup Winners Cup, was one of the two main Oceania tournaments for clubs, the other one is Oceania Champions League. It was only played in 1987 and Sydney City (Australia, qualified as NSL Cup winners in 1986) emerged as winners in a single match against North Shore United (New Zealand, qualified as Chatham Cup winners in 1986).

== Match ==
8 March 1987
15:30 UTC+12

North Shore United (New Zealand)	0–2	(Australia) Sydney City
	Report	Saad 29'; McCulloch 39'

Fuji Film Stadium, Auckland
Attendance: 1,000

North Shore United:
Gilgrist
Loader
Robert Ironside
Simpson
Darlington (Harding)
Duncan Cole
Boath
Keith Hobbs
Mackay
Harrison (Worsley)
Hagan
Manager:

Sydney City:
Gosling
Rodrigues
Robertson
O'Connor
Hooker
Lee
Souness (Parrish)
Tom McCulloch
de Marigny
Barnes
Abbas Saad
Manager:
Eddie Thomson
